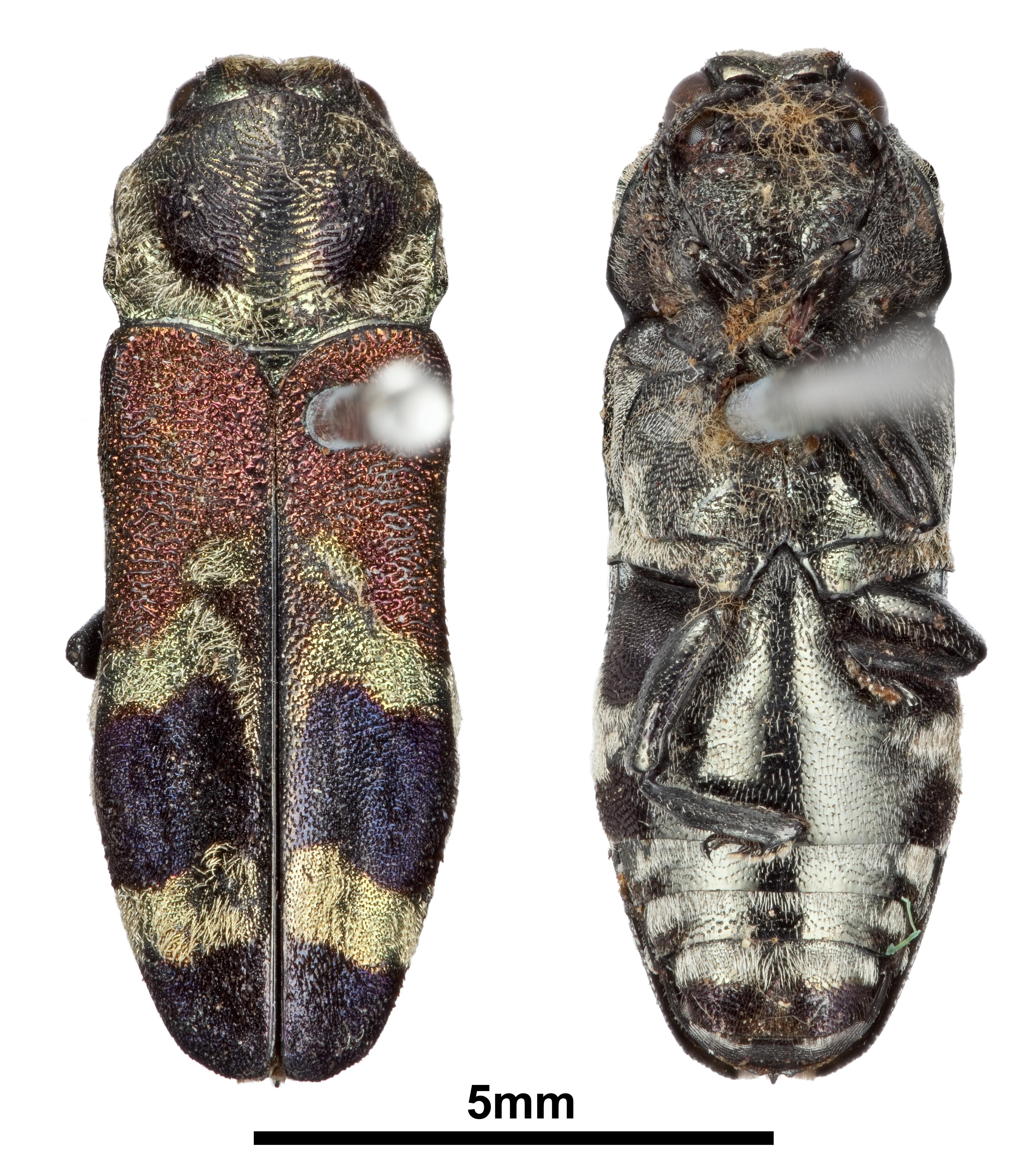
- Type specimen of Polyonychus tricolor
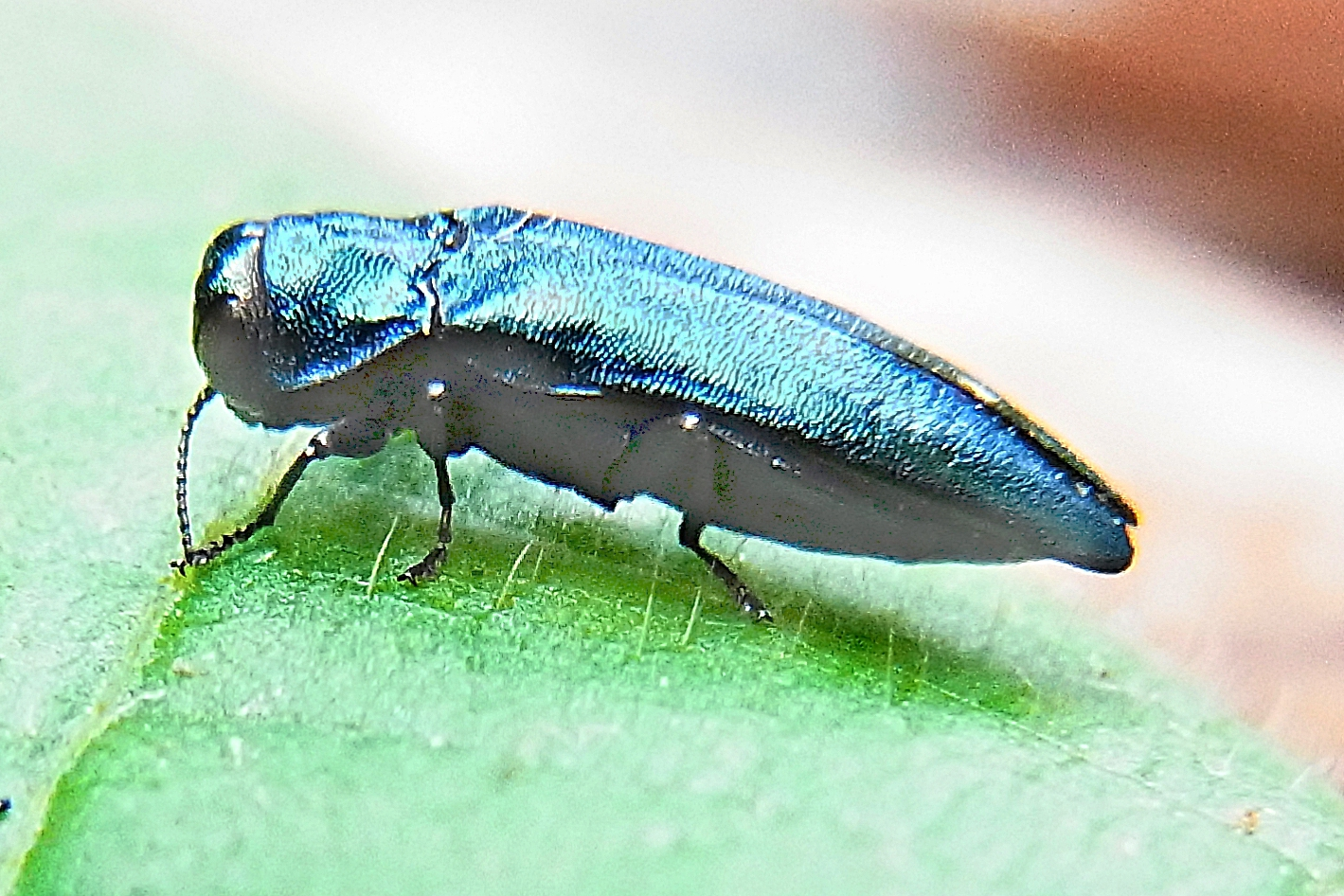
- Agrilus cyanescens located in Northern Spain.

Scientific classification
- Kingdom: Animalia
- Phylum: Arthropoda
- Clade: Pancrustacea
- Class: Insecta
- Order: Coleoptera
- Suborder: Polyphaga
- Infraorder: Elateriformia
- Family: Buprestidae
- Subfamily: Agrilinae; Lacordaire, 1857

Tribes
- Agrilini Laporte, 1835; Aphanisticini Jacquelin du Val, 1863; Coraebini Bedel, 1921; Tracheini Laporte, 1835

= Agrilinae =

Subfamily of beetles

Agrilinae is a subfamily of Elateriform beetles that belongs to the family Buprestidae (jewel beetles).

== Taxonomy ==
=== Taxonomic history ===
The subfamily was established by Jean Théodore Lacordaire, a Belgian entomologist, in 1857. When Agrilinae was established, the definition of it was too general and thus incompatible with the modern definitions meaning the definition of this subfamily has been reduced since its establishment. A study by Evans et al. (2015) performed a large-scale phylogenetic analysis of the family Buprestidae combining nuclear and mitochondrial data from over 100 species. The study strongly supported the monophyletic nature of several subfamilies within the family including Agrilinae. Bellamy, C. L. (1992) has reduced Cylindromorphini to a tribe under Agrilinae while the subfamily Trachyinae was deemed not necessary moving the six inclusive tribes to Agrilinae.

Sequencing of the mitochondrial genomes of members of Agrilinae show that it is closely related to Polycestinae, Chrysochroinae and Buprestinae.

=== Genera ===
Agrilinae contains many genera that are split into several tribes. Below is a list of genera belonging to this subfamily:

- Aaaaba Bellamy, 2013
- Afrocylindromorphus Bily & Bellamy, 1998
- Agrilochyseus Thery, 1935
- Agrilodia Obenberger, 1923
- Agriloides Kerremans, 1903
- Agrilus Curtis, 1825
- Alissoderus Deyrolle, 1864
- Amorphosoma Laporte, 1835
- Amorphosternoides Cobos, 1974
- Amorphosternus Deyrolle, 1864
- Amyia Saunders, 1871
- Anadora Kerremans, 1898
- Anaphlocteis Bellamy, 1986
- Angatra Descarpentries, 1969
- Anocisseis Bellamy, 1990
- Anodontodora Obenberger, 1931
- Antanambia Descarpentries, 1975
- Anthaxomorphus Deyrolle, 1864
- Aphanisticus Latreille, 1829
- Asymades Kerremans, 1893
- Australodraco Curletti, 2006
- Autarcontes Waterhouse, 1887
- Belgaumia Kerremans, 1903
- Bellamyus Curletti, 1997
- Bergidora Kerremans, 1903
- Borneoscelus Bellamy, 1995
- Brachycoraebus Kerremans, 1903
- Brachydora Obenberger, 1923
- Brachys Dejean, 1833
- Bourgoinia Obenberger, 1926
- Callimicra Deyrolle, 1864
- Callipyndax Waterhouse, 1887
- Camerunadora Bellamy, 2008
- Cantoniellus Kalashian, 2004
- Cantonius Thery, 1929
- Capitijubatus Bellamy, 1986
- Chalcophlocteis Obenberger, 1924
- Chloricala Kerremans, 1893
- Cisseicoraebus Kerremans, 1903
- Clema Semenov-Tian-Shianskij, 1900
- Cobosietta Bellamy, 1986
- Compsoglypha Fairmaire, 1904
- Coraebastus Fairmaire, 1896
- Coraebosoma Obenberger, 1923
- Coraebus Gory & Laporte, 1839
- Coroebina Obenberger, 1923
- Cryptodactylus Deyrolle, 1864
- Cryptomorpha Bellamy, 1988
- Cupriscobina Bellamy & Holm, 1985
- Cylindromorphoides Kerremans, 1903
- Cylindromorphus Kiesenwetter, 1857
- Cyphothroax Waterhouse, 1887
- Dejongiella Bellamy, 2006 - the correct date is 2003
- Demostis Kerremans, 1900
- Dessumia Descarpentries & Villiers, 1966
- Deyrollius Obenbgerger, 1922
- Diadora Kerremans, 1903
- Diadorina Cobos, 1974
- Dinocephalia Obenberger, 1923
- Dinocoroebus Obenberger, 1924
- Diphucrania Dejean, 1833
- Discoderella Bellamy, 1988
- Discoderes Chevrolat, 1838
- Discoderoides Thery, 1936
- Discoderopsis Thery, 1930
- Dismorpha Gistel, 1848
- Dorochoviella Jendek, 2006
- Duncanius Bellamy, 2008
- Endelomorphus Bily, 2007
- Endelus Deyrolle, 1864
- Entomogaster Saunders, 1871
- Epimacha Kerremans, 1900
- Ethiopoeus Bellamy, 2008
- Ethonion Kuban, 2001 - the correct date is 2000
- Euamyia Kerremans, 1903
- Euchroaria Obenberger, 1924
- Eudiadora Obenberger, 1924
- Eulasiodora Obenberger, 1924
- Eumerophilus Deyrolle, 1864
- Eumorphocerus Thery, 1930
- Eupristocerus Deyrolle, 1864
- Eurynodes Thery, 1934
- Evimantius Deyrolle, 1864
- Falliellus Bellamy, 2001
- Franchetia Thery, 1946
- Geralius Harold, 1869
- Germarica Blackburn, 1887
- Gigantocoraebus Obenberger, 1942
- Gracilocala Bellamy, 2006
- Habroloma Thomson, 1864
- Helferia Obenberger, 1932
- Helferina Cobos, 1956
- Heromorphus Obenberger, 1916
- Holmerika Bellamy, 1988
- Holubia Obenberger, 1924
- Hylaeogena Obenberger, 1923
- Hypocisseis Thompson, 1879
- Indiadactylus Bellamy, 1992
- Ivalouwayneia Bellamy, 2006
- Jaroslavia Obenberger, 1942
- Kamosia Kerremans, 1898
- Kamosiella Bellamy, 1988
- Katangiella Bellamy, 1988
- Katonia Thery, 1941
- Kerremansella Obenberger, 1923
- Kerremansia Peringuey, 1908
- Leiopleura Deyrolle, 1864
- Lepidoclema Bellamy & Holm, 1985
- Lepismadora Velten, 1987
- Lius Deyrolle, 1864
- Lumawigia Bellamy, 2005
- Madaphlocteis Bellamy, 2006
- Madecorformica Bellamy, 2008
- Malagascoderes Bellamy, 2006
- Malawiella Bellamy, 1990
- Mandritsaria Obenberger, 1942
- Maroantsetra Thery, 1937
- Maublancia Bellamy, 1998
- Melanocoraebus Baudon, 1968
- Meliacanthus Thery, 1942
- Melibaeopsis Kerremans, 1903
- Meliboeithon Obenberger, 1920
- Meliboeus Deyrolle, 1864
- Metasambus Kerremans, 1903
- Midongya Obenberger, 1942
- Mundaria Kerremans, 1894
- Mychommatus Murray, 1868
- Nalanda Thery, 1904
- Nastella Kerremans, 1903
- Neefia Bellamy, 2006 - the correct date is 2003
- Neefioides Bellamy, 2006 - the correct date is 2003
- Nelsonagrilus Jendek, 2006
- Neocoraebus Kerremans, 1903
- Neospades Blackburn, 1887
- Neotoxoscelus Fisher, 1921
- Neotrachys Obenberger, 1923
- Niehuisia Curletti, 1995
- Nickerleola Obenberger, 1923
- Obenbergerula Strand, 1932
- Omochyseus Waterhouse, 1887
- Pachycisseis Thery, 1929
- Pachyschelus Solier, 1833
- Paracephala Saunders, 1868
- Paracylindromorphus Thery, 1928
- Parademostis Obenberger, 1931
- Paradora Kerremans, 1900
- Paradorella Obenberger, 1923
- Paragrilus Saunders, 1871
- Parakamosia Obenberger, 1924
- Paranastella Obenberger, 1931
- Parasambus Descarpentries & Villiers, 1966
- Parastrigulia Bellamy, 1988
- Paraxenita Bellamy, 1988
- Pareumerus Deyrolle, 1864
- Peyrierasina Descarpentries, 1975
- Philippscelus Bellamy, 1998
- Philocoroebus Bellamy, 1991
- Phlocteis Kerremans, 1893
- Pilotrulleum Bellamy & Westcott, 1995
- Planidia Kerremans, 1899
- Polyonychus Chevrolat, 1838
- Promeliboeus Obenberger, 1924
- Pseudagrilodes Obenberger, 1923 - the correct date is 1921
- Pseudagrilus Laporte, 1835
- Pseudoclema Thery, 1938
- Pseudocoraebus Thery, 1905
- Pseudokamosia Thery, 1932
- Pseudokerremansia Bellamy & Holm, 1985
- Pseudophlocteis Bellamy, 1986
- Rhaeboscelis Chevrolat, 1838
- Sakalianus Jendek, 2007
- Sambirania Obenberger, 1942
- Sambomorpha Obenberger, 1924
- Sambus Deyrolle, 1864
- Seranambia Descarpentries, 1974
- Seyrigia Thery, 1937
- Shimogia Obenberger, 1942
- Sibuyanella Obenberger, 1942
- Sjoestedtius Thery, 1931
- Stanwatkinsius Barker & Bellamy, 2001
- Strandietta Bellamy, 1986
- Strigulia Kerremans, 1893
- Strigulioides Bellamy, 1986
- Suarezina Théry, 1936
- Svataea Alonso-Zarazaga & Roca-Cusachs, 2017
- Synechocera Deyrolle, 1864
- Taphroceroides Hespenheide, 2008
- Taphrocerus Solier, 1833
- Therybuprestis Strand, 1930
- Tonkinula Obenberger, 1923
- Toxoscelus Deyrolle, 1864
- Trachys Fabricius, 1801
- Trypantius Waterhouse, 1887
- Vanroonia Obenberger, 1923
- Velutia Kerremans, 1900
- Wendleria Obenberger, 1924
- Xenita Thery, 1941
- Xenomerius Obenberger, 1924
- Zitella Bellamy, 1992
