= Seyrigia =

Seyrigia may refer to:

- Seyrigia (beetle), a genus of insects in the family Buprestidae
- Seyrigia (plant), a genus of plants in the family Cucurbitaceae
