= Hylaeogena =

Scientific classification
- Kingdom: Animalia
- Phylum: Arthropoda
- Class: Insecta
- Order: Coleoptera
- Suborder: Polyphaga
- Infraorder: Elateriformia
- Family: Buprestidae
- Subfamily: Agrilinae
- Tribe: Tracheini
- Genus: Hylaeogena; Obenberger, 1923

Genus of beetles

Hylaeogena is a genus of beetles in the family Buprestidae, found in Central America, South America, and Australia.

== Species ==
The following species are members of the genus Hylaeogena.

- Hylaeogena achardi Obenberger, 1925
- Hylaeogena aeneonitens Hornburg, 2012
- Hylaeogena affinis Obenberger, 1923
- Hylaeogena alia Bellamy, 1998
- Hylaeogena alibertiae Fisher, 1930
- Hylaeogena alvarengai Cobos, 1967
- Hylaeogena anniae Obenberger, 1932
- Hylaeogena astraea (Waterhouse, 1889)
- Hylaeogena atroviridis (Fisher, 1922)
- Hylaeogena aurata Obenberger, 1925
- Hylaeogena aurocephala Cobos, 1967
- Hylaeogena aurulenta Cobos, 1959
- Hylaeogena benardi Obenberger, 1932
- Hylaeogena berlandi Obenberger, 1932
- Hylaeogena bicolor Apt, 1954
- Hylaeogena bordoni Cobos, 1967
- Hylaeogena bruchi (Kerremans, 1903)
- Hylaeogena bryanti Théry, 1940
- Hylaeogena carbo (Kirsch, 1866)
- Hylaeogena centralis (Waterhouse, 1889)
- Hylaeogena chopardi Obenberger, 1932
- Hylaeogena chrysocephala (Kerremans, 1896)
- Hylaeogena cincta (Waterhouse, 1889)
- Hylaeogena circularis (Kerremans, 1899)
- Hylaeogena circumciliata Cobos, 1967
- Hylaeogena circumcripta (Kerremans, 1903)
- Hylaeogena coelicolor Obenberger, 1925
- Hylaeogena cognata (Kirsch, 1873)
- Hylaeogena compacta (Waterhouse, 1889)
- Hylaeogena compar (Kirsch, 1873)
- Hylaeogena confusa Cobos, 1958
- Hylaeogena congnathoides Cobos, 1969
- Hylaeogena constans (Waterhouse, 1889)
- Hylaeogena cordieri Obenberger, 1923
- Hylaeogena curtula (Boheman, 1858)
- Hylaeogena cyaneoaurata Cobos, 1956
- Hylaeogena diabolica Cobos, 1959
- Hylaeogena dilatata (Gory, 1841)
- Hylaeogena discoidalis (Waterhouse, 1889)
- Hylaeogena dormitzeri Obenberger, 1925
- Hylaeogena elliptica Obenberger, 1925
- Hylaeogena ephippia (Fabricius, 1801)
- Hylaeogena episcopalis Obenberger, 1925
- Hylaeogena festiva (Fisher, 1922)
- Hylaeogena gratiosula Obenberger, 1925
- Hylaeogena grossei Obenberger, 1938
- Hylaeogena grouvellei Théry, 1934
- Hylaeogena gyoerfii Apt, 1954
- Hylaeogena helferi Obenberger, 1925
- Hylaeogena hydroporoides (Waterhouse, 1889)
- Hylaeogena insidiosa Cobos, 1978
- Hylaeogena iridea Apt, 1954
- Hylaeogena jeanneli Obenberger, 1932
- Hylaeogena joukli Obenberger, 1925
- Hylaeogena jousselinii (Gory, 1841)
- Hylaeogena jureceki Obenberger, 1941
- Hylaeogena kirschi Obenberger, 1925
- Hylaeogena klapaleki Obenberger, 1925
- Hylaeogena laenis (Gory, 1841)
- Hylaeogena lata (Kirsch, 1873)
- Hylaeogena laticeps (Waterhouse, 1889)
- Hylaeogena lecerfi Obenberger, 1932
- Hylaeogena lesnei Obenberger, 1932
- Hylaeogena lunifer (Waterhouse, 1889)
- Hylaeogena mariae Cobos, 1990
- Hylaeogena mequignoni Obenberger, 1932
- Hylaeogena metallica (Gory, 1841)
- Hylaeogena metzi Obenberger, 1925
- Hylaeogena micromegas Obenberger, 1925
- Hylaeogena modesta (Waterhouse, 1889)
- Hylaeogena nana (Kirsch, 1873)
- Hylaeogena nickerli Obenberger, 1925
- Hylaeogena nigerrima (Kerremans, 1903)
- Hylaeogena nigromicans Cobos, 1967
- Hylaeogena ogloblini Obenberger, 1932
- Hylaeogena onorei Cobos, 1990
- Hylaeogena opaca Cobos, 1978
- Hylaeogena ovalis (Waterhouse, 1889)
- Hylaeogena ovoidea Obenberger, 1925
- Hylaeogena ovulum Obenberger, 1925
- Hylaeogena paraguayensis Obenberger, 1923
- Hylaeogena pauligena Obenberger, 1925
- Hylaeogena pauperula (Thomson, 1879)
- Hylaeogena pilosa (Fisher, 1922)
- Hylaeogena planifrons (Kirsch, 1873)
- Hylaeogena rotundipennis (Fisher, 1922)
- Hylaeogena rugifrons Cobos, 1967
- Hylaeogena scutellaris Obenberger, 1925
- Hylaeogena seguyi Obenberger, 1932
- Hylaeogena semenovi Obenberger, 1932
- Hylaeogena semilunaris (Kerremans, 1900)
- Hylaeogena sepulchralis Obenberger, 1925
- Hylaeogena silverioi Cobos, 1956
- Hylaeogena sororcula Obenberger, 1932
- Hylaeogena speculum (Klug, 1825)
- Hylaeogena splendida Apt, 1954
- Hylaeogena submetallica Cobos, 1967
- Hylaeogena szekessyi Apt, 1954
- Hylaeogena tesari Obenberger, 1938
- Hylaeogena testudinaria (Gory, 1841)
- Hylaeogena tristis Cobos, 1956
- Hylaeogena unicolor (Kerremans, 1896)
- Hylaeogena venezuela Bellamy, 1996
- Hylaeogena viridifrons Cobos, 1967
- Hylaeogena zoufali Obenberger, 1925
