= Gracilocala =

Scientific classification
- Kingdom: Animalia
- Phylum: Arthropoda
- Class: Insecta
- Order: Coleoptera
- Suborder: Polyphaga
- Infraorder: Elateriformia
- Family: Buprestidae
- Subfamily: Agrilinae
- Genus: Gracilocala; Bellamy, 2006
- Species: G. bicolor

Binomial name
- Gracilocala bicolor Bellamy, 2006

Genus of beetles

Gracilocala bicolor is a species of beetle in the family Buprestidae, the only species in the genus Gracilocala.
