= Neotrachys =

Scientific classification
- Kingdom: Animalia
- Phylum: Arthropoda
- Class: Insecta
- Order: Coleoptera
- Suborder: Polyphaga
- Infraorder: Elateriformia
- Family: Buprestidae
- Subfamily: Agrilinae
- Tribe: Tracheini
- Subtribe: Tracheina
- Genus: Neotrachys; Obenberger, 1923

Genus of beetles

Neotrachys is a genus of Jewel Beetles in the beetle family Buprestidae. There are more than 30 described species in Neotrachys, found in the Neotropics. Many species are known to use ferns as their host plants.

== Species ==
These 32 species belong to the genus Neotrachys:

- Neotrachys amazonicus (Kerremans, 1896)
- Neotrachys andrewsi Hespenheide, 2006
- Neotrachys araguensis Cobos, 1978
- Neotrachys bellamyi Hespenheide, 2006
- Neotrachys bicolor Hespenheide, 1982
- Neotrachys bilyi Hespenheide, 1990
- Neotrachys bolivianus (Kerremans, 1897)
- Neotrachys bordoni Cobos, 1978
- Neotrachys caeruleus Hespenheide, 1982
- Neotrachys caracaensis Cobos, 1978
- Neotrachys chiriquiensis Hespenheide, 2006
- Neotrachys concinnus (Fisher, 1922)
- Neotrachys cupeyali (Zayas, 1988)
- Neotrachys cuprascens Hespenheide, 2006
- Neotrachys cyanea (Zayas, 1988)
- Neotrachys dominicanus Théry, 1947
- Neotrachys estebanus (Kerremans, 1896)
- Neotrachys falconensis Cobos, 1978
- Neotrachys fennahi Théry, 1940
- Neotrachys gleicheniae Hespenheide, 1982
- Neotrachys guadeloupensis (Fleutiaux & Salle, 1890)
- Neotrachys hoffmani Fisher, 1930
- Neotrachys jakovlevi Obenberger, 1932
- Neotrachys mariae Hespenheide, 2006
- Neotrachys nelsoni Hespenheide, 2006
- Neotrachys panamaensis (Fisher, 1924)
- Neotrachys refulgens Hespenheide, 2006
- Neotrachys resplendens Hespenheide, 1982
- Neotrachys segregatus (Waterhouse, 1889)
- Neotrachys solisi Hespenheide, 2006
- Neotrachys strandi Obenberger, 1923
- Neotrachys wittmeri Cobos, 1959
