= Toxoscelus =

Scientific classification
- Kingdom: Animalia
- Phylum: Arthropoda
- Class: Insecta
- Order: Coleoptera
- Suborder: Polyphaga
- Infraorder: Elateriformia
- Family: Buprestidae
- Genus: Toxoscelus; Deyrolle, 1864

Genus of beetles

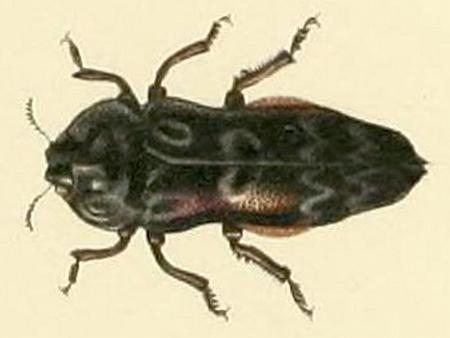
Toxoscelus undatus

Toxoscelus is a genus of beetles in the family Buprestidae, containing the following species:

- Toxoscelus acutipennis Fisher, 1922
- Toxoscelus amamiensis Kurosawa, 1963
- Toxoscelus auriceps (Saunders, 1873)
- Toxoscelus binodosus Descarpentries & Villiers, 1967
- Toxoscelus borneensis Obenberger, 1935
- Toxoscelus carbonarius Obenberger, 1958
- Toxoscelus centralis Deyrolle, 1864
- Toxoscelus cobosi Baudon, 1968
- Toxoscelus cupreoviridescens Obenberger, 1935
- Toxoscelus disponsae Baudon, 1962
- Toxoscelus eylandtus Bellamy & Peterson, 2000
- Toxoscelus funebris Deyrolle, 1864
- Toxoscelus fuscus Bourgoin, 1923
- Toxoscelus javanicus Obenberger, 1935
- Toxoscelus kurosawai Ohmomo & Akiyama, 1988
- Toxoscelus laosensis Baudon, 1968
- Toxoscelus mandarinus (Obenberger, 1917)
- Toxoscelus matobai Tôyama, 1985
- Toxoscelus miwai Kurosawa, 1977
- Toxoscelus nakajimai Ohmomo, 2002
- Toxoscelus omega Baudon, 1968
- Toxoscelus parvus Obenberger, 1924
- Toxoscelus purpureomicans Kerremans, 1890
- Toxoscelus queenslandicus Bellamy & Peterson, 2000
- Toxoscelus rondoni Baudon, 1968
- Toxoscelus rugicollis Saunders, 1874
- Toxoscelus sacer Obenberger, 1924
- Toxoscelus sasakii Kurosawa, 1957
- Toxoscelus similis Gebhardt, 1928
- Toxoscelus singularis Kerremans, 1900
- Toxoscelus speciosus Fisher, 1930
- Toxoscelus sterbai Obenberger, 1934
- Toxoscelus undatus Deyrolle, 1864
- Toxoscelus vicinus Obenberger, 1935
- Toxoscelus yakushimensis Kurosawa, 1957
- Toxoscelus yokoyamai Kurosawa, 1977
