= Paracephala =

Scientific classification
- Kingdom: Animalia
- Phylum: Arthropoda
- Class: Insecta
- Order: Coleoptera
- Suborder: Polyphaga
- Infraorder: Elateriformia
- Family: Buprestidae
- Genus: Paracephala; Saunders, 1868

Genus of beetles

Paracephala is a genus of beetles in the family Buprestidae, the jewel beetles. They are native to Australia. They are black to purplish in color and are associated with grasses.

Species include:

- Paracephala aenea Blackburn, 1891
- Paracephala borea Bellamy, 1988
- Paracephala deserta Bellamy, 1988
- Paracephala hesperia Bellamy, 1988
- Paracephala murina Thomson, 1878
- Paracephala occidentalis (Macleay, 1888)
- Paracephala pistacina (Hope, 1846)
