= Amorphosoma =

Scientific classification
- Kingdom: Animalia
- Phylum: Arthropoda
- Class: Insecta
- Order: Coleoptera
- Suborder: Polyphaga
- Infraorder: Elateriformia
- Family: Buprestidae
- Genus: Amorphosoma; Laporte, 1935

Genus of beetles

Amorphosoma is a genus of beetles in the family Buprestidae, containing the following species:

- Amorphosoma apicale Kerremans, 1897
- Amorphosoma gounellei Kerremans, 1897
- Amorphosoma minutum Kerremans, 1897
- Amorphosoma penicillatum (Klug, 1827)
- Amorphosoma tasmanicum Germar, 1848
- Amorphosoma undulatum Kerremans, 1897
