= Alissoderus =

Scientific classification
- Kingdom: Animalia
- Phylum: Arthropoda
- Class: Insecta
- Order: Coleoptera
- Suborder: Polyphaga
- Infraorder: Elateriformia
- Family: Buprestidae
- Genus: Alissoderus; Deyrolle, 1864

Genus of beetles

Alissoderus is a genus of beetles in the family Buprestidae, containing the following species:

- Alissoderus albiventris (Gory & Laporte, 1839)
- Alissoderus cuprascens (Gory & Laporte, 1839)
- Alissoderus leucogaster (Wiedemann, 1821)
- Alissoderus magnus Kerremans, 1911
- Alissoderus rex Obenberger, 1931
- Alissoderus spectrum (Fahreus, 1851)
- Alissoderus strandi Obenberger, 1931
- Alissoderus superciliosus (Wiedemann, 1821)
- Alissoderus tessellatus Bellamy, 2000
- Alissoderus transvalensis Obenberger, 1931
- Alissoderus vittatus Lansberge, 1886
