= Melibaeopsis =

Scientific classification
- Kingdom: Animalia
- Phylum: Arthropoda
- Class: Insecta
- Order: Coleoptera
- Suborder: Polyphaga
- Infraorder: Elateriformia
- Family: Buprestidae
- Genus: Melibaeopsis; Kerremans, 1903

Genus of beetles

Melibaeopsis is a genus of beetles in the family Buprestidae, containing the following species:

- Melibaeopsis angolana (Obenberger, 1931)
- Melibaeopsis benguelae (Obenberger, 1922)
- Melibaeopsis carinata (Quedenfeldt, 1888)
- Melibaeopsis chlorolineata (Quedenfeldt, 1886)
- Melibaeopsis costata (Kerremans, 1908)
- Melibaeopsis costipennis (Kerremans, 1907)
- Melibaeopsis monardi Thery, 1931
- Melibaeopsis nigroaenea Thery, 1940
- Melibaeopsis overlaeti Thery, 1940
- Melibaeopsis quarrei (Burgeon, 1941)
- Melibaeopsis rufipecta (Quedenfeldt, 1886)
- Melibaeopsis schoutedeni (Obenberger, 1922)
- Melibaeopsis tricolor Thery, 1947
