= Cobosietta =

Cobosietta inermis

Scientific classification
- Kingdom: Animalia
- Phylum: Arthropoda
- Class: Insecta
- Order: Coleoptera
- Suborder: Polyphaga
- Infraorder: Elateriformia
- Family: Buprestidae
- Genus: Cobosietta; Bellamy, 1986
- Species: C. inermis

Binomial name
- Cobosietta inermis (Cobos, 1967)

Genus of beetles

Cobosietta inermis is a species of beetle in the family Buprestidae, the only species in the genus Cobosietta.
