= Seranambia =

Scientific classification
- Kingdom: Animalia
- Phylum: Arthropoda
- Clade: Pancrustacea
- Class: Insecta
- Order: Coleoptera
- Suborder: Polyphaga
- Infraorder: Elateriformia
- Family: Buprestidae
- Genus: Seranambia; Descarpentries, 1974

Genus of beetles

Seranambia is a genus of beetles in the family Buprestidae, containing the following species:

- Seranambia nodosa Descarpentries, 1974
- Seranambia succinicola Descarpentries, 1974
