= Epimacha =

Scientific classification
- Kingdom: Animalia
- Phylum: Arthropoda
- Class: Insecta
- Order: Coleoptera
- Suborder: Polyphaga
- Infraorder: Elateriformia
- Family: Buprestidae
- Genus: Epimacha; Kerremans, 1900

Genus of beetles

Epimacha is a genus of beetles in the family Buprestidae, containing the following species:

- Epimacha helferi (Obenberger, 1935)
- Epimacha planata (Kerremans, 1900)
- Epimacha theryi (Kerremans, 1903)
