= Cantoniellus =

Scientific classification
- Kingdom: Animalia
- Phylum: Arthropoda
- Class: Insecta
- Order: Coleoptera
- Suborder: Polyphaga
- Infraorder: Elateriformia
- Family: Buprestidae
- Genus: Cantoniellus; Kalashian, 2004

Genus of beetles

Cantoniellus is a genus of beetles in the family Buprestidae, containing the following species:

- Cantoniellus cephalicus (Kerremans, 1892)
- Cantoniellus kubani (Kalashian, 2004)
