= Brachydora =

Scientific classification
- Kingdom: Animalia
- Phylum: Arthropoda
- Class: Insecta
- Order: Coleoptera
- Suborder: Polyphaga
- Infraorder: Elateriformia
- Family: Buprestidae
- Genus: Brachydora; Obenberger, 1923

Genus of beetles

Brachydora is a genus of beetles in the family Buprestidae, containing the following species:

- Brachydora crassa Thery, 1937
- Brachydora deformis (Fairmaire, 1901)
- Brachydora granulum (Fairmaire, 1902)
- Brachydora monstrum Obenberger, 1923
- Brachydora sicardi (Thery, 1912)
