= Kerremansia =

Scientific classification
- Kingdom: Animalia
- Phylum: Arthropoda
- Class: Insecta
- Order: Coleoptera
- Suborder: Polyphaga
- Infraorder: Elateriformia
- Family: Buprestidae
- Subtribe: Toxoscelina
- Genus: Kerremansia; Peringuey, 1908

Type species
- Kerremansia paradoxa Peringuey, 1908

Synonyms
- Species: Kerremansia junodi Obenberger, 1931

Genus of beetles

Kerremansia is a genus of beetle in the family Buprestidae. As of 2018, it is monospecific, consisting of the species Kerremansia paradoxa.
