= Taphroceroides =

Scientific classification
- Kingdom: Animalia
- Phylum: Arthropoda
- Class: Insecta
- Order: Coleoptera
- Suborder: Polyphaga
- Infraorder: Elateriformia
- Family: Buprestidae
- Genus: Taphroceroides; Hespenheide, 2008

Genus of beetles

Taphroceroides is a genus of beetles in the family Buprestidae, the jewel beetles. The genus was erected in 2008 for T. mimeticus, a new species from Costa Rica. Four other species have since been described from French Guiana and the Neotropics.

Species:

- Taphroceroides brasiliensis Migliore, Biffi & Curletti, 2020
- Taphroceroides brunneus Migliore, Biffi & Curletti, 2020
- Taphroceroides curlettii Brûlé, 2012
- Taphroceroides guyanensis Brûlé, 2012
- Taphroceroides mimeticus Hespenheide, 2008
