= Xenomerius =

Scientific classification
- Kingdom: Animalia
- Phylum: Arthropoda
- Class: Insecta
- Order: Coleoptera
- Suborder: Polyphaga
- Infraorder: Elateriformia
- Family: Buprestidae
- Genus: Xenomerius; Obenberger, 1924

Genus of beetles

Xenomerius is a genus of beetles in the family Buprestidae, containing the following species:

- Xenomerius baguenai (Cobos, 1959)
- Xenomerius bicolor Pochon, 1972
- Xenomerius ceballosi (Cobos, 1959)
- Xenomerius clermonti Obenberger, 1924
- Xenomerius cribratus (Waterhouse, 1887)
- Xenomerius guineae Kalashian, 1996
- Xenomerius laevipennis (Kerremans, 1892)
- Xenomerius pareumeroides Obenberger, 1924
- Xenomerius umtali Bellamy, 1990
