= Philippscelus =

Scientific classification
- Kingdom: Animalia
- Phylum: Arthropoda
- Class: Insecta
- Order: Coleoptera
- Suborder: Polyphaga
- Infraorder: Elateriformia
- Family: Buprestidae
- Genus: Philippscelus; Bellamy, 1998

Genus of beetles

Philippscelus is a genus of beetles in the family Buprestidae, containing the following species:

- Philippscelus fisheri (Hoscheck, 1931)
- Philippscelus gracilis Bellamy & Ohmomo, 2009
- Philippscelus panayensis Bellamy, 2005
