= Cantonius =

Scientific classification
- Kingdom: Animalia
- Phylum: Arthropoda
- Class: Insecta
- Order: Coleoptera
- Suborder: Polyphaga
- Infraorder: Elateriformia
- Family: Buprestidae
- Genus: Cantonius; Thery, 1929

Genus of beetles

Cantonius is a genus of beetles in the family Buprestidae, containing the following species:

- Cantonius bolmi Kalashian, 2004
- Cantonius fokienicus Kalashian, 2004
- Cantonius jendeki Kalashian, 2004
- Cantonius klapperichi Obenberger, 1940
- Cantonius khnzoriani Kalashian, 2004
- Cantonius megacephalus Kalashian, 2004
- Cantonius nitidifrons Kalashian, 2004
- Cantonius obenbergeri (Gebhardt, 1928)
- Cantonius obesus Obenberger, 1940
- Cantonius szechuanensis Obenberger, 1958
- Cantonius terryi Thery, 1929
