= Franchetia =

Scientific classification
- Kingdom: Animalia
- Phylum: Arthropoda
- Class: Insecta
- Order: Coleoptera
- Suborder: Polyphaga
- Infraorder: Elateriformia
- Family: Buprestidae
- Genus: Franchetia; Thery, 1946

Genus of beetles

Franchetia is a genus of beetles in the family Buprestidae, containing the following species:

- Franchetia carrioni (Cobos, 1960)
- Franchetia curta (Thery, 1954)
- Franchetia grossei (Obenberger, 1937)
- Franchetia marshalli (Thery, 1954)
- Franchetia monardi (Thery, 1947)
- Franchetia montivaga (Thery, 1954)
- Franchetia notata (Thery, 1954)
- Franchetia obesula (Cobos, 1953)
- Franchetia turneri (Thery, 1954)
- Franchetia viedmani (Cobos, 1960)
- Franchetia wittei (Thery, 1948)
