= Promeliboeus =

Scientific classification
- Kingdom: Animalia
- Phylum: Arthropoda
- Class: Insecta
- Order: Coleoptera
- Suborder: Polyphaga
- Infraorder: Elateriformia
- Family: Buprestidae
- Genus: Promeliboeus; Obenberger, 1924

Genus of beetles

Promeliboeus is a genus of beetles in the family Buprestidae, the jewel beetles. They are native to Africa. Some species have been observed feeding on the flowers of plants in the aster family. These beetles are a few millimeters long except P. colossus, which can be over a centimeter in length.

Species include:

- Promeliboeus braunsi Obenberger, 1945
- Promeliboeus colossus Bellamy, 1989
- Promeliboeus namaquensis Bellamy, 1989
- Promeliboeus parallelicollis Obenberger, 1931
- Promeliboeus strandi Obenberger, 1924
