= Kerremansella =

Kerremansella rufitarsis

Scientific classification
- Kingdom: Animalia
- Phylum: Arthropoda
- Class: Insecta
- Order: Coleoptera
- Suborder: Polyphaga
- Infraorder: Elateriformia
- Family: Buprestidae
- Genus: Kerremansella; Obenberger, 1923
- Species: K. rufitarsis

Binomial name
- Kerremansella rufitarsis (Obenberger, 1920)

Synonyms
- Kerremansia Obenberger, 1920 (Preocc.)

Genus of beetles

Kerremansella rufitarsis is a species of beetles in the family Buprestidae, the only species in the genus Kerremansella.
