= Pareumerus =

Pareumerus imperator

Scientific classification
- Kingdom: Animalia
- Phylum: Arthropoda
- Class: Insecta
- Order: Coleoptera
- Suborder: Polyphaga
- Infraorder: Elateriformia
- Family: Buprestidae
- Genus: Pareumerus; Deyrolle, 1864
- Species: P. imperator

Binomial name
- Pareumerus imperator (Gory & Laporte, 1839)

Genus of beetles

Pareumerus imperator is a species of beetle in the family Buprestidae, the only species in the genus Pareumerus.
