= Pseudoclema =

Scientific classification
- Kingdom: Animalia
- Phylum: Arthropoda
- Class: Insecta
- Order: Coleoptera
- Suborder: Polyphaga
- Infraorder: Elateriformia
- Family: Buprestidae
- Genus: Pseudoclema; Thery, 1938

Genus of beetles

Pseudoclema is a genus of beetles in the family Buprestidae, containing the following species:

- Pseudoclema theryi Cobos, 1954
- Pseudoclema transvaalense (Kerremans, 1911)
