= Falliellus =

Falliellus richardi

Scientific classification
- Kingdom: Animalia
- Phylum: Arthropoda
- Class: Insecta
- Order: Coleoptera
- Suborder: Polyphaga
- Infraorder: Elateriformia
- Family: Buprestidae
- Genus: Falliellus; Bellamy, 2001
- Species: F. richardi

Binomial name
- Falliellus richardi Bellamy, 2001

Genus of beetles

Falliellus richardi is a species of beetles in the family Buprestidae, the only species in the genus Falliellus.
