= Dejongiella =

Dejongiella cavifrons

Scientific classification
- Kingdom: Animalia
- Phylum: Arthropoda
- Class: Insecta
- Order: Coleoptera
- Suborder: Polyphaga
- Infraorder: Elateriformia
- Family: Buprestidae
- Genus: Dejongiella; Bellamy, 2003
- Species: D. cavifrons

Binomial name
- Dejongiella cavifrons (Fairmaire, 1904)

Genus of beetles

Dejongiella cavifrons is a species of beetles in the family Buprestidae, the only species in the genus Dejongiella.
