= Kamosia =

Scientific classification
- Kingdom: Animalia
- Phylum: Arthropoda
- Class: Insecta
- Order: Coleoptera
- Suborder: Polyphaga
- Infraorder: Elateriformia
- Family: Buprestidae
- Genus: Kamosia; Kerremans, 1898

Genus of beetles

Kamosia is a genus of beetles in the family Buprestidae, containing the following species:

- Kamosia abyssinica Kerremans, 1899
- Kamosia aethiopica (Kerremans, 1913)
- Kamosia alluaudi Kerremans, 1903
- Kamosia andreinii Kerremans, 1907
- Kamosia arrowi (Obenberger, 1924)
- Kamosia duvivieri Kerremans, 1898
- Kamosia indigacea (Obenberger, 1924)
- Kamosia infernalis (Obenberger, 1924)
- Kamosia jakobsoni Obenberger, 1935
- Kamosia kraatzi (Kerremans, 1899)
- Kamosia margotana Novak, 2010
- Kamosia mirabilis (Obenberger, 1919)
- Kamosia muelleri Obenberger, 1940
- Kamosia schultzei Kerremans, 1907
- Kamosia subinduta (Wallengren, 1881)
- Kamosia tenebricosa (Peringuey, 1908)
- Kamosia turneri Thery, 1941
- Kamosia vansoni Obenberger, 1935
- Kamosia zonata (Kerremans, 1914)
