= Cryptodactylus =

Scientific classification
- Kingdom: Animalia
- Phylum: Arthropoda
- Class: Insecta
- Order: Coleoptera
- Suborder: Polyphaga
- Infraorder: Elateriformia
- Family: Buprestidae
- Genus: Cryptodactylus; Deyrolle, 1864

Genus of beetles

Cryptodactylus is a genus of beetles in the family Buprestidae, containing the following species:

- Cryptodactylus aeneiventris Bourgoin, 1922
- Cryptodactylus albofasciatus Fisher, 1935
- Cryptodactylus binhensis Descarpentries & Villiers, 1966
- Cryptodactylus coeruleus Saunders, 1866
- Cryptodactylus coomani Descarpentries & Villiers, 1966
- Cryptodactylus cuprascens Kerremans, 1892
- Cryptodactylus cyaneoniger Kerremans, 1892
- Cryptodactylus fasciatus Baudon, 1968
- Cryptodactylus francoisi Baudon, 1968
- Cryptodactylus kerremansi Descarpentries & Villiers, 1966
- Cryptodactylus laosensis Baudon, 1961
- Cryptodactylus lugubris Deyrolle, 1864
- Cryptodactylus philippinensis Saunders, 1874
- Cryptodactylus planicollis Descarpentries & Villiers, 1966
- Cryptodactylus rondoni Baudon, 1968
- Cryptodactylus scutellaris Kerremans, 1892
- Cryptodactylus thomasi Baudon, 1965
- Cryptodactylus tonkinensis Descarpentries & Villiers, 1966
- Cryptodactylus tristis Deyrolle, 1864
- Cryptodactylus vitalisi Descarpentries & Villiers, 1966
- Cryptodactylus weyersi Kerremans, 1903
