= Cylindromorphoides =

Scientific classification
- Kingdom: Animalia
- Phylum: Arthropoda
- Class: Insecta
- Order: Coleoptera
- Suborder: Polyphaga
- Infraorder: Elateriformia
- Family: Buprestidae
- Genus: Cylindromorphoides; Kerremans, 1903

Genus of beetles

Cylindromorphoides is a genus of beetles in the family Buprestidae, containing the following species:

- Cylindromorphoides agriliformes (Kerremans, 1897)
- Cylindromorphoides katrinae Hornburg, 2003
