= Paraxenita =

Paraxenita lithostrota

Scientific classification
- Kingdom: Animalia
- Phylum: Arthropoda
- Class: Insecta
- Order: Coleoptera
- Suborder: Polyphaga
- Infraorder: Elateriformia
- Family: Buprestidae
- Genus: Paraxenita; Bellamy, 1988
- Species: P. lithostrota

Binomial name
- Paraxenita lithostrota Bellamy, 1988

Genus of beetles

Paraxenita lithostrota is a species of beetles in the family Buprestidae, the only species in the genus Paraxenita.
