= Katonia =

Scientific classification
- Kingdom: Animalia
- Phylum: Arthropoda
- Class: Insecta
- Order: Coleoptera
- Suborder: Polyphaga
- Infraorder: Elateriformia
- Family: Buprestidae
- Genus: Katonia; Thery, 1941

Genus of beetles

Katonia is a genus of beetles in the family Buprestidae, containing the following species:

- Katonia tricolour (Thery, 1941)
- Katonia usambarae (Obenberger, 1922)
