= Zitella =

Scientific classification
- Kingdom: Animalia
- Phylum: Arthropoda
- Class: Insecta
- Order: Coleoptera
- Suborder: Polyphaga
- Infraorder: Elateriformia
- Family: Buprestidae
- Genus: Zitella; Bellamy, 1992

Genus of beetles

Zitella is a genus of beetles in the family Buprestidae, containing the following species:

- Zitella denticulata (Thery, 1954)
- Zitella gestroi (Thery, 1954)
- Zitella obenbergeri (Thery, 1954)
- Zitella strandi (Obenberger, 1928)
