= Parademostis =

Parademostis capucina

Scientific classification
- Kingdom: Animalia
- Phylum: Arthropoda
- Clade: Pancrustacea
- Class: Insecta
- Order: Coleoptera
- Suborder: Polyphaga
- Infraorder: Elateriformia
- Family: Buprestidae
- Genus: Parademostis; Obenberger, 1931
- Species: P. capucina

Binomial name
- Parademostis capucina (Fahraeus, 1851)

Genus of beetles

Parademostis capucina is a species of beetles in the family Buprestidae, the only species in the genus Parademostis.
