= Compsoglypha =

Scientific classification
- Kingdom: Animalia
- Phylum: Arthropoda
- Class: Insecta
- Order: Coleoptera
- Suborder: Polyphaga
- Infraorder: Elateriformia
- Family: Buprestidae
- Genus: Compsoglypha; Fairmaire, 1904

Genus of beetles

Compsoglypha is a genus of beetles in the family Buprestidae, containing the following species:

- Compsoglypha nigrocaerulea Bellamy, 2006
- Compsoglypha perrieri Fairmaire, 1904
