= Coroebina =

Scientific classification
- Kingdom: Animalia
- Phylum: Arthropoda
- Class: Insecta
- Order: Coleoptera
- Suborder: Polyphaga
- Infraorder: Elateriformia
- Family: Buprestidae
- Genus: Coroebina; Obenberger, 1923

Synonyms
- Coraebina Obenberger, 1923 [lapsus]

Genus of beetles

Coroebina is a genus of beetles in the family Buprestidae.

== Species ==
- Coroebina affinis Obenberger, 1958
- Coroebina beatricis Obenberger, 1944
- Coroebina bilyi Akiyama & Ohmomo, 1993
- Coroebina birmaniae Obenberger, 1923
- Coroebina biroi Obenberger, 1958
- Coroebina bolovenensis Baudon, 1968
- Coroebina cambodiensis Descarpentries & Villiers, 1967
- Coroebina chloropicta (Kerremans, 1892)
- Coroebina fulgidiceps (Kerremans, 1892)
- Coroebina gentilis (Kerremans, 1890)
- Coroebina gongis (Gory, 1841)
- Coroebina ikomai Descarpentries & Chujo, 1961
- Coroebina kashmirensis Obenberger, 1934
- Coroebina kaszabi Obenberger, 1958
- Coroebina komiyai Akiyama & Ohmomo, 1994
- Coroebina leonensis Obenberger, 1958
- Coroebina malabarica Obenberger, 1934
- Coroebina minutesculpta Obenberger, 1958
- Coroebina monotona Obenberger, 1958
- Coroebina nickerli Obenberger, 1923
- Coroebina rondoni Baudon, 1965
- Coroebina saraswati Obenberger, 1958
- Coroebina specialis Obenberger, 1934
- Coroebina yunnanensis Obenberger, 1934
