= Melanocoraebus =

Melanocoraebus thomasi

Scientific classification
- Kingdom: Animalia
- Phylum: Arthropoda
- Class: Insecta
- Order: Coleoptera
- Suborder: Polyphaga
- Infraorder: Elateriformia
- Family: Buprestidae
- Genus: Melanocoraebus; Baudon, 1968
- Species: M. thomasi

Binomial name
- Melanocoraebus thomasi Baudon, 1968

Genus of beetles

Melanocoraebus thomasi is a species of beetle in the family Buprestidae, the only species in the genus Melanocoraebus.
