= Anocisseis =

Scientific classification
- Kingdom: Animalia
- Phylum: Arthropoda
- Class: Insecta
- Order: Coleoptera
- Suborder: Polyphaga
- Infraorder: Elateriformia
- Family: Buprestidae
- Genus: Anocisseis; Bellamy, 1990

Genus of beetles

Anocisseis is a genus of beetles in the family Buprestidae, containing the following species:

- Anocisseis danieli Bily, 1997
- Anocisseis pretiosissima (Kerremans, 1900)
- Anocisseis samarensis Bellamy, 1990
