= Katangiella =

Scientific classification
- Kingdom: Animalia
- Phylum: Arthropoda
- Class: Insecta
- Order: Coleoptera
- Suborder: Polyphaga
- Infraorder: Elateriformia
- Family: Buprestidae
- Genus: Katangiella; Bellamy, 1988
- Species: K. squamivela

Binomial name
- Katangiella squamivela Bellamy, 1988

Genus of beetles

Katangiella squamivela is a species of beetles in the family Buprestidae, the only species in the genus Katangiella. It is an African species described in 1988.
