= Eudiadora =

Scientific classification
- Kingdom: Animalia
- Phylum: Arthropoda
- Class: Insecta
- Order: Coleoptera
- Suborder: Polyphaga
- Infraorder: Elateriformia
- Family: Buprestidae
- Genus: Eudiadora; Obenberger, 1924

Genus of beetles

Eudiadora is a genus of beetles in the family Buprestidae, containing the following species:

- Eudiadora bronzeola Cobos, 1959
- Eudiadora kerremansi Obenberger, 1932
- Eudiadora meliboeoides Obenberger, 1947
- Eudiadora pulchra (Obenberger, 1922)
