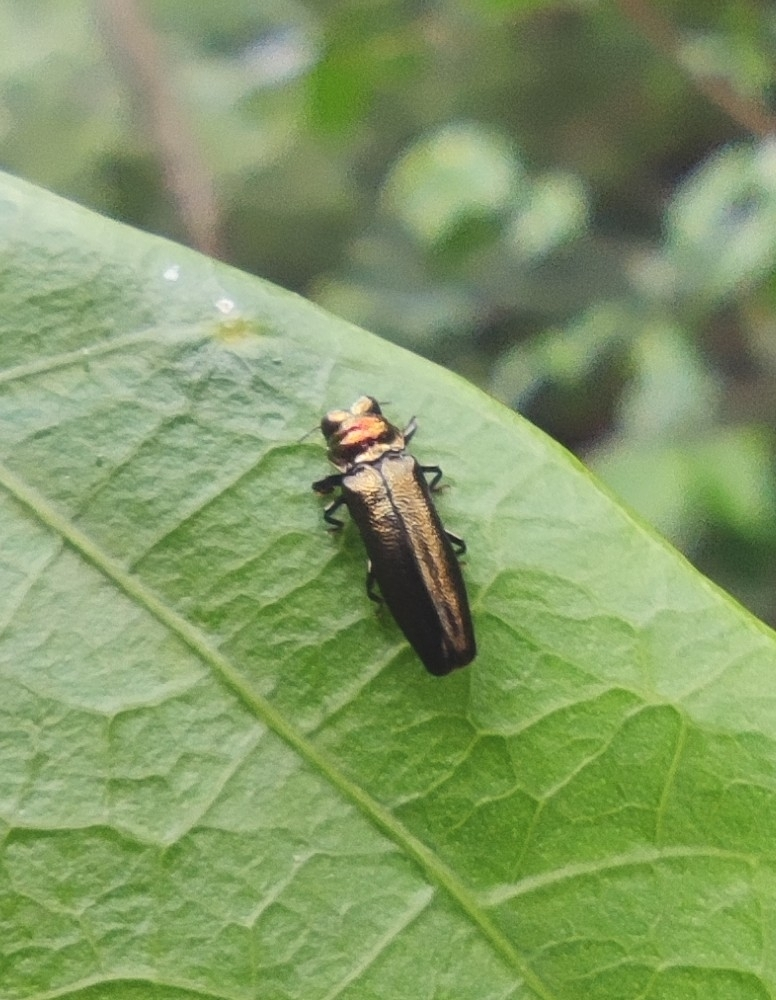
- Endelus continentalis, China

Scientific classification
- Kingdom: Animalia
- Phylum: Arthropoda
- Class: Insecta
- Order: Coleoptera
- Suborder: Polyphaga
- Infraorder: Elateriformia
- Family: Buprestidae
- Tribe: Aphanisticini
- Subtribe: Aphanisticina
- Genus: Endelus; Deyrolle, 1864

= Endelus =

Genus of beetles

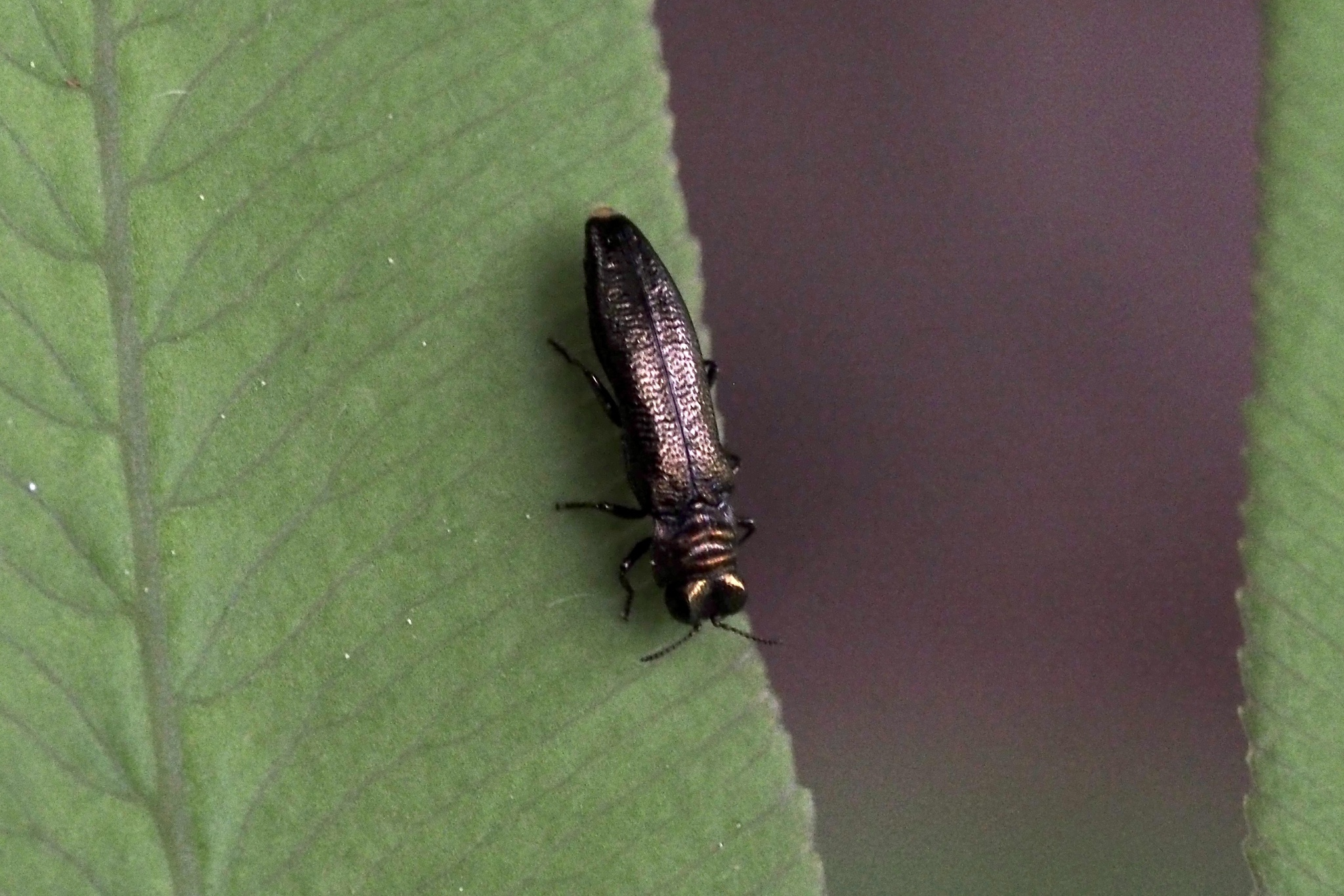
Endelus collaris, Japan

Endelus is a genus of metallic wood-boring beetles in the family Buprestidae. There are more than 120 described species in Endelus, found in Australia, Oceania, and east Asia.

== Species ==
These 128 species belong to the genus Endelus:

- Endelus acutiplicis Obenberger, 1944
- Endelus aeneipennis Fisher, 1921
- Endelus aeneolus Obenberger, 1922
- Endelus aeneopacus Kurosawa, 1985
- Endelus aethiops Deyrolle, 1864
- Endelus agriliformis Fisher, 1921
- Endelus andamanensis Théry, 1932
- Endelus aokii Kurosawa, 1985
- Endelus aphanisticinus Obenberger, 1924
- Endelus apicalis Deyrolle, 1864
- Endelus assamensis Obenberger, 1922
- Endelus aurovittatus Théry, 1932
- Endelus bakeri Kerremans, 1914
- Endelus bartoni Obenberger, 1932
- Endelus baumi Obenberger, 1929
- Endelus belial Obenberger, 1924
- Endelus bicarinatus Théry, 1932
- Endelus bilyi Kalashian, 1995
- Endelus birmanicus Kalashian, 1999
- Endelus borneensis Obenberger, 1924
- Endelus bos Théry, 1932
- Endelus brodskyi Kalashian, 1999
- Endelus brutus Deyrolle, 1864
- Endelus bryanti Théry, 1932
- Endelus bucephalus Obenberger, 1932
- Endelus calligraphus Banks, 1919
- Endelus carteri Holynski, 2003
- Endelus castaneocupreus Bellamy, 2007
- Endelus celebensis Théry, 1932
- Endelus chalybaeotinctus Obenberger, 1932
- Endelus chikatunovi Kalashian, 2020
- Endelus cicindeloides Théry, 1932
- Endelus coeruleoniger Descarpentries & Villiers, 1963
- Endelus coeruleus Kerremans, 1900
- Endelus collaris (Saunders, 1873)
- Endelus collinus Obenberger, 1922
- Endelus coomani Théry, 1932
- Endelus coomanianus Descarpentries, 1948
- Endelus cornutus Kerremans, 1900
- Endelus corporaali Obenberger, 1922
- Endelus cupido Deyrolle, 1864
- Endelus cupreocingulatus Bellamy, 2007
- Endelus cupreoviridis Bellamy, 2007
- Endelus curtus Kerremans, 1892
- Endelus daoensis Kalashian, 1997
- Endelus diabolicus Kerremans, 1900
- Endelus difformis Deyrolle, 1864
- Endelus dohertyi Théry, 1932
- Endelus dohrni Théry, 1932
- Endelus drescheri Obenberger, 1932
- Endelus eduardi Kalashian, 1999
- Endelus elongatus Kerremans, 1900
- Endelus empyreus Deyrolle, 1864
- Endelus endymio Deyrolle, 1864
- Endelus fijiensis Bellamy, 2007
- Endelus formosae Obenberger, 1940
- Endelus foveolatus Kalashian, 1995
- Endelus gestroi Obenberger, 1924
- Endelus gracilipes Obenberger, 1940
- Endelus gratiosus Théry, 1932
- Endelus gyoerfii Apt, 1954
- Endelus gyulnarae Kalashian, 1995
- Endelus harmandi Théry, 1927
- Endelus hedwigae Obenberger, 1941
- Endelus helferi Cobos, 1964
- Endelus himalayanus Bílý, 1983
- Endelus ianthinipennis Obenberger, 1922
- Endelus imperator Obenberger, 1937
- Endelus inaequalipennis Obenberger, 1937
- Endelus intermedius Deyrolle, 1864
- Endelus japonicus Obenberger, 1944
- Endelus jendeki Kalashian, 1997
- Endelus karagyanae Kalashian, 2013
- Endelus kareni Kalashian, 1997
- Endelus kerremansellus Obenberger, 1935
- Endelus klapperichi Obenberger, 1944
- Endelus kubani Kalashian, 1995
- Endelus lameyi Théry, 1932
- Endelus laosensis Baudon, 1968
- Endelus lineolus Obenberger, 1932
- Endelus lobanovi Kalashian, 2021
- Endelus lopatini Kalashian, 2013
- Endelus louwerensi Obenberger, 1937
- Endelus lunatus Fisher, 1921
- Endelus marseulii Deyrolle, 1864
- Endelus mephistopheles Gestro, 1877
- Endelus minutus Kerremans, 1900
- Endelus morio Obenberger, 1922
- Endelus morulus Fisher, 1935
- Endelus nepalensis Bílý, 1983
- Endelus nitidus Kerremans, 1896
- Endelus olexai Kalashian, 1999
- Endelus opacipennis Kurosawa, 1985
- Endelus ornatipennis Fisher, 1926
- Endelus ovalis Théry, 1932
- Endelus pacholatkoi Kalashian, 1999
- Endelus palawanensis Fisher, 1921
- Endelus papua Obenberger, 1940
- Endelus parallelus Kerremans, 1900
- Endelus pendleburyi Fisher, 1936
- Endelus perroti Descarpentries & Villiers, 1963
- Endelus pseudoperroti Kalashian, 1999
- Endelus pyrrosiae Kurosawa, 1985
- Endelus quadraticollis Kerremans, 1894
- Endelus sapaensis Kalashian, 1995
- Endelus sauteri Kerremans, 1912
- Endelus scintillans Deyrolle, 1864
- Endelus signatus Kerremans, 1900
- Endelus similis Descarpentries & Villiers, 1963
- Endelus sinensis Théry, 1932
- Endelus smaragdinus Descarpentries & Villiers, 1963
- Endelus sommeri Obenberger, 1940
- Endelus speculifer Théry, 1932
- Endelus strandiellus Obenberger, 1932
- Endelus subcornutus Kerremans, 1900
- Endelus subviolaceus Cobos, 1964
- Endelus sulcicollis Heller, 1900
- Endelus sumatrae Obenberger, 1940
- Endelus sumatrensis Fisher, 1926
- Endelus suturalis Théry, 1932
- Endelus taurus Théry, 1932
- Endelus toxopeusi Obenberger, 1932
- Endelus tristis (Kerremans, 1900)
- Endelus violaceipennis Fisher, 1921
- Endelus viridimaculatus Deyrolle, 1864
- Endelus viridiventris Théry, 1932
- Endelus weyersi Ritsema, 1888
- Endelus wittmeri Bílý, 1983
