= Eumorphocerus =

Scientific classification
- Kingdom: Animalia
- Phylum: Arthropoda
- Class: Insecta
- Order: Coleoptera
- Suborder: Polyphaga
- Infraorder: Elateriformia
- Family: Buprestidae
- Genus: Eumorphocerus; Thery, 1930

Genus of beetles

Eumorphocerus is a genus of beetles in the family Buprestidae, containing the following species:

- Eumorphocerus costipennis Descarpentries, 1968
- Eumorphocerus laticornis Thery, 1930
- Eumorphocerus peyrierasi Descarpentries, 1968
- Eumorphocerus vadoni Descarpentries, 1968
