= Ivalouwayneia =

Ivalouwayneia ruficapiticauda

Scientific classification
- Kingdom: Animalia
- Phylum: Arthropoda
- Class: Insecta
- Order: Coleoptera
- Suborder: Polyphaga
- Infraorder: Elateriformia
- Family: Buprestidae
- Genus: Ivalouwayneia; Bellamy, 2006
- Species: I. ruficapiticauda

Binomial name
- Ivalouwayneia ruficapiticauda Bellamy, 2006

Genus of beetles

Ivalouwayneia ruficapiticauda is a species of beetles in the family Buprestidae, the only species in the genus Ivalouwayneia.
