= Sibuyanella =

Scientific classification
- Kingdom: Animalia
- Phylum: Arthropoda
- Class: Insecta
- Order: Coleoptera
- Suborder: Polyphaga
- Infraorder: Elateriformia
- Family: Buprestidae
- Genus: Sibuyanella; Obenberger, 1942

Genus of beetles

Sibuyanella is a genus of beetles in the family Buprestidae, the jewel beetles. They are native to the Philippines.

Species include:

- Sibuyanella bakeri (Fisher, 1924)
- Sibuyanella boudanti Bellamy, 2005
- Sibuyanella mimica Bellamy, 2005
