= Madaphlocteis =

Scientific classification
- Kingdom: Animalia
- Phylum: Arthropoda
- Class: Insecta
- Order: Coleoptera
- Suborder: Polyphaga
- Infraorder: Elateriformia
- Family: Buprestidae
- Genus: Madaphlocteis; Bellamy, 2006

Genus of beetles

Madaphlocteis is a genus of beetles in the family Buprestidae, containing the following species:

- Madaphlocteis ambanjana (Obenberger, 1944)
- Madaphlocteis ampliata (Fairmaire, 1905)
- Madaphlocteis iridipennis (Obenberger, 1944)
- Madaphlocteis mucorea (Fairmaire, 1902)
- Madaphlocteis ochraceopicta (Fairmaire, 1888)
- Madaphlocteis perrieri (Fairmaire, 1900)
- Madaphlocteis polychroa (Fairmaire, 1904)
- Madaphlocteis purpureosignata (Hoscheck, 1931)
- Madaphlocteis simplicifrons (Fairmaire, 1901)
