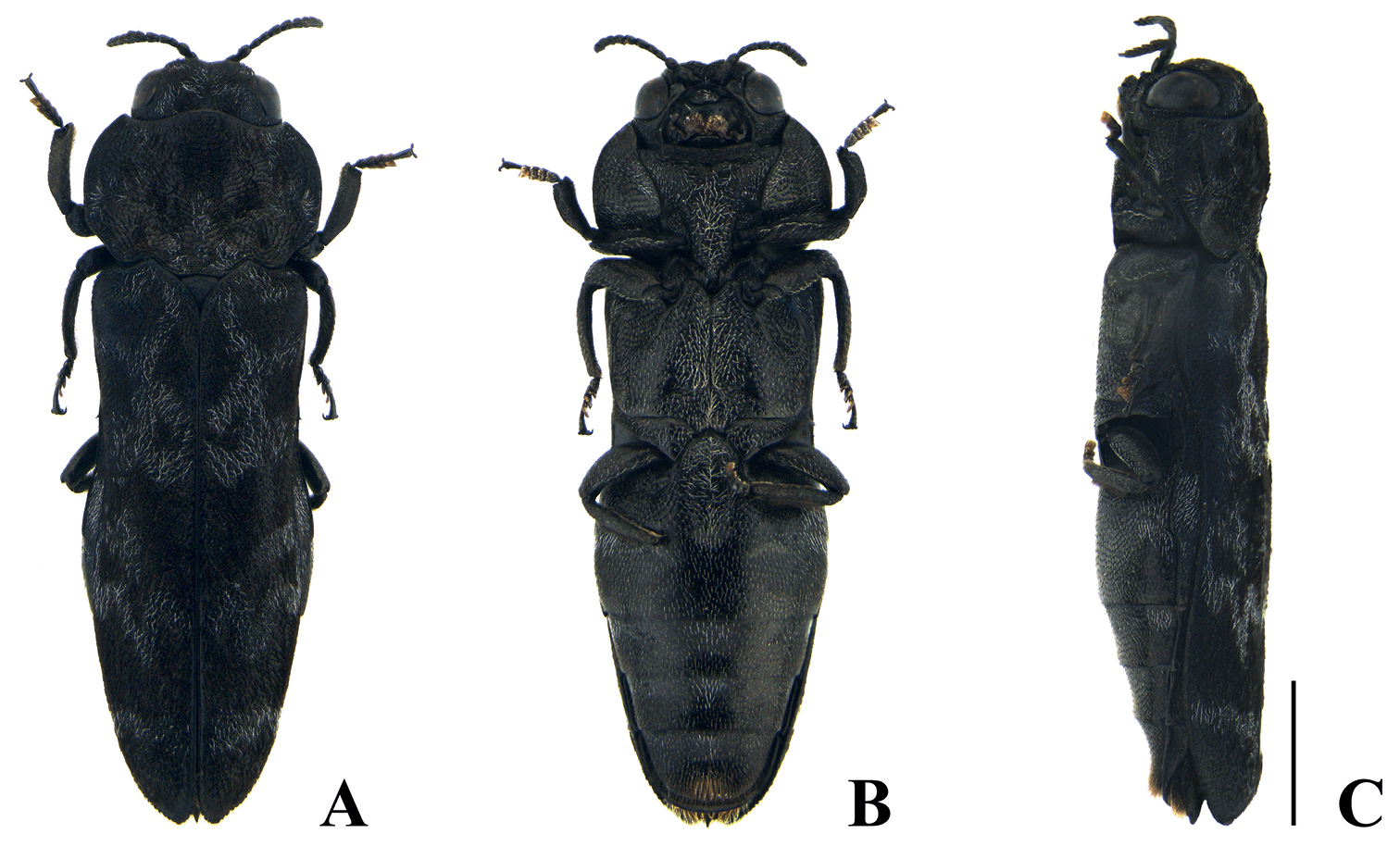
- A male Neotoxoscelus petilus

Scientific classification
- Kingdom: Animalia
- Phylum: Arthropoda
- Class: Insecta
- Order: Coleoptera
- Suborder: Polyphaga
- Infraorder: Elateriformia
- Family: Buprestidae
- Genus: Neotoxoscelus; Fisher, 1921

= Neotoxoscelus =

Genus of beetles

Neotoxoscelus is a genus of beetles in the family Buprestidae, containing the following species:

- Neotoxoscelus aeneiventris Fisher, 1930
- Neotoxoscelus bakeri Fisher, 1921
- Neotoxoscelus corporaali Obenberger, 1922
- Neotoxoscelus kerzhneri (Alexeev, 1975)
- Neotoxoscelus kurosawai (Hattori, 1990)
- Neotoxoscelus luzonicus Fisher, 1921
- Neotoxoscelus ornatus Fisher, 1930
- Neotoxoscelus shirahatai (Kurosawa, 1977)
