= Chloricala =

Scientific classification
- Kingdom: Animalia
- Phylum: Arthropoda
- Class: Insecta
- Order: Coleoptera
- Suborder: Polyphaga
- Infraorder: Elateriformia
- Family: Buprestidae
- Genus: Chloricala; Kerremans, 1893

Genus of beetles

Chloricala is a genus of beetles in the family Buprestidae, containing the following species:

- Chloricala balachowskyi Descarpentries, 1974
- Chloricala gratiosa Kerremans, 1893
