= Shimogia =

Shimogia fasciata

Scientific classification
- Kingdom: Animalia
- Phylum: Arthropoda
- Class: Insecta
- Order: Coleoptera
- Suborder: Polyphaga
- Infraorder: Elateriformia
- Family: Buprestidae
- Genus: Shimogia; Obenberger, 1942
- Species: S. fasciata

Binomial name
- Shimogia fasciata (Guerin-Meneville, 1840)

Genus of beetles

Shimogia fasciata is a species of beetles in the family Buprestidae, the only species in the genus Shimogia.
