= Neocoraebus =

Neocoraebus abyssinicus

Scientific classification
- Kingdom: Animalia
- Phylum: Arthropoda
- Class: Insecta
- Order: Coleoptera
- Suborder: Polyphaga
- Infraorder: Elateriformia
- Family: Buprestidae
- Genus: Neocoraebus; Kerremans, 1903
- Species: N. abyssinicus

Binomial name
- Neocoraebus abyssinicus (Kerremans, 1899)

Genus of beetles

Neocoraebus abyssinicus is a species of beetle in the family Buprestidae, the only species in the genus Neocoraebus.
