= Trypantius =

Scientific classification
- Kingdom: Animalia
- Phylum: Arthropoda
- Class: Insecta
- Order: Coleoptera
- Suborder: Polyphaga
- Infraorder: Elateriformia
- Family: Buprestidae
- Genus: Trypantius; Waterhouse, 1887

Genus of beetles

Trypantius is a genus of beetles in the family Buprestidae, containing the following species:

- Trypantius bitaeniatus (Chevrolat, 1835)
- Trypantius brasiliensis Obenberger, 1924
- Trypantius infrequens Waterhouse, 1887
