= Cupriscobina =

Cupriscobina loranthae

Scientific classification
- Kingdom: Animalia
- Phylum: Arthropoda
- Class: Insecta
- Order: Coleoptera
- Suborder: Polyphaga
- Infraorder: Elateriformia
- Family: Buprestidae
- Genus: Cupriscobina; Bellamy & Holm, 1985
- Species: C. loranthae

Binomial name
- Cupriscobina loranthae Bellamy & Holm, 1985

Genus of beetles

Cupriscobina loranthae is a species of beetles in the family Buprestidae, the only species in the genus Cupriscobina.
