= Neefia =

Scientific classification
- Kingdom: Animalia
- Phylum: Arthropoda
- Clade: Pancrustacea
- Class: Insecta
- Order: Coleoptera
- Suborder: Polyphaga
- Infraorder: Elateriformia
- Family: Buprestidae
- Genus: Neefia; Bellamy, 2003

Genus of beetles

Neefia is a genus of beetles in the family Buprestidae, the jewel beetles. The genus was established in 2003 for seven new species discovered in Madagascar.

Species include:

- Neefia gracilis Bellamy, 2003
- Neefia humeralis Bellamy, 2003
- Neefia magna Bellamy, 2003
- Neefia montana Bellamy, 2003
- Neefia rufofascia Bellamy, 2003
- Neefia rufovestita Bellamy, 2003
- Neefia semivestita Bellamy, 2003
