= Strigulioides =

Strigulioides gabonica

Scientific classification
- Kingdom: Animalia
- Phylum: Arthropoda
- Class: Insecta
- Order: Coleoptera
- Suborder: Polyphaga
- Infraorder: Elateriformia
- Family: Buprestidae
- Genus: Strigulioides; Bellamy, 1986
- Species: S. gabonica

Binomial name
- Strigulioides gabonica (Kerremans, 1903)

Synonyms
- Discoderes gabonica

Genus of beetles

Strigulioides is a monotypic genus of beetles in the family Buprestidae, the jewel beetles. The sole species, Strigulioides gabonica, was transferred to its own genus from Discoderes in 1986.
