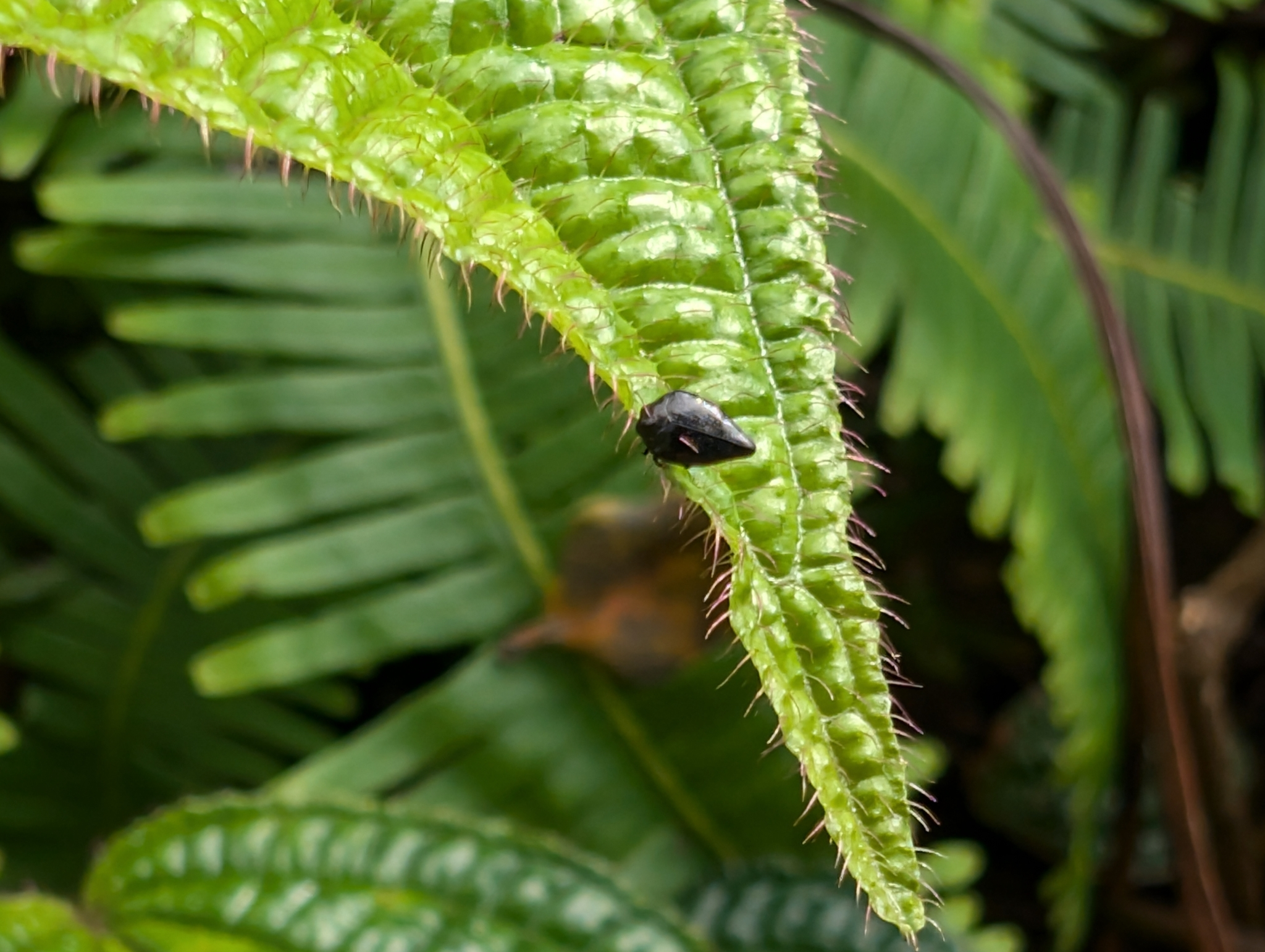
- Lius poseidon, Hawaii

Scientific classification
- Domain: Eukaryota
- Kingdom: Animalia
- Phylum: Arthropoda
- Class: Insecta
- Order: Coleoptera
- Suborder: Polyphaga
- Infraorder: Elateriformia
- Family: Buprestidae
- Tribe: Tracheini
- Subtribe: Brachina
- Genus: Lius; Deyrolle, 1865

Synonyms
- Lius Dejean, 1833

= Lius =

Genus of beetles

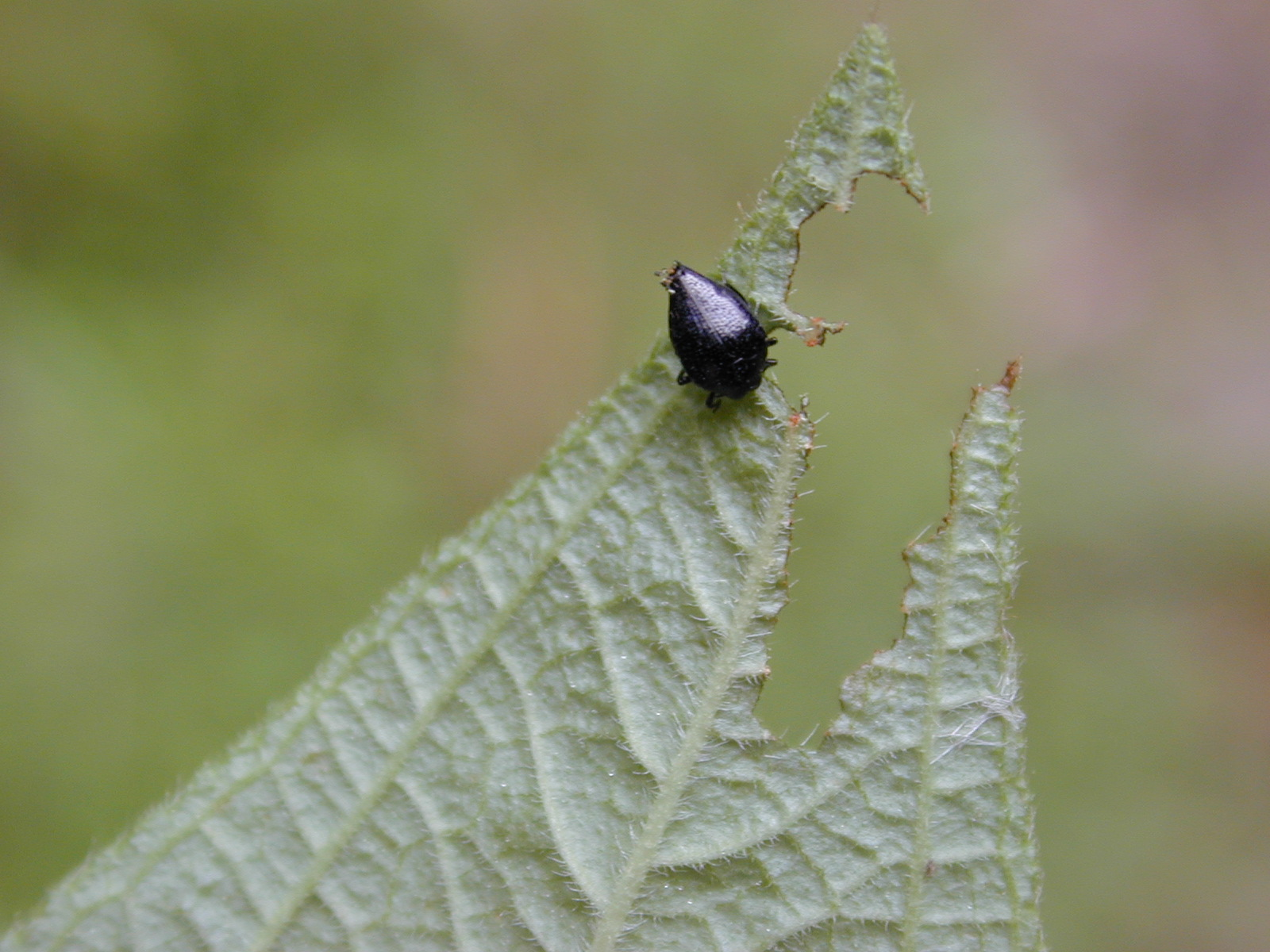
Lius poseidon, Hawaii

Lius is a genus of metallic wood-boring beetles in the family Buprestidae. There are more than 120 described species in Lius, found in the Neotropics and Hawaii.

== Species ==
These 126 species belong to the genus Lius:

- Lius aculeatus (Gory, 1841)
- Lius adonis Saunders, 1876
- Lius aeneicollis Kerremans, 1896
- Lius aeneovirens Obenberger, 1932
- Lius aeneus Kerremans, 1896
- Lius agriloides Kerremans, 1896
- Lius alvarengai Cobos, 1967
- Lius amabilis Kerremans, 1896
- Lius amazoniae Obenberger, 1932
- Lius aquiles Cobos, 1967
- Lius ares Saunders, 1876
- Lius aterrimus Kerremans, 1900
- Lius atratus Kerremans, 1896
- Lius atrocyaneus Kerremans, 1899
- Lius auroseriatus Obenberger, 1940
- Lius bacchus Saunders, 1876
- Lius belial Obenberger, 1940
- Lius bergrothi Obenberger, 1924
- Lius bicolor (Kirsch, 1873)
- Lius binderi Obenberger, 1924
- Lius bolivianus Obenberger, 1932
- Lius breviceps Kerremans, 1903
- Lius bronzeus Kerremans, 1903
- Lius bruchi Kerremans, 1903
- Lius bucki Cobos, 1967
- Lius buenavistae Obenberger, 1932
- Lius callimicriformis Fisher, 1933
- Lius carinatus Kerremans, 1903
- Lius carmineus Kerremans, 1896
- Lius castor Saunders, 1876
- Lius clarus Kerremans, 1897
- Lius coelestis Obenberger, 1923
- Lius coeruleus Kerremans, 1900
- Lius conicus (Gory & Laporte, 1840)
- Lius convexus Kerremans, 1899
- Lius cordieri Obenberger, 1924
- Lius cuneiformis Fisher, 1922
- Lius cupreolus Obenberger, 1923
- Lius cupreus Kerremans, 1903
- Lius cupricollis Thomson, 1879
- Lius cyanellus Kerremans, 1896
- Lius cycnus Saunders, 1876
- Lius dichrous Obenberger, 1924
- Lius difficilis (Waterhouse, 1889)
- Lius dimidiatus Kerremans, 1897
- Lius dissimilis Waterhouse, 1889
- Lius elateroides Kerremans, 1896
- Lius elongatus Kerremans, 1896
- Lius emarginatus (Kirsch, 1873)
- Lius eolo Cobos, 1967
- Lius ephialtes Saunders, 1876
- Lius exiguus (Gory & Laporte, 1840)
- Lius fennahi Théry, 1947
- Lius finitimus Obenberger, 1923
- Lius geraensis Obenberger, 1940
- Lius gounelli Kerremans, 1903
- Lius grouvellei Kerremans, 1896
- Lius hades Saunders, 1876
- Lius hector Napp, 1972
- Lius helios Saunders, 1876
- Lius hercules Saunders, 1876
- Lius hespenheidei Bellamy, 1998
- Lius hintoni Fisher, 1933
- Lius holochalceus Kerremans, 1896
- Lius ignifrons Thomson, 1879
- Lius ignitus (Gory & Laporte, 1840)
- Lius inconspicuus (Waterhouse, 1889)
- Lius jakowleffi Kerremans, 1903
- Lius joukli Obenberger, 1924
- Lius jubilans (Waterhouse, 1889)
- Lius lafertei Thomson, 1878
- Lius laticeps Kerremans, 1903
- Lius lenkoi Cobos, 1967
- Lius leo Cobos, 1967
- Lius longulus (Waterhouse, 1889)
- Lius maerens (Gory, 1841)
- Lius magdalenae Obenberger, 1932
- Lius magnus Kerremans, 1897
- Lius mequignoni Obenberger, 1932
- Lius mexicanus Fisher, 1922
- Lius minutus Kerremans, 1896
- Lius modestus Kerremans, 1897
- Lius mrazi Obenberger, 1923
- Lius nigerrimus Kerremans, 1896
- Lius observans (Kirsch, 1873)
- Lius orion Obenberger, 1923
- Lius otus Saunders, 1876
- Lius paraguayensis Obenberger, 1923
- Lius parvulus Waterhouse, 1889
- Lius pauli Obenberger, 1923
- Lius pereirai Cobos, 1967
- Lius phlegmon Obenberger, 1923
- Lius pilithorax Obenberger, 1932
- Lius placidus (Waterhouse, 1889)
- Lius pluto Cobos, 1967
- Lius politus Saunders, 1876
- Lius pollux Saunders, 1876
- Lius poseidon Napp, 1972
- Lius preissi Obenberger, 1923
- Lius protractulus Obenberger, 1940
- Lius proximus Thomson, 1879
- Lius puberulus Obenberger, 1923
- Lius purpurescens Thomson, 1879
- Lius reflexus Kerremans, 1903
- Lius rugosus Kerremans, 1903
- Lius sagittus Obenberger, 1923
- Lius semenovi Obenberger, 1932
- Lius simplex Thomson, 1879
- Lius simulator Obenberger, 1924
- Lius skrlandti Obenberger, 1932
- Lius splendens Fisher, 1933
- Lius strandi Obenberger, 1923
- Lius strigosus Kerremans, 1903
- Lius subtilipilis Obenberger, 1940
- Lius tantillus Obenberger, 1924
- Lius tenebrosus Cobos, 1967
- Lius tenuifrons Obenberger, 1932
- Lius tercus Saunders, 1876
- Lius tomentosus Thomson, 1879
- Lius tristis Kerremans, 1897
- Lius tucumanus (Kerremans, 1887)
- Lius vanrooni Obenberger, 1923
- Lius variabilis Waterhouse, 1889
- Lius vicinus Kerremans, 1899
- Lius viridis Kerremans, 1897
- Lius waterhousei Hespenheide, 1973
