= Xenita =

Xenita keniensis

Scientific classification
- Kingdom: Animalia
- Phylum: Arthropoda
- Class: Insecta
- Order: Coleoptera
- Suborder: Polyphaga
- Infraorder: Elateriformia
- Family: Buprestidae
- Genus: Xenita; Thery, 1941
- Species: X. keniensis

Binomial name
- Xenita keniensis Thery, 1941

Genus of beetles

Xenita keniensis is a species of beetles in the family Buprestidae, the only species in the genus Xenita.
