= Pachycisseis =

Pachycisseis bicolor

Scientific classification
- Kingdom: Animalia
- Phylum: Arthropoda
- Class: Insecta
- Order: Coleoptera
- Suborder: Polyphaga
- Infraorder: Elateriformia
- Family: Buprestidae
- Genus: Pachycisseis; Thery, 1929
- Species: P. bicolor

Binomial name
- Pachycisseis bicolor (Gory & Laporte, 1839)

Genus of beetles

Pachycisseis bicolor is a species of beetles in the family Buprestidae, the only species in the genus Pachycisseis.
