= Vanroonia =

Scientific classification
- Kingdom: Animalia
- Phylum: Arthropoda
- Class: Insecta
- Order: Coleoptera
- Suborder: Polyphaga
- Infraorder: Elateriformia
- Family: Buprestidae
- Genus: Vanroonia; Obenberger, 1923

Genus of beetles

Vanroonia is a genus of beetles in the family Buprestidae, containing the following species:

- Vanroonia afghanica Alexeev & Volkovitsh in Alexeev, et al., 1992
- Vanroonia africana (Obenberger, 1928)
- Vanroonia bispinosa (Wiedemann, 1823)
- Vanroonia cochinchinae (Descarpentries & Villiers, 1967)
- Vanroonia coomani (Descarpentries & Villiers, 1967)
- Vanroonia coraeboides Obenberger, 1923
- Vanroonia guineae Obenberger, 1958
- Vanroonia himalayana Obenberger, 1958
- Vanroonia indica (Obenberger, 1922)
- Vanroonia javana (Kerremans, 1898)
- Vanroonia luzonica Bellamy, 1991
- Vanroonia marmorea (Deyrolle, 1864)
- Vanroonia moultoni (Kerremans, 1912)
- Vanroonia papuana (Obenberger, 1922)
- Vanroonia perroti (Descarpentries & Villiers, 1967)
- Vanroonia pyropyga (Kerremans, 1903)
- Vanroonia sachtlebeni Obenberger, 1958
- Vanroonia spinipennis (Kerremans, 1900)
- Vanroonia strandi Obenberger, 1931
- Vanroonia vatineae (Baudon, 1965)
