= Dinocoroebus =

Scientific classification
- Kingdom: Animalia
- Phylum: Arthropoda
- Class: Insecta
- Order: Coleoptera
- Suborder: Polyphaga
- Infraorder: Elateriformia
- Family: Buprestidae
- Genus: Dinocoroebus; Obenberger, 1924

Genus of beetles

Dinocoroebus is a genus of beetles in the family Buprestidae, containing the following species:

- Dinocoroebus pertusicollis (Fairmaire, 1897)
- Dinocoroebus ugandae (Obenberger, 1922)
