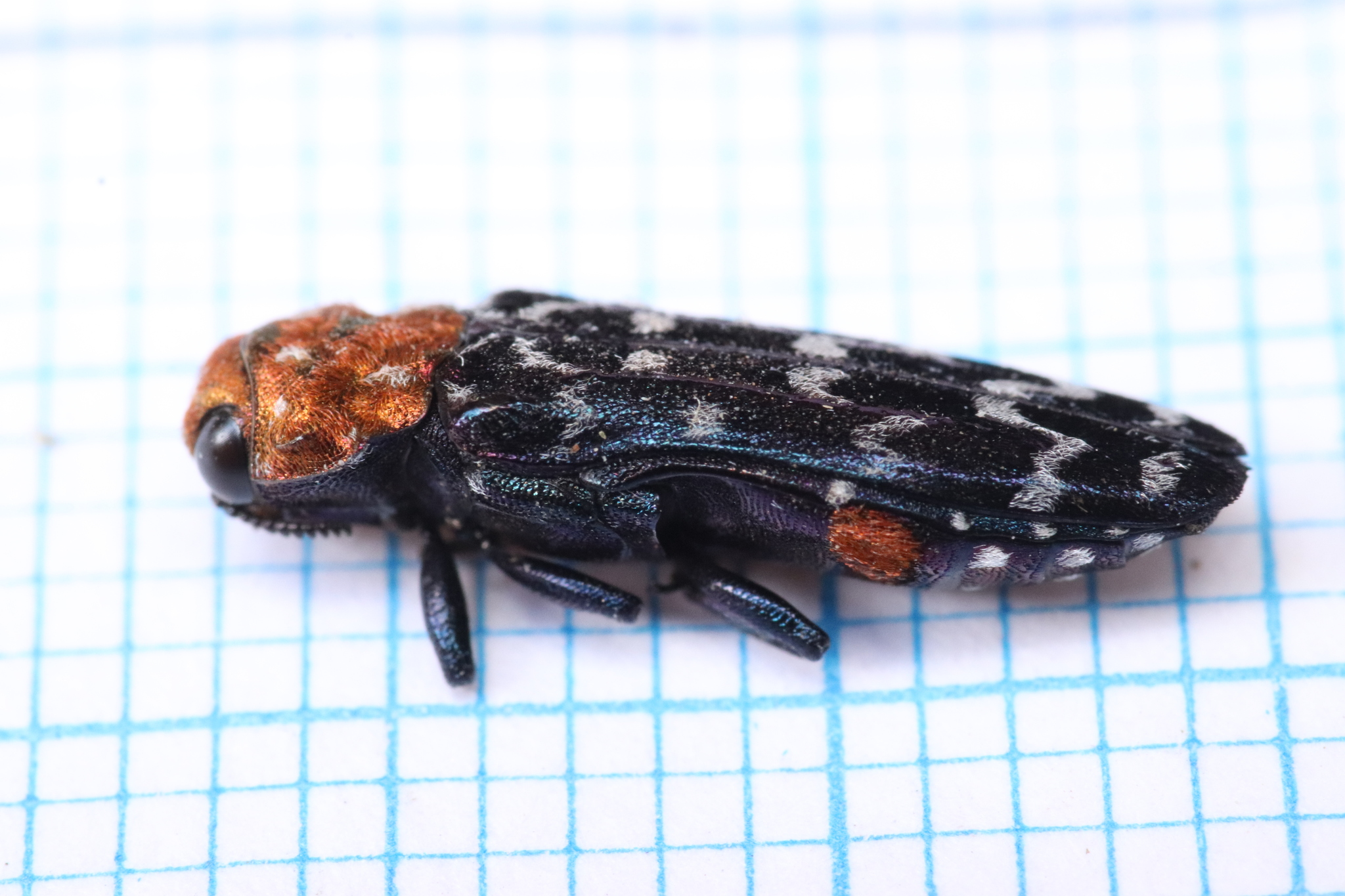
- Anaphlocteis pulchrus

Scientific classification
- Kingdom: Animalia
- Phylum: Arthropoda
- Class: Insecta
- Order: Coleoptera
- Suborder: Polyphaga
- Infraorder: Elateriformia
- Family: Buprestidae
- Genus: Anaphlocteis; Bellamy, 1986

= Anaphlocteis =

Genus of beetles

Anaphlocteis is a genus of beetles in the family Buprestidae, containing the following species:

- Anaphlocteis camerunicus Bellamy, 1986
- Anaphlocteis denticollis (Fahreus, 1851)
- Anaphlocteis dormitzeri (Obenberger, 1922)
- Anaphlocteis elongatus (Kerremans, 1900)
- Anaphlocteis orientalis Bellamy, 1986
- Anaphlocteis pulchrus (Obenberger, 1922)
- Anaphlocteis satanas (Obenberger, 1917)
- Anaphlocteis strandi (Obenberger, 1922)
- Anaphlocteis zanzibaricus (Kerremans, 1903)
