= Jaroslavia =

Jaroslavia ianthinipennis

Scientific classification
- Kingdom: Animalia
- Phylum: Arthropoda
- Class: Insecta
- Order: Coleoptera
- Suborder: Polyphaga
- Infraorder: Elateriformia
- Family: Buprestidae
- Genus: Jaroslavia; Obenberger, 1942
- Species: J. ianthinipennis

Binomial name
- Jaroslavia ianthinipennis Obenberger, 1942

Genus of beetles

Jaroslavia ianthinipennis is a species of beetles in the family Buprestidae, the only species in the genus Jaroslavia.
