= Heromorphus =

Heromorphus howanus

Scientific classification
- Kingdom: Animalia
- Phylum: Arthropoda
- Class: Insecta
- Order: Coleoptera
- Suborder: Polyphaga
- Infraorder: Elateriformia
- Family: Buprestidae
- Genus: Heromorphus; Obenberger, 1916
- Species: H. howanus

Binomial name
- Heromorphus howanus Obenberger, 1916

Genus of beetles

Heromorphus howanus is a species of beetles in the family Buprestidae, the only species in the genus Heromorphus.
