= Endelomorphus =

Endelomorphus biakensis

Scientific classification
- Kingdom: Animalia
- Phylum: Arthropoda
- Class: Insecta
- Order: Coleoptera
- Suborder: Polyphaga
- Infraorder: Elateriformia
- Family: Buprestidae
- Genus: Endelomorphus; Bily, 2007
- Species: E. biakensis

Binomial name
- Endelomorphus biakensis Bily, 2007

Genus of beetles

Endelomorphus biakensis is a species of beetles in the family Buprestidae, the only species in the genus Endelomorphus.
