= Strigulia =

Scientific classification
- Kingdom: Animalia
- Phylum: Arthropoda
- Class: Insecta
- Order: Coleoptera
- Suborder: Polyphaga
- Infraorder: Elateriformia
- Family: Buprestidae
- Genus: Strigulia; Kerremans, 1893

Genus of beetles

Strigulia is a genus of beetles in the family Buprestidae, containing the following species:

- Strigulia asmarica Bellamy, 1986
- Strigulia auberti Thery, 1930
- Strigulia boettcheri Thery, 1930
- Strigulia camerunica Obenberger, 1922
- Strigulia coerulea Kerremans, 1903
- Strigulia cyclodera (Fairmaire, 1891)
- Strigulia falcipes (Roth, 1851)
- Strigulia monardi Thery, 1947
- Strigulia nana Obenberger, 1924
- Strigulia nigritorum Kerremans, 1914
- Strigulia paradisea Obenberger, 1922
- Strigulia pygmaea Kerremans, 1899
- Strigulia scotti Thery, 1937
