= Antanambia =

Antanambia nigricans

Scientific classification
- Kingdom: Animalia
- Phylum: Arthropoda
- Class: Insecta
- Order: Coleoptera
- Suborder: Polyphaga
- Infraorder: Elateriformia
- Family: Buprestidae
- Genus: Antanambia; Descarpentries, 1975
- Species: A. nigricans

Binomial name
- Antanambia nigricans Descarpentries, 1975

Genus of beetles

Antanambia nigricans is a species of beetles in the family Buprestidae, the only species in the genus Antanambia.
