= Gigantocoraebus =

Gigantocoraebus lumbaris

Scientific classification
- Kingdom: Animalia
- Phylum: Arthropoda
- Class: Insecta
- Order: Coleoptera
- Suborder: Polyphaga
- Infraorder: Elateriformia
- Family: Buprestidae
- Genus: Gigantocoraebus; Obenberger, 1942
- Species: G. lumbaris

Binomial name
- Gigantocoraebus lumbaris (Klug, 1833)

Synonyms
- Gigantocoroebus Obenberger, 1942 (Missp.)

Genus of beetles

Gigantocoraebus lumbaris is a species of beetles in the family Buprestidae, the only species in the genus Gigantocoraebus.
