= Coraebastus =

Scientific classification
- Kingdom: Animalia
- Phylum: Arthropoda
- Class: Insecta
- Order: Coleoptera
- Suborder: Polyphaga
- Infraorder: Elateriformia
- Family: Buprestidae
- Genus: Coraebastus; Fairmaire, 1896

Genus of beetles

Coraebastus is a genus of beetles in the family Buprestidae, containing the following species:

- Coraebastus imperatrix (Obenberger, 1931)
- Coraebastus quinquepustulatus Fairmaire, 1896
