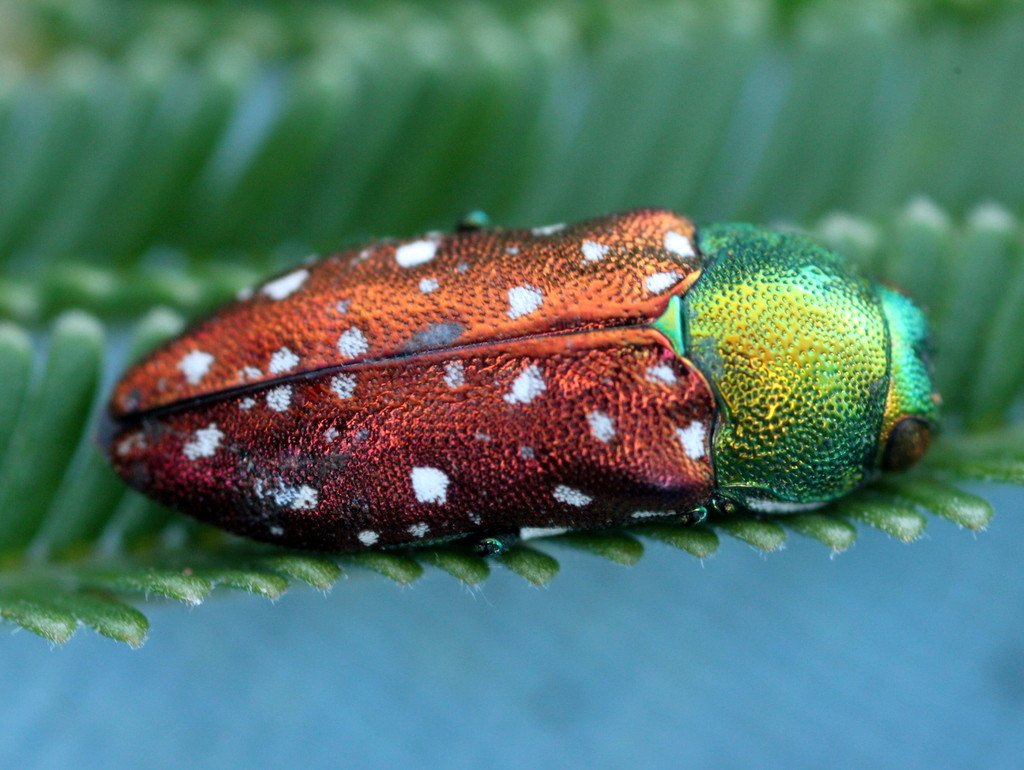

Scientific classification
- Kingdom: Animalia
- Phylum: Arthropoda
- Class: Insecta
- Order: Coleoptera
- Suborder: Polyphaga
- Infraorder: Elateriformia
- Family: Buprestidae
- Genus: Diphucrania; Dejean, 1833

Synonyms
- Cisseis Gory & Laporte, 1839; Ethon Gory & Laporte, 1839

= Diphucrania =

Genus of beetles

Diphucrania is a genus of beetles in the family Buprestidae.

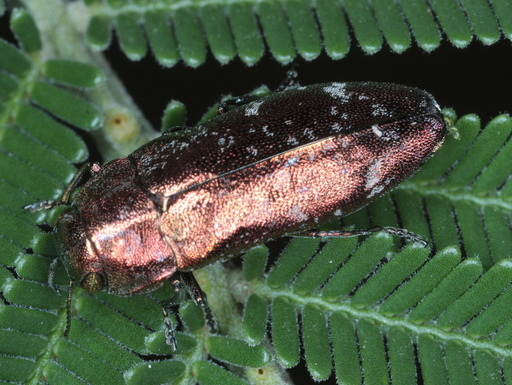
Diphucrania

== Species ==
- Diphucrania aberrans (Barker, 2001)
- Diphucrania acuducta (Kirby, 1837)
- Diphucrania adusta (Barker, 2001)
- Diphucrania aenea (Barker, 2007)
- Diphucrania aenigma (Barker, 2007)
- Diphucrania aeruginosa (Barker, 2007)
- Diphucrania albertisii (Gestro, 1877)
- Diphucrania albosparsa (Gory & Laporte, 1839)
- Diphucrania aquilonia (Bellamy, 1991)
- Diphucrania armstrongi (Barker, 2001)
- Diphucrania augustgoerlingi (Barker, 2001)
- Diphucrania aurocyanea (Carter, 1934)
- Diphucrania bedfordi (Obenberger, 1935)
- Diphucrania bilyi (Barker, 2007)
- Diphucrania borealis (Barker, 2007)
- Diphucrania brooksi (Barker, 2001)
- Diphucrania broomensis (Barker, 2001)
- Diphucrania browni (Carter, 1934)
- Diphucrania carterellus (Obenberger, 1934)
- Diphucrania carteri (Obenberger, 1924)
- Diphucrania chalcophora (Barker, 2001)
- Diphucrania chlorata (Barker, 2007)
- Diphucrania clermonti (Théry, 1945)
- Diphucrania corpulenta (Barker, 2001)
- Diphucrania cupreata (Barker, 2007)
- Diphucrania cupreicollis (Hope, 1846)
- Diphucrania cupreola (Barker, 2001)
- Diphucrania cupripennis (Guérin-Méneville, 1830)
- Diphucrania cyanea (Barker, 2001)
- Diphucrania cyaneopyga (Carter, 1923)
- Diphucrania cyanura (Kerremans, 1898)
- Diphucrania derbyensis (Barker, 2001)
- Diphucrania duodecimmaculata (Fabricius, 1801)
- Diphucrania elliptica (Carter, 1923)
- Diphucrania elongatula (Blackburn, 1888)
- Diphucrania ernestadamsi (Barker, 1999)
- Diphucrania erythrocephala (Barker, 2007)
- Diphucrania excelsior (Barker, 2001)
- Diphucrania fascigera (Obenberger, 1919)
- Diphucrania fraternus (Kerremans, 1900)
- Diphucrania fritilla (Barker, 2007)
- Diphucrania frontalis (Kerremans, 1898)
- Diphucrania fulgidicollis (Macleay, 1888)
- Diphucrania furfurosa (Barker, 2007)
- Diphucrania gibbera (Carter, 1937)
- Diphucrania goldingi (Barker, 2007)
- Diphucrania gouldii (Hope, 1846)
- Diphucrania guttata (Barker, 2007)
- Diphucrania heroni (Carter, 1934)
- Diphucrania impressicollis (Macleay, 1872)
- Diphucrania inops (Kerremans, 1898)
- Diphucrania kohouti (Barker, 2001)
- Diphucrania laticollis (Carter, 1923)
- Diphucrania leai (Barker, 2007)
- Diphucrania leucosticta (Kirby, 1818)
- Diphucrania macmillani (Barker, 2001)
- Diphucrania macqueeni (Barker, 2001)
- Diphucrania maculata (Gory & Laporte, 1839)
- Diphucrania marmorata (Gory & Laporte, 1839)
- Diphucrania minuta (Barker, 2007)
- Diphucrania minutissima (Thomson, 1879)
- Diphucrania miyama (Barker, 2007)
- Diphucrania modesta (Kerremans, 1898)
- Diphucrania montana (Barker, 2007)
- Diphucrania myallae (Carter, 1934)
- Diphucrania nigripennis (Macleay, 1888)
- Diphucrania nigrita (Kerremans, 1898)
- Diphucrania nigromaculata (Kerremans, 1895)
- Diphucrania nitidiventris (Carter, 1934)
- Diphucrania niveosparsa (Carter, 1927)
- Diphucrania notulata (Germar, 1848)
- Diphucrania nubeculosa (Germar, 1848)
- Diphucrania oblonga (Kerremans, 1903)
- Diphucrania obscura (Blackburn, 1887)
- Diphucrania opima (Thomson, 1879)
- Diphucrania ovalis (Carter, 1923)
- Diphucrania parva (Blackburn, 1887)
- Diphucrania patricia (Carter, 1935)
- Diphucrania pauperula (Kerremans, 1898)
- Diphucrania prasina (Carter, 1923)
- Diphucrania puella (Kerremans, 1898)
- Diphucrania pulchella (Carter, 1923)
- Diphucrania pulleni (Barker, 2001)
- Diphucrania regalis (Thomson, 1879)
- Diphucrania robertfisheri (Barker, 1999)
- Diphucrania roseocuprea (Hope, 1846)
- Diphucrania rubicunda (Kerremans, 1898)
- Diphucrania rubricata (Barker, 2007)
- Diphucrania rubriceps (Barker, 2007)
- Diphucrania scabiosa (Boisduval, 1835)
- Diphucrania scabrosula (Kerremans, 1898)
- Diphucrania semiobscura (Kerremans, 1898)
- Diphucrania sexnotata (Fauvel, 1891)
- Diphucrania speciosa (Barker, 2001)
- Diphucrania stellata (Barker, 2001)
- Diphucrania stigmata Gory & Laport, 1839
- Diphucrania storeyi (Barker, 2007)
- Diphucrania subbifascialis (Carter, 1927)
- Diphucrania suehasenpuschae (Barker, 2007)
- Diphucrania tasmanica (Kerremans, 1898)
- Diphucrania trimentula (Barker, 2001)
- Diphucrania tyleri (Barker, 2007)
- Diphucrania tyrrhena (Carter, 1923)
- Diphucrania ustulata (Barker, 2007)
- Diphucrania vicina (Kerremans, 1898)
- Diphucrania violacea (Kerremans, 1903)
- Diphucrania viridiceps (Kerremans, 1898)
- Diphucrania viridipurpurea (Carter, 1924)
- Diphucrania wagneri (Barker, 2007)
- Diphucrania watkinsi (Barker, 2001)
- Diphucrania westwoodii (Gory & Laporte, 1839)
- Diphucrania williamsi (Barker, 2007)
- Diphucrania wilsonensis (Barker, 2007)
