= Holmerika =

Scientific classification
- Kingdom: Animalia
- Phylum: Arthropoda
- Class: Insecta
- Order: Coleoptera
- Suborder: Polyphaga
- Infraorder: Elateriformia
- Family: Buprestidae
- Genus: Holmerika; Bellamy, 1988

Genus of beetles

Holmerika is a genus of beetles in the family Buprestidae, containing the following species:

- Holmerika mulanje Bellamy, 1988
- Holmerika orientalis Bellamy, 1988
