= Malagascoderes =

Scientific classification
- Kingdom: Animalia
- Phylum: Arthropoda
- Class: Insecta
- Order: Coleoptera
- Suborder: Polyphaga
- Infraorder: Elateriformia
- Family: Buprestidae
- Genus: Malagascoderes; Bellamy, 2006

Genus of beetles

Malagascoderes is a genus of beetles in the family Buprestidae, containing the following species:

- Malagascoderes goudotti (Thomson, 1878)
- Malagascoderes scriptus (Thery, 1937)
