= Niehuisia =

Scientific classification
- Kingdom: Animalia
- Phylum: Arthropoda
- Class: Insecta
- Order: Coleoptera
- Suborder: Polyphaga
- Infraorder: Elateriformia
- Family: Buprestidae
- Genus: Niehuisia; Curletti, 1995
- Species: N. maghrebica

Binomial name
- Niehuisia maghrebica Curletti, 1995

Genus of beetles

Niehuisia is a monotypic genus of beetles in the family Buprestidae, the jewel beetles. The sole species is Niehuisia maghrebica, which was first described in 1995.
