= Eulasiodora =

Scientific classification
- Kingdom: Animalia
- Phylum: Arthropoda
- Class: Insecta
- Order: Coleoptera
- Suborder: Polyphaga
- Infraorder: Elateriformia
- Family: Buprestidae
- Genus: Eulasiodora; Obenberger, 1924

Genus of beetles

Eulasiodora is a genus of beetles in the family Buprestidae, containing the following species:

- Eulasiodora singularis Obenberger, 1931
- Eulasiodora umtalina (Peringuey, 1908)
