= Angatra =

Scientific classification
- Kingdom: Animalia
- Phylum: Arthropoda
- Class: Insecta
- Order: Coleoptera
- Suborder: Polyphaga
- Infraorder: Elateriformia
- Family: Buprestidae
- Genus: Angatra; Descarpentries, 1969

Genus of beetles

Angatra is a genus of beetles in the family Buprestidae, containing the following species:

- Angatra magna Descarpentries, 1969
- Angatra parva Descarpentries, 1969
