= Camerunadora =

Camerunadora bifasciata

Scientific classification
- Kingdom: Animalia
- Phylum: Arthropoda
- Class: Insecta
- Order: Coleoptera
- Suborder: Polyphaga
- Infraorder: Elateriformia
- Family: Buprestidae
- Genus: Camerunadora; Bellamy, 2008
- Species: C. bifasciata

Binomial name
- Camerunadora bifasciata Bellamy, 2008

Genus of beetles

Camerunadora bifasciata is a species of beetle in the family Buprestidae, the only species in the genus Camerunadora.
