= Nastella =

Scientific classification
- Kingdom: Animalia
- Phylum: Arthropoda
- Class: Insecta
- Order: Coleoptera
- Suborder: Polyphaga
- Infraorder: Elateriformia
- Family: Buprestidae
- Genus: Nastella; Kerremans, 1903

Genus of beetles

Nastella is a genus of beetles in the family Buprestidae, containing the following species:

- Nastella chalcodes (Wiedemann, 1821)
- Nastella flammea Bellamy, 1989
- Nastella hessei (Obenberger, 1931)
- Nastella uniformis Obenberger, 1931
- Nastella virgo Obenberger, 1931
