= Pseudophlocteis =

Pseudophlocteis vidua

Scientific classification
- Kingdom: Animalia
- Phylum: Arthropoda
- Class: Insecta
- Order: Coleoptera
- Suborder: Polyphaga
- Infraorder: Elateriformia
- Family: Buprestidae
- Genus: Pseudophlocteis; Bellamy, 1986
- Species: P. vidua

Binomial name
- Pseudophlocteis vidua (Fahraeus, 1851)

Genus of beetles

Pseudophlocteis vidua is a species of beetles in the family Buprestidae, the only species in the genus Pseudophlocteis.
