= Phlocteis =

Scientific classification
- Kingdom: Animalia
- Phylum: Arthropoda
- Class: Insecta
- Order: Coleoptera
- Suborder: Polyphaga
- Infraorder: Elateriformia
- Family: Buprestidae
- Genus: Phlocteis; Kerremans, 1893

Genus of beetles

Phlocteis is a genus of beetles in the family Buprestidae, containing the following species:

- Phlocteis cyaniventris Kerremans, 1898
- Phlocteis exasperata (Swartz, 1817)
- Phlocteis hova Thery, 1937
- Phlocteis humeralis (Waterhouse, 1887)
- Phlocteis quadricornis (Fairmaire, 1892)
