= Anthaxomorphus =

Scientific classification
- Kingdom: Animalia
- Phylum: Arthropoda
- Class: Insecta
- Order: Coleoptera
- Suborder: Polyphaga
- Infraorder: Elateriformia
- Family: Buprestidae
- Tribe: Aphanisticini
- Subtribe: Anthaxomorphina
- Genus: Anthaxomorphus; Deyrolle, 1864

Synonyms
- Bolivarina Obenberger, 1922

Genus of beetles

Anthaxomorphus is a genus of metallic wood-boring beetles in the family Buprestidae. There are about 25 described species in Anthaxomorphus, found in Africa, Australia, and east Asia.

== Species ==
These 25 species belong to the genus Anthaxomorphus:

- Anthaxomorphus aethiopicus Obenberger, 1924
- Anthaxomorphus africanus Obenberger, 1922
- Anthaxomorphus bellamyi Kalashian, 1993
- Anthaxomorphus bourgainvillensis Williams & Weir, 1992
- Anthaxomorphus burgeoni Thery, 1930
- Anthaxomorphus coeruleus Thery, 1930
- Anthaxomorphus collarti Thery, 1930
- Anthaxomorphus coomani Thery, 1943
- Anthaxomorphus corporaali Obenberger, 1924
- Anthaxomorphus cossyphoides Thery, 1947
- Anthaxomorphus femoralis Deyrolle, 1864
- Anthaxomorphus granulosus Deyrolle, 1864
- Anthaxomorphus hargreavesi Thery, 1933
- Anthaxomorphus lacustris Obenberger, 1924
- Anthaxomorphus maindroni Thery, 1943
- Anthaxomorphus oblongus Deyrolle, 1864
- Anthaxomorphus occidentalis Obenberger, 1924
- Anthaxomorphus papuanus Deyrolle, 1864
- Anthaxomorphus paracoeruleus Bellamy, 1987
- Anthaxomorphus paradoxa (Obenberger, 1921)
- Anthaxomorphus philippinensis Fisher, 1921
- Anthaxomorphus queenslandicus Williams & Weir, 1992
- Anthaxomorphus raffrayi Thery, 1930
- Anthaxomorphus roseocupreus Bellamy, 1987
- Anthaxomorphus turneri Thery, 1930
