= Anadora =

Scientific classification
- Kingdom: Animalia
- Phylum: Arthropoda
- Class: Insecta
- Order: Coleoptera
- Suborder: Polyphaga
- Infraorder: Elateriformia
- Family: Buprestidae
- Genus: Anadora; Kerremans, 1898

Genus of beetles

Anadora is a genus of beetles in the family Buprestidae, containing the following species:

- Anadora cupriventris Obenberger, 1922
- Anadora mechowi (Quedenfeldt, 1886)
- Anadora margotana Novak, 2010
- Anadora occidentalis Bellamy, 1986
- Anadora pavo (Gestro, 1881)
- Anadora rivularis Obenberger, 1924
- Anadora silvatica Bellamy, 1986
