= Paranastella =

Scientific classification
- Kingdom: Animalia
- Phylum: Arthropoda
- Class: Insecta
- Order: Coleoptera
- Suborder: Polyphaga
- Infraorder: Elateriformia
- Family: Buprestidae
- Genus: Paranastella; Obenberger, 1931

Genus of beetles

Paranastella is a genus of beetles in the family Buprestidae, containing the following species:

- Paranastella strandi Obenberger, 1931
- Paranastella villiersi Descarpentries, 1984
- Paranastella viridis Bellamy, 2006
