= Cyphothroax =

Scientific classification
- Kingdom: Animalia
- Phylum: Arthropoda
- Class: Insecta
- Order: Coleoptera
- Suborder: Polyphaga
- Infraorder: Elateriformia
- Family: Buprestidae
- Genus: Cyphothroax; Waterhouse, 1887

Genus of beetles

Cyphothroax is a genus of beetles in the family Buprestidae, containing the following species:

- Cyphothroax gibber (Gory, 1841)
- Cyphothroax gibbicollis (Kerremans, 1897)
- Cyphothroax mexicanus Bellamy, 1997
- Cyphothroax oaxacensis Bellamy, 1997
- Cyphothroax palleolatus (Chevrolat, 1835)
- Cyphothroax yucatanensis Bellamy, 1997
