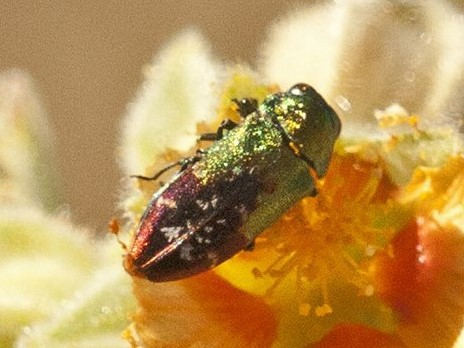
- Neospades chrysopygia

Scientific classification
- Kingdom: Animalia
- Phylum: Arthropoda
- Class: Insecta
- Order: Coleoptera
- Suborder: Polyphaga
- Infraorder: Elateriformia
- Family: Buprestidae
- Genus: Neospades; Blackburn, 1887

Species
- 11

= Neospades =

Genus of beetles

Neospades is a genus of beetles in the family Buprestidae, the jewel beetles. There are 11 species, all native to Australia.

Species include:

- Neospades chrysopygius (Germer, 1848)
- Neospades cruciatus (Fabricius, 1775)
- Neospades cupricaudus Carter, 1927
- Neospades cupriferus (Gestro, 1877)
- Neospades lateralis Blackburn, 1888
- Neospades nigroaeneus (Kerremans, 1898)
- Neospades pictus Carter, 1923
- Neospades rugiceps (Thomson, 1879)
- Neospades simplex Blackburn, 1888
- Neospades terrareginae (Obenberger, 1919)
- Neospades viridis (Kerremans, 1898)
