= Paradora =

Scientific classification
- Kingdom: Animalia
- Phylum: Arthropoda
- Class: Insecta
- Order: Coleoptera
- Suborder: Polyphaga
- Infraorder: Elateriformia
- Family: Buprestidae
- Genus: Paradora; Kerremans, 1900

Genus of beetles

Paradora is a genus of beetles in the family Buprestidae, containing the following species:

- Paradora corinthia (Fairmaire, 1901)
- Paradora impetiginosa (Gory, 1841)
- Paradora pumicata (Klug, 1833)
- Paradora saxosicollis (Fairmaire, 1897)
- Paradora zonata (Kerremans, 1899)
