= Euchroaria =

Scientific classification
- Kingdom: Animalia
- Phylum: Arthropoda
- Class: Insecta
- Order: Coleoptera
- Suborder: Polyphaga
- Infraorder: Elateriformia
- Family: Buprestidae
- Genus: Euchroaria; Obenberger, 1924

Genus of beetles

Euchroaria is a genus of beetles in the family Buprestidae, containing the following species:

- Euchroaria coraeboides Obenberger, 1924
- Euchroaria subcornuta (Fairmaire, 1891)
