= Sambirania =

Scientific classification
- Kingdom: Animalia
- Phylum: Arthropoda
- Class: Insecta
- Order: Coleoptera
- Suborder: Polyphaga
- Infraorder: Elateriformia
- Family: Buprestidae
- Genus: Sambirania; Obenberger, 1942

Genus of beetles

Sambirania is a genus of beetles in the family Buprestidae, containing the following species:

- Sambirania aeneicollis Descarpentries, 1968
- Sambirania brachysoma Obenberger, 1942
- Sambirania dubia Descarpentries, 1968
- Sambirania impedita Descarpentries, 1968
- Sambirania incerta Descarpentries, 1968
- Sambirania inflata Descarpentries, 1968
- Sambirania plagicollis Descarpentries, 1968
- Sambirania rotundipennis Descarpentries, 1968
- Sambirania suspecta Descarpentries, 1968
