= Mandritsaria =

Scientific classification
- Kingdom: Animalia
- Phylum: Arthropoda
- Class: Insecta
- Order: Coleoptera
- Suborder: Polyphaga
- Infraorder: Elateriformia
- Family: Buprestidae
- Genus: Mandritsaria; Obenberger, 1942

Genus of beetles

Mandritsaria is a genus of beetles in the family Buprestidae, containing the following species:

- Mandritsaria ambositrensis Descarpentries, 1968
- Mandritsaria antamponensis Descarpentries, 1968
- Mandritsaria catalai Descarpentries, 1968
- Mandritsaria inaequalis (Gory & Laporte, 1839)
- Mandritsaria payrierasi Descarpentries, 1968
- Mandritsaria sicardi Descarpentries, 1968
- Mandritsaria vadoni Descarpentries, 1968
