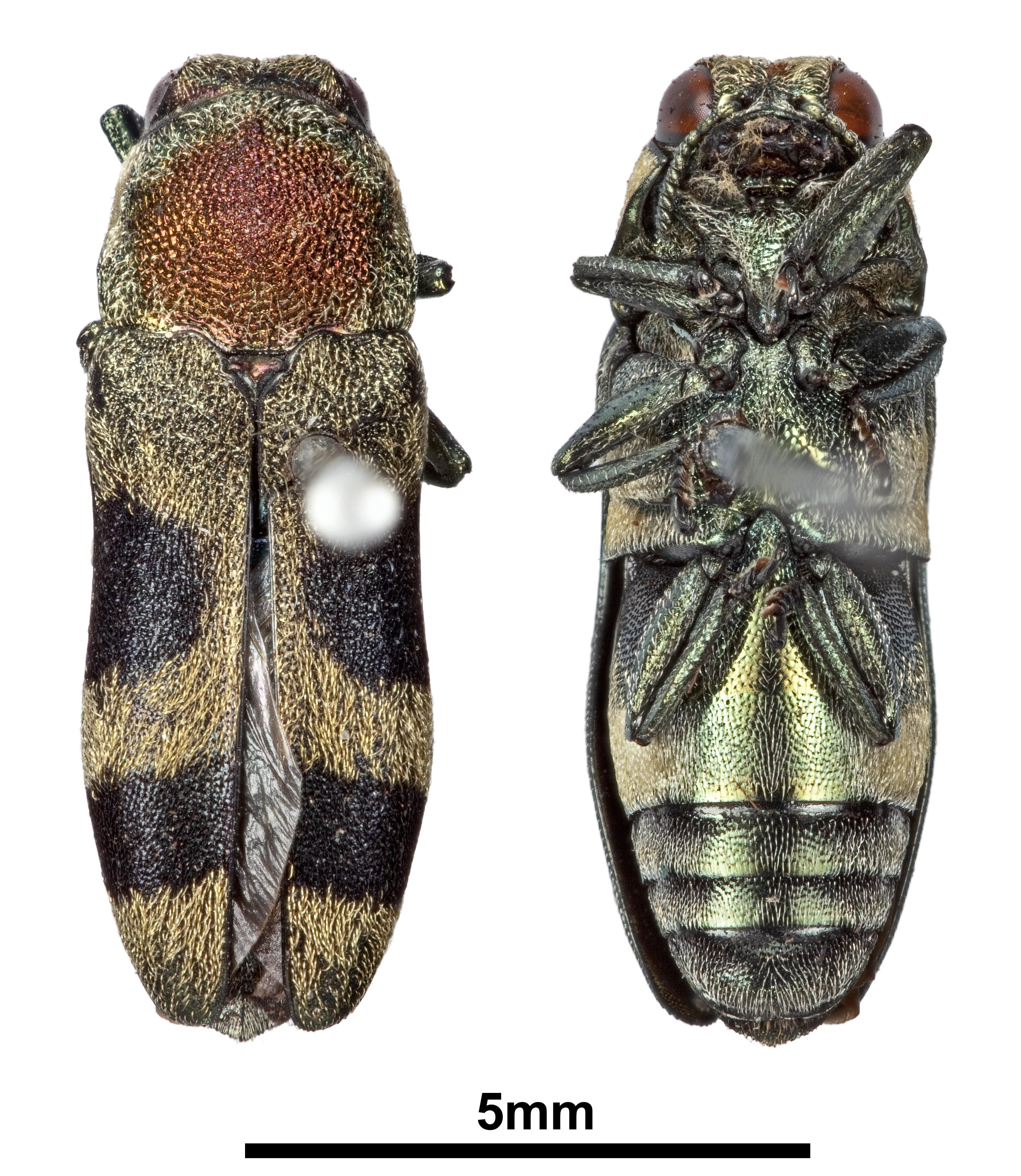
- Tonkinula aurofasciata

Scientific classification
- Kingdom: Animalia
- Phylum: Arthropoda
- Class: Insecta
- Order: Coleoptera
- Suborder: Polyphaga
- Infraorder: Elateriformia
- Family: Buprestidae
- Genus: Tonkinula; Obenberger, 1923
- Species: T. aurofasciata

Binomial name
- Tonkinula aurofasciata (Saunders, 1866)

= Tonkinula =

Tonkinula aurofasciata

Genus of beetles

Tonkinula aurofasciata is a species of beetles in the family Buprestidae, the only species in the genus Tonkinula.
