= Kamosiella =

Scientific classification
- Kingdom: Animalia
- Phylum: Arthropoda
- Class: Insecta
- Order: Coleoptera
- Suborder: Polyphaga
- Infraorder: Elateriformia
- Family: Buprestidae
- Genus: Kamosiella; Bellamy, 1988

Genus of beetles

Kamosiella is a genus of beetles in the family Buprestidae, containing the following species:

- Kamosiella dermestoides (Thomson, 1878)
- Kamosiella jactuosula (Peringuey, 1908)
