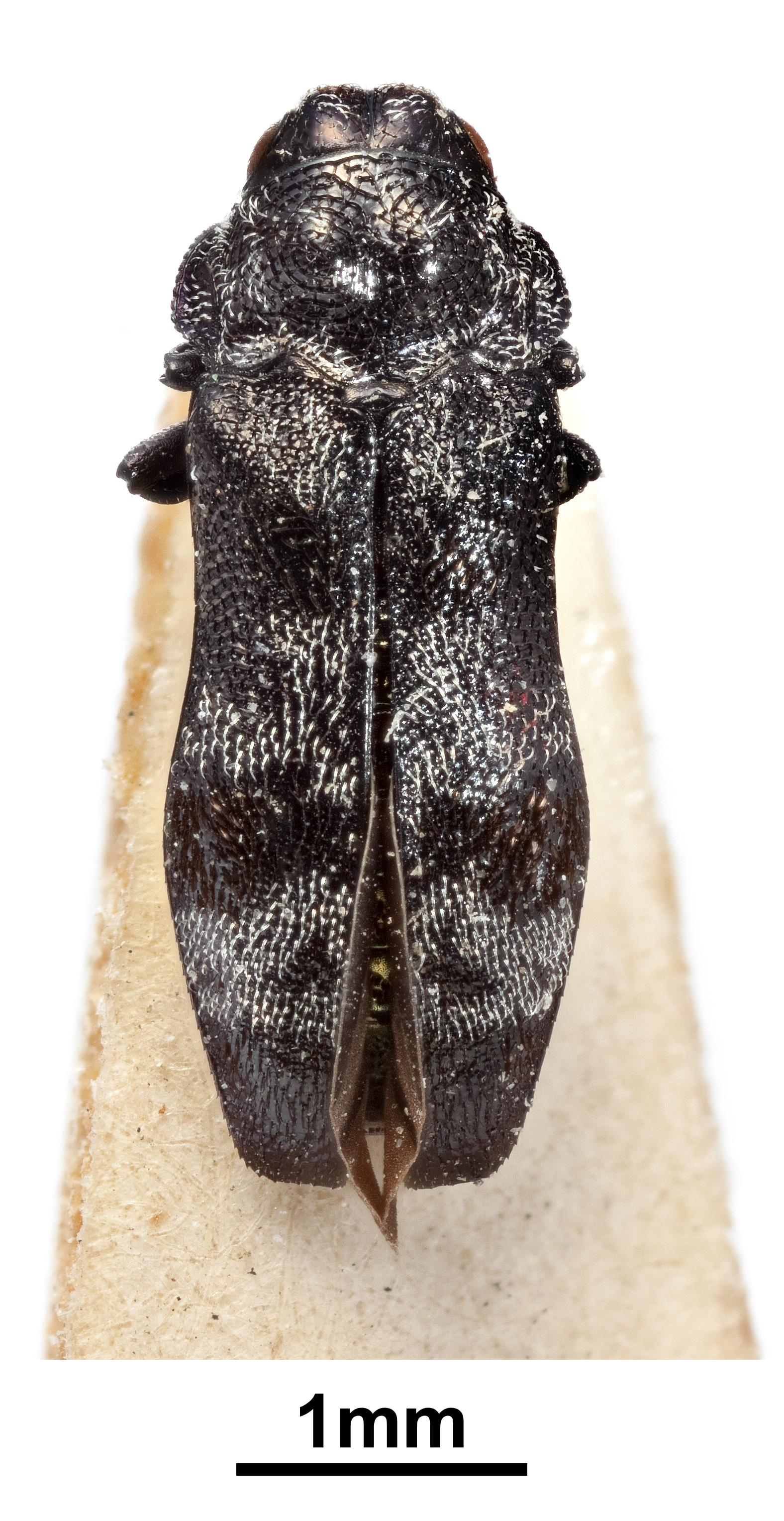
- Metasambus weyersi

Scientific classification
- Kingdom: Animalia
- Phylum: Arthropoda
- Class: Insecta
- Order: Coleoptera
- Suborder: Polyphaga
- Infraorder: Elateriformia
- Family: Buprestidae
- Genus: Metasambus; Kerremans, 1903

= Metasambus =

Genus of beetles

Metasambus is a genus of beetles in the family Buprestidae, containing the following species:

- Metasambus hoscheki (Obenberger, 1916)
- Metasambus tonkinensis Descarpentries & Villiers, 1966
- Metasambus weyersi (Kerremans, 1900)
