= Lepidoclema =

Scientific classification
- Kingdom: Animalia
- Phylum: Arthropoda
- Class: Insecta
- Order: Coleoptera
- Suborder: Polyphaga
- Infraorder: Elateriformia
- Family: Buprestidae
- Genus: Lepidoclema; Bellamy & Holm, 1985

Genus of beetles

Lepidoclema is a genus of beetles in the family Buprestidae, containing the following species:

- Lepidoclema magnum Bellamy & Holm, 1985
- Lepidoclema parvum Bellamy & Holm, 1985
