= Lumawigia =

Scientific classification
- Kingdom: Animalia
- Phylum: Arthropoda
- Class: Insecta
- Order: Coleoptera
- Suborder: Polyphaga
- Infraorder: Elateriformia
- Family: Buprestidae
- Genus: Lumawigia; Bellamy, 2005

Genus of beetles

Lumawigia is a genus of beetles in the family Buprestidae, the jewel beetles. They are native to the Philippines.

The genus was erected in 2005 with the description of the new species L. gibbicephala. A second species, L. leytensis, was described in 2009.

Species include:

- Lumawigia gibbicephala Bellamy, 2005
- Lumawigia leytensis Bellamy & Ohmomo, 2009
