= Neefioides =

Neefioides rufobasalis

Scientific classification
- Kingdom: Animalia
- Phylum: Arthropoda
- Class: Insecta
- Order: Coleoptera
- Suborder: Polyphaga
- Infraorder: Elateriformia
- Family: Buprestidae
- Genus: Neefioides; Bellamy, 2003
- Species: N. rufobasalis

Binomial name
- Neefioides rufobasalis (Fairmaire, 1897)

Synonyms
- Cisseis rufobasalis

Genus of beetles

Neefioides rufobasalis is a species of beetles in the family Buprestidae, the jewel beetles. Formerly known as Cisseis rufobasalis, it was transferred to a new monotypic genus of its own, Neefioides, in 2003. This beetle is native to Madagascar.
