= Capitijubatus =

Scientific classification
- Kingdom: Animalia
- Phylum: Arthropoda
- Class: Insecta
- Order: Coleoptera
- Suborder: Polyphaga
- Infraorder: Elateriformia
- Family: Buprestidae
- Genus: Capitijubatus; Bellamy, 1986

Genus of beetles

Capitijubatus is a genus of beetles in the family Buprestidae, containing the following species:

- Capitijubatus natalicus (Peringuey, 1908)
- Capitijubatus nickerli (Obenberger, 1922)
