= Evimantius =

Scientific classification
- Kingdom: Animalia
- Phylum: Arthropoda
- Class: Insecta
- Order: Coleoptera
- Suborder: Polyphaga
- Infraorder: Elateriformia
- Family: Buprestidae
- Genus: Evimantius; Kerremans, 1891

Genus of beetles

Evimantius is a genus of beetles in the family Buprestidae, containing the following species:

- Evimantius curvicollis Kerremans, 1891
- Evimantius rufopictus Deyrolle, 1864
