= Bourgoinia =

Scientific classification
- Kingdom: Animalia
- Phylum: Arthropoda
- Class: Insecta
- Order: Coleoptera
- Suborder: Polyphaga
- Infraorder: Elateriformia
- Family: Buprestidae
- Genus: Bourgoinia; Obenberger, 1926

Genus of beetles

Bourgoinia is a genus of beetles in the family Buprestidae, containing the following species:

- Bourgoinia achardi Obenberger, 1926
- Bourgoinia murzini Kalashian, 1993
- Bourgoinia obscurivirida Bellamy, 1990
