= Discoderopsis =

Discoderopsis nigrovirens

Scientific classification
- Kingdom: Animalia
- Phylum: Arthropoda
- Class: Insecta
- Order: Coleoptera
- Suborder: Polyphaga
- Infraorder: Elateriformia
- Family: Buprestidae
- Genus: Discoderopsis; Thery, 1930
- Species: D. nigrovirens

Binomial name
- Discoderopsis nigrovirens (Fairmaire, 1899)

Genus of beetles

Discoderopsis nigrovirens is a species of beetles in the family Buprestidae, the only species in the genus Discoderopsis.
