= Geralius =

Scientific classification
- Kingdom: Animalia
- Phylum: Arthropoda
- Class: Insecta
- Order: Coleoptera
- Suborder: Polyphaga
- Infraorder: Elateriformia
- Family: Buprestidae
- Genus: Geralius; Harold, 1869

Genus of beetles

Geralius is a genus of beetles in the family Buprestidae, containing the following species:

- Geralius furciventris (Chevrolat, 1838)
- Geralius inermis Cobos, 1988
