= Germarica =

Scientific classification
- Kingdom: Animalia
- Phylum: Arthropoda
- Class: Insecta
- Order: Coleoptera
- Suborder: Polyphaga
- Infraorder: Elateriformia
- Family: Buprestidae
- Tribe: Aphanisticini
- Subtribe: Anthaxomorphina
- Genus: Germarica; Blackburn, 1888

Genus of beetles

Germarica is a genus of metallic wood-boring beetles in the family Buprestidae. There are at least three described species in Germarica, found in Australia.

== Species ==
These three species belong to the genus Germarica:

- Germarica blackburni Obenberger, 1923
- Germarica carteri Obenberger, 1923
- Germarica lilliputana (Thomson, 1879)

Note on the date: Although Blackburn's paper was "read" on 4 October, 1887, the journal in which the paper was contained was not published until 1888. The authority should therefore properly be "Blackburn 1888", as listed in Nomenclator Zoologicus.
