= Eurynodes =

Eurynodes coelestis

Scientific classification
- Kingdom: Animalia
- Phylum: Arthropoda
- Class: Insecta
- Order: Coleoptera
- Suborder: Polyphaga
- Infraorder: Elateriformia
- Family: Buprestidae
- Genus: Eurynodes; Thery, 1934
- Species: E. coelestis

Binomial name
- Eurynodes coelestis (Kerremans, 1897)

Genus of beetles

Eurynodes coelestis is a species of beetles in the family Buprestidae, the only species in the genus Eurynodes.
