= Duncanius =

Scientific classification
- Kingdom: Animalia
- Phylum: Arthropoda
- Class: Insecta
- Order: Coleoptera
- Suborder: Polyphaga
- Infraorder: Elateriformia
- Family: Buprestidae
- Genus: Duncanius; Bellamy, 2008

Genus of beetles

Duncanius is a genus of beetles in the family Buprestidae, containing the following species:

- Duncanius australis (Thery, 1954)
- Duncanius capeneri (Cobos, 1953)
- Duncanius capitatus (Kerremans, 1914)
- Duncanius collarti (Thery, 1954)
- Duncanius cylinderus (Kerremans, 1914)
- Duncanius dolatus (Kerremans, 1914)
- Duncanius filiformis (Thery, 1948)
- Duncanius fuellerborni (Thery, 1954)
- Duncanius kerresmani (Thery, 1954)
- Duncanius lineolus (Obenberger, 1928)
- Duncanius malefidus (Thery, 1954)
- Duncanius parallelithorax (Cobos, 1953)
- Duncanius parvulus (Fahraeus, 1851)
- Duncanius schroederi (Thery, 1954)
- Duncanius transversus (Kerremans, 1903)
- Duncanius trapezicollis (Cobos, 1960)
- Duncanius varii (Cobos, 1960)
