= Meliacanthus =

Meliacanthus cupreomarginatus

Scientific classification
- Kingdom: Animalia
- Phylum: Arthropoda
- Class: Insecta
- Order: Coleoptera
- Suborder: Polyphaga
- Infraorder: Elateriformia
- Family: Buprestidae
- Genus: Meliacanthus; Thery, 1942
- Species: M. cupreomarginatus

Binomial name
- Meliacanthus cupreomarginatus (Saunders, 1866)

Genus of beetles

Meliacanthus cupreomarginatus is a species of beetle in the family Buprestidae, the only species in the genus Meliacanthus.
