= Afrocylindromorphus =

Afrocylindromorphus platysomus

Scientific classification
- Kingdom: Animalia
- Phylum: Arthropoda
- Clade: Pancrustacea
- Class: Insecta
- Order: Coleoptera
- Suborder: Polyphaga
- Infraorder: Elateriformia
- Family: Buprestidae
- Genus: Afrocylindromorphus; Bily & Bellamy, 1998
- Species: A. platysomus

Binomial name
- Afrocylindromorphus platysomus Bily & Bellamy, 1998

Genus of beetles

Afrocylindromorphus is a genus of Elateriform beetles that belongs to the family Buprestidae (Jewel beetles). The only species this genus contains is Afrocylindromorphus platysomus.
