= Cryptomorpha =

Cryptomorpha dentifera

Scientific classification
- Kingdom: Animalia
- Phylum: Arthropoda
- Class: Insecta
- Order: Coleoptera
- Suborder: Polyphaga
- Infraorder: Elateriformia
- Family: Buprestidae
- Genus: Cryptomorpha; Bellamy, 1988
- Species: C. dentifera

Binomial name
- Cryptomorpha dentifera (Waterhouse, 1902)

Genus of beetles

Cryptomorpha dentifera is a species of beetles in the family Buprestidae, the only species in the genus Cryptomorpha.
