= Diadorina =

Diadorina golbachi

Scientific classification
- Kingdom: Animalia
- Phylum: Arthropoda
- Class: Insecta
- Order: Coleoptera
- Suborder: Polyphaga
- Infraorder: Elateriformia
- Family: Buprestidae
- Genus: Diadorina; Cobos, 1974
- Species: D. golbachi

Binomial name
- Diadorina golbachi Cobos, 1974

Genus of beetles

Diadorina golbachi is a species of beetles in the family Buprestidae, the only species in the genus Diadorina.
