= Midongya =

Midongya mirabilis

Scientific classification
- Kingdom: Animalia
- Phylum: Arthropoda
- Class: Insecta
- Order: Coleoptera
- Suborder: Polyphaga
- Infraorder: Elateriformia
- Family: Buprestidae
- Genus: Midongya; Obenberger, 1942
- Species: M. mirabilis

Binomial name
- Midongya mirabilis Obenberger, 1942

Genus of beetles

Midongya mirabilis is a species of beetles in the family Buprestidae, the only species in the genus Midongya.
