= Indiadactylus =

Scientific classification
- Kingdom: Animalia
- Phylum: Arthropoda
- Class: Insecta
- Order: Coleoptera
- Suborder: Polyphaga
- Infraorder: Elateriformia
- Family: Buprestidae
- Genus: Indiadactylus; Bellamy, 1992

Genus of beetles

Indiadactylus is a genus of beetles in the family Buprestidae, containing the following species:

- Indiadactylus chinensis (Obenberger, 1924)
- Indiadactylus indicus (Obenberger, 1924)
- Indiadactylus nigricans (Kerremans, 1890)
- Indiadactylus pulchellus (Gory & Laporte, 1839)
