= Peyrierasina =

Peyrierasina complanata

Scientific classification
- Kingdom: Animalia
- Phylum: Arthropoda
- Class: Insecta
- Order: Coleoptera
- Suborder: Polyphaga
- Infraorder: Elateriformia
- Family: Buprestidae
- Genus: Peyrierasina; Descarpentries, 1975
- Species: P. complanata

Binomial name
- Peyrierasina complanata Descarpentries, 1975

Genus of beetles

Peyrierasina complanata is a species of beetles in the family Buprestidae, the only species in the genus Peyrierasina.
