= Pseudokerremansia =

Scientific classification
- Kingdom: Animalia
- Phylum: Arthropoda
- Class: Insecta
- Order: Coleoptera
- Suborder: Polyphaga
- Infraorder: Elateriformia
- Family: Buprestidae
- Subtribe: Toxoscelina
- Genus: Pseudokerremansia; Bellamy & Holm, 1985

Type species
- Kerremansia arcuala Péringuey, 1908

Genus of beetles

Pseudokerremansia is a genus of beetles in the family Buprestidae, the jewel beetles. They are native to Africa.

Species include:

- Pseudokerremansia arcuata (Peringuey, 1908)
- Pseudokerremansia zuluensis Bellamy, 2008
