= Borneoscelus =

Borneoscelus variegatus

Scientific classification
- Kingdom: Animalia
- Phylum: Arthropoda
- Class: Insecta
- Order: Coleoptera
- Suborder: Polyphaga
- Infraorder: Elateriformia
- Family: Buprestidae
- Genus: Borneoscelus; Bellamy, 1995
- Species: B. variegatus

Binomial name
- Borneoscelus variegatus Bellamy, 1995

Genus of beetles

Borneoscelus variegatus is a species of beetles in the family Buprestidae, the only species in the genus Borneoscelus.
