= Sambomorpha =

Scientific classification
- Kingdom: Animalia
- Phylum: Arthropoda
- Class: Insecta
- Order: Coleoptera
- Suborder: Polyphaga
- Infraorder: Elateriformia
- Family: Buprestidae
- Genus: Sambomorpha; Obenberger, 1924

Species
- 12

Genus of beetles

Sambomorpha is a genus of beetles in the family Buprestidae, the jewel beetles. They are native to the Americas from Mexico to Brazil and Argentina.

These beetles are mostly black in color, but some species have purplish or blue casts.

Species include:

- Sambomorpha aeneifrons (Kerremans, 1896)
- Sambomorpha argentiniensis Cobos, 1959
- Sambomorpha blairi Obenberger, 1940
- Sambomorpha catharinae Obenberger, 1924
- Sambomorpha chiapas Bellamy, 1997
- Sambomorpha clarki Hespenheide, 1990
- Sambomorpha corona Bellamy, 2007
- Sambomorpha costarica Bellamy, 1997
- Sambomorpha occidentalis Bellamy, 1997
- Sambomorpha panama Bellamy, 2007
- Sambomorpha quintana Bellamy, 1997
- Sambomorpha vicina Obenberger, 1940
