= Pseudocoraebus =

Scientific classification
- Kingdom: Animalia
- Phylum: Arthropoda
- Class: Insecta
- Order: Coleoptera
- Suborder: Polyphaga
- Infraorder: Elateriformia
- Family: Buprestidae
- Genus: Pseudocoraebus; Thery, 1905

Genus of beetles

Pseudocoraebus is a genus of beetles in the family Buprestidae, containing the following species:

- Pseudocoraebus mocquerysi Thery, 1905
- Pseudocoraebus strandi Obenberger, 1931
