= Helferia =

Helferia strandi

Scientific classification
- Kingdom: Animalia
- Phylum: Arthropoda
- Class: Insecta
- Order: Coleoptera
- Suborder: Polyphaga
- Infraorder: Elateriformia
- Family: Buprestidae
- Genus: Helferia; Obenberger, 1932
- Species: H. strandi

Binomial name
- Helferia strandi Obenberger, 1932

Genus of beetles

Helferia strandi is a species of beetles in the family Buprestidae, the only species in the genus Helferia.
