= Therybuprestis =

Therybuprestis crassa

Scientific classification
- Kingdom: Animalia
- Phylum: Arthropoda
- Class: Insecta
- Order: Coleoptera
- Suborder: Polyphaga
- Infraorder: Elateriformia
- Family: Buprestidae
- Genus: Therybuprestis; Strand, 1932
- Species: T. crassa

Binomial name
- Therybuprestis crassa (Thery, 1930)

Genus of beetles

Therybuprestis crassa is a species of beetles in the family Buprestidae, the only species in the genus Therybuprestis.
