= Hypocisseis =

Scientific classification
- Kingdom: Animalia
- Phylum: Arthropoda
- Class: Insecta
- Order: Coleoptera
- Suborder: Polyphaga
- Infraorder: Elateriformia
- Family: Buprestidae
- Genus: Hypocisseis; Thomson, 1879

Genus of beetles

Hypocisseis is a genus of beetles in the family Buprestidae, containing the following species:

- Hypocisseis auriceps (Deyrolle, 1864)
- Hypocisseis blackburni (Obenberger, 1924)
- Hypocisseis brachyformis (Deyrolle, 1864)
- Hypocisseis carteri (Obenberger, 1924)
- Hypocisseis cyanura (Kerremans, 1898)
- Hypocisseis latipennis (Macleay, 1872)
- Hypocisseis madari (Obenberger, 1924)
- Hypocisseis nigrosericea (Obenberger, 1924)
- Hypocisseis obesa (Kerremans, 1900)
- Hypocisseis ornata Carter, 1923
- Hypocisseis papuana (Oberberger, 1924)
- Hypocisseis philippinensis Bellamy, 1991
- Hypocisseis pilosicollis (Blackburn, 1891)
- Hypocisseis suturalis (Saunders, 1868)
