= Seyrigia (beetle) =

Seyrigia albopunctata

Scientific classification
- Kingdom: Animalia
- Phylum: Arthropoda
- Class: Insecta
- Order: Coleoptera
- Suborder: Polyphaga
- Infraorder: Elateriformia
- Family: Buprestidae
- Genus: Seyrigia; Thery, 1937
- Species: S. albopunctata

Binomial name
- Seyrigia albopunctata Thery, 1937

Genus of beetles

Seyrigia albopunctata is a species of beetle in the family Buprestidae, the only species in the genus Seyrigia.
