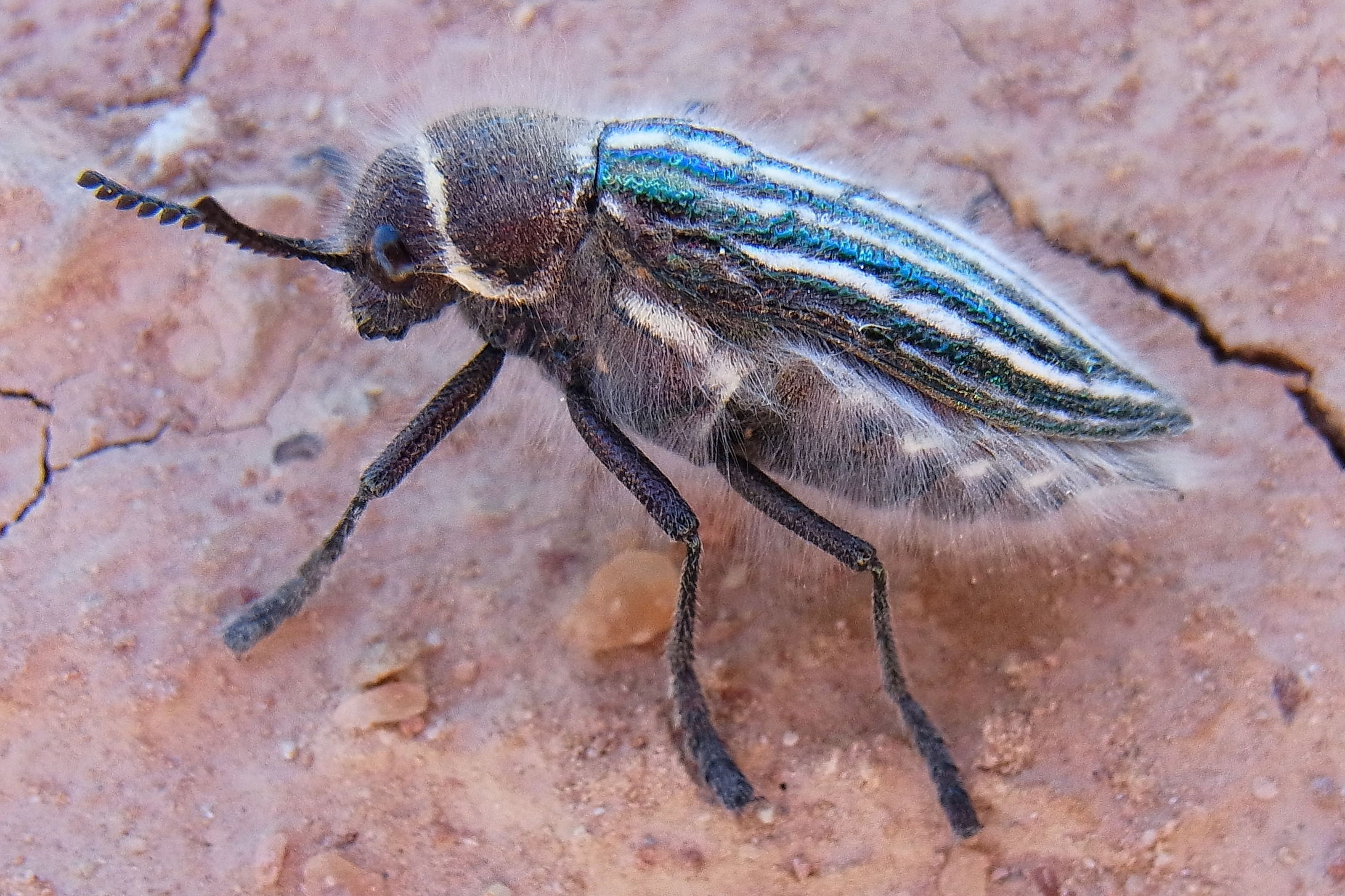
- Julodis onopordi

Scientific classification
- Domain: Eukaryota
- Kingdom: Animalia
- Phylum: Arthropoda
- Class: Insecta
- Order: Coleoptera
- Suborder: Polyphaga
- Infraorder: Elateriformia
- Family: Buprestidae
- Subfamily: Julodinae; Lacordaire, 1857

= Julodinae =

Subfamily of beetles

Julodinae is a subfamily of beetles in the family Buprestidae, containing the following genera:

- Aaata Semenov-Tian-Shanskij, 1906
- Amblysterna Saunders, 1871
- Julodella Semenov-Tian-Shanskij, 1871
- Julodis Eschscholtz, 1829
- †Microjulodis Haupt, 1950
- Neojulodis Kerremans, 1902
- Sternocera Eschscholtz, 1829
