= Demostis =

Scientific classification
- Kingdom: Animalia
- Phylum: Arthropoda
- Class: Insecta
- Order: Coleoptera
- Suborder: Polyphaga
- Infraorder: Elateriformia
- Family: Buprestidae
- Genus: Demostis; Kerremans, 1900

Type species
- Amorphosoma elongatum Kerremans, 1900

Genus of beetles

Demostis is a genus of beetles in the family Buprestidae, containing the following species:

- Demostis elongata (Kerremans, 1900)
- Demostis louwerensi Obenberger, 1940
