= Strandietta =

Scientific classification
- Kingdom: Animalia
- Phylum: Arthropoda
- Class: Insecta
- Order: Coleoptera
- Suborder: Polyphaga
- Infraorder: Elateriformia
- Family: Buprestidae
- Subfamily: Agrilinae
- Genus: Strandietta; Obenberger, 1931

Genus of beetles

Strandietta is a genus of beetles in the family Buprestidae, the jewel beetles. They are native to the Afrotropical realm.

Species include:

== Species ==
- Strandietta austroafricana Bellamy, 2008
- Strandietta jakobsoni Obenberger, 1931
- Strandietta maynei (Kerremans, 1914)
- Strandietta nodosa (Kerremans, 1914)
- Strandietta schoutedeni Obenberger, 1931
