= Agrilus alesi alesi =

Scientific classification
- Kingdom: Animalia
- Phylum: Arthropoda
- Class: Insecta
- Order: Coleoptera
- Suborder: Polyphaga
- Infraorder: Elateriformia
- Family: Buprestidae
- Genus: Agrilus
- Species: A. alesi
- Subspecies: A. a. alesi

Trinomial name
- Agrilus alesi alesi Obenberger, 1935

Subspecies of beetle

Agrilus alesi alesi is a subspecies of jewel beetle in the genus Agrilus and the species A. alesi. It is one of two subspecies in A. alesi, the other being Agrilus alesi sacchari.
