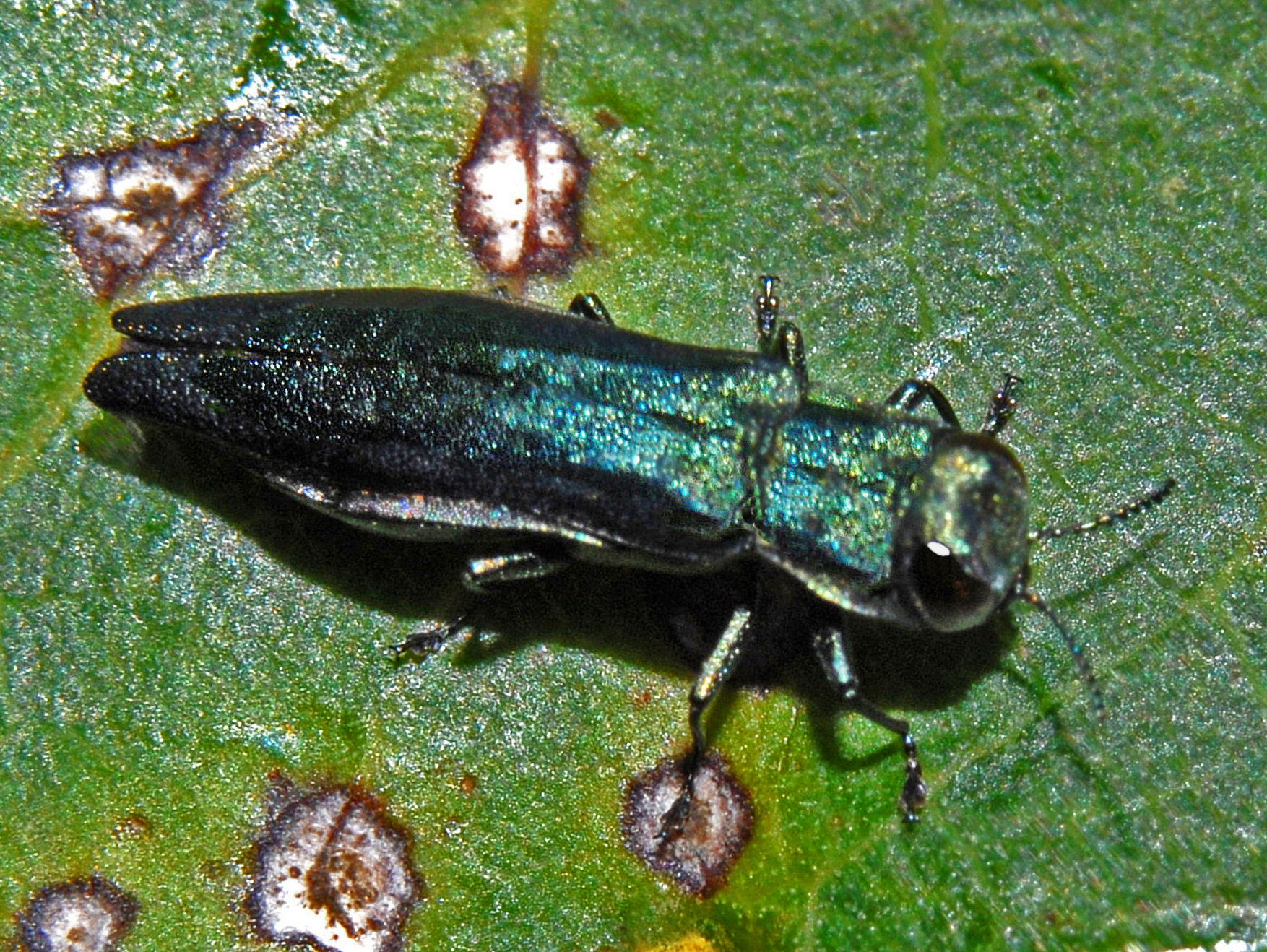

Scientific classification
- Kingdom: Animalia
- Phylum: Arthropoda
- Class: Insecta
- Order: Coleoptera
- Suborder: Polyphaga
- Infraorder: Elateriformia
- Family: Buprestidae
- Genus: Agrilus
- Species: A. suvorovi

Binomial name
- Agrilus suvorovi Obenberger, 1935

Synonyms
- Agrilus populneus Schaefer, 1946; Agrilus brussae Obenberger, 1956; Callichitones brussae; Callichitones populneus; Callichitones suvorovi; Euryotes brussae; Euryotes populneus; Euryotes suvorovi; Paradomorphus brussae; Paradomorphus populneus; Paradomorphus suvorovi; Samboides brussae; Samboides populneus; Samboides suvorovi; Teres brussae; Teres populneus; Teres suvorovi; Therysambus brussae; Therysambus populneus; Therysambus suvorovi

= Agrilus suvorovi =

Species of beetle

Agrilus suvorovi is a species of beetle in the family Buprestidae, the jewel beetles.

== Distribution ==
This species is present in most of Europe and in Asia, from Siberia to Japan.

== Description ==
The adult beetle is 6.5 to 9.5 millimeters long. It is metallic green or cyan in color.

== Biology ==
Agrilus suvorovi is a univoltine species. Adults can be found at the end of May or the beginning of June and may be found through July. The mainly feed on leaves of European Aspen (Populus tremula). The caused damage is negligible. Larvae hollow out long galleries into the bark and the wood of the host plants (Populus tremula, Populus deltoides, Populus alba) and are considered a pest. Larvae are mature in September and overwinter in the wood. The damage caused is often very serious and leads to death the plants.

It is sometimes reported that there are records of use of Willow species (Salix spp.) as host plants however these have been found to be false.
