= Clema elegans =

Scientific classification
- Kingdom: Animalia
- Phylum: Arthropoda
- Class: Insecta
- Order: Coleoptera
- Suborder: Polyphaga
- Infraorder: Elateriformia
- Family: Buprestidae
- Genus: Clema
- Species: C. elegans

Binomial name
- Clema elegans Obenberger, 1923

Species of beetle

Clema elegans is a species of jewel beetles in the genus Clema.
