= Paradorella =

Scientific classification
- Kingdom: Animalia
- Phylum: Arthropoda
- Class: Insecta
- Order: Coleoptera
- Suborder: Polyphaga
- Infraorder: Elateriformia
- Family: Buprestidae
- Subfamily: Agrilinae
- Genus: Paradorella; Obenberger, 1923

Genus of beetles

Paradorella is a genus of beetles in the family Buprestidae, the jewel beetles. They are native to Africa.

Species include:

== Species ==
- Paradorella capensis (Kerremans, 1903)
- Paradorella natalensis Bellamy, 2008
- Paradorella strandi Obenberger, 1923
- Paradorella subtilis (Obenberger, 1931)
- Paradorella wiedemannii (Gory & Laporte, 1839)
