= Asymades =

Scientific classification
- Kingdom: Animalia
- Phylum: Arthropoda
- Class: Insecta
- Order: Coleoptera
- Suborder: Polyphaga
- Infraorder: Elateriformia
- Family: Buprestidae
- Subfamily: Agrilinae
- Genus: Asymades; Kerremans, 1893

Genus of beetles

Asymades is a genus of beetles in the family Buprestidae, containing the following species:

- Asymades boranus (Obenberger, 1940)
- Asymades transvalensis Kerremans, 1893
