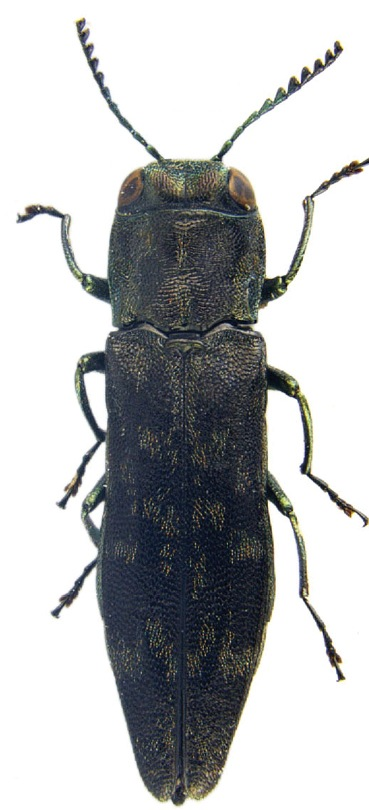

Scientific classification
- Kingdom: Animalia
- Phylum: Arthropoda
- Clade: Pancrustacea
- Class: Insecta
- Order: Coleoptera
- Suborder: Polyphaga
- Infraorder: Elateriformia
- Family: Buprestidae
- Genus: Agrilus
- Species: A. auriventris

Binomial name
- Agrilus auriventris Saunders, 1873

Synonyms
- Agrilus olivaceidorsis Obenberger, 1917

= Agrilus auriventris =

Citrus flat-headed borer

Species of beetle

Agrilus auriventris, commonly known as the citrus flat-headed borer, is a species of jewel beetle in the genus Agrilus. It can be found in China, Southeast Asia, and Japan.
