= Agrilus corrugatus =

Agrilus corrugatus Temporal range: Early Miocene (Burdigalian)

Scientific classification
- Kingdom: Animalia
- Phylum: Arthropoda
- Class: Insecta
- Order: Coleoptera
- Suborder: Polyphaga
- Infraorder: Elateriformia
- Family: Buprestidae
- Genus: Agrilus
- Species: †A. corrugatus

Binomial name
- †Agrilus corrugatus (Waterhouse, 1889)

Synonyms
- Agrilus associatulus Obenberger, 1933; Agrilus illigeri Obenberger, 1933; Agrilus mimulus Obenberger, 1933; Agrilus persimilis (Waterhouse, 1889); Paradomorphus corrugatus Waterhouse, 1889; Paradomorphus persimilis Waterhouse, 1889

Extinct species of beetle

Agrilus corrugatus is an extinct species of jewel beetle in the genus Agrilus that lived in China and Mexico during the Burdigalian age of the Early Miocene.
