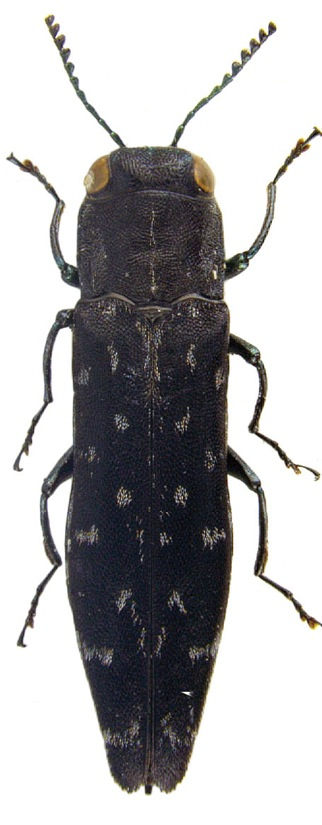
- Lectotype of Agrilus ambiguus

Scientific classification
- Kingdom: Animalia
- Phylum: Arthropoda
- Class: Insecta
- Order: Coleoptera
- Suborder: Polyphaga
- Infraorder: Elateriformia
- Family: Buprestidae
- Genus: Agrilus
- Species: A. ambiguus

Binomial name
- Agrilus ambiguus Kerremans, 1895

Synonyms
- Agrilus ambiguellus Kerremans, 1903

= Agrilus ambiguus =

Species of beetle

Agrilus ambiguus is a species of jewel beetle in the genus Agrilus. Another species in the same genus, Agrilus ambiguellus, is considered to be a junior objective synonym of A. ambiguus.
