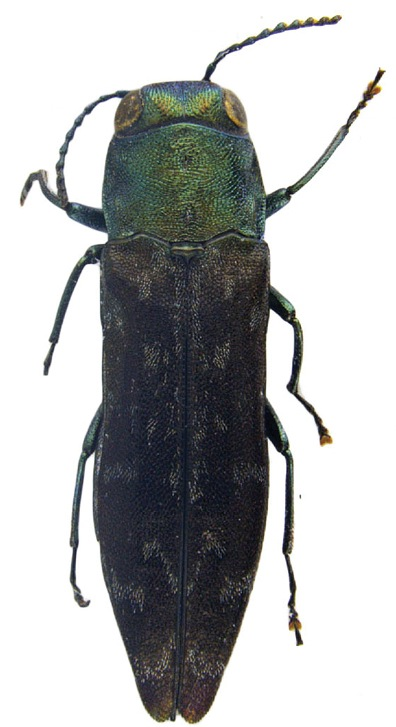

Scientific classification
- Kingdom: Animalia
- Phylum: Arthropoda
- Class: Insecta
- Order: Coleoptera
- Suborder: Polyphaga
- Infraorder: Elateriformia
- Family: Buprestidae
- Genus: Agrilus
- Species: A. alesi

Binomial name
- Agrilus alesi Obenberger, 1935

Subspecies
- See text

= Agrilus alesi =

Species of beetle

Agrilus alesi is a species of jewel beetle in the genus Agrilus.

== Subspecies ==
- Agrilus alesi alesi Obenberger, 1935
- Agrilus alesi sacchari Obenberger, 1940
