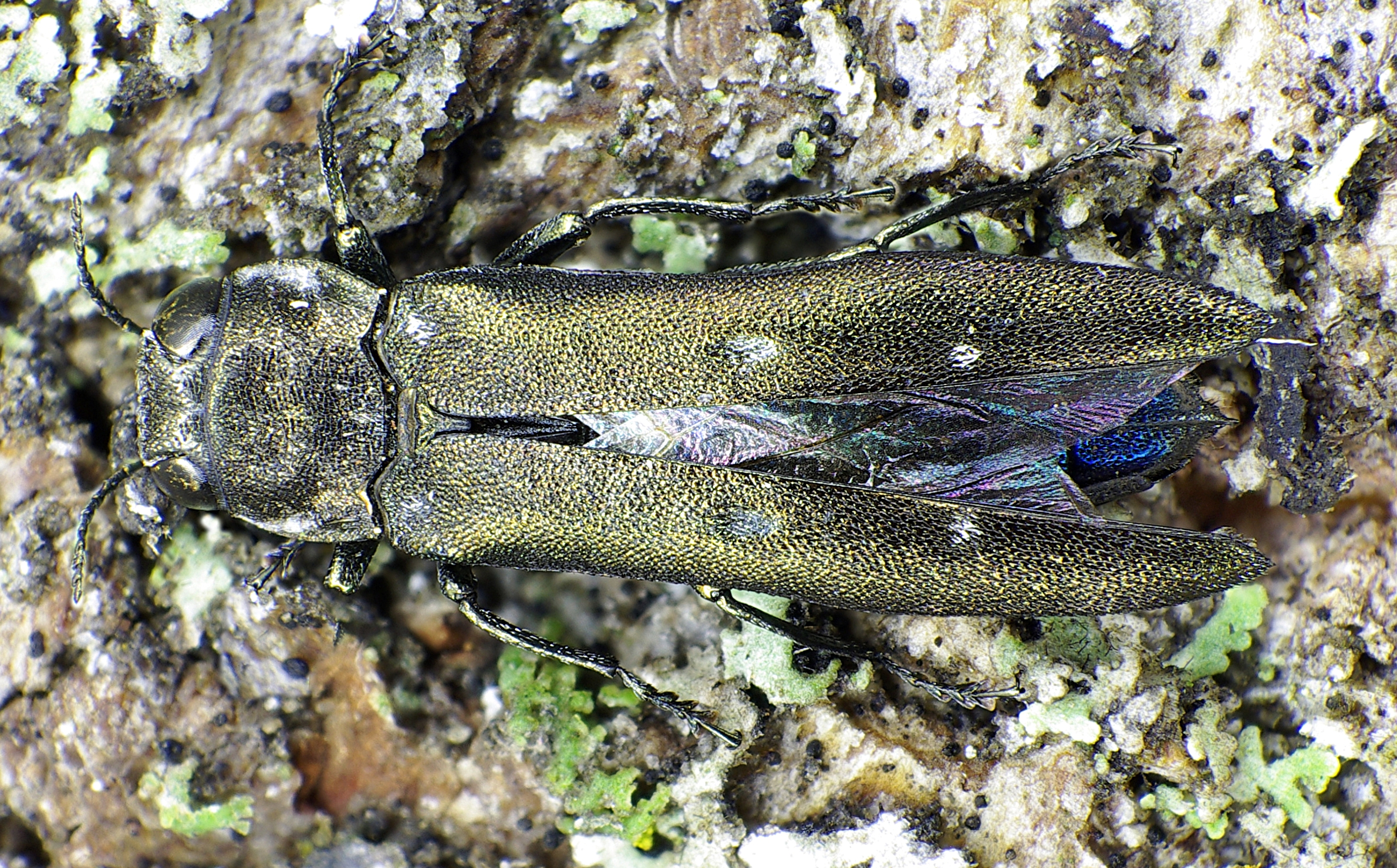

Scientific classification
- Kingdom: Animalia
- Phylum: Arthropoda
- Class: Insecta
- Order: Coleoptera
- Suborder: Polyphaga
- Infraorder: Elateriformia
- Family: Buprestidae
- Genus: Agrilus
- Species: A. ater

Binomial name
- Agrilus ater (Linnaeus, 1767)

Synonyms
- Agrilus eutenes Obenberger, 1924; Agrilus jureceki Obenberger, 1924; Agrilus sexguttatus (Brahm, 1791); Agrilus subeuropeellus Thomson, 1878; Buprestis ater Linnaeus, 1767; Buprestis sexguttatus Brahm, 1791

= Agrilus ater =

Species of beetle

Agrilus ater is a species of jewel beetle in the genus Agrilus.
