= Discoderoides =

Scientific classification
- Kingdom: Animalia
- Phylum: Arthropoda
- Class: Insecta
- Order: Coleoptera
- Suborder: Polyphaga
- Infraorder: Elateriformia
- Family: Buprestidae
- Genus: Discoderoides; Thery, 1936

Genus of beetles

Discoderoides is a genus of beetles in the family Buprestidae, containing the following species:

- Discoderoides abessynicus (Obenberger, 1931)
- Discoderoides africanus (Kerremans, 1907)
- Discoderoides alluaudi (Kerremans, 1914)
- Discoderoides cordae (Obenberger, 1922)
- Discoderoides derutus (Fahraeus, 1851)
- Discoderoides grewiae Thery, 1938
- Discoderoides helferi (Obenberger, 1922)
- Discoderoides immunitus (Fahraeus, 1851)
- Discoderoides kerremansi Bellamy, 1986
- Discoderoides macarthuri (Thery, 1941)
- Discoderoides priesneri Thery, 1936
- Discoderoides pygmaeus Bellamy, 1987
- Discoderoides theryi Bellamy, 1986
