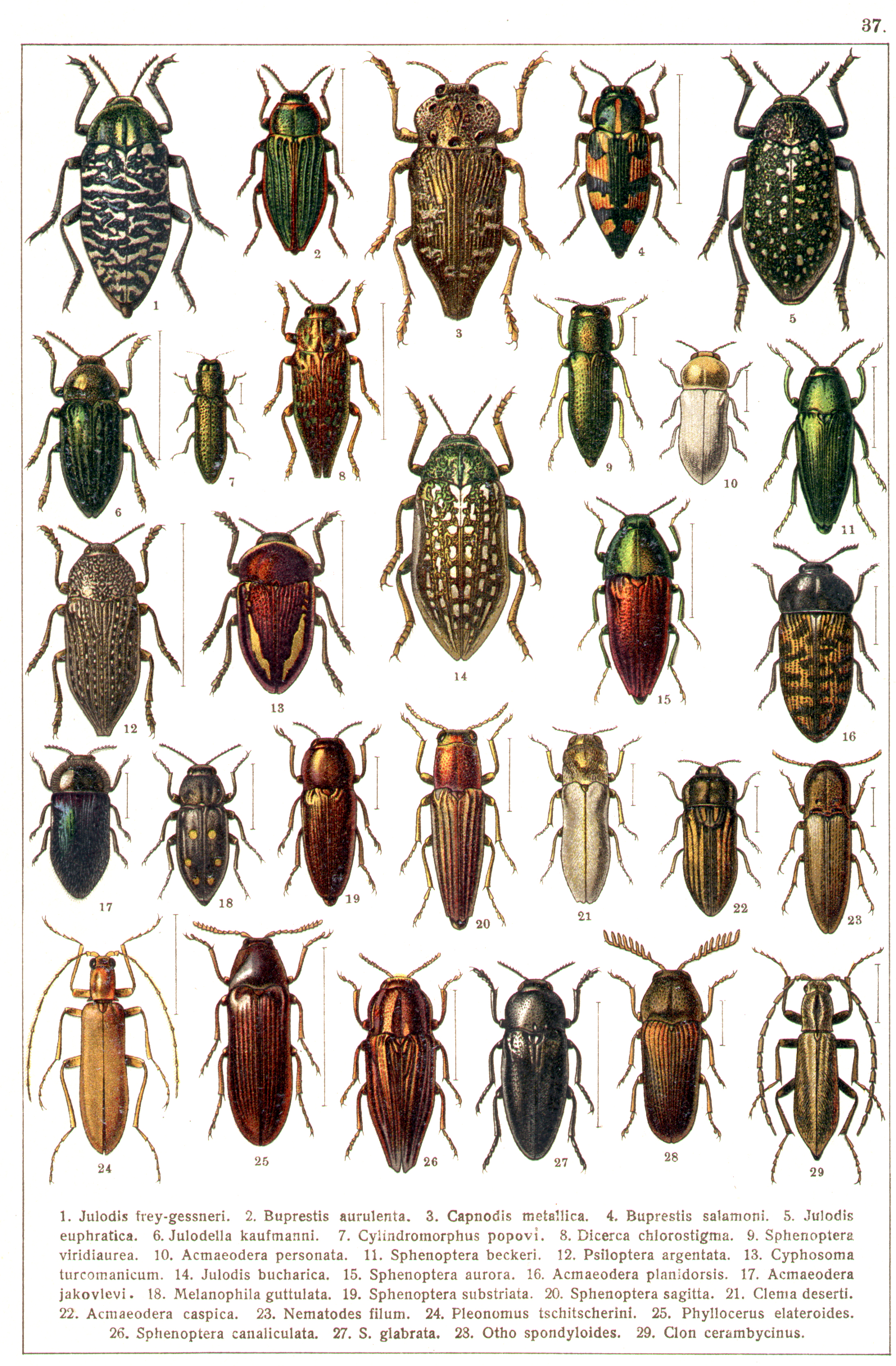
- 21. Clema deserti

Scientific classification
- Kingdom: Animalia
- Phylum: Arthropoda
- Class: Insecta
- Order: Coleoptera
- Suborder: Polyphaga
- Infraorder: Elateriformia
- Family: Buprestidae
- Genus: Clema; Semenov-Tian-Shanskij, 1900

= Clema =

Genus of beetles

Clema is a genus of beetles in the family Buprestidae, containing the following species:

- Clema deserti Semenov-Tian-Shanskij, 1900
- Clema elegans Obenberger, 1923
- Clema freudei Cobos, 1963
