= Aloe aaata =

Conservation status
- CITES Appendix II (CITES)

Scientific classification
- Kingdom: Plantae
- Clade: Tracheophytes
- Clade: Angiosperms
- Clade: Monocots
- Order: Asparagales
- Family: Asphodelaceae
- Subfamily: Asphodeloideae
- Genus: Aloe
- Species: A. aaata

Binomial name
- Aloe aaata T.A.McCoy & Lavranos

Species of succulent plant endemic to Saudi Arabia

Aloe aaata is a species of succulent plant in the genus Aloe that is endemic to southern Saudi Arabia.

== Taxonomy and history ==
Aloe aaata was described by Tom A. McCoy and John Jacob Lavranos in a 2014 article published in the Cactus and Succulent Journal which also described Aloe calliantha, another Aloe species endemic to Saudi Arabia. The authors proposed that A. aaata belongs to a group of closely related Arabian Aloe species with hairy perianths that includes Aloe lanata, Aloe tomentosa, and Aloe woodi.

The specific epithet aaata is derived from the Ancient Greek word aaatos (Ancient Greek: ἀάατον), which is variably translated to mean "inviolable", "invincible", or "unnatainable", in reference to the isolation and severe climate of the species' type locality. Originating from Homer's Iliad, where it was used to describe the waters of the River Styx, the term aaatos has formed the basis for several other binomial names, including the monotypic beetle genus Aaata and the oak species Quercus aaata.

== Distribution and habitat ==
Aloe aaata is known only from the Asir Province in southern Saudi Arabia, near the border of Yemen, where it grows on granite outcrops at around 2,000 m (6,600 ft) above sea level.

== Description ==
Aloe aaata is a stemless Aloe that produces offsets, often forming large clumps. Mature rosettes bear 12 to 18 upright, glaucous leaves, each measuring 20–25 cm (7.9–9.8 in) long, 8–12 cm (3.1–4.7 in) wide at the base, and 15–20 mm (0.59–0.79 in) thick. The leaves are lanceolate and light green in colour, greyer beneath, with a few elongated white spots concentrated towards the base of the leaf. The marginal teeth are brown, each measuring 1–2 mm and spaced 15–22 mm (0.59–0.87 in) apart. The erect inflorescence grows to 60–80 cm (24–31 in) tall with one or two branches. The racemes are cylindrical and densely packed with bright yellow-green flowers, each measuring 27–36 mm (1.1–1.4 in) long and covered in fine white hairs. The fruit is a hairy yellow-green capsule that measures 18–22 mm (0.71–0.87 in) long and 7–10 mm (0.28–0.39 in) and becomes brown as it dries.

== Ecology ==
In its natural habitat, Aloe aaata has been found growing alongside Acacia etbaica, Dodonaea angustifolia, Euphorbia schimperi, Kleinia odora, and Monolluma flava. Its flowers are known to be pollinated by honey bees (Apis mellifera) and Nile Valley sunbirds (Hedydipna metallica).
