= Entomogaster =

Scientific classification
- Kingdom: Animalia
- Phylum: Arthropoda
- Class: Insecta
- Order: Coleoptera
- Suborder: Polyphaga
- Infraorder: Elateriformia
- Family: Buprestidae
- Subfamily: Agrilinae
- Genus: Entomogaster; Saunders, 1871

Genus of beetles

Entomogaster is a genus of beetles in the family Buprestidae, containing the following species:

- Entomogaster aequalipennis Obenberger, 1931
- Entomogaster amplicollis Fairmaire, 1900
- Entomogaster apollo Obenberger, 1946
- Entomogaster asperula Thery, 1905
- Entomogaster carli Thery, 1936
- Entomogaster descarpentries Thery, 1937
- Entomogaster funebris Thery, 1937
- Entomogaster grandis Thery, 1937
- Entomogaster griseofasciata Obenberger, 1946
- Entomogaster hoschecki Thery, 1937
- Entomogaster iris Obenberger, 1946
- Entomogaster kerremansi Fairmaire, 1899
- Entomogaster maculipicta Obenberger, 1931
- Entomogaster mandrakana Obenberger, 1946
- Entomogaster mocquerysi Thery, 1905
- Entomogaster modesta Fairmaire, 1899
- Entomogaster octoguttata (Kerremans, 1894)
- Entomogaster posticalis (Fairmaire, 1903)
- Entomogaster pumilio Obenberger, 1946
- Entomogaster sexpunctata (Gory & Laporte, 1839)
