= Anodontodora =

Scientific classification
- Kingdom: Animalia
- Phylum: Arthropoda
- Class: Insecta
- Order: Coleoptera
- Suborder: Polyphaga
- Infraorder: Elateriformia
- Family: Buprestidae
- Genus: Anodontodora; Obenberger, 1931

Genus of beetles

Anodontodora is a genus of beetles in the family Buprestidae, containing the following species:

- Anodontodora aurulans (Obenberger, 1922)
- Anodontodora capicola (Obenberger, 1922)
