= Agrilozodes =

Scientific classification
- Kingdom: Animalia
- Phylum: Arthropoda
- Class: Insecta
- Order: Coleoptera
- Suborder: Polyphaga
- Infraorder: Elateriformia
- Family: Buprestidae
- Subfamily: Buprestinae
- Genus: Agrilozodes; Thery, 1927

Species
- See text

Synonyms
- Dactylozodes (Agrilozodes) Cobos, 1959

Genus of beetles

Agrilozodes is a genus of beetles in the family Buprestidae, tribe Stigmoderini, containing the following species:

== Species ==
The genus includes the following species:

- Agrilozodes ocularis (Kerremans, 1903)
- Agrilozodes praeclarus (Perroud, 1853)
- Agrilozodes pygmaeus (Kerremans, 1897)
- Agrilozodes suarezi (Cobos, 1962)
- Agrilozodes valverdei (Cobos, 1962)
