= Ethiopoeus =

Scientific classification
- Kingdom: Animalia
- Phylum: Arthropoda
- Class: Insecta
- Order: Coleoptera
- Suborder: Polyphaga
- Infraorder: Elateriformia
- Family: Buprestidae
- Genus: Ethiopoeus; Bellamy, 2008
- Species: E. croesus

Binomial name
- Ethiopoeus croesus (Obenberger, 1931)

Genus of beetles

Ethiopoeus is a monotypic genus of beetles in the family Buprestidae, the jewel beetles. The sole species, Ethiopoeus croesus was moved from genus Meliboeus in 2008. This beetle is native to Africa.
