= Calodema annae =

Scientific classification
- Kingdom: Animalia
- Phylum: Arthropoda
- Clade: Pancrustacea
- Class: Insecta
- Order: Coleoptera
- Suborder: Polyphaga
- Infraorder: Elateriformia
- Family: Buprestidae
- Genus: Calodema
- Species: C. annae

Binomial name
- Calodema annae Grasso, 2020

Species of beetle in the family Buprestidae

Calodema annae is a species of beetle in the family Buprestidae. It was described by Grasso in 2020.

== Systematics ==
- Buprestidae Leach, 1815
- Buprestinae Leach, 1815
- Stigmoderini Lacordaire, 1857
- Calodema Gory & Laporte de Castelnau, 1838

== Synonyms ==
Calodema antonkozlovi Pineda & Curletti, 2020: 75-79

== Distribution ==
Calodema annae is known from Indonesia, Arfak Mountains and Weyland Mountains.

== Etymology ==
The species is named in honour of the Australian entomologist Jennifer Anne Gardner.
