= Chalcophlocteis =

Scientific classification
- Kingdom: Animalia
- Phylum: Arthropoda
- Class: Insecta
- Order: Coleoptera
- Suborder: Polyphaga
- Infraorder: Elateriformia
- Family: Buprestidae
- Subfamily: Agrilinae
- Genus: Chalcophlocteis; Obenberger, 1924

Genus of beetles

Chalcophlocteis is a genus of beetles in the family Buprestidae, containing the following species:

- Chalcophlocteis dives (Peringuey, 1908)
- Chalcophlocteis hauseri Obenberger, 1931
