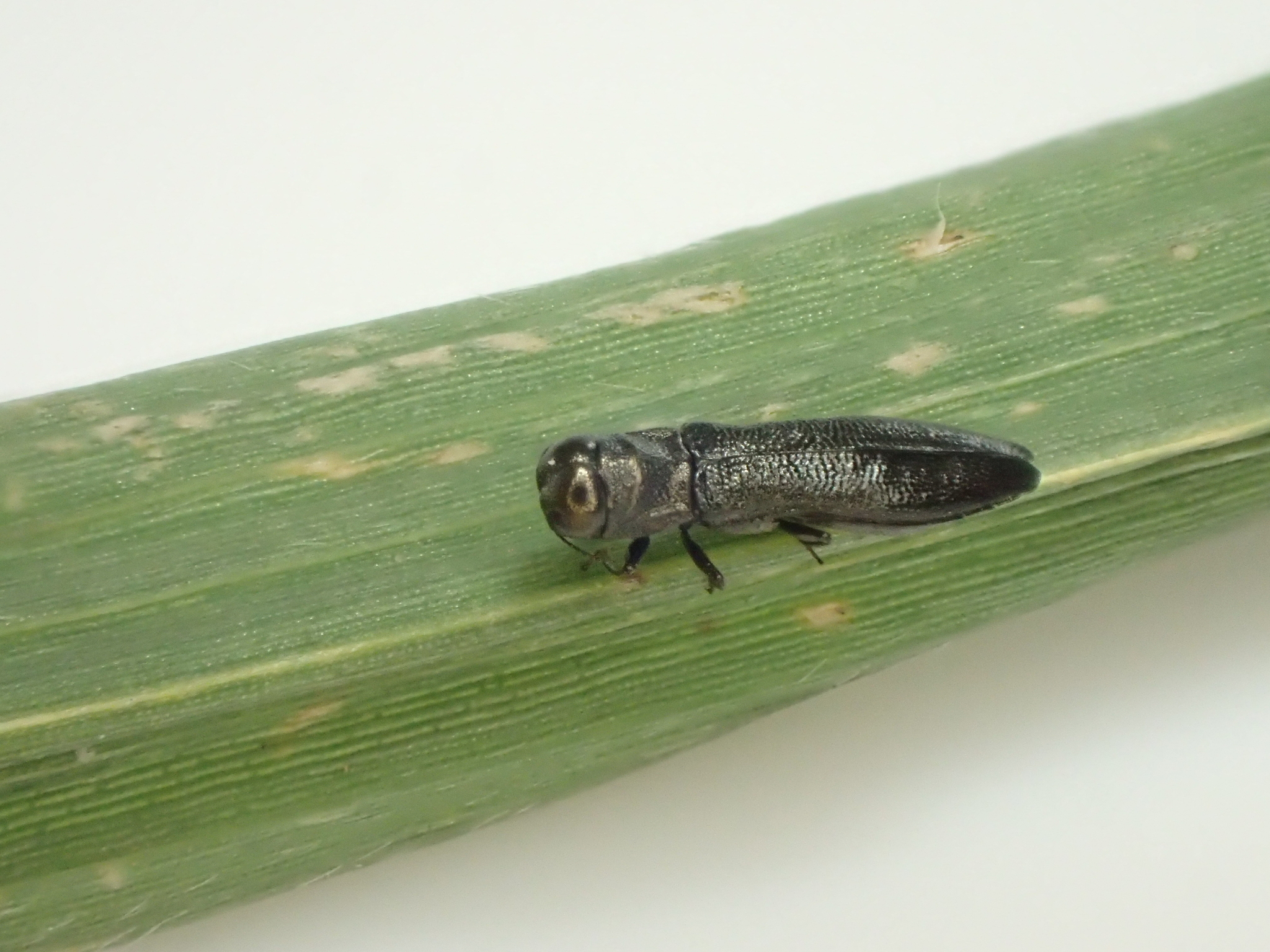
- Paracylindromorphus japanensis, Japan

Scientific classification
- Kingdom: Animalia
- Phylum: Arthropoda
- Class: Insecta
- Order: Coleoptera
- Suborder: Polyphaga
- Infraorder: Elateriformia
- Family: Buprestidae
- Subfamily: Agrilinae
- Tribe: Aphanisticini
- Subtribe: Cylindromorphina
- Genus: Paracylindromorphus; Théry, 1930

Synonyms
- Agrilomorphus Portevin, 1931

= Paracylindromorphus =

Genus of beetles

Paracylindromorphus is a genus of metallic wood-boring beetles in the family Buprestidae. There are more than 70 described species in Paracylindromorphus, found in Asia, Europe, and Africa.

== Species ==
These 75 species belong to the genus Paracylindromorphus:

- Paracylindromorphus achardi (Obenberger, 1928)
- Paracylindromorphus africanus (Obenberger, 1924)
- Paracylindromorphus albifrons (Théry, 1905)
- Paracylindromorphus alluaudi (Kerremans, 1914)
- Paracylindromorphus assamensis Obenberger, 1947
- Paracylindromorphus bakeri (Obenberger, 1928)
- Paracylindromorphus birmanicus Obenberger, 1947
- Paracylindromorphus bodongi (Kerremans, 1914)
- Paracylindromorphus bodongianus Théry, 1954
- Paracylindromorphus braunsi (Obenberger, 1923)
- Paracylindromorphus burgeoni Théry, 1954
- Paracylindromorphus cairensis Théry, 1930
- Paracylindromorphus carinulosus Cobos, 1953
- Paracylindromorphus cashmirensis Obenberger, 1935
- Paracylindromorphus cephalopristis Bellamy, 1988
- Paracylindromorphus cephalotes Cobos, 1960
- Paracylindromorphus chinensis (Obenberger, 1927)
- Paracylindromorphus congolanus (Obenberger, 1924)
- Paracylindromorphus corporaali (Obenberger, 1922)
- Paracylindromorphus docilis (Kerremans, 1914)
- Paracylindromorphus drescheri Obenberger, 1932
- Paracylindromorphus elongatulus Cobos, 1960
- Paracylindromorphus formosanus (Miwa & Chûjô, 1935)
- Paracylindromorphus fujianensis Kubán, 2006
- Paracylindromorphus gebhardti (Obenberger, 1927)
- Paracylindromorphus grandis Cobos, 1953
- Paracylindromorphus helferi Cobos, 1960
- Paracylindromorphus hovus Théry, 1929
- Paracylindromorphus japanensis (Saunders, 1873)
- Paracylindromorphus javanicus (Obenberger, 1928)
- Paracylindromorphus jeanneli (Kerremans, 1914)
- Paracylindromorphus juvenilis (Kerremans, 1903)
- Paracylindromorphus klapperichi Obenberger, 1947
- Paracylindromorphus larminati Baudon, 1968
- Paracylindromorphus lebedevi (Obenberger, 1928)
- Paracylindromorphus levicollis (Péringuey, 1908)
- Paracylindromorphus machulkai Obenberger, 1935
- Paracylindromorphus montanus (Obenberger, 1924)
- Paracylindromorphus montivagus Fisher, 1935
- Paracylindromorphus munroi (Obenberger, 1928)
- Paracylindromorphus mutilloides Théry, 1954
- Paracylindromorphus natalensis (Obenberger, 1928)
- Paracylindromorphus orientalis (Kerremans, 1892)
- Paracylindromorphus pinguis (Fairmaire, 1876)
- Paracylindromorphus planithorax Cobos, 1960
- Paracylindromorphus puberulus Cobos, 1960
- Paracylindromorphus rhodesicus (Obenberger, 1924)
- Paracylindromorphus richteri Théry, 1937
- Paracylindromorphus rivularis (Obenberger, 1924)
- Paracylindromorphus salisburyensis Théry, 1954
- Paracylindromorphus sculpturatus Cobos, 1953
- Paracylindromorphus semenovi Théry, 1937
- Paracylindromorphus sericatus Théry, 1954
- Paracylindromorphus similis Cobos, 1953
- Paracylindromorphus simlaicus (Obenberger, 1924)
- Paracylindromorphus sinae Obenberger, 1947
- Paracylindromorphus sinuatus (Abeille de Perrin, 1897)
- Paracylindromorphus somalicus (Kerremans, 1898)
- Paracylindromorphus spinipennis (Bedel, 1890)
- Paracylindromorphus srogli Obenberger, 1932
- Paracylindromorphus subcylindricus (Kerremans, 1899)
- Paracylindromorphus subuliformis (Mannerheim, 1837)
- Paracylindromorphus sundaicus Obenberger, 1935
- Paracylindromorphus superbus Théry, 1954
- Paracylindromorphus tananarivensis Obenberger, 1942
- Paracylindromorphus thomasseti (Obenberger, 1928)
- Paracylindromorphus togoensis (Obenberger, 1924)
- Paracylindromorphus tokioensis Théry, 1937
- Paracylindromorphus transverserugosus (Obenberger, 1924)
- Paracylindromorphus transversicollis (Reitter, 1913)
- Paracylindromorphus ukerewensis Obenberger, 1935
- Paracylindromorphus vansoni Obenberger, 1935
- Paracylindromorphus verlainei Théry, 1954
- Paracylindromorphus villiersi Descarpentries, 1970
- Paracylindromorphus waterloti Théry, 1929
