= Microjulodis =

Microjulodis auratus

Scientific classification
- Kingdom: Animalia
- Phylum: Arthropoda
- Class: Insecta
- Order: Coleoptera
- Suborder: Polyphaga
- Infraorder: Elateriformia
- Family: Buprestidae
- Genus: †Microjulodis; Haupt, 1950
- Species: †M. auratus

Binomial name
- †Microjulodis auratus Haupt, 1950

Genus of beetles

Microjulodis auratus is a fossil species of beetles in the family Buprestidae, the only species in the genus Microjulodis.
