= Cobosella =

Cobosella laesicollis

Scientific classification
- Kingdom: Animalia
- Phylum: Arthropoda
- Class: Insecta
- Order: Coleoptera
- Suborder: Polyphaga
- Infraorder: Elateriformia
- Family: Buprestidae
- Genus: Cobosella; Özdikmen, 2006
- Species: C. laesicollis

Binomial name
- Cobosella laesicollis (Fairmaire, 1902)

Genus of beetles

Cobosella laesicollis is a species of beetle in the family Buprestidae, the only species in the genus Cobosella.
