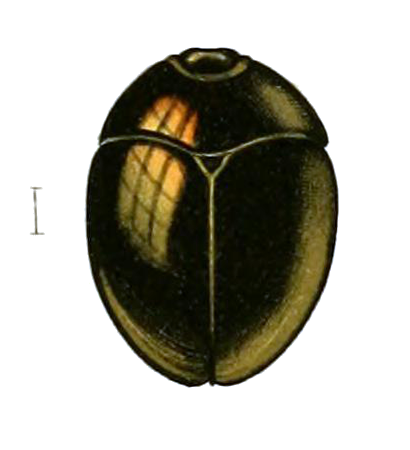
- Galbella hovana

Scientific classification
- Kingdom: Animalia
- Phylum: Arthropoda
- Class: Insecta
- Order: Coleoptera
- Suborder: Polyphaga
- Infraorder: Elateriformia
- Family: Buprestidae
- Subfamily: Galbellinae; Lacordaire, 1857
- Genus: Galbella; Westwood, 1848

= Galbella =

Genus of beetles

Galbella is an exclusively Old World genus of beetles in the family Buprestidae, placed in the monotypic subfamily Galbellinae. It contains the following species:

- Galbella abyssinica Kerremans, 1899
- Galbella acaciae Descarpentries & Mateu, 1965
- Galbella acuminata Bellamy in Bellamy & Holm, 1986
- Galbella adamantina Bellamy in Bellamy & Holm, 1986
- Galbella aeneola (Obenberger, 1936)
- Galbella africana (Kerremans, 1907)
- Galbella albanensis Bellamy in Bellamy & Holm, 1986
- Galbella alia Bellamy in Bellamy & Holm, 1986
- Galbella angolensis Théry, 1947
- Galbella anamita (Obenberger, 1924)
- Galbella anniae (Obenberger, 1936)
- Galbella antiqua Théry, 1905
- Galbella argodi Bellamy in Bellamy & Holm, 1986
- Galbella atricolor (Abeille de Perrin, 1907)
- Galbella auberti Théry, 1930
- Galbella bartoni (Obenberger, 1936)
- Galbella beccarii (Gestro, 1872)
- Galbella byrrhoides Théry, 1905
- Galbella caesia Bellamy in Bellamy & Holm, 1986
- Galbella capeneri Cobos, 1953
- Galbella citri (Obenberger, 1936)
- Galbella coomani Théry, 1930
- Galbella cuneiformis Kerremans, 1898
- Galbella delagoa Bellamy in Bellamy & Holm, 1986
- Galbella dukeorum Bellamy, 2000
- Galbella ennediana Descarpentries & Mateu, 1965
- Galbella fabichi (Obenberger, 1936)
- Galbella felix (Marseul, 1866)
- Galbella gigantea (Théry, 1955)
- Galbella gracilis Bellamy in Bellamy & Holm, 1986
- Galbella grandis Bellamy in Bellamy & Holm, 1986
- Galbella gridellii (Obenberger, 1936)
- Galbella hantamensis Bellamy in Bellamy & Holm, 1986
- Galbella harti (Janson, 1891)
- Galbella herera (Obenberger, 1936)
- Galbella heteromorpha Bellamy in Bellamy & Holm, 1986
- Galbella hofferi (Obenberger, 1937)
- Galbella holmi Kalashian, 1996
- Galbella holzschuhi Volkovitsh, 2008
- Galbella hovana (Fairmaire, 1902)
- Galbella howas Kerremans, 1894
- Galbella indica Obenberger, 1922
- Galbella jeanelli Théry, 1939
- Galbella jocosa Théry, 1930
- Galbella kalahari Bellamy in Bellamy & Holm, 1986
- Galbella khurdae (Obenberger, 1924)
- Galbella lacustris (Obenberger, 1924)
- Galbella lata (Fairmaire, 1900)
- Galbella levis Kerremans, 1896
- Galbella limbata Théry, 1905
- Galbella maindroni Bellamy in Bellamy & Holm, 1986
- Galbella marseuli (Obenberger, 1936)
- Galbella muelleri (Obenberger, 1936)
- Galbella namibia Bellamy in Bellamy & Holm, 1986
- Galbella nanula (Obenberger, 1939)
- Galbella natalensis Bellamy in Bellamy & Holm, 1986
- Galbella nigeriensis Bellamy in Bellamy & Holm, 1986
- Galbella nyassica Bellamy in Bellamy & Holm, 1986
- Galbella occidentalis Bellamy in Bellamy & Holm, 1986
- Galbella omaruru Bellamy in Bellamy & Holm, 1986
- Galbella pachyscheloides Bellamy in Bellamy & Holm, 1986
- Galbella parma Bellamy in Bellamy & Holm, 1986
- Galbella perrieri (Fairmaire, 1900)
- Galbella perroti Descarpentries & Villiers, 1964
- Galbella polula Bellamy in Bellamy & Holm, 1986
- Galbella postuma Bellamy in Bellamy & Holm, 1986
- Galbella purpurea Bellamy in Bellamy & Holm, 1986
- Galbella radja (Obenberger, 1936)
- Galbella raffrayi Théry, 1930
- Galbella regina (Obenberger, 1936)
- Galbella simula Bellamy in Bellamy & Holm, 1986
- Galbella somereni Théry, 1930
- Galbella stilla Bellamy in Bellamy & Holm, 1986
- Galbella strandi Obenberger, 1922
- Galbella trachydea (Fairmaire, 1902)
- Galbella triangularis Théry, 1923
- Galbella troetroe Bellamy in Bellamy & Holm, 1986
- Galbella turneri Théry, 1941
- Galbella ukerewensis (Obenberger, 1937)
- Galbella vansoni (Obenberger, 1936)
- Galbella villiersi (Obenberger, 1950)
- Galbella violacea Westwood, 1848
- Galbella zambesica (Obenberger, 1936)
- Galbella zanzibarica (Fairmaire, 1884)
- Galbella zyziphi (Obenberger, 1936)
