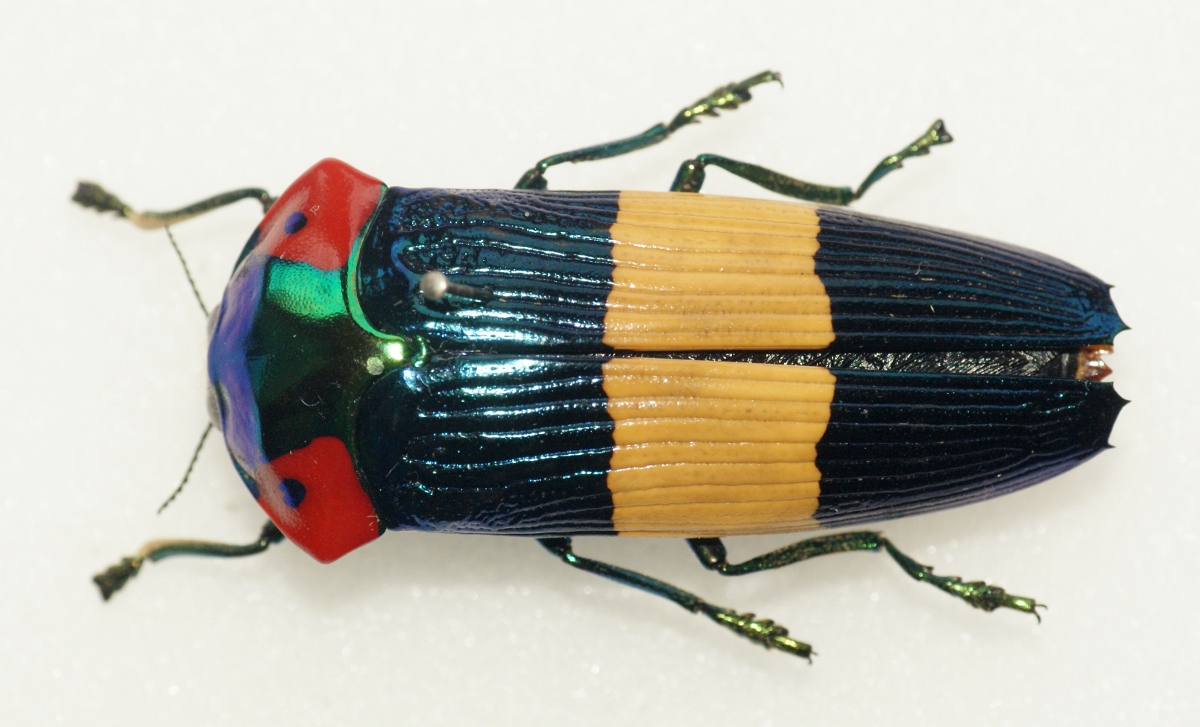
- Calodema ribbei

Scientific classification
- Kingdom: Animalia
- Phylum: Arthropoda
- Class: Insecta
- Order: Coleoptera
- Suborder: Polyphaga
- Infraorder: Elateriformia
- Family: Buprestidae
- Genus: Calodema; Gory & Laporte, 1838

= Calodema =

Genus of beetles

Calodema is a genus of beetles in the family Buprestidae, tribe Stigmoderini, containing the following species:

- Calodema annae Grasso, 2020
- Calodema bifasciata Neef de Sainval & Lander, 1993
- Calodema blairi Neef de Sainval & Lander, 1994
- Calodema hanloni Nylander, 2008
- Calodema hudsoni Neef de Sainval, 1998
- Calodema longitarsis Nylander, 2008
- Calodema mariettae Nylander, 1993
- Calodema plebeia Jordan, 1895
- Calodema regalis (Gory & Laporte, 1838)
- Calodema ribbei van de Poll, 1885
- Calodema rubrimarginata Barker, 1993
- Calodema ryoi Endo, 1998
- Calodema sainvali Nylander, 2000
- Calodema suhandae Nylander, 2004
- Calodema vicksoni Nylander, 2006
- Calodema wallacei wallacei Deyrolle, 1864
- Calodema wallacei meeki Grasso, Vodoz & Menufandu, 2021
