= Bubastoides =

Scientific classification
- Kingdom: Animalia
- Phylum: Arthropoda
- Class: Insecta
- Order: Coleoptera
- Suborder: Polyphaga
- Infraorder: Elateriformia
- Family: Buprestidae
- Genus: Bubastoides; Kerremans, 1909

Genus of beetles

Bubastoides is a genus of beetles in the family Buprestidae, containing the following species:

- Bubastoides argodi Kerremans, 1909
- Bubastoides kadleci Bily, 2008
