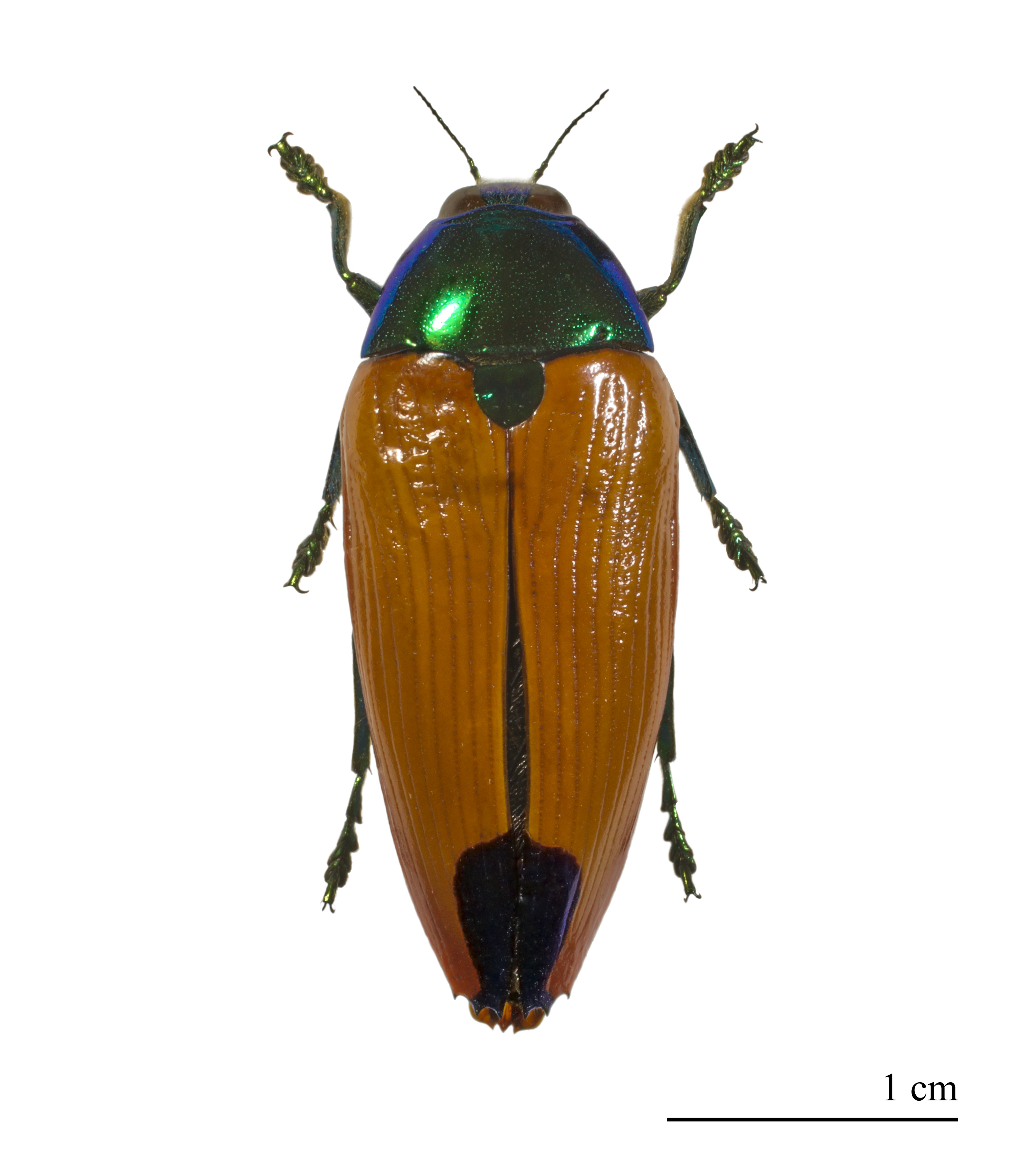
- Metaxymorpha gloriosa

Scientific classification
- Kingdom: Animalia
- Phylum: Arthropoda
- Class: Insecta
- Order: Coleoptera
- Suborder: Polyphaga
- Infraorder: Elateriformia
- Family: Buprestidae
- Genus: Metaxymorpha; Parry, 1848

= Metaxymorpha =

Genus of beetles

Metaxymorpha is a genus of beetles in the family Buprestidae, containing the following species:

- Metaxymorpha alexanderiensis Nylander, 2008
- Metaxymorpha apicalis (van de Poll, 1886)
- Metaxymorpha apicerubra Thery, 1923
- Metaxymorpha dohertyi Thery, 1923
- Metaxymorpha gloriosa Blackburn, 1894
- Metaxymorpha grayii (Parry, 1848)
- Metaxymorpha hanloni Nylander, 2008
- Metaxymorpha hauseri Thery, 1926
- Metaxymorpha hilleri Nylander, 2004
- Metaxymorpha hudsoni Nylander, 2001
- Metaxymorpha imitator Neef de Sainval, 1994
- Metaxymorpha landeri Nylander, 2001
- Metaxymorpha mariettae Nylander, 2004
- Metaxymorpha meeki Thery, 1923
- Metaxymorpha nigrofasciata Nylander, 2001
- Metaxymorpha nigrosuturalis Neef de Sainval & Lander, 1993
- Metaxymorpha pledgeri Nylander, 2001
- Metaxymorpha sternalis Hoscheck, 1931
