= Madecorformica =

Scientific classification
- Kingdom: Animalia
- Phylum: Arthropoda
- Class: Insecta
- Order: Coleoptera
- Suborder: Polyphaga
- Infraorder: Elateriformia
- Family: Buprestidae
- Subfamily: Agrilinae
- Genus: Madecorformica; Bellamy, 2008
- Species: M. silhouetta

Binomial name
- Madecorformica silhouetta Bellamy, 2008

Genus of beetles

Madecorformica is a monotypic beetle genus in the family Buprestidae, the jewel beetles. The only species is Madecorformica silhouetta, native to Madagascar.

This beetle is an ant-mimic.
