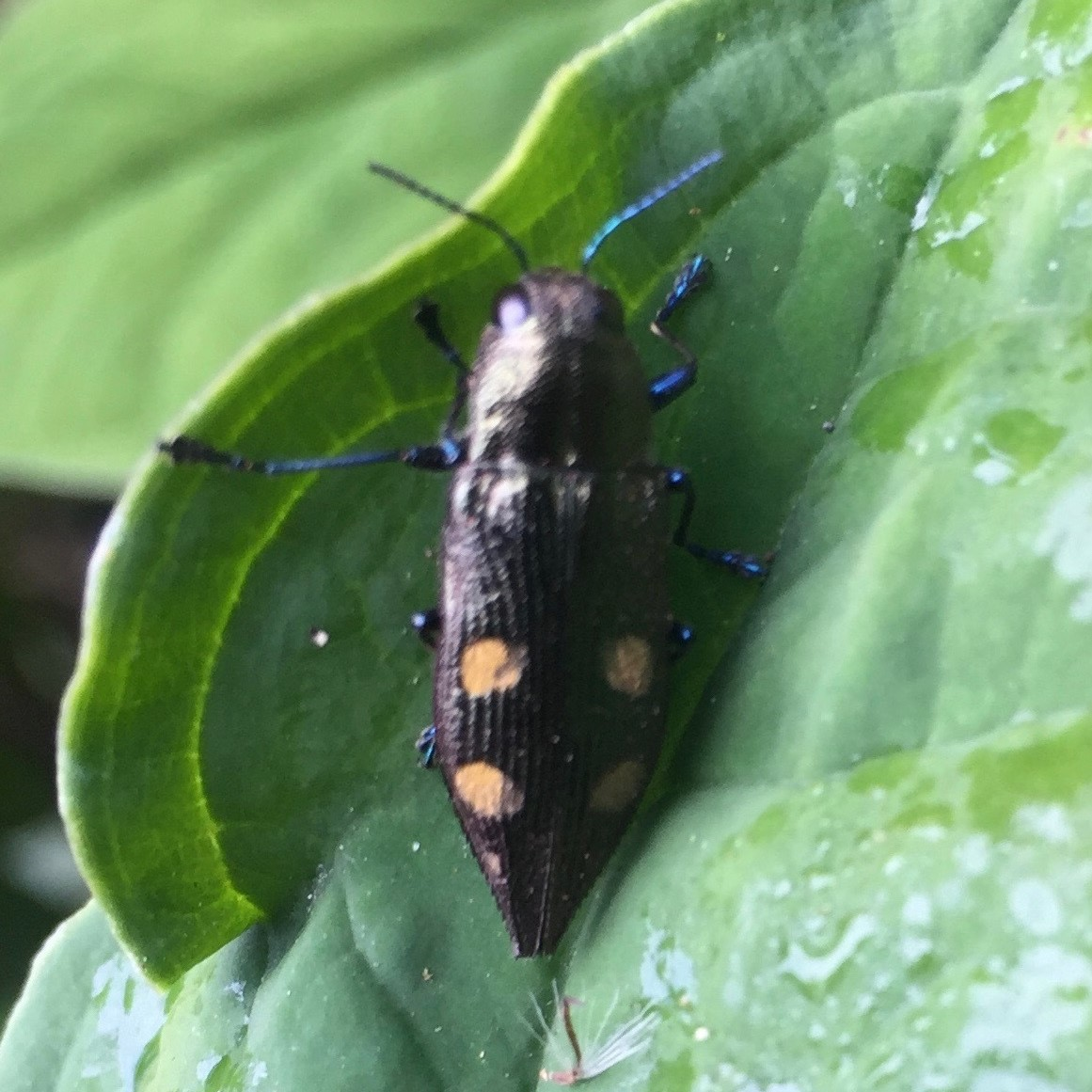
- Halecia onorei

Scientific classification
- Kingdom: Animalia
- Phylum: Arthropoda
- Class: Insecta
- Order: Coleoptera
- Suborder: Polyphaga
- Infraorder: Elateriformia
- Family: Buprestidae
- Genus: Halecia; Laporte & Gory, 1837

= Halecia =

Genus of beetles

Halecia is a genus of beetles in the family Buprestidae, containing the following species:

- Halecia acutipennis (Laporte & Gory, 1837)
- Halecia allecto Obenberger, 1958
- Halecia angulosa (Chevrolat, 1838)
- Halecia angustivertex Obenberger, 1958
- Halecia asperata Bellamy, 1991
- Halecia auropunctata Kerremans, 1897
- Halecia bahiana Kerremans, 1897
- Halecia batesii Saunders, 1874
- Halecia bicolor Saunders, 1874
- Halecia blandula Obenberger, 1958
- Halecia caesia (Gory, 1840)
- Halecia chrysodemoides Saunders, 1874
- Halecia cicatricosa Kerremans, 1908
- Halecia cleteriformis Théry, 1930
- Halecia cocosae Bellamy, 1986
- Halecia cognata Thomson, 1878
- Halecia corinthia (Gory, 1840)
- Halecia costata Saunders, 1874
- Halecia costuligera Obenberger, 1958
- Halecia cupreosignata Waterhouse, 1882
- Halecia cuprina Kerremans, 1897
- Halecia cyanea Théry, 1908
- Halecia debyi Waterhouse, 1889
- Halecia decemimpressa (Chevrolat, 1838)
- Halecia deliciosa Kerremans, 1919
- Halecia demuthi Théry, 1930
- Halecia episcopalis Obenberger, 1922
- Halecia equadorica Obenberger, 1958
- Halecia erosa Kerremans, 1909
- Halecia fulgidipes Lucas, 1858
- Halecia gounellei Kerremans, 1897
- Halecia granulosa Théry, 1908
- Halecia humboldti Obenberger, 1958
- Halecia ignicollis Théry, 1923
- Halecia igniventris Saunders, 1874
- Halecia impressa (Fabricius, 1775)
- Halecia impressipennis Lucas, 1857
- Halecia iridea (Mannerheim, 1837)
- Halecia jacobi Obenberger, 1958
- Halecia jousselini (Laporte & Gory, 1837)
- Halecia lacordairei Thomson, 1878
- Halecia laticollis Waterhouse, 1889
- Halecia maculicollis Saunders, 1872
- Halecia maculipennis (Laporte & Gory, 1837)
- Halecia maculiventris Obenberger, 1958
- Halecia mexicana Kerremans, 1909
- Halecia moneta Kerremans, 1908
- Halecia monticola Kirsch, 1866
- Halecia muelleri Obenberger, 1958
- Halecia nigriventris Théry, 1930
- Halecia octopunctata (Fabricius, 1801)
- Halecia olivacea Théry, 1908
- Halecia onorei Cobos, 1990
- Halecia parallela Saunders, 1874
- Halecia picticeps Saunders, 1874
- Halecia pictifrons Kerremans, 1908
- Halecia prosternalis Obenberger, 1958
- Halecia pseudotrisulcata Obenberger, 1958
- Halecia puncticollis Thomson, 1878
- Halecia punctuliventris Obenberger, 1958
- Halecia purpuriventris Théry, 1908
- Halecia quadricostata Obenberger, 1958
- Halecia quadriimpressa Thomson, 1878
- Halecia rugicollis Saunders, 1874
- Halecia rugipennis (Laporte & Gory, 1837)
- Halecia rugosa Waterhouse, 1905
- Halecia seraphini Théry, 1930
- Halecia sexfoveata (Chevrolat, 1838)
- Halecia simplex Kirsch, 1873
- Halecia smaragdiventris Obenberger, 1958
- Halecia soror Waterhouse, 1905
- Halecia spinolae (Gory, 1840)
- Halecia sternalis Kerremans, 1900
- Halecia stuarti Théry, 1930
- Halecia subsimilis (Mannerheim, 1837)
- Halecia sulcicollis (Dalman, 1823)
- Halecia trilineata Waterhouse, 1905
- Halecia tristicula Obenberger, 1922
- Halecia trisulcata (Laporte & Gory, 1837)
- Halecia ventralis (Laporte & Gory, 1837)
- Halecia verecunda Chevrolat, 1867
- Halecia violaceiventris Obenberger, 1924
- Halecia viridipes Lucas, 1857
- Halecia viridisplendens Waterhouse, 1905
- Halecia zikani Obenberger, 1958
