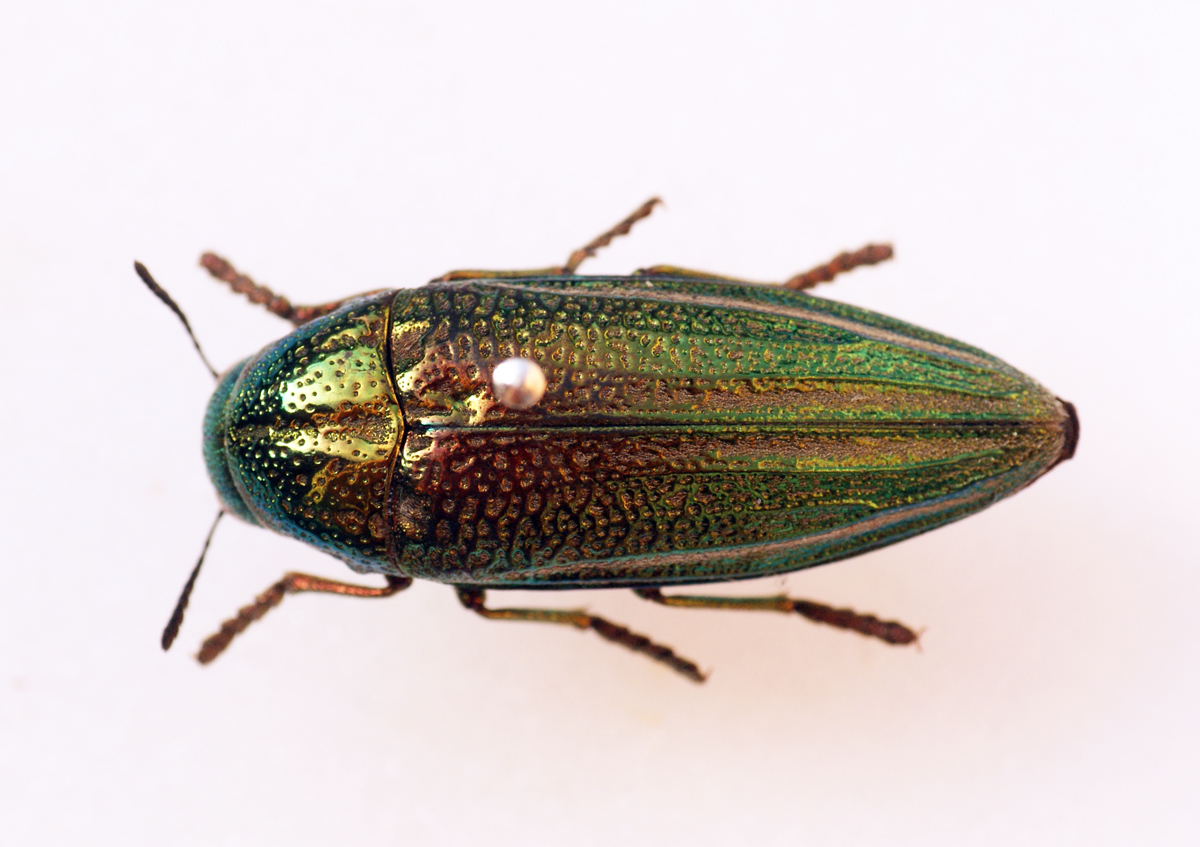
- Amblysterna natalensis

Scientific classification
- Kingdom: Animalia
- Phylum: Arthropoda
- Class: Insecta
- Order: Coleoptera
- Suborder: Polyphaga
- Infraorder: Elateriformia
- Family: Buprestidae
- Genus: Amblysterna; Saunders, 1871

= Amblysterna =

Genus of beetles

Amblysterna is a genus of beetles in the family Buprestidae, containing the following species:

- Amblysterna johnstoni Waterhouse, 1885
- Amblysterna natalensis (Fahraeus, 1851)
