= Julodella =

Scientific classification
- Kingdom: Animalia
- Phylum: Arthropoda
- Class: Insecta
- Order: Coleoptera
- Suborder: Polyphaga
- Infraorder: Elateriformia
- Family: Buprestidae
- Genus: Julodella; Semenov, 1893

Genus of beetles

Julodella is a genus of beetles in the family Buprestidae, containing the following species:

- Julodella abeillei (Théry, 1893)
- Julodella abyssinica (Théry, 1928)
- Julodella bicolor (Obst, 1906)
- Julodella brevilata (Semenov, 1893)
- Julodella cicatricosa (Germar, 1824)
- Julodella cymbiformis Bílý, 1990
- Julodella dilaticollis (Semenov, 1893)
- Julodella fairmairei (Théry, 1895)
- Julodella globithorax (Steven, 1830)
- Julodella haarlovi Descarpentries, 1965
- Julodella impluviata (Semenov, 1893)
- Julodella impressithorax Bílý, 1983
- Julodella iranica Bílý, 1983
- Julodella kaufmanni (Ballion, 1871)
- Julodella mesopotamica (Holdhaus, 1920)
- Julodella parvula Bílý, 1983
- Julodella plasoni Marseul, 1889
- Julodella schochi (Théry, 1896)
- Julodella shestoperovi Stepanov, 1959
- Julodella testaceipes Obenberger, 1928
- Julodella zarudniana Semenov, 1903
