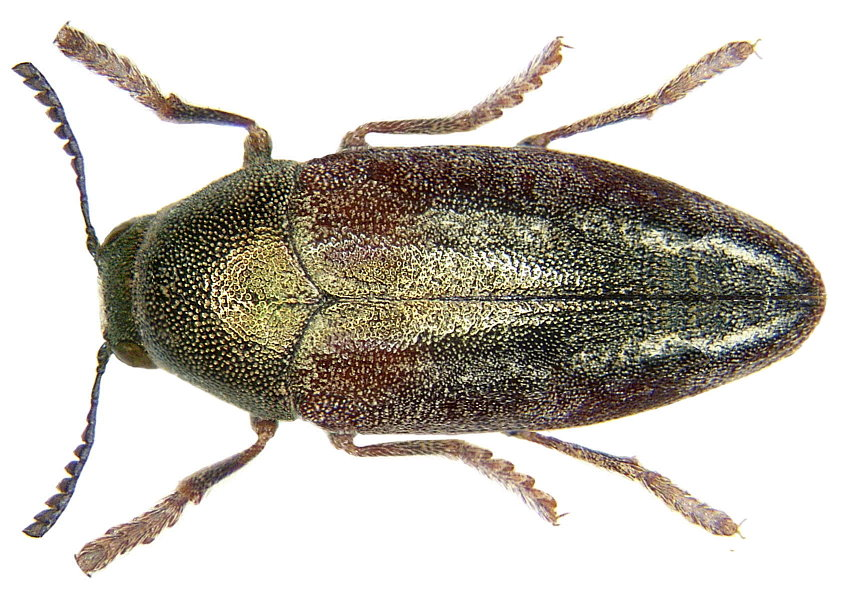
- Neojulodis rufolimbata

Scientific classification
- Kingdom: Animalia
- Phylum: Arthropoda
- Class: Insecta
- Order: Coleoptera
- Suborder: Polyphaga
- Infraorder: Elateriformia
- Family: Buprestidae
- Genus: Neojulodis; Kerremans, 1902

= Neojulodis =

Genus of beetles

Neojulodis is a genus of beetles in the family Buprestidae, containing the following species:

- Neojulodis bequaerti (Kerremans, 1913)
- Neojulodis bouyeri Holm, 1986
- Neojulodis clermonti (Théry, 1934)
- Neojulodis hirta (Linnaeus, 1758)
- Neojulodis laticollis (Gahan, 1900)
- Neojulodis myrmido (Fairmaire, 1882)
- Neojulodis papillosa (Thunberg, 1827)
- Neojulodis picta (Thunberg, 1827)
- Neojulodis purpurescens Holm & Gussmann, 1991
- Neojulodis rufolimbata (Fairmaire, 1888)
- Neojulodis setosa (Thunberg, 1827)
- Neojulodis subcostata (Laporte, 1835)
- Neojulodis tomentosa (Olivier, 1790)
- Neojulodis vittipennis (Fåhraeus in Boheman, 1851)
