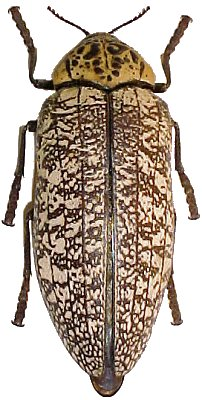

Scientific classification
- Kingdom: Animalia
- Phylum: Arthropoda
- Clade: Pancrustacea
- Class: Insecta
- Order: Coleoptera
- Suborder: Polyphaga
- Infraorder: Elateriformia
- Family: Buprestidae
- Subfamily: Julodinae
- Genus: Aaata; Semenov-Tian-Shanskij, 1906
- Species: A. finchi

Binomial name
- Aaata finchi (Waterhouse, 1884)

Synonyms
- Julodis finchi Waterhouse, 1884

= Aaata =

Genus of beetles

Aaata is a genus of beetles belonging to the family Buprestidae, containing the single species Aaata finchi. It is found in Balochistan and is one of the largest species of the family Buprestidae, reaching up to 7 cm (2.8 in) in length.
