= Charles Kerremans =

Belgian entomologist (1847–1915)

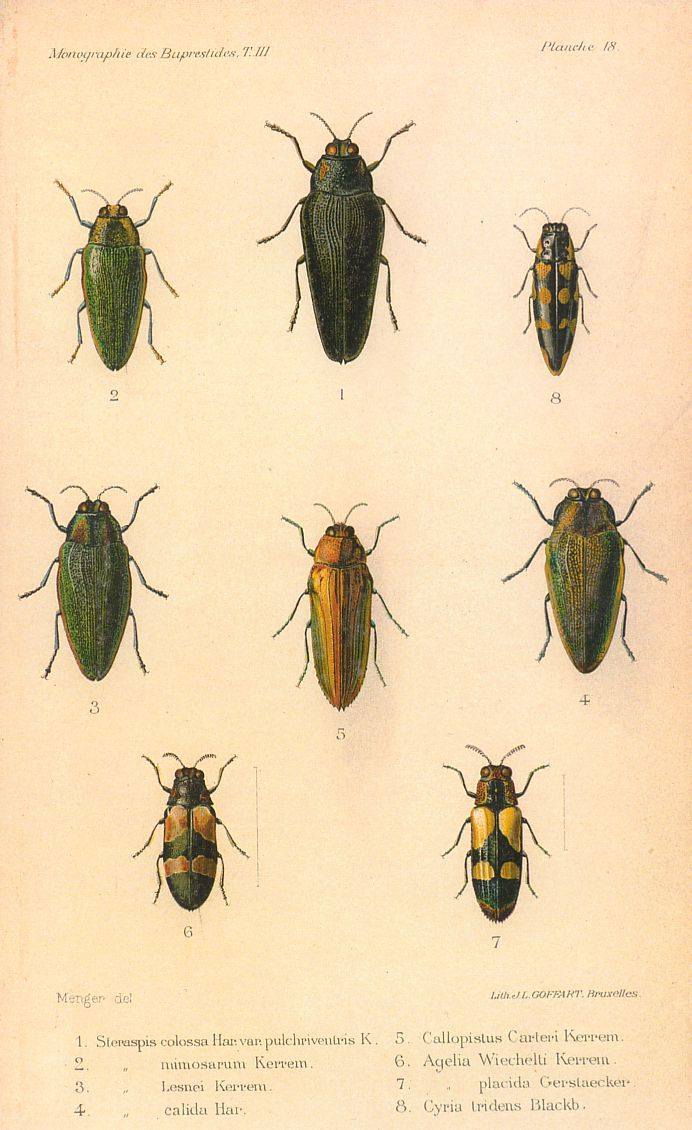
Plate from Kerremans' Monograph on Buprestids

Charles Kerremans (1847- 10 October 1915, Brussels) was a Belgian entomologist who specialised in Coleoptera, especially Buprestidae and Cicindelidae.

He was a Member of the Société entomologique de France.

== Publications ==
Partial list.

- 1893 Les Chrysobothrines d'Afrique Annales de la Société Entomologique de Belgique 37:232-260.
- 1896 Julodis atkinsoni. A new species of (Buprestid) Beetle Indian Museum Notes 4:48-49.
- 1898 Descriptions de Buprestides nouveaux de Madagascar (Col.)Bulletin de la Société Entomologique de France 1898:78-84.
- 1903 Coleoptera: Buprestidae.In: Wytsman P. Genera Insectorum XII.V. Verteneuil & L. Desmet, Bruxelles, 338 pp. & 4 pl.
- 1904 Faune Entomologique de l'Afrique Tropicale. Buprestidae Ann. Mus. Congo, Zool. S. III, T. 3, fasc. 1
- 1909 Catalogue raisonne des Buprestides du Congo Belge Ann. Mus. Congo, Zool. S. III, sect. II, T. 1, fasc. 2
- 1906-1913 Monographie des Buprestides Vol. I-VII – V. Dulan et Co., London.
- 1914 Troisième supplément au Catalogue des Buprestides du Congo Belge. Revue de Zoologique Africaine 3:347-364.
- 1914 Coleoptera, Buprestidae [of the Seychelles]. Transactions of the Linnean Society of London 16:377-378.
- 1914 Buprestidae. In: Dr. H. Schubotz (Ed.). Ergebnisse der Zweiten Deutschen Zentral-Afrika-Expedition 1910–1911 unter Führung Adolf Friedrichs, Herzogs zu Mecklenburg. Band I, Zoologie. Hamburgische Wissenschaftliche Stiftung, Leipzig, pp. 79–88.
- 1918 Coleoptera V: Buprestidae. In: Beiträge zur Kenntnis der Land-und Süßwasserfauna Deutsch Südwestafrikas. Volume 1, pp. 295–303.

His collections are shared between the Royal Museum for Central Africa, the Muséum national d'histoire naturelle and the Natural History Museum, London.
