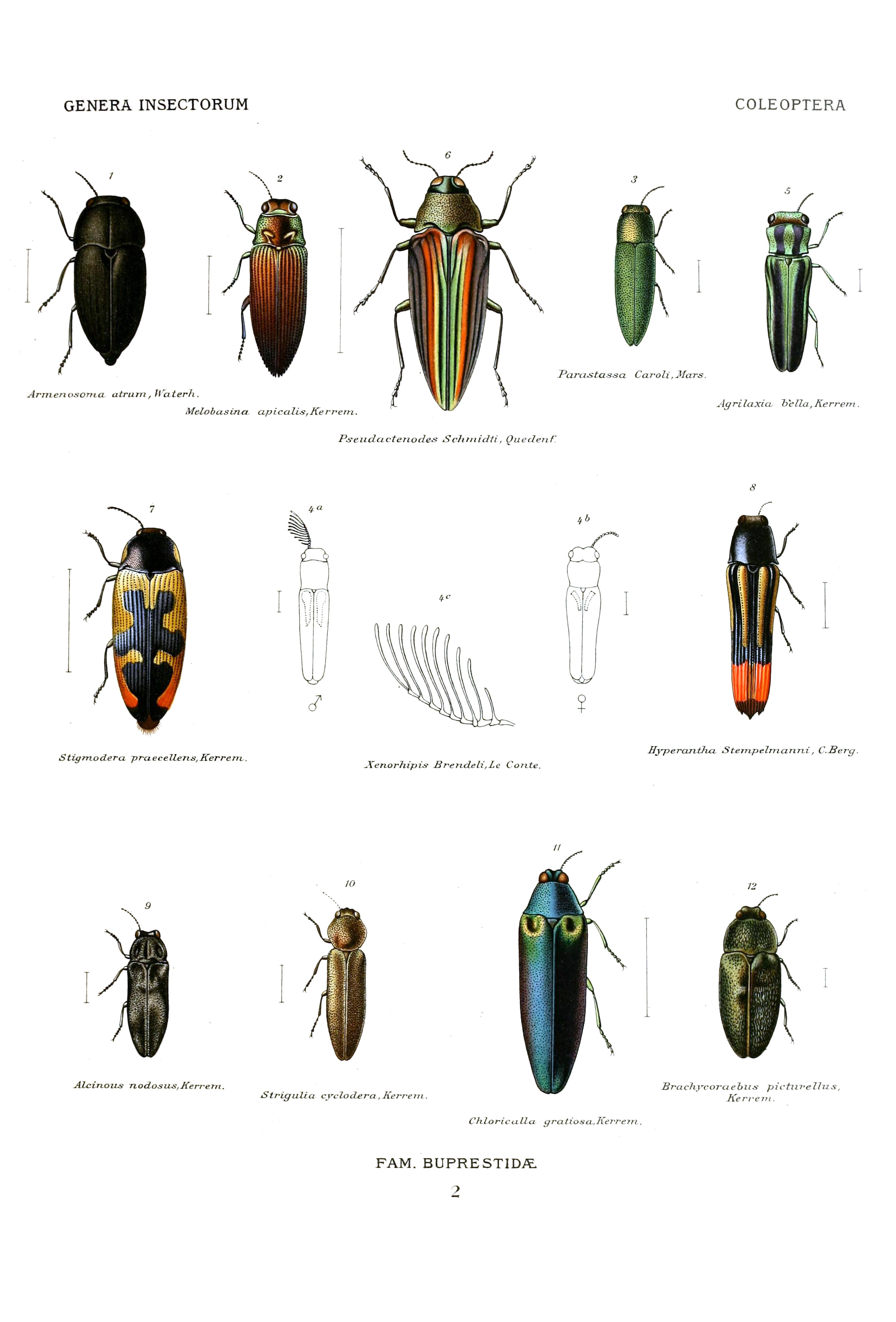
- Agrilinae (bottom row), Chrysochroinae (top row, left 3), and Buprestinae (others) from Genera Insectorum

Scientific classification
- Kingdom: Animalia
- Phylum: Arthropoda
- Clade: Pancrustacea
- Class: Insecta
- Order: Coleoptera
- Suborder: Polyphaga
- Infraorder: Elateriformia
- Superfamily: Buprestoidea
- Family: Buprestidae; Leach, 1815

Subfamilies
- Agrilinae; Buprestinae; Chrysochroinae; Galbellinae; Julodinae †Parathyreinae; Polycestinae (but see text)

= Buprestidae =

Buprestidae Temporal range: Middle Jurassic–recent

Family of insects

Buprestidae is a family of beetles known as jewel beetles or metallic wood-boring beetles because of their glossy, iridescent colors. Larvae of this family are known as flatheaded borers. The family is among the largest of the beetles, with some 15,500 species known in 775 genera. In addition, almost 100 fossil species have been described.

The larger and more spectacularly colored jewel beetles are highly prized by insect collectors. The elytra of some Buprestidae species have been traditionally used in beetlewing jewellery and decoration in certain countries such as India, Thailand, and Japan.

== Description and ecology ==
Shape is generally cylindrical or elongated to ovoid, with lengths ranging from 3 to 80 mm (0.12 to 3.15 in), although most species are under 20 mm (0.79 in). Catoxantha, Chrysaspis, Euchroma, and Megaloxantha contain the largest species. A variety of bright colors is known, often in complicated patterns. The iridescence common to these beetles is not due to pigments in the exoskeleton, but instead is caused by structural coloration, in which microscopic texture in their cuticle selectively reflects specific frequencies of light in particular directions. This is the same effect that makes a compact disc reflect multiple colors.

The larvae bore through roots, logs, stems, and leaves of various types of plants, ranging from trees to grasses. The wood-boring types generally favor dying or dead branches on otherwise-healthy trees, while a few types attack green wood; some of these are serious pests capable of killing trees and causing major economic damage, such as the invasive emerald ash borer. Some species are attracted to recently burned forests to lay their eggs. They can sense pine wood smoke from up to 50 miles away and can see infrared light, helping them to zero in as they get closer to a forest fire.

As with longhorn beetle larvae, most larval feeding in wood occurs in dying or dead trees, or close to injuries on living trees. Damage becomes significant only where adults remain in the area and keep ovipositing on the same trees repeatedly. The life history of wood-boring species is typically a few years, but some exceedingly long life cycles have been reported under adverse conditions. Full-grown larvae, up to 25 mm long, have the anterior part of the body characteristically flattened, and much broader than the rest.

== Systematics ==
Jewel beetle classification is not yet robustly established, although five or six main lineages apparently exist, which may be considered subfamilies, possibly with one or two being raised to families in their own right. Some other systems define up to 14 subfamilies.

The earliest unambiguous members of the family are known from the Middle Jurassic, around 160 million years ago, earlier claimed records from the Triassic based on isolated elytra are not definitive.

=== Subfamilies and selected genera ===
The commonly accepted subfamilies, with some representative genera, are:

Agrilinae – cosmopolitan, with most taxa occurring in the Northern Hemisphere

- Aaaaba Bellamy, 2013
- Agrilus Curtis, 1825
- Anodontodora Obenberger, 1931
- Asymades Kerremans, 1893
- Brachys Dejean, 1833
- Chalcophlocteis Obenberger, 1924
- Discoderoides Théry, 1936
- Entomogaster Saunders, 1871
- Ethiopoeus Bellamy, 2008
- Madecorformica Bellamy, 2008
- Meliboeus Deyrolle, 1864
- Pachyschelus Solier, 1833
- Paracylindromorphus Thery, 1930
- Paradorella Obenberger, 1923
- Pseudokerremansia Bellamy & Holm, 1985
- Strandietta Obenberger, 1931
- †Burmagrilus Jiang et al. 2021 Burmese amber, Myanmar, Cenomanian

Buprestinae – cosmopolitan

- Agrilozodes Thery, 1927
- Anthaxia Eschscholtz, 1829
- Bubastoides
- Buprestis
- Calodema – found only in Australia and New Guinea; usually in rain forests
- Castiarina – about 500 species, found only in Australia and New Guinea, previously considered a subgenus of Stigmodera
- Chrysobothris
- Cobosella
- Colobogaster
- Conognatha
- Eurythyrea
- Hiperantha
- Metaxymorpha – found only in Australia, New Guinea, and Indonesia; usually in rain forests
- Stigmodera – 7 species remain here
- Temognatha – About 83-85 species, found only in Australia and New Guinea, previously considered a subgenus of Stigmodera

Chrysochroinae

- Capnodis
- Chalcophora
- Chrysochroa
- Chrysodema Laporte & Gory, 1835 (= Cyalithoides)
- Euchroma
- Halecia
- Lampetis Dejean, 1833 – sometimes included in the tribe Psilopterini, but actually not very close to Psiloptera (tentatively placed here)
- Lampropepla
- Perotis
- Psiloptera (tentatively placed here)

Galbellinae

- Galbella

Julodinae

- Aaata
- Amblysterna
- Julodella
- Julodis
- Neojulodis
- Sternocera

Polycestinae

- Acmaeodera

== Gallery ==
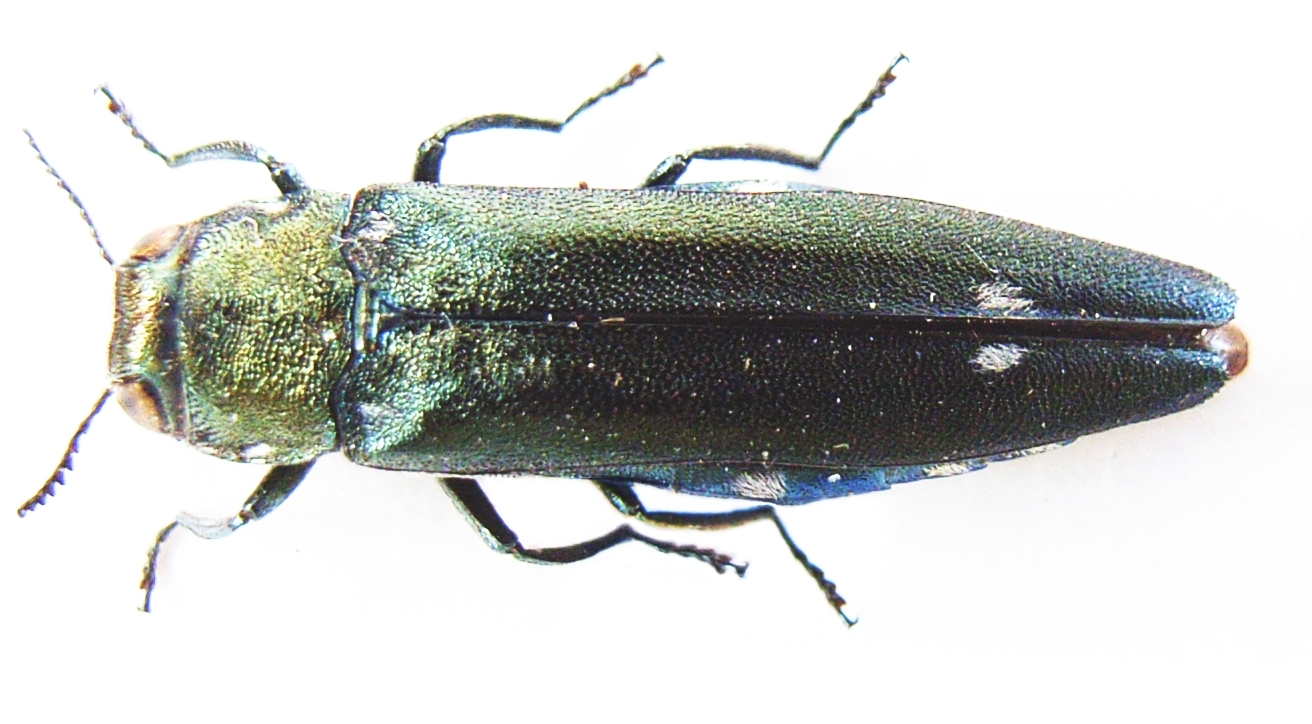
Oak splendour beetle (Agrilus biguttatus, Agrilinae)

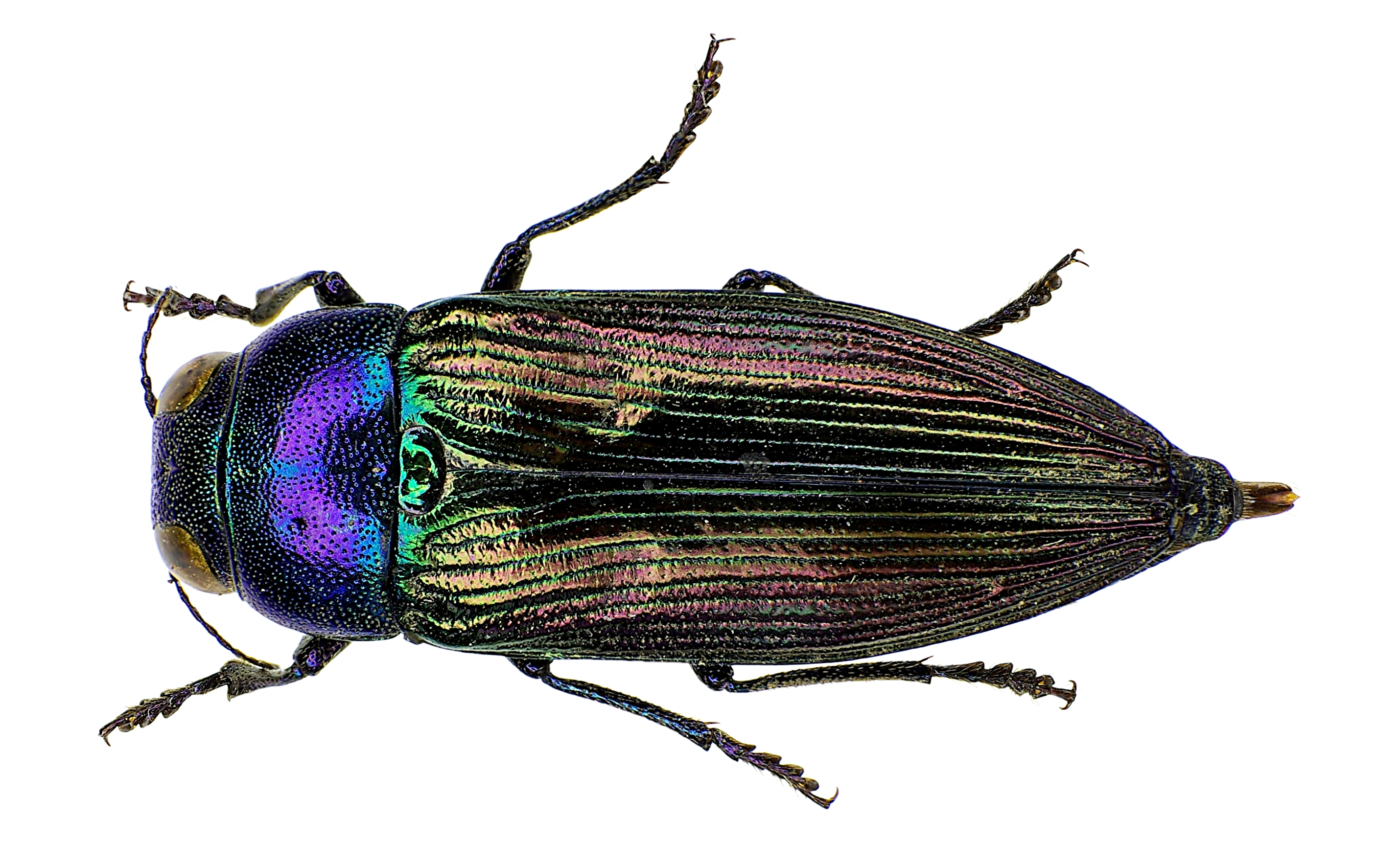
Eurythyrea austriaca (Buprestinae)

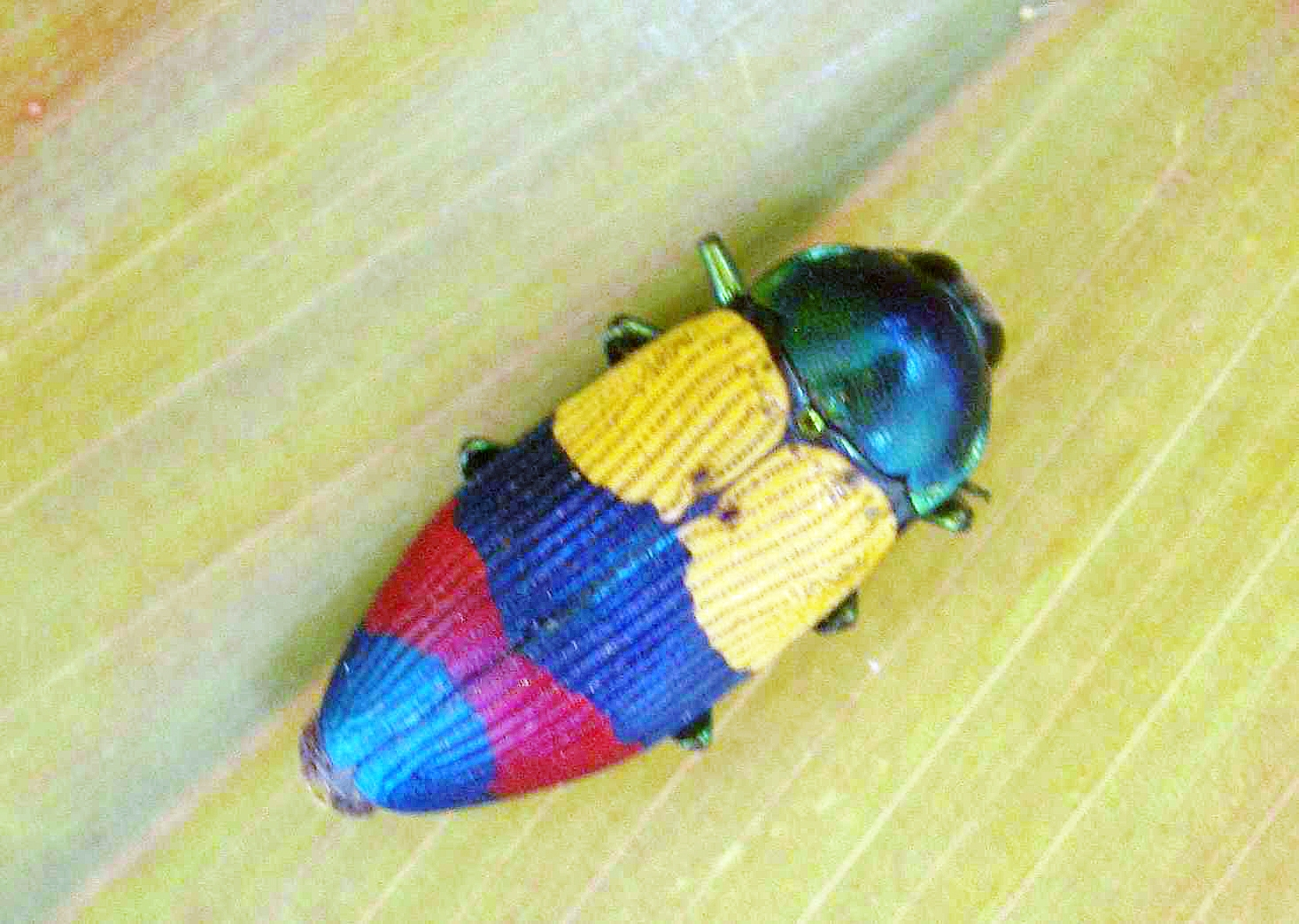
Temognatha alternata, a Buprestinae 2.6cm long from Cooktown, Australia

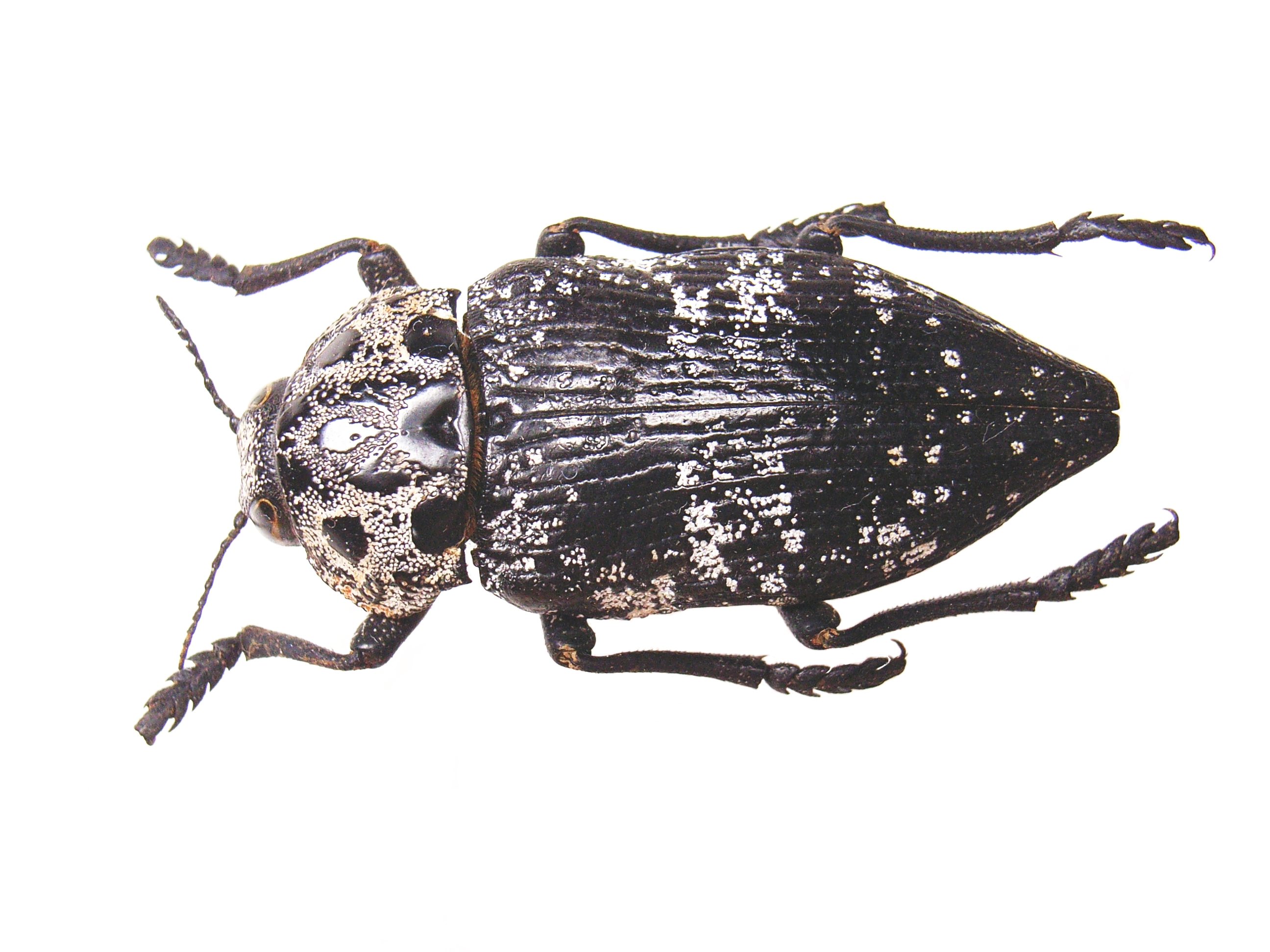
Capnodis cariosa (Chrysochroinae)

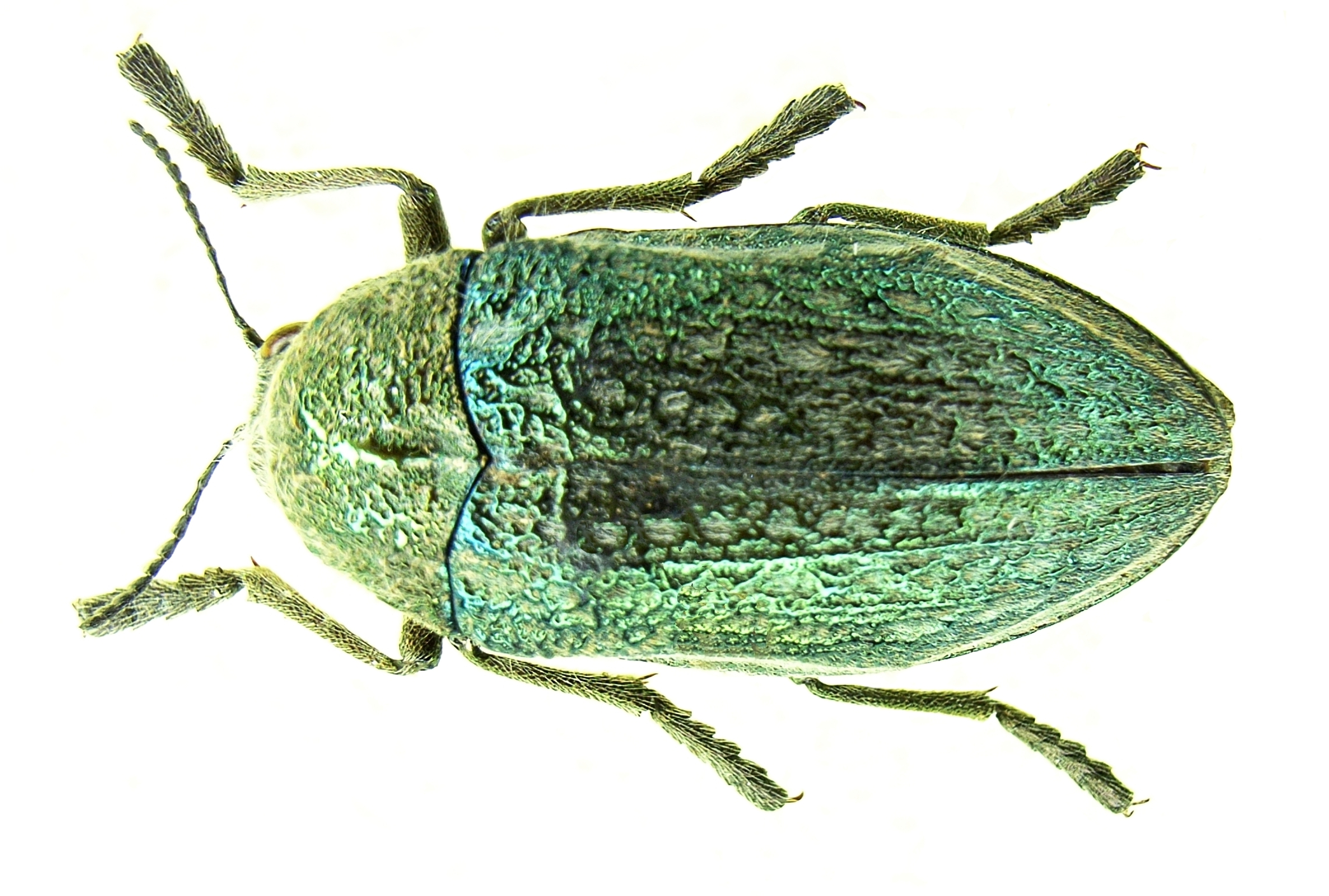
Julodis ehrenbergii specimen from Greece (Julodinae)

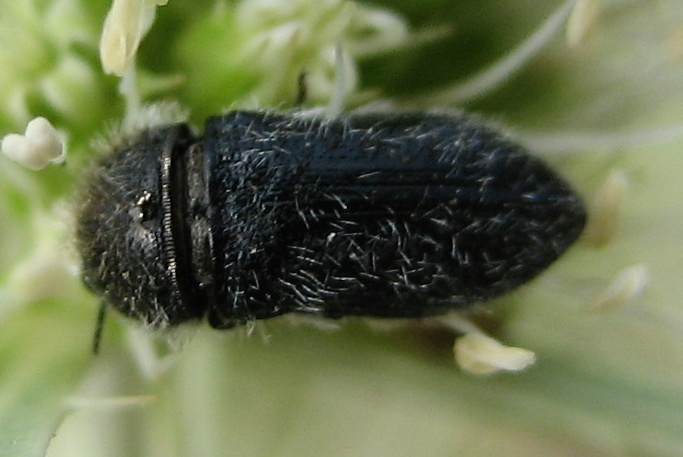
Acmaeodera sp. (Polycestinae)

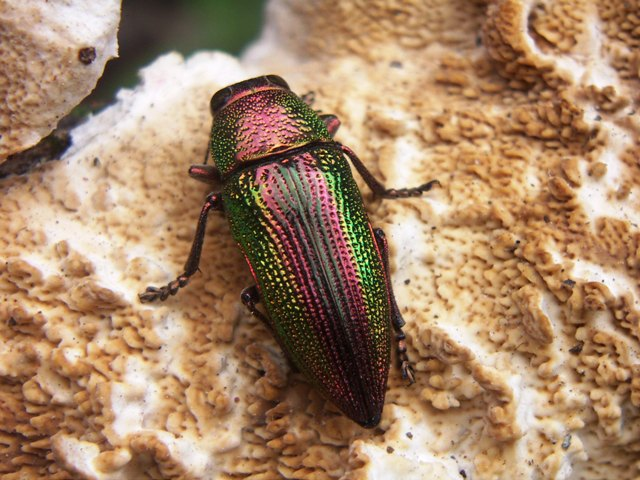
Unidentified species from Pune (India)

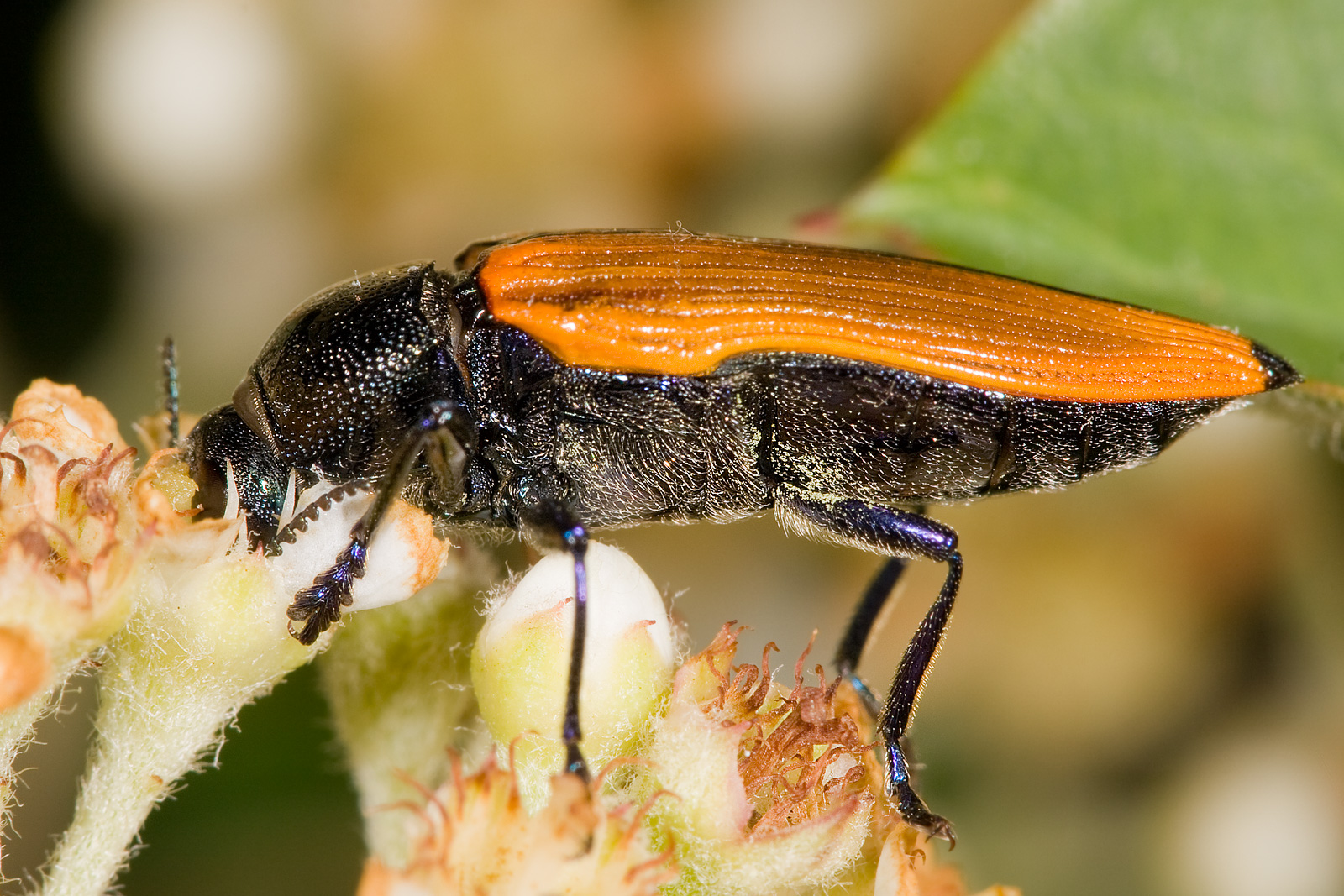
Unidentified species from Swifts Creek (Victoria, Australia)

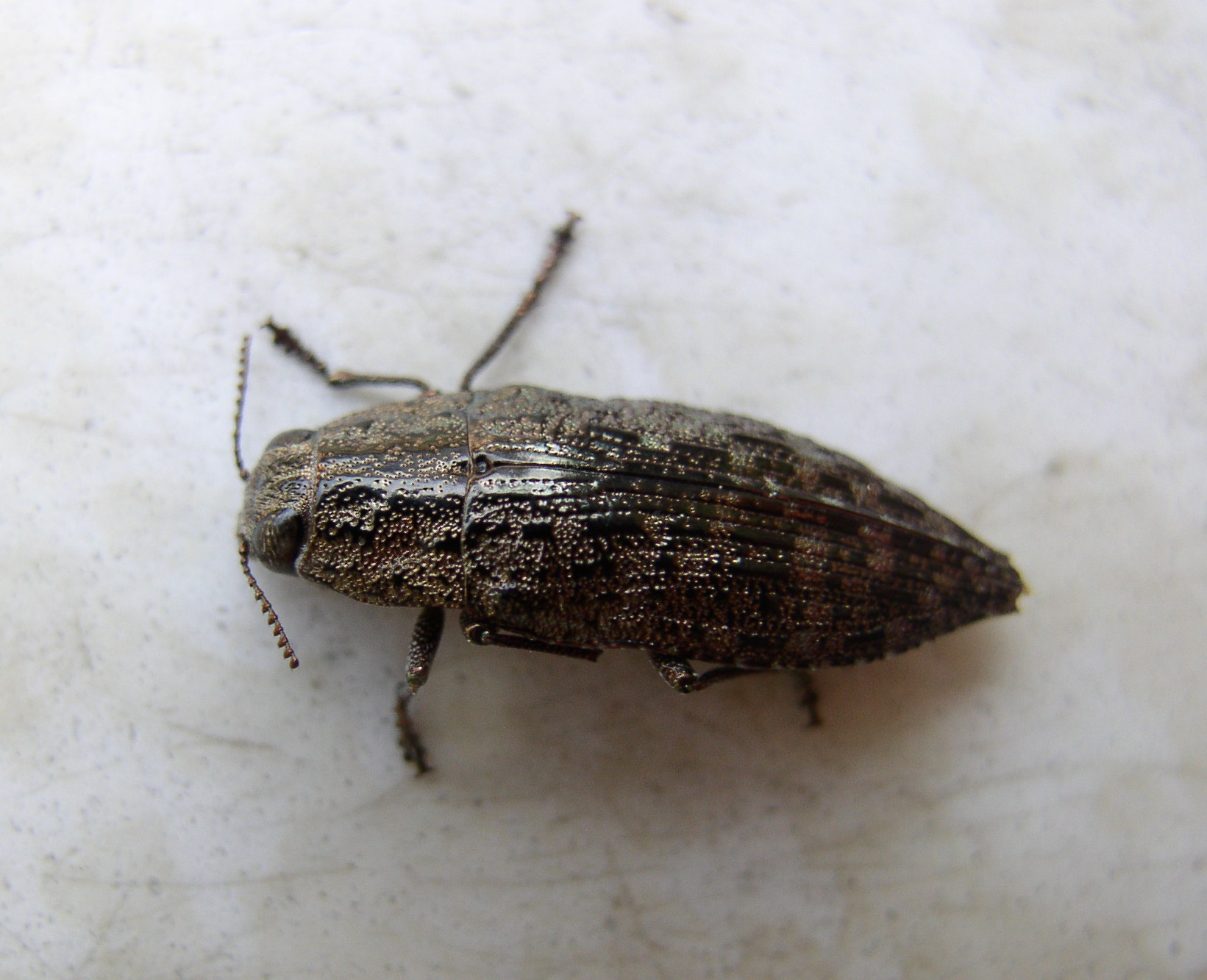
Dicerca obscura (subfamilia Chrysochroinae), North America

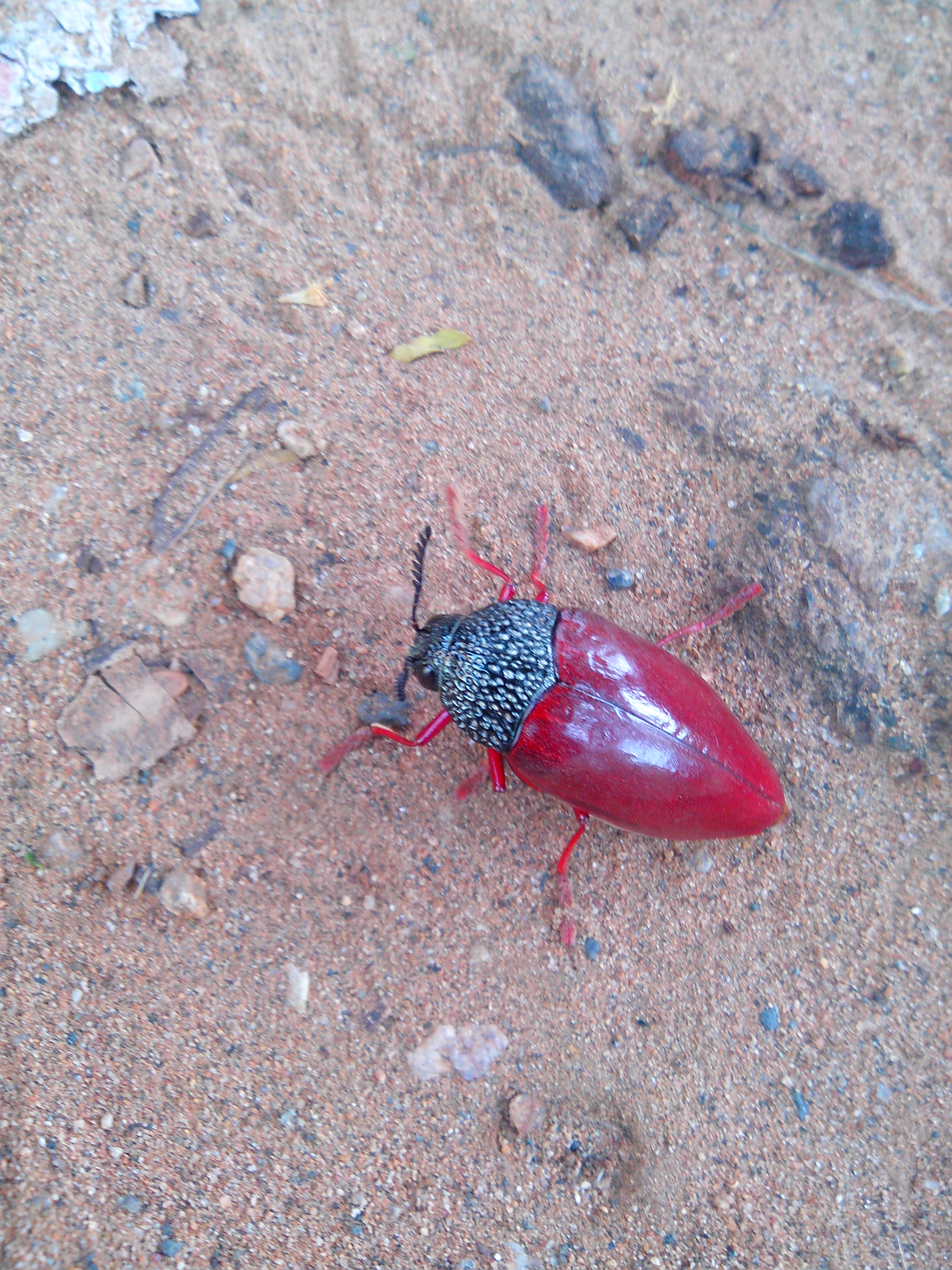
Sternocera sp., Tamil Nadu

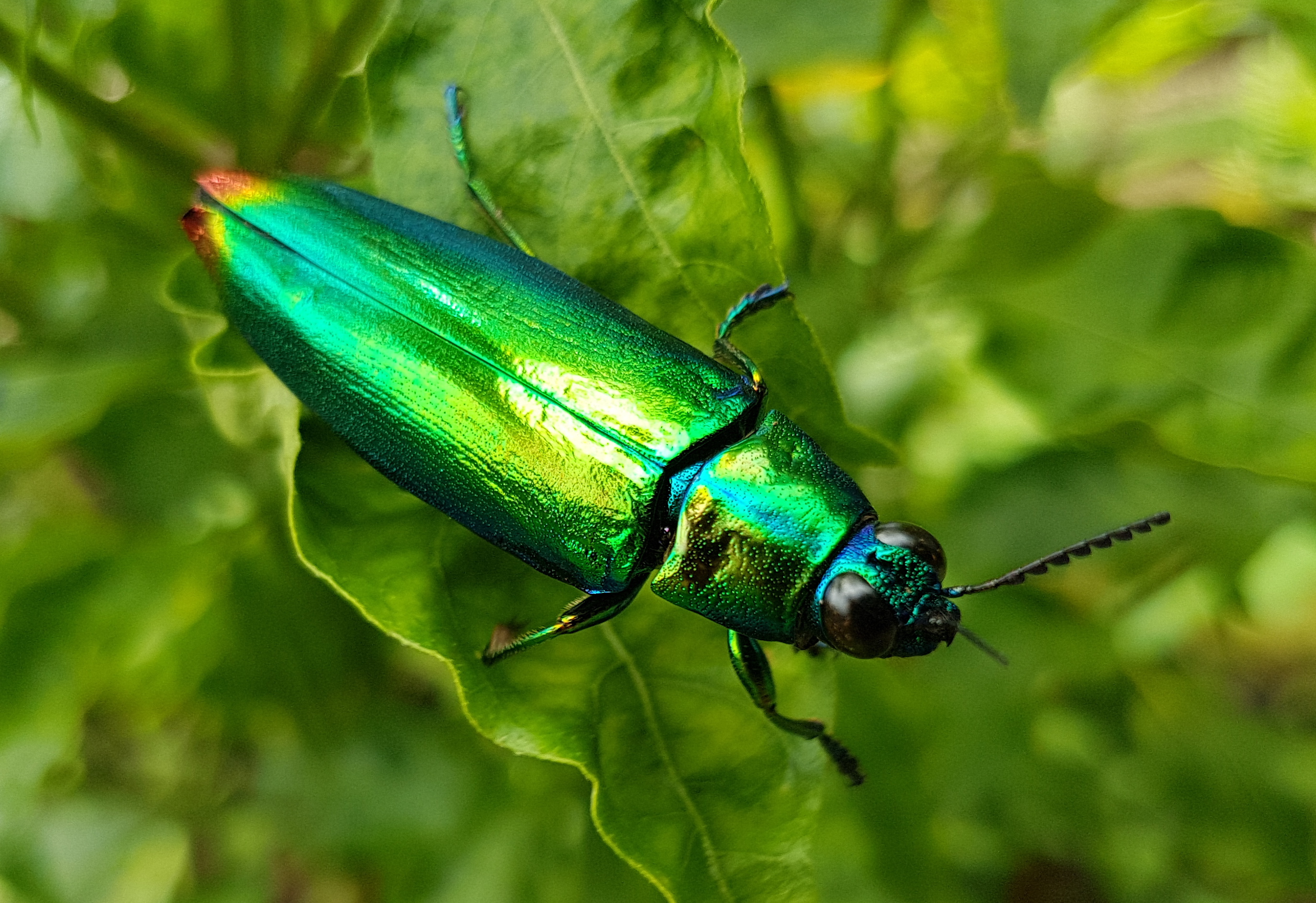
Chrysochroa fulminans from Mindanao, Philippines

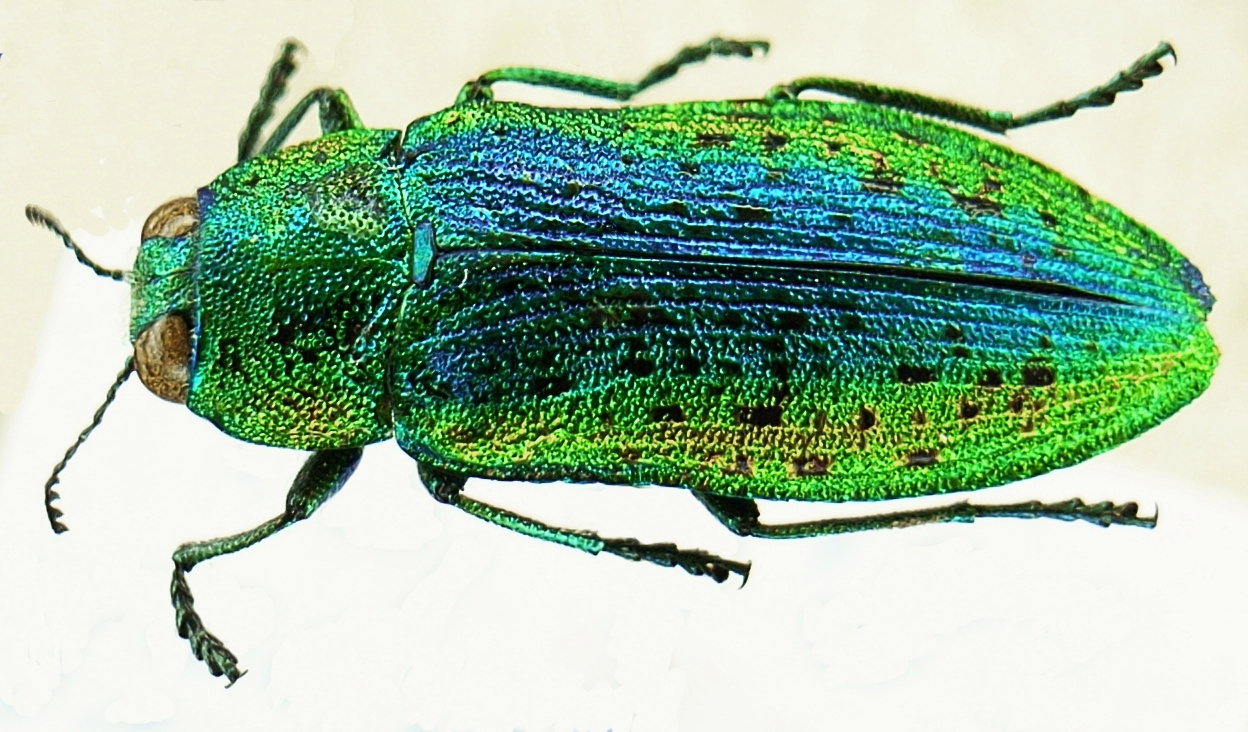
Lamprodila rutilans

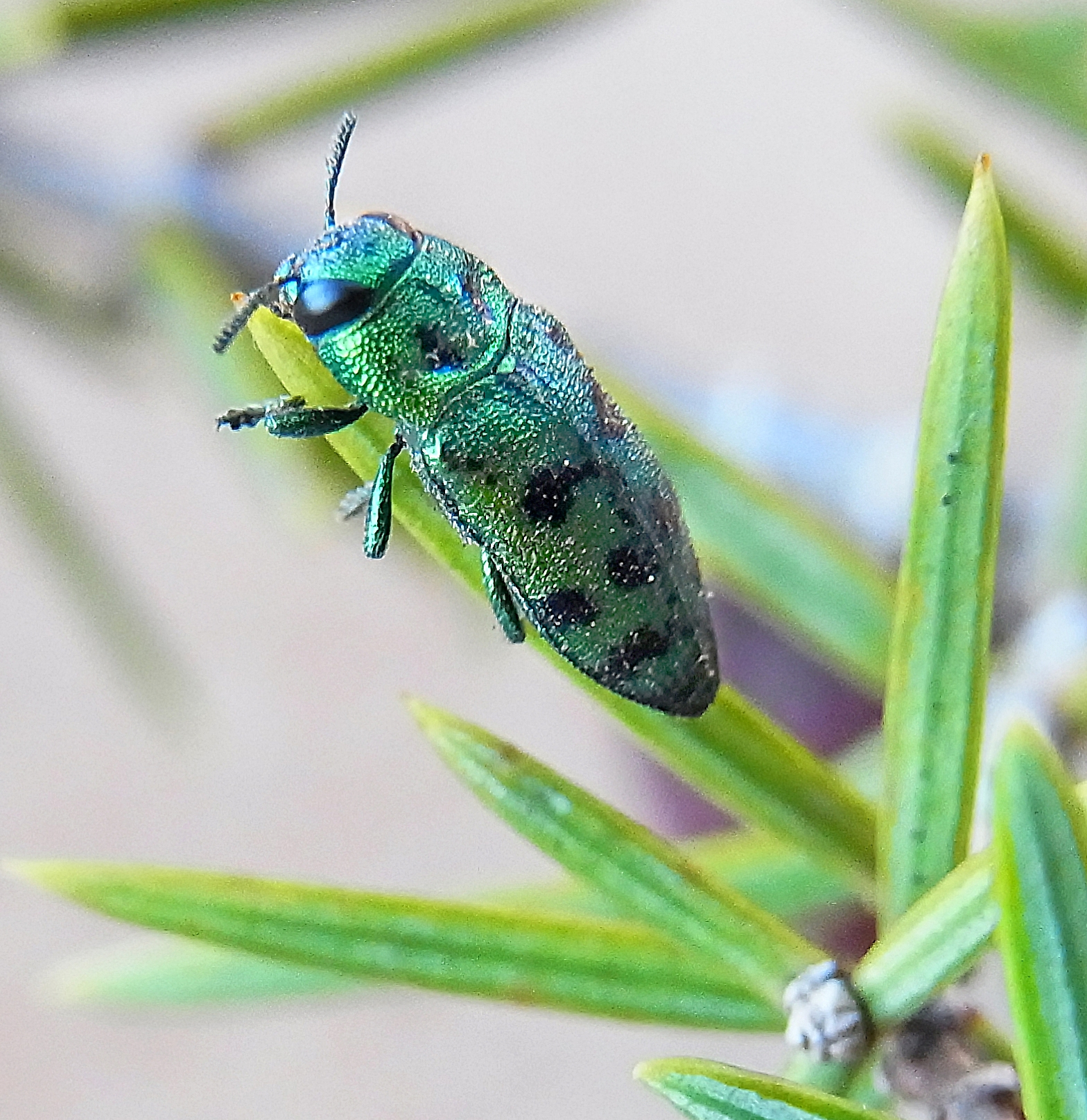
Lamprodila festiva in Spain

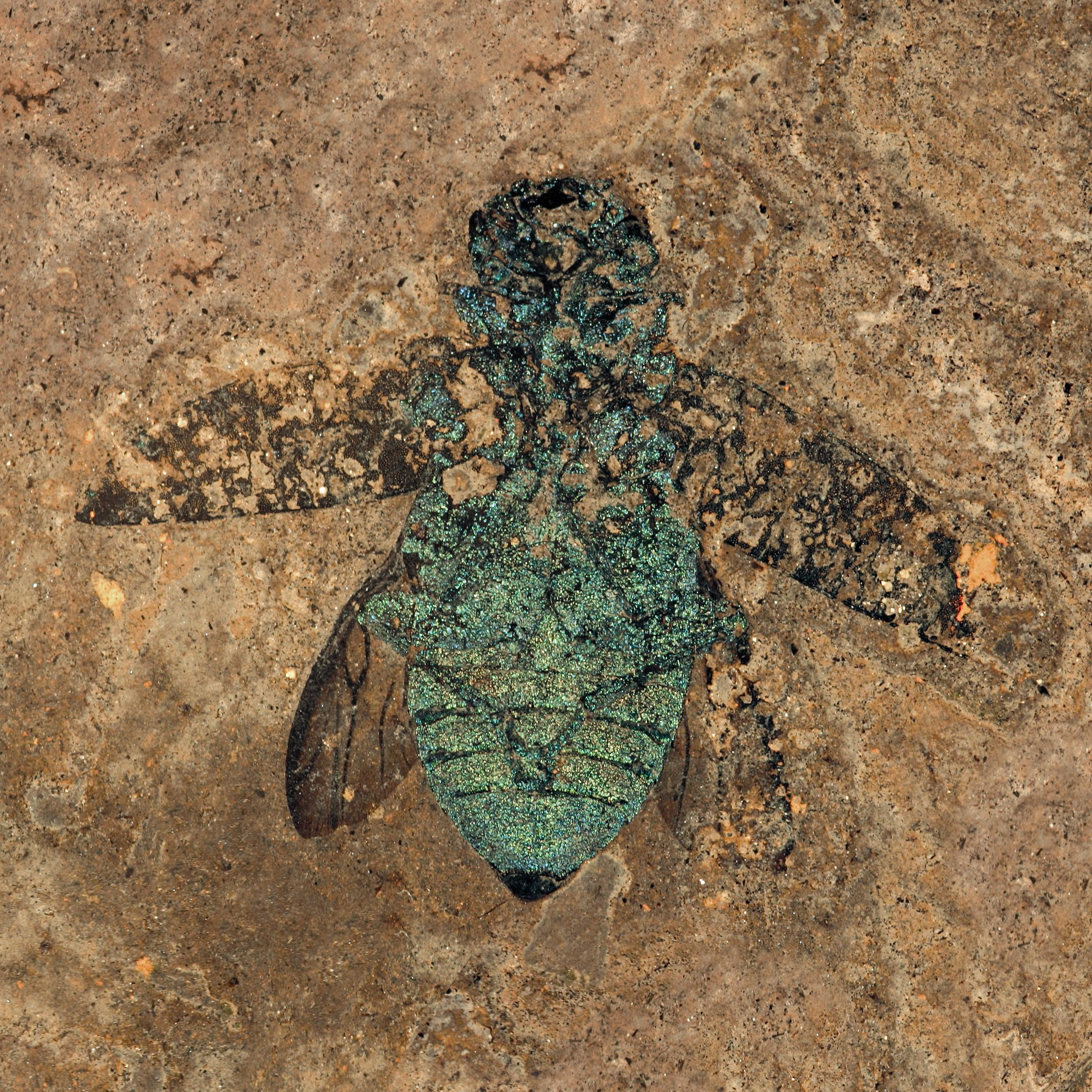
Fossil jewel beetle from the Eocene, found in the Messel Pit (Germany)

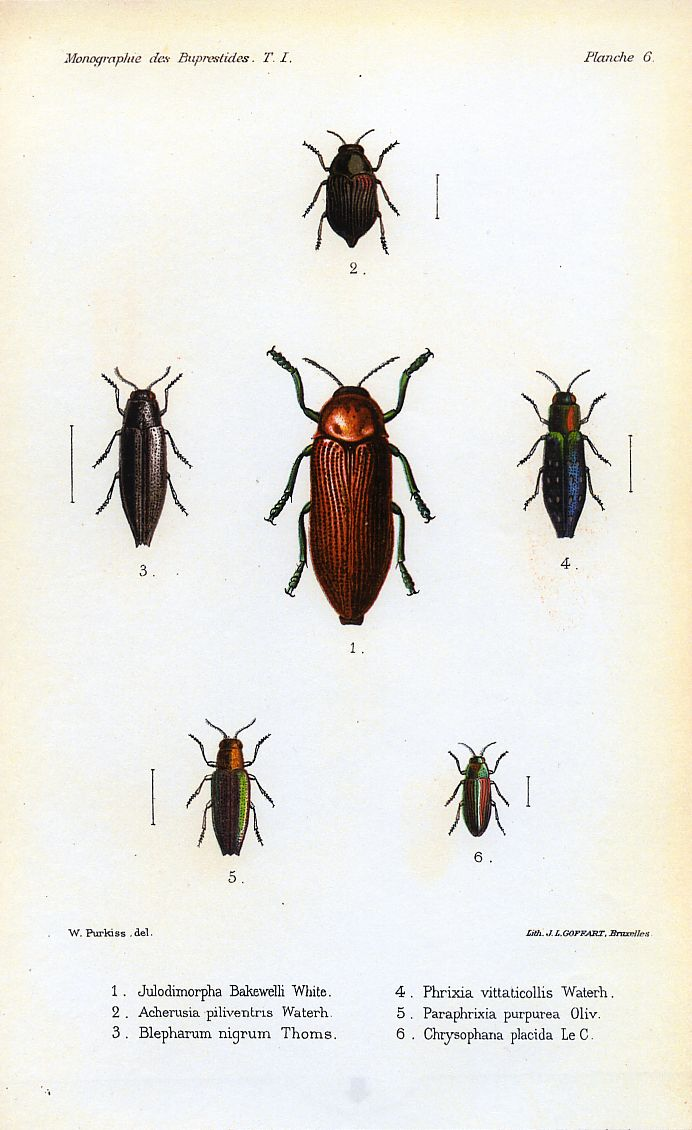
Buprestinae (center right and lower left), Julodinae (center) and Polycestinae (others) from Charles Kerremans' Monographie des Buprestides

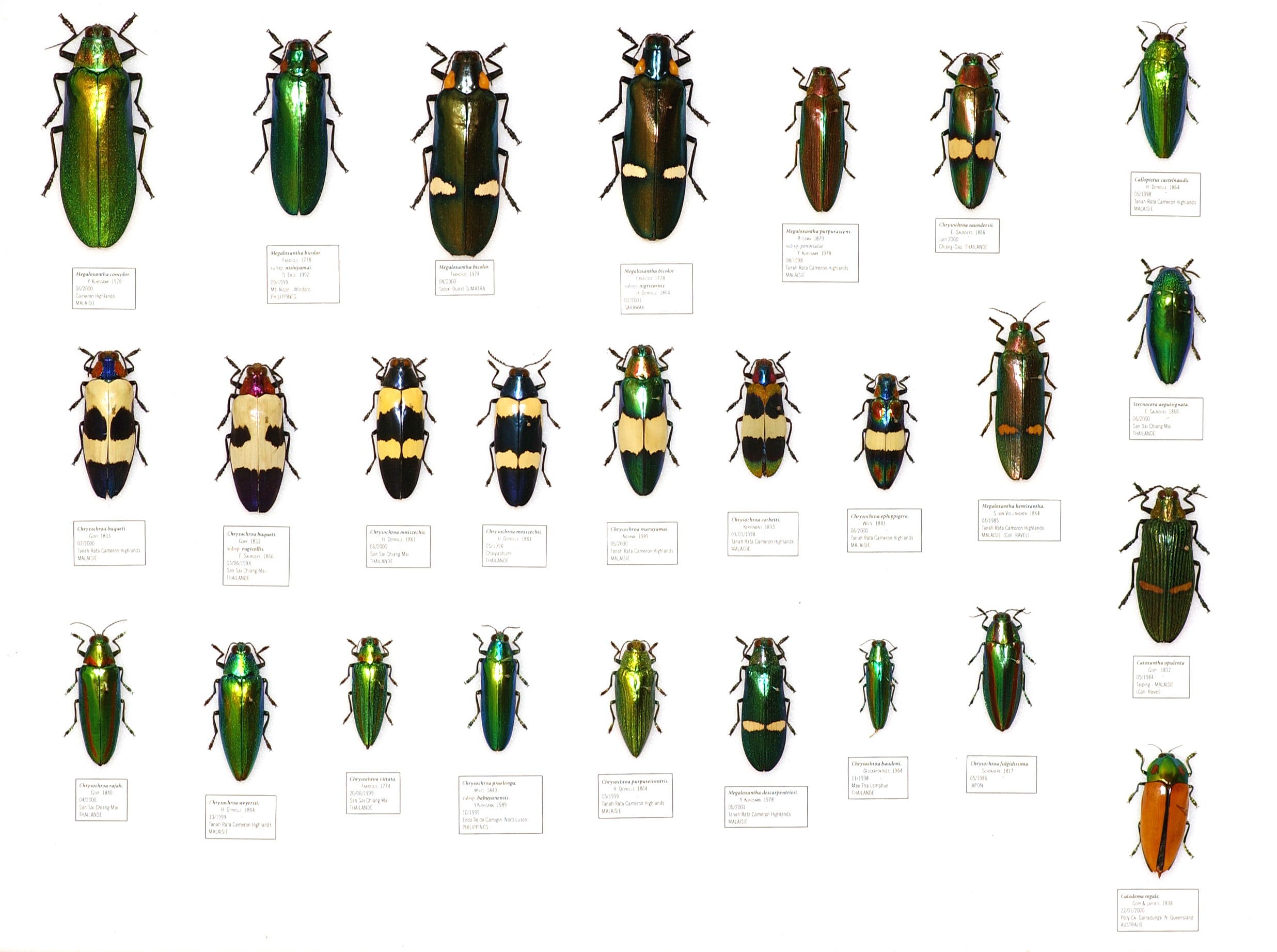
Collection of Buprestidae from Southeast Asia in Musée d'Histoire Naturelle de Lille

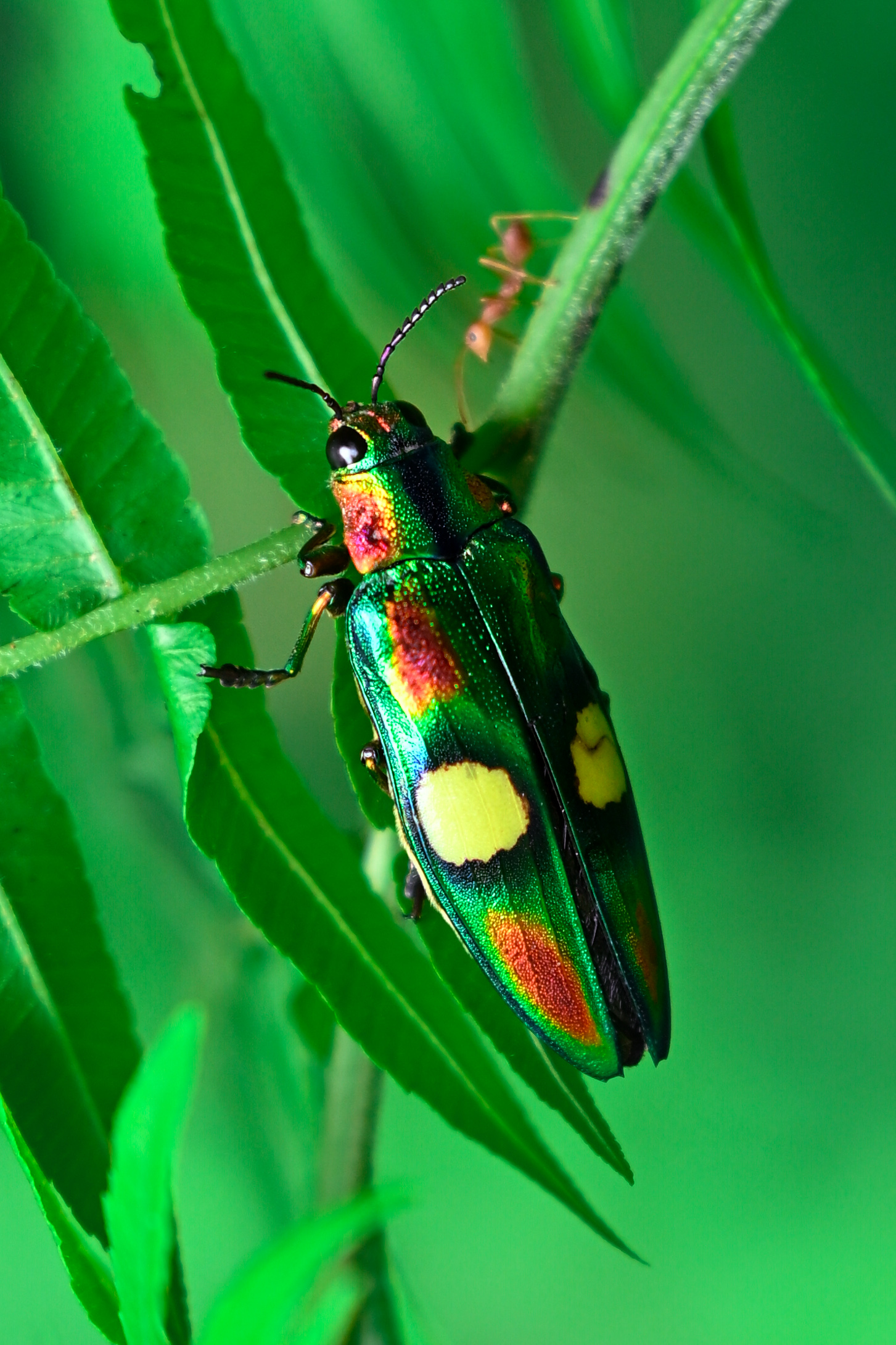
Jewel beetle found in the Soraipung Range, Dehing Patkai National Park, Assam (India)
