= Jan Obenberger =

Czech entomologist (1892–1964)

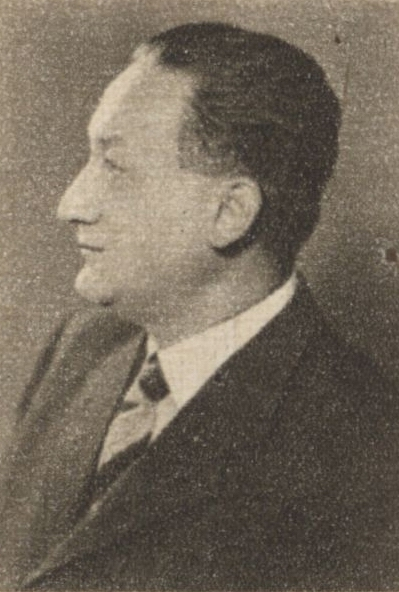
Jan Obenberger in 1944

Jan Obenberger ( May 15, 1892 in Prague – April 30, 1964) was a Czechoslovak entomologist of German descent.

He was Professor of Zoology at the Charles University in Prague. He was a specialist in Buprestidae. Jan Obenberger was very skilled at colour illustration.

== Works ==
- Obenberger, J. 1928. De generis Aphanisticus Latr. (Col. Bupr.) speciebus aethiopicis. Africké druhy rodu Aphanisticus Latr. Acta Entomologica Musaei Nationalis Pragae 6:77-98.
- Obenberger, J. 1935. De regionis aethiopicae speciebus generis Agrili novis (Col. Bupr.). Nové druhy krasců z rodu Agrilus z aethiopské oblasti. Acta Entomologica Musaei Nationalis Pragae 13:149-210.
- Obenberger, J. 1937. Révision des espèces exotiques du genre Trachs Fabr. du continent africain. Přehled exotických druhů rodu Trachys africké pevniny. Acta Entomologica Musei Nationalis Pragae 15:46-101.
- Obenberger, J. 1945. Nový druh rodu Promeliboeus Obenb. (Col. Bupr.). De generis Promeliboeus Obenb. species nova (Col. Bupr.). Acta Entomologica Musaei Nationalis Pragae 23:159-160.

Contributions to Coleopterorum Catalogus. W. Junk, Berlin

- Obenberger, J. 1926. Pars 84. Buprestidae I. IN: S. Schenkling (ed.), Coleopterorum Catalogus. W. Junk, Berlin, pp. 1–212.
- Obenberger, J. 1930. Pars 111. Buprestidae II. IN: S. Schenkling (ed.), Coleopterorum Catalogus. W. Junk, Berlin, pp. 213–568.
- Obenberger, J. 1934. Pars 132. Buprestidae III. IN: S. Schenkling (ed.), Coleopterorum Catalogus. W. Junk, Berlin, pp. 569–781.
- Obenberger, J. 1935. Pars 143. Buprestidae IV. IN: S. Schenkling (ed.), Coleopterorum Catalogus. W. Junk, Berlin, pp. 782–934.
- Obenberger, J. 1936. Pars 152. Buprestidae V. IN: S. Schenkling (ed.), Coleopterorum Catalogus. W. Junk, Berlin, pp. 935–1246.
- Obenberger, J. 1937. Pars 157. Buprestidae VI. IN: S. Schenkling (ed.), Coleopterorum Catalogus. W. Junk, Berlin, pp. 1247–1714.
