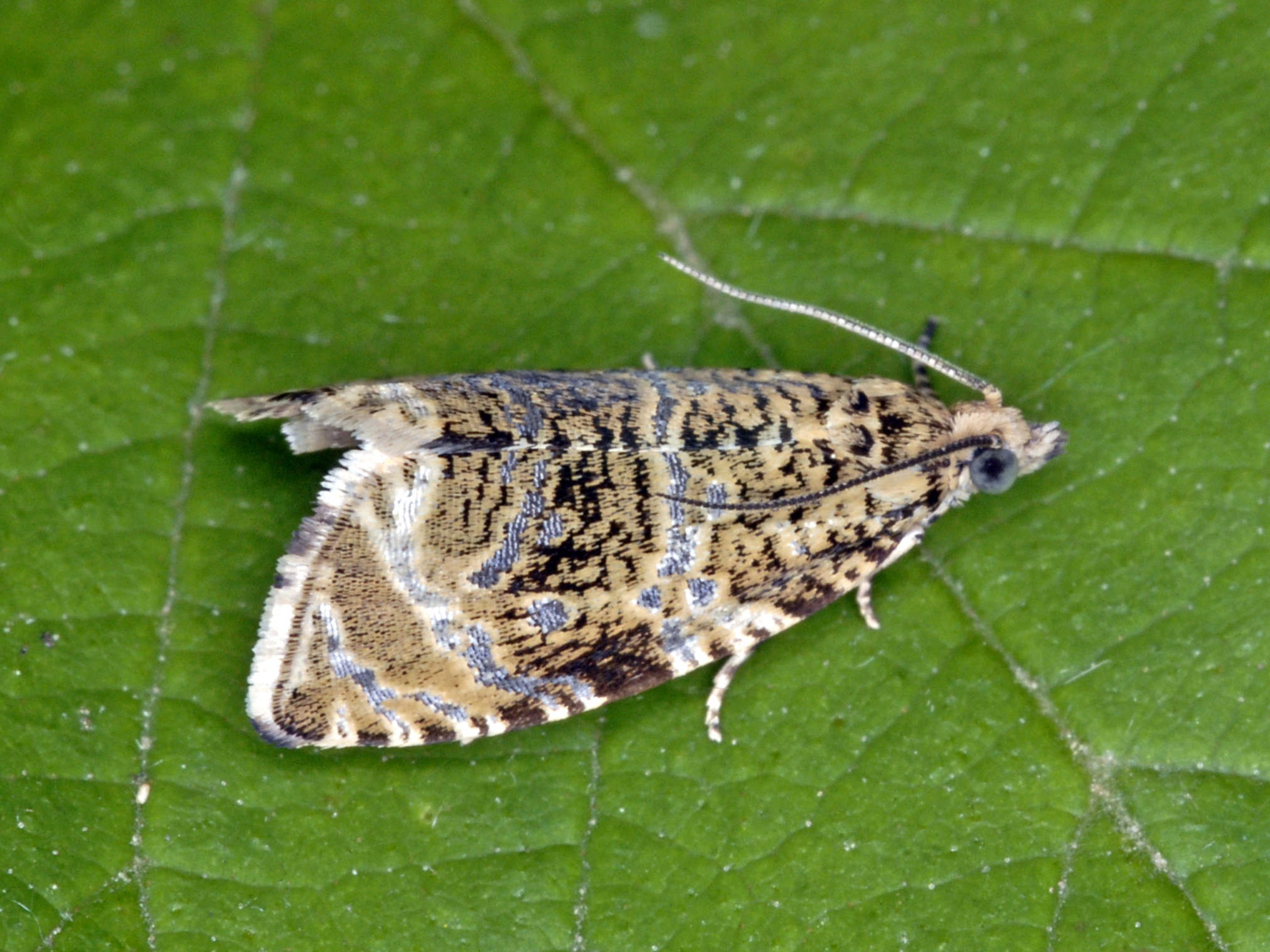

Scientific classification
- Kingdom: Animalia
- Phylum: Arthropoda
- Clade: Pancrustacea
- Class: Insecta
- Order: Lepidoptera
- Family: Tortricidae
- Genus: Syricoris
- Species: S. lacunana

Binomial name
- Syricoris lacunana (Denis & Schiffermüller, 1775)

Synonyms
- Numerous, see text

= Syricoris lacunana =

Species of moth

Syricoris lacunana, the dark strawberry tortrix, is a small moth species of the family Tortricidae. It is found in the Palearctic realm.

Like its congeners, it is sometimes still placed in the genus Celypha.

== Synonyms ==
Junior synonyms of this species are:

- Argyroploce lacunana var. lucivaganoides Strand, 1920
- Argyroploce symmathetes Caradja, 1916
- Celypha lacunana (Denis & Schiffermüller, 1775)
- Loxoterma lacunana (Denis & Schiffermüller, 1775)
- Olethreutes pallidana Hauder, 1918
- Orthotaenia alternana Curtis, 1831
- Pyralis decussana Fabricius, 1775
- Penthina lacunana var. hoffmanniana Teich, 1890
- Sericoris herbana Guenée, 1845
- Sericoris lacunana f. fuscoapicalis Strand, 1901
- Sericoris rooana Degraff, 1861
- Syricoris alticola Gibeaux, 1990
- Syricoris hoffmanniana (Teich, 1890)
- Syricoris lacunana alticola Gibeaux, 1990
- Syricoris lucivaganoides (Strand, 1920)
- Tortrix lacunana Denis & Schiffermüller, 1775

== Description ==
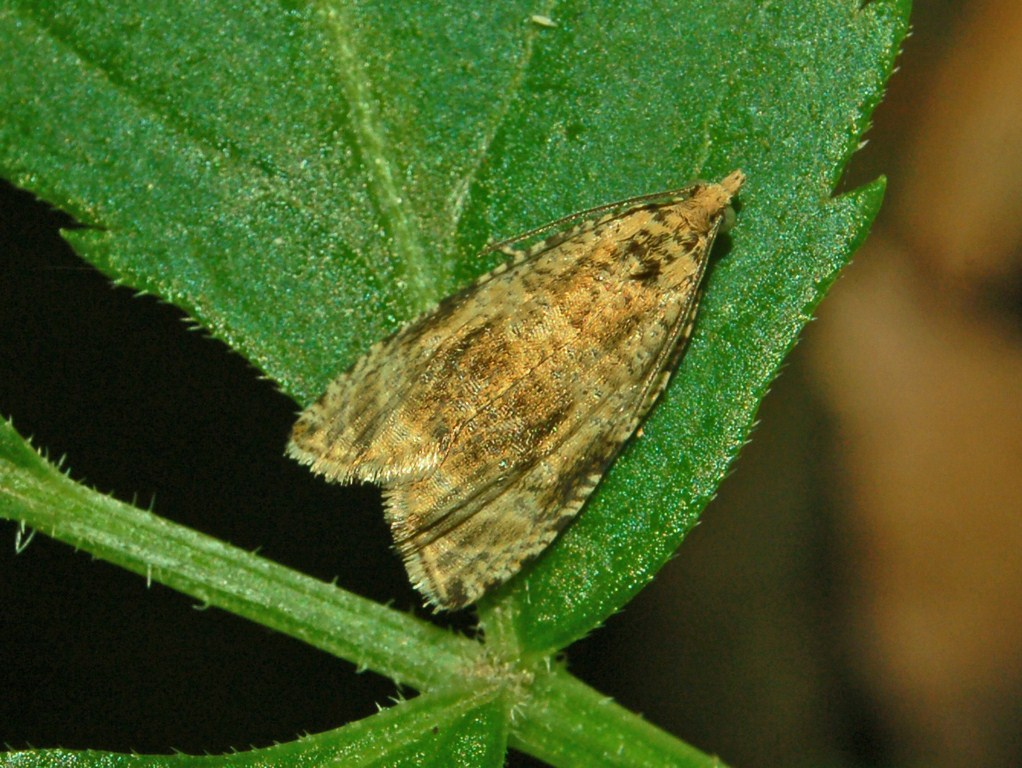
Dorsal view

Syricoris lacunana has a wingspan of 16–18 millimetres (0.63–0.71 in). The forewings show various shades of gray brown crossed by a few thin irregular silvery lines. The caterpillars can reach a length of about 15 millimetres (0.59 in) and are coloured brown to dark brown. These moths are quite variable and can be confused with some other species (Olethreutes obsoletana, Celypha doubledayana, Orthotaenia undulana). Julius von Kennel provides a full description.

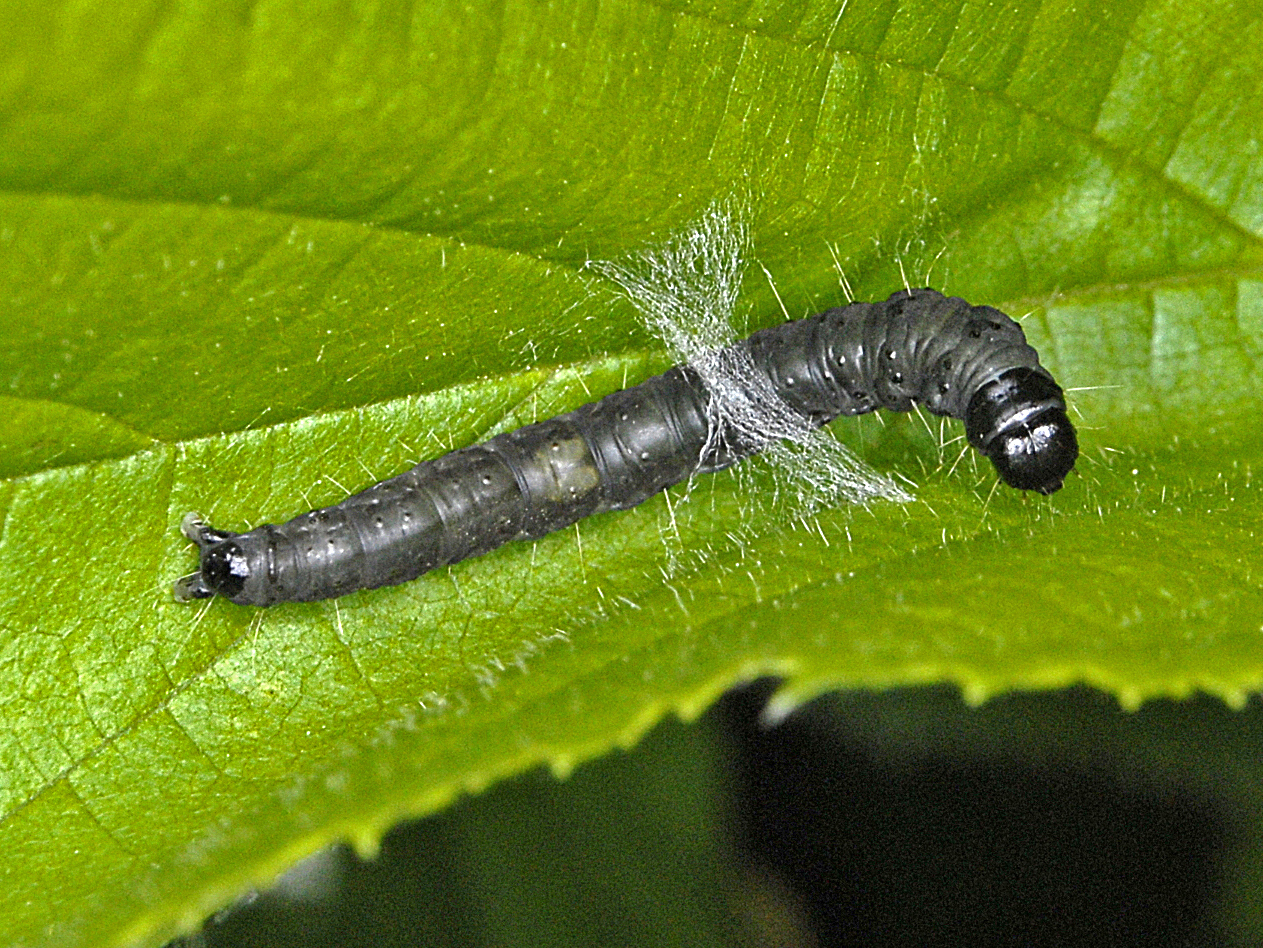
Caterpillar

== Biology ==
The adult moths are active at dusk and fly from late April to September in the temperate part of their range (e.g. Belgium and the Netherlands). The caterpillars can be encountered from April to September.

It is a univoltine species. The larvae are polyphagous, feeding on various herbaceous plants (Daucus spec., Succisa spec., Ononis sp., Mentha sp., Caltha sp., Ranunculus sp., Inula sp., Cirsium sp., Chrysanthemum sp., Lysimachia sp., Chenopodium sp.. Urtica sp., Artemisia sp., Filipendula spec., Fragaria sp., Sanguisorba sp., Epilobium sp., Rubus sp., Salix sp., Betula sp., Ligustrum sp.. Larix spec., Picea sp.).

== Distribution ==
It is present all over Europe, in most northern countries in the east Palearctic realm, and in the Near East.

== Habitat ==
This very common species can be found in hedgerows, fields and woodland edges.
