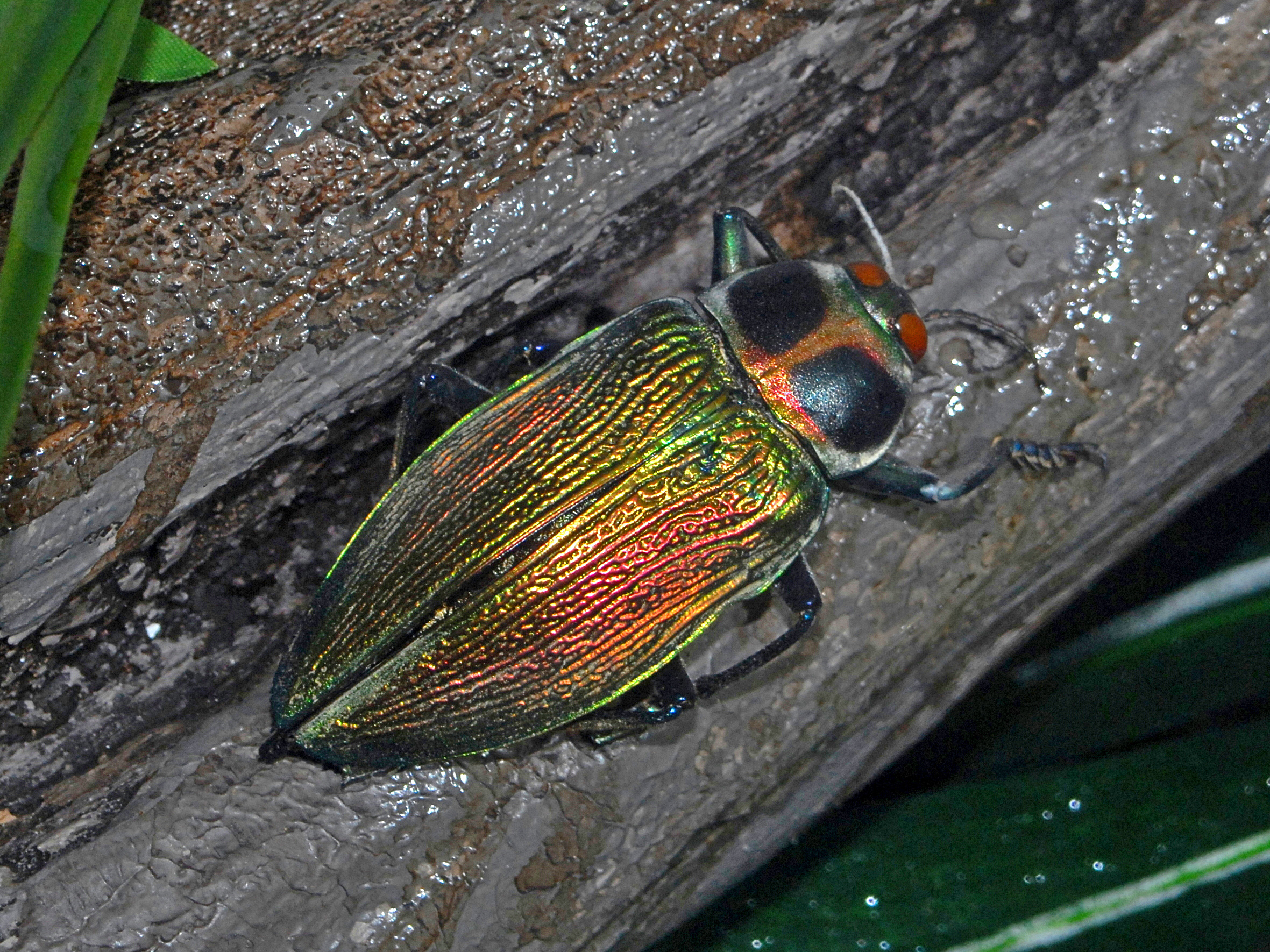
- Euchroma giganteum - ceiba borer

Scientific classification
- Kingdom: Animalia
- Phylum: Arthropoda
- Clade: Pancrustacea
- Class: Insecta
- Order: Coleoptera
- Suborder: Polyphaga
- Infraorder: Elateriformia
- Family: Buprestidae
- Subfamily: Chrysochroinae
- Tribe: Paraleptodemini
- Genus: Euchroma; Dejean, 1833
- Species: E. giganteum

Binomial name
- Euchroma giganteum ( Linnaeus, 1758)

Synonyms
- Buprestis gigantea Linnaeus, 1758

= Euchroma giganteum =

Species of beetle

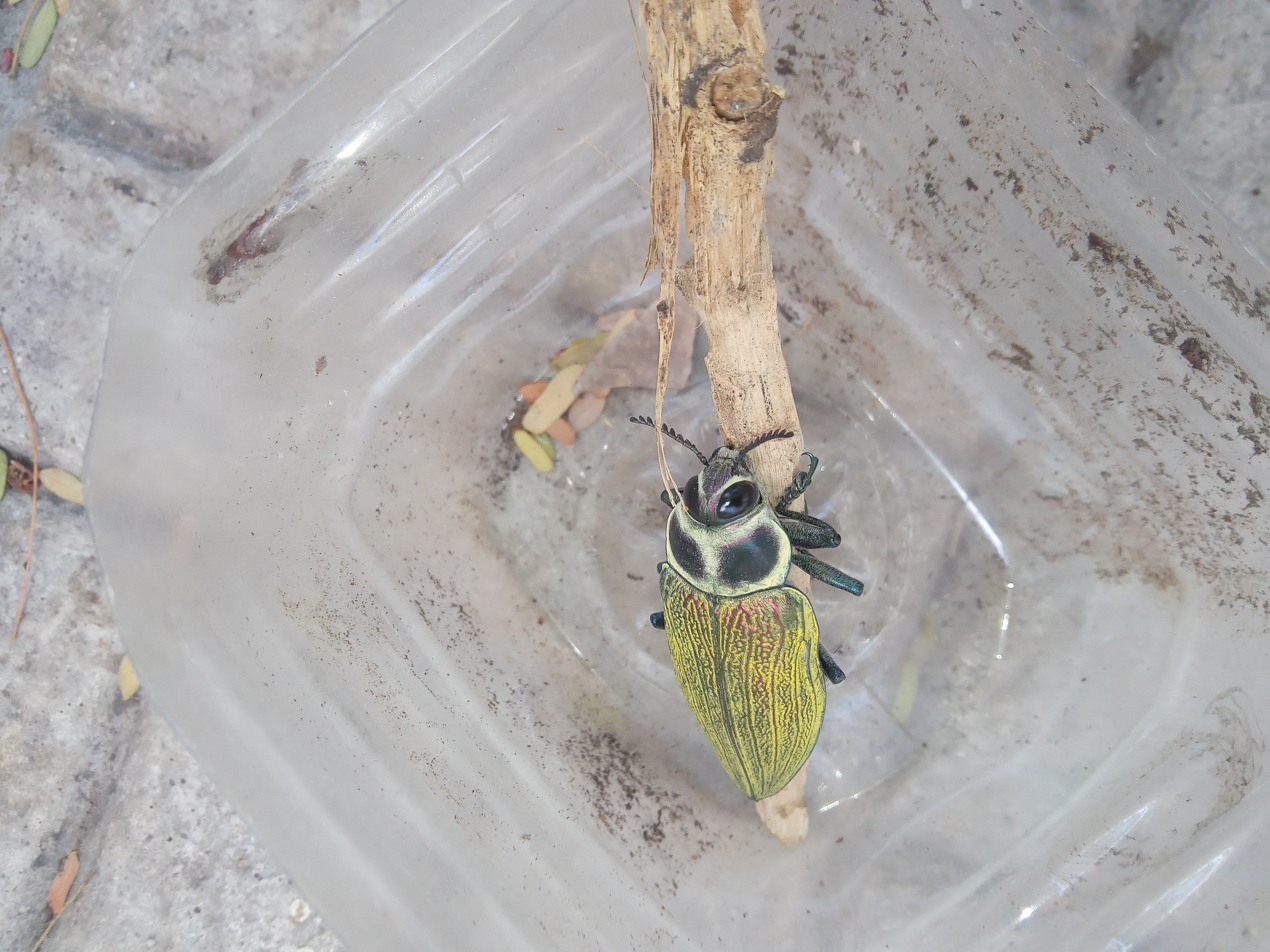
Specimen found in Jamaica on an ackee tree (Blighia sapida). Remarkaby it resembles the ackee fruit pod.

Euchroma giganteum, the metallic wood boring beetle or giant metallic ceiba borer, is a species of beetle in the family Buprestidae, the only species in the genus Euchroma.

== Subspecies ==
- Euchroma giganteum giganteum (Linnaeus, 1758)
- Euchroma giganteum goliath (Laporte & Gory, 1836)
- Euchroma giganteum harperi Sharp, 1881
- Euchroma giganteum incum Obenberger, 1928
- Euchroma giganteum peruanum Obenberger, 1928

== Description ==
Euchroma giganteum is one of the largest of the buprestid beetles (hence the Latin name "giganteum" of the species), reaching a length of about 50–80 millimetres (2.0–3.1 in).

Catoxantha and Megaloxantha are among the few other members of the family that reach a comparable size.

The body of E. giganteum is robust and elongated and the elytra have a wrinkled surface and a metallic green colour with reddish or purplish tinges. The pronotum has a dark spot on each side. The larvae reach a length of about 12–15 centimetres (4.7–5.9 in). The elytra of newly emerged adults have a coating of a yellowish, waxy powder. As the beetle ages this powder wear off.

== Behavior ==
The males apparently attract the females by a clicking sound produced by the elytra. This species usually mates in August. The larvae are miners of fallen timber, while adults are usually found walking around on the trunks of trees.

== Diet ==
Larvae feed on decaying timber, especially of the Bombacaceae family (kapok or ceiba trees, mainly Ceiba pentandra, Bombacopsis spp., Ochroma spp. and Pseudobombax spp.), but also of Araucaria angustifolia and Ficus species.

== Distribution and habitat ==
This species is native to Central and South America (Mexico, Panama, Ecuador, Peru, Brazil, Colombia, Argentina, Venezuela (Guarenas-Naranjal)) and on Jamaica. It lives in warm Amazon regions up to elevations of 1,200 metres (3,900 ft) above sea level.

== Gallery ==
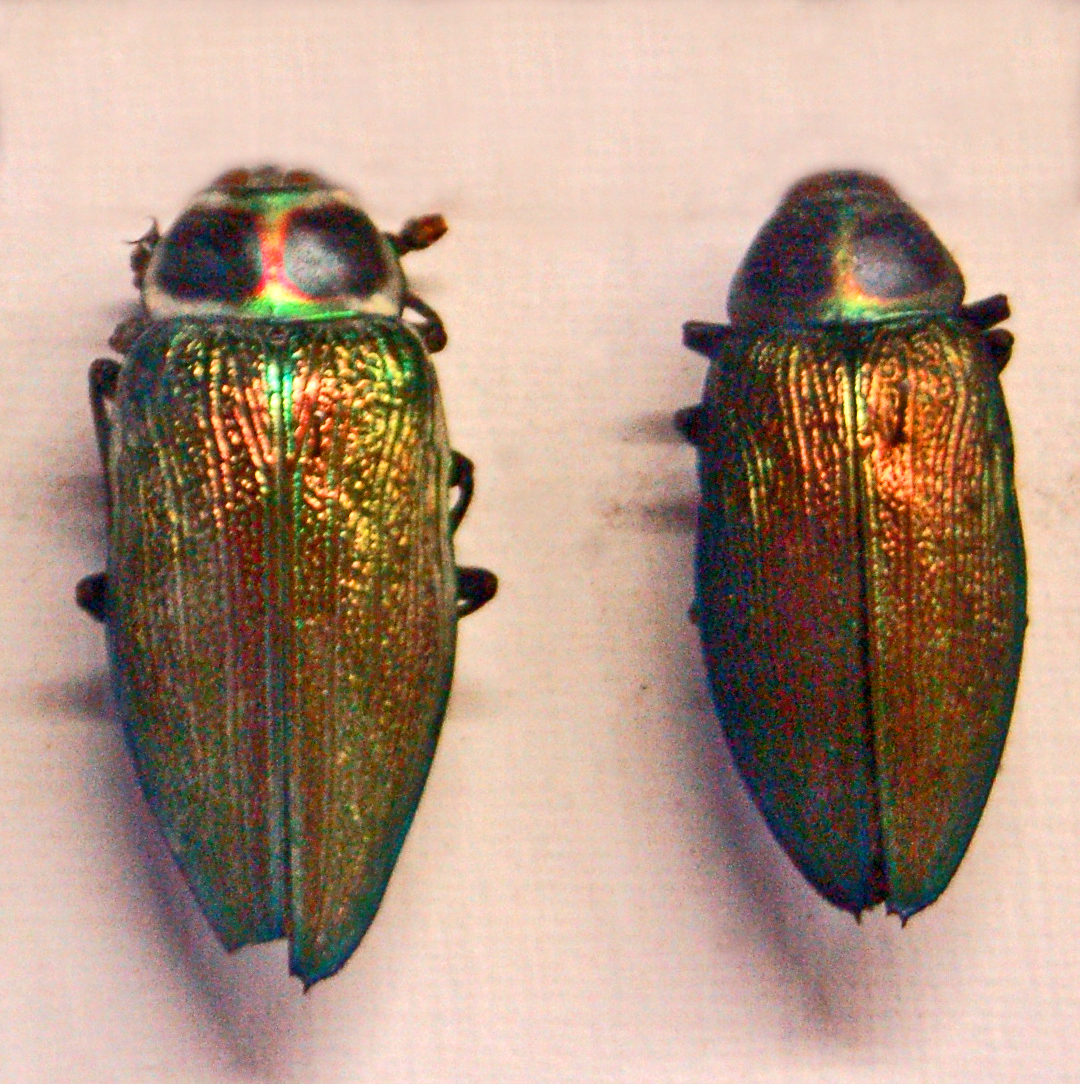
Euchroma gigantea from Brazil, mounted specimen at National Museum (Prague)

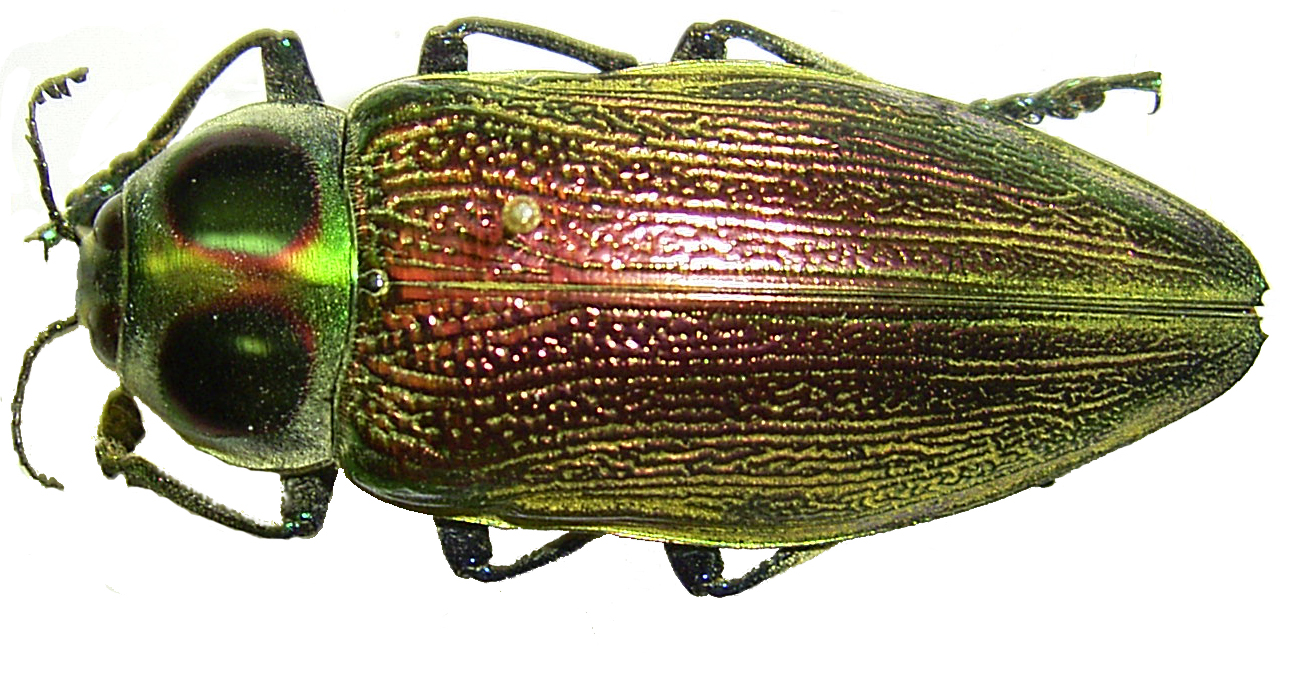
Euchroma gigantea from Sammlung Staatliches Museum für Naturkunde, Karlsruhe

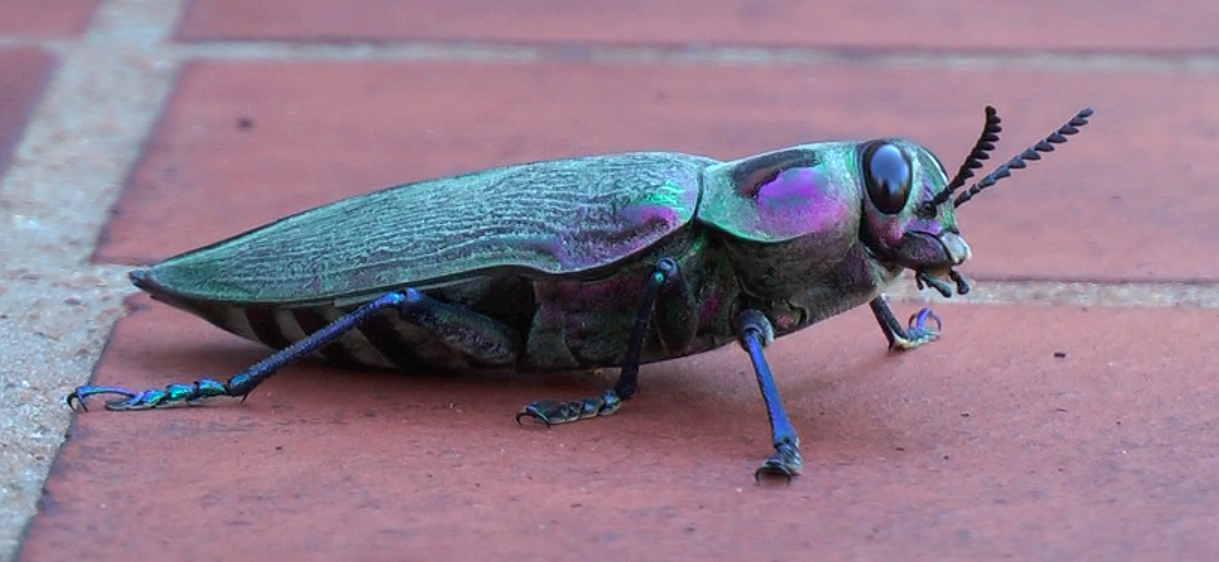
A live individual of Euchroma gigantea

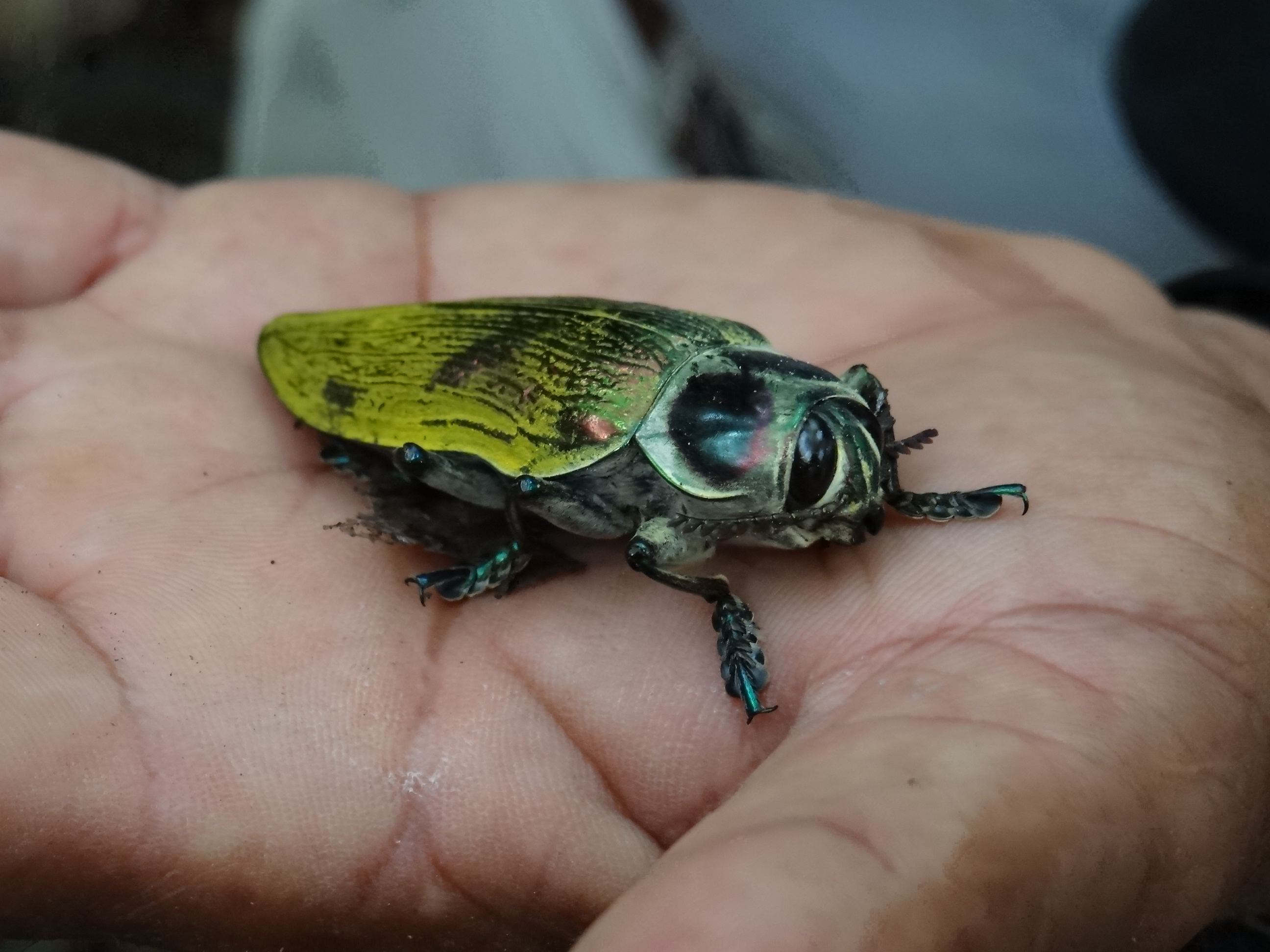
Live specimen in Peru, on human hand
