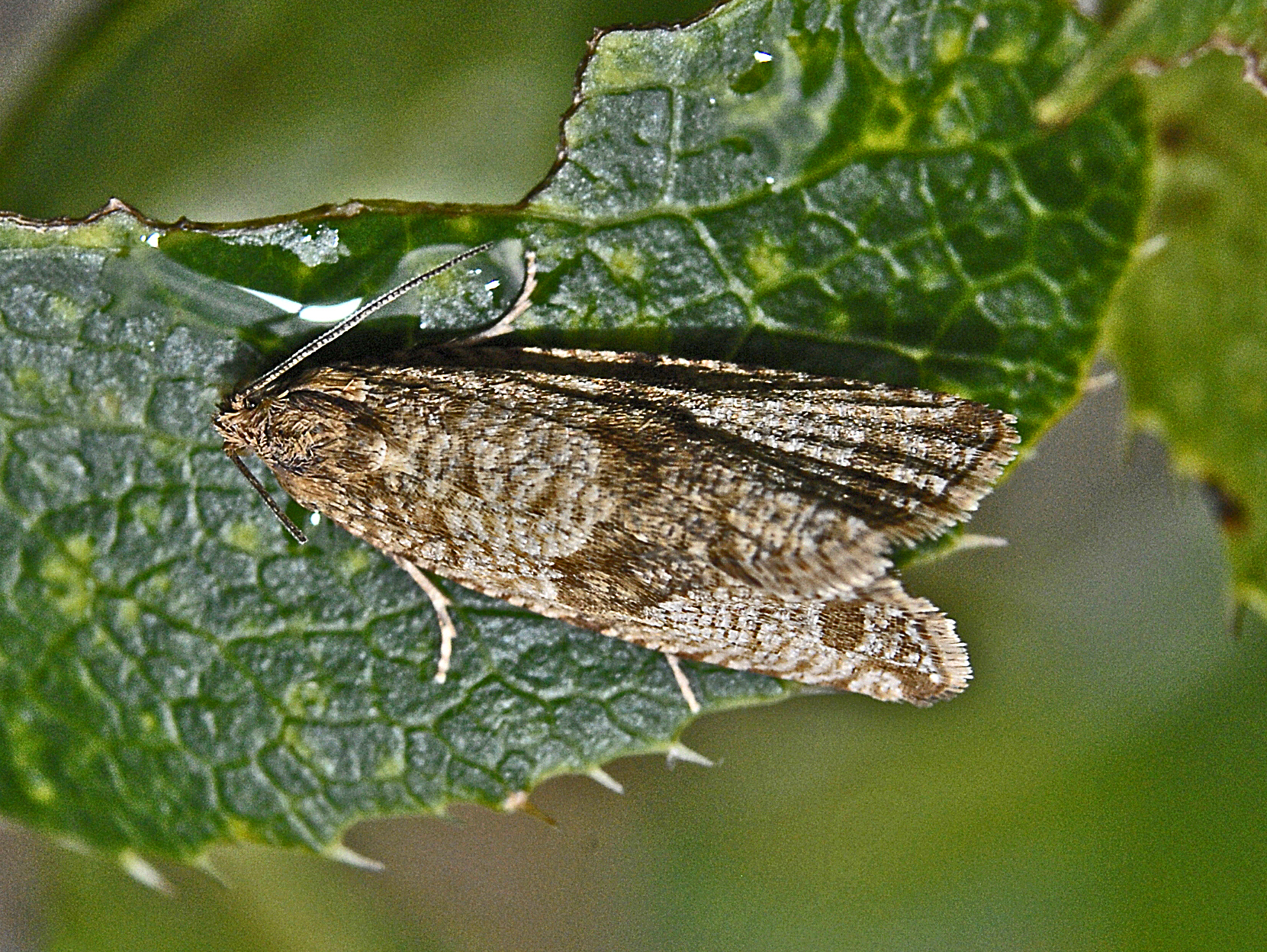
- Celypha striana. Dorsal view

Scientific classification
- Kingdom: Animalia
- Phylum: Arthropoda
- Class: Insecta
- Order: Lepidoptera
- Family: Tortricidae
- Genus: Celypha
- Species: C. striana

Binomial name
- Celypha striana (Denis & Schiffermüller, 1775)

Synonyms
- List: Phiaris striana Denis & Schiffermüller, 1775 Tortrix striana Denis & Schiffermüller, 1775; Phalaena biliturana Donovan, [1806]; Tortrix fasciolana Hubner, [1814-1817]; Celypha striana obsoletana Gibeaux, 1984; Tortrix rusticana Hubner, [1796-1799]; Orthotaenia striana subcapreolana Obraztsov, 1949

= Celypha striana =

Species of moth

Celypha striana is a moth of the family Tortricidae. It is the type species of its genus Celypha.

== Subspecies ==
Subspecies include:

- Celypha striana obsoletana Gibeaux, 1984
- Celypha striana subcapreolana Obraztsov, 1949

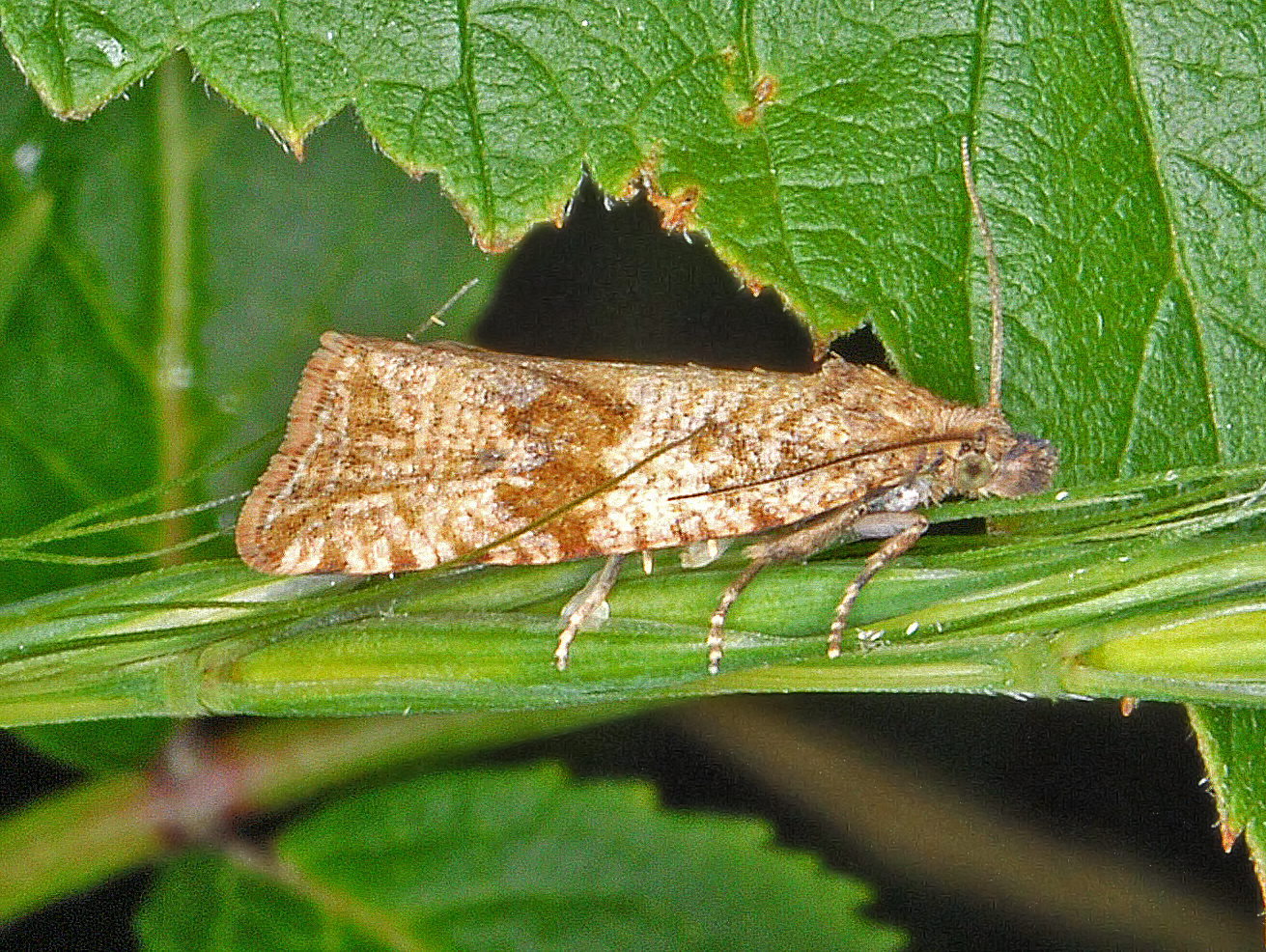
Lateral view

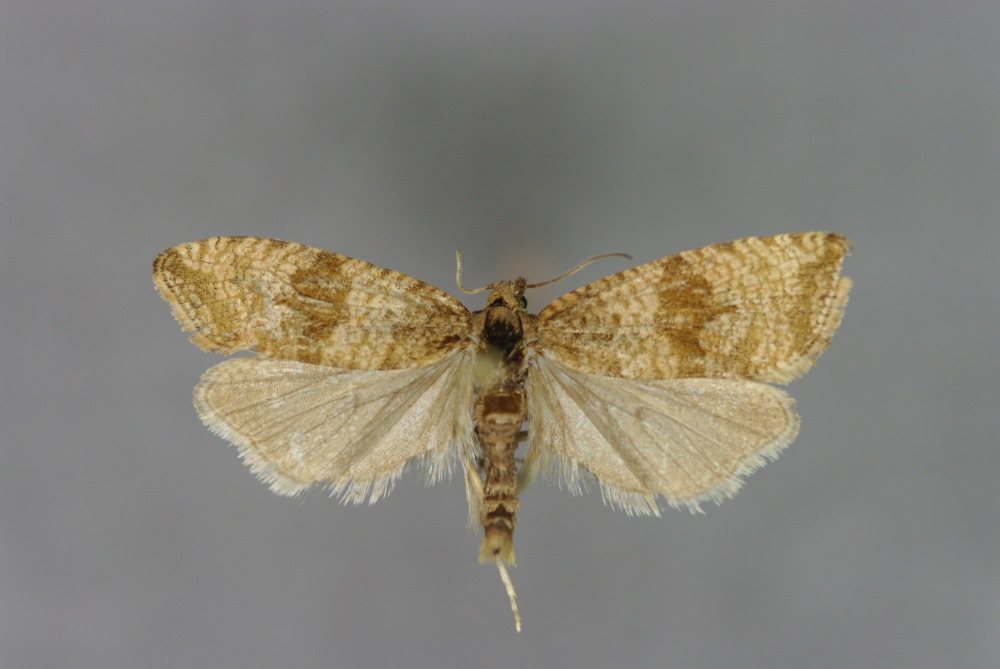
Mounted specimen

== Distribution ==
This species can be found in most of Europe and in the eastern Palearctic realm, except the far north and northern Asia.

== Habitat ==
This species prefers open grassy habitats, rough meadows and roadsides.

== Description ==
The wingspan is 16–22 mm. This species is very variable in color. Usually the basic color of the forewings is light ochreous, finely reticulated dark brown. In the middle of the forewings there is a strongly developed transverse darker brown band and brown markings on the outer edge. The hindwings are gray or pale brown. Julius von Kennel provides a full description.

== Biology ==
These moths fly from late May to late September.. The males are active by day and from dusk onwards, while females fly only from dusk. They are attracted to light. The larvae feed on the roots of dandelion (Taraxacum officinale). They pupate in a cocoon and hibernate.

== Notes ==
1. The flight season refers to Belgium and The Netherlands. This may vary in other parts of the range.
