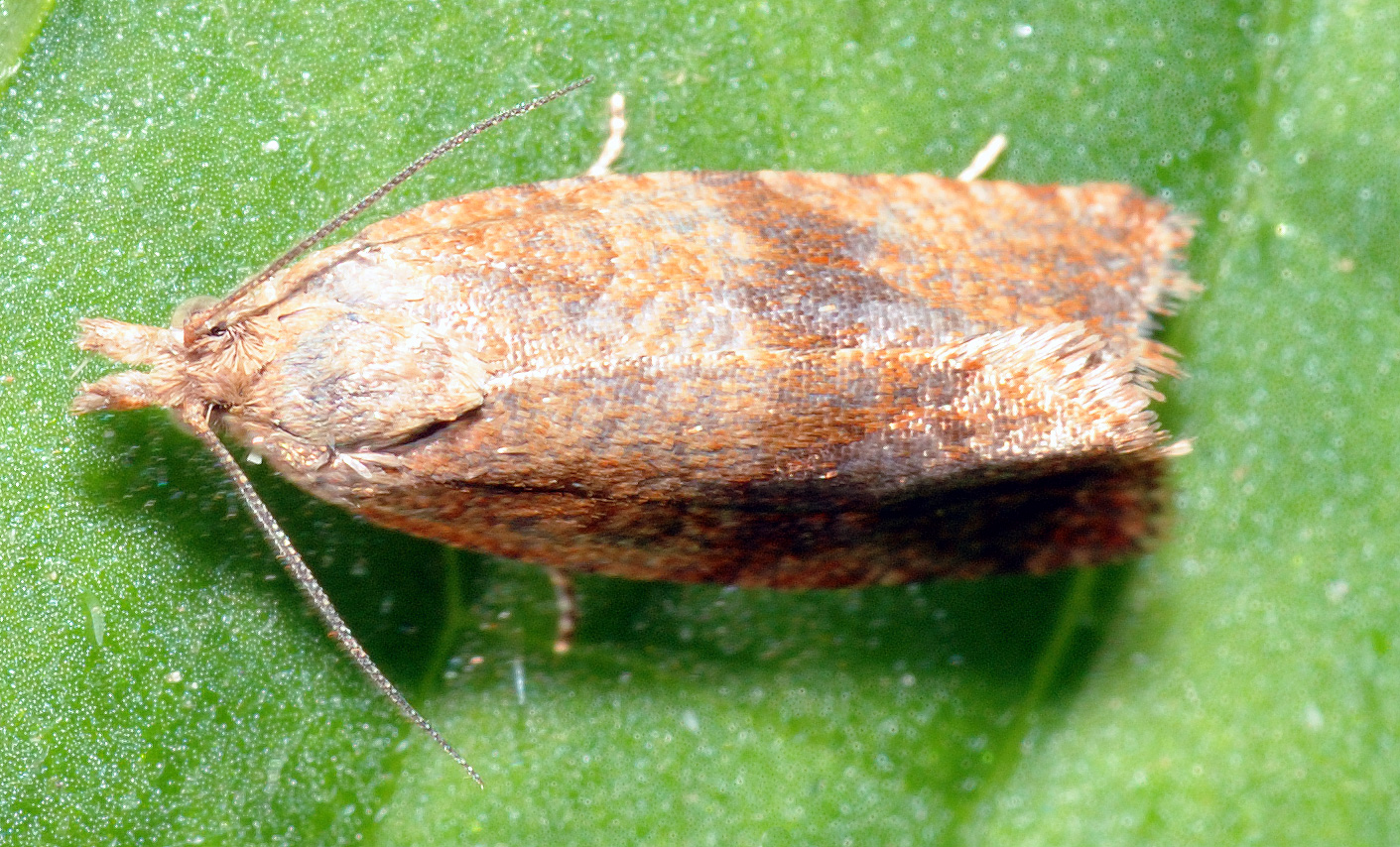
- Adult C. striana seen from above

Scientific classification
- Kingdom: Animalia
- Phylum: Arthropoda
- Clade: Pancrustacea
- Class: Insecta
- Order: Lepidoptera
- Family: Tortricidae
- Subfamily: Olethreutinae
- Tribe: Olethreutini
- Genus: Celypha; Hübner, 1825

Type species
- Tortrix striana Denis & Schiffermüller, 1775

Diversity
- 20 species

Synonyms
- Numerous, see text

= Celypha =

Genus of tortrix moths

Celypha is a genus of tortrix moths (family Tortricidae). It belongs to the tribe Olethreutini of subfamily Olethreutinae.

The closely related genus Syricoris is sometimes included in Celypha.

== Taxonomy ==
=== Species ===
The twenty currently recognized species of Celypha are:

- Celypha anatoliana (Caradja, 1916)
- Celypha argyrata Razowski, 2009
- Celypha atriapex Razowski, 2009
- Celypha aurofasciana
- Celypha capreolana (Herrich-Schäffer, 1851)
- Celypha cespitana
- Celypha conflictana (Kennel, 1901)
- Celypha constructa (Meyrick, 1922)
- Celypha cornigerus (Oku, 1968)
- Celypha ermolenkoi Kostyuk, 1980
- Celypha erythrana (Tengstrom, 1848)
- Celypha flavipalpana (Herrich-Schäffer, 1851)
- Celypha hydrangeana (Kuznetzov, 1969)
- Celypha kostjukorum Budashkin & Dubatolov, 2006
- Celypha kurilensis (Oku, 1965)
- Celypha perfracta Diakonoff, 1983
- Celypha pseudalarixicola Liu & Fang in Jianwen & Liu, 1992
- Celypha rufana
- Celypha rurestrana (Duponchel in Godart, 1842)
- Celypha sapaecola Razowski, 2009
- Celypha sistrata (Meyrick, 1911)
- Celypha striana
- Celypha woodiana (Barrett, 1882)

=== Synonyms ===
Obsolete scientific names (junior synonyms and others) for this genus are:

- Celypa (lapsus)
- Celyphoides Obraztsov, 1960
- Cleyphoides (lapsus)
- Euchroma (lapsus, non Solier, 1833: preoccupied)
- Euchromia Stephens, 1829 (non Hübner, [1819]: preoccupied)
- Loxoterma Busck, 1906

Due to the very close relationship between Celypha and the "wastebin genus" Olethreutes, there has been some confusion about the former's synonymy. Celyphoides and Loxoterma are sometimes listed as a synonym of Olethreutes. But the type species of the first is Tortrix flavipalpana (a junior synonym of C. flavipalpana), and that of the second is T. latifasciana (a junior synonym of C. aurofasciana). This makes Celyphoides and Loxoterma junior subjective synonyms of Celypha, at least in its present delimitation.

Celyphoides, meanwhile, was a nomen nudum for 5 years. It was first used by R. Agenjo Cecilia in 1955, but only properly established by N.S. Obraztsov in 1960.
