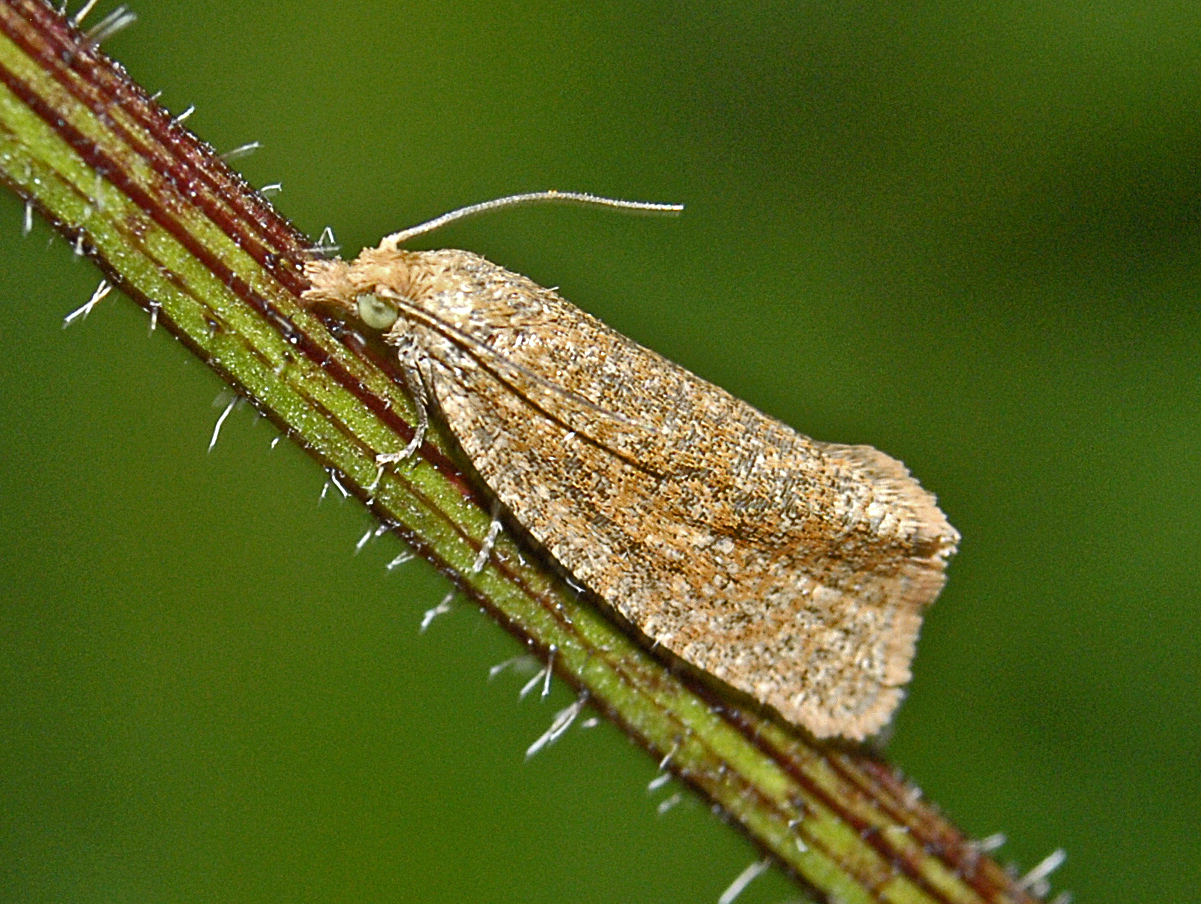

Scientific classification
- Kingdom: Animalia
- Phylum: Arthropoda
- Clade: Pancrustacea
- Class: Insecta
- Order: Lepidoptera
- Family: Tortricidae
- Genus: Celypha
- Species: C. rufana

Binomial name
- Celypha rufana (Scopoli, 1763)

Synonyms
- Several, see text

= Celypha rufana =

Lakes marble

Species of moth

Celypha rufana, the lakes marble, is a small moth species of the family Tortricidae, long known under the junior synonym C. rosaceana.

== Synonyms ==
Junior synonyms of this species are:

- Argyroploce rufana (Scopoli, 1763)
- Celypha rosaceana (Schläger, 1848)
- Euchromia arenana Laharpe, 1858
- Phalaena rufana Scopoli, 1763
- Sciaphila rosaceana Schläger, 1848
- Tortrix purpurana Haworth, [1811] (non Thunberg, 1784: preoccupied)
- Tortrix rosetana Hübner, [1796-1799]

== Description ==
The wingspan is 15–19 mm. The basic color of the forewings is rosy or purplish (hence the Latin species name rosaceana, meaning pinkish) when the moth is freshly emerged, but it turns quickly to a dull buff tinge or a rufous coloration, with a lightly reticulated (net-like) pattern. Julius von Kennel provides a full description.

These bivoltine moths fly during the afternoon and evening from May to July and in August and September.

The caterpillars feed in April and May mainly on the rootstock of sow thistles (Sonchus species) and common dandelion (Taraxacum officinale), but also on various other plants (Chrysanthemum leucanthemum, Artemisia vulgaris, Plantago, Achillea, etc.). They have also been reported to be myrmecophilous.

== Distribution and habitat ==
This species can be found in most of Europe. It prefers rough ground, grassland and edges of woodlands.
