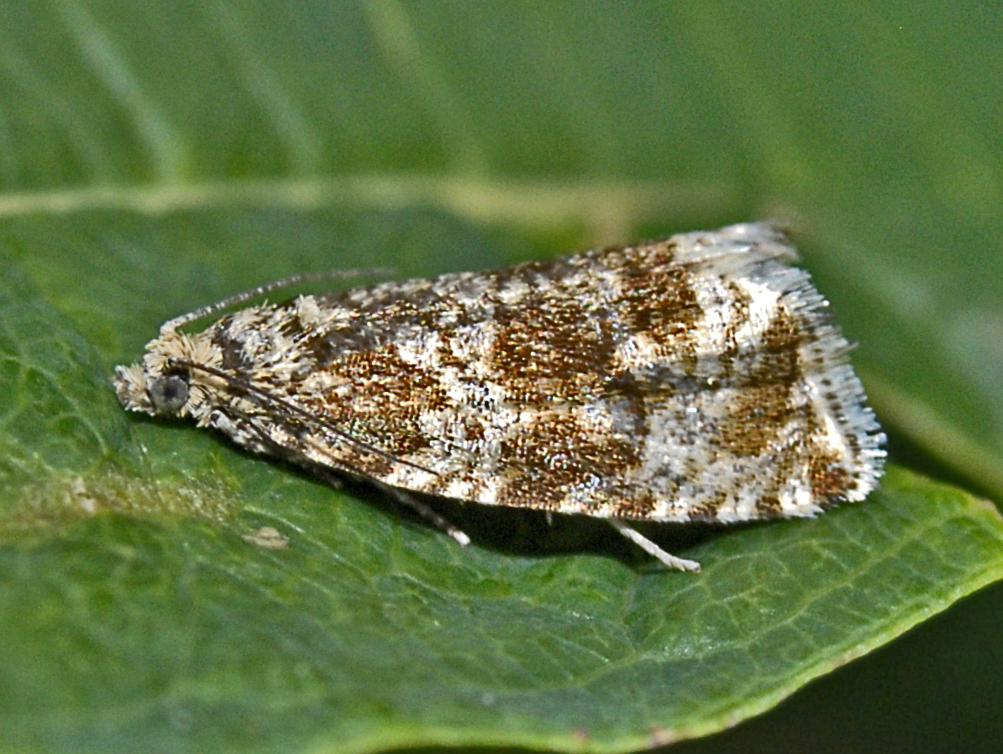
- Orthotaenia undulana

Scientific classification
- Domain: Eukaryota
- Kingdom: Animalia
- Phylum: Arthropoda
- Class: Insecta
- Order: Lepidoptera
- Family: Tortricidae
- Subfamily: Olethreutinae
- Genus: Orthotaenia; Stephens, 1829

= Orthotaenia =

Genus of tortrix moths

Orthotaenia is a genus of moths belonging to the subfamily Olethreutinae of the family Tortricidae.

== Species ==
- Orthotaenia secunda Falkovitsh, 1962
- Orthotaenia undulana ([Denis & Schiffermüller], 1775)

== See also ==
- List of Tortricidae genera
