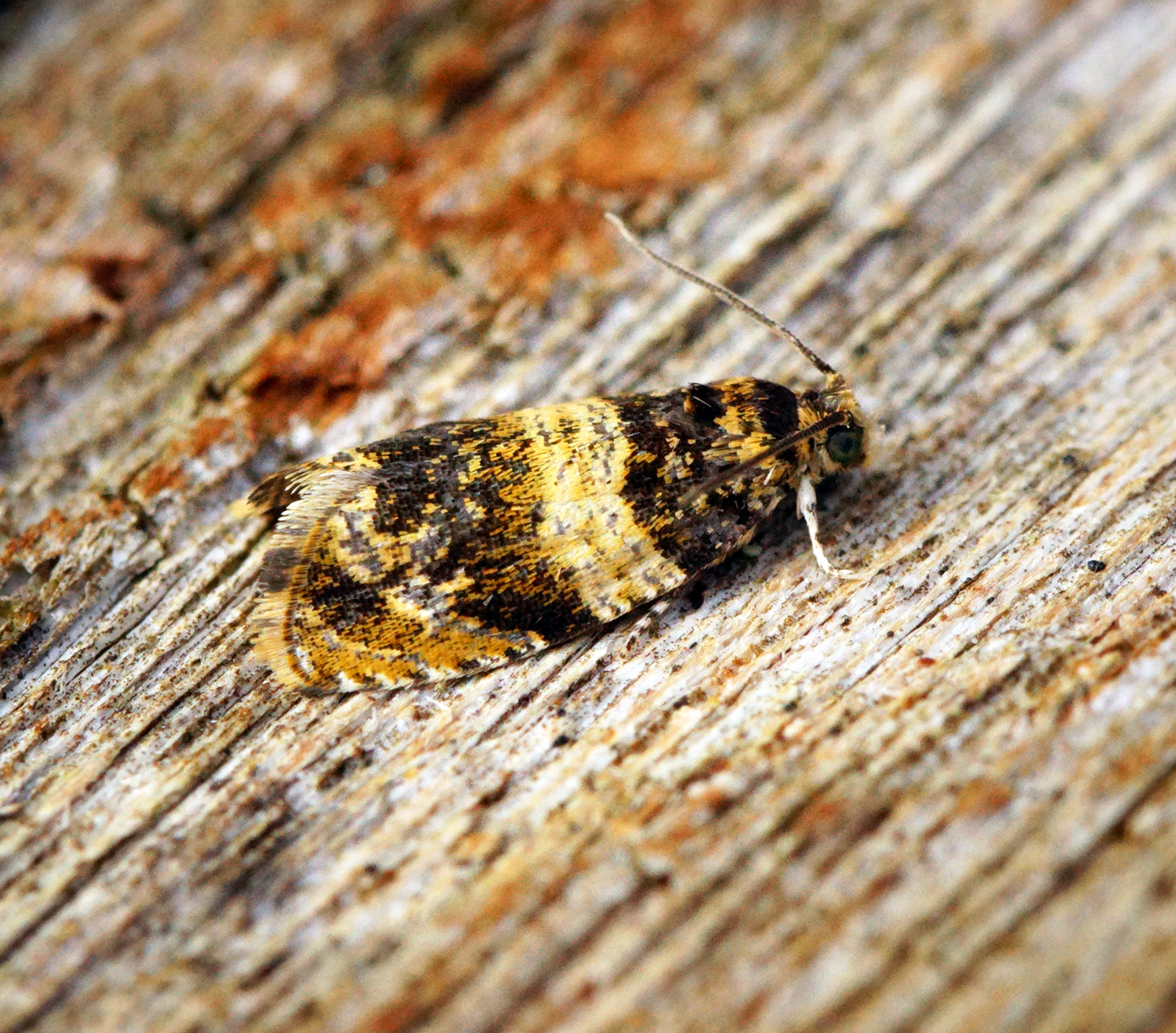

Scientific classification
- Kingdom: Animalia
- Phylum: Arthropoda
- Clade: Pancrustacea
- Class: Insecta
- Order: Lepidoptera
- Family: Tortricidae
- Genus: Celypha
- Species: C. aurofasciana

Binomial name
- Celypha aurofasciana (Haworth, 1811)

Synonyms
- Several, see text

= Celypha aurofasciana =

Species of moth

Celypha aurofasciana is a small moth species of the family Tortricidae. It is native to Europe and the Palearctic but occurs in some other places as an introduced species.

Its wingspan is 12–14 mm. The face is white. The forewings are yellow, strigulated with dark fuscous and striated with leaden grey, more strongly posteriorly. The basal patch and central fascia are dark fuscous, the space between them forming a broad slightly curved pale striated fascia. There is a dark fuscous streak from the costa at 2/3 to the middle of the termen. The hindwings are dark grey. The larva is pale yellow; head black; plate of 2 reddish

Adults are on wing from June to July. to eat rotting wood.

== Synonyms ==
Obsolete names (junior synonyms and others) of this species are:

- Celypha paleana Caradja, 1916
- Cymolomia latifasciana (Haworth, 1811)
- Grapholitha dormoyana Duponchel in Godart, 1835
- Loxoterma latifasciana var. paleana Caradja, 1916
- Olethreutes aurofascianus (lapsus)
- Tortrix aurofasciana Haworth, 1811
- Tortrix latifasciana Haworth, 1811
- Tortrix venustana Frölich, 1828
