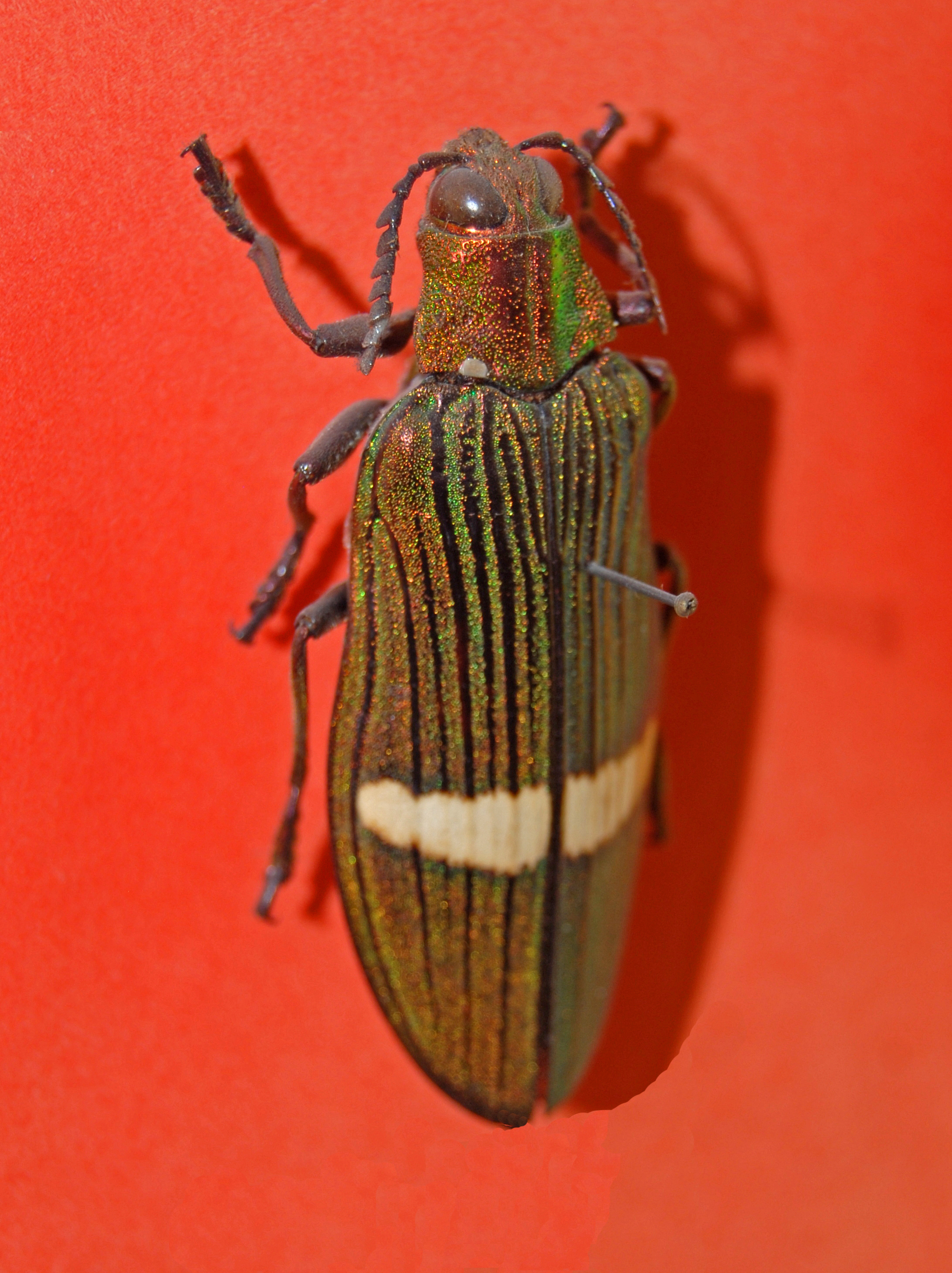
- Catoxantha purpurea, on display at the Museo Civico di Storia Naturale di Milano

Scientific classification
- Domain: Eukaryota
- Kingdom: Animalia
- Phylum: Arthropoda
- Class: Insecta
- Order: Coleoptera
- Suborder: Polyphaga
- Infraorder: Elateriformia
- Family: Buprestidae
- Genus: Catoxantha
- Species: C. purpurea

Binomial name
- Catoxantha purpurea (White, 1843)

Synonyms
- Chrysochroa purpurea (White, 1843)

= Catoxantha purpurea =

Species of beetle

Catoxantha purpurea is a species of jewel beetle belonging to the family Buprestidae, subfamily Chrysochroinae.

== Distribution ==
This beetle has an Indomalayan distribution (Philippines; Luzon Island).

== Description ==
Catoxantha purpurea can reach a length of about 45–50 millimetres (1.8–2.0 in). This beautiful jewel beetle has metallic reddish purple elytra with thick and prominent black costae and one yellow transverse bands. Legs and antennae are black. Abdominal sternum is yellow.
