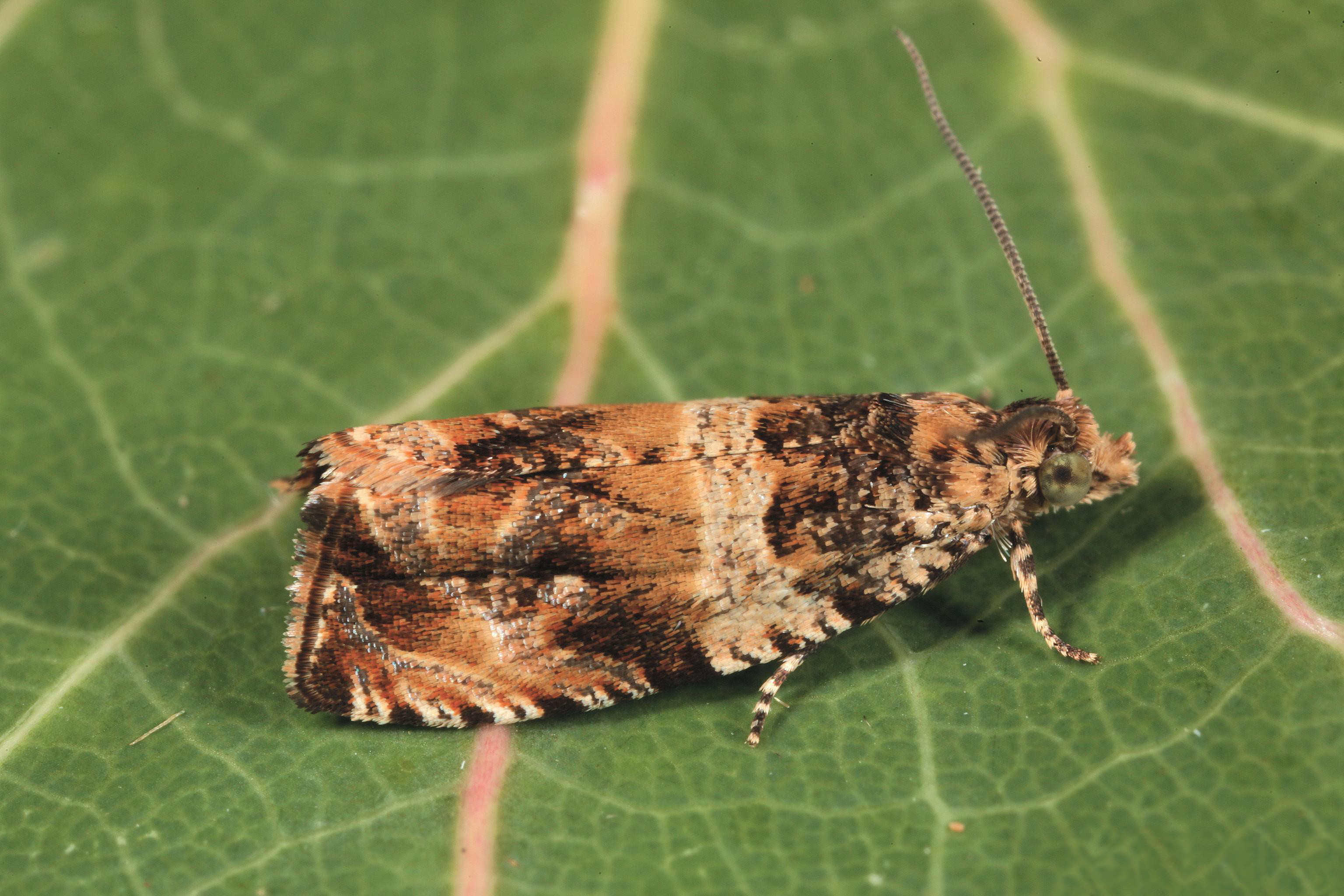

Scientific classification
- Domain: Eukaryota
- Kingdom: Animalia
- Phylum: Arthropoda
- Class: Insecta
- Order: Lepidoptera
- Family: Tortricidae
- Genus: Celypha
- Species: C. flavipalpana

Binomial name
- Celypha flavipalpana (Herrich-Schaffer, 1851)

Synonyms
- Tortrix (Sericoris) flavipalpana Herrich-Schaffer, 1851; Celyphoides flavipalpana alpivagana Hartig, 1962; Argyroploce euedra Meyrick in Caradja & Meyrick, 1937; Argyroploce lobocasis Meyrick in Caradja & Meyrick, 1937

= Celypha flavipalpana =

Species of moth

Celypha flavipalpana is a species of moth of the family Tortricidae. It is found in most of Europe, except Ireland, Great Britain, Fennoscandia, the Iberian Peninsula and most of the Balkan Peninsula.

The wingspan is 13–17 mm. Adults are on wing from June to August in one or possibly two generations per year.

The larvae are polyphagous. Recorded food plants include Calluna vulgaris, Thymus and Trifolium species.
