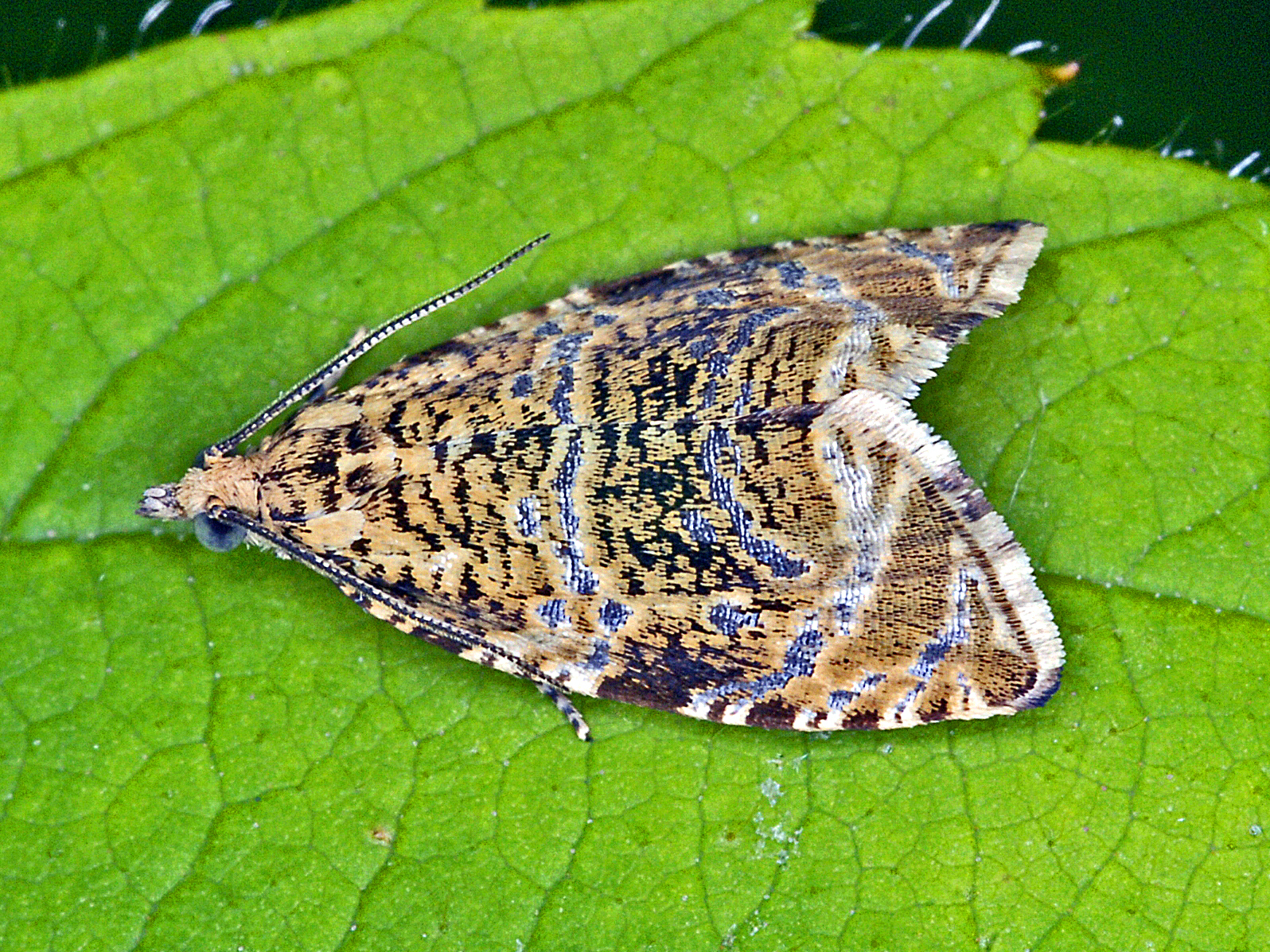
- Adult of Syricoris lacunana

Scientific classification
- Domain: Eukaryota
- Kingdom: Animalia
- Phylum: Arthropoda
- Class: Insecta
- Order: Lepidoptera
- Family: Tortricidae
- Tribe: Olethreutini
- Genus: Syricoris; Treitschke, 1829

Synonyms
- Paracelypha Obraztsov, 1960; Sericoris Treitschke, 1830

= Syricoris =

Genus of tortrix moths

Syricoris is a genus of moths belonging to the subfamily Olethreutinae of the family Tortricidae.

The genus Syricoris is sometimes included in the closely related genus Celypha.

== Species ==
- Syricoris apicipunctana (Walsingham, 1891)
- Syricoris astrana (Guenee, 1845)
- Syricoris lacunana ([Denis & Schiffermuller], 1775)
- Syricoris perexiguana (Kuznetzov, 1988)
- Syricoris rivulana (Scopoli, 1763)
- Syricoris tiedemanniana (Zeller, 1845)

== See also ==
- List of Tortricidae genera
