= Celypha atriapex =

Scientific classification
- Domain: Eukaryota
- Kingdom: Animalia
- Phylum: Arthropoda
- Class: Insecta
- Order: Lepidoptera
- Family: Tortricidae
- Genus: Celypha
- Species: C. atriapex

Binomial name
- Celypha atriapex Razowski, 2009

Species of moth

Celypha atriapex is a moth of the family Tortricidae. It is found in Vietnam.

The wingspan is about 10 mm.
