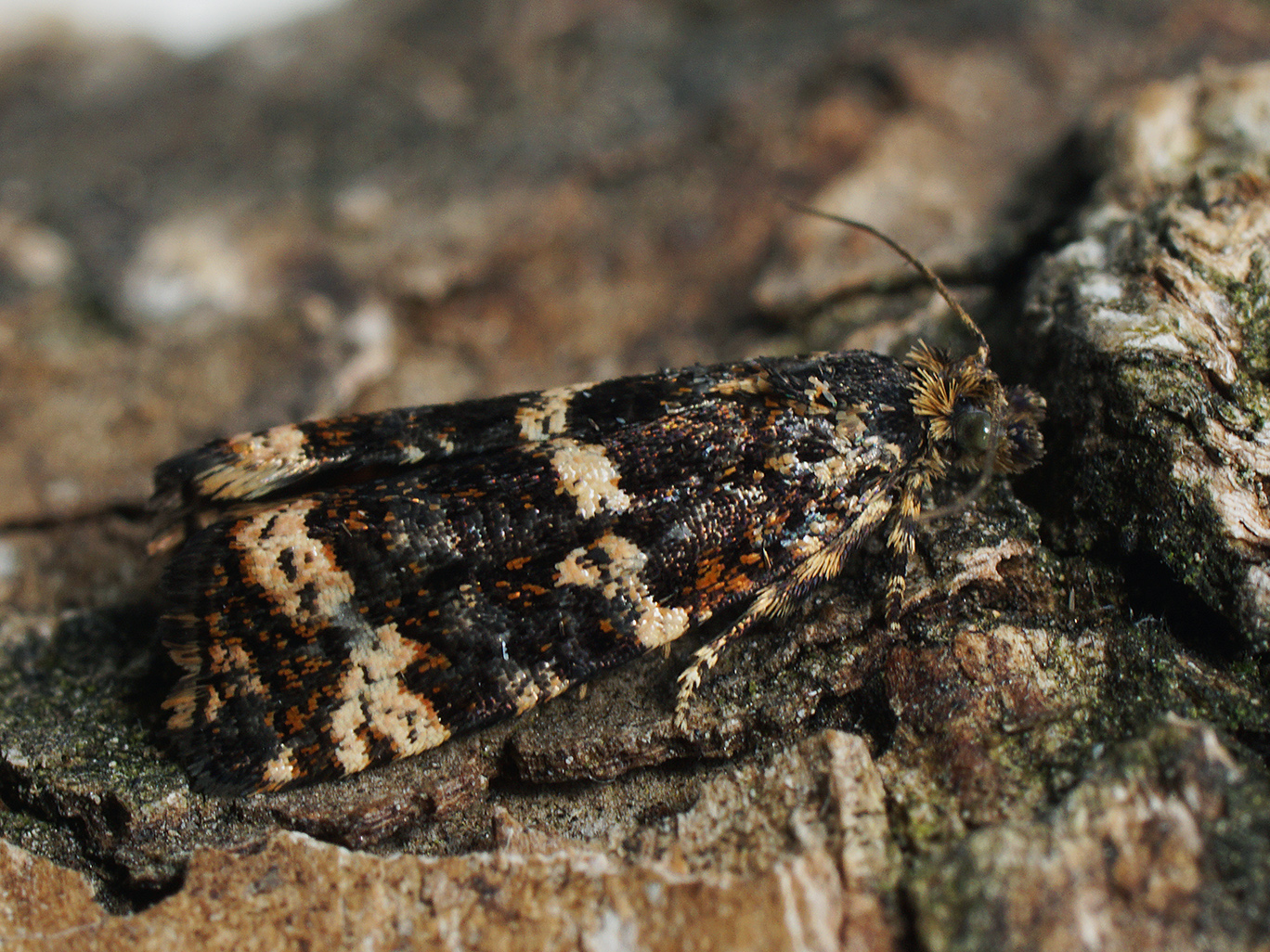

Scientific classification
- Kingdom: Animalia
- Phylum: Arthropoda
- Clade: Pancrustacea
- Class: Insecta
- Order: Lepidoptera
- Family: Tortricidae
- Genus: Syricoris
- Species: S. tiedemanniana

Binomial name
- Syricoris tiedemanniana (Zeller, 1845)

Synonyms
- Sericoris tiedemanniana Zeller, 1845; Celypha tiedemanniana

= Syricoris tiedemanniana =

Species of moth

Syricoris tiedemanniana is a moth of the family Tortricidae. It was described by Philipp Christoph Zeller in 1845. It is found in Scandinavia, the Baltic region, the Netherlands, Germany, Denmark, Austria, Poland and Russia.

The wingspan is 15–17 mm. Adults have been recorded on wing from June to August.

The larvae feed on Equisetum species, including Equisetum palustre.
