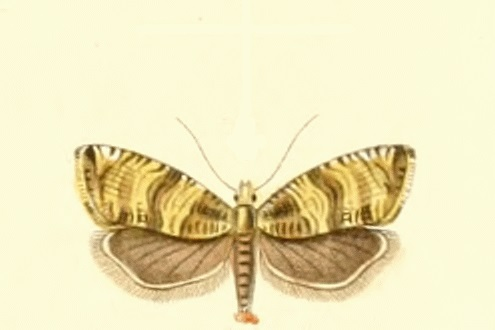

Scientific classification
- Domain: Eukaryota
- Kingdom: Animalia
- Phylum: Arthropoda
- Class: Insecta
- Order: Lepidoptera
- Family: Tortricidae
- Genus: Celypha
- Species: C. rurestrana

Binomial name
- Celypha rurestrana (Duponchel, 1843)

Synonyms
- Sericoris rurestrana Duponchel, in Godart, 1842; Argyroploce kemnerana Benander, 1943; Sericoris lucana Guenée, 1845; Sericoris lucivagana Lienig & Zeller, 1846; Penthina lucivagana var. remissana Fuchs, 1897; Penthina rupestrana Staudinger & Wocke, 1861

= Celypha rurestrana =

Hawkweed marble

Species of moth

Celypha rurestrana, the hawkweed marble, is a moth of the family Tortricidae. It was described by Philogène Auguste Joseph Duponchel in 1843. It is found in most of Europe, except Ireland, Lithuania, Ukraine and the western part of the Balkan Peninsula. It is also found in Turkey.

The wingspan is 12–17 mm. Adults are on wing from May to the beginning of August in two generations per year.

The larvae feed on Hieracium umbellatum, Sonchus and Vaccinium species. They feed within the roots of their host plant living within a silken tube or tent. Larvae can be found from April to June.
