= Celypha ermolenkoi =

Scientific classification
- Domain: Eukaryota
- Kingdom: Animalia
- Phylum: Arthropoda
- Class: Insecta
- Order: Lepidoptera
- Family: Tortricidae
- Genus: Celypha
- Species: C. ermolenkoi

Binomial name
- Celypha ermolenkoi Kostyuk, 1980

Species of moth

Celypha ermolenkoi is a species of moth of the family Tortricidae. It is found in Ukraine, on the Crimea and in Kyrgyzstan.

The wingspan is 15–17 mm. Adults have been recorded on wing in June.
