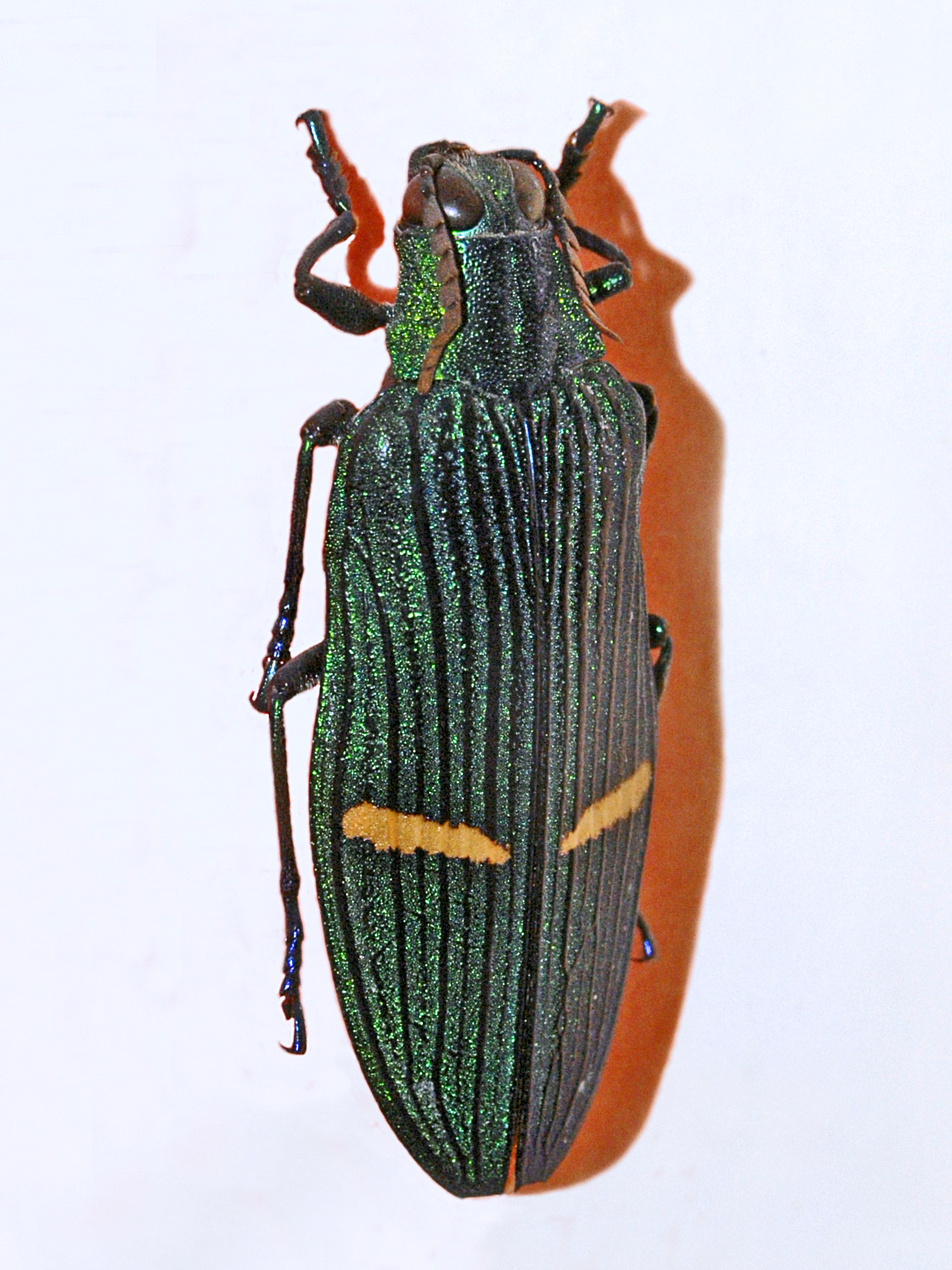
- Museum specimen of Catoxantha opulenta

Scientific classification
- Kingdom: Animalia
- Phylum: Arthropoda
- Clade: Pancrustacea
- Class: Insecta
- Order: Coleoptera
- Suborder: Polyphaga
- Infraorder: Elateriformia
- Family: Buprestidae
- Genus: Catoxantha
- Species: C. opulenta

Binomial name
- Catoxantha opulenta (Gory, 1832)

= Catoxantha opulenta =

Species of beetle

Catoxantha opulenta is a species of jewel beetle belonging to the family Buprestidae, subfamily Chrysochroinae.

== Subspecies ==
- Catoxantha opulenta borneensis Kurosawa, 1993
- Catoxantha opulenta opulenta (Gory, 1832)

== Description ==
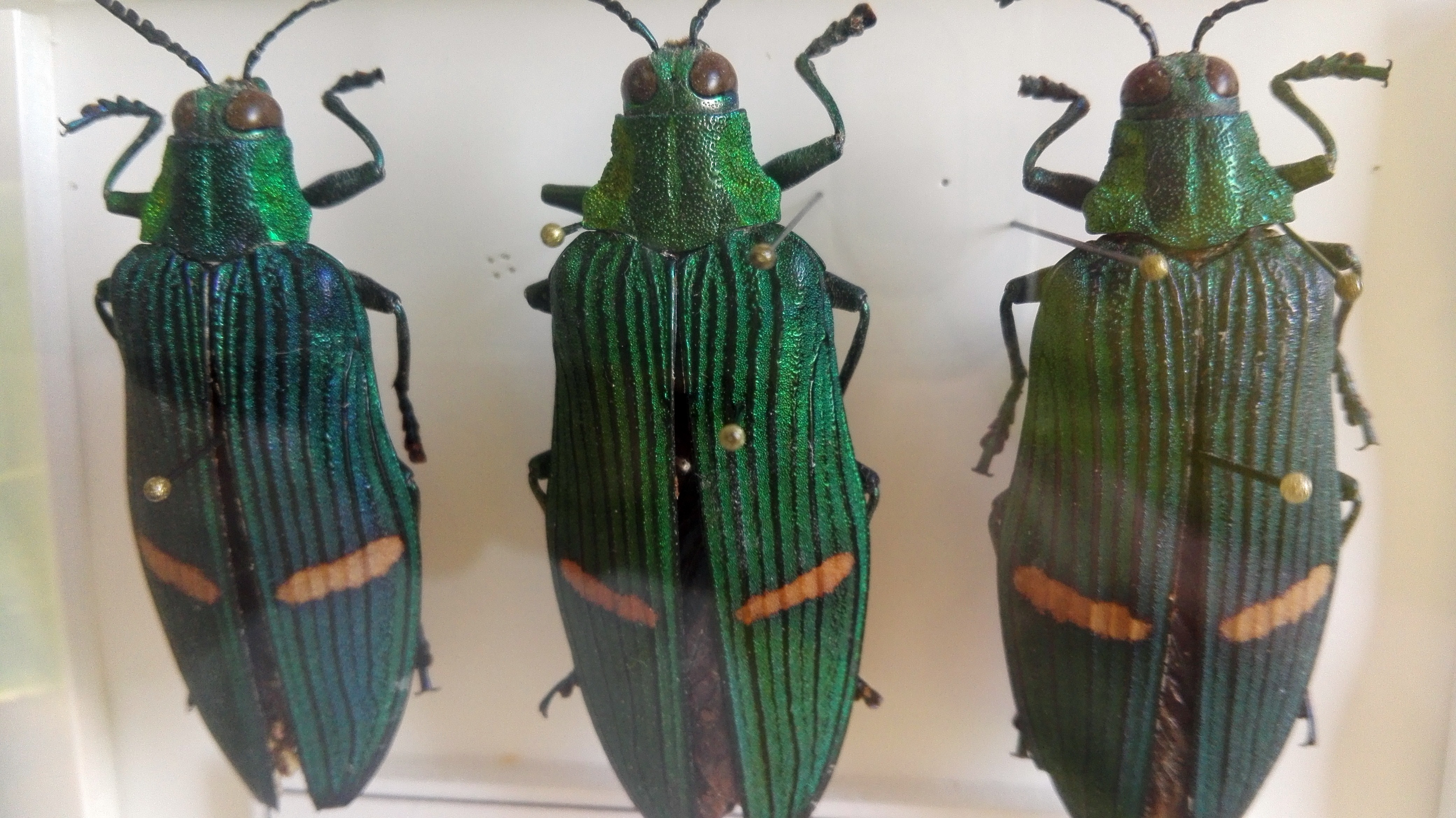

Catoxantha opulenta can reach a length of about 45 and 60 millimetres (1.8 and 2.4 in). This beautiful and quite common jewel beetle has metallic dark bluish-green elytra with thick and prominent black costae and two yellow transverse bands. Abdominal sternum is yellow. It bores the wood of Chukrasia velutina and Lagerstroemia speciosa. The life-cycle is annual. Adults emerge in June.

== Distribution ==
This beetle is present in Thailand, Malaysia, western Indonesia and Philippines.
