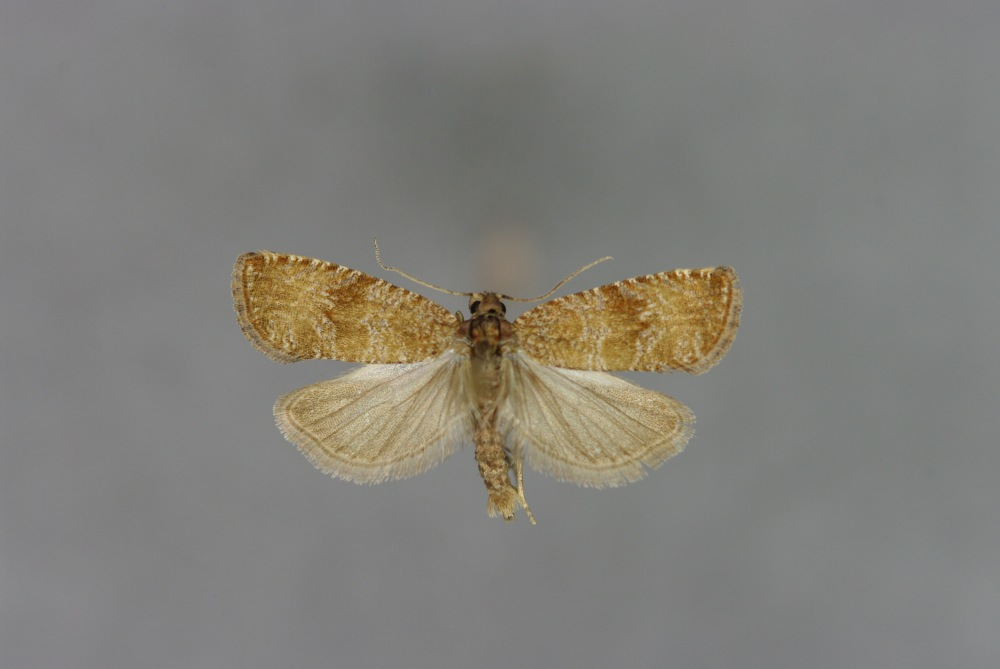

Scientific classification
- Domain: Eukaryota
- Kingdom: Animalia
- Phylum: Arthropoda
- Class: Insecta
- Order: Lepidoptera
- Family: Tortricidae
- Genus: Celypha
- Species: C. capreolana

Binomial name
- Celypha capreolana (Herrich-Schäffer, 1851)

= Celypha capreolana =

Species of moth

Celypha capreolana is a moth belonging to the family Tortricidae.

It is native to Europe.
