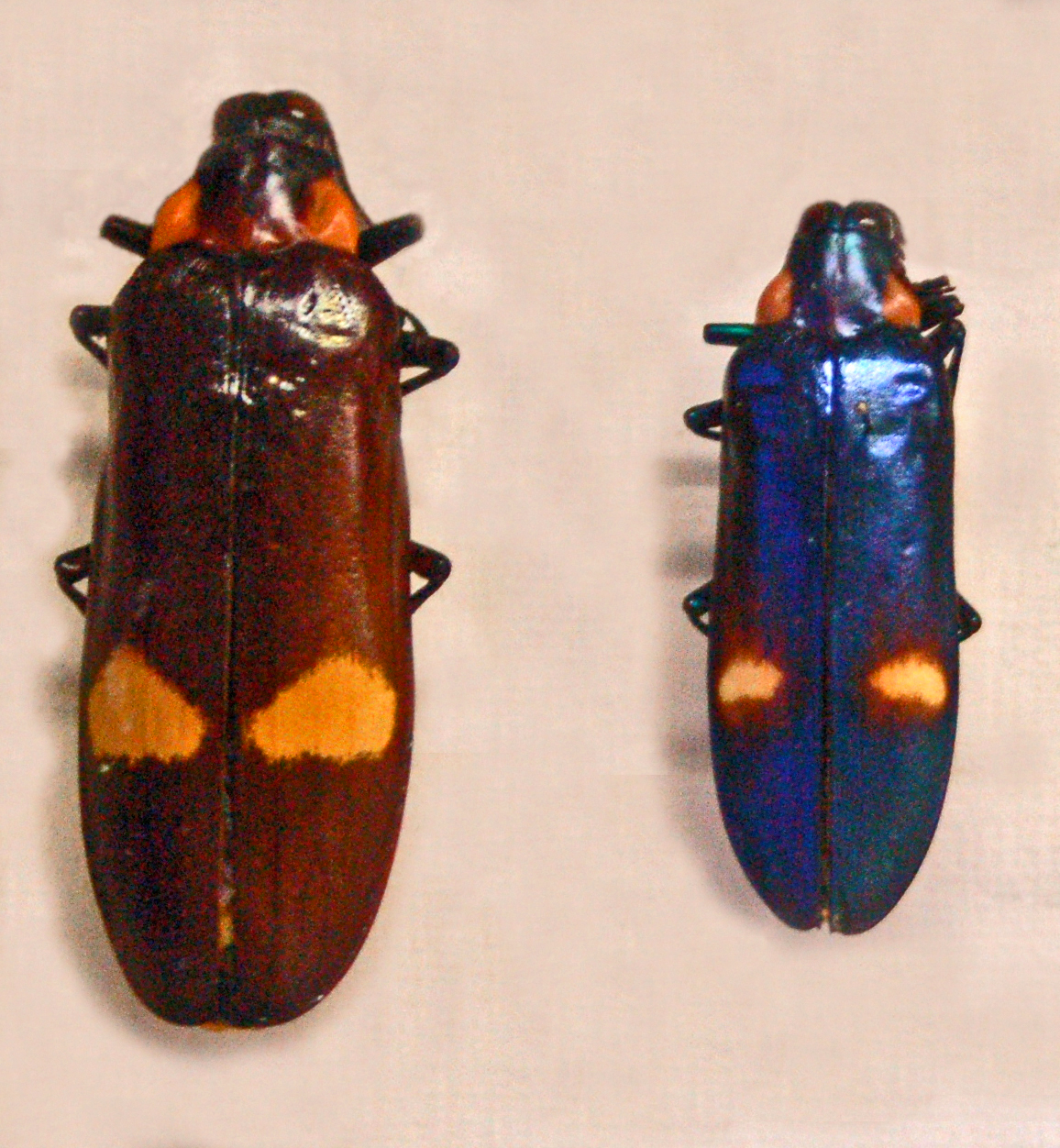
- Megaloxantha bicolor, mounted specimen at National Museum (Prague)

Scientific classification
- Kingdom: Animalia
- Phylum: Arthropoda
- Clade: Pancrustacea
- Class: Insecta
- Order: Coleoptera
- Suborder: Polyphaga
- Infraorder: Elateriformia
- Family: Buprestidae
- Genus: Megaloxantha
- Species: M. bicolor

Binomial name
- Megaloxantha bicolor (Fabricius, 1775)

= Megaloxantha bicolor =

Species of beetle

Megaloxantha bicolor is a species of metallic wood-boring beetles in the family Buprestidae.

== Description ==
Megaloxantha bicolor is a large Buprestid, reaching a length of about 75 millimetres (3.0 in). The typical colour of these beetles is metallic green, though it can also be blue, reddish, or blackish. They feature two large yellow or whitish bands, one near the base and another postmedian. The pronotal sides are usually bright orange-yellow.

== Distribution ==
This species can be found from India to Vietnam, Australia and the Philippines.

== Subspecies ==
- Megaloxantha bicolor arcuatifasciata Kurosawa, 1978
- Megaloxantha bicolor bicolor (Fabricius, 1778)
- Megaloxantha bicolor brunnea (Saunders, 1866)
- Megaloxantha bicolor gigantea (Schaller, 1783) (India)
- Megaloxantha bicolor hainana Kurosawa, 1991
- Megaloxantha bicolor luodiana Yang & Xie, 1993
- Megaloxantha bicolor matsudai Endo, 1992 (Indonesia)
- Megaloxantha bicolor nigricornis (Deyrolle, 1864) (Malaysia)
- Megaloxantha bicolor nishiyamai Endo, 1992 (Philippines)
- Megaloxantha bicolor ohtanii Kurosawa, 1991 (Indonesia, Vietnam)
- Megaloxantha bicolor palawanica Kurosawa, 1978 (Philippines)
- Megaloxantha bicolor porphyreus Hou & Wu, 1996 (Vietnam)
- Megaloxantha bicolor sakaii Kurosawa, 1991

== Gallery ==
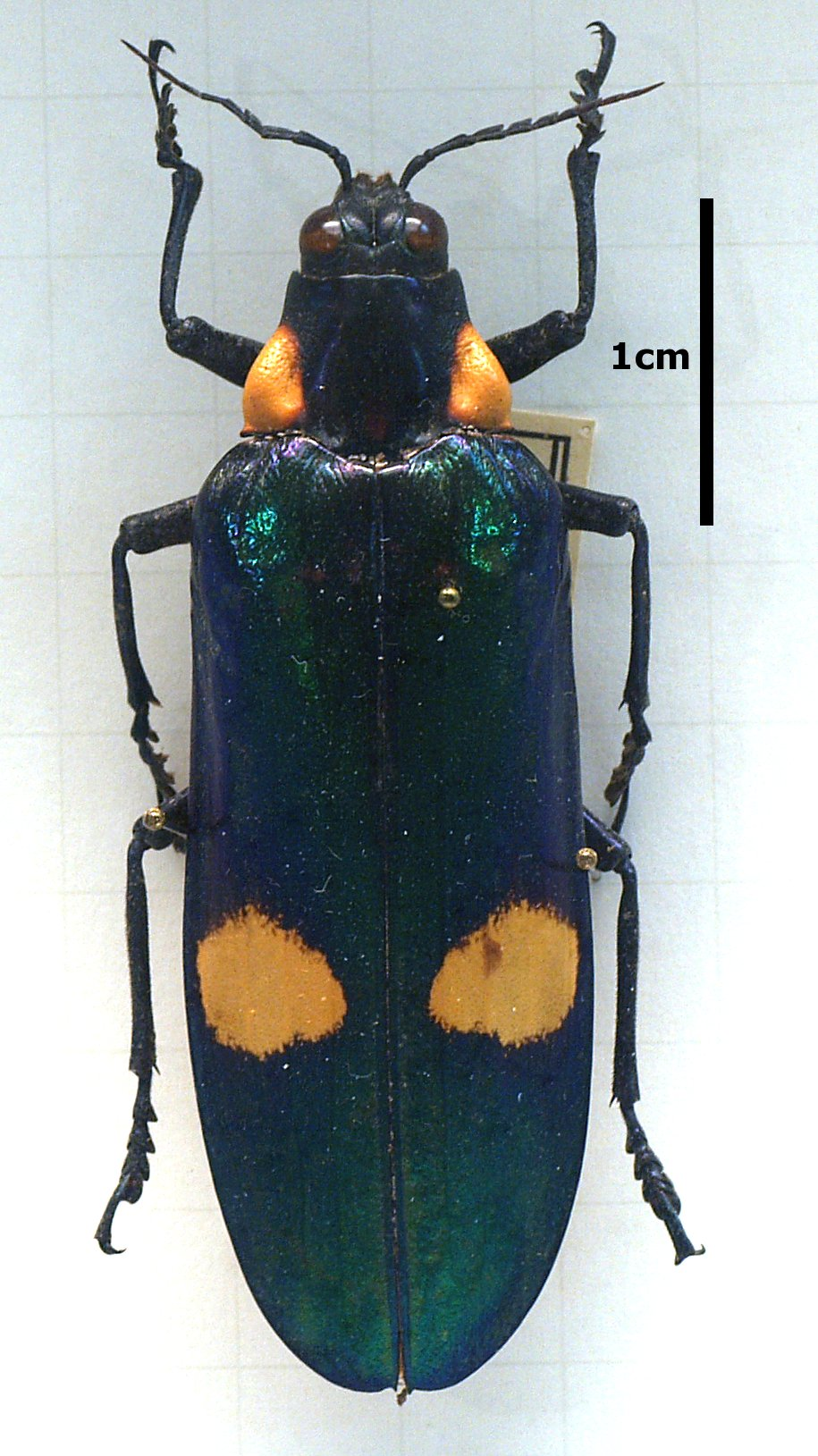
Megaloxantha bicolor gigantea from India. Mounted specimen from Cologne Zoo, Germany

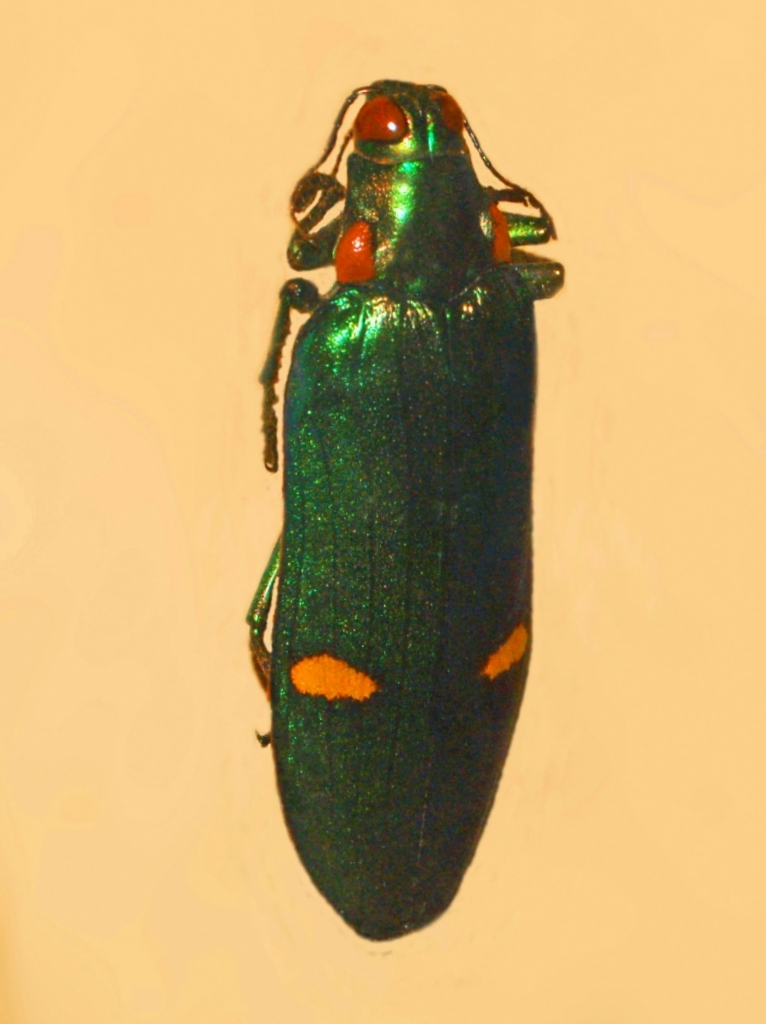
Megaloxantha bicolor from Java

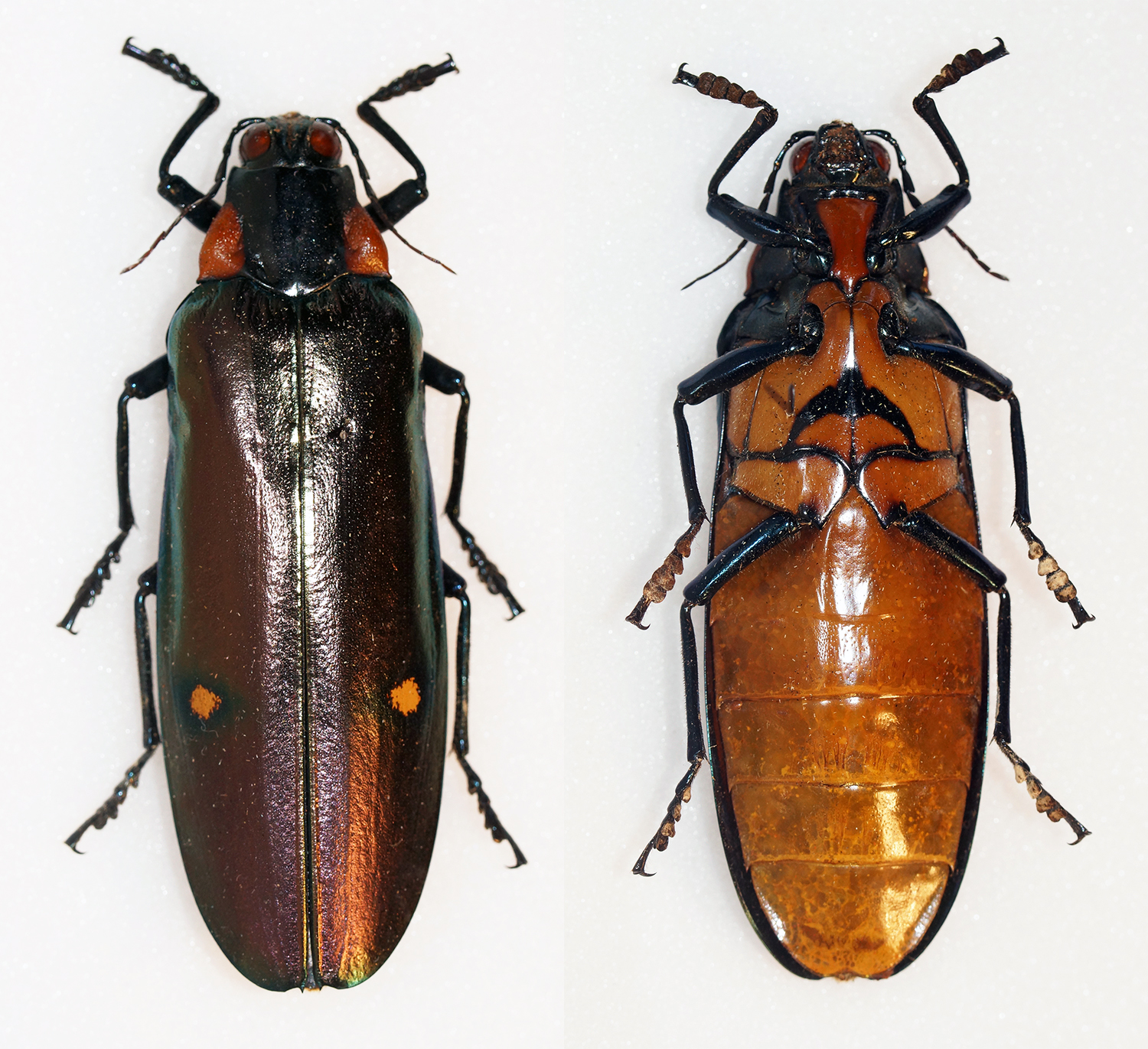
Megaloxantha bicolor porphyreus from Vietnam
