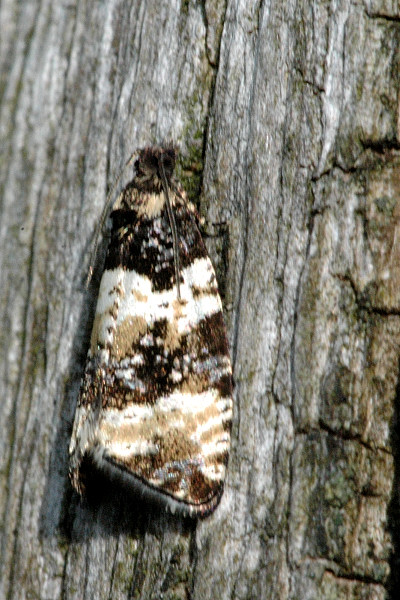

Scientific classification
- Kingdom: Animalia
- Phylum: Arthropoda
- Class: Insecta
- Order: Lepidoptera
- Family: Tortricidae
- Genus: Orthotaenia
- Species: O. undulana

Binomial name
- Orthotaenia undulana Denis & Schiffermüller, 1775

= Orthotaenia undulana =

Species of moth

Orthotaenia undulana is a moth of the family Tortricidae. It is found in the Palearctic realm.

The wingspan is 15–20 mm. It is light, beige and white with dark areas. When resting on a surface, it is well camouflaged and can resemble a bird's dropping. The ground color of the forewings is brownish or grayish, There is a light cross-band with fine brown lines. The wing tip is mostly white, but has small brown striae and spots and a larger brown mark along the outer edge. The hindwings are light brown.

The moth flies from May to mid-August.

The larvae feed on honeysuckle, Vaccinium, pine and birch.

== Notes ==
1. The flight season refers to Belgium and the Netherlands. This may vary in other parts of the range.
