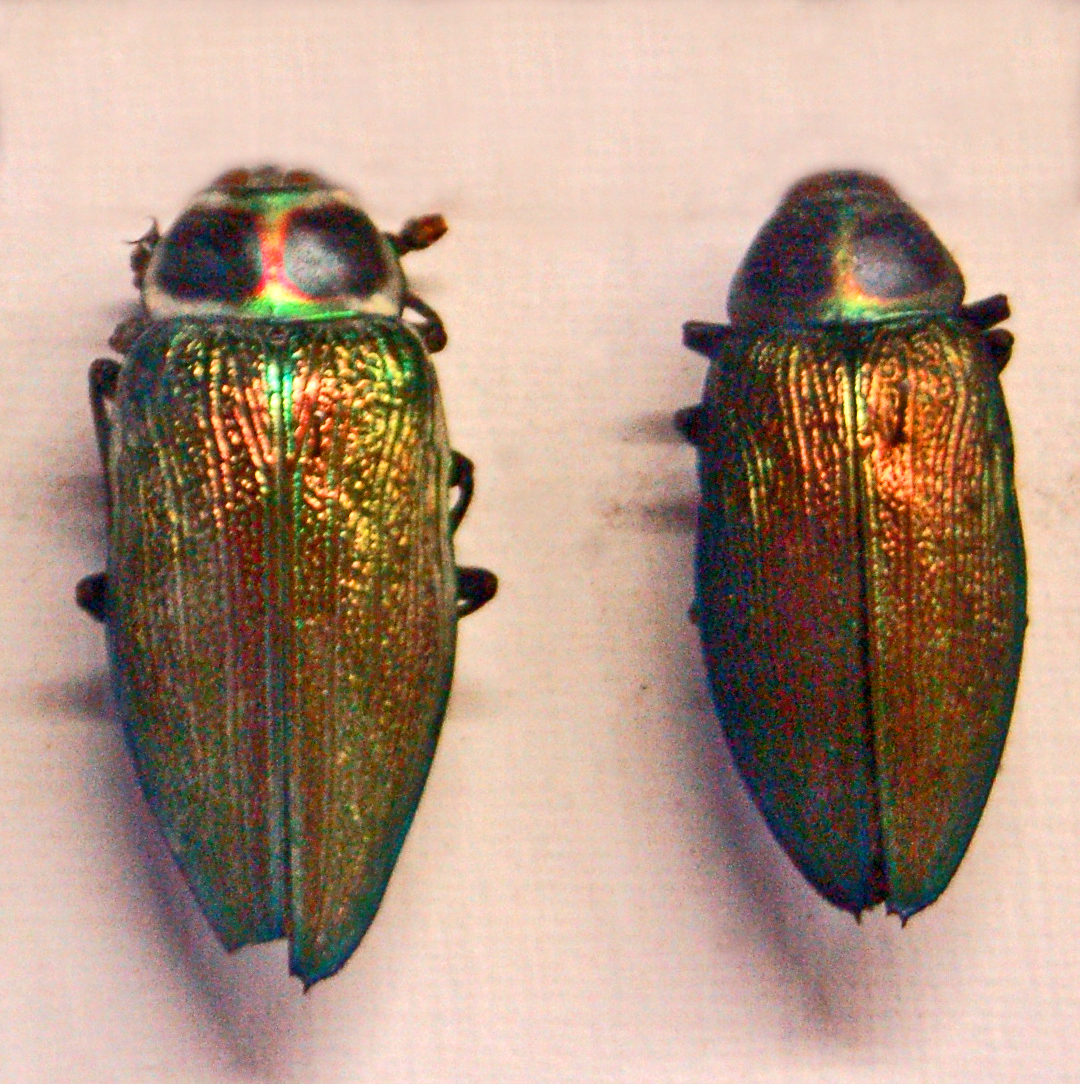
- Euchroma gigantea from Brazil, mounted specimen at National Museum (Prague)

Scientific classification
- Kingdom: Animalia
- Phylum: Arthropoda
- Class: Insecta
- Order: Coleoptera
- Suborder: Polyphaga
- Infraorder: Elateriformia
- Family: Buprestidae
- Tribe: Paraleptodemini
- Genus: Euchroma; Dejean, 1833

= Euchroma =

Genus of beetles

Euchroma is a genus of beetles in the family Buprestidae.

This genus has one species:

- Euchroma gigantea (Linnaeus, 1758)
