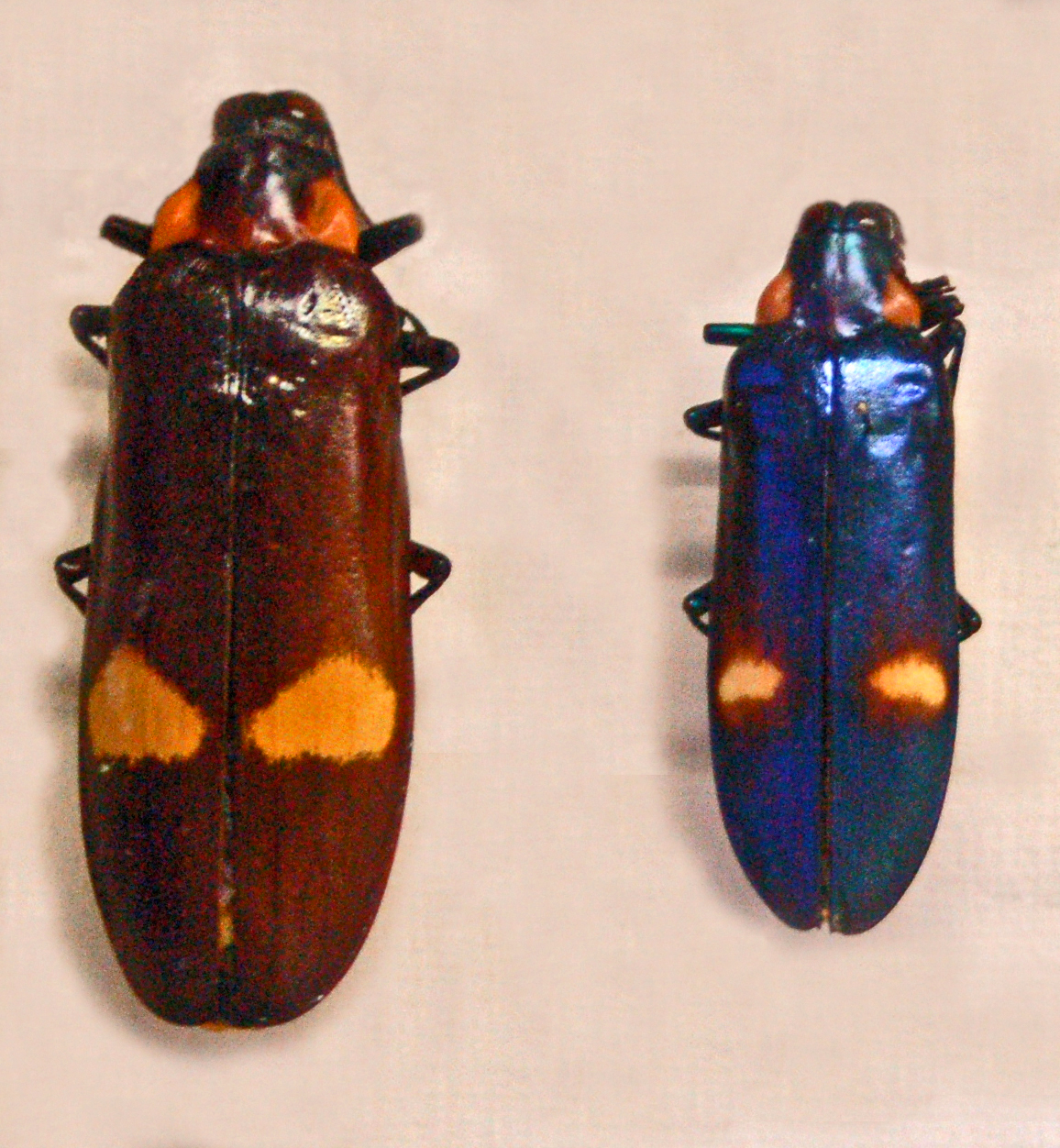
- Megaloxantha bicolor, mounted specimen at National Museum (Prague)

Scientific classification
- Kingdom: Animalia
- Phylum: Arthropoda
- Class: Insecta
- Order: Coleoptera
- Suborder: Polyphaga
- Infraorder: Elateriformia
- Family: Buprestidae
- Genus: Megaloxantha; Kerremans, 1902

= Megaloxantha =

Genus of beetles

Megaloxantha is a genus of beetles in the family Buprestidae, containing the following species:

- Megaloxantha bicolor (Fabricius, 1775)
- Megaloxantha concolor (Kurosawa, 1978)
- Megaloxantha daleni (van der Hoeven, 1838)
- Megaloxantha descarpentriesi (Kurosawa, 1978)
- Megaloxantha hemixantha (Snellen van Vollenhoven, 1864)
- Megaloxantha kiyoshii (Endo, 1995)
- Megaloxantha mouhotii (Saunders, 1869)
- Megaloxantha netscheri (Lansberge, 1879)
- Megaloxantha purpurascens (Ritsema, 1879)
