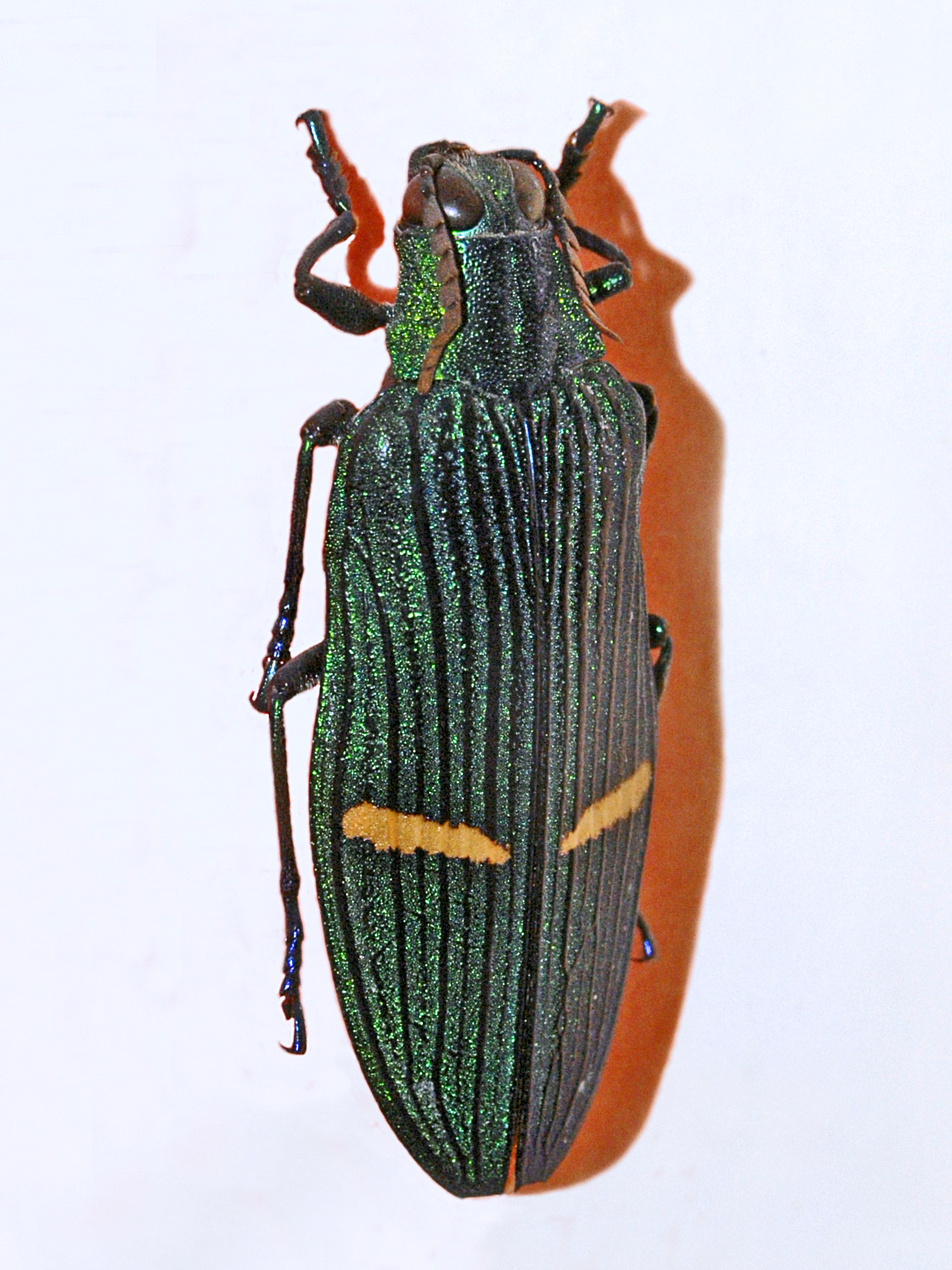
- Museum specimen of Catoxantha opulenta

Scientific classification
- Kingdom: Animalia
- Phylum: Arthropoda
- Class: Insecta
- Order: Coleoptera
- Suborder: Polyphaga
- Infraorder: Elateriformia
- Family: Buprestidae
- Subfamily: Chrysochroinae
- Genus: Catoxantha; Solier, 1833

= Catoxantha =

Genus of beetles

Catoxantha is a genus of beetles in the family Buprestidae, ranging from northeast India through Southeast Asia. The genus contains the following species:

- Catoxantha bonvouloirii Deyrolle, 1861
- Catoxantha eburnea Janson, 1874
- Catoxantha liouvillei Thery, 1923
- Catoxantha opulenta (Gory, 1832)
- Catoxantha pierrei Descarpentries, 1948
- Catoxantha purpurea (White, 1843)
