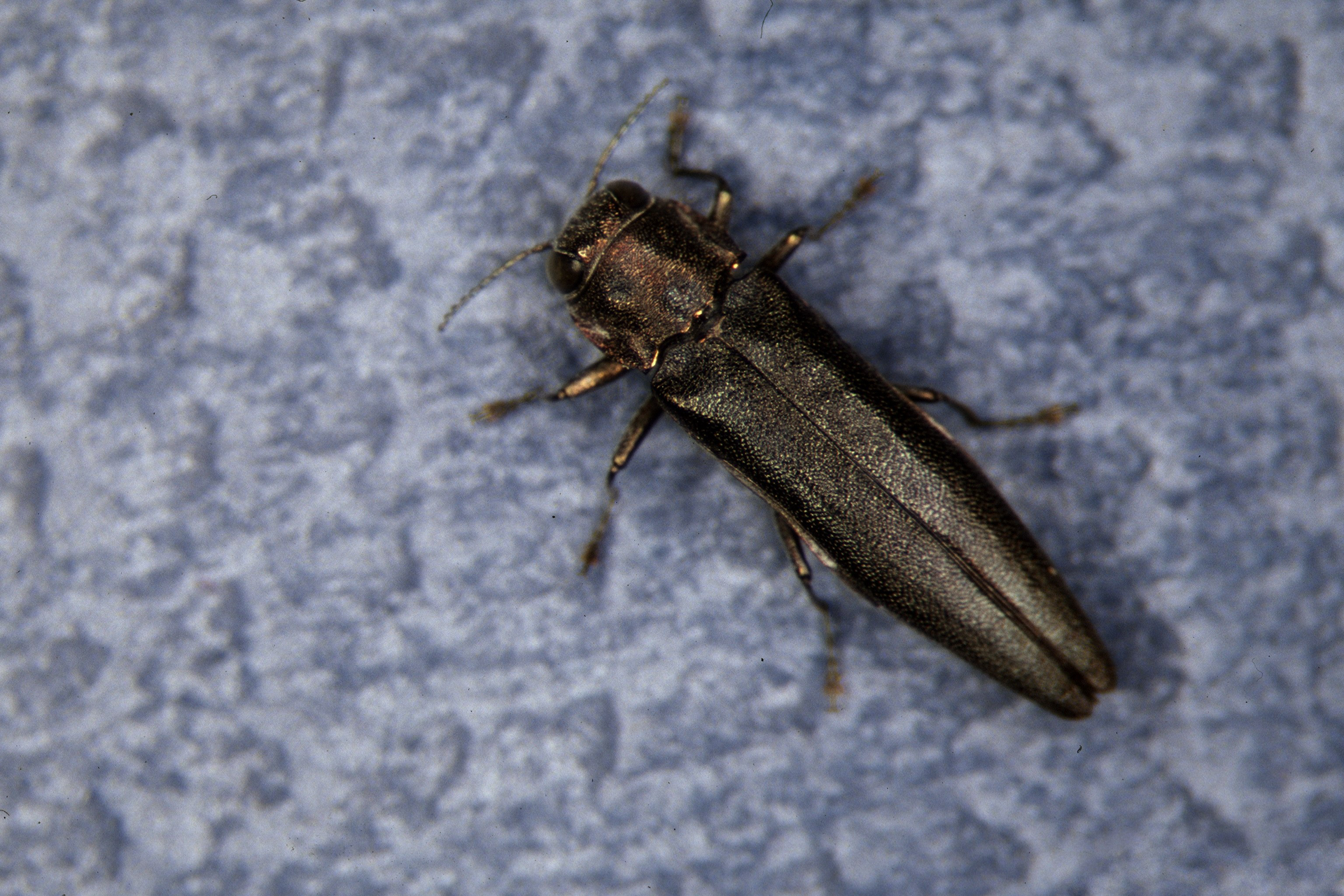
- Agrilus anxius

Scientific classification
- Kingdom: Animalia
- Phylum: Arthropoda
- Clade: Pancrustacea
- Class: Insecta
- Order: Coleoptera
- Suborder: Polyphaga
- Infraorder: Elateriformia
- Family: Buprestidae
- Subfamily: Agrilinae
- Tribe: Agrilini; Laporte, 1835

= Agrilini =

Tribe of beetles

Agrilini is a tribe of metallic wood-boring beetles in the family Buprestidae. There are at least 40 described genera in Agrilini.

== Subtribes and genera ==
Biolib lists four subtribes:

=== Agrilina ===
Auth.: Laporte, 1835

1. Agrilochyseus Théry, 1935
2. Agrilodia Obenberger, 1923
3. Agriloides Kerremans, 1903
4. Agrilus Curtis, 1825
5. Australodraco Curletti, 2006
6. Autarcontes Waterhouse, 1887
7. Bellamyus Curletti, 1997
8. Callipyndax Waterhouse, 1887
9. Dorochoviella Jendek, 2006
10. Malawiella Bellamy, 1990
11. Maublancia Bellamy, 1998
12. Mychommatus Murray, 1868
13. Nelsonagrilus Jendek, 2006
14. Omochyseus Waterhouse, 1887
15. Parakamosia Obenberger, 1924
16. Pilotrulleum Bellamy & Westcott, 1995
17. Sakalianus Jendek, 2007
18. Sarawakita Obenberger, 1924
19. Sjoestedtius Théry, 1931

=== Amorphosternina ===
Auth.: Cobos, 1974

1. Amorphosternoides Cobos, 1974
2. Amorphosternus Deyrolle, 1864
3. Bergidora Kerremans, 1903
4. Diadora Kerremans, 1900
5. Diadorina Cobos, 1974
6. Helferina Cobos, 1956

=== Amyiina ===
Auth.: Holyński, 1993

1. Amyia Saunders, 1871
2. Euamyia Kerremans, 1903
3. Pareumerus Deyrolle, 1864

=== Rhaeboscelidina ===
Auth.: Cobos, 1976

1. Paragrilus Saunders, 1871
2. Rhaeboscelis Chevrolat, 1838
3. Velutia Kerremans, 1900

=== Genera incertae sedis ===
1. Deyrollius Obenberger, 1922
2. Eumerophilus Deyrolle, 1864
3. Lepismadora Velten in Velten & Bellamy, 1987
4. Nickerleola Obenberger, 1923
5. Parasambus Descarpentries & Villiers, 1966
6. Pseudagrilodes Obenberger, 1921
7. Pseudagrilus Laporte, 1835
8. Sambus Deyrolle, 1864
9. Wendleria Obenberger, 1924
