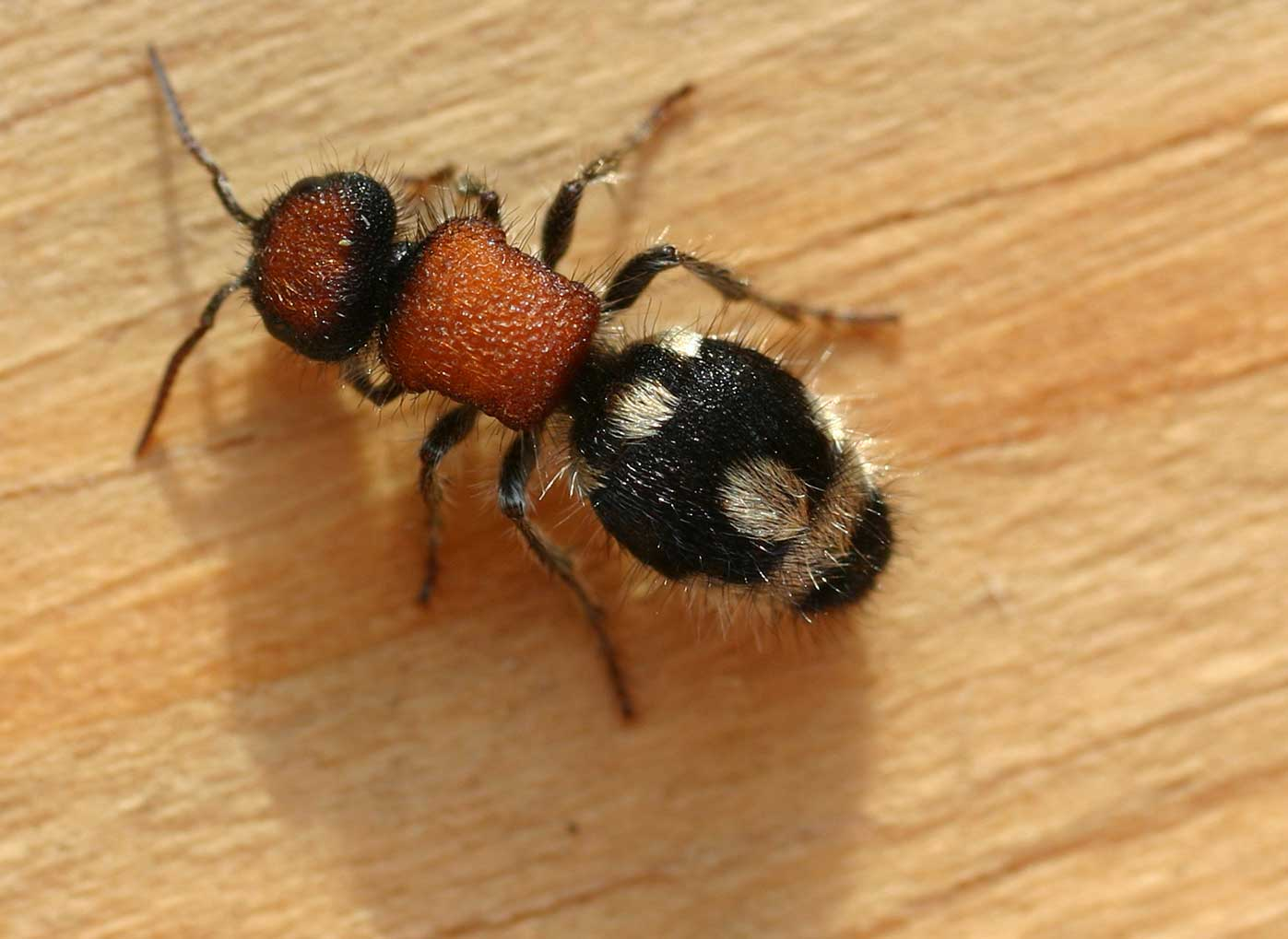
- Ronisia barbara

Scientific classification
- Kingdom: Animalia
- Phylum: Arthropoda
- Clade: Pancrustacea
- Class: Insecta
- Order: Hymenoptera
- Family: Mutillidae
- Genus: Ronisia; Costa, 1858

= Ronisia (wasp) =

Genus of wasps

Ronisia is a genus of hymenopteran insects in the family of velvet ants.

The scientific name of the genus was published in 1858 by Achille Costa, for Ronisia torosa from Italy, which Costa considered as unique. Later, others considered those to be the same as the earlier Mutilla barbara (Linnaeus, 1758). Costa later dropped usage of the genus name Ronisia and adopted usage of the genus Mutilla. In 1899, William Harris Ashmead further reclassified some Mutillidae, treating Ronisia as a current (i.e. valid) genus in the family Mutillidae.

== Species ==
- Ronisia albertvillensis (Bradley & Bequaert, 1923) – DR Congo
- Ronisia andromeda (Péringuey, 1898) – South Africa, Ethiopia, Zimbabwe etc.
- Ronisia angonina (Bischoff, 1920) – Central African Republic
- Ronisia barbara (Linnaeus, 1758) – Algeria, Egypt, Italy, Libya, Malta, Mauritania, Morocco, Spain, Tunisia
- Ronisia barbarula (Petersen, 1988) – Morocco, Portugal, Spain
- Ronisia basidens (Bischoff, 1920) – DR Congo
- Ronisia bequaerti (Bischoff, 1920) – DR Congo
- Ronisia bodenheimeri (Invrea, 1950) – Israel
- Ronisia bolivari (Mercet, 1915) – DR Congo, Nigeria
- Ronisia brachyptera (Bischoff, 1920) – Tanzania
- Ronisia brutia (Petagna, 1787) – Europe (Widespread), Georgia, Iran, Italy, Kazakhstan, Morocco, Romania, Russia (West), Tunisia, Turkey, Ukraine
- Ronisia callirhoe (Péringuey, 1898) – South Africa
- Ronisia citernii (Magretti, 1899) – Ethiopia
- Ronisia clausi (Bischoff, 1920) – Tanzania
- Ronisia crudelis (Smith, 1879) – South Africa
- Ronisia elmira (Péringuey, 1899) – Zimbabwe
- Ronisia ghilianii (Spinola, 1843) – Algeria, France, Greece, Italy, Morocco, Portugal, Spain, Tunisia
- Ronisia glauce (Péringuey, 1898) – South Africa
- Ronisia idonea (André, 1901) – Chad, Yemen
- Ronisia idoneaemorpha (Bischoff, 1920) – DR Congo, South Africa
- Ronisia immaculata (Bischoff, 1920) – Tanzania
- Ronisia katangana (Bischoff, 1920) – DR Congo
- Ronisia kondowensis (Bischoff, 1920) – Malawi
- Ronisia maculosa (Olivier, 1811) – Egypt, Libya
- Ronisia marcella (André, 1901) – Botswana, Zimbabwe
- Ronisia marocana (Olivier, 1811) – Algeria, Egypt, France, Israel, Italy, Libya, Malta, Morocco, Spain, Syria, Tunisia, Turkey
- Ronisia melanotica (Bischoff, 1920) – Malawi, South Africa
- Ronisia metella (André, 1901) – South Africa
- Ronisia nyikana (Bischoff, 1920) – Kenya
- Ronisia parasinuata Invrea, 1965 – Israel
- Ronisia penetrata (Smith, 1879) – Ethiopia, Kenya, Somalia, South Africa, Tanzania, Zambia
- Ronisia philomela (Péringuey, 1899) – Namibia
- Ronisia puescheli (Bischoff, 1920) – Namibia
- Ronisia pygidialis (Gerstaecker, 1870) – Tanzania (Zanzibar)
- Ronisia raffrayi (Radoszkowski, 1876) – Ethiopia, Senegal
- Ronisia robecchii (Magretti, 1892) – Somalia
- Ronisia scorteccii (Invrea, 1939) – Libya, Somalia
- Ronisia straba (Gerstaecker, 1870) – Zanzibar
- Ronisia striata Bradley & Bequaert, 1923 – Cameroon, DR Congo
- Ronisia trispilota (Sichel & Radoszkowski, 1870) – Zimbabwe
- Ronisia vassei (Bischoff, 1920) – Mozambique
- Ronisia wabonina (Bischoff, 1920) – Ethiopia, Kenya, South Africa
- Ronisia wahrmani Invrea, 1965 – Israel

Else:

- Ronisia coelebs Nonveiller in FAO, 1975 – Cameroon, Nigeria nom. nud. / Nonveiller 1980; nom. nud.
- Ronisia elegans Nonveiller in FAO, 1975 – Cameroon, nom. nud. / Nonveiller 1980; nom. nud.
- Ronisia humilis Nonveiller in FAO, 1975 – Cameroon, Nigeria, nom. nud.
- Ronisia impressiventris Nonveiller in FAO, 1975 – Cameroon, nom. nud. / Nonveiller 1980; nom. nud.
