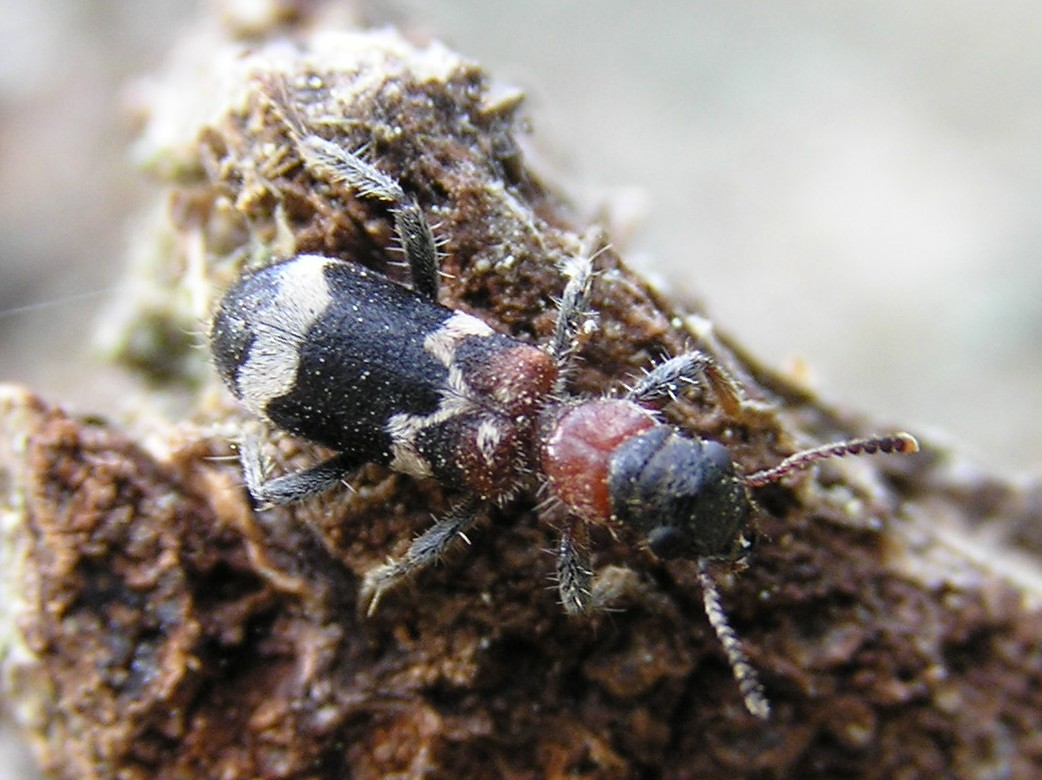

Scientific classification
- Kingdom: Animalia
- Phylum: Arthropoda
- Class: Insecta
- Order: Coleoptera
- Suborder: Polyphaga
- Infraorder: Cucujiformia
- Family: Cleridae
- Genus: Thanasimus
- Species: T. formicarius

Binomial name
- Thanasimus formicarius Linnaeus

= Thanasimus formicarius =

Species of beetle

Thanasimus formicarius, the ant beetle or European red-bellied clerid, is a medium size insect, rather soft-bodied, with strong mandibles that can tear between the hard sclerotized integument of bark beetles. Larvae and adults are common predators of bark beetles in Europe.

== Life cycle ==
The adults overwinter at the base of conifers, rarely of deciduous trees. They emerge in the spring and fly to lower parts of trees to hunt bark beetles. Their common prey are pine bark beetles Tomicus piniperda and T. minor, and the European spruce bark beetle, Ips typographus. Often they are seen waiting for their prey on the bark of fallen pine or spruce trees. Both ant beetles and bark beetles are attracted to monoterpenes from the damaged areas of the fallen trees. Stacked wood is especially attractive due to the monoterpene volatiles. The ant beetles are also attracted to specific pheromone components of bark beetles therefore they often fall into bark beetle pheromone traps. The larvae enter the scolytid galleries and feed on the immature stages of the bark beetles. The larvae grow very slowly, spending two years in the larval stage, and pupate in the fall in niches in the outer bark. Adults of T. formicarius live 4 to 10 months.

Males and females mate repeatedly, with many different partners throughout the season. Mating is short, and the copulation precedes a chase and a firm grasp of the female with the male mandibles on her pronotum.

The females lay eggs from April to June. Usually they produce 20 to 30 eggs that they lay in bark crevices and in the vicinity of the bark of pine trees running tunnel of the bark beetle. The pink-colored larvae hatch after about a week and live under the bark, where they are predators of bark beetle larvae, eggs and pupae, but also feed on other insects living under the bark. In pursuit of their prey, they are also very quick and very skilled at moving the bark beetle corridors, where they can run backwards.

Before pupation, the larvae form an oval chamber which they line with mucus under the bark. The following spring the beetles emerge.

== Prey range ==
Thanasimus formicarius feeds on 27 bark-beetle species belonging to 15 genera (Agrilus, Dendroctonus, Dryocoetes, Hylastes, Hylesinus, Hylurgops, Hylurgus, Ips, Leperesinus, Orthotomicus, Pityogenes, Pityokteines, Polygraphus, Scolytus, Tomicus and Trypodendron) which infest coniferous (pine, spruce, larch, Douglas fir, and others), and broad-leaved trees (oak, ash, poplar, and others). It is known to prey on Agrilus biguttatus.

== Behaviour ==
The adults grab their prey with all their legs quickly so the prey can't run away. Then the beetle bites between the thorax and abdomen, or head and thorax to leverage out the soft succulent parts of a bark beetle. The whole feeding process takes only about 10 minutes. The clerids can feed on about 3 bark beetles per day for several days. It is interesting that once a clerid begins to feed it almost always finishes the process so it never wastes prey. Different experiments suggest that ant beetles prefer Pinus trees over Abies or Picea for oviposition. Some experiments suggested that bark thickness could be a critical factor limiting pupation of T. formicarius on spruce. Possible Batesian mimicry: The shape of the body and coloration of ant beetles resemble those of velvet ants from the genera Mutilla that can be seen on the same places with ant beetles. Velvet ants are famous for their painful stinging.
