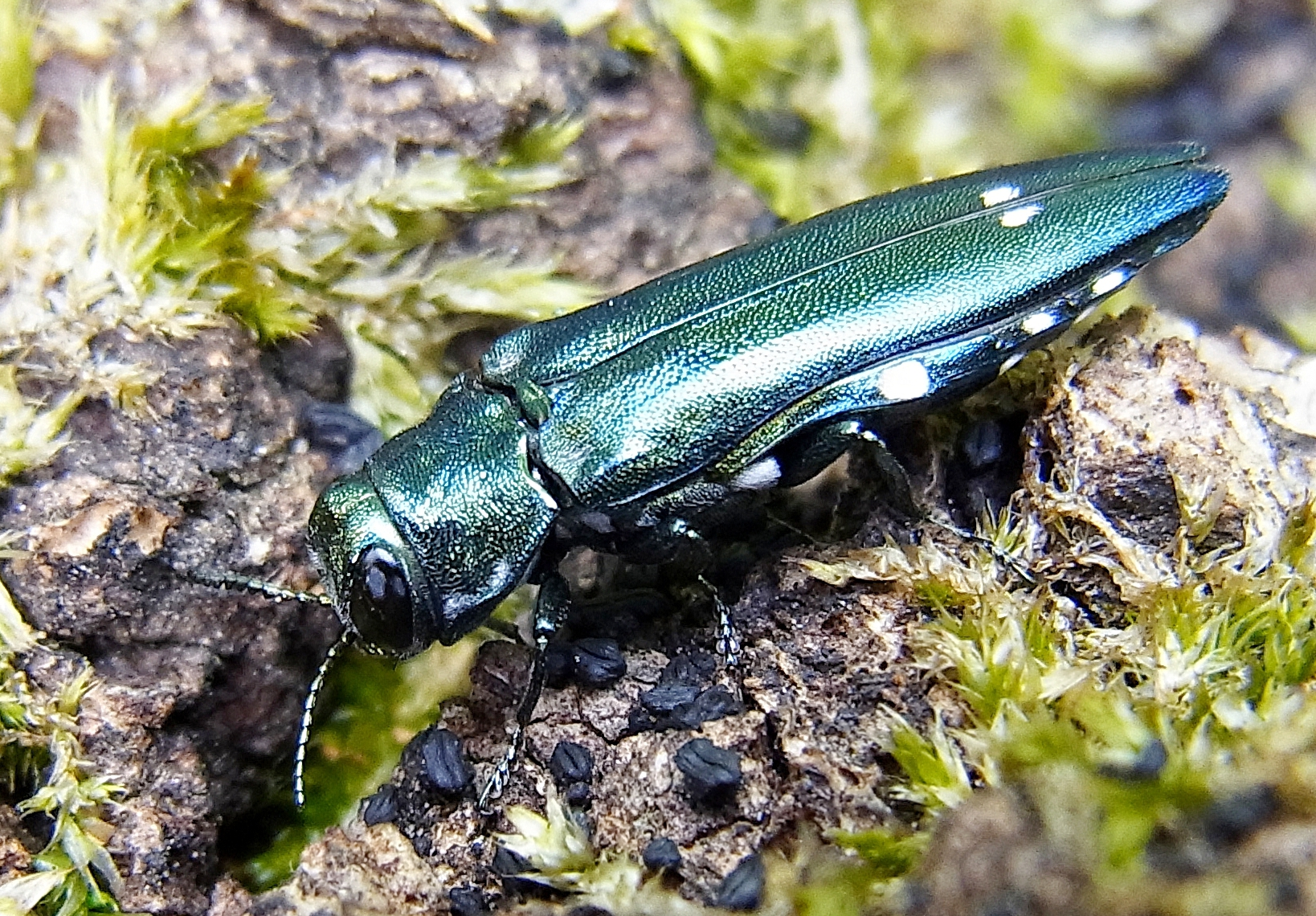

Scientific classification
- Kingdom: Animalia
- Phylum: Arthropoda
- Clade: Pancrustacea
- Class: Insecta
- Order: Coleoptera
- Suborder: Polyphaga
- Infraorder: Elateriformia
- Family: Buprestidae
- Subfamily: Agrilinae
- Tribe: Agrilini
- Subtribe: Agrilina
- Genus: Agrilus
- Species: A. biguttatus

Binomial name
- Agrilus biguttatus Fabricius

Synonyms
- Agrilus (Anambus) biguttatus (Fabricius, 1776); Agrilus bicolor Fleischer, 1930; Cucujus octoguttatus Geoffroy in Fourcroy, 1785; Buprestis pannonicus Piller & Mitterpacher, 1783; Agrilus pannonicus (Piller & Mitterpacher, 1783)

= Agrilus biguttatus =

Species of beetle

Agrilus biguttatus laying eggs

Agrilus biguttatus is a species of beetle in the family Buprestidae, the jewel beetles. Common names include oak splendour beetle, oak buprestid beetle, and two-spotted oak borer. This beetle is known as a pest that causes damage to oak trees and is a major factor in oak decline.

The adult beetle is 8 to 13 millimeters long. It is metallic green in color with a black or yellow cast. There is a pair of white spots on the inner edges of the elytra. The larva is a creamy white color and measures up to 43 millimeters in length. The first thoracic segment is enlarged. The grub is legless and has a pair of horns on its last abdominal segment. The beetles have an average lifespan of 2 months, but some may live upwards of 5 months.

== Taxonomy ==
Agrilus biguttatus is part of the subfamily Agrilinae, within the family Buprestidae in the order Coleoptera. Agrilinae is the largest, most genetically diverse subfamily in Buprestidae. It is made up of four tribes: Coraebini, Aphanisticini, Tracheini and Agrilini. Agrilus biguttatus is part of tribe Agrilini under the subtribe Agrilina. Based on when Buprestidae was estimated to have diverged, it suggests that its ancestors had a habit of wood-boring larval feeding. Nonetheless, some groups in Agrilinae shifted to eating leaves.

The Agrilus genus of buprestid beetles is known for its remarkable species diversity, with over three thousand species identified worldwide. These beetles' larvae typically mature inside the vascular tissues of trees or woody plants, showing a strong preference for specific host plants. Their method of development has been found to contribute to significant oak decline.

== Distribution and habitat ==
Agrilus biguttatus is widespread throughout Europe, reaching the northern borders of southern Sweden and the UK. North Africa, and Northern Asia. Adults can fly several kilometres but the species distribution is restricted by cool temperatures. Until the 1970s, these beetles were considered rare in the UK. In the mid 1990s, A. biguttatus had begun expanding from its native range in Denmark and the Netherlands. Researchers had proposed that the expansion is largely due to global warming because it tends to live in more temperate areas. The beetle inhabits many environments, including deserts, xeric shrublands, Mediterranean scrub, mixed forests, and temperate coniferous forests. It can also be transported to new areas with shipments of wood. While Agrilus biguttatus is not currently found in the United States, its introduction could pose a significant risk to US natural environments.

The main hosts of this insect are oak species, including English oak (Quercus robur), sessile oak (Q. petraea), downy oak (Q. pubescens), evergreen oak (Q. ilex), cork oak (Q. suber) and turkey oak (Q. cerris). The beetle can also be found on European beech (Fagus sylvatica) and chestnut (Castanea sativa).

In Europe, species such as A. sulcicollis, A. angustulus, and A. biguttatus have been identified as significant contributors to oak decline due to their development pattern. While some species prefer infesting trees with smaller stem diameters or developing in branch bark, A. biguttatus larvae typically grow within the bark of the main trunk.

== Lifecycle ==
=== Mating and host selection ===
Adult beetles usually complete pupation and emerge from May to July. These newly emerged adults typically move up to the canopy of mature oak trees to feed on oak foliage, sycamore and beech trees. Males choose their mates while flying. Laboratory studies have shown that they also use volatile cues, known as pheromones, to inform their choices and locate feeding and mating sites. The beetles were found to follow pheromones from fresh oak foliage to locate their host trees. Their antennae are able to respond to specific components of oak leaf odor—namely, (Z)-3-hexenal, (Z)-3-hexen-1-ol, (E)-2-hexenal, and (Z)-3-hexenyl acetate—to help them navigate their environments. After mating, mated females use olfactory signals to descend to the trunks and lay their eggs. They deposit eggs within cracks and crevices in the bark of suitable host trees, often between bark plates where larvae can easily tunnel through the oak tree to reach its vascular tissue. A majority of the beetle's life cycle occurs within the tissue of the mature oak.

Agrilus biguttatus prefers to reside in old oak trees of 30–40 cm in diameter with an inner bark thickness of 10–13 mm. While healthy trees can generally resist A. biguttatus infestations, female beetles tend to live in trees that are physiologically stressed, often as a result of drought conditions. Moisture within the inner bark tissues is critical for A. biguttatus larval development. Larvae typically feed toward the ground, because there is greater water content the lower it feeds in the tree stem. Additionally, they have been observed to lay new generations of eggs under those laid by previous generations on their host trees. The beetle has a brief period of time to invade the host. The window occurs between the time when drought conditions reduce the tree's resistance to infestation, and the time of the death of the tree, which severely reduces water content in vascular tissue. Ultimately, careful host selection can promote optimal larval development.

=== Larval development to adult emergence ===
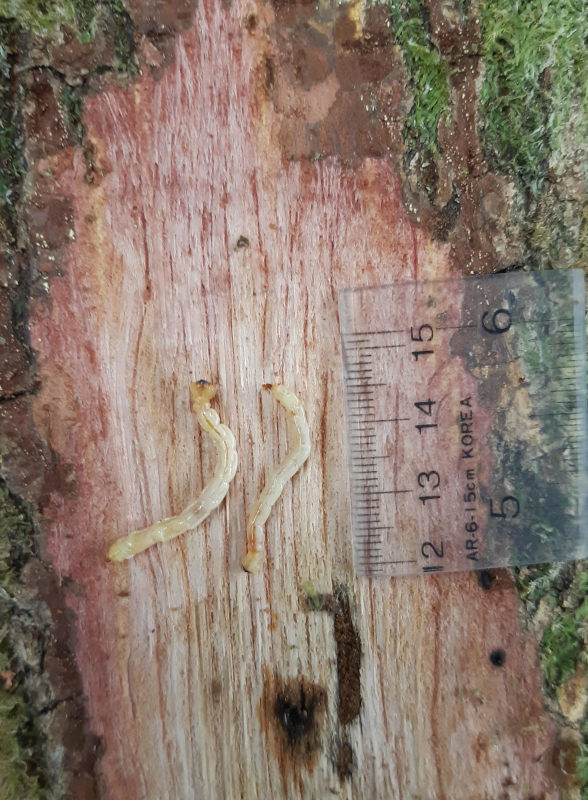

Under artificial conditions, beetles would lay soft-shelled eggs in clusters of up to thirty. Agrilus biguttatus show a preference for laying their eggs and allowing initial larval development to occur on the warmer, south-facing side of host trees. Temperature determines the rate of egg development, which has been observed to range from 2 to 6 weeks under laboratory conditions.

This species requires warmer temperatures for its development. A study measured the development rates of A. biguttatus in terms of the time it takes for the eggs, larvae, and pupae to reach adulthood. The development rates of eggs, larvae, and pupae have lower developmental thresholds of 12.1, 11.9, and 15.1 °C, respectively. Development rates displayed a positive relationship with temperature, meaning that as temperature increases, development rate also increases. Likewise, as the temperature decreases, development rate decreases. The study found evidence to support that the beetle's distribution is limited by its thermal requirements, and it may not be able to survive or reproduce effectively in cooler regions.

Newly hatched larvae burrow into the inner bark to feed. Their feeding behavior hollows out the tree, and they can create zigzag galleries up to 1.5 meters long, which results in partial girdling of the tree. As the larvae grow, A. biguttatus can widen from less than 1 millimeter to 3 to 4 millimeters in diameter. Larvae create galleries that twist irregularly in all directions. This behavior leads to structural abnormalities in the tree's cambium tissue. Moreover, branches and twigs at the top of the tree may die off, causing the crown to appear sparse with scantily clustered foliage. Eventually, if the damage is too severe, the tree can succumb to the larval activity and die.

The larva undergoes five instars during its development. Generation time, the time it takes for A. biguttatus to produce a generation, can change depending on location and varies between one or two years. Their life cycle is prominently influenced by local conditions, with temperature and health of the host tree being crucial factors. In laboratory settings, all larval samples must undergo a period of cold temperatures, to mimic overwintering, to progress in their development. This indicates that A. biguttatus must enter a state of "obligatory prepupal diapause", which they achieve through overwintering; otherwise they would die. The pupal overwinters by curling up inside pupal chambers located in the bark, which are 10.4 to 14.8 by 3 to 4.5 mm in size. Pupation happens in the spring, lasting about 14 days. Following pupation, the adult beetle emerges through a D-shaped exit hole, typically measuring 2.5 to 4 mm in diameter.

== Relationship with oak hosts ==
=== Interactions with humans and oak trees ===
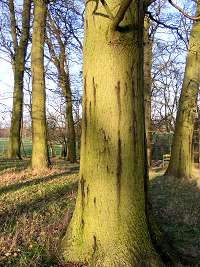
Damage of Acute Oak Decline shown on an Oak tree.

Beetles have a considerable impact on the decline of oak trees across Europe, a phenomenon known as acute oak decline (AOD). One of the major symptoms of AOD is the presence of black fluid seeping from cracks in the bark, which often leads to the tree's death within a few years. If given enough time without further infestation, they are likely to recover. However, A. biguttatus, considered a secondary pest to oak, poses a serious threat by invading weakened trees before they can undergo the process of recovery. Symptomatic oak trees often exhibit distinctive D-shaped exit holes from emerging A. biguttatus adults. The decline of oak trees in Europe is believed to have been exacerbated by warmer climates and drought, as those conditions are optimal for A. biguttatus growth and host invasion. Documented evidence shows Agrilus pest incidence in Germany, France, Hungary, Poland, and England, contributing significantly to the increase in tree mortalities.

=== Host defense ===
Oak trees have established physical defenses against wood-boring pests. Agrilus biguttatus often exploits weakened trees, and dark fluid is produced when bacteria enter the wounded oak bark. Presence of A. biguttatus has also been found to invite the pathogenic honey fungi, Armillaria, to grow in the stems of oak trees. Despite fluid leakage being a symptom of oak decline, mid-instar larvae have been observed to drown in their galleries from these excretions, thus minimizing their spread through the tree's vascular tissue. Robust callusing is a sign of the tree's health and its capacity to fend off attacks and recover. Furthermore, this defense is particularly effective against early larval instars, which have slower feeding and movement rates, enabling the host's calluses to suffocate them within the galleries.

== Relationship with surrounding environment ==
Due to its damaging effects on oak trees, efforts have been made to manage the A. biguttatus population. Common strategies for controlling this beetle in Britain include the following:

=== Removal of infested stems ===
Removing heavily infested stems, particularly those exhibiting sudden and rapid decline, significant foliage and twig loss, and signs of Agrilus presence like exit holes and galleries beneath the bark can help reduce the beetle population. This should ideally be carried out before the spring when new A. biguttatus adults emerge after they have completed larval development. Notably, to avoid creating sunny open areas that attract female beetles seeking oviposition sites, planting trees that can provide shade, particularly along the southern side of woodlands, can be beneficial. This strategy aims to discourage A. biguttatus beetles from laying eggs there.

=== Insecticides ===
When insecticides are applied to the tree's surface before adult emergence, there is evidence supporting its efficacy in controlling beetles in their pupal chambers within the outer bark. However, the need for repeat applications and the cost of the treatment can be burdensome. Additionally, insecticides used on oaks could lead to the death of many other non-pests. Research is being conducted on the use of semi chemicals, natural behavior-modifying chemicals that mimic the volatiles emitted by oak tree hosts, to more effectively manage the beetle population, as there are no known baits or traps for A. biguttatus.

=== Predation ===
Woodpeckers have been shown to prey on older larvae. Creating environments that appeal to woodpeckers can aid in controlling buprestid populations. Additionally, larvae of A. biguttatus can be parasitized by wasps that locate larvae within the bark and lay multiple eggs near them, which provides the wasp larvae a food source after hatching. Common predators of A. biguttatus include the European red-bellied clerid (Thanasimus formicarius), and the wasp Dolichomitus imperator from the family Ichneumonidae. Wasps are currently being researched as a potential biocontrol method in the USA.
