= Maublancia =

Maublancia may refer to:

- Maublancia (beetle), a genus of insects in the family Buprestidae
- Maublancia (fungus), a genus of fungi in the family Microthyriaceae
