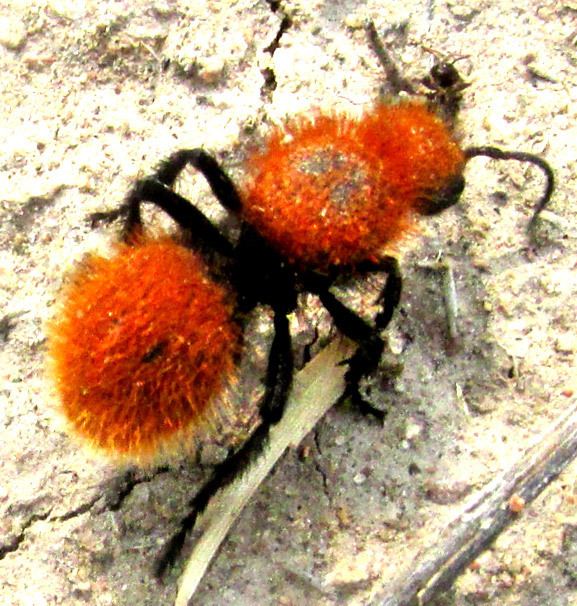
- Dasymutilla vestita, wingless female

Scientific classification
- Kingdom: Animalia
- Phylum: Arthropoda
- Clade: Pancrustacea
- Class: Insecta
- Order: Hymenoptera
- Family: Mutillidae
- Genus: Dasymutilla
- Species: D. vestita

Binomial name
- Dasymutilla vestita (Lepeletier, 1845)

Synonyms
- List: Mutilla vestita Lepeletier; Dasymutilla cotulla Mickel, 1928; Dasymutilla homole Mickel, 1928; Dasymutilla vandala Mickel, 1928; Dasymutilla zelaya (Blake, 1871); Ephuta californica var. euchroa Cockerell, 1897; Mutilla aspasioides Dalla Torre, 1897; Mutilla fulvohirta Cresson, 1865; Mutilla montezumae; Sphaerophthalma aspasia Cameron, 1895; Sphaerophthalma townsendi Cockerell, 1894

= Dasymutilla vestita =

Species of insect

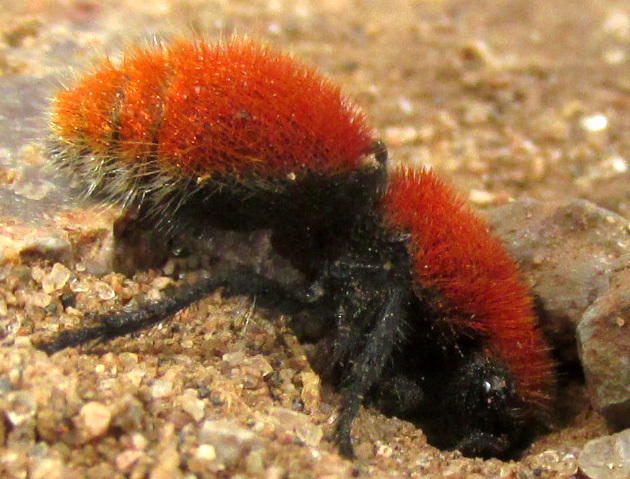
Female digging in sand

Dasymutilla vestita is a species of wasp belonging to the velvet ant Family, the Mutillidae.

== Discription ==
As in all the family, the females are wingless and look like very large, hairy ants, while males are winged and look like regular wasps. Beyond that, here are features helping with the identification of Dasymutilla vestita:

- They are strikingly red and black. From above they look all red, except for black legs, the narrow mid-section, eyes and antennae. From the side they look all red on top except for the mid-section, and all black below.
- There is a definite, narrow constriction between the hind section, the metasoma, and the middle section, or mesosoma.
- Body length is about 9.5 mm long.

== Distribution ==
In Canada Dasymutilla vestita occurs in the provinces of Alberta and Saskatchewan. In the USA it is found throughout the western states as far east as Arkansas and Texas. In Mexico it is seen in the drier parts of the northern, eastern and central states south into Oaxaca, but is absent from the Yucatan Peninsula. In the USA it is regarded as one of the most common and widespread velvet ant species.

== Habitat ==
In the southwestern USA, Dasymutilla vestita has been recognized as an indicator species for pinyon-juniper woodlands in which the pinyon pines were dying from drought and bark beetle outbreaks. An image on this page shows an individual in an overgrazed field with much exposed, eroding dirt in upland central Mexico at an elevation of about 1,900m, (6200 ft).

== Life history ==
Winged male velvet ants do not sting. They are seen on flowers where they feed. Female velvet ants usually spend almost their entire lives alone, and are seen searching for underground nests in which to lay their eggs.

=== Reproduction ===
Little is published about the life history of this or other Dasymutilla species, but known species of velvet ant, instead of digging or building their own nests, enter the nests of other arthropods and lay their eggs on or near developing pupae of the host. The wasp larva eats the host pupa, killing it, before it itself pupates and emerges from the nest as an adult velvet ant. In most velvet ant species the female may have a hard job finding a host for her eggs.

=== Teratogenesis in Dasymutilla vestita ===
Structural abnormalities of the body's development producing individuals sometimes known as "monstrosities", a process known as teratogenesis, is known to occur in Dasymutilla vestita. An individual of the species has been documented in which the left half of the head was female, while the right was male; the left half of the middle part was male with a wing while the right half was female and wingless, and; the left half of the rear end was male, while the right half was female.

=== Defenses ===
When female velvet ants are alone and out in the open hunting and searching for host nests, they are easy to see because they are fast moving and bear bright colors. The striking colors warn predators to stay away, and constitute a case of Müllerian mimicry, in which dangerous species mimic one another's warning signals to their mutual benefit. In North America, velvet ant species can be divided into 8 distinct "Müllerian mimicry rings", based on their distributions and colors. Dasymutilla vestita, with its black body with flaming orange fuzz belongs to the "Texan mimicry ring" comprising 14 velvet ant species in two genera.

Velvet ants are sometimes called cow killers because of their painful stings. On the average, velvet ant venom is considerably less toxic than a honeybee's.

Velvet ant bodies possess very hard and slippery exoskeletons. It takes about 11 times more force to smash a velvet ant than a honeybee.

These and other defenses, such as the velvet ant's "squeaking" when captured, and an "alarm secretion" released when attacked, make predators wary of attacking velvet ants. A study using captured wild lizards from whom food had been withheld for 3 days prior to testing found that when Dasymutilla vestita was introduced intp the observation tanks of 5 of these hungry lizards, only one attacked the velvet ant.

== Taxonomy ==
In 1845 when Amédée Louis Michel le Peletier formally described and named Dasymutilla vestita under the basionym of Mutilla vestita, he remarked that his specimen was from Mexico, and from the museum of "M. Spinola". M. Spinola was the Italian entomologist Maximilian Spinola.

=== Etymology ===
The genus name Dasymutilla is from the Latin dasy, taken from the Greek δασύς, meaning "hairy". The -mutilla part refers to the genus Mutilla, having species similar to the hairier Dasymutilla species.

The species name vestita is Latin meaning "clothed", and by extension refers to the unusually dense hairiness clothing the species.
