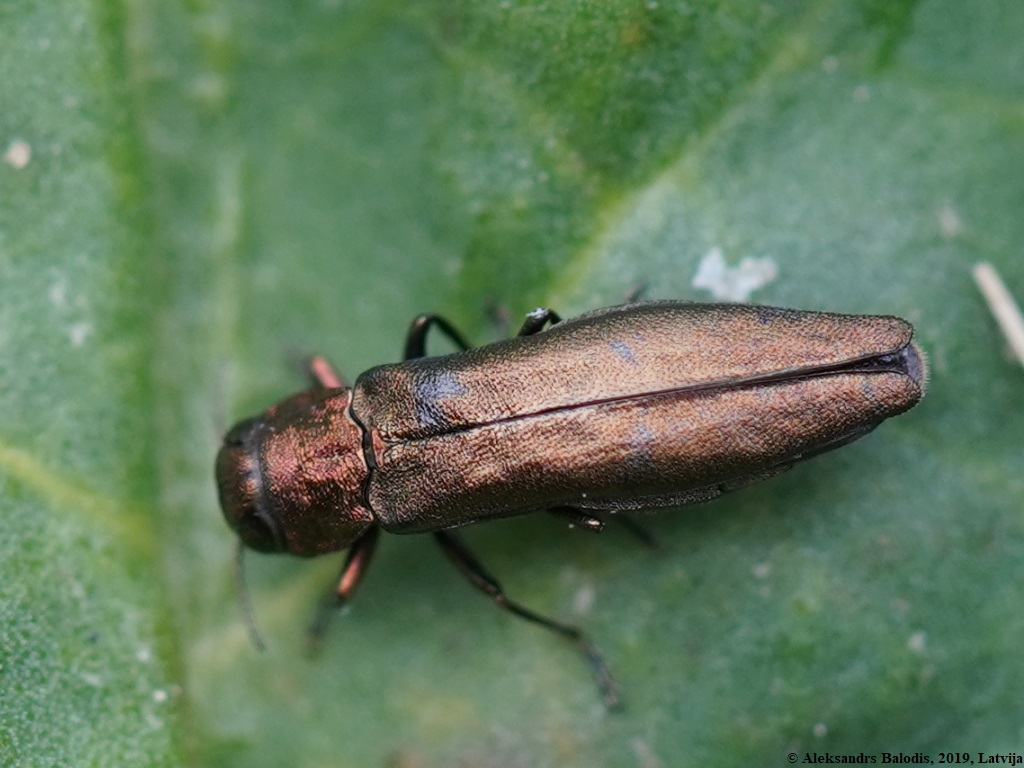
- Agrilus cuprescens

Scientific classification
- Domain: Eukaryota
- Kingdom: Animalia
- Phylum: Arthropoda
- Class: Insecta
- Order: Coleoptera
- Suborder: Polyphaga
- Infraorder: Elateriformia
- Family: Buprestidae
- Tribe: Agrilini
- Subtribe: Agrilina
- Genus: Agrilus
- Species: A. cuprescens

Binomial name
- Agrilus cuprescens (Ménétries, 1832)

Synonyms
- Agrilus aurichalceus Redtenbacher, 1849; Agrilus rubicola Abeille de Perrin, 1897

= Agrilus cuprescens =

Species of beetle

Agrilus cuprescens, known generally as the rose stem girdler or bronze cane borer, is a species of metallic wood-boring beetle in the family Buprestidae. It is found in Europe and Northern Asia (excluding China) and North America.

== Subspecies ==
These six subspecies belong to the species Agrilus cuprescens:

- Agrilus cuprescens amethystopterus Semenov, 1890
- Agrilus cuprescens caenus Obenberger, 1924
- Agrilus cuprescens calcicola Obenberger, 1916
- Agrilus cuprescens chrysoderes Abeille de Perrin, 1891
- Agrilus cuprescens cuprescens (Ménétriés, 1832)
- Agrilus cuprescens paludicola Krogerus, 1923
