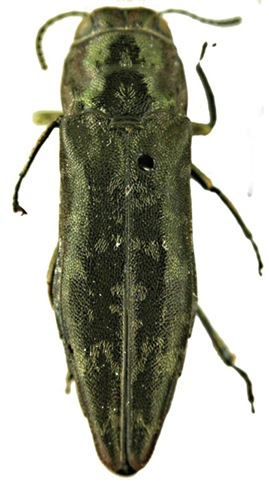
- A lectotype specimen

Scientific classification
- Kingdom: Animalia
- Phylum: Arthropoda
- Clade: Pancrustacea
- Class: Insecta
- Order: Coleoptera
- Suborder: Polyphaga
- Infraorder: Elateriformia
- Family: Buprestidae
- Genus: Agrilus
- Species: A. celebicola

Binomial name
- Agrilus celebicola Obenberger, 1924

= Agrilus celebicola =

Species of jewel beetles

Agrilus celebicola is a species of jewel beetle that belongs to the tribe Agrilini. It is known from the Island of Sulawesi (Celebes) in Indonesia.

== Taxonomy ==
This species was described from an unknown number of syntypes. A study by Eduard Jendek in 2013 revised the occipitalis species-group and proposed that this species along with A. connexus, A. cupricauda, A. evinadus and many others to be taxonomic synonyms of Agrilus occipitalis.
