= Paragrilus tenuis =

Scientific classification
- Domain: Eukaryota
- Kingdom: Animalia
- Phylum: Arthropoda
- Class: Insecta
- Order: Coleoptera
- Suborder: Polyphaga
- Infraorder: Elateriformia
- Family: Buprestidae
- Genus: Paragrilus
- Species: P. tenuis

Binomial name
- Paragrilus tenuis (LeConte, 1863)

Synonyms
- Paragrilus lecontei Obenberger, 1924

Species of beetle

Paragrilus tenuis is a species of metallic wood-boring beetle in the family Buprestidae. It is found in North America. Larvae are associated with plants in the genus Hibiscus.
