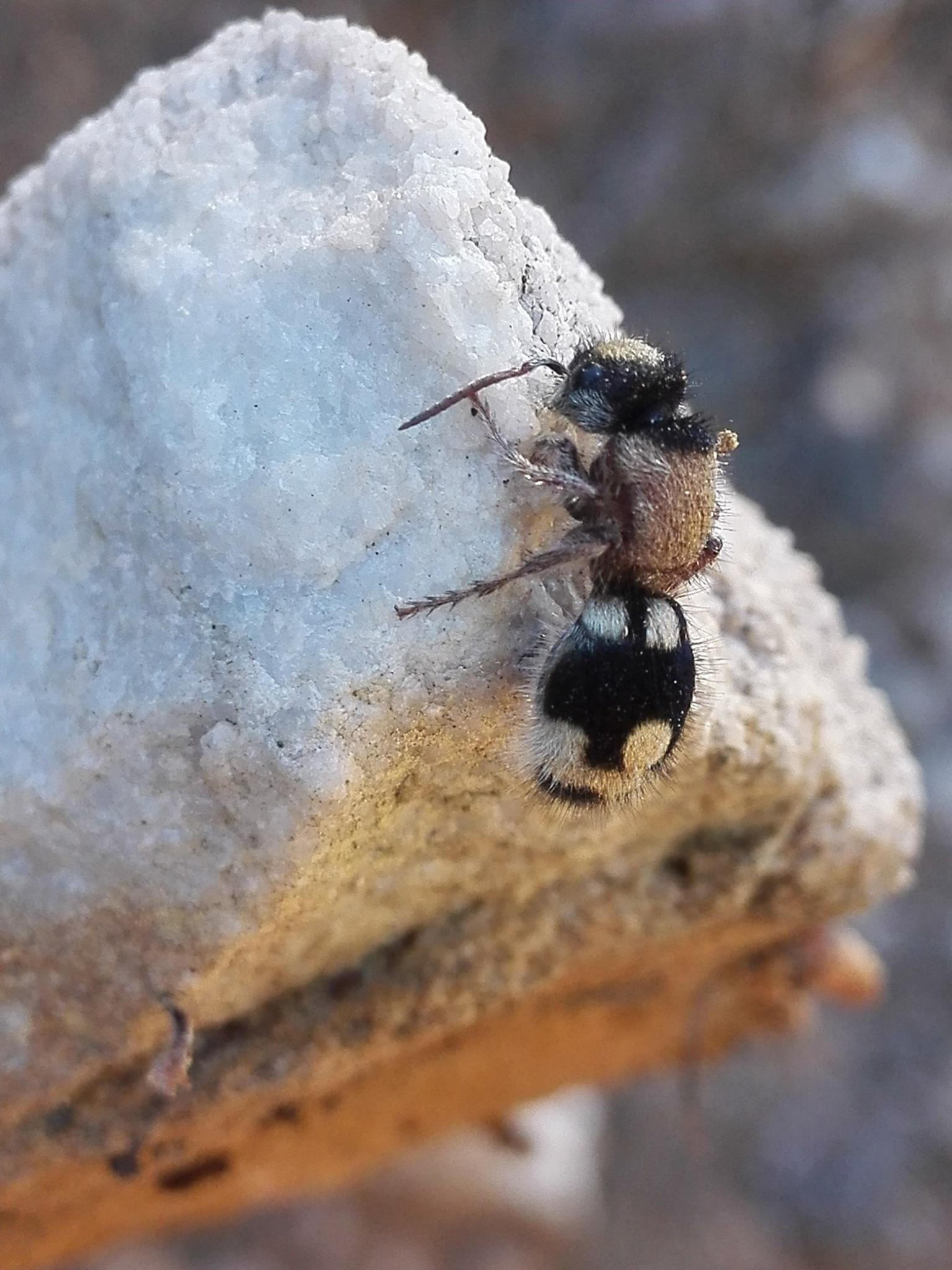
- Female of Ronisia ghilianii

Scientific classification
- Kingdom: Animalia
- Phylum: Arthropoda
- Class: Insecta
- Order: Hymenoptera
- Family: Mutillidae
- Genus: Ronisia
- Species: R. ghilianii

Binomial name
- Ronisia ghilianii Spinola, 1843

= Ronisia ghilianii =

Species of wasp

Ronisia ghilianii is a species of wasp belonging to the family Mutillidae.

Females of Ronisia barbarula and Ronisia ghilianii look very similar, but the white hair spot on the head is roundish in ghilianii but distinctly triangular in barbarula.
