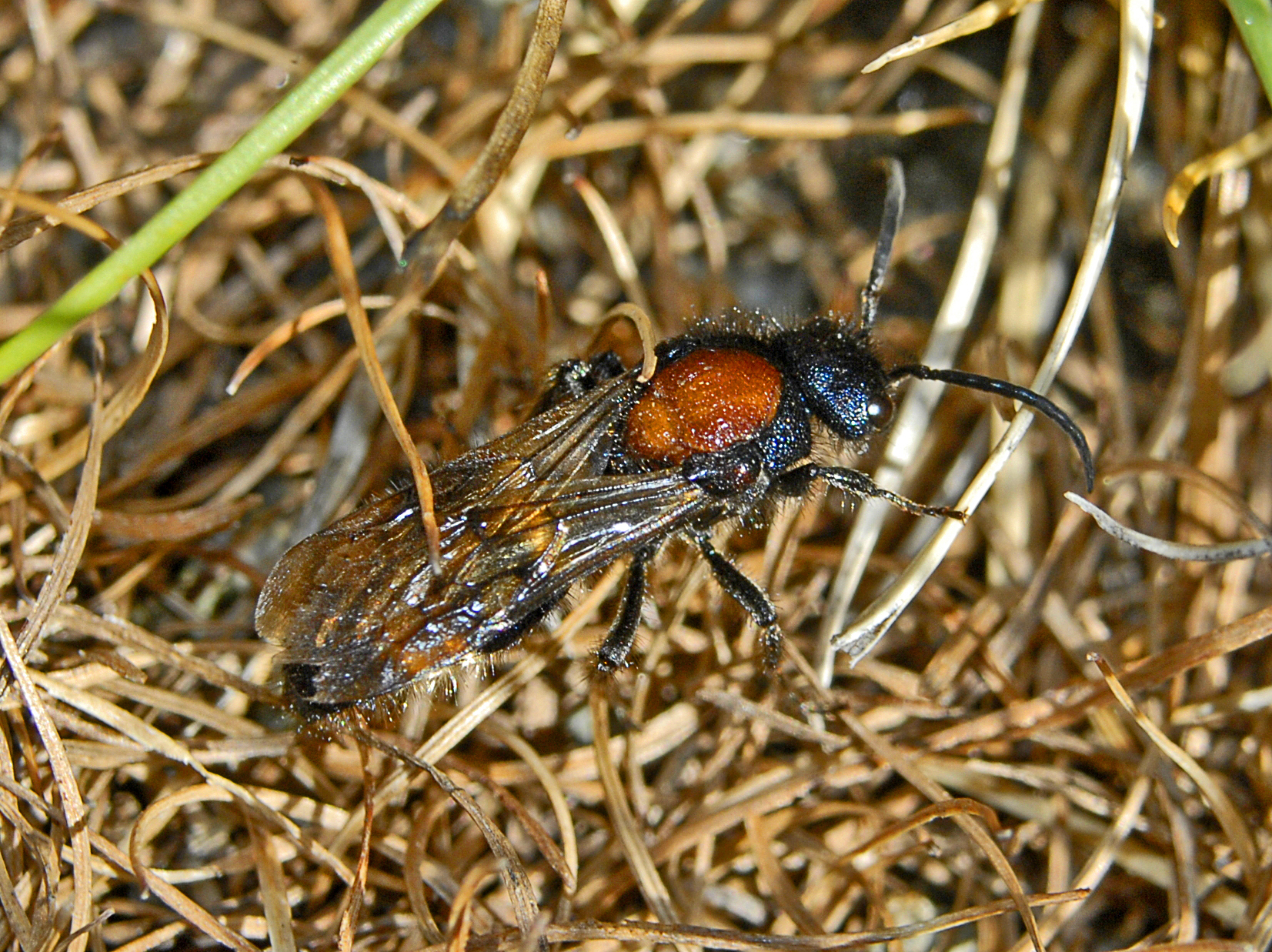
- Male of Mutilla europaea

Scientific classification
- Kingdom: Animalia
- Phylum: Arthropoda
- Clade: Pancrustacea
- Class: Insecta
- Order: Hymenoptera
- Family: Mutillidae
- Genus: Mutilla
- Species: M. europaea

Binomial name
- Mutilla europaea Linnaeus, 1758

Synonyms
- Apis aptera Uddman, 1753; Mutilla similis Harris, 1782; Mutilla schaefferi Schrank, 1802; Mutilla coerulans Lepeletier, 1845; Mutilla cyanea Lepeletier, 1845; Mutilla panzeri Lepeletier, 1845; Mutilla obscura Nylander, 1847; Mutilla kaschiriensis Baer, 1848; Mutilla laevigata Sichel & Radoszkowski, 1870; Mutilla notomelas André, 1902

= Mutilla europaea =

Species of wasp

Mutilla europaea, the large velvet ant, is a species of parasitoid wasps belonging to the family Mutillidae. It is a parasitoid on various species of bumblebees and is found in Europe, Asia, and North Africa.

== Description ==
The males of M. europaea are dark red on the apex of mandible and the thorax. The first and second terga on the abdomen have bands of long silver setae, that on the second tergum may either be interrupted or wavy. The sides of the second tergum are clothed in long silver setae. The tip of the abdomen and the rest of the body are covered with long black, straight setae. The legs are largely covered in black setae, with a scattering of silver setae. Some variation occurs, and in some specimens, silver dominate setae dominate the hind legs, some males are completely black. In females, the mesonotum is red, and sometimes extends to parts of the pronotum. The first tergum has a band of long, silver setae, the remaining terga are spotted with silver setae along their flanks; they can be close together. The legs have some short, adjecting black and silver setae. The presence of the setae, or bristles, gives rise to the name "velvet ant".

== Distribution ==
Mutilla europaea is a widespread species found in most of Europe and reaches as far as China in the east. It also occurs in Central Asia, the Middle East, and North Africa. In Great Britain, it is locally distributed, mainly in the south and east, but has recently been recorded as far north as Aberdeenshire.

== Habitat and biology ==
Mutilla europaea occurs in heaths, moors, chalk grassland, and woodland. In England, it appears to have its closest association with lowland heaths, and the females are most often recorded running across sandy paths.

Like the other wasps in the family Mutillidae, M. europaea wasps are parasitoids of the resting stages of other insects. Various bumblebees in the genus Bombus are the main hosts for this species, although it has also been infrequently reported in the hives of the honey bee (Apis mellifera). Once she enters the host nest, the female lays an egg into a cocoon, which contains either the prepupae or young pupae of the bee. The wasp larva consumes the pupae, before spinning a cocoon within the host's cocoon. The size of the wasp that emerges from its cocoon is partly dependent on the size of the host, with wasps hosted by honeybees smaller than those using bumblebees as hosts. When it emerges, the adult wasp feeds on the honey stores of the host bees. The males die soon after emergence in the autumn, but the females hibernate over the winter, sometimes using the host nest for this. They also hibernate at the roots of low vegetation.

The winged males of M. europaea are occasionally recorded feeding on nectar, the flowers from which they have been recorded feeding include wild parsnip. Females have been recorded visiting flowers, but this is very unusual.

Mutilla europaea wasps are also cleptoparasites, and they have been recorded sneaking into the nests of the paper wasp Polistes biglumis to rob them of their food stores. They are thought to be able to do this due to an ability to disguise their own scent, which means that the Polistes wasps cannot detect them. When threatened, these wasps can stridulate by rubbing a raised structure, called the plectrum, which is found on the underside of the second tergum, over rows of dense narrow ridges at the base of adjoining segment. These wasps are also known to be very strong and armoured with a thick skin, and in North America, related species have been reported to be able to force their escape from the mouths of predators such as lizards and frogs. They have a painful sting, too, and this has given rise to the colloquial name "cow killer", which is completely inappropriate, as although they have a painful sting, their venom is much less toxic than the venom of a honeybee. They are, however, not aggressive and only sting people if handled.
