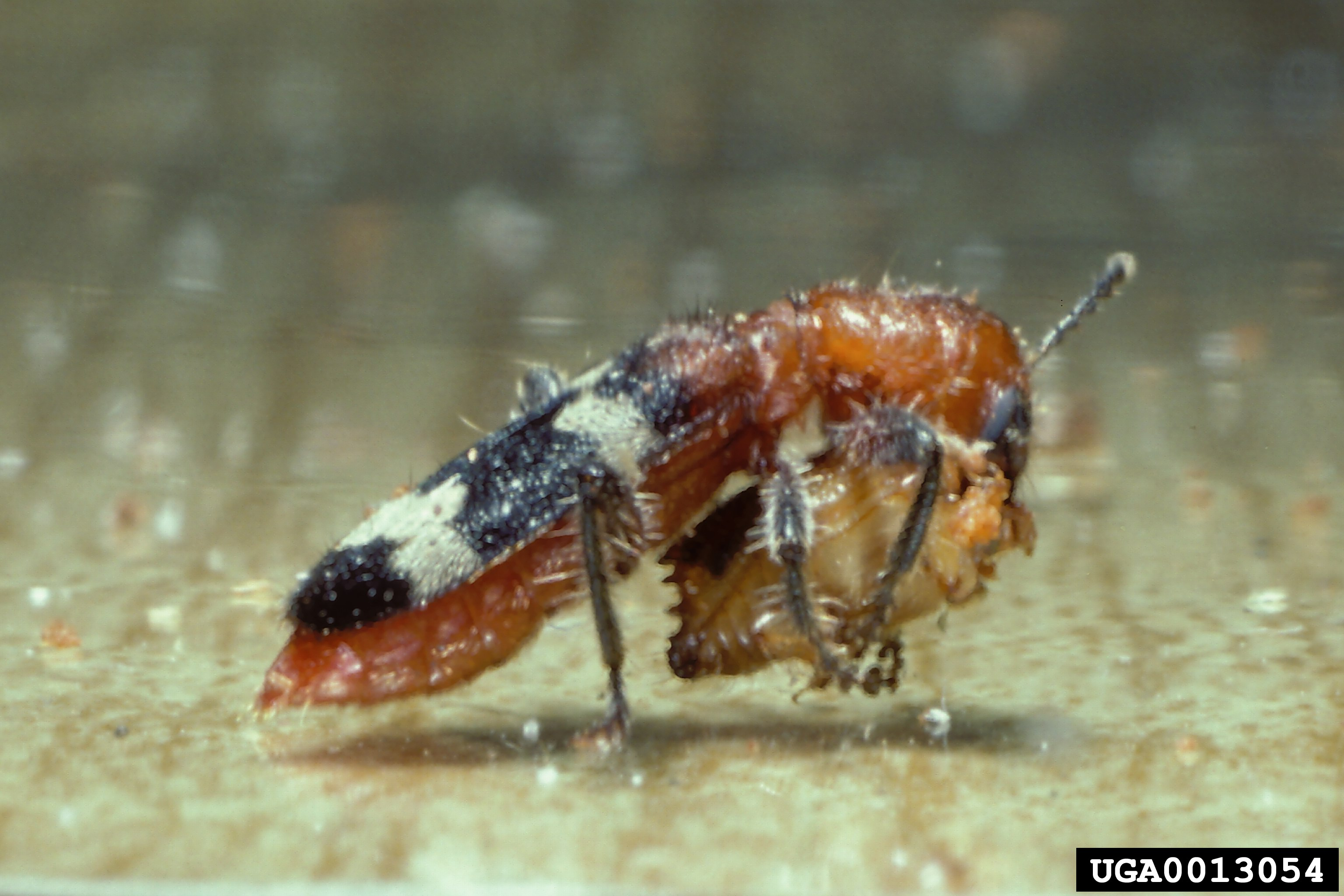
- Thanasimus dubius

Scientific classification
- Kingdom: Animalia
- Phylum: Arthropoda
- Class: Insecta
- Order: Coleoptera
- Suborder: Polyphaga
- Infraorder: Cucujiformia
- Family: Cleridae
- Subfamily: Clerinae
- Genus: Thanasimus; Latreille, 1806

= Thanasimus =

Genus of beetles

Thanasimus is a genus of checkered beetles in the family Cleridae. There are about six described species in Thanasimus.

== Species ==
These six species belong to the genus Thanasimus:

- Thanasimus dubius (Fabricius, 1776)^{i c g b} (dubious checkered beetle, American bark beetle destroyer, checkered beetle predator)
- Thanasimus femoralis (Zetterstedt, 1828)^{g}
- Thanasimus formicarius (Linnaeus, 1758)^{g b} (European red-bellied clerid)
- Thanasimus repandus (Horn, 1871)^{i c g}
- Thanasimus trifasciatus (Say, 1825)^{i c g b}
- Thanasimus undatulus (Say, 1835)^{i c g b}

Data sources: i = ITIS, c = Catalogue of Life, g = GBIF, b = Bugguide.net
