= Agrilochyseus =

Agrilochyseus borgmeieri

Scientific classification
- Kingdom: Animalia
- Phylum: Arthropoda
- Clade: Pancrustacea
- Class: Insecta
- Order: Coleoptera
- Suborder: Polyphaga
- Infraorder: Elateriformia
- Family: Buprestidae
- Genus: Agrilochyseus; Thery, 1935
- Species: A. borgmeieri

Binomial name
- Agrilochyseus borgmeieri Thery, 1935

Genus of jewel beetles

Agrilochyseus is a genus of jewel beetle that belongs to the tribe Agrilini. The only species that belongs to this genus is Agrilochyseus borgmeieri making it monotypic.
