= Diadora (beetle) =

Scientific classification
- Kingdom: Animalia
- Phylum: Arthropoda
- Class: Insecta
- Order: Coleoptera
- Suborder: Polyphaga
- Infraorder: Elateriformia
- Family: Buprestidae
- Subfamily: Agrilinae
- Tribe: Agrilini
- Genus: Diadora; Kerremans, 1900

Genus of beetles

Diadora is a genus of beetles in the family Buprestidae, containing the following species:

- Diadora lutea (Kerremans, 1897)
- Diadora undulata Obenberger, 1922
- Diadora willineri Cobos, 1972
