= Paragrilus =

Scientific classification
- Kingdom: Animalia
- Phylum: Arthropoda
- Class: Insecta
- Order: Coleoptera
- Suborder: Polyphaga
- Infraorder: Elateriformia
- Family: Buprestidae
- Tribe: Agrilini
- Genus: Paragrilus; Saunders, 1871

Genus of beetles

Paragrilus is a genus of beetles in the family Buprestidae, the jewel beetles.

These beetles are native to the Americas. They are dark in color and not very shiny in texture. At least one group of species in this genus is commonly found on plants of the genus Sida.

Species include:

- Paragrilus abjunctus Kerremans, 1903
- Paragrilus acuticostis Obenberger, 1924
- Paragrilus aeneifrons Kerremans, 1896
- Paragrilus aeneus Obenberger, 1924
- Paragrilus aeraticollis Waterhouse, 1889
- Paragrilus akersorum Hespenheide, 2002
- Paragrilus alutaceidorsis Obenberger, 1924
- Paragrilus angulaticollis Waterhouse, 1889
- Paragrilus argentinus Obenberger, 1924
- Paragrilus azureus Hespenheide, 2002
- Paragrilus bergi Kerremans, 1903
- Paragrilus beskei (Gory & Laporte, 1837)
- Paragrilus bicarinicollis Cobos, 1976
- Paragrilus bolivianus Moore, 1986
- Paragrilus bonariensis Obenberger, 1924
- Paragrilus brasiliensis (Gory & Laporte, 1837)
- Paragrilus bruchi Kerremans, 1903
- Paragrilus burkei Hespenheide, 2002
- Paragrilus cavinus Fisher, 1925
- Paragrilus coerulans Obenberger, 1924
- Paragrilus crassus Kerremans, 1897
- Paragrilus credulus Kerremans, 1897
- Paragrilus cupricollis Cobos, 1976
- Paragrilus dormitzeri Obenberger, 1924
- Paragrilus dubius Saunders, 1871
- Paragrilus embrikiellus Obenberger, 1936
- Paragrilus exiguus (Chevrolat, 1835)
- Paragrilus fallorum Hespenheide, 2002
- Paragrilus gestroi Obenberger, 1924
- Paragrilus heliocarpi Hespenheide, 2002
- Paragrilus holomelas Fisher, 1925
- Paragrilus ignotus Obenberger, 1924
- Paragrilus impressus (Chevrolat, 1835)
- Paragrilus kheili Obenberger, 1924
- Paragrilus laevicollis Waterhouse, 1889
- Paragrilus lesueuri Waterhouse, 1889
- Paragrilus major Kerremans, 1897
- Paragrilus modicoides Obenberger, 1924
- Paragrilus modicus (Solier, 1833)
- Paragrilus moldenkei Hespenheide, 2002
- Paragrilus mrazi Obenberger, 1924
- Paragrilus nanulus (Mannerheim, 1837)
- Paragrilus nickerli Obenberger, 1924
- Paragrilus nigritus Kerremans, 1899
- Paragrilus obliquus Kerremans, 1903
- Paragrilus oculatus Cobos, 1976
- Paragrilus opacipennis Fisher, 1925
- Paragrilus paulensis Obenberger, 1924
- Paragrilus percautus (Kerremans, 1903)
- Paragrilus peruvianus (Gory & Laporte, 1837)
- Paragrilus pulchellus Fisher, 1925
- Paragrilus punctifrons Obenberger, 1924
- Paragrilus purpureus Fisher, 1925
- Paragrilus reichei (Gory, 1841)
- Paragrilus rugatulus Thomson, 1879
- Paragrilus similis Obenberger, 1924
- Paragrilus strandi Obenberger, 1924
- Paragrilus sulcicollis Kerremans, 1903
- Paragrilus tenuis (LeConte, 1863)
- Paragrilus transitorius Waterhouse, 1889
- Paragrilus trifoveolatus Waterhouse, 1889
- Paragrilus vianai Obenberger, 1947
- Paragrilus vicinus Waterhouse, 1889
