= Acute oak decline =

Disease of oak trees

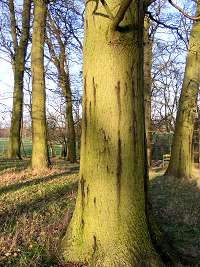
- Stem bleeding in a tree affected with Acute oak decline
- Causal agents: Brenneria goodwinii and Gibsiella quercinecans
- Hosts: Oaks
- Distribution: United Kingdom

Acute oak decline (AOD) is a disease that infects oak trees originally described in the UK. It mainly affects mature oak trees of over 50 years old of both Britain's native oak species: the pedunculate oak (Quercus robur) and the sessile oak (Quercus petraea). The disease is characterised by the trees bleeding or oozing a dark fluid from small lesions or splits in their bark. Unlike chronic oak decline, acute oak decline can lead to the death of trees within 4 to 5 years of symptoms appearing. The number of trees affected is thought to number in the low thousands, with a higher number of infected trees being found in the Midlands.

== Causes of the disease ==
Acute Oak Decline is a complex tree decline disease that cannot be explained by a single cause. It results from a combination of environmental factors weakening the trees and some biotic factors.

=== Bacterial pathogens ===
Two different species of bacteria, Brenneria goodwinii, Gibbsiella quercinecans, are repeatedly found in the decaying tissues of trees with AOD. Laboratory experiment confirmed that these two species have the ability to cause tree tissue necrosis and possess virulence genes commonly found in plant pathogens. In addition to these two bacterial pathogens, other microbes present in AOD affected trees are different from non-infected ones.

=== Bark-boring beetle ===
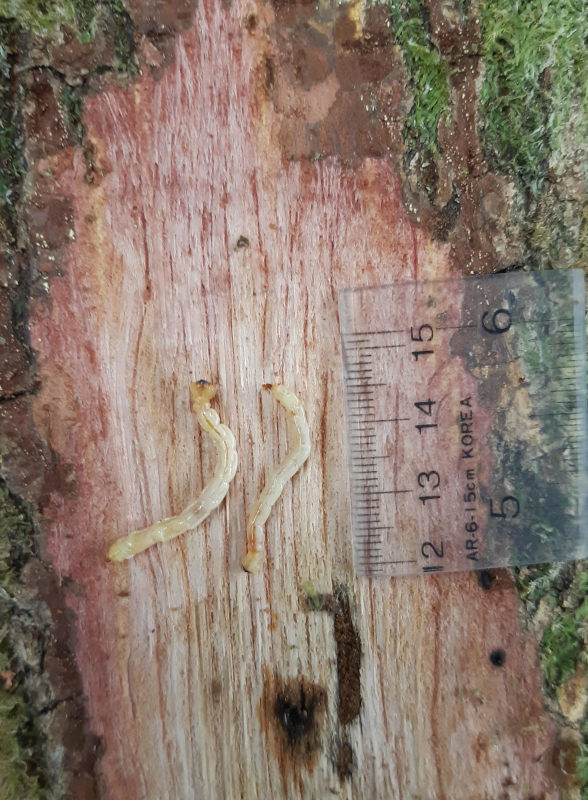
Two months old Agrilus biguttatus larvae.

Most trees affected by AOD will display exit holes and galleries caused by the larvae of the two-spotted oak borer Agrilus biguttatus. Larvae of A. biguttatus and the bacterial pathogens are acting together in causing the disease, with the bacteria being more virulent and causing larger lesions when trees are infected with beetle larvae. Researchers are still investing the potential role of A. biguttatus as a vector of the bacterial pathogens.

=== Drought and nutrient limitation ===
As other oak decline disease, AOD usually develops after the tree is being weakened by some environmental factors, called predisposing factors, such as water and nutrient limitation.

== See also ==
- Sudden oak death
- Ash dieback
- Dutch elm disease
- Kauri dieback
