= Lepismadora =

Conservation status
- Critically Imperiled (NatureServe)

Scientific classification
- Kingdom: Animalia
- Phylum: Arthropoda
- Class: Insecta
- Order: Coleoptera
- Suborder: Polyphaga
- Infraorder: Elateriformia
- Family: Buprestidae
- Subfamily: Agrilinae
- Tribe: Agrilini
- Genus: Lepismadora; Velten, 1987
- Species: L. algodones

Binomial name
- Lepismadora algodones Velten, 1987

Genus of beetles

Lepismadora is a monotypic genus of beetles in the family Buprestidae, the jewel beetles. It contains the single species Lepismadora algodones, which is known by the common name Algodones sand jewel beetle. It is endemic to California in the United States, where it has been collected only from the Algodones Dunes in Imperial County.

The beetle is no more than 7 millimeters long. It is elongated oval in shape and covered in a coat of scaly hairs, especially on the underside. It has large eyes and hairy antennae and legs. Among the collected specimens, females are slightly larger and thicker than males. The coloration is variable; smaller males are coppery in color, larger males are a "brassy green", and females are generally brassy with a green tinge. The color also varies with the distribution of the hairs, the color changing as the hairs wear off. This beetle is most similar to genus Eudiadora.

Most adults have been found on fanleaf crinklemat (Tiquilia plicata), a desert plant. The larval host plant is unknown. Adults are active during the hottest hours of the day.
