= Australodraco =

Scientific classification
- Kingdom: Animalia
- Phylum: Arthropoda
- Clade: Pancrustacea
- Class: Insecta
- Order: Coleoptera
- Suborder: Polyphaga
- Infraorder: Elateriformia
- Family: Buprestidae
- Subfamily: Agrilinae
- Tribe: Agrilini
- Subtribe: Agrilina
- Genus: Australodraco; Curletetti, 2006
- Species: A. muelleri

Binomial name
- Australodraco muelleri (Théry, 1925)

Synonyms
- Agrilus muelleri Théry, 1925

Genus of beetles

Australodraco muelleri is a species of beetles in the family Buprestidae, from New Guinea; it is the only species in the genus Australodraco.
