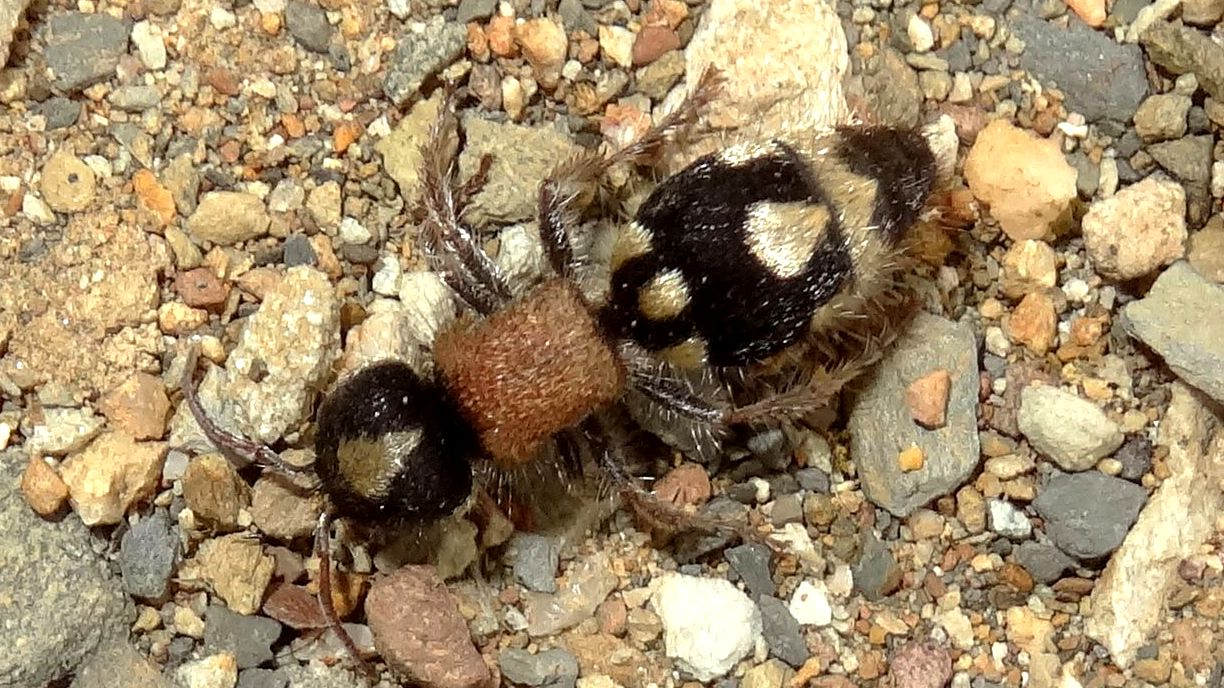
- Female of Ronisia barbarula

Scientific classification
- Kingdom: Animalia
- Phylum: Arthropoda
- Class: Insecta
- Order: Hymenoptera
- Family: Mutillidae
- Genus: Ronisia
- Species: R. barbarula

Binomial name
- Ronisia barbarula Petersen, 1988

= Ronisia barbarula =

Species of wasp

Ronisia barbarula is a species of wasp belonging to the family Mutillidae.

Females of Ronisia barbarula and Ronisia ghilianii look very similar, but the white hair spot on the head is roundish in ghilianii but distinctly triangular in barbarula.
