= Paragrilus rugatulus =

Scientific classification
- Domain: Eukaryota
- Kingdom: Animalia
- Phylum: Arthropoda
- Class: Insecta
- Order: Coleoptera
- Suborder: Polyphaga
- Infraorder: Elateriformia
- Family: Buprestidae
- Genus: Paragrilus
- Species: P. rugatulus

Binomial name
- Paragrilus rugatulus Thomson, 1879

Synonyms
- Paragrilus texanus (Schaeffer, 1904)

Species of beetle

Paragrilus rugatulus is a species of metallic wood-boring beetle in the family Buprestidae. It is found in Central America and North America.
