= Thanasimus undatulus =

Scientific classification
- Domain: Eukaryota
- Kingdom: Animalia
- Phylum: Arthropoda
- Class: Insecta
- Order: Coleoptera
- Suborder: Polyphaga
- Infraorder: Cucujiformia
- Family: Cleridae
- Genus: Thanasimus
- Species: T. undatulus

Binomial name
- Thanasimus undatulus (Say, 1835)

Synonyms
- Thanasimus monticola Wolcott, 1910

Species of beetle

Thanasimus undatulus is a species of checkered beetle in the family Cleridae. It is found in Central America and North America.

== Subspecies ==
These two subspecies belong to the species Thanasimus undatulus:

- Thanasimus undatulus nubilus (Klug, 1842)
- Thanasimus undatulus undatulus (Say, 1835)
