= Agrilodia =

Scientific classification
- Kingdom: Animalia
- Phylum: Arthropoda
- Clade: Pancrustacea
- Class: Insecta
- Order: Coleoptera
- Suborder: Polyphaga
- Infraorder: Elateriformia
- Family: Buprestidae
- Genus: Agrilodia; Obenberger, 1923

Genus of beetles

Agrilodia is a genus of jewel beetles that belongs to the family Buprestidae.

== Taxonomy ==
=== Species ===
The genus currently contains five species. They are listed below:

- Agrilodia hirundo (Chevrolat, 1838)
- Agrilodia iris (Gory, 1841)
- Agrilodia leopardina Obenberger, 1943
- Agrilodia oporina Obenberger, 1924
- Agrilodia paraguayensis Obenberger, 1923
