= Parakamosia =

Scientific classification
- Kingdom: Animalia
- Phylum: Arthropoda
- Class: Insecta
- Order: Coleoptera
- Suborder: Polyphaga
- Infraorder: Elateriformia
- Family: Buprestidae
- Genus: Parakamosia; Obenberger, 1924

Genus of beetles

Parakamosia is a genus of beetles in the family Buprestidae, containing the following species:

- Parakamosia camerunica Thery, 1932
- Parakamosia carnithorax Obenberger, 1924
- Parakamosia margotana Novak, 1988
- Parakamosia muehlei Novak, 1988
- Parakamosia parva Bellamy, 1986
- Parakamosia zophera Bellamy, 1986
- Parakamosia zoufali Obenberger, 1924
