= Amorphosternoides =

Amorphosternoides vianai

Scientific classification
- Kingdom: Animalia
- Phylum: Arthropoda
- Class: Insecta
- Order: Coleoptera
- Suborder: Polyphaga
- Infraorder: Elateriformia
- Family: Buprestidae
- Genus: Amorphosternoides; Cobos, 1974
- Species: A. vianai

Binomial name
- Amorphosternoides vianai (Obenberger, 1947)

Genus of beetles

Amorphosternoides vianai is a species of beetles in the family Buprestidae, the only species in the genus Amorphosternoides.
