= Agriloides =

Scientific classification
- Kingdom: Animalia
- Phylum: Arthropoda
- Class: Insecta
- Order: Coleoptera
- Suborder: Polyphaga
- Infraorder: Elateriformia
- Family: Buprestidae
- Genus: Agriloides; Kerremans, 1903

Genus of beetles

Agriloides is a genus of beetles in the family Buprestidae, containing the following species:

- Agriloides aequatoris Obenberger, 1922
- Agriloides bipunctatus Cobos, 1967
- Agriloides difformis Cobos, 1959
- Agriloides erratus (Kerremans, 1900)
- Agriloides foersteri Cobos, 1967
- Agriloides gaucho Obenberger, 1932
- Agriloides gebhardti Obenberger, 1924
- Agriloides gibbifrons (Kerremans, 1899)
- Agriloides hydropicus (Klug, 1825)
- Agriloides jucundus (Kerremans, 1897)
- Agriloides longus Obenberger, 1924
- Agriloides meranus Obenberger, 1942
- Agriloides moorei Curletti, 2015
- Agriloides mrazi Obenberger, 1922
- Agriloides mucoreus Cobos, 1959
- Agriloides nickerli Obenberger, 1924
- Agriloides purpureocaudatus Cobos, 1967
- Agriloides silverioi Cobos, 1956
- Agriloides tuberculatus (Klug, 1825)
- Agriloides velutinus (Kerremans, 1900)
