= Helferina =

Helferina olivacea

Scientific classification
- Kingdom: Animalia
- Phylum: Arthropoda
- Class: Insecta
- Order: Coleoptera
- Suborder: Polyphaga
- Infraorder: Elateriformia
- Family: Buprestidae
- Genus: Helferina; Cobos, 1956
- Species: H. olivacea

Binomial name
- Helferina olivacea Cobos, 1956

Genus of beetles

Helferina olivacea is a species of beetle in the family Buprestidae, the only species in the genus Helferina.
