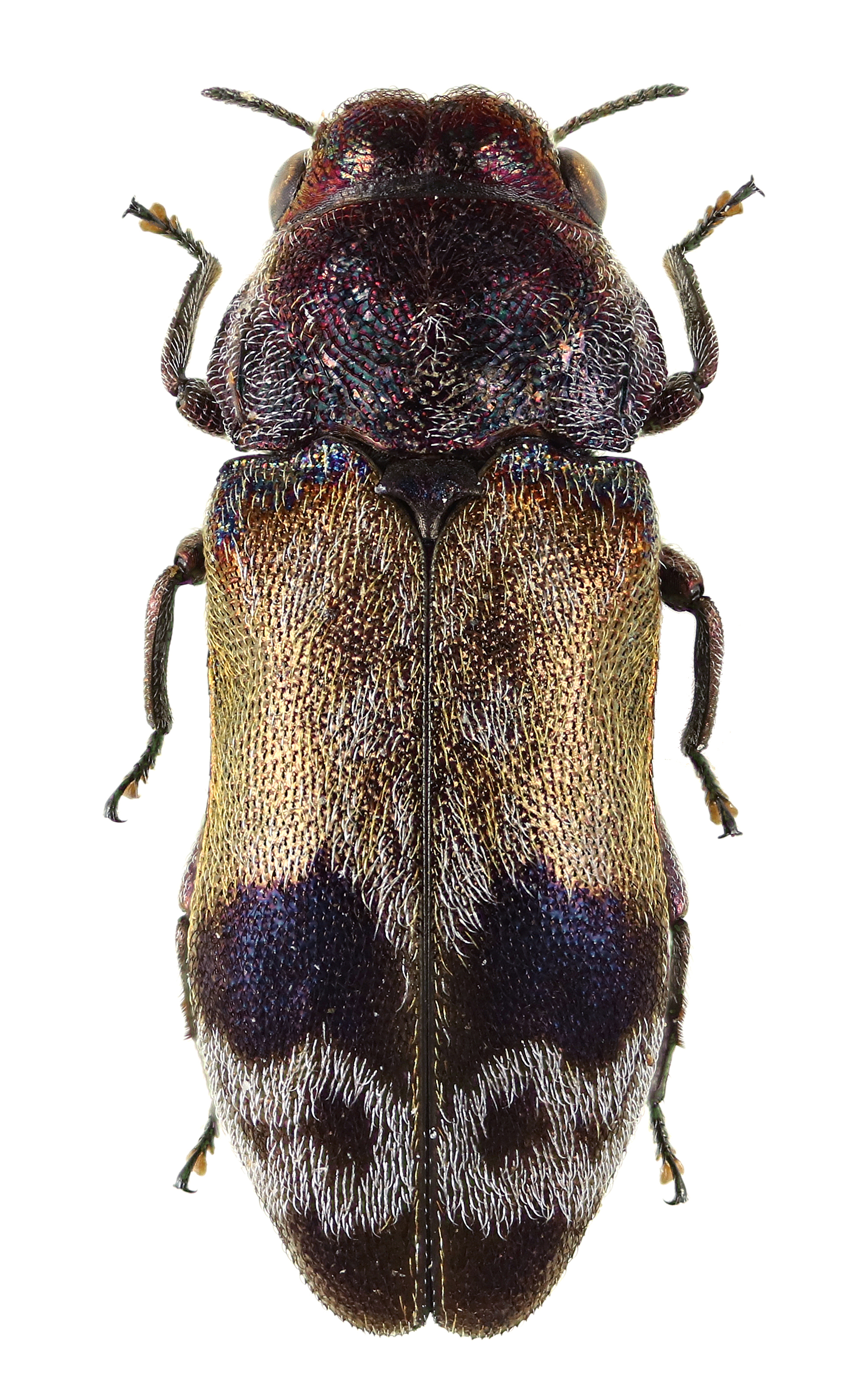
- A sambus quadricolor beetle

Scientific classification
- Kingdom: Animalia
- Phylum: Arthropoda
- Class: Insecta
- Order: Coleoptera
- Suborder: Polyphaga
- Infraorder: Elateriformia
- Family: Buprestidae
- Genus: Sambus; Deyrolle, 1864

= Sambus =

Genus of beetles

Sambus is a genus of beetles in the family Buprestidae, the jewel beetles. There are some 165 species distributed across Africa, parts of Asia, and Oceania, including Australia.

Species include:

- Sambus achilles Obenberger, 1940
- Sambus adonis Obenberger, 1924
- Sambus aeneas Obenberger, 1940
- Sambus aeneicollis Fisher, 1921
- Sambus aeneus Kerremans, 1900
- Sambus aethiopicus Obenberger, 1935
- Sambus africanus Kerremans, 1903
- Sambus aiax Obenberger, 1940
- Sambus albopunctatus (Fåhraeus in Boheman, 1851)
- Sambus alienus Obenberger, 1935
- Sambus amabilis Deyrolle, 1864
- Sambus angolensis Obenberger, 1935
- Sambus argentatus Gestro, 1877
- Sambus aruensis Théry, 1926
- Sambus atropurpureus Fisher, 1925
- Sambus auberti Théry, 1926
- Sambus auricolor Saunders, 1874
- Sambus australis Bellamy & Peterson, 2000
- Sambus bakeri Fisher, 1921
- Sambus bakerianus Obenberger, 1924
- Sambus barkeri Bellamy, 2007
- Sambus bedoti Théry, 1926
- Sambus binhensis Descarpentries & Villiers, 1966
- Sambus boettcheri Obenberger, 1932
- Sambus boisduvali (Montrouzier, 1855)
- Sambus butuanensis Obenberger, 1932
- Sambus caesar Obenberger, 1935
- Sambus camerunicus Obenberger, 1922
- Sambus castor Obenberger, 1940
- Sambus chalcosomus Thomson, 1879
- Sambus cochinchinae Obenberger, 1924
- Sambus coeruleipennis Théry, 1930
- Sambus coloratus Kerremans, 1892
- Sambus confusus Fisher, 1921
- Sambus congolanus Obenberger, 1924
- Sambus coxalis Obenberger, 1935
- Sambus curtus Théry, 1926
- Sambus cyaneomicans Obenberger, 1932
- Sambus daoensis Descarpentries & Villiers, 1966
- Sambus darlingtoni Théry, 1937
- Sambus davidi Théry, 1926
- Sambus dedicatus Thomson, 1879
- Sambus delectabilis Kerremans, 1900
- Sambus delicatulus Obenberger, 1924
- Sambus deyrollei Thomson, 1878
- Sambus dives Deyrolle, 1864
- Sambus divisus Deyrolle, 1864
- Sambus dohertyi Théry, 1926
- Sambus douquetteae Descarpentries, 1968
- Sambus drescheri Obenberger, 1932
- Sambus eremitus Obenberger, 1924
- Sambus fasciatus Fisher, 1921
- Sambus faustinus Obenberger, 1924
- Sambus femoralis Kerremans, 1892
- Sambus fidjiensis Obenberger, 1924
- Sambus formosanus Miwa & Chûjô, 1935
- Sambus fouqueti Bourgoin, 1923
- Sambus fulgidicollis Kerremans, 1900
- Sambus fulvopictus Kerremans, 1900
- Sambus gautierii Deyrolle, 1864
- Sambus gibbicollis Kerremans, 1892
- Sambus gibbosus Fisher, 1921
- Sambus gmelinae Théry, 1930
- Sambus gratiosulus Obenberger, 1932
- Sambus gratiosus Kerremans, 1900
- Sambus haddeni Obenberger, 1932
- Sambus hewitti Kerremans, 1912
- Sambus hirtulus Obenberger, 1935
- Sambus inermipes Bourgoin, 1923
- Sambus isis Jackman, 1987
- Sambus javicolus Fisher, 1935
- Sambus jelineki Descarpentries & Villiers, 1966
- Sambus kannegieteri Obenberger, 1924
- Sambus kanssuensis Ganglbauer, 1890
- Sambus labaili Baudon, 1968
- Sambus lafertei Deyrolle, 1864
- Sambus larminati Théry, 1926
- Sambus lituratus Deyrolle, 1864
- Sambus loriae Kerremans, 1892
- Sambus lugubris Saunders, 1874
- Sambus luzonicus Fisher, 1921
- Sambus luzonigena Obenberger, 1932
- Sambus macromerus Montrouzier, 1860
- Sambus madagascariensis Descarpentries, 1968
- Sambus manni Théry, 1937
- Sambus maquilingi Obenberger, 1924
- Sambus marmoreus Théry, 1926
- Sambus marshalli (Obenberger, 1923)
- Sambus massaicus Obenberger, 1940
- Sambus melanoderus Kerremans, 1892
- Sambus minutus Kerremans, 1896
- Sambus modestus Kerremans, 1892
- Sambus monardi Théry, 1947
- Sambus montanus Kerremans, 1908
- Sambus muong Descarpentries & Villiers, 1966
- Sambus nickerli Obenberger, 1924
- Sambus nigricans Fisher, 1921
- Sambus nigritus Kerremans, 1892
- Sambus novus Théry, 1926
- Sambus opacus Kerremans, 1900
- Sambus optatus Théry, 1926
- Sambus ornatus Fisher, 1921
- Sambus orothi Baudon, 1962
- Sambus pacificus Théry, 1926
- Sambus palawanus Théry, 1926
- Sambus papuanus (Obenberger, 1924)
- Sambus parallelus Fisher, 1921
- Sambus parisii Deyrolle, 1864
- Sambus patroclus Obenberger, 1940
- Sambus pauper Kerremans, 1900
- Sambus pertoldi Obenberger, 1922
- Sambus peyrierasi Descarpentries, 1968
- Sambus philippinarum Obenberger, 1924
- Sambus philippinus Fisher, 1922
- Sambus pictus Kerremans, 1900
- Sambus pollux Obenberger, 1940
- Sambus prainae Hauser, 1900
- Sambus pudicus Théry, 1926
- Sambus pygmaeus Kerremans, 1903
- Sambus quadricolor Saunders, 1873
- Sambus quinquefasciatus Miwa & Chûjô, 1935
- Sambus ribbei Théry, 1926
- Sambus rothkirchi Obenberger, 1923
- Sambus sandakanus Obenberger, 1924
- Sambus satanellus Obenberger, 1917
- Sambus seyrigi Descarpentries, 1968
- Sambus sibuyanicus Obenberger, 1932
- Sambus signatus Théry, 1926
- Sambus simmondsi Théry, 1938
- Sambus simplex Kerremans, 1900
- Sambus soricinus Deyrolle, 1864
- Sambus ssp. unifasciatus Kurosawa, 1985
- Sambus strandi Obenberger, 1924
- Sambus subgrisescens Deyrolle, 1864
- Sambus sulcicollis Théry, 1930
- Sambus telamon Obenberger, 1940
- Sambus thoracalis Obenberger, 1932
- Sambus timoris Obenberger, 1935
- Sambus tonkinensis Obenberger, 1924
- Sambus troilus Obenberger, 1940
- Sambus vadoni Descarpentries, 1968
- Sambus vanrooni Obenberger, 1923
- Sambus vermiculatus Deyrolle, 1864
- Sambus vientianensis Baudon, 1968
- Sambus villosus Kerremans, 1903
- Sambus viridiceps (Kerremans, 1900)
- Sambus vitalisi Descarpentries & Villiers, 1966
- Sambus weyersi Kerremans, 1900
- Sambus yaeyamanus Kurosawa, 1985
- Sambus zonalis Kerremans, 1893
