= Sakalianus =

Sakalianus marietae

Scientific classification
- Kingdom: Animalia
- Phylum: Arthropoda
- Class: Insecta
- Order: Coleoptera
- Suborder: Polyphaga
- Infraorder: Elateriformia
- Family: Buprestidae
- Genus: Sakalianus; Jendek, 2007
- Species: S. marietae

Binomial name
- Sakalianus marietae Jendek, 2007

Genus of beetles

Sakalianus is a monotypic genus of beetles in the family Buprestidae, the jewel beetles. The sole species, Sakalianus marietae, was first described to science in 2007. It is known only from Kenya.

This beetle is roughly 4 millimeters long. It has a narrow body with a large, convex head and large eyes. It is shiny purple-red in color with whitish spots and it has yellowish hairs along parts of its elytra. Male and female look similar. The beetle has been collected from acacia trees.
