= Callipyndax =

Scientific classification
- Kingdom: Animalia
- Phylum: Arthropoda
- Clade: Pancrustacea
- Class: Insecta
- Order: Coleoptera
- Suborder: Polyphaga
- Infraorder: Elateriformia
- Family: Buprestidae
- Genus: Callipyndax; Waterhouse, 1887

Genus of beetles

Callipyndax is a genus of beetles in the family Buprestidae, containing the following species:

- Callipyndax cupreiventris Waterhouse, 1887
- Callipyndax encontrario Bellamy, 1994
