= Nelsonagrilus =

Scientific classification
- Kingdom: Animalia
- Phylum: Arthropoda
- Class: Insecta
- Order: Coleoptera
- Suborder: Polyphaga
- Infraorder: Elateriformia
- Family: Buprestidae
- Genus: Nelsonagrilus; Jendek, 2006

Genus of beetles

Nelsonagrilus is a genus of beetles in the family Buprestidae, the jewel beetles. The genus was erected in 2006 with the description of three new species. N. typicus and N. bambula occur in Laos and N. suzannae is native to Sumatra.

These beetles have small bodies with relatively large, convex heads and eyes and short antennae. Of the specimens collected so far, N. suzannae is the largest, reaching about 4.5 millimeters long. It is black with a green iridescence and a coat of white hairs. N. bambula is black with a "silky tinge" and N. typicus is coppery in color with a reddish sheen.

Species:

- Nelsonagrilus bambula Jendek, 2006
- Nelsonagrilus suzannae Jendek, 2006
- Nelsonagrilus typicus Jendek, 2006
