= Sjoestedtius =

Scientific classification
- Kingdom: Animalia
- Phylum: Arthropoda
- Class: Insecta
- Order: Coleoptera
- Suborder: Polyphaga
- Infraorder: Elateriformia
- Family: Buprestidae
- Genus: Sjoestedtius; Thery, 1931

Genus of beetles

Sjoestedtius is a genus of beetles in the family Buprestidae, containing the following species:

- Sjoestedtius affinis (Obenberger, 1922)
- Sjoestedtius arrowi (Obenberger, 1922)
- Sjoestedtius buarinus (Obenberger, 1922)
- Sjoestedtius daressalamensis Obenberger, 1935
- Sjoestedtius egregius (Boheman, 1860)
- Sjoestedtius impressicollis (Kerremans, 1914)
- Sjoestedtius laticeps (Kerremans, 1914)
- Sjoestedtius madegassus Obenberger, 1939
- Sjoestedtius meinradi (Kerremans, 1907)
- Sjoestedtius monardi (Thery, 1947)
- Sjoestedtius nodiceps (Kerremans, 1900)
- Sjoestedtius nyassae Obenberger, 1935
- Sjoestedtius occisus (Kerremans, 1903)
- Sjoestedtius rhodesicus (Obenberger, 1922)
- Sjoestedtius semotus (Peringuey, 1908)
- Sjoestedtius stevensoni Obenberger, 1935
- Sjoestedtius thoracicus (Kerremans, 1903)
- Sjoestedtius tuberculifrons (Peringuey, 1908)
