= Pseudagrilodes =

Pseudagrilodes leonensis

Scientific classification
- Kingdom: Animalia
- Phylum: Arthropoda
- Class: Insecta
- Order: Coleoptera
- Suborder: Polyphaga
- Infraorder: Elateriformia
- Family: Buprestidae
- Genus: Pseudagrilodes; Obenberger, 1921
- Species: P. leonensis

Binomial name
- Pseudagrilodes leonensis (Kerremans, 1898)

Genus of beetles

Pseudagrilodes leonensis is a species of beetles in the family Buprestidae, the only species in the genus Pseudagrilodes.
