= Pilotrulleum =

Scientific classification
- Kingdom: Animalia
- Phylum: Arthropoda
- Class: Insecta
- Order: Coleoptera
- Suborder: Polyphaga
- Infraorder: Elateriformia
- Family: Buprestidae
- Genus: Pilotrulleum; Bellamy & Westcott, 1995

Genus of beetles

Pilotrulleum is a genus of beetles in the family Buprestidae, the jewel beetles. There are two species, both native to Mexico. P. caesariae can also be found in Costa Rica.

Species include:

- Pilotrulleum caesariae Bellamy & Westcott, 1995
- Pilotrulleum lagartiguanum Bellamy & Westcott, 1995
