= Deyrollius =

Scientific classification
- Kingdom: Animalia
- Phylum: Arthropoda
- Class: Insecta
- Order: Coleoptera
- Suborder: Polyphaga
- Infraorder: Elateriformia
- Family: Buprestidae
- Genus: Deyrollius; Obenberger, 1922

Genus of beetles

Deyrollius is a genus of beetles in the family Buprestidae, containing the following species:

- Deyrollius alvarengai Cobos, 1972
- Deyrollius angustithorax Cobos, 1979
- Deyrollius anthaxoides Cobos, 1972
- Deyrollius bahianus Cobos, 1979
- Deyrollius canescens Cobos, 1972
- Deyrollius cupreoviridis (Thomson, 1879)
- Deyrollius descarpentriesi Cobos, 1979
- Deyrollius hercules Cobos, 1972
- Deyrollius mnizechi Thery, 1934
- Deyrollius nicki Cobos, 1957
- Deyrollius niger (Kerremans, 1903)
- Deyrollius nitidicollis (Gory & Laporte, 1839)
- Deyrollius paraguayensis Obenberger, 1932
- Deyrollius pujoli Cobos, 1979
- Deyrollius striatus (Gory & Laporte, 1839)
- Deyrollius vianai Cobos, 1972
