= Amorphosternus =

Amorphosternus cucullatus

Scientific classification
- Kingdom: Animalia
- Phylum: Arthropoda
- Class: Insecta
- Order: Coleoptera
- Suborder: Polyphaga
- Infraorder: Elateriformia
- Family: Buprestidae
- Genus: Amorphosternus; Deyrolle, 1864
- Species: A. cucullatus

Binomial name
- Amorphosternus cucullatus (Gory, 1841)

Genus of beetles

Amorphosternus cucullatus is a species of beetles in the family Buprestidae, the only species in the genus Amorphosternus.
