= Bergidora =

Scientific classification
- Kingdom: Animalia
- Phylum: Arthropoda
- Class: Insecta
- Order: Coleoptera
- Suborder: Polyphaga
- Infraorder: Elateriformia
- Family: Buprestidae
- Genus: Bergidora; Kerremans, 1903

Genus of beetles

Bergidora is a genus of beetles in the family Buprestidae, containing the following species:

- Bergidora bruchi (Obenberger, 1932)
- Bergidora picturella (Kerremans, 1887)
