= Mychommatus =

Scientific classification
- Kingdom: Animalia
- Phylum: Arthropoda
- Class: Insecta
- Order: Coleoptera
- Suborder: Polyphaga
- Infraorder: Elateriformia
- Family: Buprestidae
- Genus: Mychommatus; Murray, 1868

Genus of beetles

Mychommatus is a genus of beetles in the family Buprestidae, containing the following species:

- Mychommatus delaunayi Thery, 1947
- Mychommatus marinus Curletti, 2002
- Mychommatus violaceus (Fabricius, 1787)
