= Bellamyus =

Scientific classification
- Kingdom: Animalia
- Phylum: Arthropoda
- Class: Insecta
- Order: Coleoptera
- Suborder: Polyphaga
- Infraorder: Elateriformia
- Family: Buprestidae
- Genus: Bellamyus; Curletetti, 1997

Genus of beetles

Bellamyus is a genus of beetles in the family Buprestidae, containing the following species:

- Bellamyus acutiformis Curletetti, 2002
- Bellamyus fulgidus Curletetti, 1997
- Bellamyus maddalenae Curletetti, 2002
- Bellamyus opacus Curletetti & Bellamy, 2005
