= Velutia =

Scientific classification
- Kingdom: Animalia
- Phylum: Arthropoda
- Class: Insecta
- Order: Coleoptera
- Suborder: Polyphaga
- Infraorder: Elateriformia
- Family: Buprestidae
- Genus: Velutia; Kerremans, 1900

Genus of beetles

Velutia is a genus of beetles in the family Buprestidae, containing the following species:

- Velutia amplicollis Cobos, 1976
- Velutia elegantula Cobos, 1976
- Velutia sericea Kerremans, 1900
- Velutia zischkai (Cobos, 1961)
