= Autarcontes =

Scientific classification
- Kingdom: Animalia
- Phylum: Arthropoda
- Clade: Pancrustacea
- Class: Insecta
- Order: Coleoptera
- Suborder: Polyphaga
- Infraorder: Elateriformia
- Family: Buprestidae
- Genus: Autarcontes; Waterhouse, 1887

Genus of beetles

Autarcontes is a genus of beetles in the family Buprestidae, containing the following species:

- Autarcontes abdominalis Waterhouse, 1887
- Autarcontes brasiliensis Obenberger, 1922
- Autarcontes cortezi Obenberger, 1958
- Autarcontes eucalopterus Obenberger, 1958
- Autarcontes guatemozin Obenberger, 1958
- Autarcontes lopezi Fisher, 1925
- Autarcontes montezuma Obenberger, 1958
- Autarcontes mucoreipennis Obenberger, 1958
- Autarcontes mucoreus (Klug, 1825)
- Autarcontes negrei Cobos, 1961
- Autarcontes pictiventris Waterhouse, 1887
- Autarcontes panus Waterhouse, 1887
