= Maublancia (beetle) =

Scientific classification
- Kingdom: Animalia
- Phylum: Arthropoda
- Class: Insecta
- Order: Coleoptera
- Suborder: Polyphaga
- Infraorder: Elateriformia
- Family: Buprestidae
- Subfamily: Agrilinae
- Tribe: Agrilini
- Genus: Maublancia; Bellamy, 1998

Genus of beetles

Maublancia is a genus of beetles in the family Buprestidae, containing the following species:

- Maublancia auberti Thery, 1947
- Maublancia testui Thery, 1947
