= Omochyseus =

Scientific classification
- Kingdom: Animalia
- Phylum: Arthropoda
- Clade: Pancrustacea
- Class: Insecta
- Order: Coleoptera
- Suborder: Polyphaga
- Infraorder: Elateriformia
- Family: Buprestidae
- Genus: Omochyseus; Waterhouse, 1887

Genus of beetles

Omochyseus is a genus of beetles in the family Buprestidae, containing the following species:

- Omochyseus omocyrius (Thomson, 1879)
- Omochyseus terminalis Waterhouse, 1887
