= Malawiella =

Scientific classification
- Kingdom: Animalia
- Phylum: Arthropoda
- Class: Insecta
- Order: Coleoptera
- Suborder: Polyphaga
- Infraorder: Elateriformia
- Family: Buprestidae
- Genus: Malawiella; Bellamy, 1990

Genus of beetles

Malawiella is a genus of beetles in the family Buprestidae, containing the following species:

- Malawiella bouyeri Curletti, 2004
- Malawiella divina (Obenberger, 1935)
- Malawiella obscuriviridis Bellamy, 1990
