= Dorochoviella =

Dorochoviella kunashirensis

Scientific classification
- Kingdom: Animalia
- Phylum: Arthropoda
- Class: Insecta
- Order: Coleoptera
- Suborder: Polyphaga
- Infraorder: Elateriformia
- Family: Buprestidae
- Genus: Dorochoviella; Jendek, 2006
- Species: D. kunashirensis

Binomial name
- Dorochoviella kunashirensis Jendek, 2006

Genus of beetles

Dorochoviella is a monotypic genus of beetles in the family Buprestidae, the jewel beetles. It was erected in 2006 with the description of the new species Dorochoviella kunashirensis. The single known specimen was collected on Kunashir Island, one of the Kuril Islands.

The type specimen is female; the male of the species is not yet known. The beetle is elongated and narrow, measuring about 6.8 millimeters long. The elytra are a gold-tinged green in color, the head is golden orange, and the underside is silky black.
