= Eumerophilus =

Eumerophilus coraeboides

Scientific classification
- Kingdom: Animalia
- Phylum: Arthropoda
- Class: Insecta
- Order: Coleoptera
- Suborder: Polyphaga
- Infraorder: Elateriformia
- Family: Buprestidae
- Genus: Eumerophilus; Deyrolle, 1864
- Species: E. coraeboides

Binomial name
- Eumerophilus coraeboides (Thomson, 1878)

Genus of beetles

Eumerophilus coraeboides is a species of beetles in the family Buprestidae, the only species in the genus Eumerophilus.
