= Pseudagrilus =

Scientific classification
- Kingdom: Animalia
- Phylum: Arthropoda
- Class: Insecta
- Order: Coleoptera
- Suborder: Polyphaga
- Infraorder: Elateriformia
- Family: Buprestidae
- Genus: Pseudagrilus; Laporte, 1835

Genus of beetles

Pseudagrilus is a genus of beetles in the family Buprestidae, containing the following species:

- Pseudagrilus alutaceus Obenberger, 1924
- Pseudagrilus arabicus Obenberger, 1925
- Pseudagrilus beryllinus (Fahraeus, 1851)
- Pseudagrilus curtus Thery, 1930
- Pseudagrilus cyanimus (Fahraeus, 1851)
- Pseudagrilus dubius Obenberger, 1924
- Pseudagrilus gedyei Thery, 1930
- Pseudagrilus hunti Thery, 1941
- Pseudagrilus inamaenus Thery, 1930
- Pseudagrilus inornatus Harold, 1878
- Pseudagrilus keniae Obenberger, 1924
- Pseudagrilus lathami Thery, 1930
- Pseudagrilus leonensis Kerremans, 1898
- Pseudagrilus melliculus (Gory, 1841)
- Pseudagrilus paradiseus Obenberger, 1924
- Pseudagrilus parallelus Kerremans, 1913
- Pseudagrilus pauliani Descarpentries, 1946
- Pseudagrilus peringueyi Bellamy, 1990
- Pseudagrilus scintillans (Fairmaire, 1903)
- Pseudagrilus seydeli Thery, 1940
- Pseudagrilus sjoestedti Kerremans, 1908
- Pseudagrilus sophorae (Fabricius, 1793)
- Pseudagrilus splendidus Laporte, 1835
- Pseudagrilus subfasciatus Kerremans, 1898
- Pseudagrilus variabilis Thery, 1930
- Pseudagrilus wittei Thery, 1948
- Pseudagrilus zonatus Roth, 1851
