= Rhaeboscelis =

Scientific classification
- Kingdom: Animalia
- Phylum: Arthropoda
- Class: Insecta
- Order: Coleoptera
- Suborder: Polyphaga
- Infraorder: Elateriformia
- Family: Buprestidae
- Genus: Rhaeboscelis; Chevrolat, 1838

Genus of beetles

Rhaeboscelis is a genus of beetles in the family Buprestidae, containing the following species:

- Rhaeboscelis chalybea (Gory, 1841)
- Rhaeboscelis purpurea Chevrolat, 1838
