= Nickerleola =

Scientific classification
- Kingdom: Animalia
- Phylum: Arthropoda
- Class: Insecta
- Order: Coleoptera
- Suborder: Polyphaga
- Infraorder: Elateriformia
- Family: Buprestidae
- Genus: Nickerleola; Obenberger, 1923

Genus of beetles

Nickerleola is a genus of beetles in the family Buprestidae, containing the following species:

- Nickerleola camerunica (Obenberger, 1928)
- Nickerleola isabellae (Obenberger, 1921)
- Nickerleola maculigera Obenberger, 1923
- Nickerleola mashuna Obenberger, 1931
- Nickerleola raffrayi (Thery, 1930)
- Nickerleola wittei (Thery, 1948)
