= Parasambus =

Scientific classification
- Kingdom: Animalia
- Phylum: Arthropoda
- Class: Insecta
- Order: Coleoptera
- Suborder: Polyphaga
- Infraorder: Elateriformia
- Family: Buprestidae
- Genus: Parasambus; Descarpentries & Villiers, 1966

Genus of beetles

Parasambus is a genus of beetles in the family Buprestidae, containing the following species:

- Parasambus aurosignatus Descarpentries & Villiers, 1966
- Parasambus sauteri (Kerremans, 1913)
