= Amyia =

Scientific classification
- Kingdom: Animalia
- Phylum: Arthropoda
- Class: Insecta
- Order: Coleoptera
- Suborder: Polyphaga
- Infraorder: Elateriformia
- Family: Buprestidae
- Genus: Amyia; Saunders, 1871

Genus of beetles

Amyia is a genus of beetles in the family Buprestidae, containing the following species:

- Amyia punctipennis Waterhouse, 1887
- Amyia violacea (Gory & Laporte, 1839)
