= Euamyia =

Euamyia chryselytria

Scientific classification
- Kingdom: Animalia
- Phylum: Arthropoda
- Class: Insecta
- Order: Coleoptera
- Suborder: Polyphaga
- Infraorder: Elateriformia
- Family: Buprestidae
- Genus: Euamyia; Kerremans, 1903
- Species: E. chryselytria

Binomial name
- Euamyia chryselytria (Perty, 1830)

Genus of beetles

Euamyia chryselytria is a species of beetle in the family Buprestidae, the only species in the genus Euamyia.
