= Ronisia =

Ronisia may refer to:

- Ronisia (singer), a singer from Cabo Verde, active in France
- Ronisia (wasp), a genus of hymenopteran insects, called velvet ants
