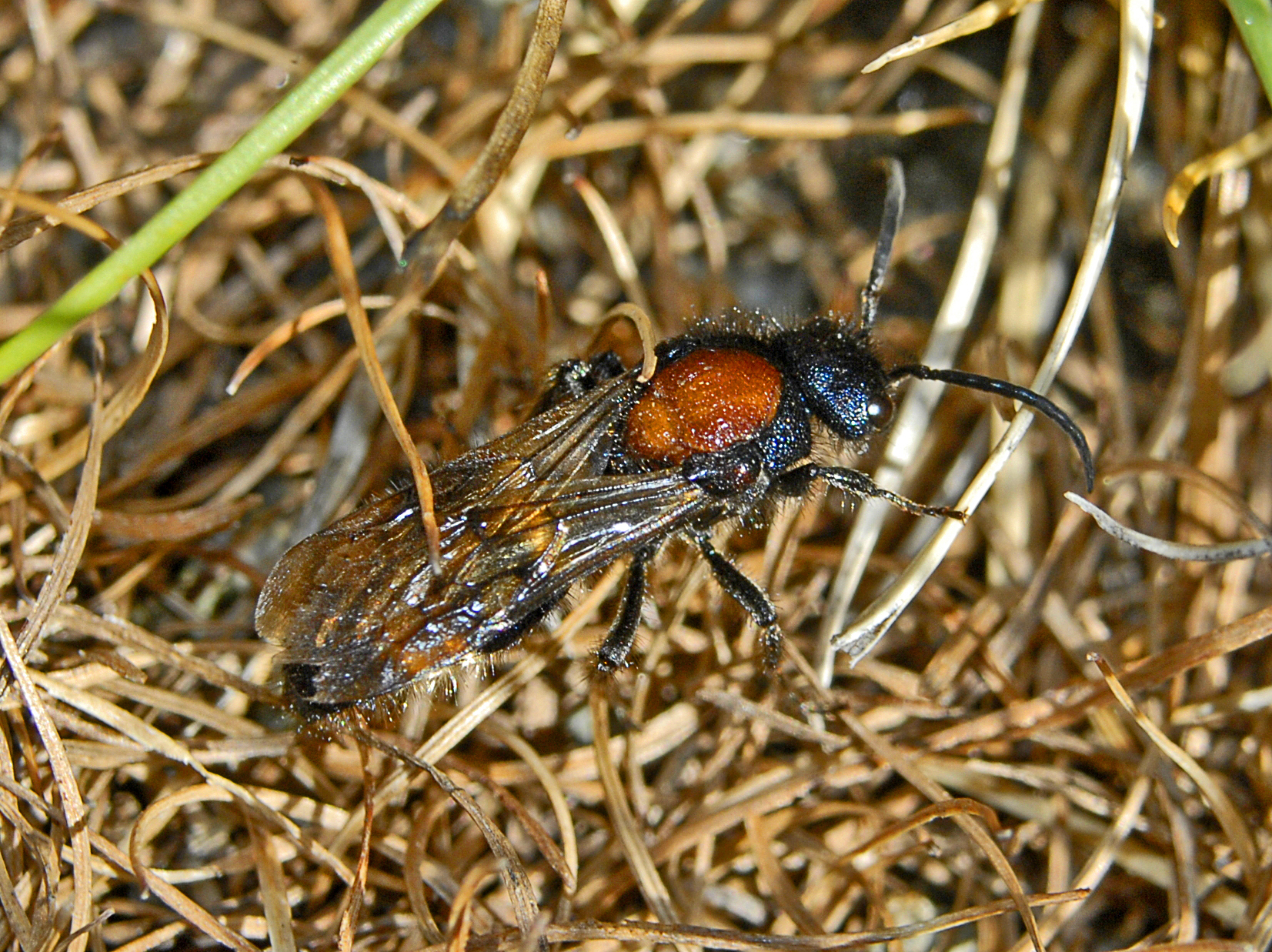
- Male of Mutilla europaea

Scientific classification
- Kingdom: Animalia
- Phylum: Arthropoda
- Class: Insecta
- Order: Hymenoptera
- Family: Mutillidae
- Genus: Mutilla; Linnaeus, 1758

Type species
- Mutilla europaea Linnaeus, 1758

= Mutilla =

Genus of wasps

Mutilla is a genus of parasitoid wasp belonging to the family Mutillidae.

== Species ==
- Mutilla europaea Linnaeus, 1758
- Mutilla marginata Baer, 1848
- Mutilla quinquemaculata Cyrillo, 1787
