= Aphanisticus cochinchinae =

Scientific classification
- Domain: Eukaryota
- Kingdom: Animalia
- Phylum: Arthropoda
- Class: Insecta
- Order: Coleoptera
- Suborder: Polyphaga
- Infraorder: Elateriformia
- Family: Buprestidae
- Genus: Aphanisticus
- Species: A. cochinchinae

Binomial name
- Aphanisticus cochinchinae Obenberger, 1924

Species of beetle

Aphanisticus cochinchinae is a species of metallic wood-boring beetle in the family Buprestidae. It is found in Southern Asia.

== Subspecies ==
These two subspecies belong to the species Aphanisticus cochinchinae:

- Aphanisticus cochinchinae cochinchinae Obenberger, 1924
- Aphanisticus cochinchinae seminulum Obenberger, 1929
