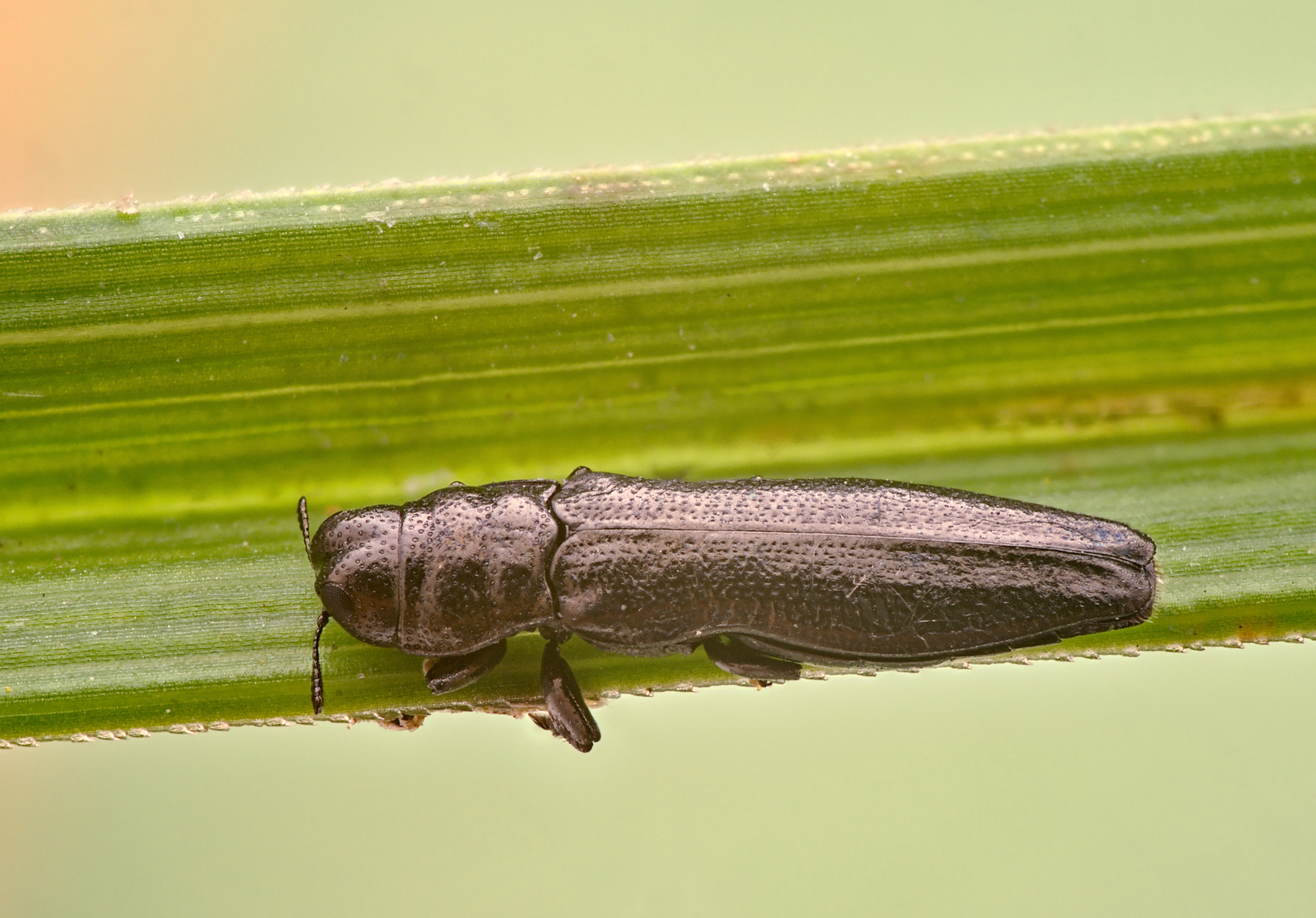
- Aphanisticus elongatus from Belgium.
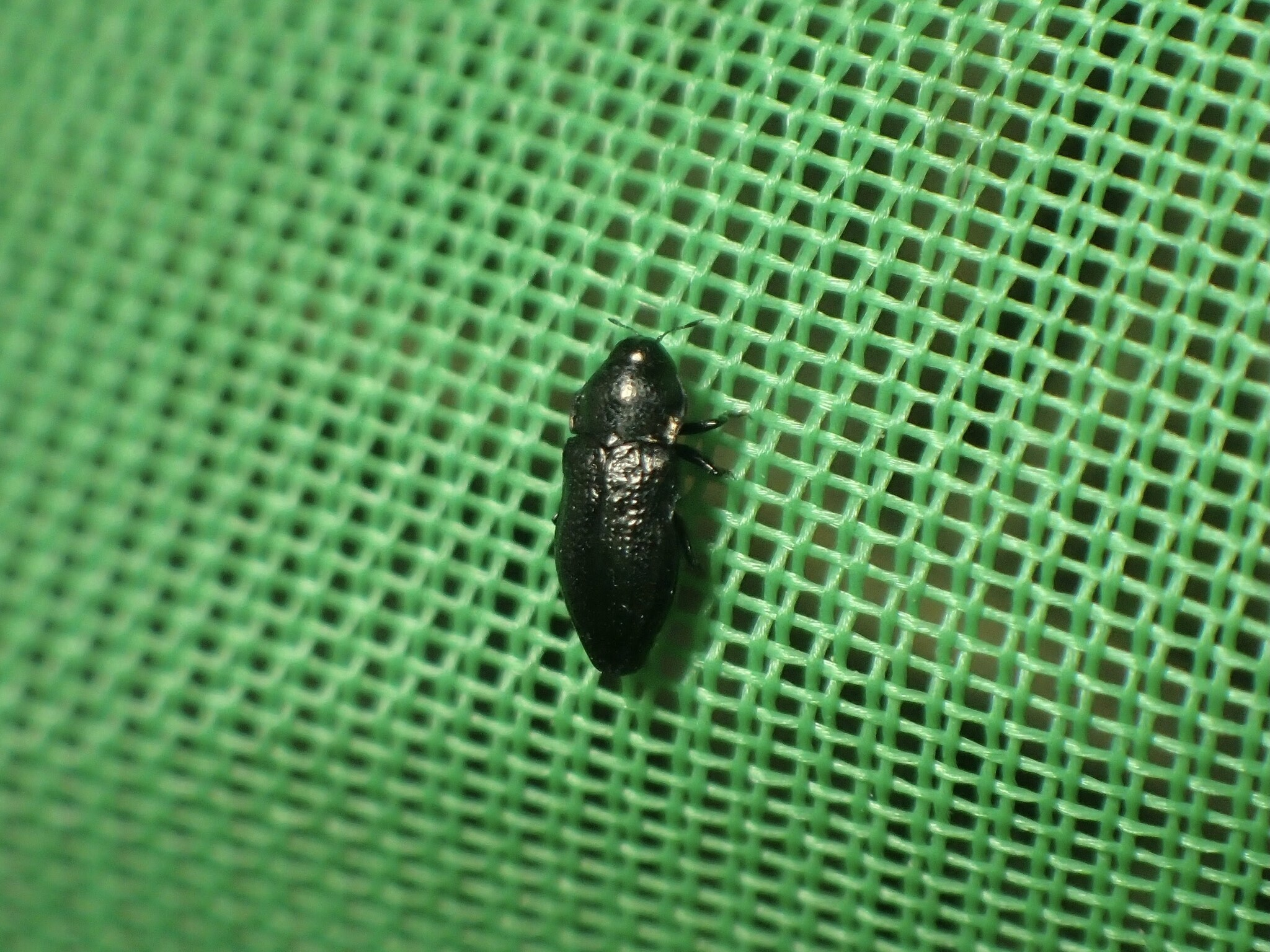
- Aphanisticus congener from Japan.

Scientific classification
- Kingdom: Animalia
- Phylum: Arthropoda
- Clade: Pancrustacea
- Class: Insecta
- Order: Coleoptera
- Suborder: Polyphaga
- Infraorder: Elateriformia
- Family: Buprestidae
- Tribe: Aphanisticini
- Genus: Aphanisticus; Latreille, 1829

Diversity
- at least 360 species

Synonyms
- Goniophthalma Chevrolat, 1837

= Aphanisticus =

Genus of jewel beetles

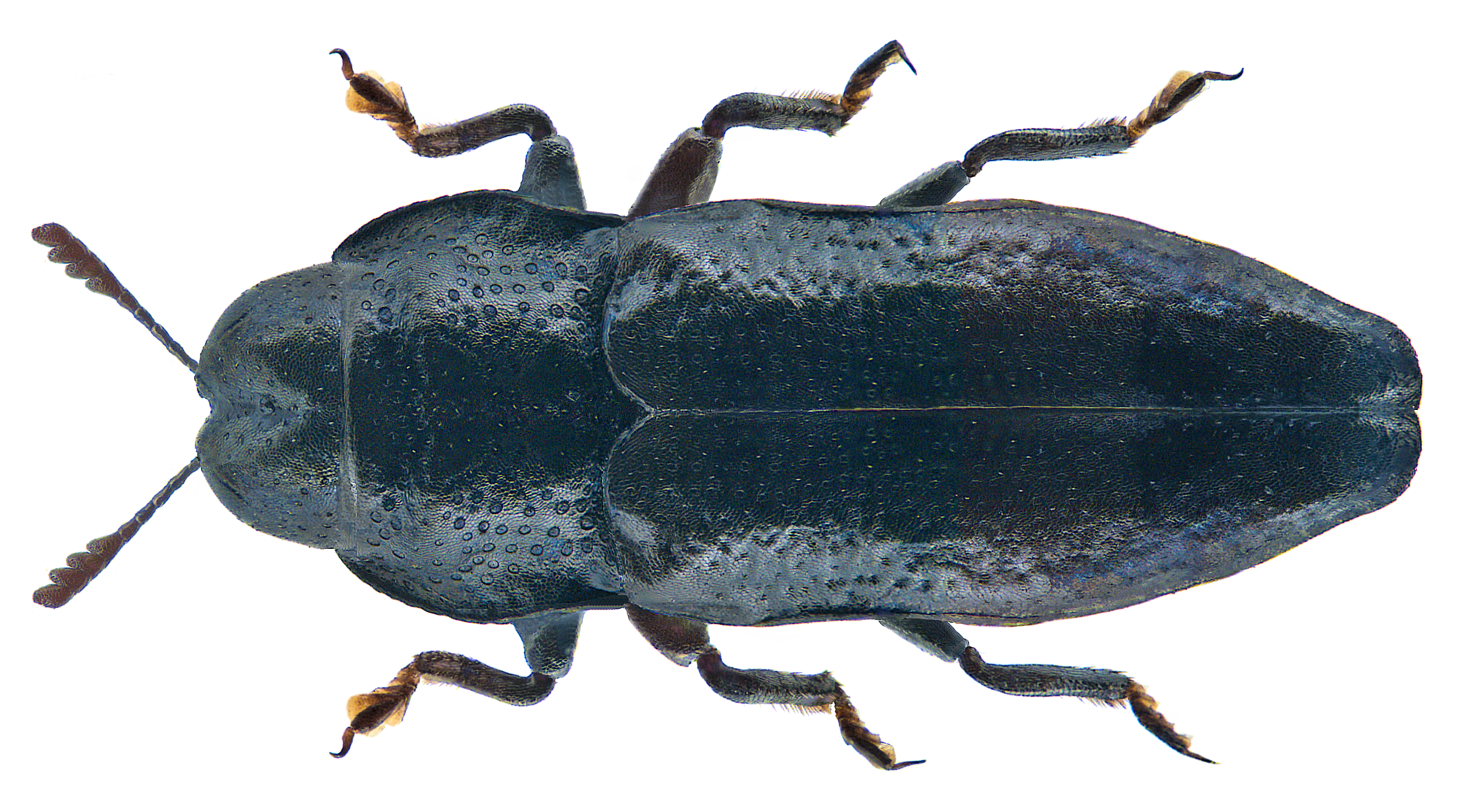
Aphanisticus pusillus

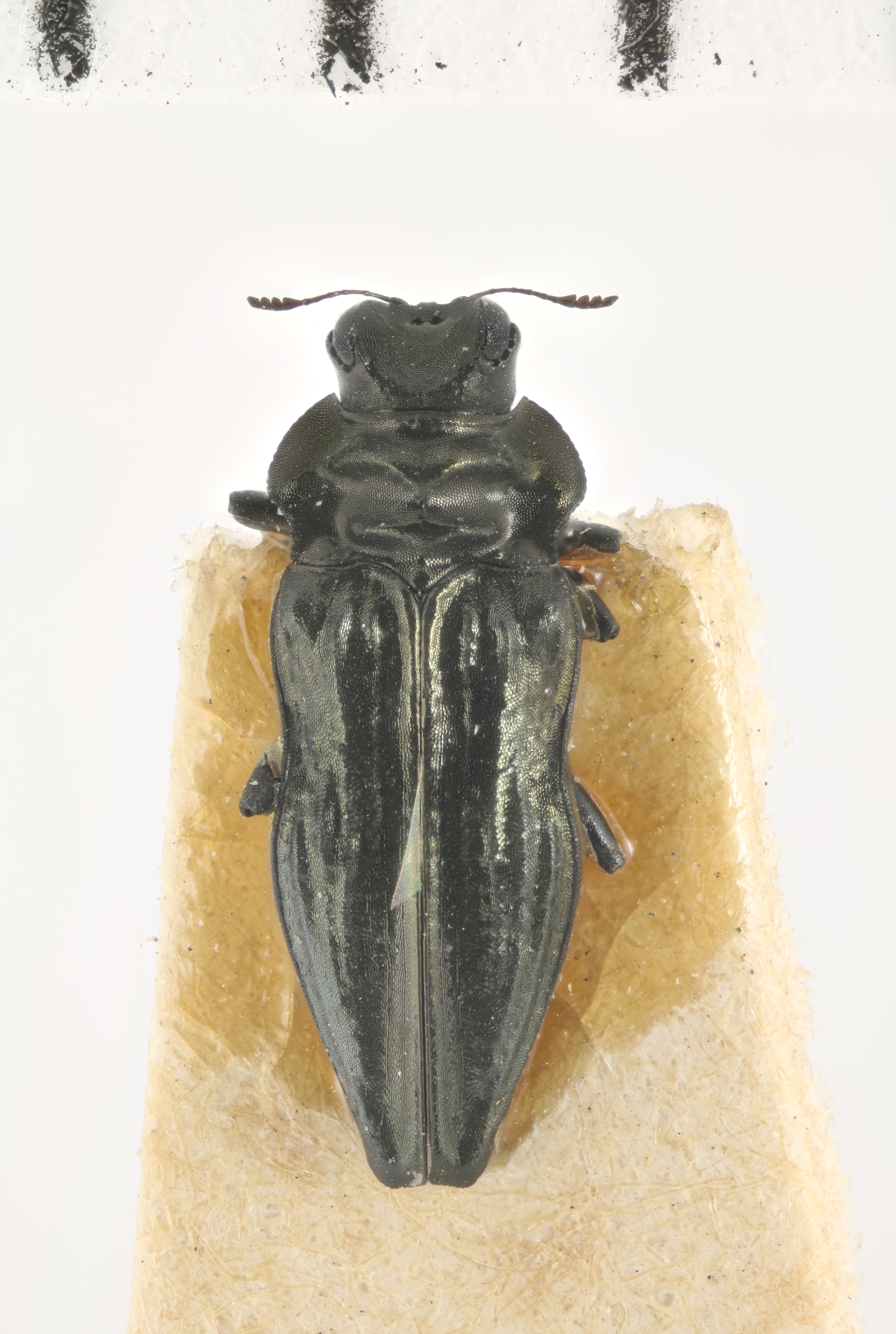
Aphanisticus cupricornis

Aphanisticus is a genus of jewel beetles that belongs to the tribe Aphanisticini. Species belonging to this genus are found on every continent except Antarctica in warm-temperate to tropical climates.

== Taxonomy ==
=== Species ===
Aphanisticus is a very diverse genus with more than 360 species that have been described belonging to this genus. Species belonging to the genus Aphanisticus are listed below:

- Aphanisticus aculeatus Théry, 1930
- Aphanisticus aegyptiacus Théry, 1930
- Aphanisticus aeneicollis Kerremans, 1896
- Aphanisticus aeneolus Kerremans, 1896
- Aphanisticus aeneomaculatus Fisher, 1937
- Aphanisticus aequinoxialis Thomson, 1879
- Aphanisticus aereus Théry, 1930
- Aphanisticus affinis Kerremans, 1900
- Aphanisticus afflatus Théry, 1948
- Aphanisticus aloisii Obenberger, 1937
- Aphanisticus amblyderus Fairmaire, 1876
- Aphanisticus ambodiranus Obenberger, 1937
- Aphanisticus ammon Théry, 1930
- Aphanisticus angolensis Théry, 1947
- Aphanisticus angustatus Lucas, 1846
- Aphanisticus angustifrons Théry, 1912
- Aphanisticus anniae Obenberger, 1932
- Aphanisticus antennatus Saunders, 1873
- Aphanisticus apayaoi Obenberger, 1928
- Aphanisticus apicalis Obenberger, 1928
- Aphanisticus arcuaticollis Motschulsky, 1861
- Aphanisticus assinicus Kerremans, 1903
- Aphanisticus ater Gory & Laporte, 1840
- Aphanisticus auberti Théry, 1930
- Aphanisticus aureocupreus (Kerremans, 1892)
- Aphanisticus auriculatus Gory & Laporte, 1840
- Aphanisticus autumnalis Obenberger, 1928
- Aphanisticus bakeri Fisher, 1921
- Aphanisticus baldasseronii Obenberger, 1939
- Aphanisticus bananaensis Obenberger, 1928
- Aphanisticus batoensis Obenberger, 1928
- Aphanisticus baumi Obenberger, 1928
- Aphanisticus bedeli Abeille de Perrin, 1893
- Aphanisticus belial Obenberger, 1928
- Aphanisticus bevinsi Théry, 1930
- Aphanisticus biafranus Obenberger, 1921
- Aphanisticus bicolor Kerremans, 1896
- Aphanisticus bilobiceps Kerremans, 1903
- Aphanisticus bilyi Kalashian, 1996
- Aphanisticus binhensis Descarpentries & Villiers, 1963
- Aphanisticus bison Théry, 1930
- Aphanisticus bispinosus Théry, 1930
- Aphanisticus bispinus Motschulsky, 1861
- Aphanisticus blackburni Carter, 1924
- Aphanisticus blaisei Descarpentries & Villiers, 1963
- Aphanisticus bogosicus Théry, 1930
- Aphanisticus bohaci Obenberger, 1924
- Aphanisticus bolmi Kalashian, 2004
- Aphanisticus borkuanus Descarpentries & Bruneau de Miré, 1963
- Aphanisticus bottegoi Kerremans, 1898
- Aphanisticus bourgoini Obenberger, 1928
- Aphanisticus bouvieri Théry, 1905
- Aphanisticus brevior Obenberger, 1928
- Aphanisticus browni Carter, 1924
- Aphanisticus bulbatus Bílý, 1973
- Aphanisticus caesareus Obenberger, 1928
- Aphanisticus calcuttensis Obenberger, 1928
- Aphanisticus camerunicus Théry, 1930
- Aphanisticus capensis Obenberger, 1928
- Aphanisticus capicola Théry, 1930
- Aphanisticus capricornis Obenberger, 1940
- Aphanisticus carbonarius Théry, 1930
- Aphanisticus celer Obenberger, 1928
- Aphanisticus cerdo Obenberger, 1928
- Aphanisticus cervicornis Obenberger, 1940
- Aphanisticus chloris Obenberger, 1928
- Aphanisticus clamator Théry, 1930
- Aphanisticus clavicornis Obenberger, 1918
- Aphanisticus cochinchinae Obenberger, 1924
- Aphanisticus coeruleiclytris Obenberger, 1937
- Aphanisticus coeruleipennis Théry, 1930
- Aphanisticus coerulescens Théry, 1930
- Aphanisticus collinus Obenberger, 1928
- Aphanisticus compactilis Obenberger, 1937
- Aphanisticus confusus Deyrolle, 1864
- Aphanisticus congener Saunders, 1875
- Aphanisticus connicki Baudon, 1968
- Aphanisticus conradsi Obenberger, 1937
- Aphanisticus consanguineus Ritsema, 1897
- Aphanisticus convexicollis Obenberger, 1928
- Aphanisticus coomani Descarpentries & Villiers, 1963
- Aphanisticus cordicollis Deyrolle, 1864
- Aphanisticus corniceps Obenberger, 1924
- Aphanisticus cornifer Théry, 1930
- Aphanisticus coronatus Théry, 1930
- Aphanisticus costatus Théry, 1930
- Aphanisticus costipennis Fisher, 1921
- Aphanisticus crassulus Obenberger, 1937
- Aphanisticus cristatus Kerremans, 1894
- Aphanisticus cupreomicans Obenberger, 1937
- Aphanisticus cupricornis Kerremans, 1892
- Aphanisticus curvicollis Kerremans, 1914
- Aphanisticus cylindricus Théry, 1930
- Aphanisticus damalonensis Obenberger, 1928
- Aphanisticus daoensis Kalashian, 2004
- Aphanisticus dapitani Obenberger, 1924
- Aphanisticus davidi Obenberger, 1937
- Aphanisticus decaryi Théry, 1930
- Aphanisticus decorsei Théry, 1930
- Aphanisticus delicatulus Fåhraeus in Boheman, 1851
- Aphanisticus dembickyi Kalashian, 1999
- Aphanisticus denticauda Kalashian, 1993
- Aphanisticus denticulatus Théry, 1912
- Aphanisticus descarpentriesi Kalashian, 1993
- Aphanisticus dessumi Descarpentries & Villiers, 1963
- Aphanisticus diabolicus Deyrolle, 1864
- Aphanisticus dicax Théry, 1930
- Aphanisticus dichrous Obenberger, 1928
- Aphanisticus difficilis Théry, 1930
- Aphanisticus dimorphus Théry, 1941
- Aphanisticus distinctus Perris, 1864
- Aphanisticus diversulus Obenberger, 1937
- Aphanisticus drescheri Fisher, 1937
- Aphanisticus dualaicus Obenberger, 1937
- Aphanisticus dubius Théry, 1930
- Aphanisticus edax Théry, 1930
- Aphanisticus elegans Théry, 1905
- Aphanisticus elongatus (Villa & Villa, 1835)
- Aphanisticus elphus Obenberger, 1940
- Aphanisticus emarginatus (Olivier, 1790)
- Aphanisticus endeloides Carter, 1924
- Aphanisticus eryx Théry, 1930
- Aphanisticus excavatus Fisher, 1921
- Aphanisticus filiformis Kerremans, 1896
- Aphanisticus flenci Kalashian & Kubáň, 2026
- Aphanisticus fluviatilis Kerremans, 1896
- Aphanisticus fossidiscus Obenberger, 1944
- Aphanisticus fossulipennis Obenberger, 1928
- Aphanisticus foveicollis Fisher, 1921
- Aphanisticus franki Kalashian & Kubáň, 2026
- Aphanisticus funebris Théry, 1930
- Aphanisticus galeatus Théry, 1930
- Aphanisticus gayaneae Kalashian, 2004
- Aphanisticus gebhardti Obenberger, 1924
- Aphanisticus gedyei Théry, 1941
- Aphanisticus genesti Théry, 1930
- Aphanisticus gerstaeckeri Obenberger, 1928
- Aphanisticus gestroanus Obenberger, 1932
- Aphanisticus gestroi Kerremans, 1894
- Aphanisticus goudotii Gory & Laporte, 1840
- Aphanisticus grandidieri Théry, 1912
- Aphanisticus grandis Théry, 1930
- Aphanisticus gratiosus Théry, 1948
- Aphanisticus grossei Obenberger, 1937
- Aphanisticus guyoni Théry, 1930
- Aphanisticus hajeki Kalashian, 2019
- Aphanisticus harauensis Kalashian, 2005
- Aphanisticus hargreavesi Obenberger, 1928
- Aphanisticus harlequin Obenberger, 1944
- Aphanisticus helferi Cobos, 1964
- Aphanisticus herbigradus Obenberger, 1937
- Aphanisticus hewitti Kerremans, 1912
- Aphanisticus horaki Kalashian, 2003
- Aphanisticus hova Kerremans, 1899
- Aphanisticus imitator Théry, 1948
- Aphanisticus immixtus Obenberger, 1928
- Aphanisticus impressicollis Deyrolle, 1864
- Aphanisticus impressipennis Fairmaire, 1901
- Aphanisticus inaequalicollis Obenberger, 1937
- Aphanisticus incostatus Théry, 1930
- Aphanisticus indicus Obenberger, 1928
- Aphanisticus inornatus Théry, 1905
- Aphanisticus insculptus Fåhraeus in Boheman, 1851
- Aphanisticus insularis Kerremans, 1894
- Aphanisticus insulicolus Cobos, 1959
- Aphanisticus intaminatus Obenberger, 1928
- Aphanisticus integer Théry, 1930
- Aphanisticus integricollis Théry, 1905
- Aphanisticus ituricolus Obenberger, 1937
- Aphanisticus ituriensis Obenberger, 1928
- Aphanisticus jakobsoni Obenberger, 1928
- Aphanisticus javaecola Obenberger, 1932
- Aphanisticus javanicus Obenberger, 1928
- Aphanisticus jendeki Kalashian, 2005
- Aphanisticus juvencus Théry, 1930
- Aphanisticus kabakovi Kalashian, 1993
- Aphanisticus kalabi Kalashian, 2003
- Aphanisticus kalshoveni Obenberger, 1931
- Aphanisticus kanabei Kaszab, 1940
- Aphanisticus kaszabi Cobos, 1968
- Aphanisticus kerremansi Théry, 1930
- Aphanisticus kiniaticus Obenberger, 1928
- Aphanisticus klapperichi Obenberger, 1944
- Aphanisticus kolibaci Kalashian, 1999
- Aphanisticus krusemanni Obenberger, 1937
- Aphanisticus kubani Kalashian, 1996
- Aphanisticus lacertus Théry, 1930
- Aphanisticus laetus Théry, 1930
- Aphanisticus lafermei Novak, 2003
- Aphanisticus lamellicornis Théry, 1930
- Aphanisticus latro Théry, 1930
- Aphanisticus latus Kerremans, 1903
- Aphanisticus lembanus Kerremans, 1912
- Aphanisticus leonensis Kerremans, 1903
- Aphanisticus leonigena Obenberger, 1928
- Aphanisticus lepidus Obenberger, 1928
- Aphanisticus levipennis Kerremans, 1900
- Aphanisticus limayicus Obenberger, 1928
- Aphanisticus lineolatus Obenberger, 1928
- Aphanisticus lineoliger Obenberger, 1937
- Aphanisticus lubopetri Kalashian, 2004
- Aphanisticus lumareti Kalashian, 1999
- Aphanisticus lunifrons Théry, 1930
- Aphanisticus luzonicolus Obenberger, 1928
- Aphanisticus madagascariensis Obenberger, 1937
- Aphanisticus maleficus Théry, 1905
- Aphanisticus malignus Théry, 1930
- Aphanisticus mandarinus Gebhardt, 1928
- Aphanisticus marginicollis Gestro, 1877
- Aphanisticus margotanae Novak, 1993
- Aphanisticus marseulii Tournier, 1868
- Aphanisticus martini Descarpentries & Villiers, 1963
- Aphanisticus mascarenicus Descarpentries, 1973
- Aphanisticus masoni Théry, 1930
- Aphanisticus massaicus Théry, 1930
- Aphanisticus mathiauxi Théry, 1930
- Aphanisticus maynaei Kerremans, 1912
- Aphanisticus mendax Théry, 1930
- Aphanisticus metallescens Kerremans, 1892
- Aphanisticus microcephalus Kalashian, 2003
- Aphanisticus micros Théry, 1930
- Aphanisticus miguelicus Obenberger, 1928
- Aphanisticus miles Obenberger, 1928
- Aphanisticus mindanaoensis Fisher, 1921
- Aphanisticus minutus Kerremans, 1896
- Aphanisticus mirandulus Obenberger, 1937
- Aphanisticus missus Obenberger, 1937
- Aphanisticus mitratus (Chevrolat, 1838)
- Aphanisticus montanus Fisher, 1926
- Aphanisticus moultoni Kerremans, 1912
- Aphanisticus mrazeki Obenberger, 1928
- Aphanisticus munroi Obenberger, 1928
- Aphanisticus mutator Théry, 1930
- Aphanisticus nanissimus Obenberger, 1937
- Aphanisticus natalensis Théry, 1930
- Aphanisticus natalicola Obenberger, 1928
- Aphanisticus nervosus Kerremans, 1903
- Aphanisticus nigerrimus Kerremans, 1896
- Aphanisticus nigritorum Obenberger, 1928
- Aphanisticus nigroaeneus Kerremans, 1900
- Aphanisticus nitidulipennis Obenberger, 1937
- Aphanisticus nitidus Théry, 1930
- Aphanisticus nocivus Théry, 1930
- Aphanisticus nodosus Gerstäcker, 1871
- Aphanisticus obesus Théry, 1930
- Aphanisticus oblongus Kerremans, 1895
- Aphanisticus observator Obenberger, 1928
- Aphanisticus obsoletulus Obenberger, 1918
- Aphanisticus obtusicornis Théry, 1930
- Aphanisticus okinawanus Ohmomo, 2004
- Aphanisticus opacus (Kerremans, 1913)
- Aphanisticus oreophilus Fisher, 1937
- Aphanisticus oresibatus Obenberger, 1928
- Aphanisticus othello Obenberger, 1928
- Aphanisticus ovalis Kerremans, 1900
- Aphanisticus pacholatkoi Kalashian, 2005
- Aphanisticus pacificus Théry, 1930
- Aphanisticus paradoxus Deyrolle, 1864
- Aphanisticus pendleburyi Fisher, 1933
- Aphanisticus peninsulae Obenberger, 1924
- Aphanisticus perakensis Obenberger, 1924
- Aphanisticus perinetensis Obenberger, 1937
- Aphanisticus perpusillus Obenberger, 1918
- Aphanisticus perraudierei van de Poll, 1892
- Aphanisticus perroti Descarpentries & Villiers, 1963
- Aphanisticus peyerimhoffi Descarpentries, 1949
- Aphanisticus philippinensis Kalashian, 2003
- Aphanisticus piceipennis Fisher, 1921
- Aphanisticus planatus Théry, 1930
- Aphanisticus planidorsulus Obenberger, 1940
- Aphanisticus plantivorus Obenberger, 1937
- Aphanisticus protensus Obenberger, 1928
- Aphanisticus protractipennis Obenberger, 1928
- Aphanisticus pseudochloris Kalashian, 2003
- Aphanisticus pulex Théry, 1930
- Aphanisticus pullus Fåhraeus in Boheman, 1851
- Aphanisticus pumilio Fåhraeus in Boheman, 1851
- Aphanisticus punctatostriatus Théry, 1930
- Aphanisticus punctulivertex Obenberger, 1944
- Aphanisticus pusillus (Olivier, 1790)
- Aphanisticus putus Obenberger, 1937
- Aphanisticus pycnus Obenberger, 1937
- Aphanisticus pygmaeus Lucas, 1846
- Aphanisticus quadraticollis Obenberger, 1928
- Aphanisticus raffrayi Théry, 1930
- Aphanisticus rarus Théry, 1930
- Aphanisticus rhynchophorus Obenberger, 1928
- Aphanisticus rollei Théry, 1912
- Aphanisticus rondoni Baudon, 1962
- Aphanisticus rotundicollis Théry, 1912
- Aphanisticus sagax Théry, 1930
- Aphanisticus sandakanus Obenberger, 1924
- Aphanisticus satanas Deyrolle, 1864
- Aphanisticus scheitzae Burgeon, 1941
- Aphanisticus schroderi Théry, 1930
- Aphanisticus schuhi Novak, 1995
- Aphanisticus scotti Théry, 1937
- Aphanisticus sculptipennis Bílý, 1983
- Aphanisticus semicaeruleus Théry, 1930
- Aphanisticus seriepunctatus Obenberger, 1928
- Aphanisticus shimoganus Obenberger, 1940
- Aphanisticus sicardi Théry, 1905
- Aphanisticus similis Théry, 1930
- Aphanisticus simplex Fairmaire, 1901
- Aphanisticus sinicolus Obenberger, 1944
- Aphanisticus snizeki Kalashian & Kubáň, 2026
- Aphanisticus somalicus Théry, 1930
- Aphanisticus soppoensis Obenberger, 1928
- Aphanisticus soppongi Kalashian, 2004
- Aphanisticus soudeki Obenberger, 1928
- Aphanisticus straeleni Théry, 1948
- Aphanisticus stramineus Obenberger, 1937
- Aphanisticus strandi Obenberger, 1928
- Aphanisticus strandianus Obenberger, 1928
- Aphanisticus strangulatus Théry, 1930
- Aphanisticus striatipennis Kalashian, 2003
- Aphanisticus subcylindricus Théry, 1930
- Aphanisticus subfasciatus Motschulsky, 1861
- Aphanisticus sugonjaevi Alexeev in Alexeev, et al., 1992
- Aphanisticus sulcicollis Walker, 1858
- Aphanisticus sulculiceps Obenberger, 1937
- Aphanisticus sumatrensis Kerremans, 1900
- Aphanisticus swierstrae Obenberger, 1928
- Aphanisticus taciturnus Kerremans, 1898
- Aphanisticus tananarivensis Obenberger, 1937
- Aphanisticus tanovanensis Obenberger, 1937
- Aphanisticus tassii Baudon, 1968
- Aphanisticus taurus Théry, 1930
- Aphanisticus tennasserimi Obenberger, 1928
- Aphanisticus tenuolus Obenberger, 1937
- Aphanisticus tessmanni Théry, 1930
- Aphanisticus theodori Obenberger, 1928
- Aphanisticus theryellus Obenberger, 1937
- Aphanisticus tondui Théry, 1912
- Aphanisticus trachyformis Fisher, 1921
- Aphanisticus triangularis Théry, 1930
- Aphanisticus turneri Théry, 1930
- Aphanisticus ugandae Théry, 1930
- Aphanisticus ukerewensis Obenberger, 1937
- Aphanisticus ukerewigena Obenberger, 1940
- Aphanisticus unicolor Fisher, 1921
- Aphanisticus vanderijsti Obenberger, 1928
- Aphanisticus vasculus Théry, 1930
- Aphanisticus vaulogeri Descarpentries & Villiers, 1963
- Aphanisticus vicinus Kerremans, 1896
- Aphanisticus victoriae Kerremans, 1910
- Aphanisticus vietnamensis Kalashian, 2004
- Aphanisticus viridicornis Théry, 1930
- Aphanisticus viridipennis Kerremans, 1900
- Aphanisticus viridisignatus Kalashian, 2004
- Aphanisticus viti Kalashian, 2004
- Aphanisticus volkovitshi Kalashian, 1994
- Aphanisticus vulcanus Théry, 1948
- Aphanisticus waterloti Théry, 1930
- Aphanisticus weyersi Kerremans, 1900
- Aphanisticus wittei Théry, 1948
- Aphanisticus yasumatsui Kurosawa, 1954
- Aphanisticus zambesicus Obenberger, 1928
- Aphanisticus zanzibaricus Obenberger, 1928
- Aphanisticus zulu Théry, 1930
- Aphanisticus zuluanus Obenberger, 1928
