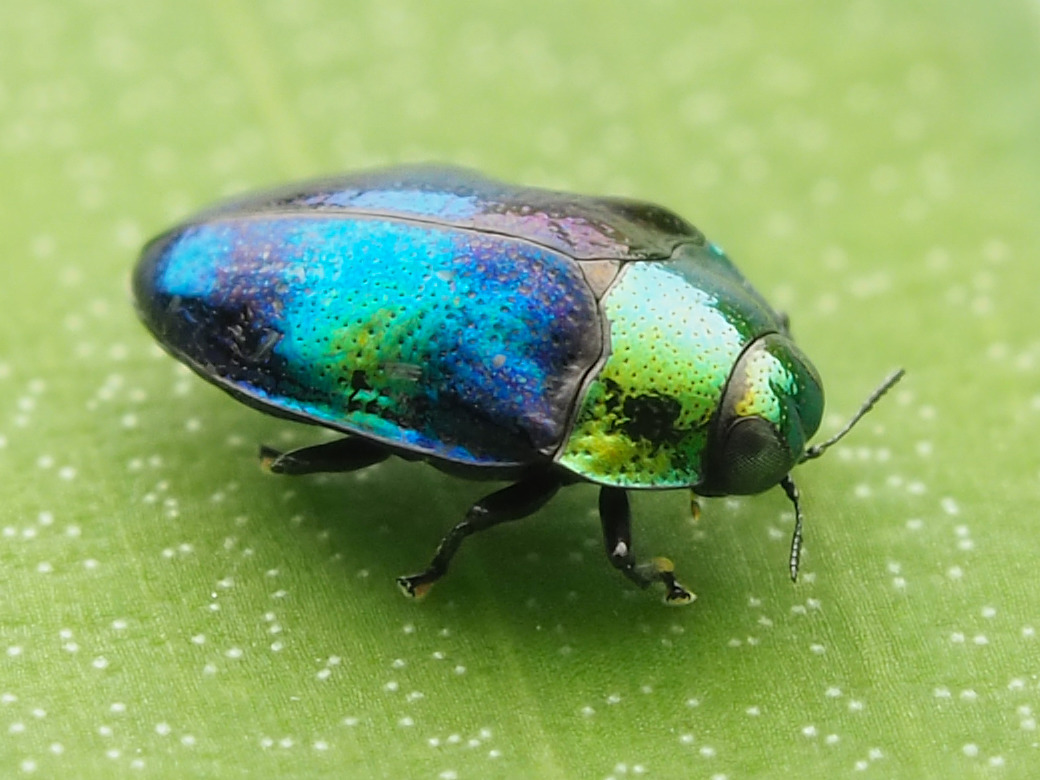
- Leiopleura sp., Belize

Scientific classification
- Kingdom: Animalia
- Phylum: Arthropoda
- Class: Insecta
- Order: Coleoptera
- Suborder: Polyphaga
- Infraorder: Elateriformia
- Family: Buprestidae
- Subfamily: Agrilinae
- Tribe: Tracheini
- Genus: Leiopleura; Deyrolle, 1864

Synonyms
- Enbrachys Fisher, 1935; Leiopleurella Fisher, 1922; Liopleura Kerremans, 1892

= Leiopleura =

Genus of beetles

Leiopleura is a genus of metallic wood-boring beetles in the family Buprestidae. There are more than 150 described species in Leiopleura, found in the Neotropics and Oceania.

== Species ==
These 152 species belong to the genus Leiopleura:

- Leiopleura achardi Obenberger, 1936
- Leiopleura aenea Kerremans, 1899
- Leiopleura aeneifrons Waterhouse, 1889
- Leiopleura aerata (Kirsch, 1873)
- Leiopleura amica Kerremans, 1896
- Leiopleura ana Thomson, 1878
- Leiopleura anniae Obenberger, 1936
- Leiopleura aphrodyte Obenberger, 1936
- Leiopleura argentina Obenberger, 1922
- Leiopleura artemis Obenberger, 1936
- Leiopleura attenuata Fisher, 1922
- Leiopleura balachowskyi Descarpentries, 1970
- Leiopleura balloui Fisher, 1938
- Leiopleura basalis Waterhouse, 1889
- Leiopleura beltii Waterhouse, 1897
- Leiopleura bicolor Fisher, 1922
- Leiopleura binderi Obenberger, 1924
- Leiopleura boliviana Fisher, 1925
- Leiopleura brasiliensis Kerremans, 1903
- Leiopleura bruchiana Obenberger, 1936
- Leiopleura buscki Fisher, 1922
- Leiopleura cantareirae Obenberger, 1936
- Leiopleura capitata (Fabricius, 1801)
- Leiopleura carbonata (LeConte, 1860)
- Leiopleura catharinae Obenberger, 1936
- Leiopleura cayennarum Obenberger, 1936
- Leiopleura cincta Kerremans, 1899
- Leiopleura clara Kerremans, 1897
- Leiopleura claveri Kerremans, 1900
- Leiopleura coeruleicollis Kerremans, 1897
- Leiopleura collaris Kerremans, 1899
- Leiopleura colorata Kerremans, 1899
- Leiopleura communis Obenberger, 1922
- Leiopleura compactilis Chevrolat, 1867
- Leiopleura concinna (Gory, 1841)
- Leiopleura contigua Waterhouse, 1889
- Leiopleura convexa Waterhouse, 1889
- Leiopleura corax Obenberger, 1936
- Leiopleura corumbae Obenberger, 1922
- Leiopleura costaricana Obenberger, 1936
- Leiopleura crassa Waterhouse, 1889
- Leiopleura cuprascens Obenberger, 1922
- Leiopleura cupriceps Kerremans, 1899
- Leiopleura cupricollis Kerremans, 1896
- Leiopleura cyaneifrons Obenberger, 1936
- Leiopleura cyanura Kerremans, 1897
- Leiopleura darlingtoni Fisher, 1940
- Leiopleura dilatata Obenberger, 1924
- Leiopleura distincta Kerremans, 1896
- Leiopleura dives Kerremans, 1896
- Leiopleura divina Obenberger, 1922
- Leiopleura divisa Waterhouse, 1889
- Leiopleura dorsalis Thomson, 1879
- Leiopleura dubia Kerremans, 1897
- Leiopleura elongata Kerremans, 1897
- Leiopleura fallax Kerremans, 1896
- Leiopleura fisherella Obenberger, 1934
- Leiopleura fisheri (Obenberger, 1932)
- Leiopleura gemma Obenberger, 1936
- Leiopleura gibbipennis (Fisher, 1940)
- Leiopleura gibbosa Kerremans, 1896
- Leiopleura gorai Fisher, 1925
- Leiopleura goryi (Thomson, 1878)
- Leiopleura grandis Kerremans, 1896
- Leiopleura guyanensis Obenberger, 1936
- Leiopleura hansi Obenberger, 1924
- Leiopleura hera Obenberger, 1936
- Leiopleura hypocrita Kerremans, 1896
- Leiopleura inaequalis Kerremans, 1894
- Leiopleura inca Kerremans, 1899
- Leiopleura incerta Kerremans, 1896
- Leiopleura inornata (Kirsch, 1873)
- Leiopleura intermedia Waterhouse, 1889
- Leiopleura interrupta Waterhouse, 1889
- Leiopleura iunctiseta Obenberger, 1936
- Leiopleura iviei Hespenheide & Bellamy, 2004
- Leiopleura jakobsoni Obenberger, 1936
- Leiopleura jakovlevi Obenberger, 1936
- Leiopleura klapaleki Obenberger, 1924
- Leiopleura klickai Obenberger, 1937
- Leiopleura lata Kerremans, 1894
- Leiopleura lateralis Waterhouse, 1889
- Leiopleura leprosa Obenberger, 1924
- Leiopleura levis Kerremans, 1894
- Leiopleura limae Obenberger, 1936
- Leiopleura loretana Obenberger, 1936
- Leiopleura luederwaldti Obenberger, 1936
- Leiopleura melaena Obenberger, 1936
- Leiopleura melichari (Obenberger, 1922)
- Leiopleura mexicana Obenberger, 1922
- Leiopleura minuta Kerremans, 1894
- Leiopleura modesta Kerremans, 1896
- Leiopleura moerens Kerremans, 1896
- Leiopleura mrazi Obenberger, 1922
- Leiopleura mutabilis Fisher, 1922
- Leiopleura nickerli Obenberger, 1922
- Leiopleura nigra Waterhouse, 1889
- Leiopleura nigrita (Gory, 1841)
- Leiopleura nigrocoerulea Obenberger, 1917
- Leiopleura nitidicollis Kerremans, 1894
- Leiopleura nobilis (Kirsch, 1873)
- Leiopleura ogloblini Obenberger, 1936
- Leiopleura opacipennis Obenberger, 1936
- Leiopleura otero (Fisher, 1935)
- Leiopleura ovata Kerremans, 1896
- Leiopleura pacifica Kerremans, 1896
- Leiopleura pallidicollis Kerremans, 1897
- Leiopleura paraguayensis Obenberger, 1922
- Leiopleura parallela (Kerremans, 1899)
- Leiopleura parvula Waterhouse, 1889
- Leiopleura peruviae Obenberger, 1936
- Leiopleura peruviana Kerremans, 1899
- Leiopleura picea Fisher, 1922
- Leiopleura plagidorsis (Obenberger, 1932)
- Leiopleura polita Waterhouse, 1889
- Leiopleura puella Kerremans, 1896
- Leiopleura pulchra Waterhouse, 1889
- Leiopleura puncticeps Waterhouse, 1889
- Leiopleura purpureipennis Fisher, 1922
- Leiopleura pygmaea Kerremans, 1899
- Leiopleura rosae Bellamy, 1998
- Leiopleura rotundata Kerremans, 1897
- Leiopleura rugosa (Fabricius, 1801)
- Leiopleura santaecrucis Obenberger, 1936
- Leiopleura satanella Obenberger, 1922
- Leiopleura schroederi Obenberger, 1936
- Leiopleura semenovi (Obenberger, 1932)
- Leiopleura similis Obenberger, 1922
- Leiopleura simillima Obenberger, 1922
- Leiopleura socialis Kerremans, 1896
- Leiopleura soror Kerremans, 1896
- Leiopleura splendida (Fisher, 1922)
- Leiopleura srogli Obenberger, 1924
- Leiopleura steinbachi Obenberger, 1936
- Leiopleura strandi Obenberger, 1936
- Leiopleura subcircularis Kerremans, 1896
- Leiopleura subopaca Fisher, 1922
- Leiopleura tabaci Kerremans, 1896
- Leiopleura tristicula Obenberger, 1937
- Leiopleura tristis (Kirsch, 1873)
- Leiopleura trivialis Waterhouse, 1889
- Leiopleura trochilus Kerremans, 1896
- Leiopleura tuberculipennis Cobos, 1978
- Leiopleura unicolor Kerremans, 1896
- Leiopleura uvarovi (Obenberger, 1932)
- Leiopleura vanrooni Obenberger, 1923
- Leiopleura vavrai Obenberger, 1922
- Leiopleura venusta Waterhouse, 1889
- Leiopleura venustula (Gory, 1841)
- Leiopleura viridiceps Kerremans, 1899
- Leiopleura viridicollis (Gory, 1841)
- Leiopleura viridifrons Waterhouse, 1889
