= Leiopleura otero =

Scientific classification
- Domain: Eukaryota
- Kingdom: Animalia
- Phylum: Arthropoda
- Class: Insecta
- Order: Coleoptera
- Suborder: Polyphaga
- Infraorder: Elateriformia
- Family: Buprestidae
- Genus: Leiopleura
- Species: L. otero

Binomial name
- Leiopleura otero (Fisher, 1935)

Species of beetle

Leiopleura otero is a species of metallic wood-boring beetle in the family Buprestidae. It is found in the Caribbean Sea and North America.
