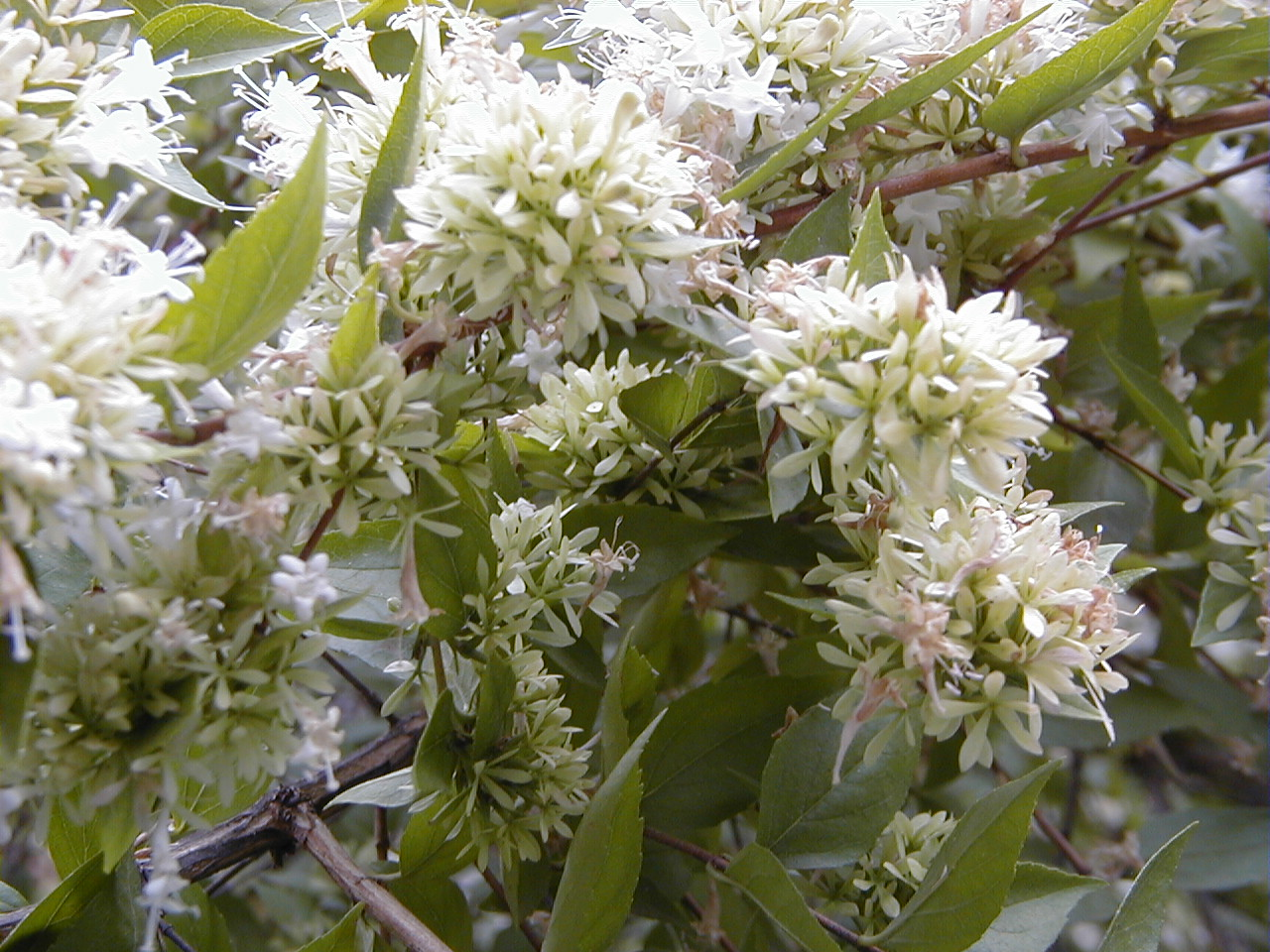
- Abelia chinensis

Scientific classification
- Kingdom: Plantae
- Clade: Embryophytes
- Clade: Tracheophytes
- Clade: Angiosperms
- Clade: Eudicots
- Clade: Asterids
- Order: Dipsacales
- Family: Caprifoliaceae
- Subfamily: Linnaeoideae
- Genus: Abelia; R.Br. (1818)

Species
- Abelia chinensis R.Br.; Abelia forrestii (Diels) W.W.Sm.; Abelia macrotera (Graebn. & Buchw.) Rehder; Abelia parvifolia Hemsl.; Abelia schumannii (Graebn.) Rehder; Abelia uniflora R.Br.

= Abelia =

Genus of flowering plants

Abelia /əˈbiːliə/ is a genus of flowering plants in the honeysuckle family, Caprifoliaceae. The genus currently includes six species native to China, Taiwan, and Vietnam.

The genus previously contained about 30 species and hybrids. Molecular phylogenetic studies showed that the genus was not monophyletic. Abelia section Zabelia was raised to the genus Zabelia, and the majority of Abelia species have been transferred to other genera, including Diabelia, Lonicera, and Vesalea.

== Description ==
Species of Abelia are shrubs from 1–6 m tall. Species from warm climates are evergreen, and colder climate species deciduous. The leaves are opposite or in whorls of three, ovate, glossy, dark green, 1.5–8 cm long, turning purplish-bronze to red in autumn in the deciduous species. The flowers appear in the upper leaf axils and stem ends, 1-8 together in a short cyme; they are pendulous, white to pink, bell-shaped with a five-lobed corolla, 1–5 cm long, and usually scented. Flowering continues over a long and continuous period from late spring to fall.

Some of these species are cultivated as ornamental garden plants, and may still be described as Abelia in horticultural listings. A notable example is the hybrid Abelia × grandiflora.

== Taxonomy ==
The generic name commemorates Clarke Abel, a keen naturalist who accompanied Lord Amherst's unsuccessful embassy to China in 1816 as a surgeon, under the sponsorship of Sir Joseph Banks. All of Abel's seeds and plants were lost in a shipwreck on the homeward voyage, however; living plants of Abelia chinensis were first imported to England in 1844 by Robert Fortune.

Some species placed in Abelia were transferred to Linnaea at various times from 1872 onwards, but these transfers were not accepted by most botanists. Molecular phylogenetic studies showed that a number of genera traditionally placed in the tribe Linnaeeae were closely related, but that Abelia was not monophyletic, even with Abelia section Zabelia split off as a separate genus Zabelia. In 2013, Maarten Christenhusz proposed that Abelia and related genera be merged into Linnaea. In 2015 Wang, Landrein, et al. also found that Abelia was polyphyletic, and that Zabelia was more closely related to Morina than to the rest of the subfamily Linnaeoideae. They organized the Linnaeoideae into six monophyletic genera by recognizing Dipelta, Kolkwitzia, and Linnaea as distinct genera, placing the former Mexican species of Abelia in the revived genus Vesalea, creating the new genus Diabelia, and leaving six Asian species in Abelia. Plants of the World Online accepts the circumscription of Wang, Landrein, et al..

== Species ==
Six species are accepted.

- Abelia chinensis R.Br.
- Abelia forrestii (Diels) W.W.Sm.
- Abelia × grandiflora (Rovelli ex André) Rehder (artificial hybrid of A. chinensis × A. uniflora)
- Abelia macrotera (Graebn. & Buchw.) Rehder
- Abelia parvifolia Hemsl.
- Abelia schumannii (Graebn.) Rehder
- Abelia uniflora R.Br.

=== Former species and synonyms ===
Species and synonyms previously placed in Abelia but now placed in other genera include:

- Abelia adenotricha = Lonicera elisae
- Abelia angustifolia = Zabelia angustifolia
- Abelia anhweiensis = Zabelia dielsii
- Abelia biflora = Zabelia biflora
- Abelia brachystemon = Zabelia brachystemon
- Abelia buchwaldii = Diabelia serrata f. buchwaldii
- Abelia buddleioides = Zabelia buddleioides
- Abelia coreana = Zabelia dielsii
- Abelia coriacea = Vesalea coriacea
- Abelia corymbosa = Zabelia corymbosa
- Abelia curviflora = Diabelia sanguinea
- Abelia davidii = Zabelia biflora
- Abelia dielsii = Zabelia dielsii
- Abelia floribunda = Vesalea floribunda
- Abelia grandifolia = Vesalea grandifolia
- Abelia gymnocarpa = Diabelia serrata f. gymnocarpa
- Abelia hersii = Zabelia dielsii
- Abelia hirsuta = Vesalea floribunda var. floribunda
- Abelia insularis = Zabelia biflora
- Abelia integrifolia = Zabelia integrifolia
- Abelia ionostachya = Diabelia ionostachya
- Abelia mexicana = Vesalea mexicana
- Abelia mosanensis = Zabelia tyaihyoni
- Abelia occidentalis = Vesalea occidentalis
- Abelia onkocarpa = Zabelia onkocarpa
- Abelia sanguinea = Diabelia sanguinea
- Abelia serrata = Diabelia serrata
- Abelia shikokiana = Zabelia biflora
- Abelia spathulata = Diabelia spathulata
- Abelia speciosa = Vesalea floribunda var. floribunda
- Abelia splendens = Lonicera fragrantissima subsp. fragrantissima
- Abelia tetrasepala = Diabelia ionostachya var. tetrasepala
- Abelia tomentosa = Diabelia serrata f. tomentosa
- Abelia tyaihyonii = Zabelia tyaihyonii
- Abelia umbellata = Zabelia umbellata
- Abelia zanderi = Zabelia dielsii

== Cultivation ==
Several species of Abelia are in cultivation. Though not fully hardy, they are easy to grow in a sheltered, sunny position. The cultivar 'Edward Goucher' has gained the Royal Horticultural Society's Award of Garden Merit.

== Allergenicity ==
Abelia has an OPALS allergy scale rating of 5 out of 10, indicating moderate potential to cause allergic reactions, exacerbated by over-use of the same plant throughout a garden. People allergic to honeysuckle may experience cross-reactive allergic reactions with Abelia.
