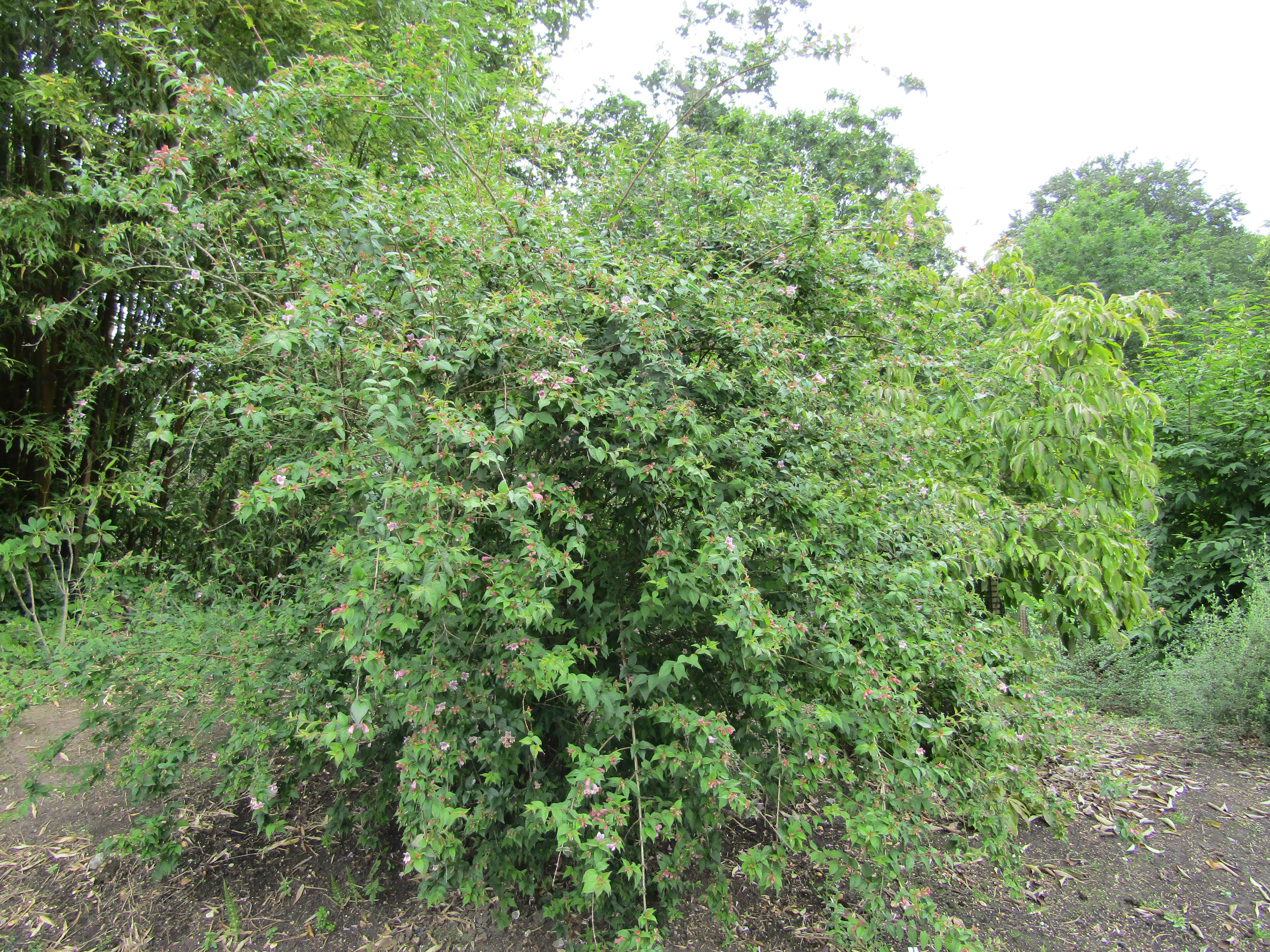
- Abelia parvifolia in cultivation
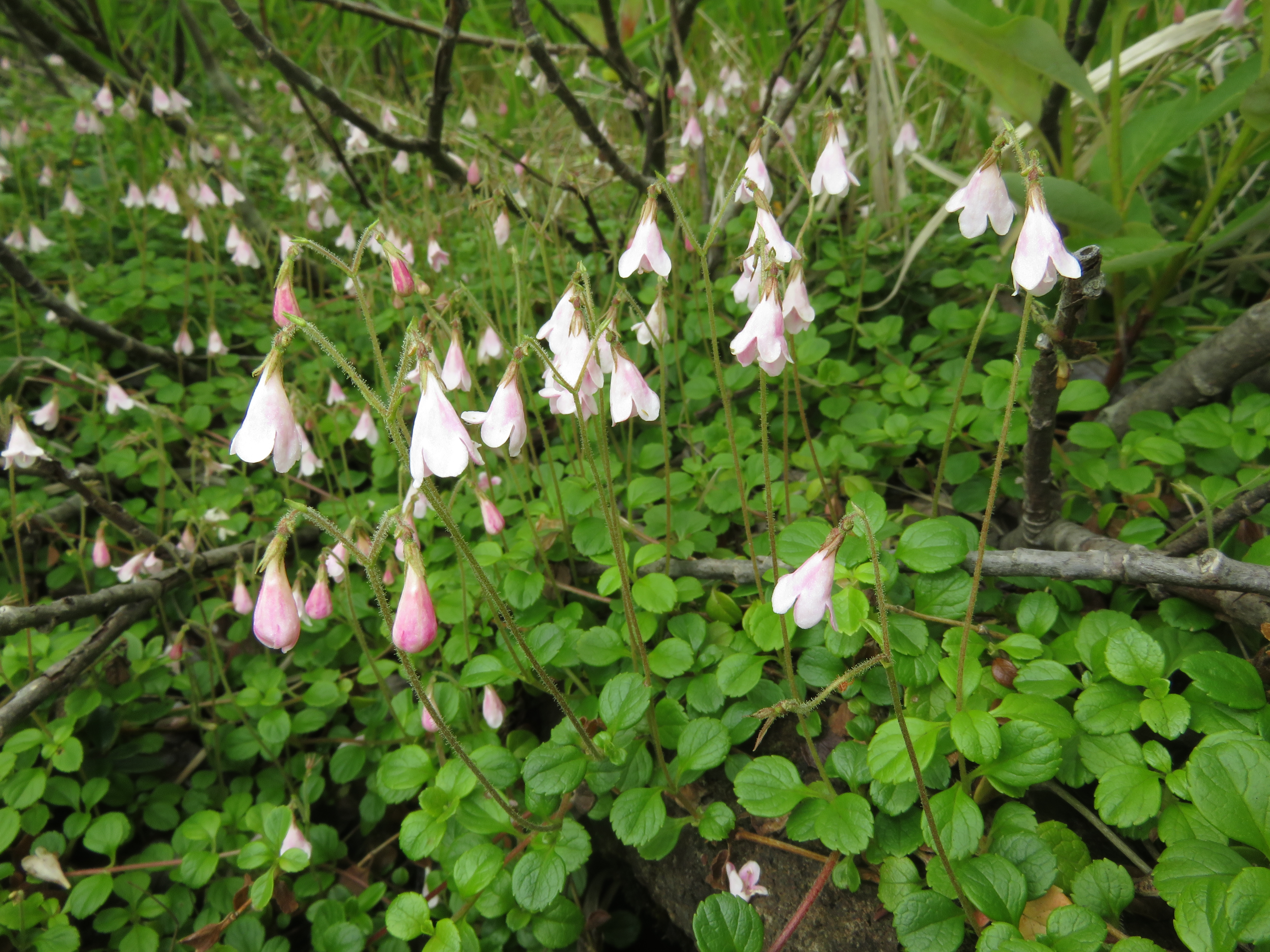
- Linnaea borealis

Scientific classification
- Kingdom: Plantae
- Clade: Tracheophytes
- Clade: Angiosperms
- Clade: Eudicots
- Clade: Asterids
- Order: Dipsacales
- Family: Caprifoliaceae
- Subfamily: Linnaeoideae; Raf.

Genera
- See text.

Synonyms
- Linnaeaceae Backlund

= Linnaeoideae =

Subfamily of plants

Linnaeoideae is a subfamily of the family Caprifoliaceae. It was formerly treated as the separate family Linnaeaceae. Five or six genera are placed in the subfamily, which ranges from creeping to erect shrubs. Most genera and species are native to East Asia, particularly China. One genus is native to Mexico, and Linnaea borealis occurs around the Northern Hemisphere.

== Description ==
Linnaeoideae consists of shrubby plants that are mainly deciduous, but may be evergreen. Some, such as Linnaea, are creeping, others, such as Abelia, may be up to 4 m (13 ft) tall. The usually paired flowers are surrounded by an 'epicalyx' – a structure resembling the calyx that is composed of involucral bracts. A nectary is present inside the tube of the corolla. Two of the three or four locules of the inferior ovary are sterile and are empty at maturity. There are four stamens. The fruit is an achene, topped by usually persistent sepals.

== Taxonomy ==
The subfamily Linnaeoideae was erected by Constantine Samuel Rafinesque in 1820. In 1998, Anders Backlund raised it to the full family Linnaeaceae. The APG IV system reduced it again to a subfamily of Caprifoliaceae, a position supported in a 2024 review of the systematics of the Caprifoliaceae.

=== Genera ===
Six genera were included in a 2015 molecular phylogenetic study of the subfamily. As of January 2024, the same genera were included by the Angiosperm Phylogeny Website, although two of them were synonymized. As of January 2024, all six genera were accepted by Plants of the World Online.

- Abelia R.Br.
- Diabelia Landrein (may be treated as a synonym of Abelia)
- Dipelta Maxim.
- Kolkwitzia Graebn.
- Linnaea L.
- Vesalea M.Martens & Galeotti

Some older sources also include the genus Zabelia, but this is excluded in other sources, which may place it in its own subfamily, Zabelioideae.

=== Phylogeny ===
A study published in 2015 included the following cladogram showing the possible relationships among the genera included in the subfamily. Four purely Asian genera formed a subclade, distinct from the circumboreal Linnaea and the Mexican Vesalea.

- Linnaeoideae
  - - Linnaea
    - Vesalea
  - - - Kolkwitzia
      - - Dipelta
        - Diabelia
    - Abelia

== Distribution ==
Linnaeoideae has a disjoint distribution. Four genera (Abelia, Diabelia, Dipelta, and Kolkwitzia) are native to East Asia, primarily China. Vesalea is native to Mexico. The monospecific genus Linnaea has a very wide distribution throughout the subarctic and temperate Northern Hemisphere.

== Cultivation ==
Some of the shrubby species are grown as ornamental plants. As of December 2024, five cultivars of Abelia had gained the Royal Horticultural Society's Award of Garden Merit, as had one species of Dipelta, one cultivar of Kolkwitzia, and one species of Vesalea.

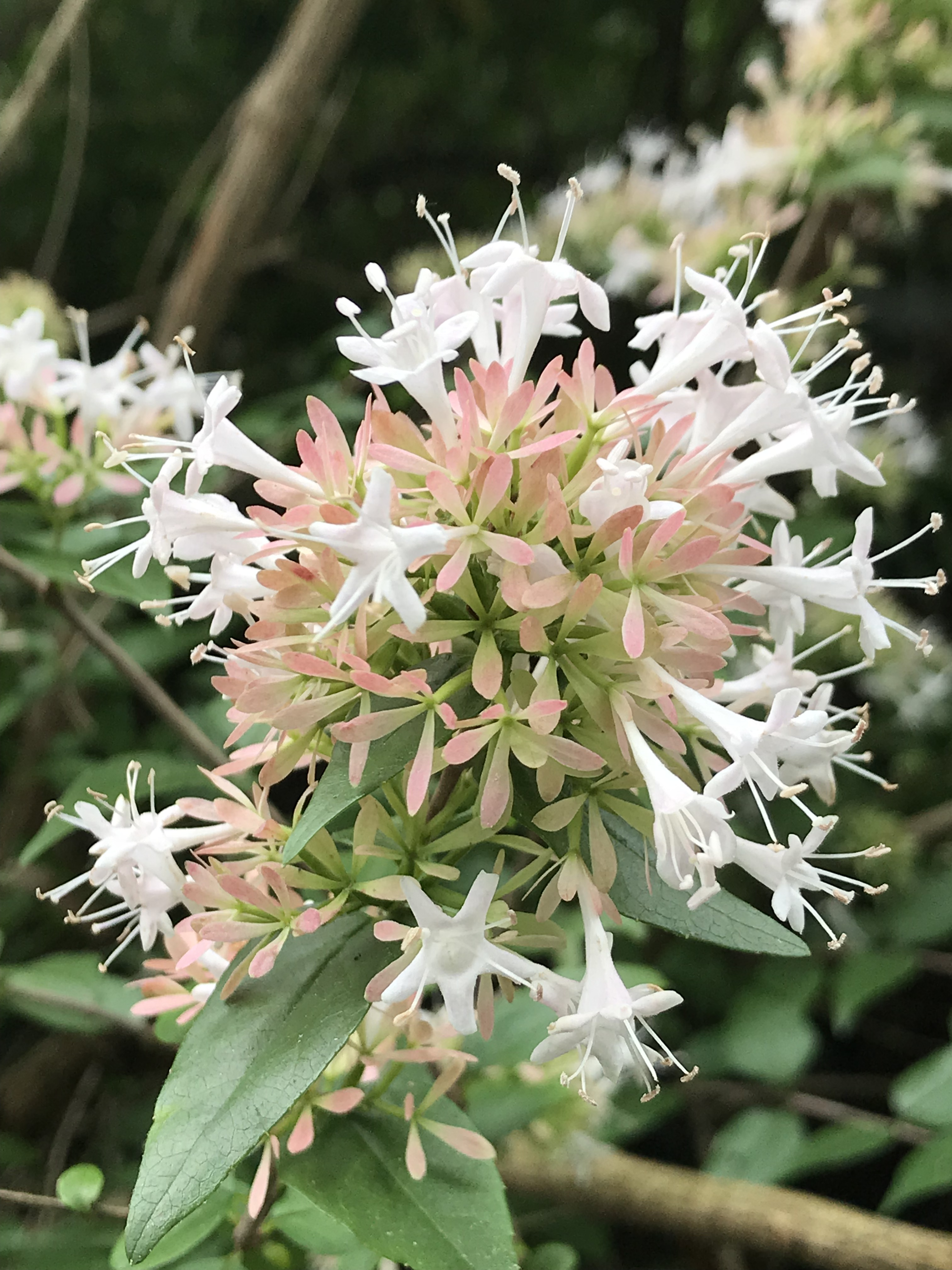
Abelia chinensis

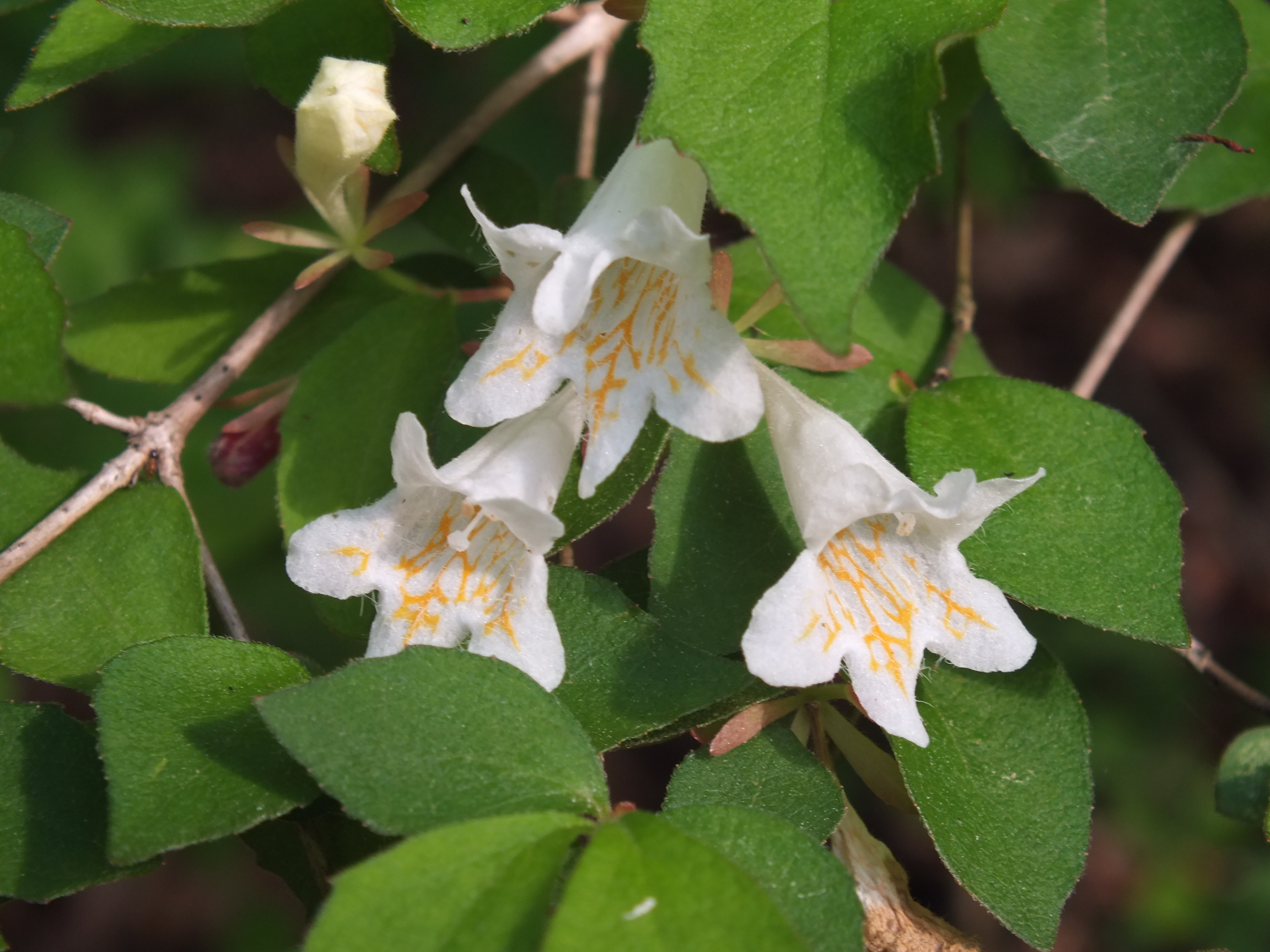
Diabelia spathulata

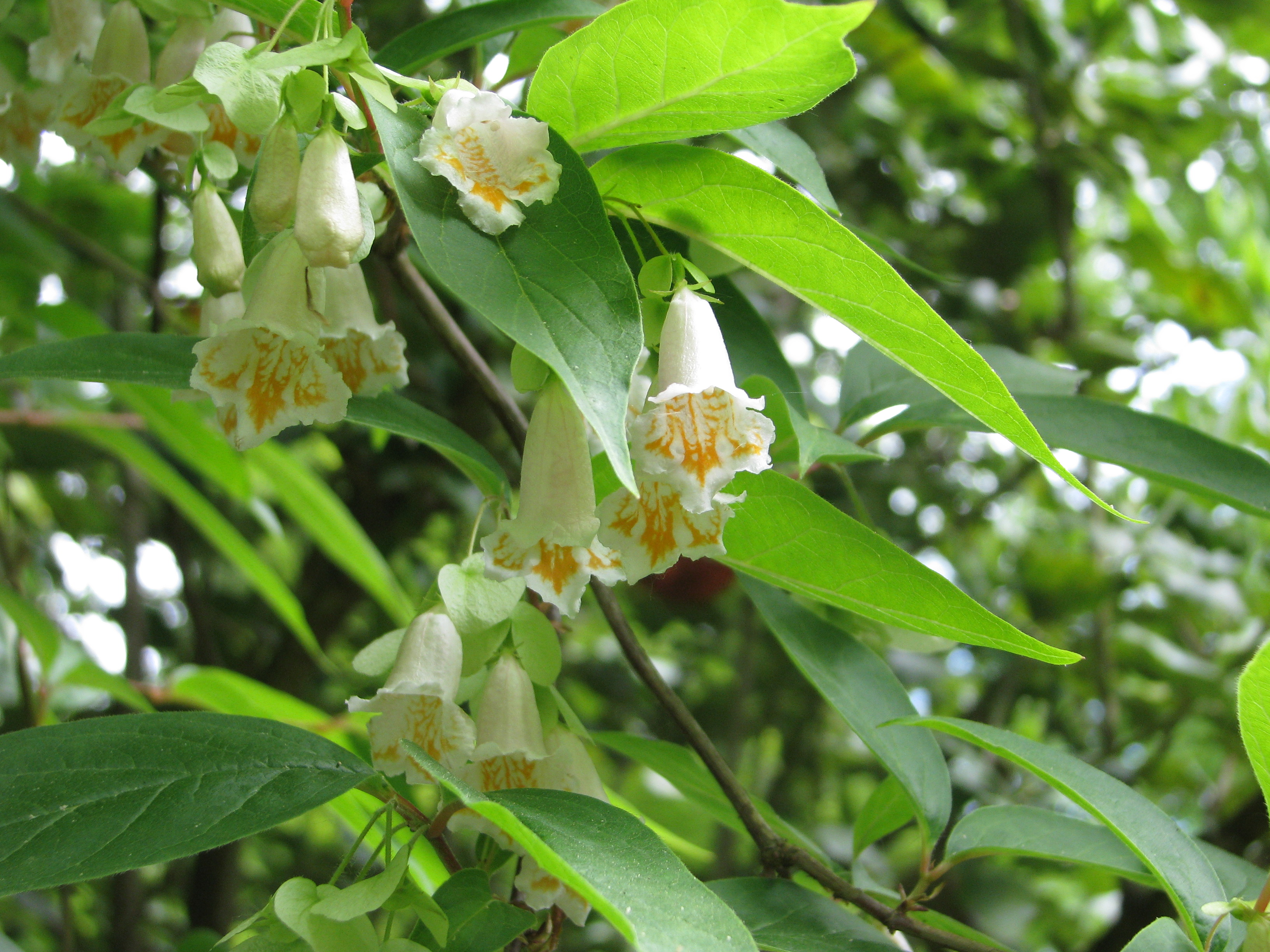
Dipelta floribunda

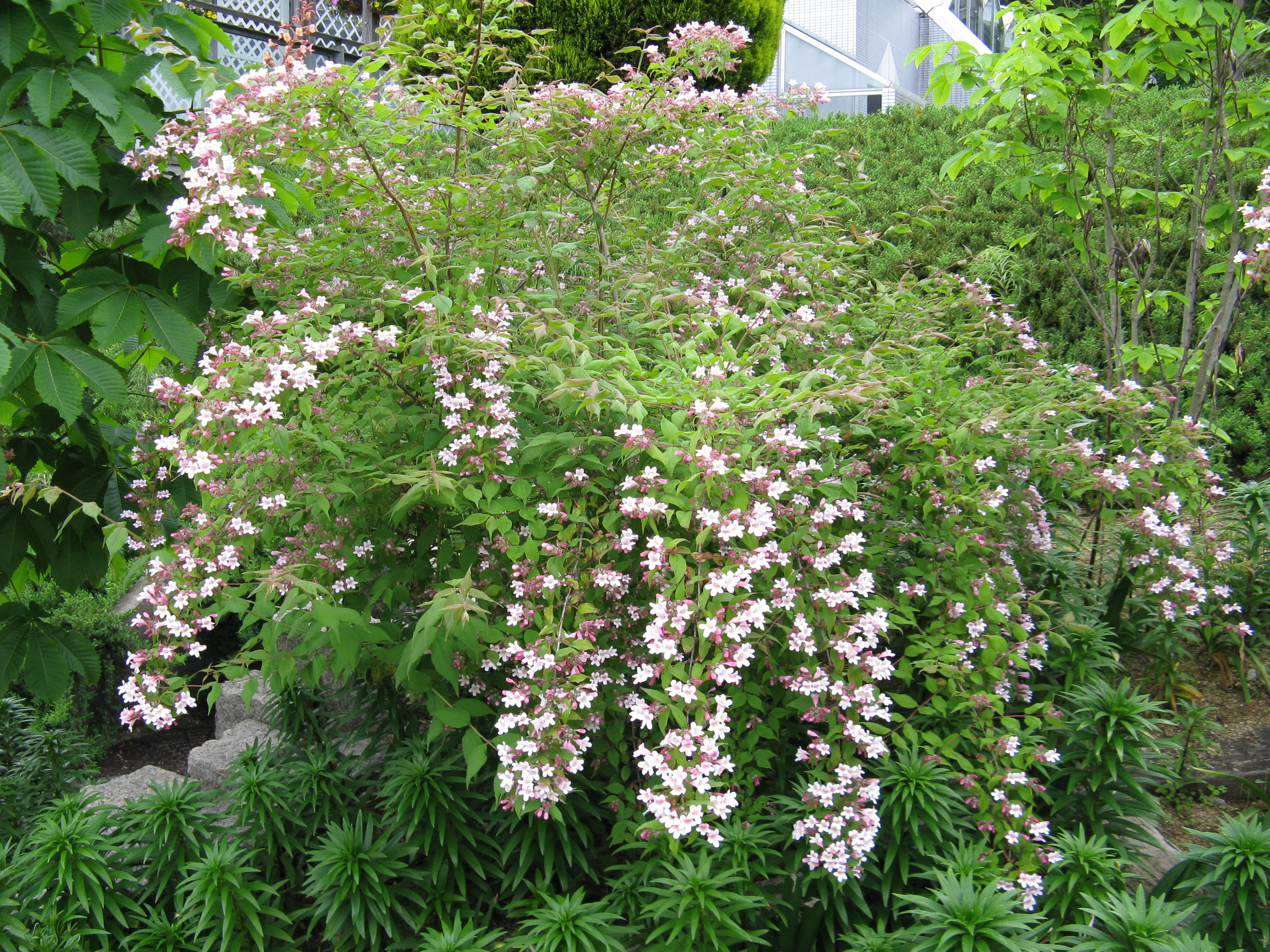
Kolkwitzia amabilis

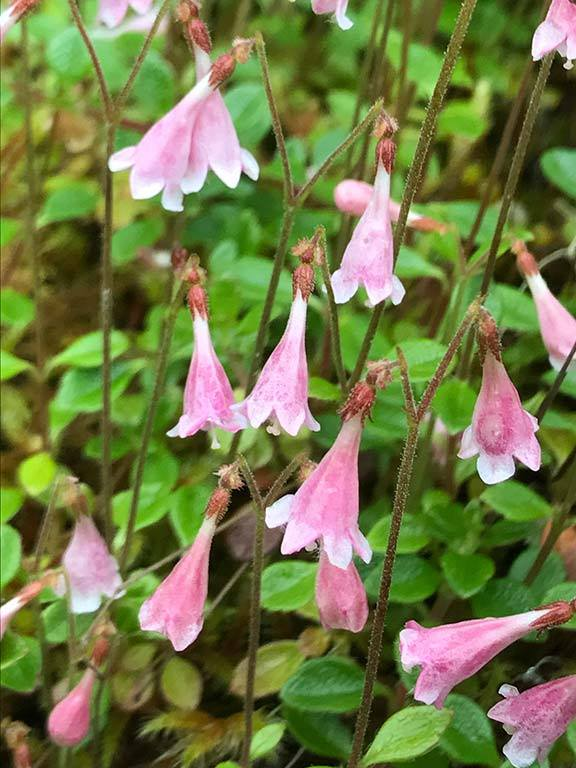
Linnaea borealis

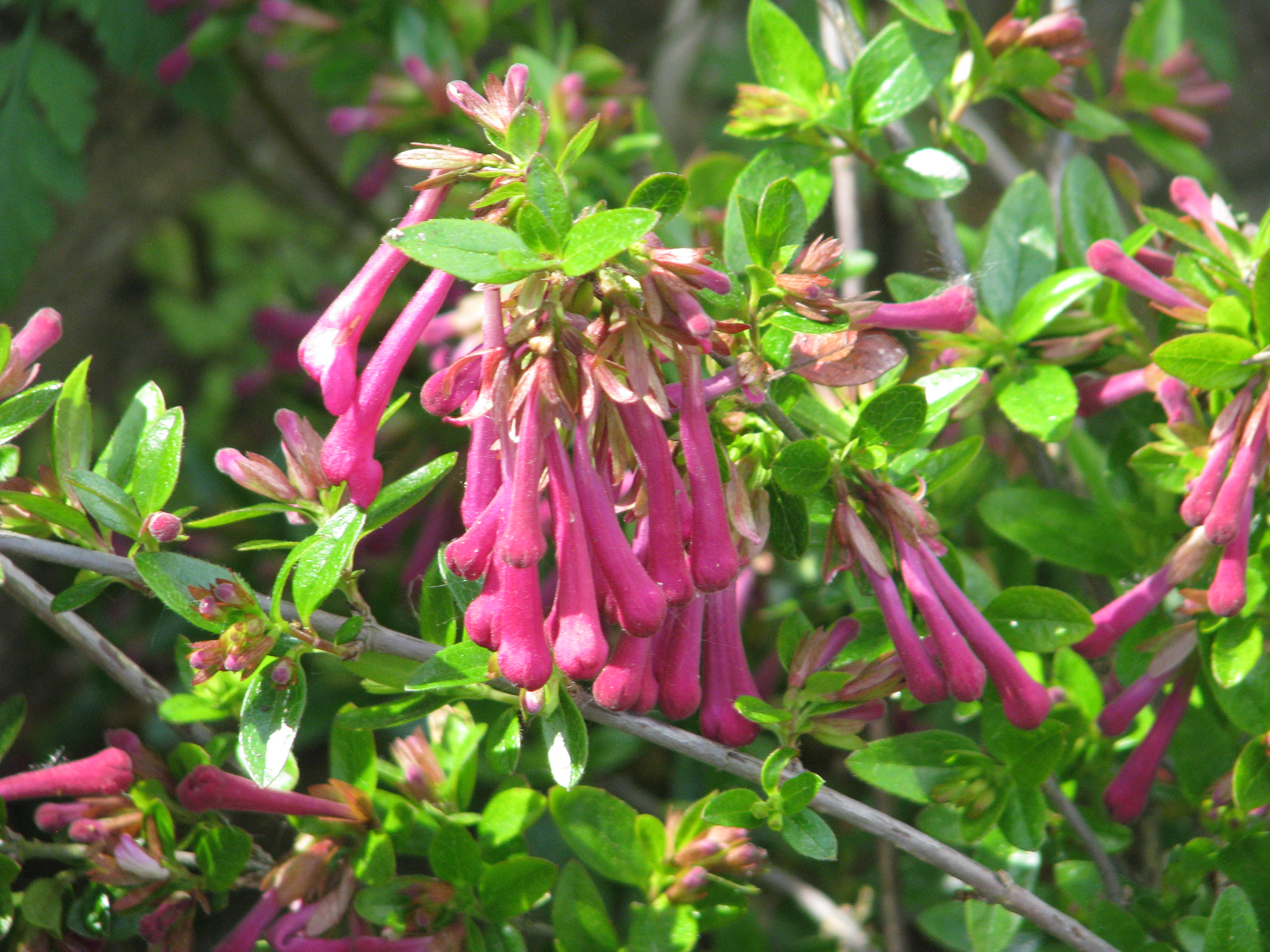
Vesalea floribunda
