= Abelia macrotera =

Scientific classification
- Kingdom: Plantae
- Clade: Tracheophytes
- Clade: Angiosperms
- Clade: Eudicots
- Clade: Asterids
- Order: Dipsacales
- Family: Caprifoliaceae
- Genus: Abelia
- Species: A. macrotera

Binomial name
- Abelia macrotera (Graebn. & Buchw.) Rehder (1911)

Varieties
- Abelia macrotera var. deutziifolia (H.Lév.) Landrein; Abelia macrotera var. engleriana (Graebn.) Landrein; Abelia macrotera var. henanensis Landrein; Abelia macrotera var. macrotera; Abelia macrotera var. mairei (H.Lév.) Landrein; Abelia macrotera var. myrtilloides (Rehder) Landrein; Abelia macrotera var. zabelioides Landrein

Synonyms
- Linnaea macrotera Graebn. & Buchw. (1900)

Species of flowering plant

Abelia macrotera is a species of flowering plant in the honeysuckle family, Caprifoliaceae. It is a shrub native to central and southern China.

== Varieties ==
Seven varieties are accepted.

- Abelia macrotera var. deutziifolia (H.Lév.) Landrein (synonym Abelia deutziifolia (H.Lév.) H.Lév.) – south-central China
- Abelia macrotera var. engleriana (Graebn.) Landrein (synonyms Abelia engleriana (Graebn.) Rehder, Abelia koehneana (Graebn.) Rehder, and Abelia longituba Rehder) – north-central and south-central China
- Abelia macrotera var. henanensis Landrein – Henan Province of southeast China
- Abelia macrotera var. macrotera (synonyms Abelia fargesii Nakai, Abelia graebneriana Rehder, Abelia schischkinii Golubk., Abelia verticillata H.Lév.) – central and southern China
- Abelia macrotera var. mairei (H.Lév.) Landrein (synonym Abelia mairei H.Lév.) – Yunnan Province of south-central China
- Abelia macrotera var. myrtilloides (Rehder) Landrein (synonym Abelia myrtilloides Rehder) – Sichuan Province of south-central China
- Abelia macrotera var. zabelioides Landrein – Sichuan Province of south-central China
