= Prostanthera chlorantha =

Green mintbush

Scientific classification
- Kingdom: Plantae
- Clade: Tracheophytes
- Clade: Angiosperms
- Clade: Eudicots
- Clade: Asterids
- Order: Lamiales
- Family: Lamiaceae
- Genus: Prostanthera
- Species: P. chlorantha

Binomial name
- Prostanthera chlorantha (F.Muell.) F.Muell. ex Benth.
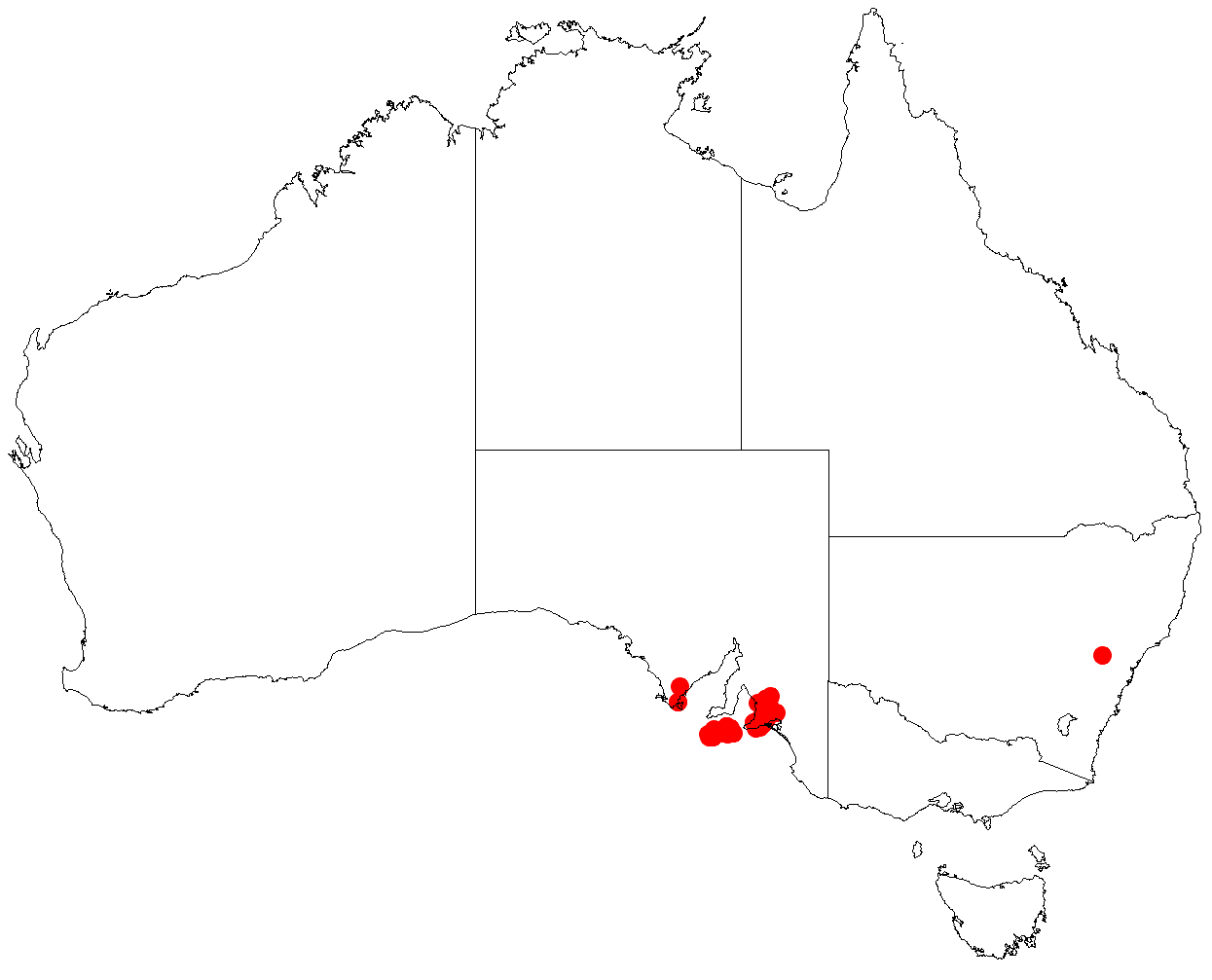
- Occurrence data from AVH

Species of flowering plant

Prostanthera chlorantha, commonly known as green mintbush, is a species of flowering plant in the family Lamiaceae and is endemic to the south-east of South Australia. It is a small shrub with small, broadly egg-shaped to round leaves and mauve, bluish green, or greenish red to greenish yellow flowers with a pink tinge.

== Description ==
Prostanthera chlorantha is a shrub that typically grows to a height of 0.5 m (1 ft 8 in) with more or less cylindrical stems. The leaves are broadly egg-shaped to more or less round, 1–3 mm (0.039–0.118 in) long, 1–2.5 mm (0.039–0.098 in) wide and sessile. The flowers are arranged on pedicels 5–13 mm (0.20–0.51 in) long and the sepals are green, often with reddish-purple streaks, 8–12 mm (0.31–0.47 in) long forming a tube 5–6 mm (0.20–0.24 in) long with two lobes 3–6 mm (0.12–0.24 in) long and 2–4 mm (0.079–0.157 in) wide. The petals are 15–25 mm (0.59–0.98 in), mauve, bluish green, or greenish red to greenish yellow with a pink tinge, and fused to form a tube 10–25 mm (0.39–0.98 in) long. The lower lip has three lobes, the centre lobe 2–5 mm (0.079–0.197 in) long and about 2 mm (0.079 in) wide and the side lobes are 4–5 mm (0.16–0.20 in) long and about 2 mm (0.079 in) wide. The upper lip has is broadly egg-shaped to round 5–10 mm (0.20–0.39 in) long and 10 mm (0.39 in) wide with a small notch in the centre.

== Taxonomy ==
Green mintbush was first formally described in 1853 by Ferdinand von Mueller who gave it the name Klanderia chlorantha in the journal Linnaea. In 1870 Mueller changed the name to Prostanthera chlorantha and the change was published by George Bentham in Flora Australiensis.

== Distribution and habitat ==
Prostanthera chlorantha grows in scattered populations in mallee and shrubland in the south-east of South Australia.
