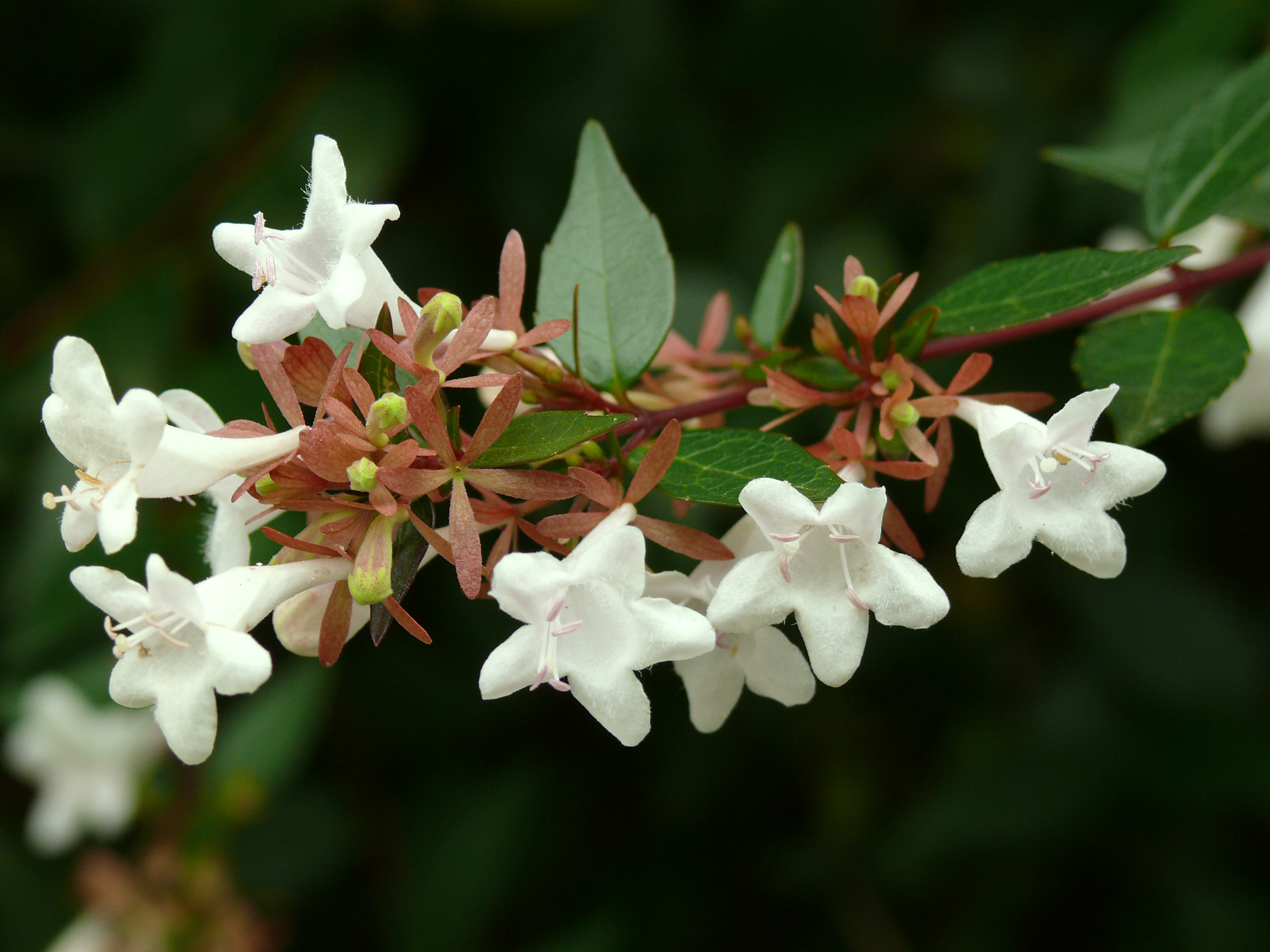

Scientific classification
- Kingdom: Plantae
- Clade: Tracheophytes
- Clade: Angiosperms
- Clade: Eudicots
- Clade: Asterids
- Order: Dipsacales
- Family: Caprifoliaceae
- Genus: Abelia
- Species: A. × grandiflora

Binomial name
- Abelia × grandiflora (Rovelli ex André) Rehder (1900)

Synonyms
- Abelia rupestris var. grandiflora Rovelli ex André (1886); Abelia × rupestris Späth (1892), nom. illeg.; Linnaea × grandiflora (Rovelli ex André) Christenh.(2013)

= Abelia × grandiflora =

Hybrid species of flowering plant

Abelia × grandiflora is a hybrid species of flowering plant in the honeysuckle family Caprifoliaceae, raised by hybridising A. chinensis with A. uniflora.

== Description ==
It is a deciduous or semi-evergreen multistemmed shrub with rounded, spreading, or gracefully arching branches to 1 to 1.8 m (3.3 to 5.9 ft) tall. The leaves are ovate, glossy, dark green, and 2–6 cm (0.8–2.4 in) long. The fragrant flowers are produced in clusters, white, tinged pink, bell-shaped, to 2 cm long. Unlike most flowering shrubs in cultivation, the species blooms from late summer to well into the autumn.

The Latin specific epithet grandiflora means "abundant flowers". "Abelia", the common name and genus name, honors Clarke Abel, physician and naturalist who collected seeds and plants on a British expedition to China in 1817.

== Cultivation ==
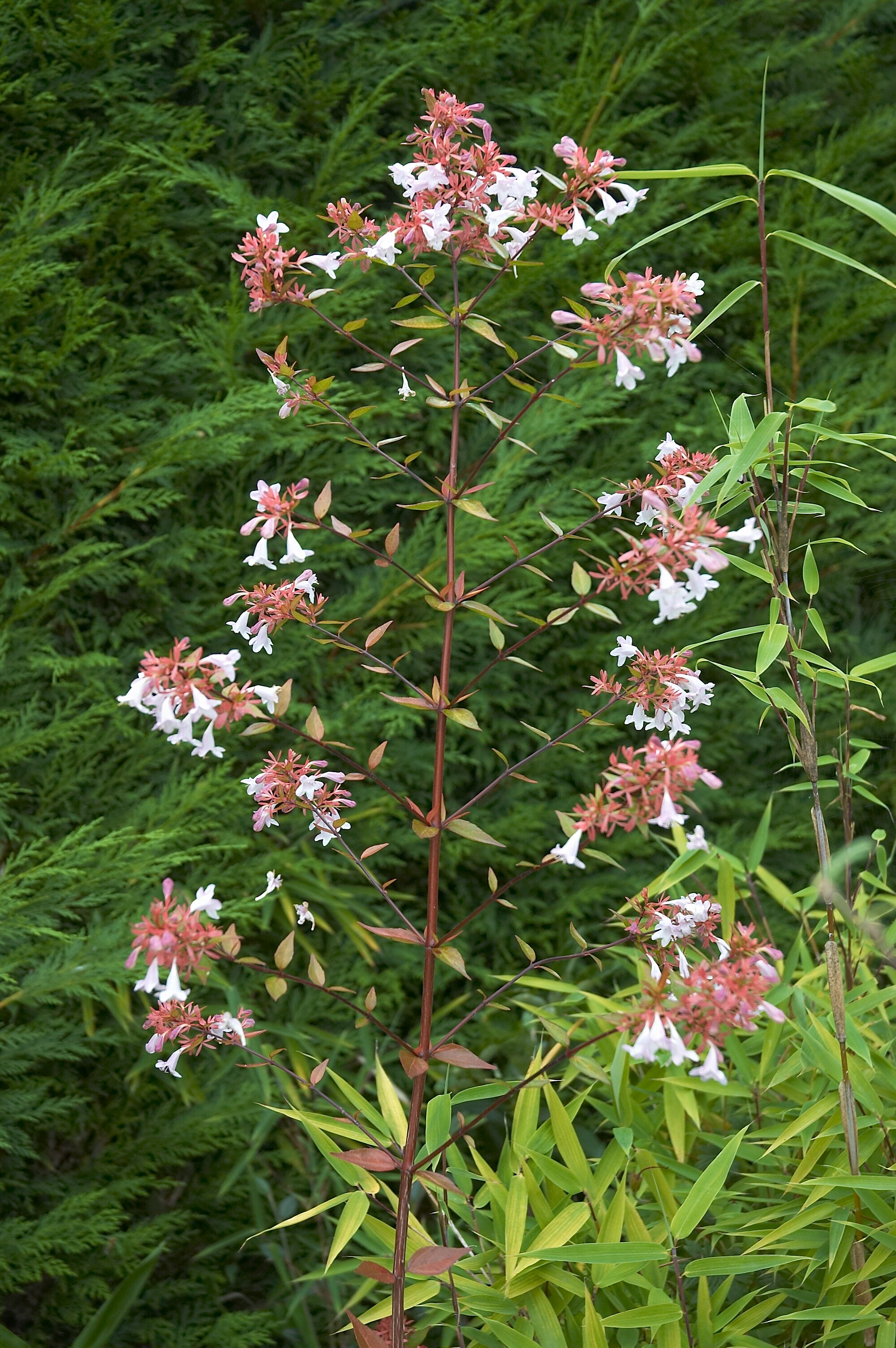
Linnaea × grandiflora 'Conti'

Abelia × grandiflora was first raised in 1886 at the Rovelli nursery at Pallanza (now Verbania), on Lake Maggiore in Italy. It is used as an ornamental plant in specimen plantings in gardens, or in a mixed border with other shrubs. Though relatively easy to cultivate, it is not fully hardy, and requires a sheltered position in full sun. Abelia prefers moist, organically rich soils with good drainage. Propagation is by cuttings. This plant is still widely listed in Australia and the UK under the name Abelia. The variegated cultivar 'Hopleys’, with pale pink flowers and growing to 1.5 m × 1.5 m (4 ft 11 in × 4 ft 11 in), has gained the Royal Horticultural Society's Award of Garden Merit.
