= Karl Moritz Schumann =

German botanist (1851–1904)

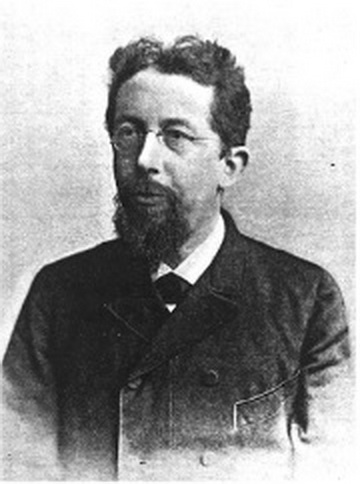
- Born: 17 June 1851; Görlitz
- Died: 22 March 1904 (aged 52); Berlin
- Scientific career
- Institutions: curator of the Botanisches Museum
- Author abbrev. (botany): K. Schum.

Karl Moritz Schumann (17 June 1851 – 22 March 1904) was a German botanist.

Schumann was born in Görlitz. He was curator of the Botanisches Museum in Berlin-Dahlem from 1880 until 1894. He also served as the first chairman of the Deutsche Kakteen-Gesellschaft (German Cactus Society) which he founded on 6 November 1892. He died in Berlin.

Karl Moritz Schumann participated as a collaborator in Die Natürlichen Pflanzenfamilien by Adolf Engler and K. A. E. Prantl and in Flora Brasiliensis by Carl Friedrich Philipp von Martius.

The genera Schumannianthus (Gagnepain), Schumanniophyton (Harms), Schumannia (Kuntze) and several species were named after him, including:

- Abelia schumannii
- Cycas schumanniana
- Cyperus karlschumannii
- Mammillaria schumannii
- Notocactus schumannianus
- Pavetta schumanniana
- Psychotria schumanniana
- Rubia schumanniana
- Vangueria schumanniana

== Bibliography ==
- Schumann, K. M., "Gesamtbeschreibung der Kakteen" (Complete description of cacti), 1898.
- Schumann, K. M., et al., "Kakteen (Iconographia Cactacearum) im Auftrage der Deutschen Kakteen-Gesellschaft", 1900–1921.
- Schumann, K. M., "Praktikum für morphologische und systematische Botanik", 1904.
