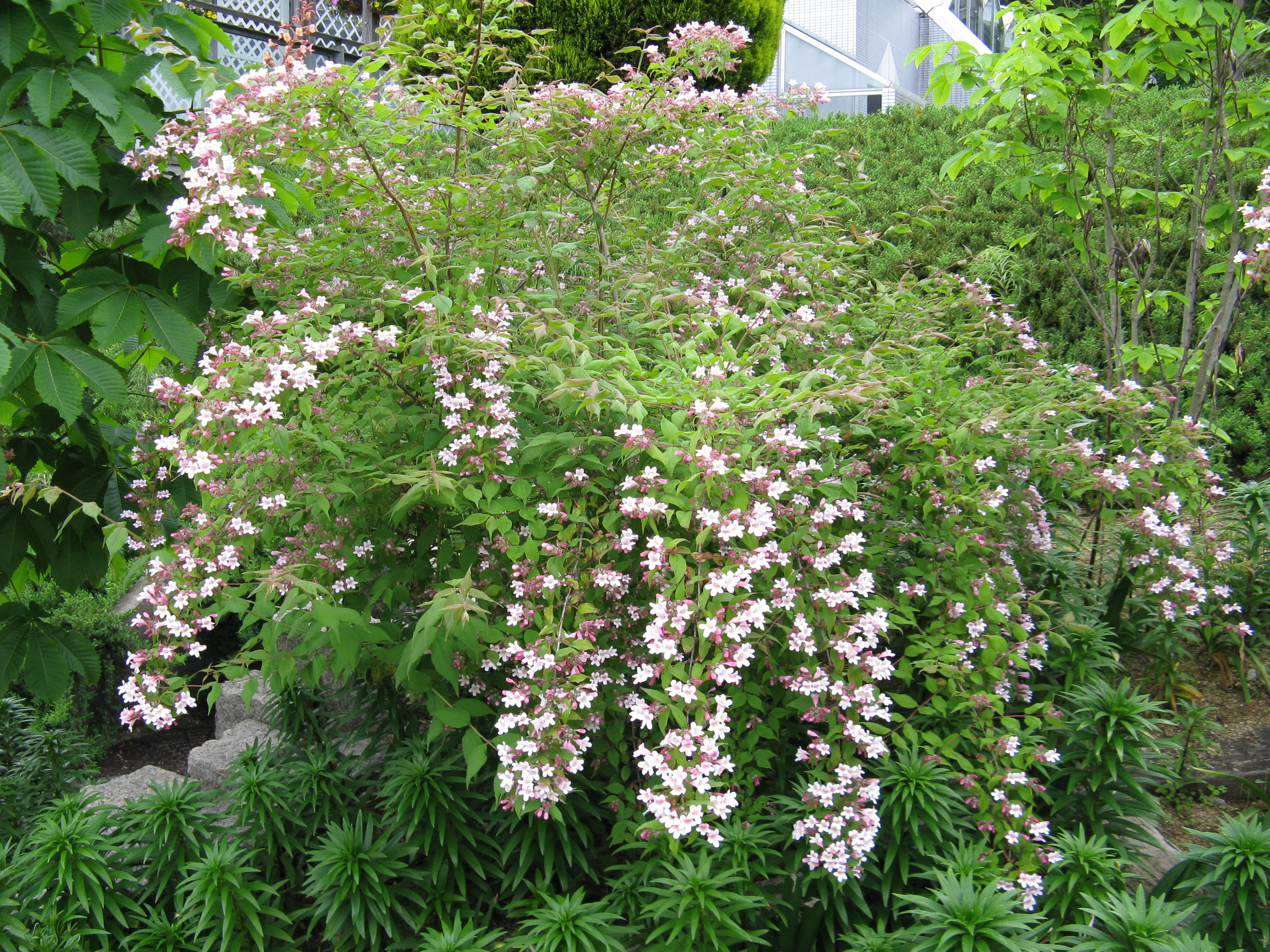

Scientific classification
- Kingdom: Plantae
- Clade: Embryophytes
- Clade: Tracheophytes
- Clade: Spermatophytes
- Clade: Angiosperms
- Clade: Eudicots
- Clade: Asterids
- Order: Dipsacales
- Family: Caprifoliaceae
- Subfamily: Linnaeoideae
- Genus: Kolkwitzia; Graebn. (1901)
- Species: K. amabilis

Binomial name
- Kolkwitzia amabilis Graebn. (1901)

Synonyms
- Kolkwitzia amabilis var. tomentosa Pamp. (1910); Linnaea amabilis (Graebn.) Christenh. (2013)

= Kolkwitzia =

Beauty bush

Species of flowering plant in the honeysuckle family

Kolkwitzia amabilis /kɒlˈkwɪtsiə əˈmæbɪlɪs/, commonly known as beauty bush, is a species of flowering plant in the family Caprifoliaceae. It is the sole species in genus Kolkwitzia. It is a deciduous shrub grown as an ornamental plant. In China, where it originated, the plant is called wèi shí shù (蝟实树).

== Description ==
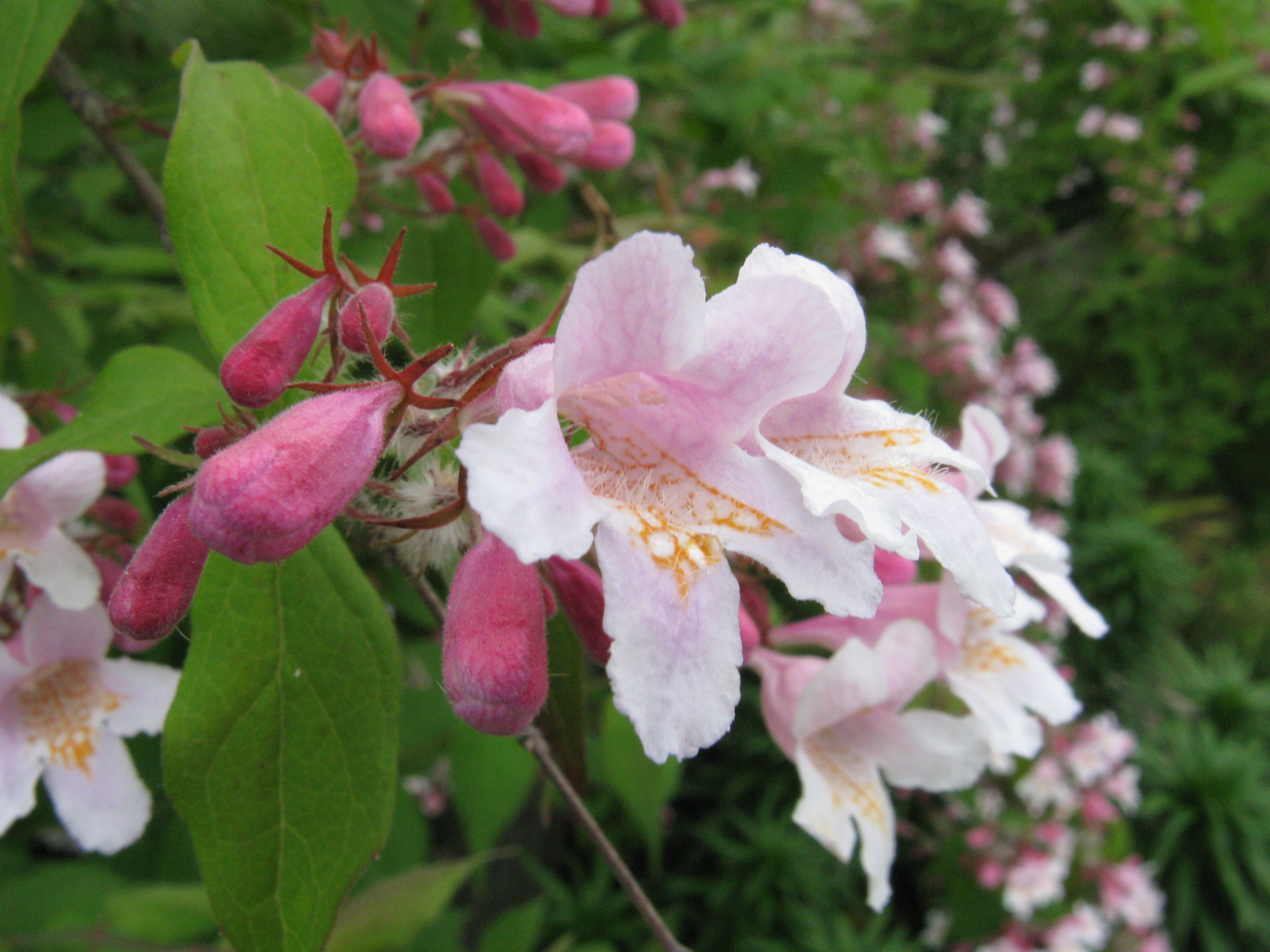
Flower

The plant is an arching, spreading shrub, with light brown flaky bark and graceful arching branches, which can grow higher than 8 ft (2.4 m) tall. It is usually as wide as it is tall. The plant blooms in late spring. Its light pink flowers, dark pink in the bud, are about one-inch long and bell-shaped ("tubular campanulate"); they grow in pairs, as with all Caprifoliaceae, and form showy, numerous sprays along ripened wood. Its leaves are opposite, simple, and ovate, from 0.5 to 3 in (1.3 to 7.6 cm) long, entire or with a few sparse shallow teeth. Its fruit is a hairy, ovoid capsule approximately 0.25 in (0.6 cm) inches long.

== Taxonomy ==
The species was first described by Paul Graebner and placed in the new genus Kolkwitzia, whose name honours Richard Kolkwitz, a professor of botany in Berlin. The specific epithet amabilis means "lovely".

== History ==
The beauty bush originates in Central China, where it has been discovered for western science twice; once by the Jesuit missionary Giuseppe Giraldi in Shaanxi, and then in western Hubei province by the British explorer and plant collector E.H. Wilson. Wilson sent plant material to his sponsors Veitch Nurseries in Exeter in 1901, where the shrub flowered for the first time in 1910. The shrub became very popular in the eastern United States following World War I – almost a defining shrub in American gardens made between the World Wars. It is very rare and threatened in the wild.

== Cultivation ==
Numerous cultivars have been developed for garden use. The cultivar 'Pink Cloud' has gained the Royal Horticultural Society's Award of Garden Merit.

=== Pruning ===
Opinions differ concerning how much pruning the shrub needs. The University of Missouri Horticulture Department suggests minimal intervention, so long as the plant has enough room to develop, up to a maximum height of 15 ft (4.6 m) and a potential "spread" of 8 ft (2.4 m). Others suggest more active intervention to encourage development of new flowering branches and buds, with decisive pruning immediately after flowering.
