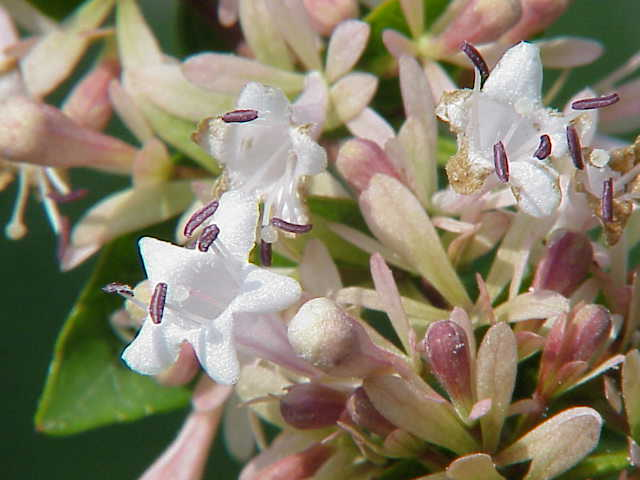

Scientific classification
- Kingdom: Plantae
- Clade: Embryophytes
- Clade: Tracheophytes
- Clade: Spermatophytes
- Clade: Angiosperms
- Clade: Eudicots
- Clade: Asterids
- Order: Dipsacales
- Family: Caprifoliaceae
- Genus: Abelia
- Species: A. chinensis

Binomial name
- Abelia chinensis R.Br.

Varieties
- Abelia chinensis var. aschersoniana (Graebn.) Landrein; Abelia chinensis var. chinensis; Abelia chinensis var. hanceana (Mart. ex Hance) Landrein; Abelia chinensis var. ionandra (Hayata) Masam.; Abelia chinensis var. lipoensis (M.T.An & G.Q.Gou) Landrein

Synonyms
- Linnaea chinensis (R.Br.) A.Braun & Vatke

= Abelia chinensis =

Species of flowering plant

Abelia chinensis, commonly known as Chinese abelia, is a species of flowering plant in the honeysuckle family Caprifoliaceae. It is a semi-evergreen, densely branched shrub with dark green foliage.

The species was described by Robert Brown in 1818.

== Description ==
It is a compact deciduous shrub with reddish stems and glossy, small leaves that become reddish-brown before autumn. Its simplified-form flowers are funnel-shaped, white, and its pink sepals remain long after flowering. As long as the plant continues to make new growth during the summer, it will continue to flower. It is one of the most cold-resistant species within the genus.

== Distribution and habitat ==
The plant is found in south-central China and south-eastern China, as well as Taiwan, Vietnam, and the Ryukyu Islands.

== Varieties ==
Five varieties are accepted.

- Abelia chinensis var. aschersoniana (Graebn.) Landrein (synonym Abelia aschersoniana (Graebn.) Rehder) – Lantau Island, Hong Kong
- Abelia chinensis var. chinensis (synonyms Abelia cavaleriei H.Lév. and Abelia rupestris Lindl.) – southern China, Taiwan, and Vietnam
- Abelia chinensis var. hanceana (Mart. ex Hance) Landrein (synonym Abelia hanceana Mart. ex Hance) – southeastern China
- Abelia chinensis var. ionandra (Hayata) Masam. (synonym Abelia ionandra Hayata) – Ryukyu Islands and Taiwan
- Abelia chinensis var. lipoensis (M.T.An & G.Q.Gou) Landrein (synonym Abelia lipoensis M.T.An & G.Q.Gou) – southern China

== Cultivation ==
Abelia chinensis is widely cultivated as an ornamental garden plant. The cultivar 'China Rose' has gained the Royal Horticultural Society's Award of Garden Merit.
