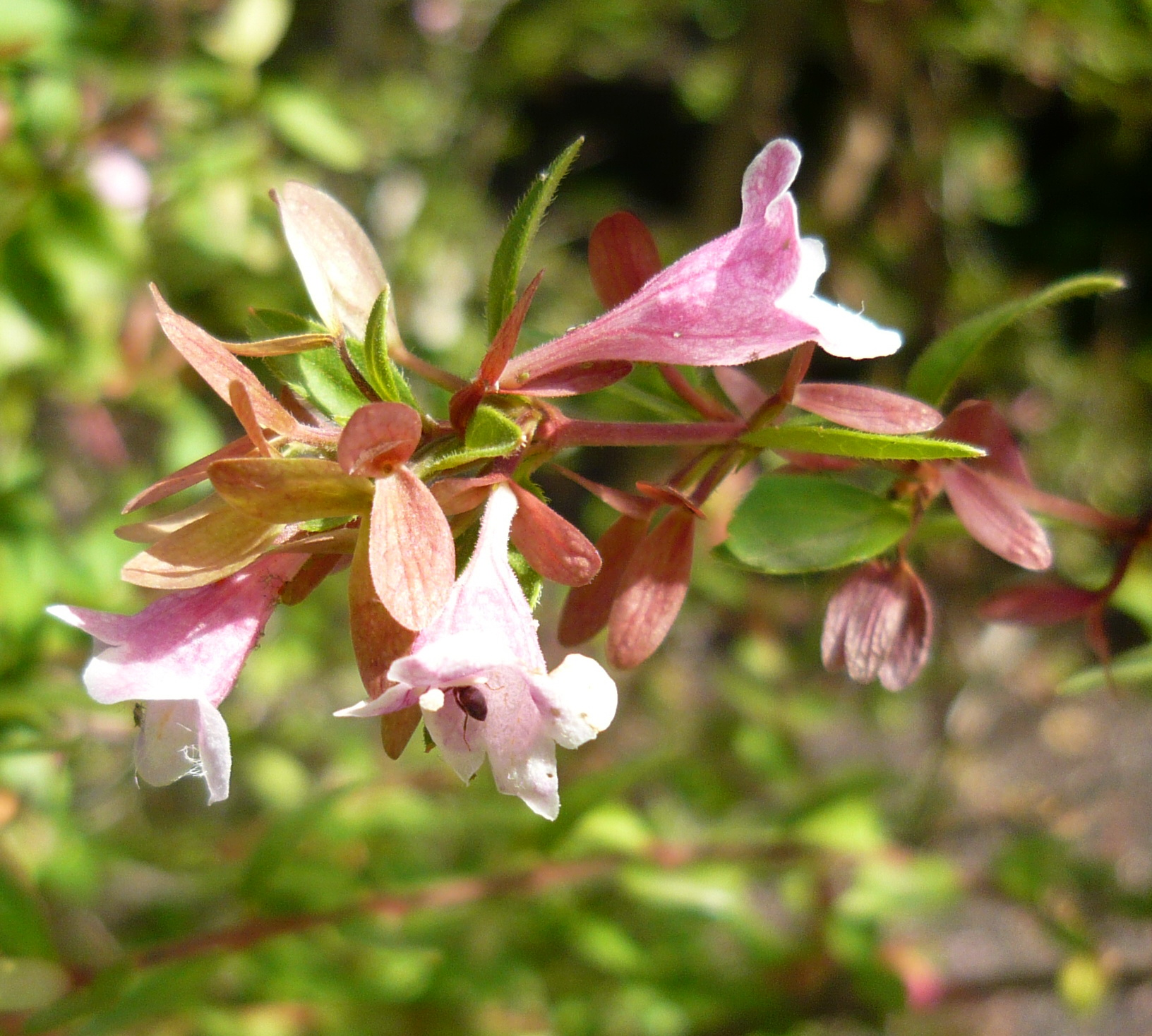
- In the Real Jardín Botánico de Madrid

Scientific classification
- Kingdom: Plantae
- Clade: Embryophytes
- Clade: Tracheophytes
- Clade: Angiosperms
- Clade: Eudicots
- Clade: Asterids
- Order: Dipsacales
- Family: Caprifoliaceae
- Genus: Abelia
- Species: A. schumannii

Binomial name
- Abelia schumannii (Graebn.) Rehder (1911)

Synonyms
- Abelia tereticalyx (Graebn. & Buchw.) Rehder (1911); Linnaea schumannii Graebn. (1900); Abelia tereticalyx Graebn. & Buchw. (1900)

= Abelia schumannii =

Species of flowering plant in the honeysuckle family

Abelia schumannii is a species of flowering plant in the family Caprifoliaceae. It is native to central China, where it ranges from southern Gansu to northern Yunnan provinces. It is a semi-evergreen shrub growing to 2 m (7 ft) tall by 3 m (10 ft) broad. Pink flowers with red calyces are produced in late summer and autumn.

In cultivation it requires a sheltered, south-facing aspect. It is valued as a late-flowering ornamental garden shrub.
