= Ogren Plant Allergy Scale =

Allergy rating system

- Purpose: measures plant potential to cause allergic reaction

The Ogren Plant Allergy Scale (OPALS) is an allergy rating system for plants that measures the potential of a plant to cause allergic reactions in humans.

== Scale system ==
The OPALS allergy scale was first published in Allergy-Free Gardening, by Thomas Leo Ogren, in 2000. It covers over 3,000 common trees, shrubs, flowers, and grasses. The allergy scale was updated and extended in 2015 in The Allergy-Fighting Garden.

The Ogren Plant Allergy Scale takes into account pollen allergies, contact allergies, and odor allergies, with higher weighting given to pollen allergies that are caused by inhaling pollen into the lungs. Additionally, plants that cause contact allergies (such as rashes or itching), or that are highly poisonous when ingested even though their pollen does not cause respiratory allergies, are never given low ratings.

Low allergy ratings are considered to be 1 through 3 on the allergy scale. Mid-range ratings are 4 through 6, and high ratings are 7 through 10. Plants with ratings of 9 or 10 have an extremely high potential to cause allergic reactions.

OPALS Rating	Guideline	Examples
1–3	Very low potential to cause allergic reactions	Strelitzia; Female Juniper; Agapanthus
4–6	Moderate potential to cause allergic reactions, exacerbated by over-use of the same plant throughout a garden	Celery; Phaseolus; Abelia
7–8	High potential to cause allergic reactions, advise to plant as little as possible	Field Maple; Japanese Boxwood
9–10	Extremely high potential to cause allergic reactions, should be replaced with less allergenic species	Cupressus; Male Juniper; Olive

== Application ==
- Canada: The OPALS allergy scale was used in the Canadian Urban Allergy Audit, which was conducted in 2012.
- United Kingdom: OPALS allergy scale labels for plants sold at nurseries have recently become available for use within the United Kingdom.
- United States: OPALS has been adopted for use by the American Lung Association and the U.S. Department of Agriculture Urban and Community Forest Service. More recently, the California Public Health Department has endorsed the use of this allergy scale in city landscape planning to reduce asthma.
- Germany: OPALS along with the Urban Green Zone Allergenicity Index (IUGZA) were studied in a pilot area of Augsburg, Southern Germany to increase greenspaces to that aid air pollution, reduce urban heat, support biodiversity and manage stormwater quality while also lowering allergic exposure through analysis of plant species for allergenic potential.
