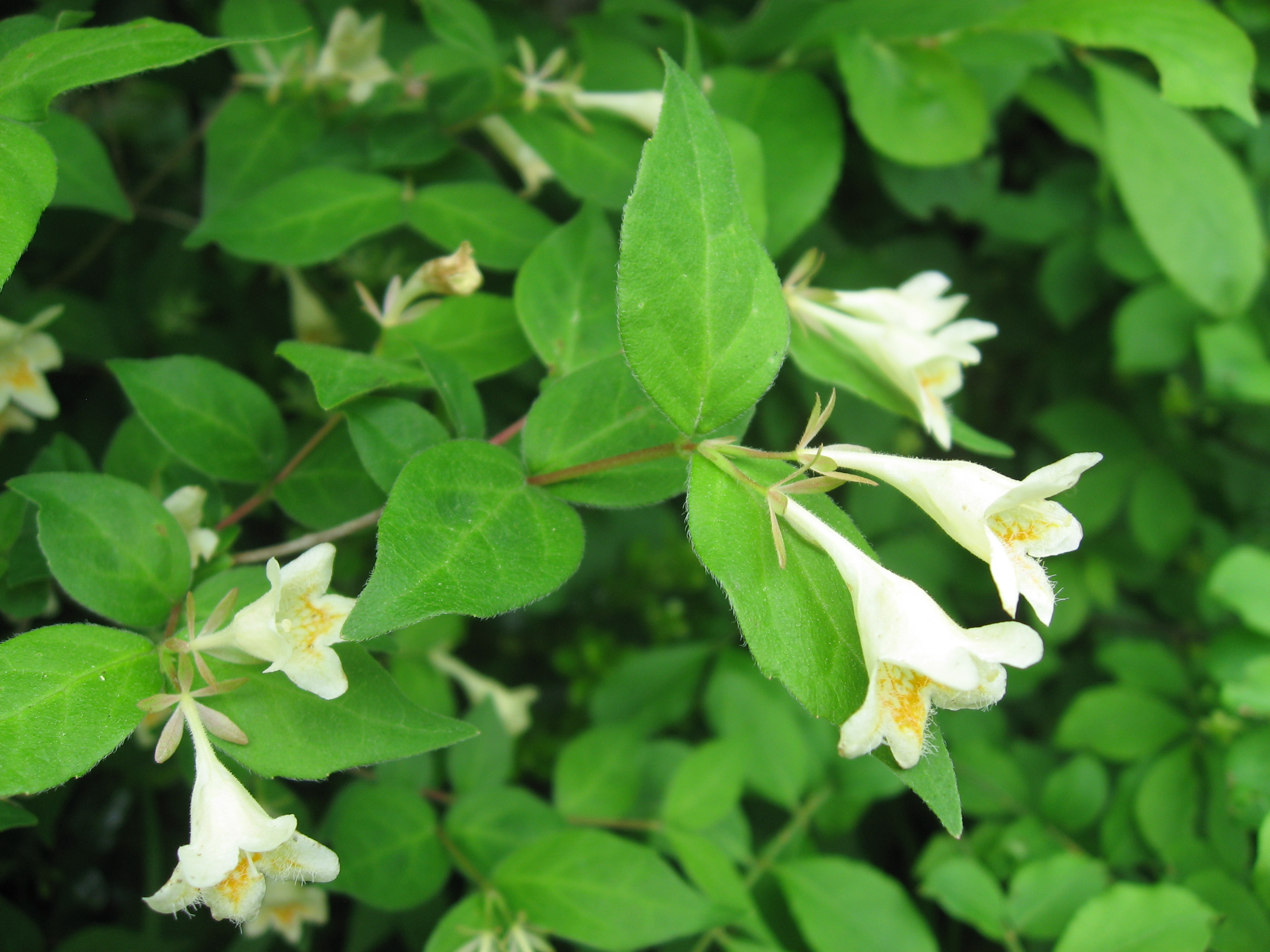

Scientific classification
- Kingdom: Plantae
- Clade: Embryophytes
- Clade: Tracheophytes
- Clade: Spermatophytes
- Clade: Angiosperms
- Clade: Eudicots
- Clade: Asterids
- Order: Dipsacales
- Family: Caprifoliaceae
- Genus: Diabelia
- Species: D. spathulata

Binomial name
- Diabelia spathulata (Siebold & Zucc.) Landrein (2010)

Varieties
- Diabelia spathulata var. colorata (H.Hara & S.Kuros.) Landrein; Diabelia spathulata var. miyagii Landrein; Diabelia spathulata var. spathulata

Synonyms
- Abelia spathulata Siebold & Zucc. (1839); Linnaea spathulata (Siebold & Zucc.) Graebn. (1900)

= Diabelia spathulata =

Species of flowering plant in the honeysuckle family

Diabelia spathulata, synonym Abelia spathulata, is a species of flowering plant in the honeysuckle family (Caprifoliaceae). It is a shrub native to southern Korea and central and southern Japan.

Three varieties are accepted.

- Diabelia spathulata var. colorata (H.Hara & S.Kuros.) Landrein – Japan (Honshu)
- Diabelia spathulata var. miyagii Landrein – Japan (Honshu)
- Diabelia spathulata var. spathulata – southern Korea and central and southern Japan
