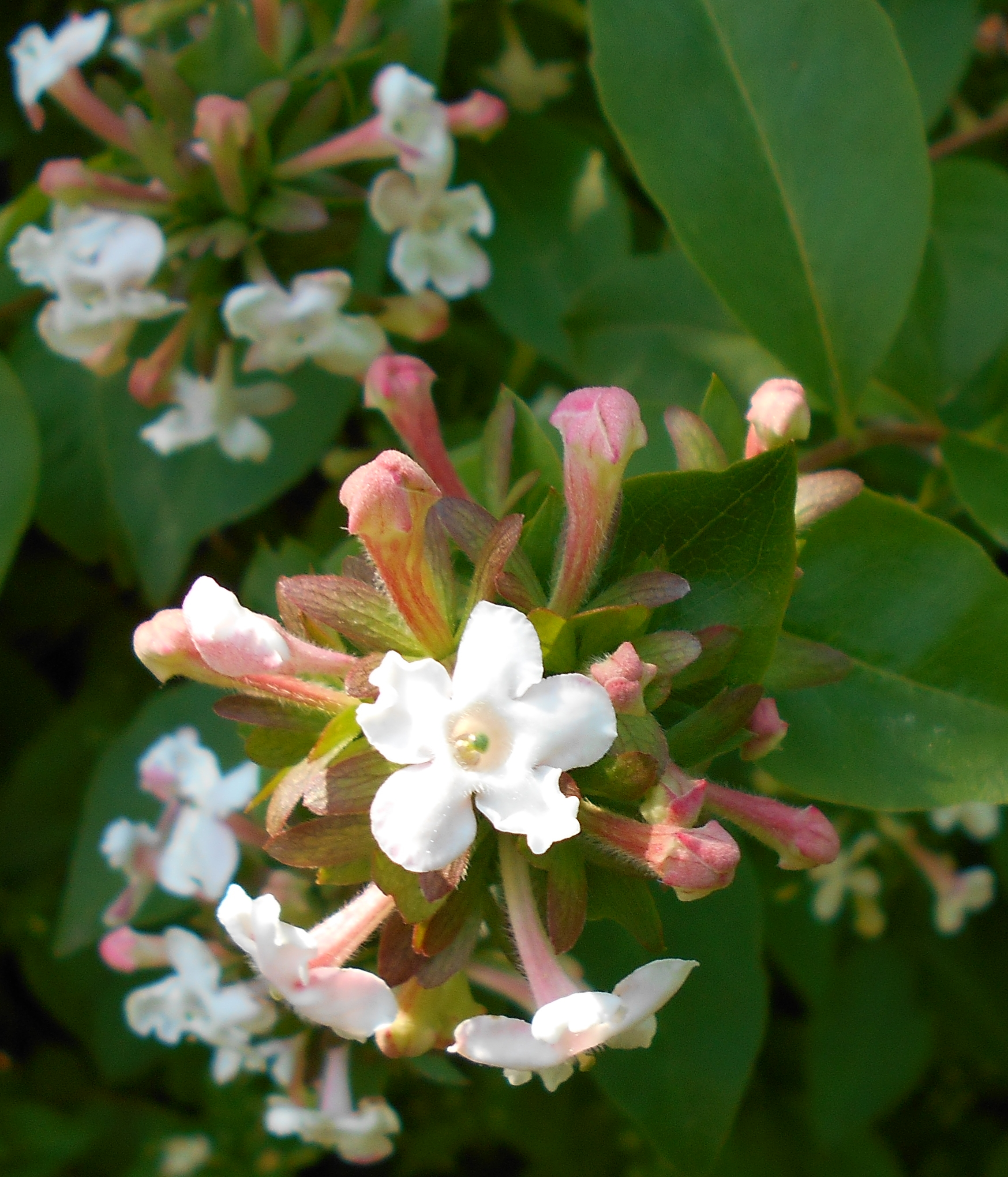

Scientific classification
- Kingdom: Plantae
- Clade: Tracheophytes
- Clade: Angiosperms
- Clade: Eudicots
- Clade: Asterids
- Order: Dipsacales
- Family: Caprifoliaceae
- Genus: Zabelia
- Species: Z. tyaihyoni

Binomial name
- Zabelia tyaihyoni (Nakai) Hisauti & H.Hara

Synonyms
- Abelia mosanensis T.H.Chung ex Nakai; Abelia tyaihyonii Nakai; Zabelia mosanensis (T.H.Chung ex Nakai) Hisauti & H.Hara

= Zabelia tyaihyoni =

Species of shrub

Zabelia tyaihyoni, synonym Abelia mosanensis, the fragrant abelia, is a species of deciduous shrub in the honeysuckle family Caprifoliaceae. Growing up to 2 meters high and wide, it is hardier than many related species, surviving temperatures as low as −20 °C (−4 °F). The tubular blooms are pinkish-white and highly scented, appearing in late Spring. The glossy green leaves turn red in autumn before falling.

Zabelia tyaihyoni is a popular garden shrub. The cultivar 'Korean Spring' (under the name Abelia mosanensis) has gained the Royal Horticultural Society's Award of Garden Merit.
