= Diabelia =

Scientific classification
- Kingdom: Plantae
- Clade: Tracheophytes
- Clade: Angiosperms
- Clade: Eudicots
- Clade: Asterids
- Order: Dipsacales
- Family: Caprifoliaceae
- Subfamily: Linnaeoideae
- Genus: Diabelia; Landrein (2010)

Species
- 4; see text

Genus of flowering plants

Diabelia is a genus of flowering plants in the family Caprifoliaceae. It includes four species native to east Asia, including Japan, Korea, and southeastern China.

== Species ==
Four species are accepted.

- Diabelia ionostachya (Nakai) Landrein & R.L.Barrett
- Diabelia sanguinea (Makino) Landrein
- Diabelia serrata (Siebold & Zucc.) Landrein
- Diabelia spathulata (Siebold & Zucc.) Landrein
