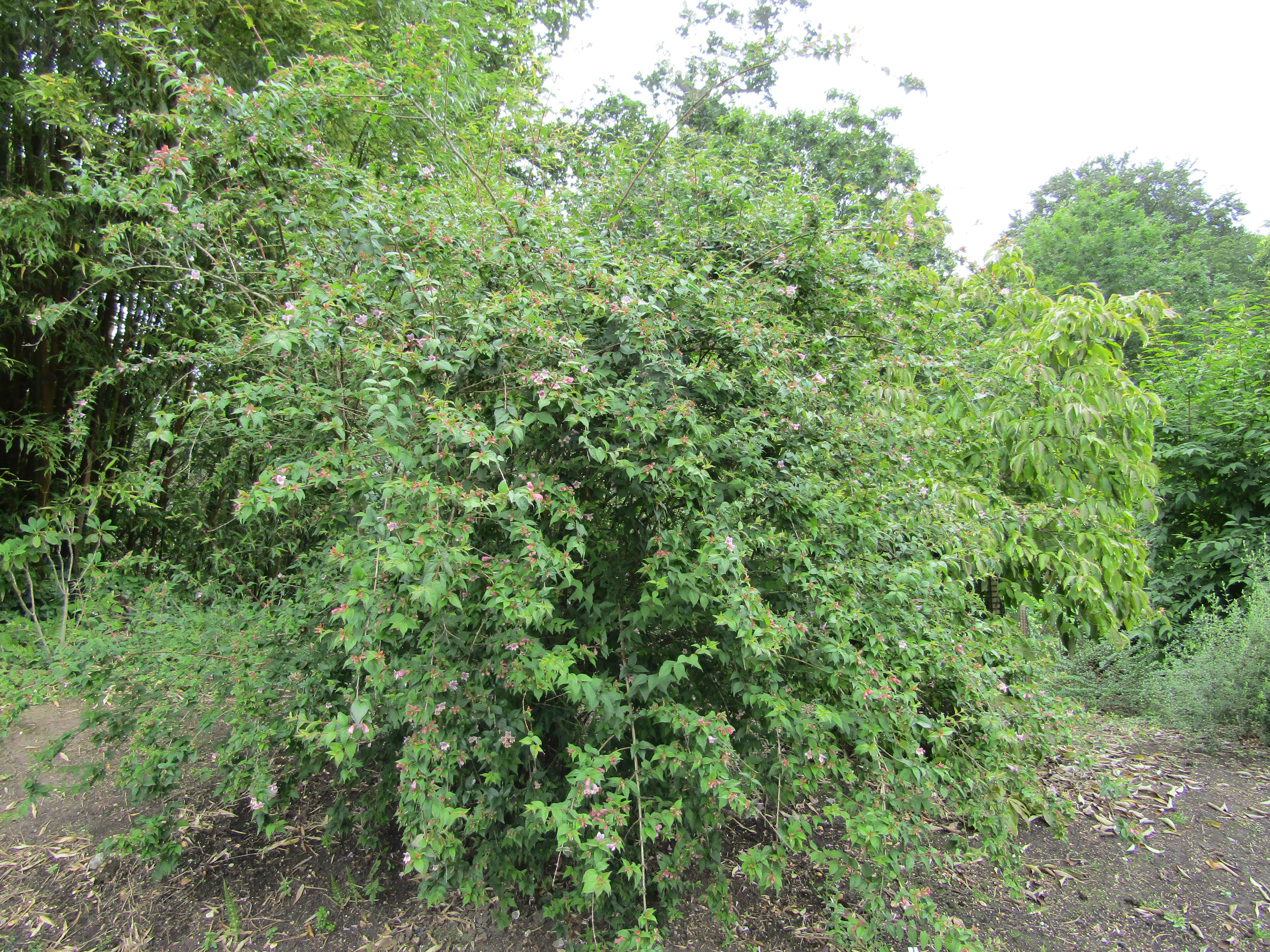

Scientific classification
- Kingdom: Plantae
- Clade: Tracheophytes
- Clade: Angiosperms
- Clade: Eudicots
- Clade: Asterids
- Order: Dipsacales
- Family: Caprifoliaceae
- Genus: Abelia
- Species: A. parvifolia

Binomial name
- Abelia parvifolia Hemsl. (1888)

Synonyms
- Abelia macrotera var. parvifolia (Hemsl.) Landrein (2019), nom. superfl.; Linnaea parvifolia (Hemsl.) Graebn. (1900)

= Abelia parvifolia =

Species of plant

Abelia parvifolia is a species of flowering plant in the honeysuckle family, Caprifoliaceae. It is a shrub native to Hubei Province in central China.
