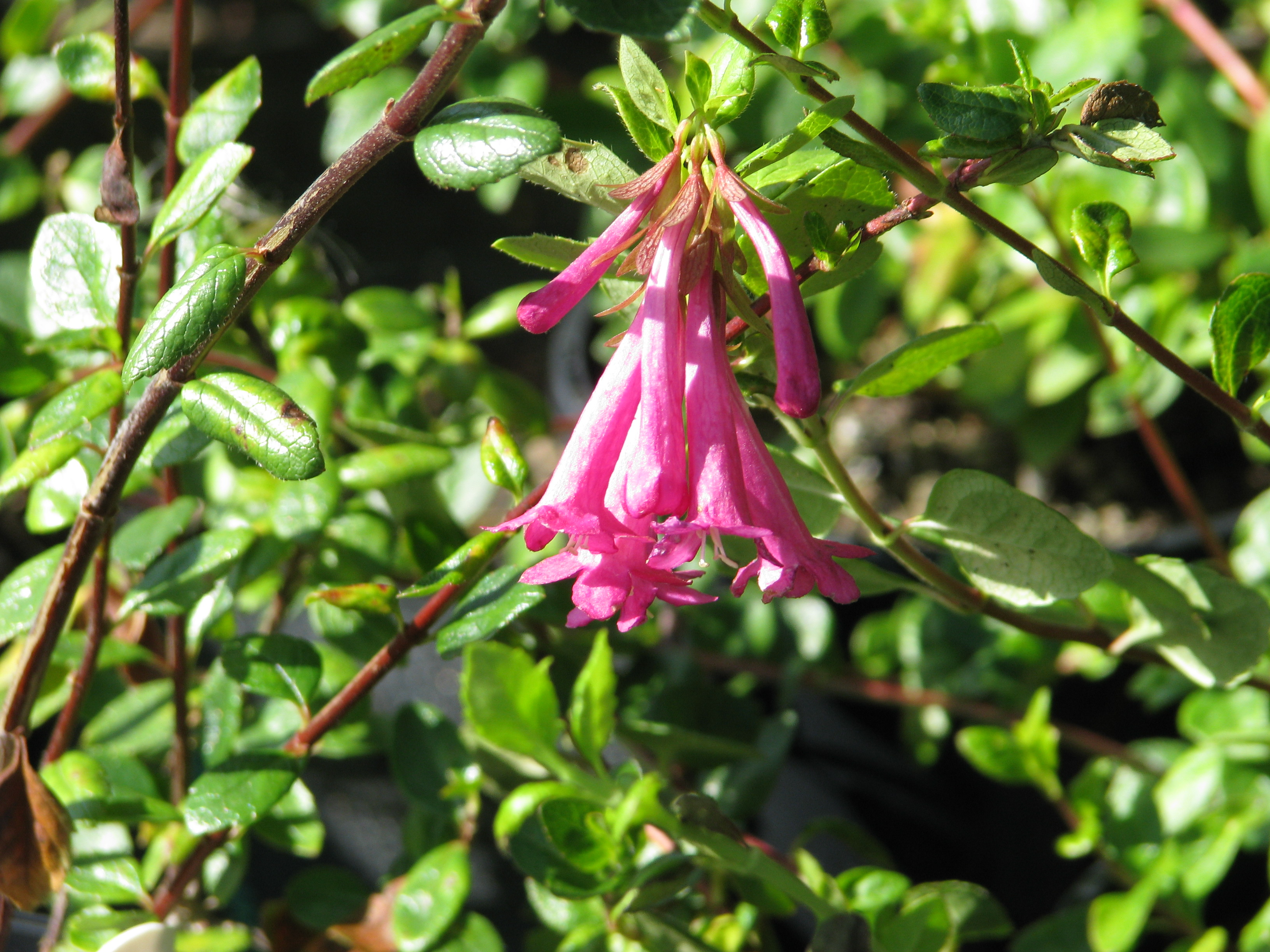

Scientific classification
- Kingdom: Plantae
- Clade: Embryophytes
- Clade: Tracheophytes
- Clade: Spermatophytes
- Clade: Angiosperms
- Clade: Eudicots
- Clade: Asterids
- Order: Dipsacales
- Family: Caprifoliaceae
- Genus: Vesalea
- Species: V. floribunda

Binomial name
- Vesalea floribunda M.Martens & Galeotti (1844)

Varieties
- Vesalea floribunda var. floribunda; Vesalea floribunda var. foliacea (Villarreal) Landrein

Synonyms
- Abelia floribunda (M.Mart. & Galeotti) Decne. (1846); Linnaea floribunda (M.Mart. & Galeotti) A.Braun & Vatke (1872)

= Vesalea floribunda =

Species of flowering plant in the honeysuckle family

Vesalea floribunda, also known as Mexican abelia, is a species of flowering plant in the honeysuckle family, Caprifoliaceae. It is a shrub native to southern Mexico, ranging from central Veracruz to northern Oaxaca and southeastern Chiapas.

Growing to 4 m (13 ft) tall and broad, it is a semi-evergreen or evergreen shrub with shiny ovate leaves and clusters of tubular cerise flowers to 5 cm (2.0 in) long. The flowers bloom year-round (in the wild) except in the spring. It fruits (produces a seed pod) year-round (in the wild) except May and June.

Its natural habitat is mixed pine and oak forests and on rocky outcrops at 2,000 to 3,000 m (6,600 to 9,800 ft) elevation.

Two varieties are accepted.

- Vesalea floribunda var. floribunda (synonyms Abelia hirsuta (M.Martens & Galeotti) Walp. and Abelia speciosa Decne.) – central Veracruz to northern Oaxaca and southeastern Chiapas
- Vesalea floribunda var. foliacea (Villarreal) Landrein – southeastern Chiapas

Though hardy down to −10 °C (14 °F), it prefers a sheltered location, for instance against a south-facing stone wall.

It has gained the Royal Horticultural Society's Award of Garden Merit.

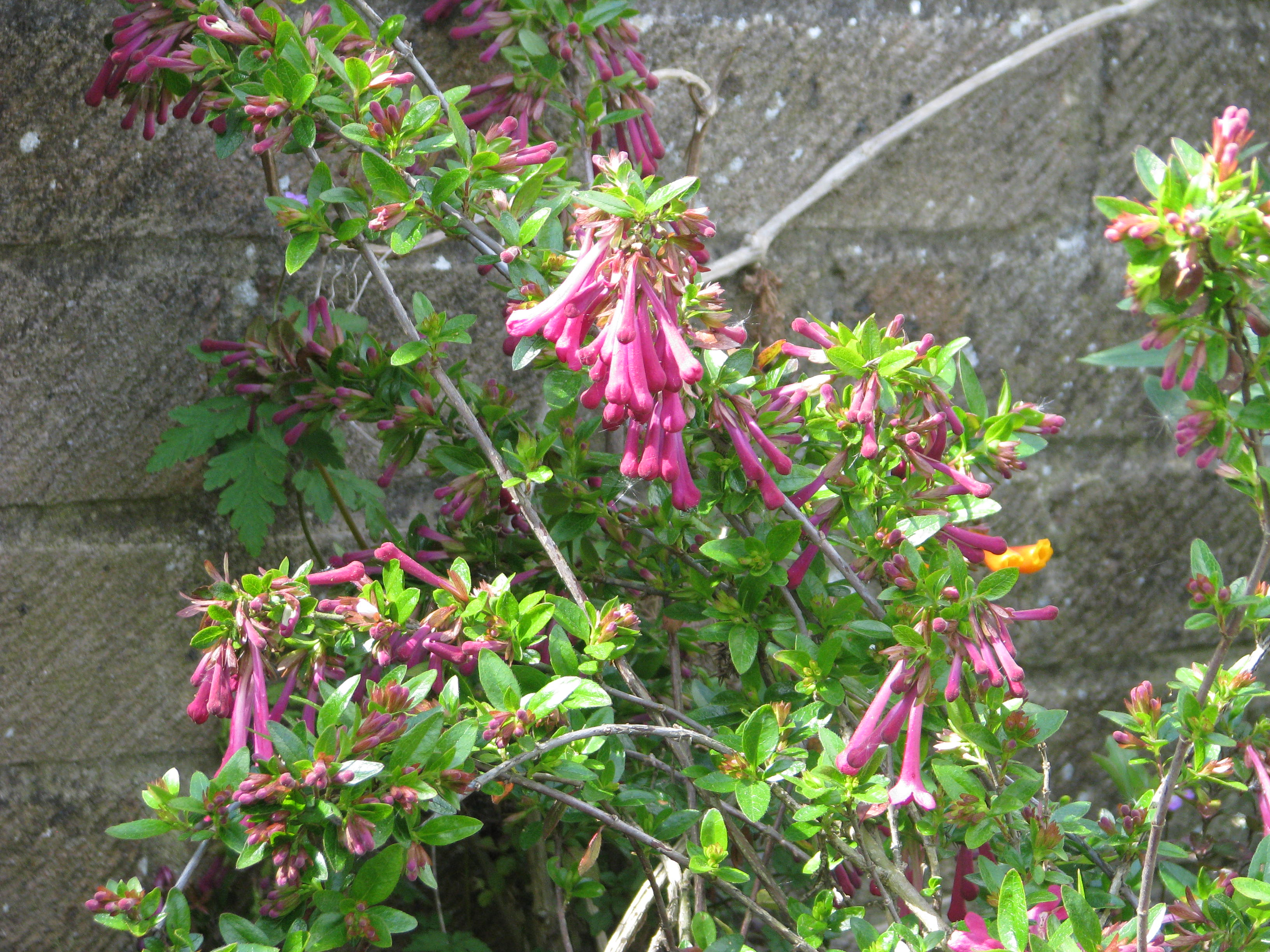

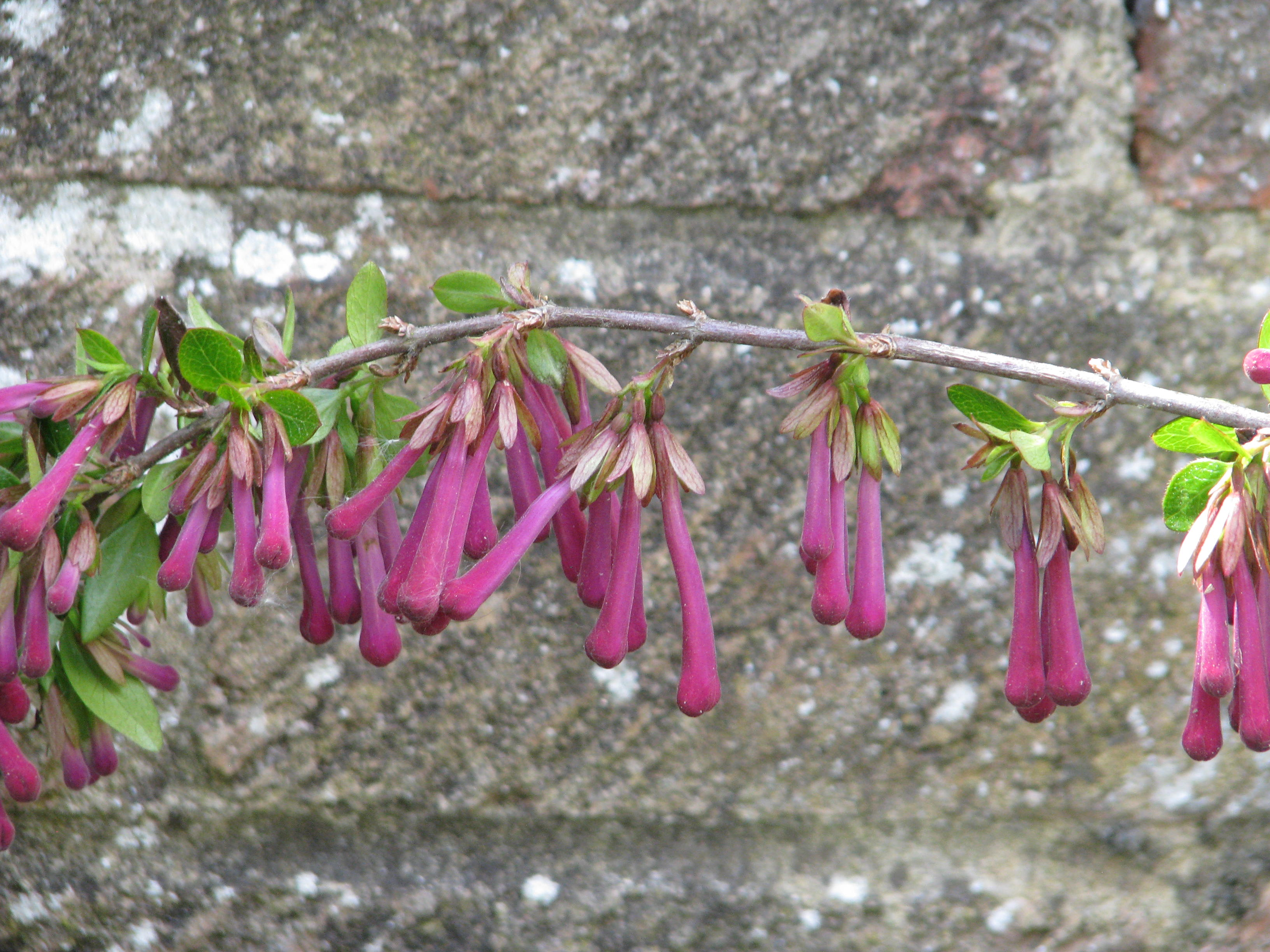
