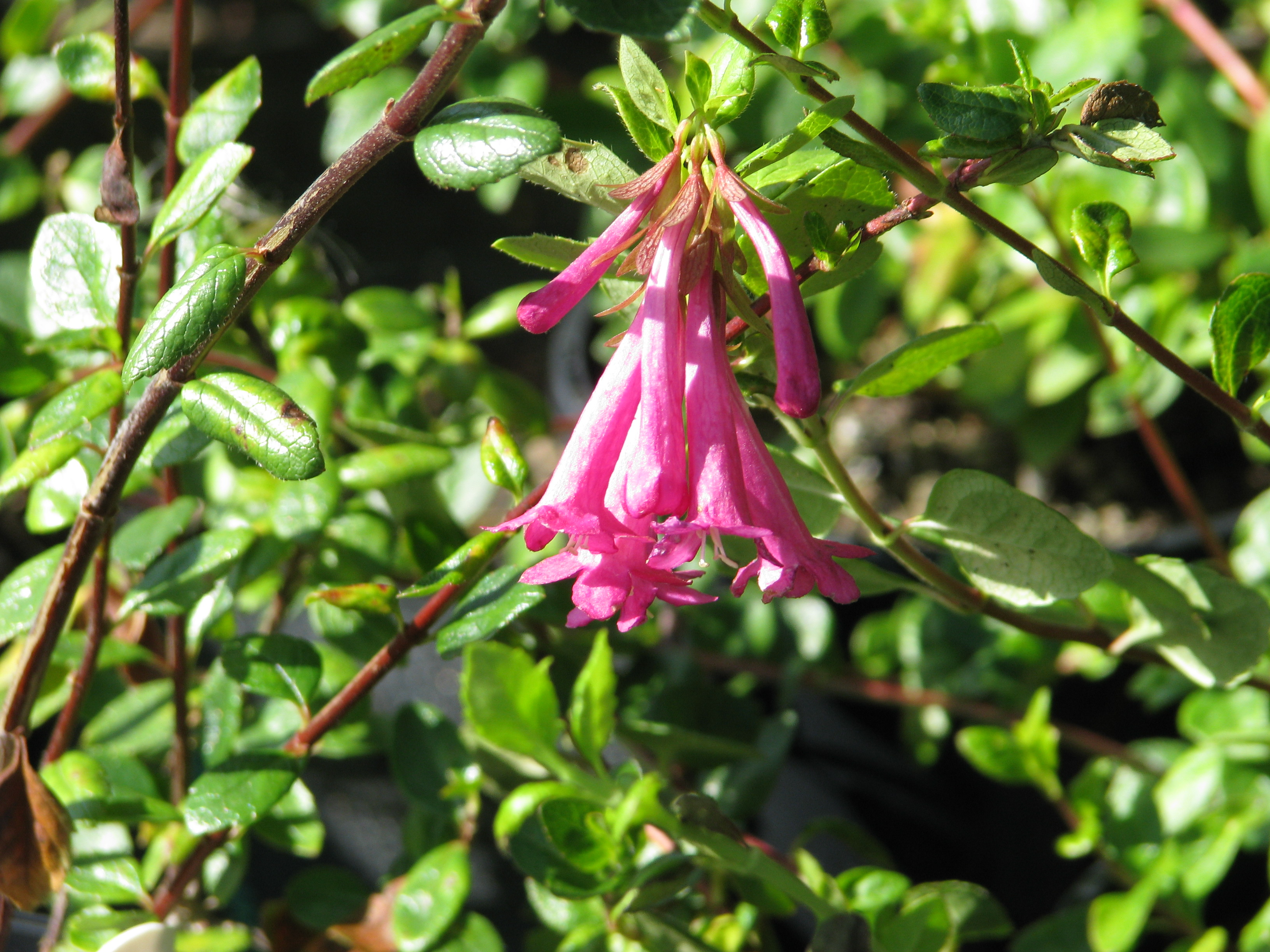
- Vesalea floribunda

Scientific classification
- Kingdom: Plantae
- Clade: Embryophytes
- Clade: Tracheophytes
- Clade: Spermatophytes
- Clade: Angiosperms
- Clade: Eudicots
- Clade: Asterids
- Order: Dipsacales
- Family: Caprifoliaceae
- Subfamily: Linnaeoideae
- Genus: Vesalea; M.Martens & Galeotti (1844)

Type species
- Vesalea floribunda

Species
- See text

= Vesalea =

Genus of flowering plants in the honeysuckle family

Vesalea is a plant genus in the honeysuckle family Caprifoliaceae. They are native to Mexico.

The genus was circumscribed by Martin Martens and Henri Guillaume Galeotti in Bull. Acad. Roy. Sci. Bruxelles vol.11 (1) on page 242 in 1844.

The genus name of Vesalea is in honour of Andreas Vesalius (1514–1564), who was a Belgian anatomist and physician. He was a professor at the University of Padua (1537–1542) and later became Imperial physician at the court of Emperor Charles V.

== Species ==
As accepted by Plants of the World Online (POWO);

- Vesalea coriacea (Hemsl.) T.Kim & B.Sun ex Landrein
- Vesalea floribunda M.Martens & Galeotti
- Vesalea grandifolia (Villarreal) Hua Feng Wang & Landrein
- Vesalea mexicana (Villarreal) Hua Feng Wang & Landrein
- Vesalea occidentalis (Villarreal) H.F.Wang & Landrein
- Vesalea subcoriacea (Villarreal) Landrein
