= Zabelia corymbosa =

Conservation status
- Least Concern (IUCN 3.1)

Scientific classification
- Kingdom: Plantae
- Clade: Tracheophytes
- Clade: Angiosperms
- Clade: Eudicots
- Clade: Asterids
- Order: Dipsacales
- Family: Caprifoliaceae
- Genus: Zabelia
- Species: Z. corymbosa

Binomial name
- Zabelia corymbosa (Regel & Schmalh.) Makino

Synonyms
- Abelia corymbosa Regel & Schmalh.; Linnaea corymbosa (Regel & Schmalh.) Graebn.

Species of flowering plant

Zabelia corymbosa (synonym Abelia corymbosa) is a species of flowering plant in the honeysuckle family, Caprifoliaceae. It is native to Central Asia, where it occurs in Kazakhstan, Kyrgyzstan, and Tajikistan.

This is a shrub growing up to 3 to 4 meters tall. The dull green, oval-shaped leaves vary in size. Tubular flowers grow in pairs in the leaf axils. The flowers are 1 to 2 centimeters long and are a pink-tinged white in color.

This species was described (as Abelia corymbosa) by Eduard August von Regel and Johannes Theodor Schmalhausen in 1878, and transferred to Zabelia by Tomitaro Makino in 1948.
