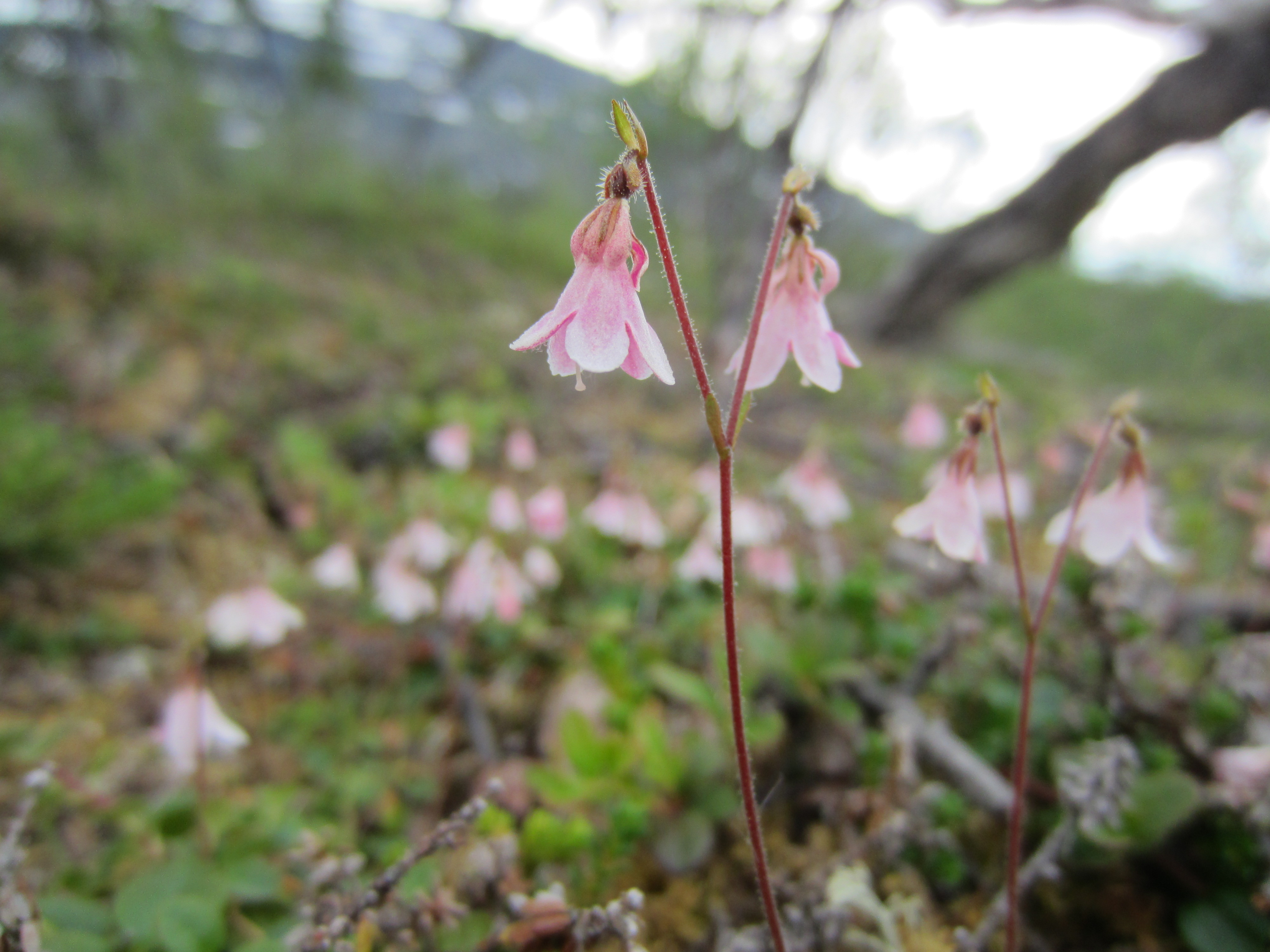
- Linnaea borealis subsp. borealis in flower, at Altevatn, Bardu, in Troms, Norway

Scientific classification
- Kingdom: Plantae
- Clade: Tracheophytes
- Clade: Angiosperms
- Clade: Eudicots
- Clade: Asterids
- Order: Dipsacales
- Family: Caprifoliaceae
- Subfamily: Linnaeoideae
- Genus: Linnaea; Gronov. ex L. (1753)
- Species: L. borealis

Binomial name
- Linnaea borealis L. (1753)

Varieties
- Linnaea borealis var. americana (J.Forbes) Rehder; Linnaea borealis var. borealis; Linnaea borealis var. longiflora Torr.

Synonyms
- List: Linnaea albiloba Brenner; Linnaea americana J.Forbes; Linnaea amoenula Wittr.; Linnaea amoenula var. pallida Brenner; Linnaea amoenula var. rubra Brenner; Linnaea australis Hoffmanns.; Linnaea borealis subsp. americana (J.Forbes) Hultén; Linnaea borealis subsp. longiflora (Torr.) Piper & Beattie; Linnaea borealis var. pallida Sern.; Linnaea borealis subf. pallida Brenner; Linnaea borealis var. pallida Sern.; Linnaea borealis subf. rubra Brenner; Linnaea borealis var. sulphurescens Jungner; Linnaea borealis var. sulphurescens Jungner; Linnaea foveolata Brenner; Linnaea jugosa Brenner; Linnaea longiflora Howell; Linnaea parvisignata Brenner; Linnaea pyrrosema Brenner; Linnaea roseoalba Brenner; Linnaea rotundata Brenner; Linnaea serpyllifolia Rupr.; Linnaea serpyllifolia Rydb.; Linnaea subconfluens Brenner; Linnaea subjugosa Brenner; Linnaea subsulcata Brenner; Linnaea subviolascens Brenner; Linnaea sulcata Brenner; Linnaea tenuiflora Brenner; Linnaea tenuisignata Brenner; Linnaea tenuisulcata Brenner; Linnaea vicina Wittr.; Obolaria borealis (L.) Kuntze

= Linnaea =

Circumpolar species of flowering plant

Linnaea borealis is a species of flowering plant in the family Caprifoliaceae (the honeysuckle family). It is the only species in the genus Linnaea. It is a boreal to subarctic woodland subshrub, commonly known as twinflower (sometimes written twin flower).

This plant was a favourite of Carl Linnaeus, founder of the modern system of binomial nomenclature, after whom the genus was named. He used it as his personal symbol.

== Description ==
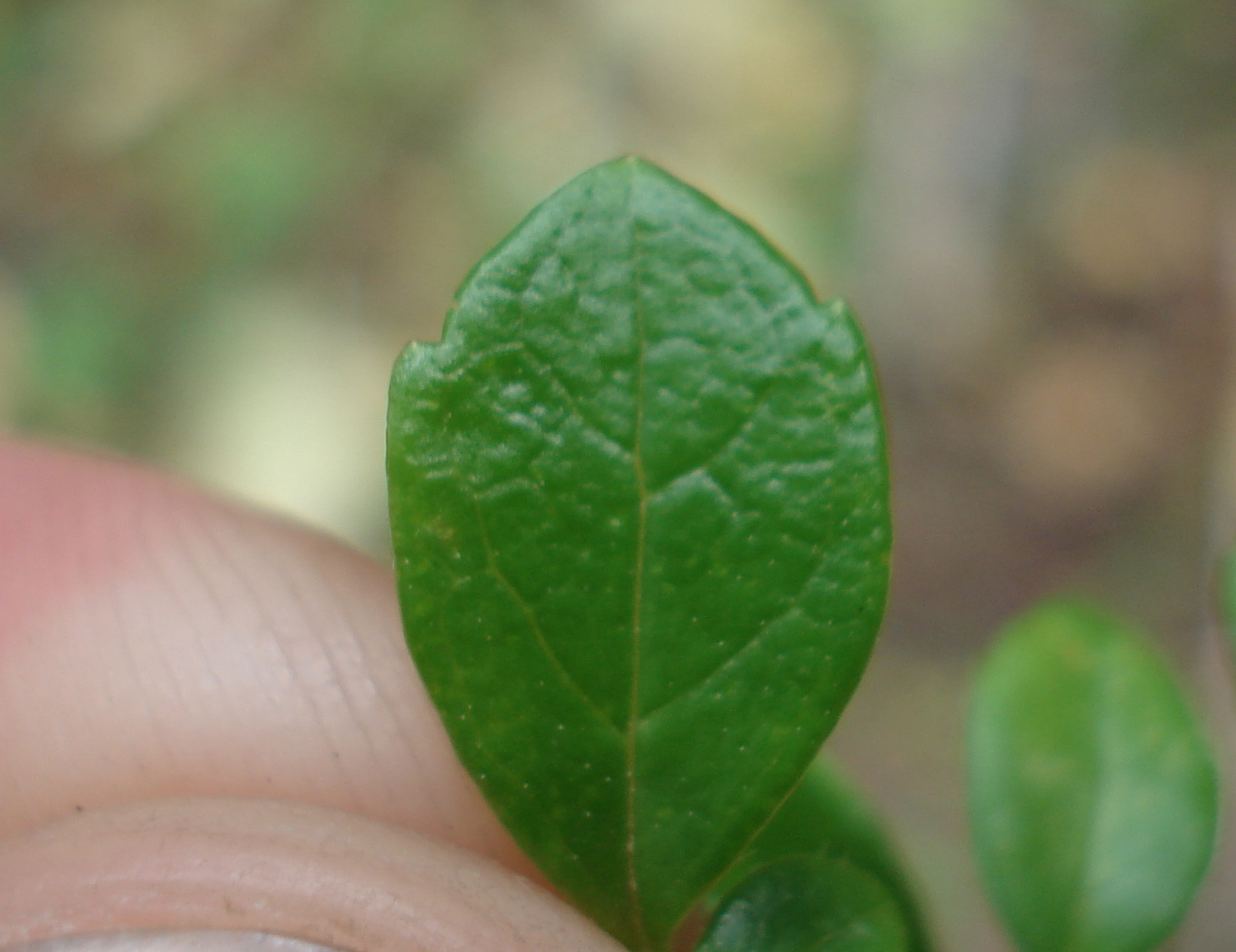
The leaves are under 1 cm long, with a few shallow teeth on the upper half.

The perennial stems of Linnaea borealis are slender, pubescent, and prostrate, growing to 20–40 centimetres (8–15 1/2 inches) long, with opposite evergreen rounded oval leaves 3–10 millimetres (1/8–3/8 in) long and 2–7 mm (1/16–1/4 in) broad. The flowering stems curve erect, to 4–8 cm (1 1/2–3 1/4 in) tall, and are leafless except at the base. The flowers are paired, pendulous, 7–12 mm (1/4–1/2 in) long, with a five-lobed, pale pink corolla.

L. borealis is self-incompatible, requiring cross-pollination to produce viable seeds; since pollen dispersal is usually not far, individuals and clonal colonies can become reproductively isolated. Regardless of seed production, Linnaea plants in a particular area often spread by stolons to form clonal patches of the same genotype.

== Taxonomy ==
Linnaea borealis was first formally described by Carl Linnaeus in 1753 in Species Plantarum. It was the sole species in the genus Linnaea. The genus name had been used earlier by the Dutch botanist Jan Frederik Gronovius, and was given in honour of Linnaeus. Linnaeus adopted the name because Linnaea borealis was his favourite plant.

Linnaea borealis is considered to be a single circumboreal species, with three generally recognized subspecies:

- Linnaea borealis subsp. borealis - Europe
- Linnaea borealis subsp. americana - North America (formerly classified as the species Linnaea americana)
- Linnaea borealis subsp. longiflora - Asia, and western North America (from Alaska to California)

The English name "twinflower" for Linnaea borealis refers to the plant's paired flowers.

In 2013 Christenhusz et al. concluded that the genus Abelia, as then circumscribed, was polyphyletic, and proposed merging Abelia and several other genera in tribe Linnaeeae into Linnaea. Wang, Landrein, et al. proposed reorganizing the tribe into several new and existing genera, and keeping Linnaea a monotypic genus. The circumscription proposed by Wang, Landrein, et al. is currently accepted by Plants of the World Online.

== Distribution and habitat ==
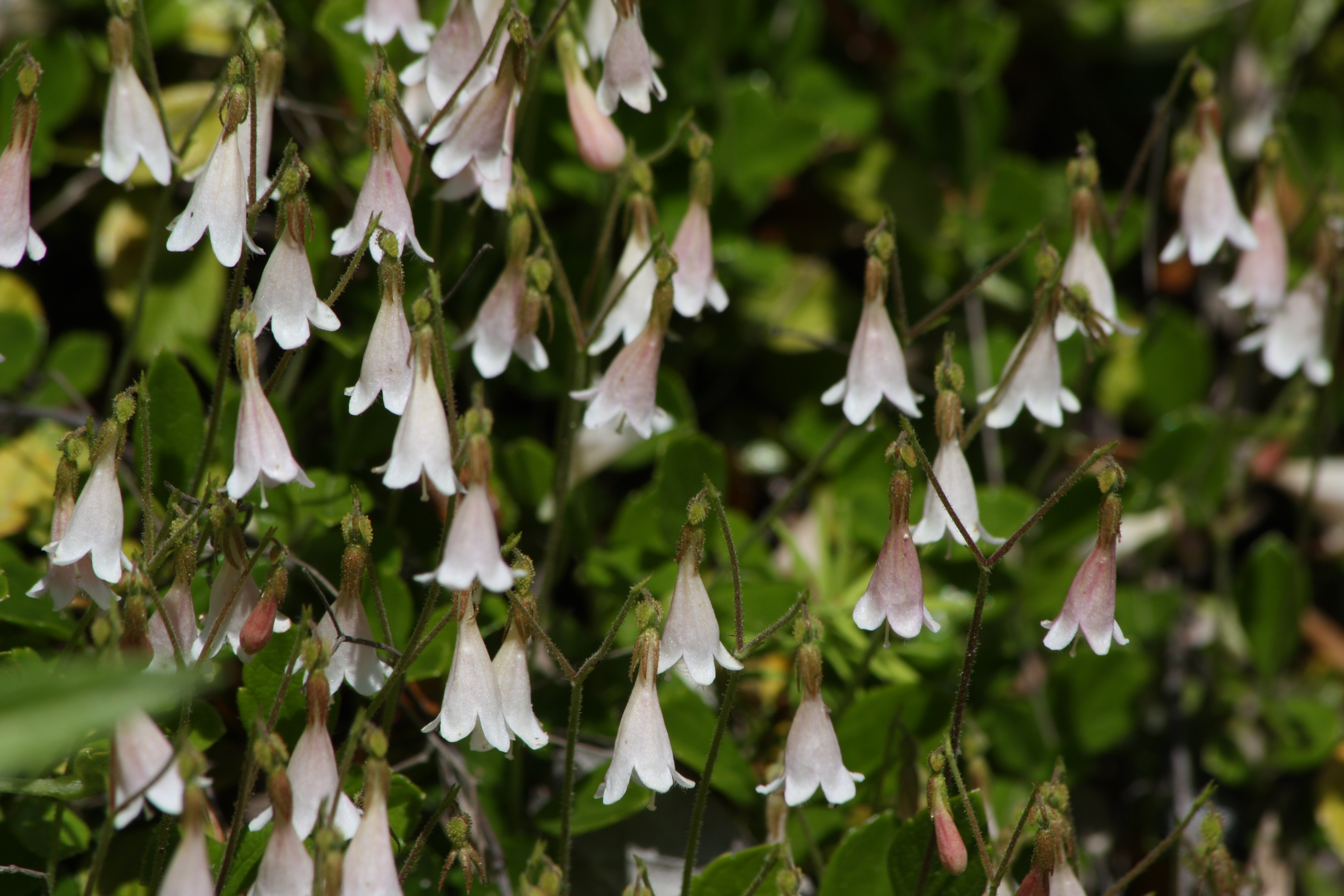
Linnaea borealis ssp. longiflora in the Mount Baker-Snoqualmie National Forest, Washington, U.S.

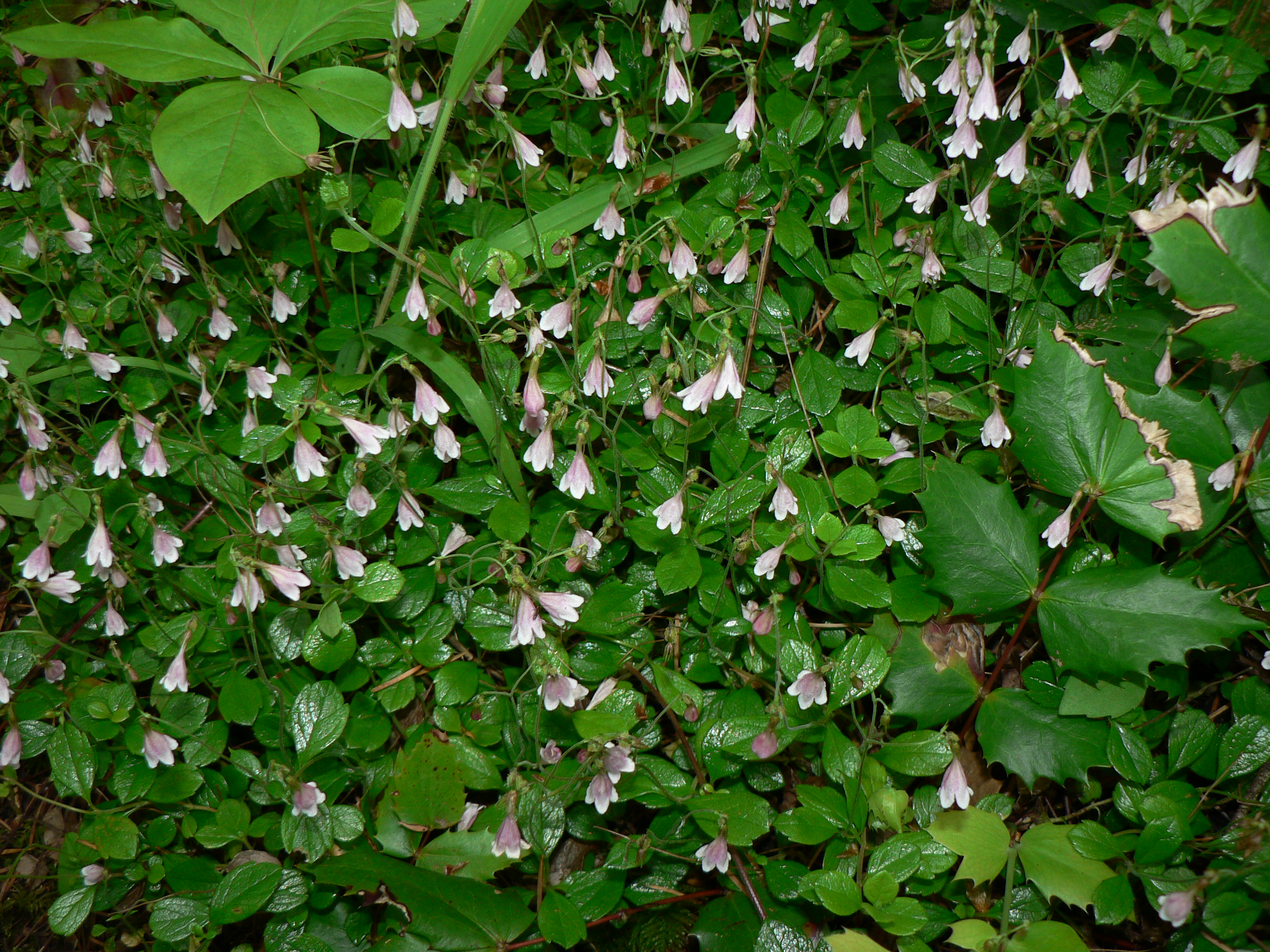
Linnaea borealis may form long-persisting clonal colonies.

Linnaea borealis has a circumpolar distribution in moist subarctic, boreal, or cool temperate forests, extending further south at higher elevations in various mountains, in Europe south to the Alps, in Asia south to northern Japan, and in North America south to northern California and to Arizona and New Mexico in the west, and to West Virginia (and formerly Tennessee) in the Appalachian Mountains in the east.

Clonal stands of Linnaea can be long-persisting, in some places remaining extant even if seed is not produced or if seedling germination or establishment does not occur.

The species was presumably common in areas south of its present range during times of Pleistocene ("Ice Age") glaciations, and its clone-forming perennial growth habit has allowed it to survive the subsequent millennia locally within this former range in various high-elevation or otherwise cool and moist habitats, including algific talus slopes with persisting underground periglacial ice.

== Conservation ==
While the three subspecies of L. borealis are all considered widespread, abundant, and secure in their main, northern ranges, all three subspecies are of conservation concern near the subspecies' range edges or at more southerly, disjunct sites.

In Great Britain, L. borealis ssp. borealis is listed as "nationally scarce", growing mainly in open pine woodlands in Scotland and northernmost England. Foresters consider this plant to be an indicator species of ancient woodlands, often found in association with creeping lady's tresses. It is found in about 50 sites around the country, with most situated in the woods around the Cairngorms; the southernmost locations are four sites in Northumberland and one in County Durham. The sparseness of the sites is responsible for the continued decline of the plant in the country. In Scotland, 37% of L. borealis patches studied consisted of a single genotype, reproducing clonally vegetatively but not producing viable seed. This is a conservation concern because, without viable seed, the species may not be able to re-populate restored habitat, and may not be able to adapt to climate change by establishing new populations.

In the United States, L. borealis ssp. americana is of conservation concern in several states along or near the southern edge of the species' range, including Arizona, Iowa, Massachusetts, North Dakota, Pennsylvania, and West Virginia, and was known historically but now considered extirpated or possibly so in Illinois, Indiana, New Jersey, Ohio, Rhode Island, and Tennessee.

In Canada, Linnaea borealis ssp. longiflora is considered of conservation significance in the Yukon Territory, along the eastern edge of its range, where ssp. americana is widespread and abundant.

Since many of the outlying southern sites for Linnaea borealis are in habitats that are at high elevations or otherwise in cooler microclimates than the surrounding general landscapes, ongoing and prospective climate change has become a significant concern for the conservation of this species in such places, such as Ice Mountain in West Virginia, a low-elevation algific talus slope with persisting buried ice.

== In culture ==
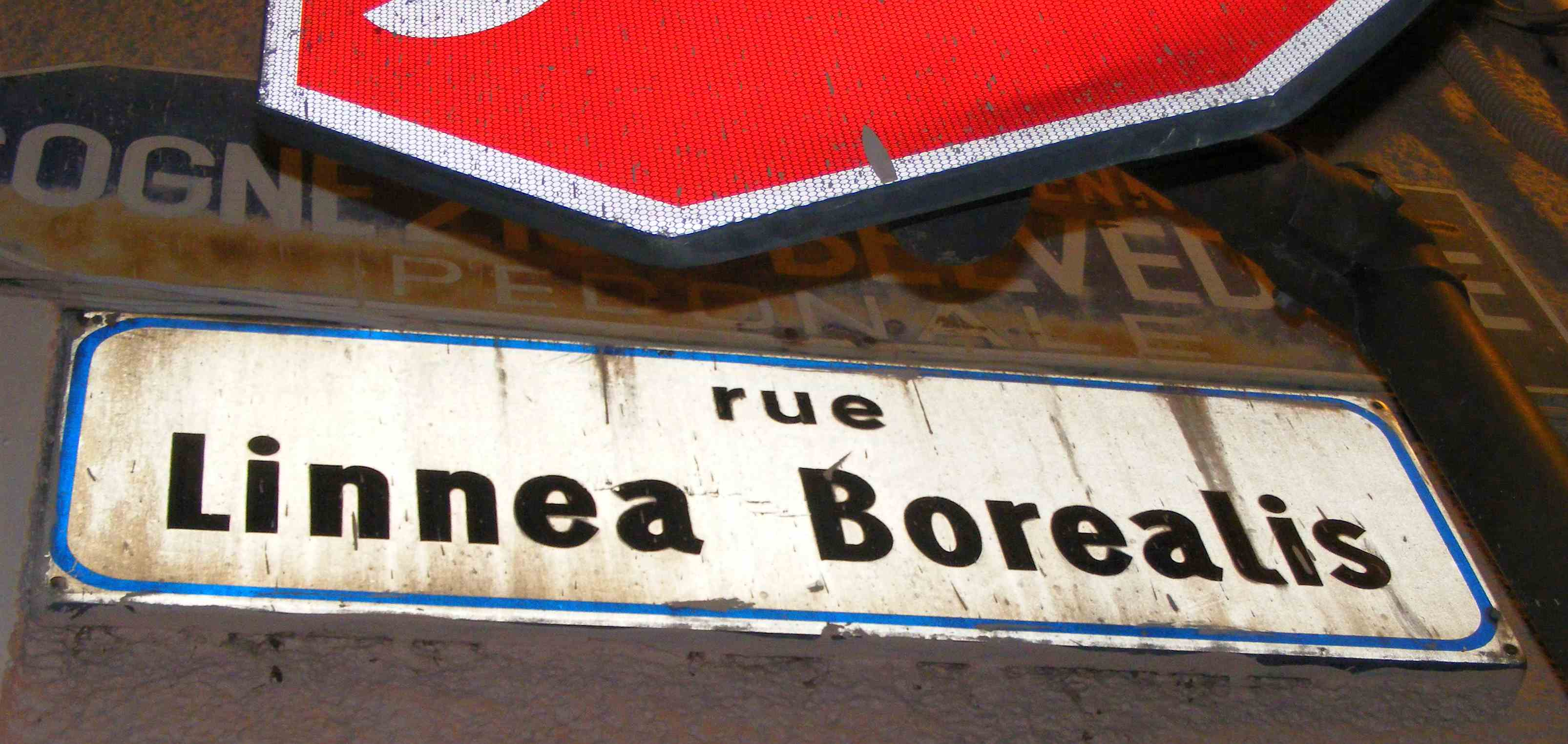
Rue Linnea Borealis, Cogne (Aosta Valley)

The flower of Linnaea borealis is the provincial flower of Småland, the home province of Linnaeus.

=== Linnaeus's personal symbol ===
Linnaeus took L. borealis as his own personal symbol when he was raised to the Swedish nobility in 1757. In his Critica Botanica (1737), Linnaeus had used Gronovius's name Linnaea as an example to advocate the use of commemorative personal names as botanical names:

it is commonly believed that the name of a plant which is derived from that of a botanist shows no connection between the two...[but]...Linnaea was named by the celebrated Gronovius and is a plant of Lapland, lowly, insignificant, disregarded, flowering but for a brief space—after Linnaeus who resembles it.

Carl Linnaeus and his Linnaea borealis motif

Herbarium sheet of Linnaea borealis, thought to be from Tuggenforsen, Lapland, 1732

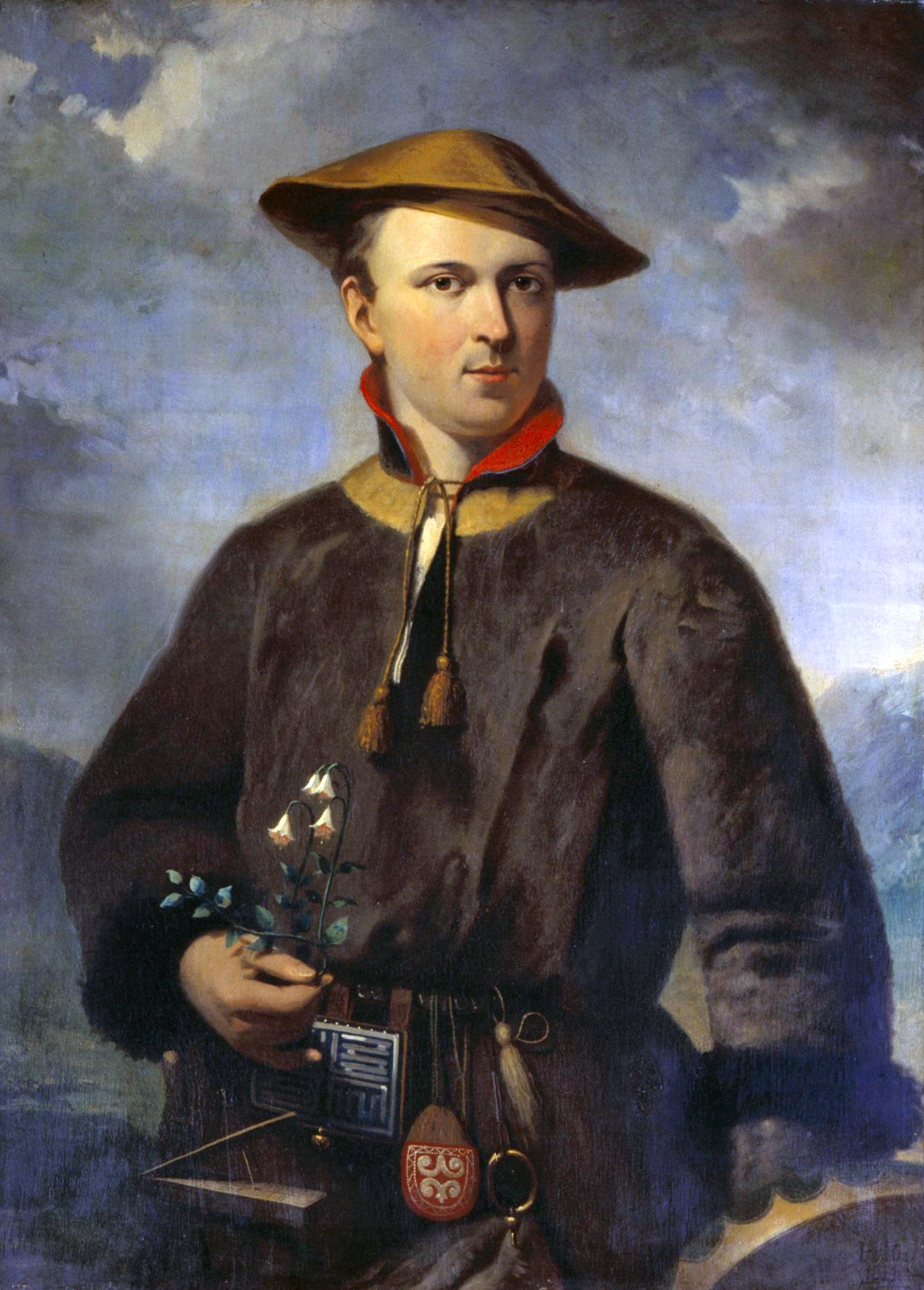
Linnaeus in Sámi costume, holding a Linnaea borealis flower, by Hendrik Hollander, 1853

Linnaeus's porcelain china service

Linnaeus's seal

Linnaeus's coat of arms
