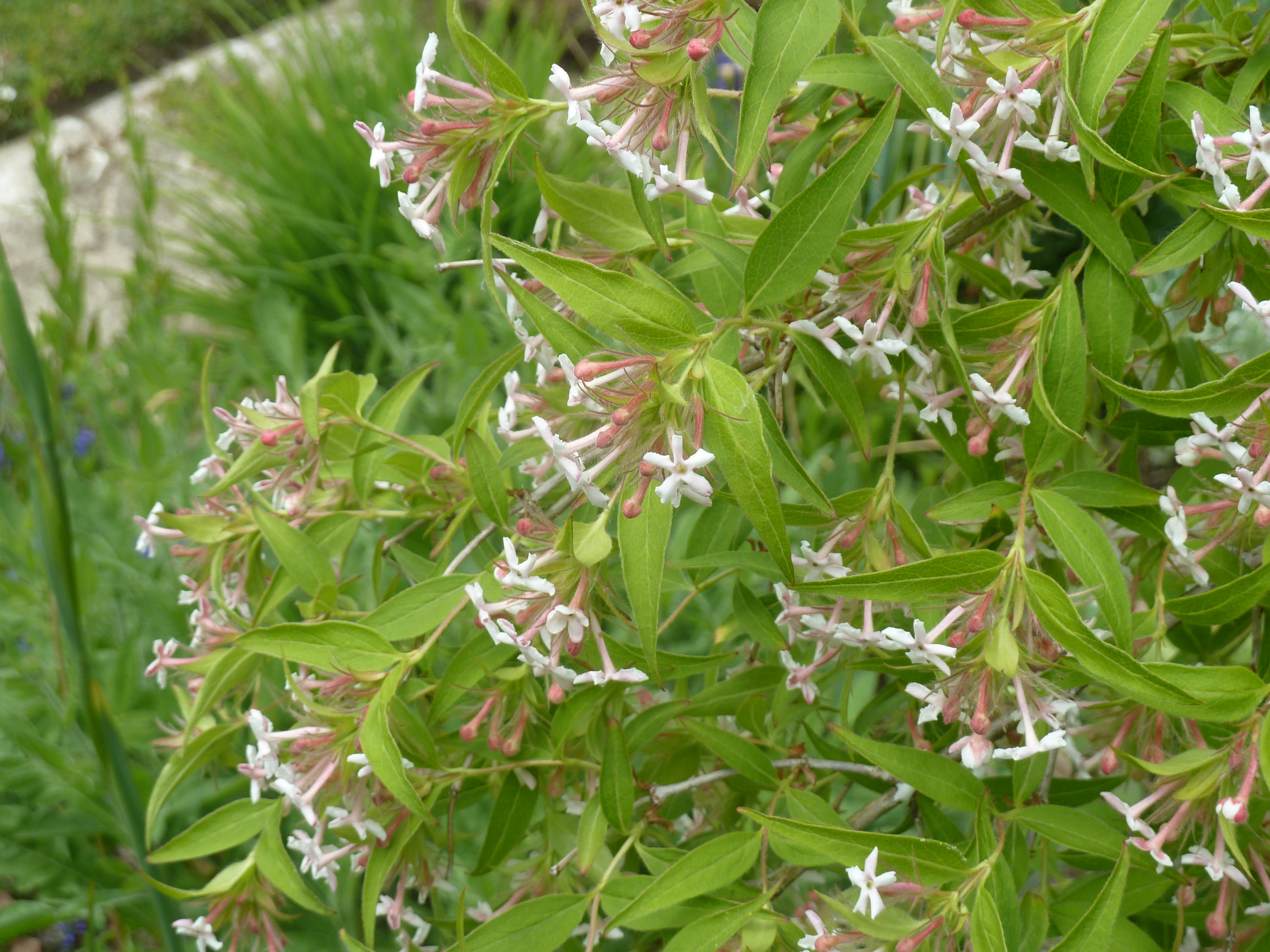
- Zabelia triflora

Scientific classification
- Kingdom: Plantae
- Clade: Embryophytes
- Clade: Tracheophytes
- Clade: Spermatophytes
- Clade: Angiosperms
- Clade: Eudicots
- Clade: Asterids
- Order: Dipsacales
- Family: Caprifoliaceae
- Genus: Zabelia (Rehder) Makino (1948)

Species
- eight; see text

= Zabelia =

Genus of flowering plants in the honeysuckle family

Zabelia is a genus of flowering plants in the family Caprifoliaceae. It includes eight species native to temperate Asia, ranging from Central Asia through the Himalayas to China, Korea, and Japan.

== Species ==
Eight species are accepted.

- Zabelia angustifolia (Bureau & Franch.) Makino
- Zabelia biflora (Turcz.) Makino ex Hisauti & H.Hara
- Zabelia corymbosa (Regel & Schmalh.) Makino
- Zabelia densipila M.P.Hong, Y.C.Kim & B.Y.Lee
- Zabelia dielsii (Graebn.) Makino
- Zabelia integrifolia (Koidz.) Makino ex Ikuse & S.Kuros.
- Zabelia triflora (R.Br. ex Wall.) Makino ex Hisauti & H.Hara
- Zabelia tyaihyoni (Nakai) Hisauti & H.Hara
