= Georg Carl Wilhelm Vatke =

German botanist (1849–1889)

Georg Carl Wilhelm Vatke (12 August 1849, in Berlin – 6 April 1889, in Berlin) was a German botanist, who collected spermatophytes during 1868–1876 in Austria, Germany, Madagascar and Angola. He was an assistant at the botanical gardens in Berlin during 1876–1879, and later became a private scholar.

The botanical genus Vatkea was named in his honor by Karl August Otto Hoffmann in 1880.
