= Paul Graebner =

German botanist (1871–1933)

Carl Otto Robert Peter Paul Graebner (29 June 1871 in Aplerbeck – 6 February 1933 in Berlin) was a German botanist.

In 1895 he obtained his doctorate in Berlin, successively working as an assistant and then as curator (1904) at the botanical gardens. During the 1890s he performed botanical investigations in Jerichower Land and Vorharz with Paul Ascherson (1834–1913).

He later became a professor at the Botanical Garden and Museum in Berlin-Dahlem, from where he conducted floristic and phytogeographical research.

== Selected writings ==
- Synopsis der mitteleuropaischen Flora (with Paul Ascherson), from 1896 - Synopsis of Central European flora.
- Typhaceae u. Sparganiaceae, 1900 - Typhaceae and Sparganiaceae.
- Lehrbuch der ökologischen pflanzengeographie, 1902 (German translation of Eugen Warming's original book in Danish) - Textbook of ecological phytogeography.
- Heide und moor, 1909 - Heath and moor.
- Lehrbuch der allgemeinen Pflanzengeographie, nach entwicklungsgeschichtlichen und physiologisch-ökologischen Gesichtspunkten, 1929 - Textbook of general phytogeography, through developmental and physiologic-ecological aspects.

== Taxon described by him ==
- See Category:Taxa named by Paul Graebner
