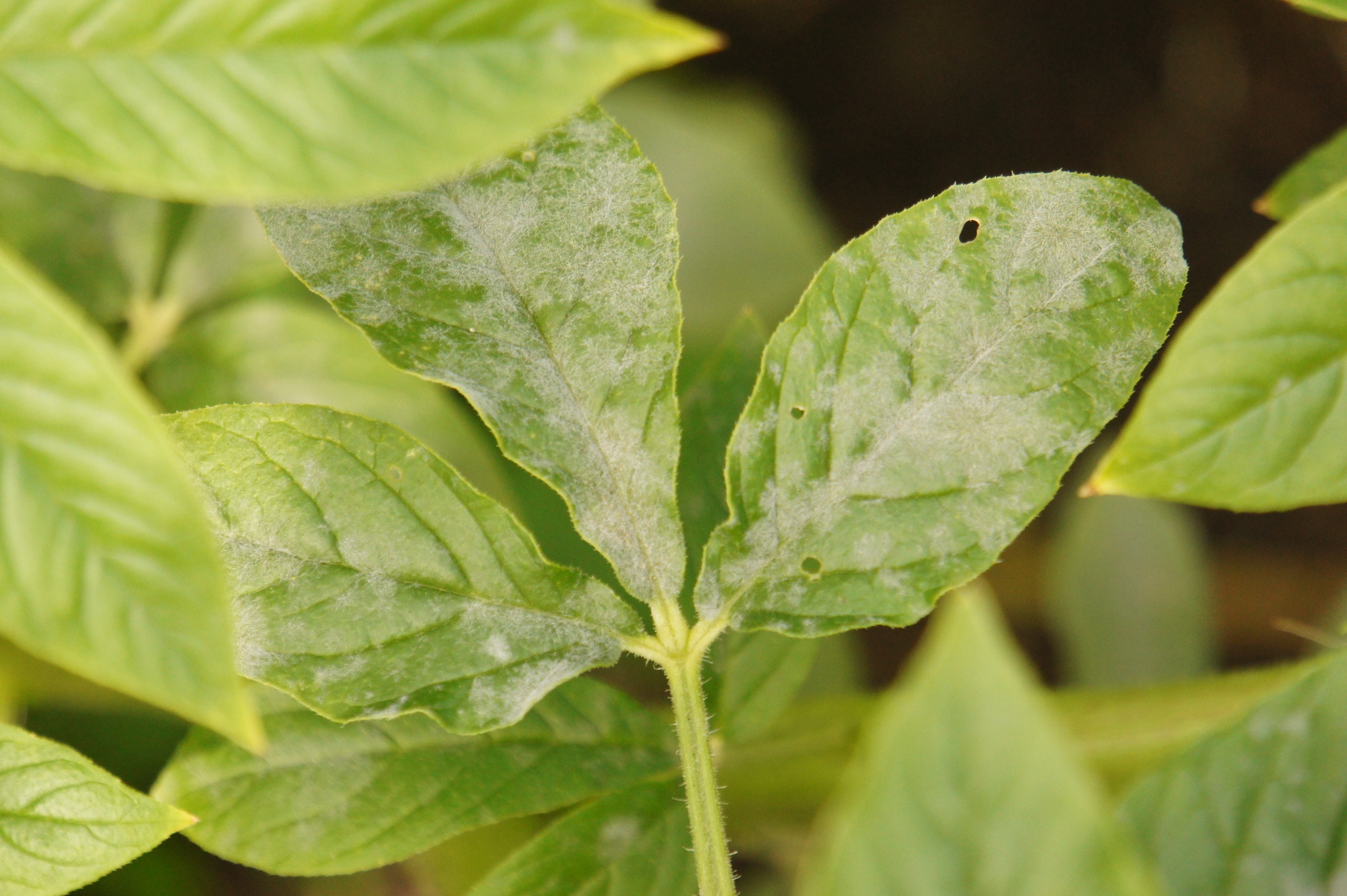
- Erysiphe radulescui on Cleome

Scientific classification
- Kingdom: Fungi
- Division: Ascomycota
- Class: Leotiomycetes
- Order: Helotiales
- Family: Erysiphaceae
- Genus: Erysiphe
- Species: E. radulescui

Binomial name
- Erysiphe radulescui Docea, 1968

Synonyms
- Erysiphe cleomes R.X. Li & D.S. Wang, 1990; Erysiphe cruciferarum var. longispora G.J.M. Gorter, 1988; Oidium brassicae N. Ahmad, A.K. Sarbhoy, Kamal & D.K. Agarwal, 2006

= Erysiphe radulescui =

Species of fungus

Erysiphe radulescui is a species of powdery mildew in the family Erysiphaceae. It is found throughout the world where it infects multiple genera of plants, in the families Brassicaceae, Cleomaceae and Papaveraceae. It comprises much of what was formerly considered the host range of Erysiphe cruciferarum.

== Description ==
Erysiphe radulescui appears as a greyish-white spreading mycelial coating of host leaves, stems and pods. Unlike most Erysiphaceae species, E. radulescui is not highly host-specific; only a few other species share a range across as many different families. The host range includes Arabidopsis, Arabis, Armoracia, Barbarea, Biscutella, Brassica, × Brassicoraphanus, Bunias, Camelina, Capsella, Cardamine, Cochlearia, Crambe, Descurainia, Diplotaxis, Dontostemon, Draba, Eruca, Erucaria, Erucastrum, Erysimum, Eutrema, Fibigia, Hesperis, Hirschfeldia, Iberis, Isatis, Kernera, Lepidium, Lobularia, Lunaria, Malcolmia, Matthiola, Morisia, Nasturtium, Neotorularia, Neslia, Orychophragmus, Peltaria, Raphanus, Rapistrum, Rorippa, Sinapis, Sisymbrium, Sterigmostemum, Thlaspi, Turritis and Vella in the Brassicaceae, Cleome, the type host, in the Cleomaceae and Papaver in the Papaveraceae. The host range may be even larger with some related genera also known to host powdery mildew. Many of the current host genera also host other species of powdery mildew.

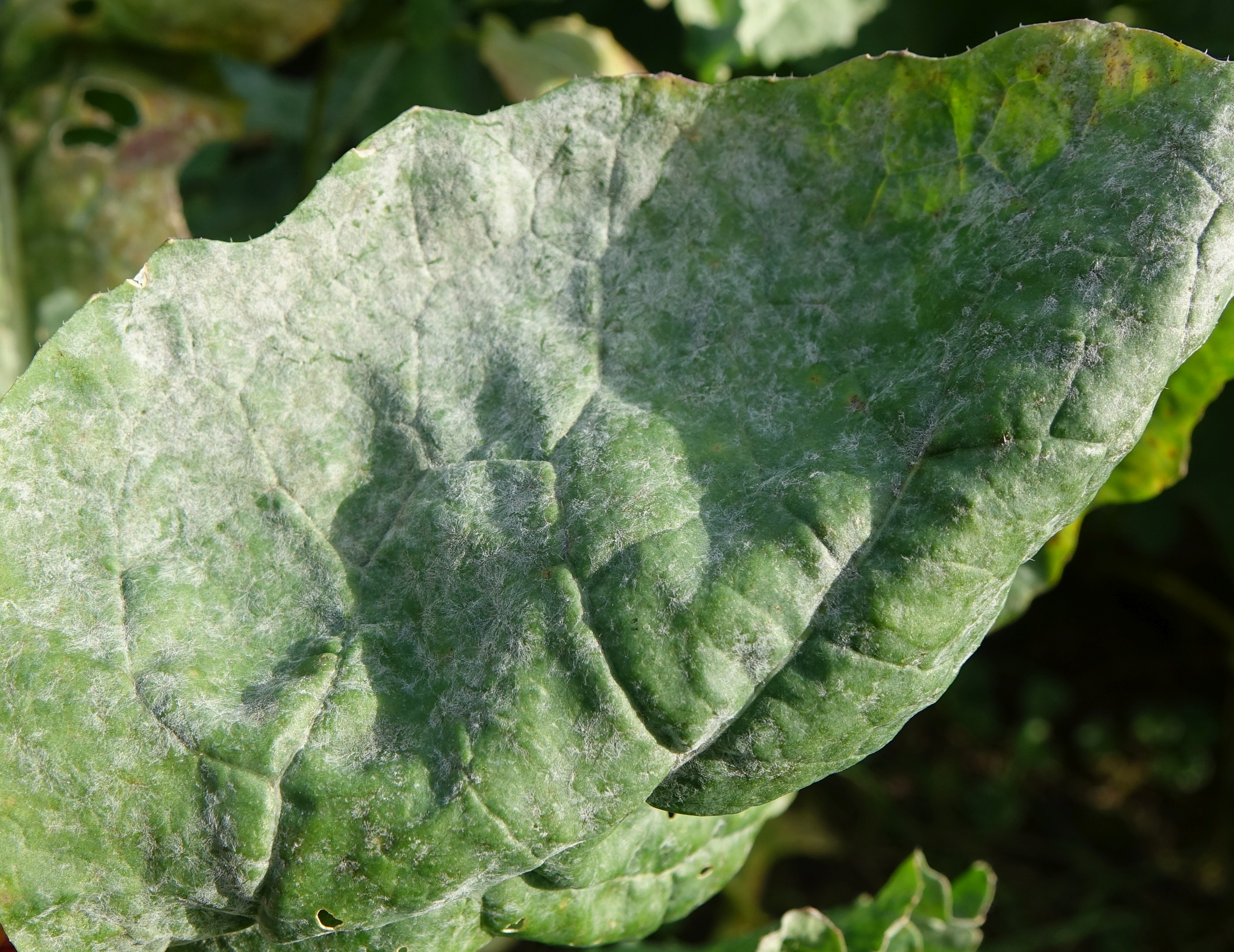
Erysiphe radulescui on Brassica

Hosts such as Brassica are widely cultivated while other hosts are frequent as arable weeds. Erysiphe radulescui is capable of infecting the former from the latter and can become a problem on cultivated plants which, although likely to remain alive, can have a reduced rate of photosynthesis and consequently reduced yield.

== Taxonomy ==
The fungus was formally described in 1968 by Docea, but was considered conspecific with Erysiphe cruciferarum until 2024. The specific epithet is in honour of Eugen Rădulescu, a Romanian plant pathologist. The type specimen was collected in Romania.

== Micromorphology ==
=== Description ===
The mycelium is white or greyish, commonly found on both sides of the leaf, and regularly on stems or even pods. The hyphal appressoria are nipple-shaped to moderately lobed, and occur solitarily. Conidophores arise from the upper surface of their mother cell. They are erect with cylindrical foot cells that are usually straight. The conidiophores produce single conidia. The conidia are ellipsoid to barrel-shaped and cylindrical. The chasmothecia (fruiting bodies) have numerous myceloid appendages mostly in the lower half. The appendages are hyaline but become pigmented brownish in the lower half. The peridium of the chasmothecia has cells of irregular shape. Erysiphe radulescui has most commonly three to six spores per ascus which are roughly ellipsoid and colourless. The asci are clavate-saccate and are usually short-stalked but sometimes sessile.

=== Measurements ===
Hyphal cells measure 40–75 × (2.5–)3–8(–10) μm. Hyphal appressoria are 2–7 μm in diameter. Conidiophores are up to 120 μm long, with foot cells that measure 15–50 × 7–10 μm. Secondary conidia are (25–)30–45(–62.5) × 10–21 μm. The chasmothecia are 75–150 μm in diameter with peridium cells 5–25 μm in diameter. Appendages are up to 4× the diameter of the chasmothecia and 4–10 μm wide. Asci number (3–)4–10(–12) and are (40–)50–85 × 25–45(–55) μm with ascospores measuring (15–)18–30(–35) × 10–18(–20) μm.
