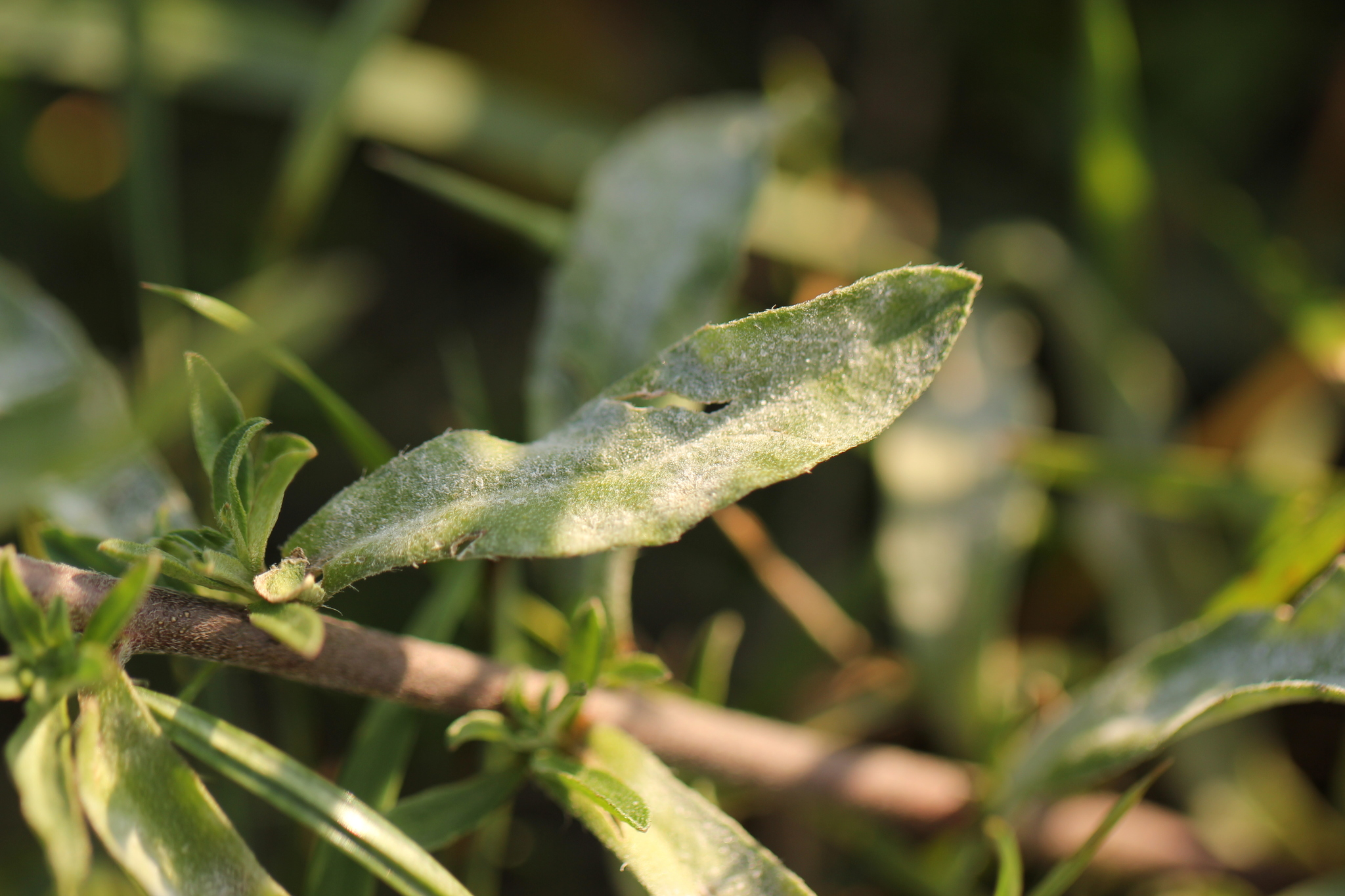
- Erysiphe cruciferarum on Berteroa incana

Scientific classification
- Kingdom: Fungi
- Division: Ascomycota
- Class: Leotiomycetes
- Order: Helotiales
- Family: Erysiphaceae
- Genus: Erysiphe
- Species: E. cruciferarum

Binomial name
- Erysiphe cruciferarum Opiz ex L. Junell, 1967

Synonyms
- Erysiphe pisi var. cruciferarum (Opiz ex L. Junell) Ialongo, 1992; Erysiphe communis f. alyssi Jacz., 1927

= Erysiphe cruciferarum =

Species of fungus

Erysiphe cruciferarum is a species of powdery mildew in the family Erysiphaceae. It is distributed across Asia, Europe and North Africa, where it infects species of the genera Alyssum, Aurinia and Berteroa (Brassicaceae). It was previously considered to be the most common species on all Brassicaceae, but the species on many common hosts, including major crops such as Brassica, is Erysiphe radulescui.

== Description ==
Erysiphe cruciferarum exhibits typical powdery mildew characteristics, appearing as small radiating, diffuse colonies of superficial white mycelium on the surface of the leaf; usually both sides of the leaf show white, powdery fungal growth. Similarly to most Erysiphaceae species, E. cruciferarum is highly host-specific with a host range comprising just three genera. As a result, the species is unlikely to cause problems on crops or garden or greenhouse plants. This is in contrast to Erysiphe radulescui, which infects many genera in the Brassicaceae including crops and wild plants, including some which are regular arable weeds from which it has potential to jump to cultivated individuals.

== Taxonomy ==
The fungus was formally described in 1967 by Junell. The specific epithet refers to the group containing its hosts, the crucifers (Brassicaceae). The type specimen was collected in Czech Republic. Erysiphe cruciferarum was formerly a species with a very large host range but this was later narrowed with other species split on the basis of genetic analysis, namely Erysiphe alliariicola and Erysiphe radulescui. Infections on some former hosts of E. cruciferarum, such as Fumaria and Pseudo-fumaria, have not yet been assigned to other species and are referred to as Erysiphe cruciferarum s.l.

== Micromorphology ==
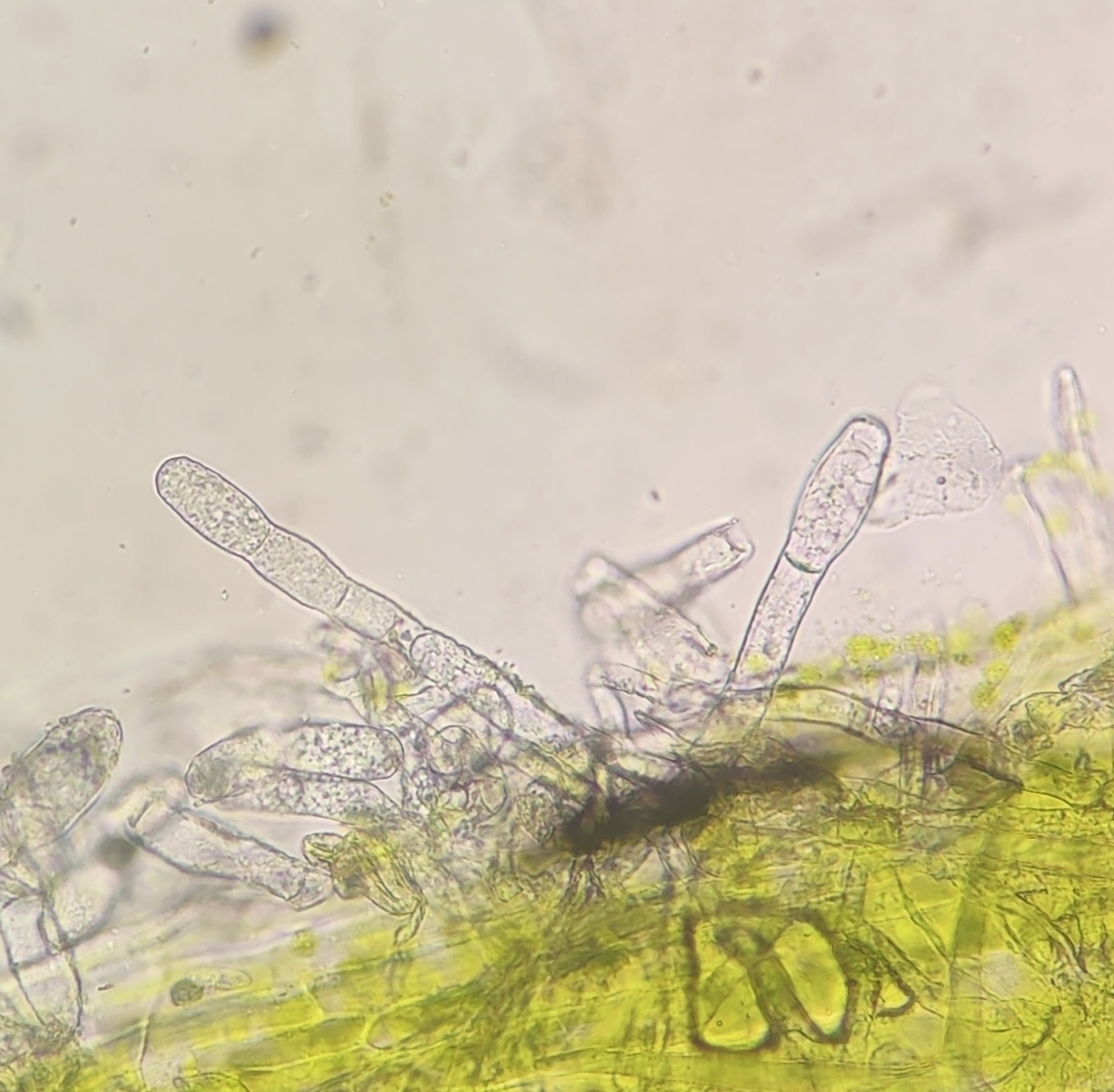
Single conidia of Erysiphe cruciferarum from Berteroa incana

=== Description ===
The mycelium is white or greyish, commonly found on both sides of the leaf, and regularly on stems or even pods. The hyphal appressoria are nipple-shaped to moderately lobed, and occur solitarily. Conidophores arise from the upper surface of their mother cell. They are erect with cylindrical foot cells that are straight or occasionally curved. The conidiophores produce single conidia. The primary conidia are obovoid. Secondary conidia are barrel-shaped. The chasmothecia (fruiting bodies) have numerous myceloid appendages mostly in the lower half. They may become pigmented at the base. The peridium of the chasmothecia has cells of irregular shape. Erysiphe cruciferarum has three to seven spores per ascus which are roughly ellipsoid and colourless. The asci are saccate and are either almost sessile or short-stalked.

=== Measurements ===
Hyphal cells measure 3–8 μm in diameter. Hyphal appressoria are 3–6 μm in diameter. Conidiophores are up to 100 μm long, with foot cells that measure 15–40 × 6–9(–10) μm. Conidia are 20–50 μm in length. The chasmothecia are 80–140 μm in diameter with peridium cells 8–25 μm in diameter. Appendages are up to 1.5× the diameter of the chasmothecia and (3–)4–9(–10) μm wide. Asci number 4–18 and are 45–65 × 25–45 μm with ascospores measuring 15–23 × 9–14 μm.
