= Coleophora onopordiella =

Scientific classification
- Kingdom: Animalia
- Phylum: Arthropoda
- Clade: Pancrustacea
- Class: Insecta
- Order: Lepidoptera
- Family: Coleophoridae
- Genus: Coleophora
- Species: C. onopordiella

Binomial name
- Coleophora onopordiella Zeller, 1849

Synonyms
- Coleophora cerinaula Meyrick 1936; Coleophora eremica Amsel, 1935; Coleophora fusca Toll, 1952; Coleophora pseudophlomidella Toll, 1952; Coleophora sivandella Toll, 1959; Klinzigedia litorella Nemes, 2003

Species of moth

Coleophora onopordiella is a moth of the family Coleophoridae. It is found in France and Italy, and from Poland to Greece.

The larvae feed on Arctium, Berteroa, Bromus, Erysimum, Marrubium vulgare, Onopordum, Salvia, Secale, Stachys officinalis and Xeranthemum species.
