= Morigia =

Morigia is a surname. Notable people with the surname include:

- Bonincontro Morigia (fl. 14th century), Italian historical writer
- Camillo Morigia (1743–1795), Italian architect
- Giacomo Antonio Morigia (1633–1708), Italian Roman Catholic archbishop

== See also ==
- Morisia
