= P. illyricum =

P. illyricum may refer to:

- Pancratium illyricum, a flowering plant species
- Polystichum illyricum, a fern hybrid species

== See also ==
- O. illyricum (Onopordum illyricum)
