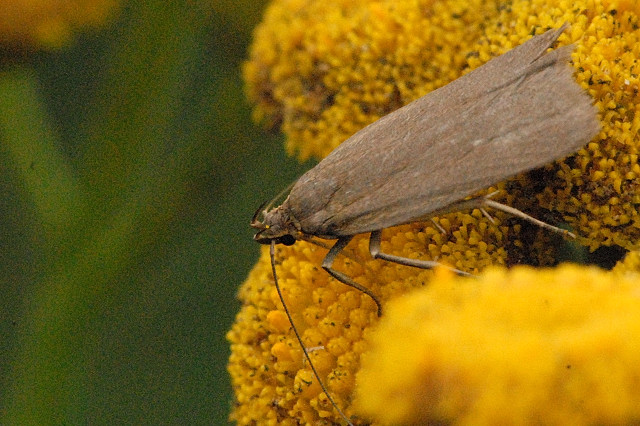

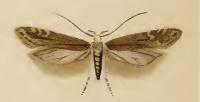

Scientific classification
- Domain: Eukaryota
- Kingdom: Animalia
- Phylum: Arthropoda
- Class: Insecta
- Order: Lepidoptera
- Family: Gelechiidae
- Genus: Scrobipalpa
- Species: S. acuminatella

Binomial name
- Scrobipalpa acuminatella (Sircom, 1850)

Synonyms
- Gelechia acuminatella Sircom, 1850; Gelechia pulliginella Sircom, 1850; Gelechia cirsiella Stainton, 1851; Lita porcella Heinemann, 1870; Lita ingloriella Heinemann, 1870; Gelechia gracilella Stainton, 1871

= Scrobipalpa acuminatella =

Species of moth

Scrobipalpa acuminatella is a moth of the family Gelechiidae. It is found in most of Europe, as well as Turkey, southern Siberia, Central Asia (Afghanistan, northern Iran, western Kazakhstan) and China (Anhui). It was recently reported from Canada, with records from Ontario and Québec.

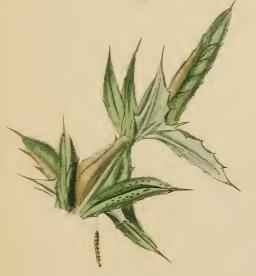
A mined thistle leaf

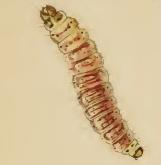
Larva

The wingspan is 10.5–14.5 mm (0.41–0.57 in). Terminal joint of palpi shorter than second. Forewings pointed, especially in female rather dark fuscous, paler-sprinkled, often ochreous- mixed in disc, sometimes with a few blackish scales posteriorly; stigmata darker, indistinct, first discal beyond plical; traces of pale fascia at 3/4 faintly perceptible. Hindwings over 1, light grey, sometimes darker posteriorly. The larva is grey-greenish; dots black; head brown; 2 pale brown, with two blackish spots.

The moths are on wing from April to August depending on the location.

The larvae feed on Carduus and Cirsium species, but also Cotton thistle, Artemisia species and Serratula tinctoria.
