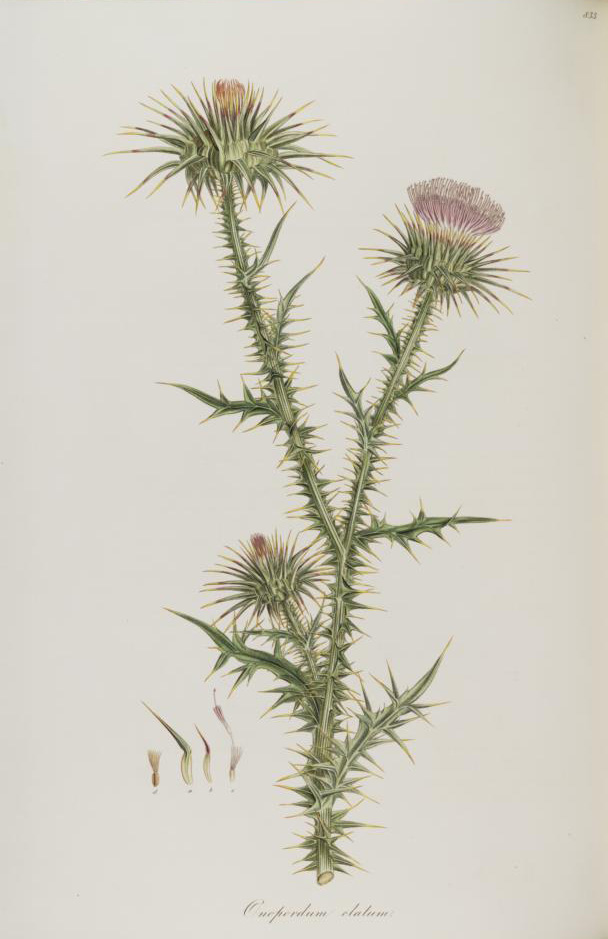

Scientific classification
- Kingdom: Plantae
- Clade: Tracheophytes
- Clade: Angiosperms
- Clade: Eudicots
- Clade: Asterids
- Order: Asterales
- Family: Asteraceae
- Genus: Onopordum
- Species: O. tauricum

Binomial name
- Onopordum tauricum Willd.

Synonyms
- Onopordum argolicum Boiss.; Onopordum corymbosum subsp. visegradense Franco; Onopordum elatum Sm.; Onopordum virens DC.; Onopordum viscosum Hornem. ex Spreng.

= Onopordum tauricum =

Species of flowering plant

Onopordum tauricum, the Taurian thistle or bull cottonthistle, is a species of thistle. It is native to Eurasia and is known in Australia and the western United States as an introduced species. It easily becomes a noxious weed, similar to its relative, Onopordum acanthium.

This is a biennial herb producing a sticky, glandular, very spiny stem up to 2 meters tall. The spiny, bright light green leaves are up to 25 centimeters long and are divided into triangular lobes. The inflorescence is made up of several large flower heads each up to 7 centimeters wide. They are lined with long, spiny phyllaries and bear pink-purple tubular flowers up to 3 centimeters long.
