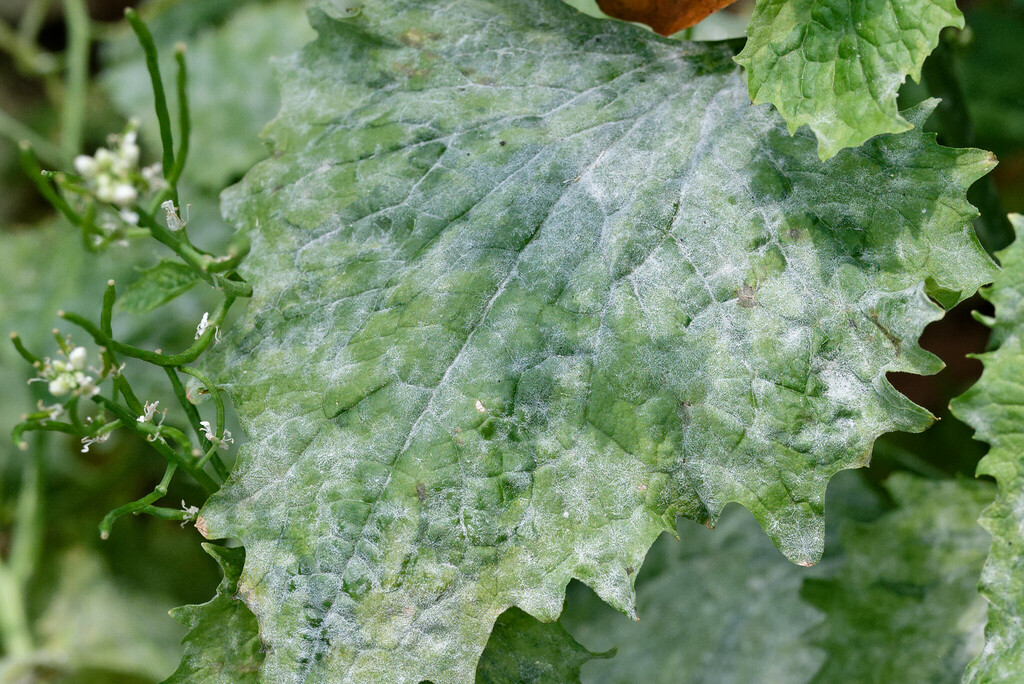
- Erysiphe alliariicola on Alliaria petiolata

Scientific classification
- Kingdom: Fungi
- Division: Ascomycota
- Class: Leotiomycetes
- Order: Helotiales
- Family: Erysiphaceae
- Genus: Erysiphe
- Species: E. alliariicola

Binomial name
- Erysiphe alliariicola M. Bradshaw & U. Braun, 2024

= Erysiphe alliariicola =

Species of fungus

Erysiphe alliariicola is a species of powdery mildew in the family Erysiphaceae. It is found on plants in the genus Alliaria in Eurasia and North America (where A. petiolata is an invasive species) as well as occasionally on Thlaspi.

== Description ==
The fungus forms thin, white irregular patches on the leaves of its host. Erysiphe alliariicola, like most Erysiphaceae, is highly host-specific and only infects two genera. It is the only species to infect Alliaria, and has been theorised to be applicable as a way to reduce the severity of the impact of this genus where it is invasive. It has also been reported as infecting Thlaspi in North America.

== Taxonomy ==
The fungus was formally described in 2024 by Michael Bradshaw and Uwe Braun. The species epithet refers to the host genus, Alliaria. The type specimen was collected in Germany. E. alliariicola was formerly considered conspecific with Erysiphe cruciferarum but was split from this species on the basis of genetic analysis.

== Micromorphology ==
=== Description ===
The mycelium is white or greyish, commonly found on both sides of the leaf, and regularly on stems or even pods. The hyphal appressoria are nipple-shaped to moderately lobed, and occur solitarily. Conidophores arise from the upper surface of their mother cell. They are erect with cylindrical foot cells that are straight or curved. The conidiophores produce single conidia. The conidia are ellipsoid to barrel-shaped, with some cylindrical long conidia. The chasmothecia (fruiting bodies) have not been described.

=== Measurements ===
Hyphal cells measure 2–7 μm in diameter. Hyphal appressoria are 2–7 μm in diameter. Conidiophores are up to 110 μm long, with foot cells that measure 15–40 × 6–10 μm. Conidia are 25–45 × 10–20 μm.
