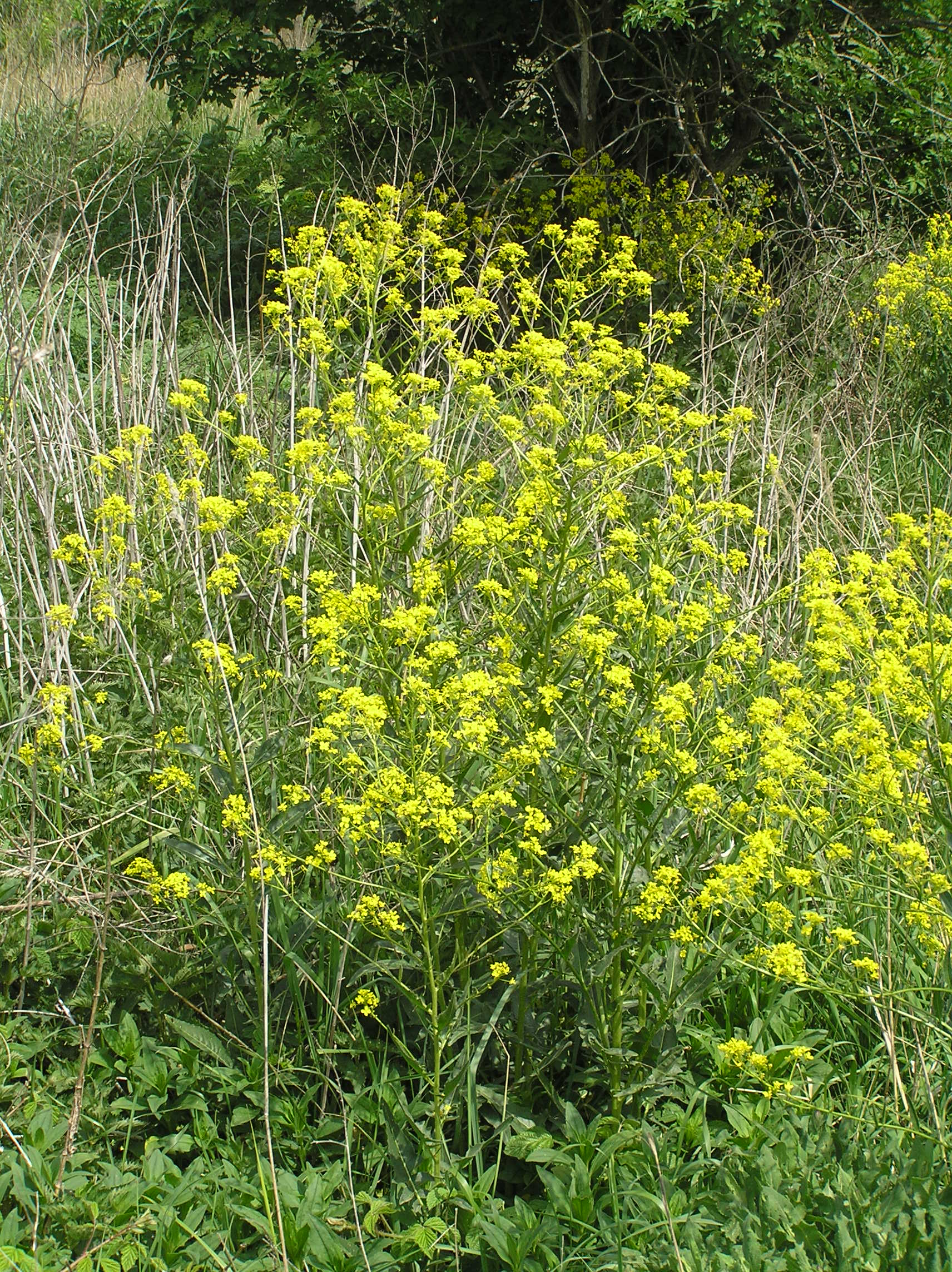

Scientific classification
- Kingdom: Plantae
- Clade: Tracheophytes
- Clade: Angiosperms
- Clade: Eudicots
- Clade: Rosids
- Order: Brassicales
- Family: Brassicaceae
- Genus: Bunias
- Species: B. orientalis

Binomial name
- Bunias orientalis L.

= Bunias orientalis =

Species of flowering plant

Bunias orientalis, the Turkish wartycabbage, warty-cabbage, hill mustard, or Turkish rocket, is an edible wild plant species in the genus Bunias. It is classified as an invasive neophyte in most of Middle Europe and parts of North America.

It was in use as a food plant in France before 1920.
