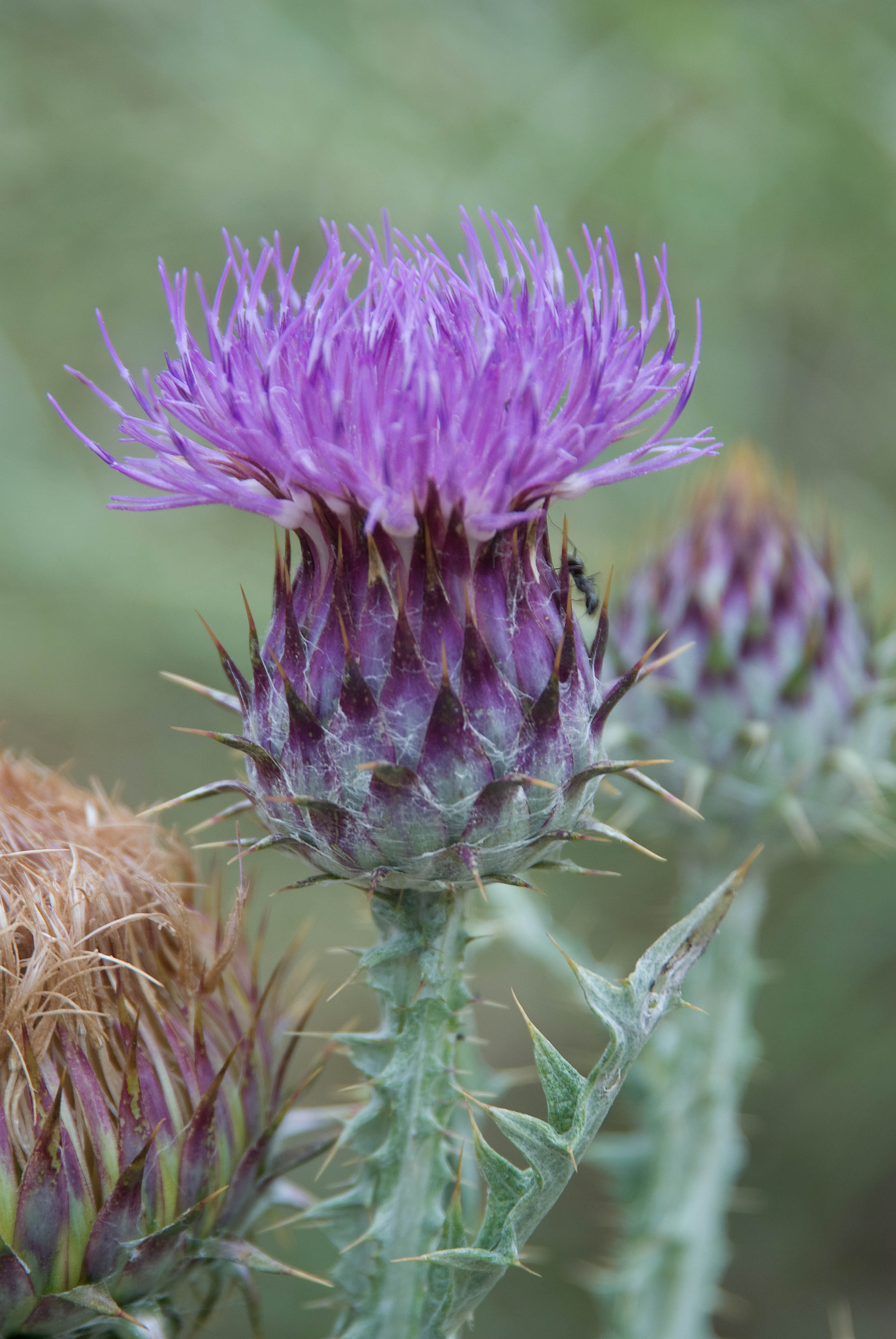
- Flowerhead

Scientific classification
- Kingdom: Plantae
- Clade: Embryophytes
- Clade: Tracheophytes
- Clade: Angiosperms
- Clade: Eudicots
- Clade: Asterids
- Order: Asterales
- Family: Asteraceae
- Genus: Onopordum
- Species: O. nervosum

Binomial name
- Onopordum nervosum Boiss.

= Onopordum nervosum =

Species of flowering plant

Onopordum nervosum, called Moor's cotton thistle or reticulate thistle, is a species of flowering plant in the genus Onopordum native to the Iberian Peninsula. It has gained the Royal Horticultural Society's Award of Garden Merit.

== Subspecies ==
The following subspecies are currently accepted:

- Onopordum nervosum subsp. castellanum Gonz.Sierra, Pérez Morales, Penas & Rivas Mart.
- Onopordum nervosum subsp. nervosum
