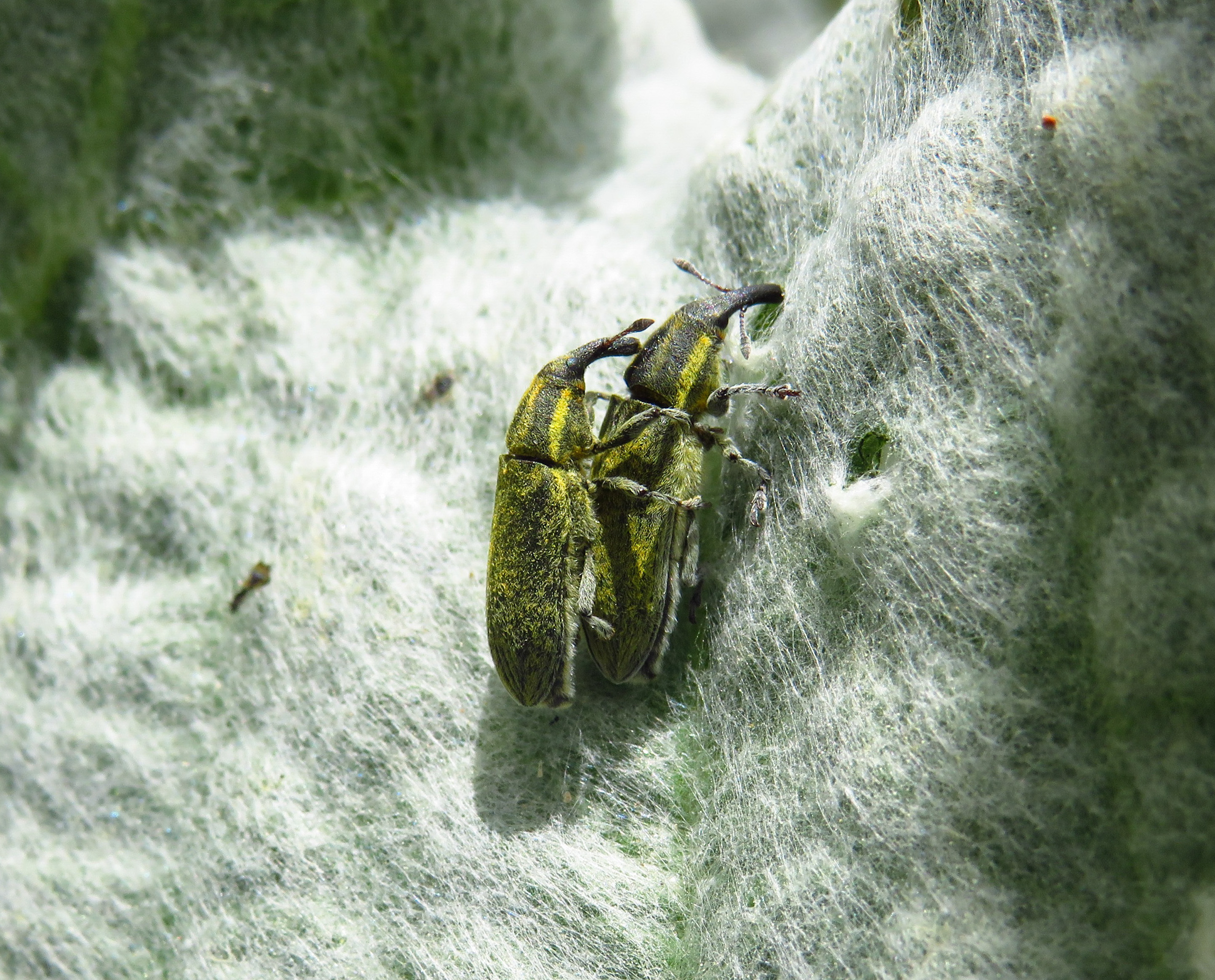

Scientific classification
- Kingdom: Animalia
- Phylum: Arthropoda
- Clade: Pancrustacea
- Class: Insecta
- Order: Coleoptera
- Suborder: Polyphaga
- Infraorder: Cucujiformia
- Superfamily: Curculionoidea
- Family: Curculionidae
- Genus: Lixus
- Species: L. cardui

Binomial name
- Lixus cardui Olivier, 1807

= Lixus cardui =

Species of beetle

Lixus cardui is a species of true weevil found in Europe

It was introduced in Australia to control scotch thistle Onopordum acanthium, an invasive weed.
