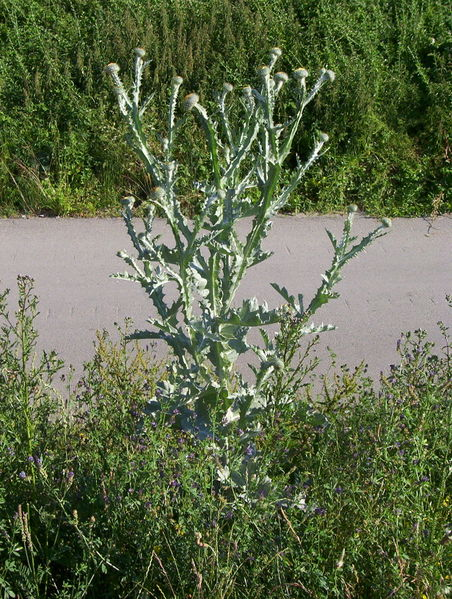

Scientific classification
- Kingdom: Plantae
- Clade: Embryophytes
- Clade: Tracheophytes
- Clade: Spermatophytes
- Clade: Angiosperms
- Clade: Eudicots
- Clade: Asterids
- Order: Asterales
- Family: Asteraceae
- Genus: Onopordum
- Species: O. acanthium

Binomial name
- Onopordum acanthium L.

= Onopordum acanthium =

Species of flowering plant in the daisy family

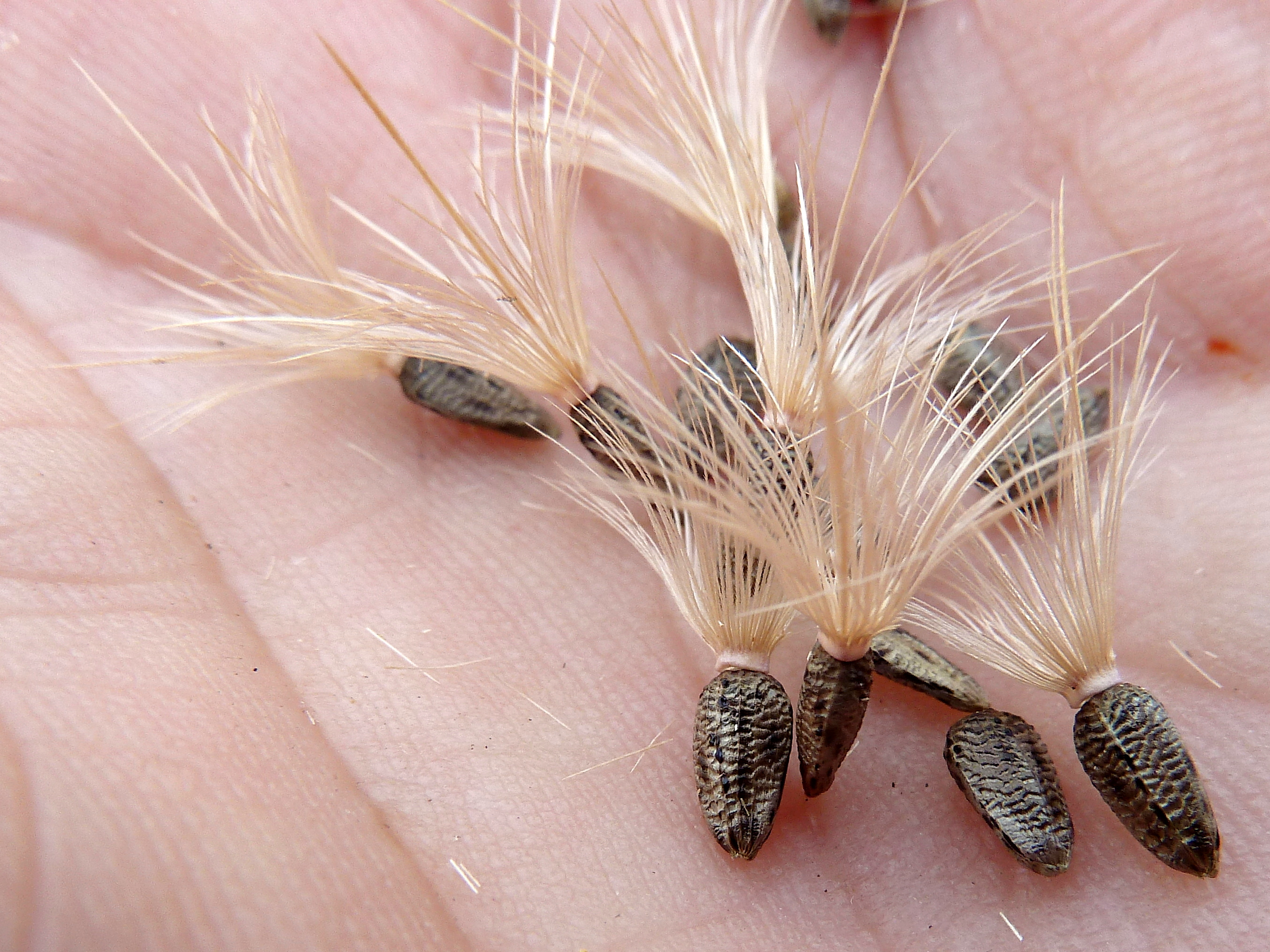
Separate cypselae

Onopordum acanthium (cotton thistle, Scotch (or Scottish) thistle) is a flowering plant in the family Asteraceae. It is native to Europe and Western Asia from the Iberian Peninsula east to Kazakhstan, and north to central Scandinavia, and widely naturalised elsewhere, with especially large populations present in the United States and Australia. It is a vigorous biennial plant with coarse, spiny leaves and conspicuous spiny-winged stems.

It should not be confused with Cirsium vulgare (spear thistle), which is also known as Scotch or Scottish thistle and is the national flower of Scotland. Spear thistle is native to Britain, while cotton thistle is non-native.

== Description ==
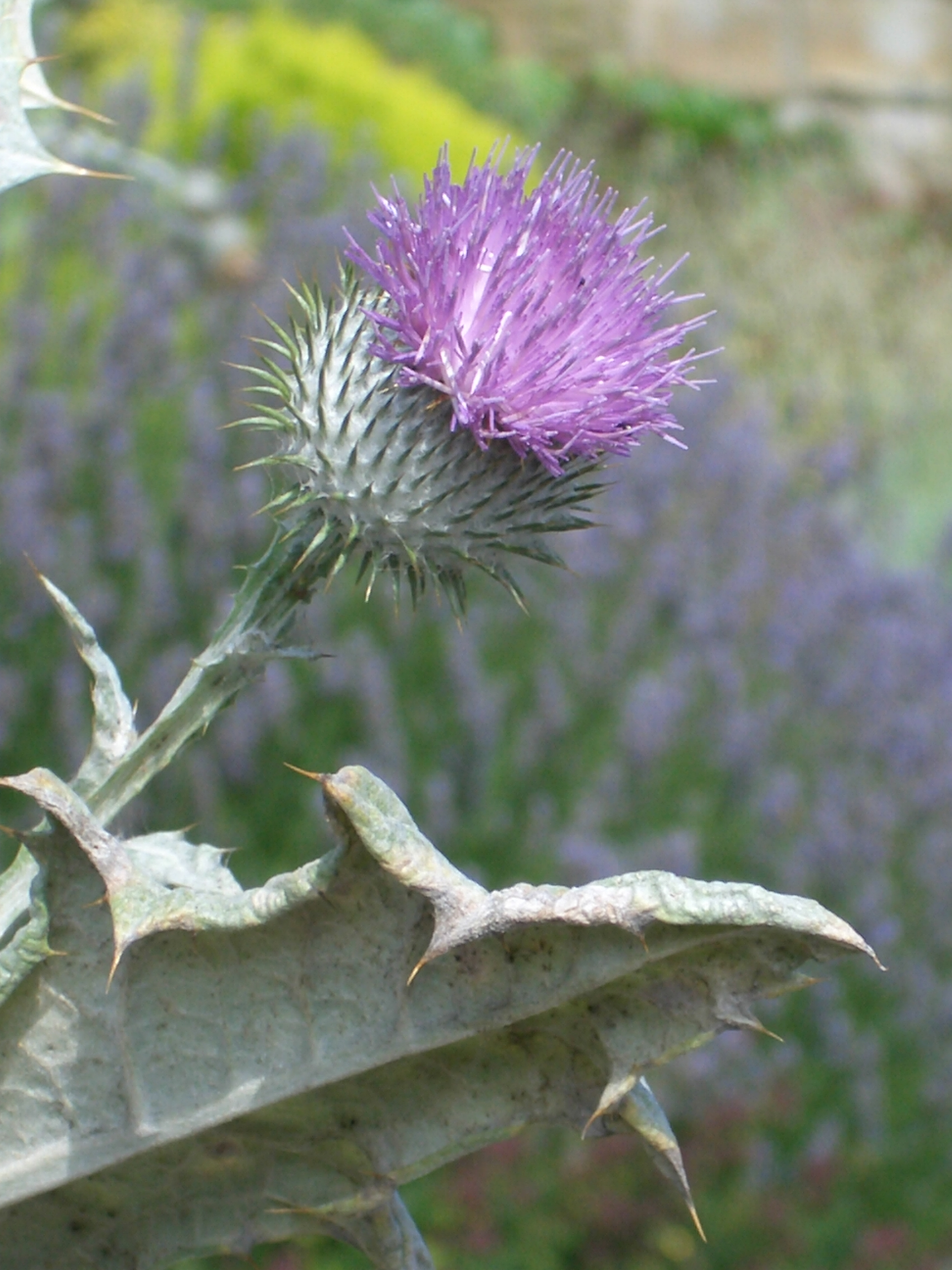
Detailed image

It is a biennial plant, producing a large rosette of spiny leaves the first year. The plants typically germinate in the autumn after the first rains and exist as rosettes throughout the first year, forming a stout, fleshy taproot that may extend down 30 cm (12 in) or more for a food reserve.

In the second year, the plant can grow to as much as 3 m (9.8 ft) tall with a width of up to 1.5 m (4 ft 11 in). The leaves are 10–50 cm (3.9–19.7 in) wide, alternate, spiny, and often covered with white woolly hairs with the lower surface more densely covered than the upper. The leaves are deeply lobed with long, stiff spines along the margins. Fine hairs give the plant a greyish appearance. The massive main stem may be 10 cm (3.9 in) wide at the base and branched in the upper part. Each stem has a vertical row of broad, spiny wings (conspicuous ribbon-like leafy material), typically 2–3 cm (0.79–1.18 in) wide, extending to the base of the flower head.

The flowers are globe shaped, 2–6 cm (0.79–2.36 in) in diameter, from dark pink to lavender, and are produced in the summer. The flower buds form first at the tip of the stem and later at the tip of the axillary branches. They appear singly or in groups of two or three on branch tips. The plants are androgynous, with both pistil and stamens, and sit above numerous, long, stiff, spine-tipped bracts, all pointing outwards, the lower ones wider apart and pointing downwards. After flowering, the ovary starts swelling and forms about 8,400 to 40,000 seeds per plant.

== Distribution and habitat ==
Cotton thistles are native to Eurasia. The plant prefers habitats with dry summers, such as the Mediterranean region, growing best in sandy clay and calcareous soils which are rich in ammonium salts. It grows in ruderal places, as well as in dry pastures and fields. Its preferred habitats are natural areas, disturbed sites, roadsides, fields, and especially sites with fertile soils, agricultural areas, range/grasslands, riparian zones, scrub/shrublands valleys and plains along with water courses. Temperature and moisture, rather than soil nutrient concentrations, determine the ecological performance of Onopordum species.

In Europe, the plant tends to colonise disturbed pastures. In its native range, cotton thistle is considered a weak competitor that needs regeneration gaps to develop and maintain stands; populations tend to retreat when disturbance ceases. The plant has been widely introduced at mid-latitudes across much of North America.

Scotch thistles can spread rapidly. For example, it was first found in Utah in 1963. By 1981, it covered approximately 6070 hectares in 17 counties. Eight years later, it had spread to cover more than 22,540 hectares in 22 counties.

== Ecology ==
Onopordum acanthium reproduces by seeds only. Most seeds germinate in autumn after the first rains, but some seeds can germinate year round under favourable moisture and temperature conditions. Seeds that germinate in late autumn become biennials. When they germinate earlier, they can behave as annuals. Buried seed can remain viable in the soil seed bank for at least seven years, possibly for up to twenty years or more. Yearly seed production and seed dormancy are highly variable, depending on environmental conditions.

The slender and smooth achenes are about 3 mm long, brown with gray markings. They are tipped with a pappus of slender bristles. Mainly locally dispersed by wind, or more widely by humans, birds, wildlife, livestock or streams, the seeds are sensitive to light and only germinate when close to the surface. Seedlings will emerge from soil depths up to 4.5 cm, 0.5 cm are optimal. While some seeds will germinate in the dark, most germination occurs with alternating light/dark cycles, with an optimal day length of eight hours.

The leaves of cotton thistle are eaten by the caterpillars of some Lepidoptera, such as the thistle ermine (Myelois circumvoluta).

== Taxonomy and naming ==
Three subspecies are accepted:

- Onopordum acanthium subsp. acanthium. Most of the species' range.
- Onopordum acanthium subsp. gautieri (Rouy) Franco. France, Spain.
- Onopordum acanthium subsp. parnassicum (Boiss. & Heldr.) Nyman. Greece.

The genus botanical name is derived from the Ancient Greek words όνος (ónos=donkey), πέρδω (pérdo=to fart), and άκανθος (ácanthos=thorn), meaning 'donkey fart thorny food'.

The common name of cotton thistle refers to the cotton-like hairs on the leaves. Other names are Scots thistle or Scottish thistle, heraldic thistle and woolly thistle. The name Scots thistle refers to the flower used as the national emblem of Scotland. However, this is Cirsium vulgare., not onopordum.

== Uses ==
It is grown as an ornamental plant for its bold foliage and large flowers. It has been used to treat cancers and ulcers and to diminish discharges of mucous membranes. A recent study of a crude extract from the leaves of the plant demonstrated activity against glioblastoma, a type of very malignant brain tumor. The receptacle was eaten in earlier times like an artichoke. The cottony hairs on the stem have been occasionally collected to stuff pillows. Oil from the seeds has been used for burning and cooking.

Thistles produce abundant nectar for pollinators and provide seeds and floss for birds such as the goldfinch. Large-flowered tall thistles in particular provide considerable nectar.

== Invasive species ==
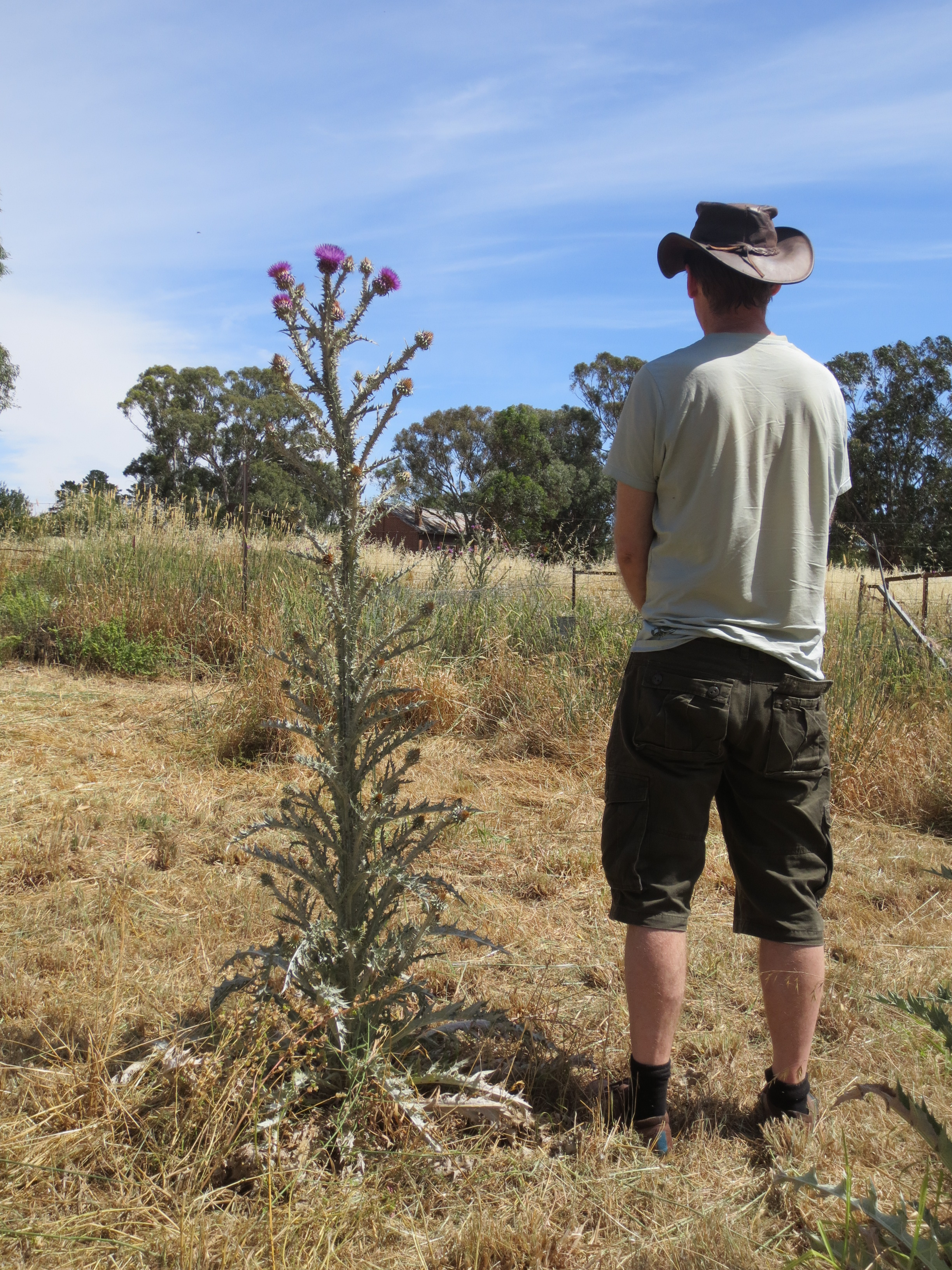
A mature Scotch thistle (1.8 m) at Galong, Australia

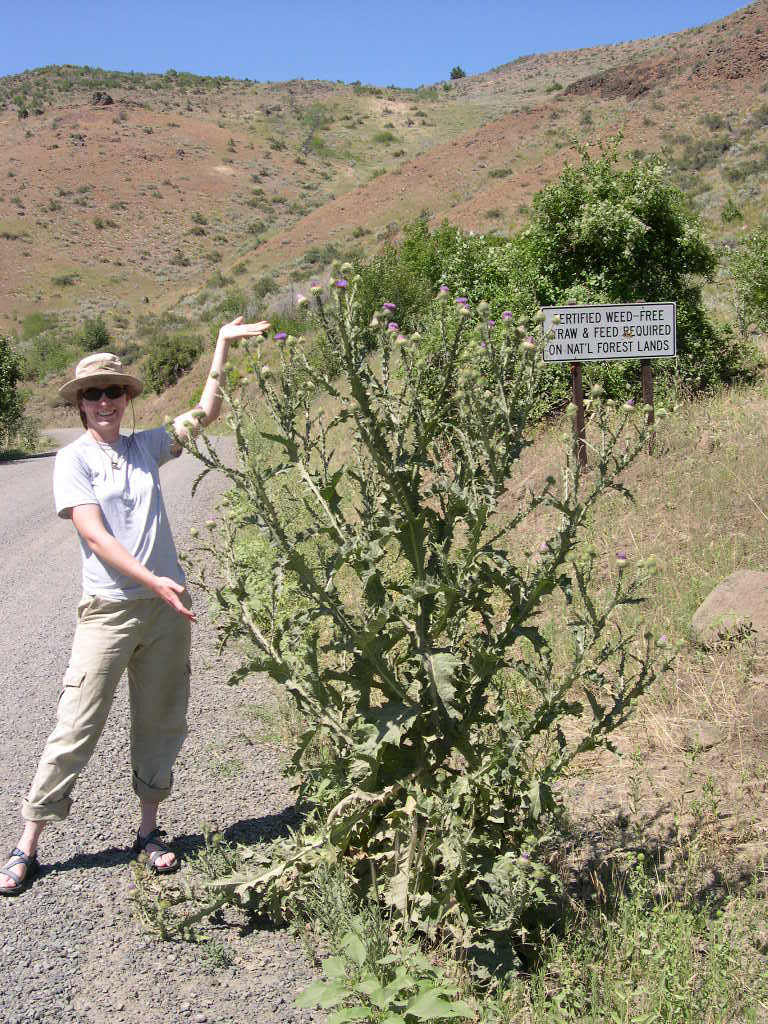
An example of Onopordum acanthium in southwest Idaho, demonstrating the plant's size

In the late 19th century, it was introduced to temperate regions of North America, South America, and Australia as an ornamental plant, and is now considered a major agricultural and wildland noxious weed. It has been recorded from nearly 50 countries. It is difficult to eradicate because of its drought resistance. It can spread rapidly and eventually dense stands prohibit foraging by livestock. Infestations of cotton thistle often start in disturbed areas such as roadways, campsites, burned areas, and ditch banks. The weed adapts best to areas along rivers and streams, but can be a serious problem in pastures, grain fields and range areas. A single plant is imposing enough, but an entire colony can ruin a pasture or destroy a park or campsite, sometimes forming tall, dense, impenetrable stands. This issue is often amplified by the prolific thorns found on this species. Besides creating an impenetrable barrier to humans and animals, the plant nearly eliminates forage use by livestock and some mammal species such as deer and elk.

In the United States, known infestations include most of the Pacific Northwest along with Utah, Colorado, New Mexico, Wyoming, Nebraska, and South Dakota. On western rangeland, infestations directly result in significant economic losses for ranchers. It is also widespread in Australia and New Zealand. In Australia it commonly hybridises with the related invasive Onopordum illyricum.

=== Control ===
Mechanical

Small infestations may be physically removed or cut a few centimetres below the soil surface ensuring that no leaves remain attached to prevent regrowth. Mowing during early flowering will not kill the plant but will reduce seed production. Repeated treatments may be required because populations typically exhibit a wide range of developmental stages among individual plants. Slashing should be done prior to flowering since seed may mature in the seed head after cutting. Plants should not be mowed following seed set, as this increases chances for seed dispersal.

Chemical

Because of their shorter life cycle, cotton thistle plants can be effectively treated with herbicides. All herbicide treatments should be applied at the rosette stage of the plant. Generally, herbicide applications would be in early spring or autumn. One of the primary difficulties in chemical control of cotton thistles is their ability to germinate nearly year round. From autumn to spring a range of plant sizes can be found which may result in variable success from chemical control. Herbicides are very effective on seedlings and young rosettes, but control becomes more variable with increasing plant age. Onopordum spp. seeds may persist for several years in the soil. Buried seed may persist for up to twenty years, and reinfestation is likely without yearly management. Therefore, several years of re-treatment may be necessary. Picloram, dicamba, 2,4-D, dicamba + 2,4,-D, and metsulfuron are effective for controlling cotton thistle. Clopyralid is more selective for controlling plants in the family Asteraceae, but will also injure or kill legumes.

Biological

There are no biological control agents that have been specifically released for cotton thistle control in the United States. A thistle head weevil Rhinocyllus conicus that feeds on Carduus pycnocephalus has also been shown to feed on cotton thistle. This insect was the object of imprudent biological control introduction, and it became an invasive species that has threatened endangered native thistles in North America (Strong 1997). Establishment of this thistle head weevil as a biological control agent for cotton thistle has been unsuccessful in the Pacific Northwest. A thistle crown weevil (Trichosirocalus horridus) that feeds on musk, bull, plumeless, Italian, and creeping thistles will also feed on cotton thistle. In Australia, this insect has been shown to kill cotton thistle rosettes. The related Trichosirocalus briese is also being tested as a control agent. The Australian painted lady butterfly has been known to use this invasive species as a host plant, but the larvae do not do enough damage to the plant for this butterfly to be used as biological control agent.

In Australia, a total of seven insects have been released to control cotton thistle. Two of the seven released insects are weevils, including Larinus latus which feeds on the seeds, and Lixus cardui, which bores in the stems.

Integrated management

A combination of methods (IPM) is often more effective than any single method. An integrated pest management plan deals with prevention as well as control. Eradication of weed species is often not a practical goal, but in many cases reducing infestation to manageable levels is an achievable objective. Seed bank longevity is a major factor in managing cotton thistles. Re-establishing competitive perennial grasses and monitoring infested areas on a yearly basis is critical. Herbicides can successfully be used for reducing thistle populations and giving grasses a competitive advantage, but they cannot be used as a stand-alone solution. These techniques must be linked with good grazing practices in rangeland areas. Otherwise, the thistles will recolonize and rapidly replenish the seed bank to pre-control levels.
