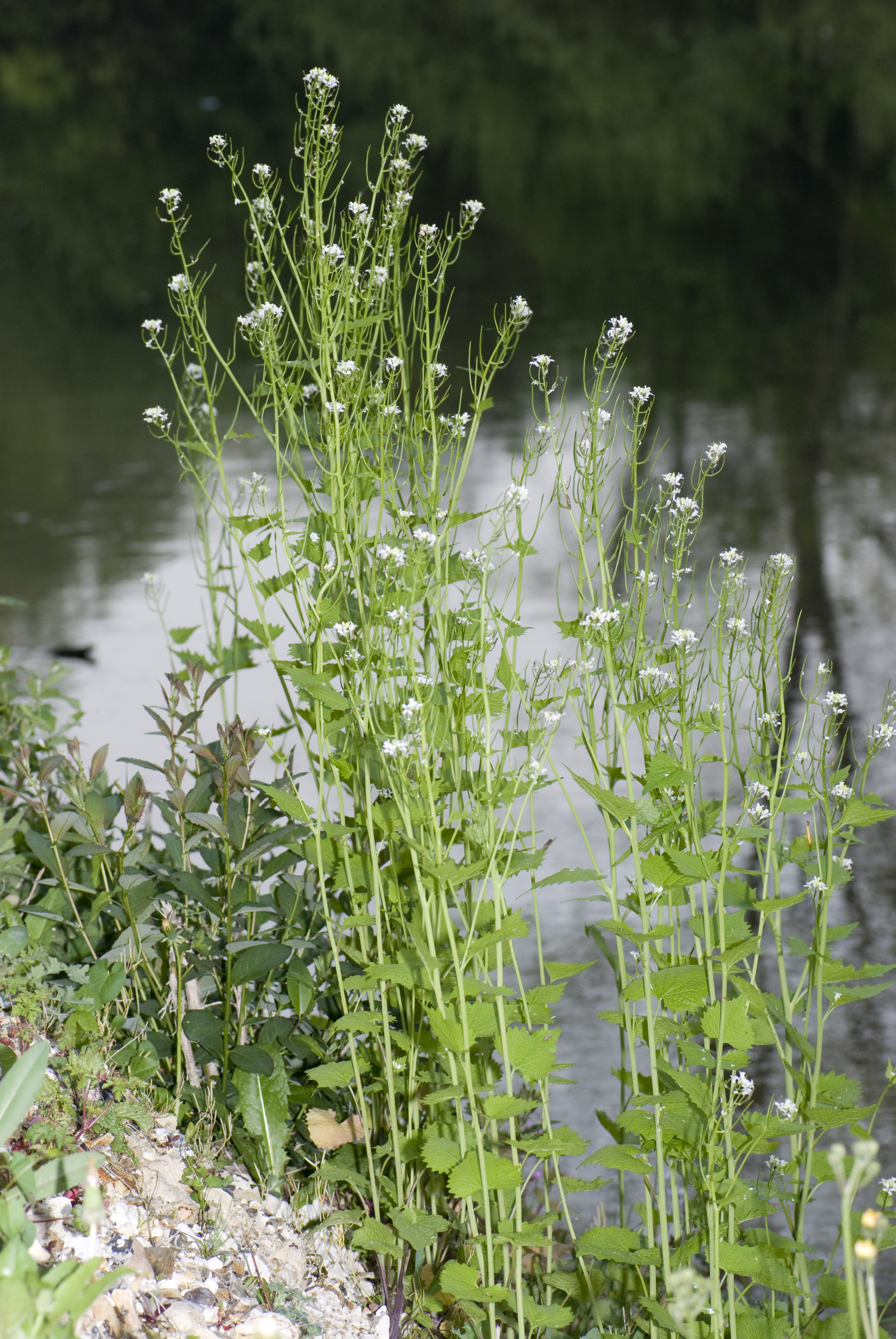
- Alliaria petiolata

Scientific classification
- Kingdom: Plantae
- Clade: Tracheophytes
- Clade: Angiosperms
- Clade: Eudicots
- Clade: Rosids
- Order: Brassicales
- Family: Brassicaceae
- Genus: Alliaria; Heist. ex Fabr.

Synonyms
- Pallavicinia Cocc.; Sisymbrion St.-Lag.

= Alliaria =

Genus of flowering plants in the cabbage family

Alliaria is a genus of flowering plants in the family Brassicaceae.

Species include:

- Alliaria petiolata (M.Bieb.) Cavara & Grande
- Alliaria taurica (Adam) V.I.Dorof.
