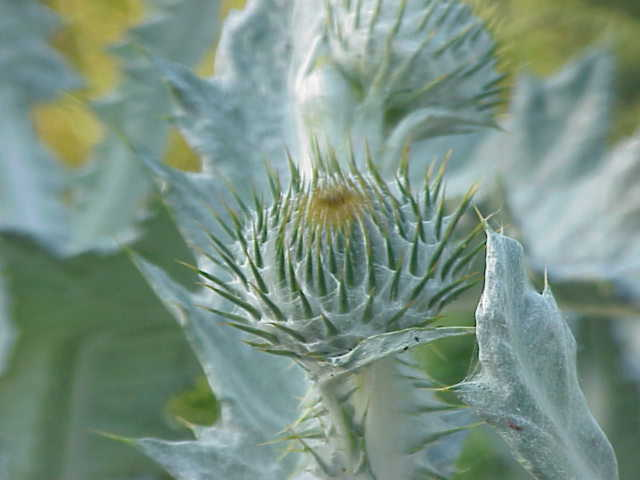
- Onopordum acanthium - young flowering head

Scientific classification
- Kingdom: Plantae
- Clade: Tracheophytes
- Clade: Angiosperms
- Clade: Eudicots
- Clade: Asterids
- Order: Asterales
- Family: Asteraceae
- Subfamily: Carduoideae
- Tribe: Cardueae
- Subtribe: Onopordinae
- Genus: Onopordum; Vaill. ex L.

Type species
- Onopordum acanthium L.

Synonyms
- Acanos Adans.; Acanthium Heist. ex Fabr.

= Onopordum =

Genus of flowering plants

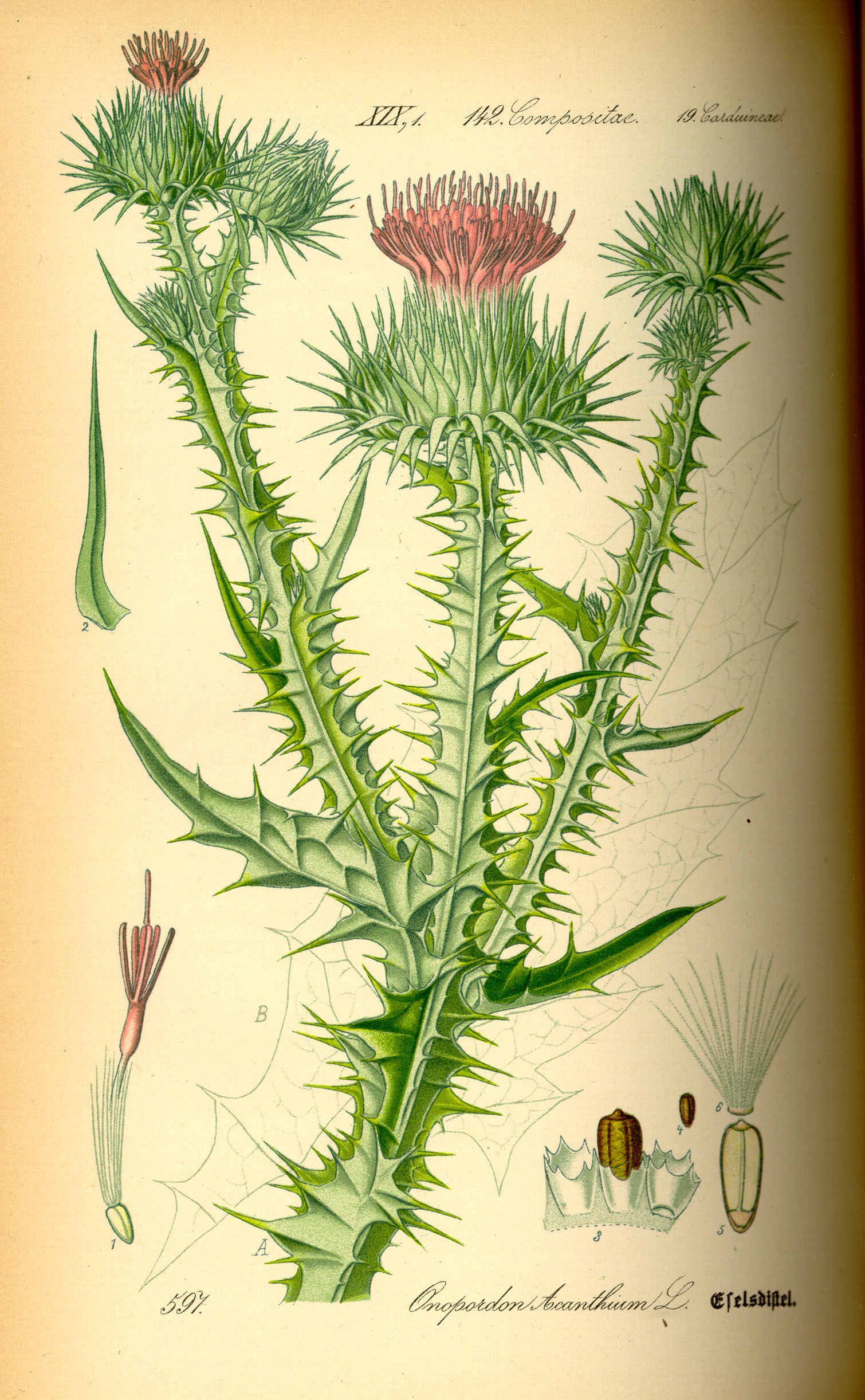
Cotton thistle (Onopordum acanthium) from Thomé Flora von Deutschland, Österreich und der Schweiz 1885

Onopordum, or cottonthistle, is a genus of plants in the tribe Cardueae within the family Asteraceae. They are native to southern Europe, northern Africa, the Canary Islands, the Caucasus, and southwest and central Asia. They are a ruderal species and grow on disturbed land, roadsides, arable land and pastures.

They are biennials (rarely short-lived perennials) with branched, spinose winged stems, growing 0.5–3 m (1 ft 8 in – 9 ft 10 in) tall. In the first season they form a basal rosette of gray-green felted leaves and rarely a few flower heads. In the second season they grow rapidly to their final height, flowering extensively, and then die off after seed maturation.

The leaves are dentate or shallowly lobed to compound with several pinnatifid or deeply cut leaflets, and strongly spiny. The terminal flower head is typical for thistles, a semi-spherical to ovoid capitulum with purple (seldom white or pink) disc florets. There are no ray florets. The receptacle is glabrous with dentate margins. The tube of the corolla is slender, sac-shaped and symmetrical. The anthers have awl-shaped outgrowths on the top. The capitula have several overlapping rows of leathery basal simple linear-lanceolate spines. These are smooth to slightly pubescent.

These plants propagate only by seed. The seed heads mature in mid-summer, releasing their seeds. The fruit is a glabrous achene, 4–6 mm long and with 4-50 ribs. The pappus consists of many rows of simple, fine to minutely rough hairs, united in a circular base.

Onopordum species are used as food plants by the larvae of some Lepidoptera species including Coleophora onopordiella (feeds exclusively on O. acanthium).

In the Greek island of Crete a native species called agriagginara (αγριαγγινάρα) or koufoti (κουφωτοί) has its heads (flowers) and tender leaves eaten raw by the locals.

Species

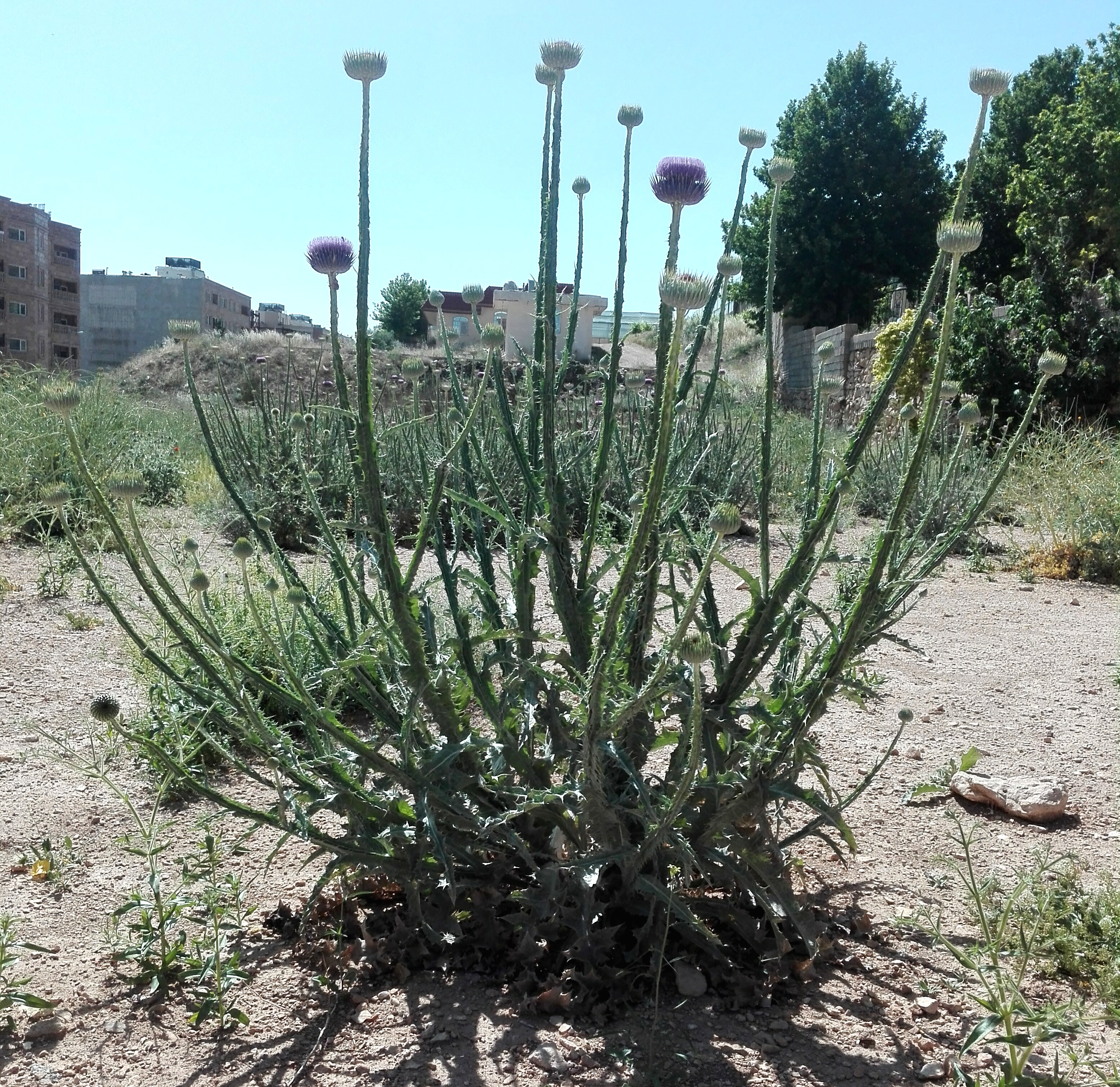
Onopordum leptolepis

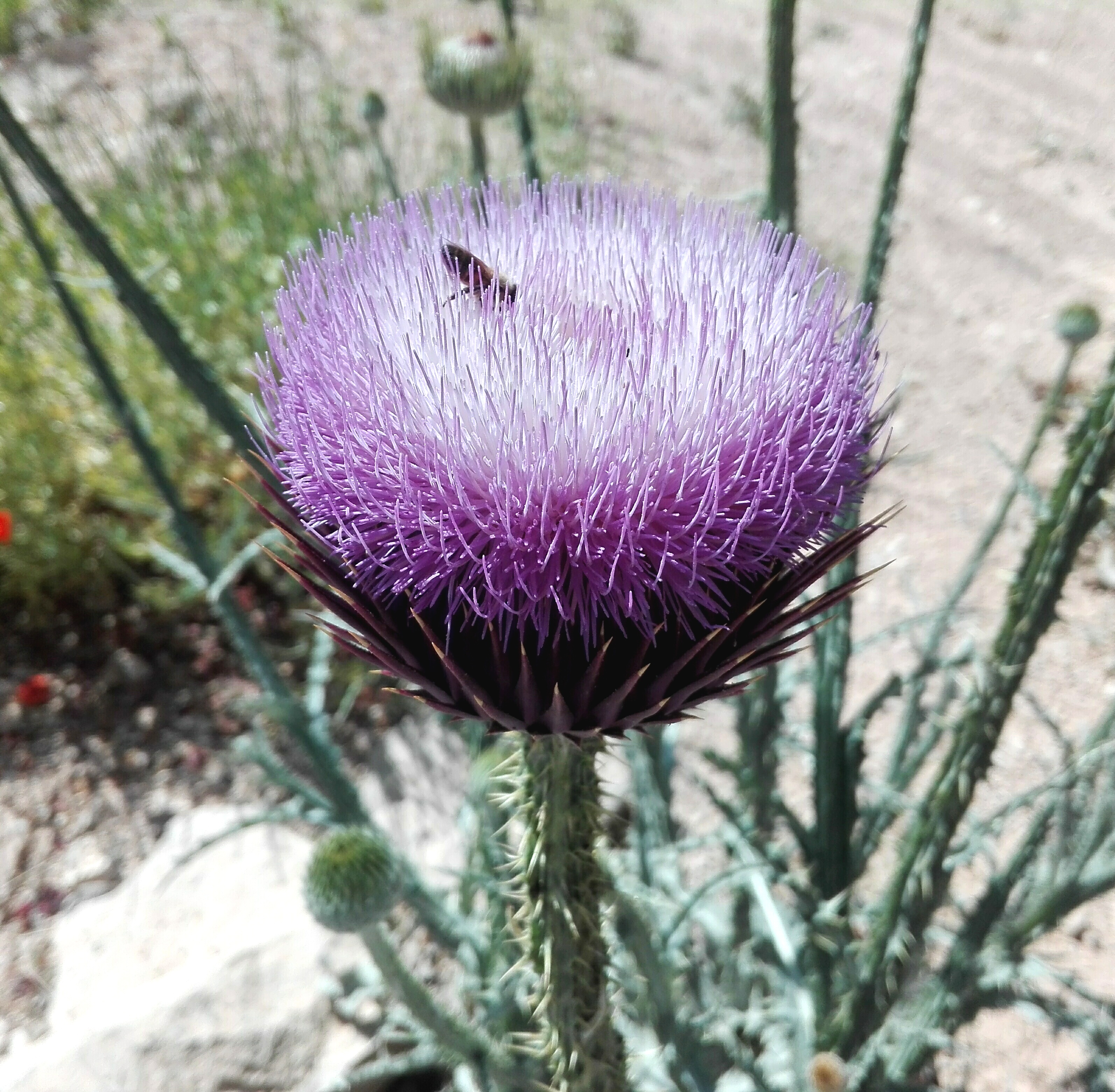
Onopordum leptolepis in bloom

- Onopordum acanthium L. - Cotton thistle, Scotch thistle, Scotch common-thistle, heraldic thistle, woolly thistle
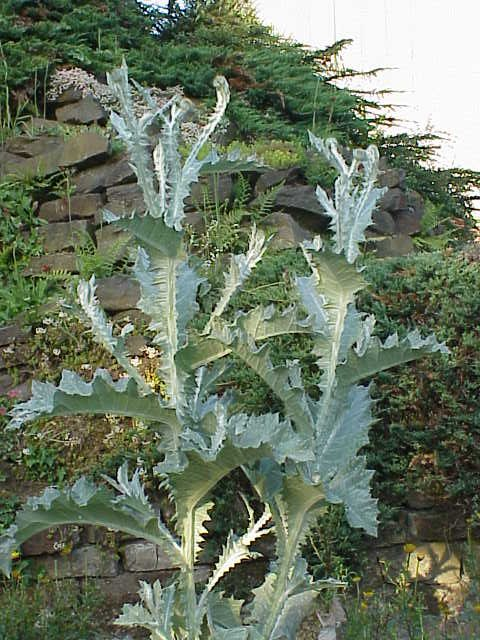
  Onopordum acanthium - habit
  - widespread across Europe and temperate Asia
- Onopordum acaulon L. - Stemless thistle, horse thistle - France, Spain, Algeria, Morocco, Tunisia
- Onopordum alexandrinum Boiss. - Egypt, Palestine, Lebanon, Syria, Israel, Jordan
- Onopordum algeriense (Munby) Pomel - Algeria
- Onopordum ambiguum Fresen. - Egypt, Palestine, Lebanon, Syria, Israel, Jordan
- Onopordum anatolicum (Boiss.) Eig. - Turkey
- Onopordum arenarium M.Hossain & M.A.A.Al-Sarraf - Algeria, Morocco, Tunisia, Libya
- Onopordum armenum Grossh. - Caucasus, Iran, Turkey
- Onopordum blancheanum (Eig) Danin - Israel, Palestine, Jordan, Syria, Lebanon
- Onopordum boissierianum Raab-Straube & Greuter - Turkey
- Onopordum bracteatum Boiss. & Heldr. - Greece, Turkey, Cyprus
- Onopordum canum Eig - Iran, Jordan, Israel, Turkey
- Onopordum carduchorum Bornm. & Beauverd - Lebanon, Syria, Turkey, Iran
- Onopordum carduelium Bolle - Canary Islands
- Onopordum carduiforme Boiss. - Egypt, Palestine, Lebanon, Syria, Israel, Jordan
- Onopordum carmanicum (Bornm.) Bornm. - Iran
- Onopordum caulescens d'Urv. - Greece
- Onopordum cinereum Grossh. - Caucasus, Turkey, Iran, Turkmenistan, Afghanistan
- Onopordum corymbosum Willk. - France, Spain
- Onopordum cynarocephalum Boiss. & Blanche - Palestine, Lebanon, Syria, Israel, Jordan
- Onopordum cyrenaicum Maire & Weiller - Libya
- Onopordum dissectum Murb. - Spain, Morocco
- Onopordum dyris Maire - Morocco
- Onopordum elongatum Lam.
- Onopordum eriocephalum Rouy - France
- Onopordum espinae Coss.
- Onopordum heteracanthum C.A.Mey. - Caucasus, Lebanon, Turkey, Syria, Palestine, Iran, Afghanistan, Saudi Arabia
- Onopordum horridum Viv. - Italy
- Onopordum illyricum L. - Illyrian thistle, Illyrian cottonthistle - Mediterranean
- Onopordum leptolepis DC. - from Palestine to Altay + Xinjiang
- Onopordum macracanthum Schousb. - Spain, Portugal, Italy, Morocco, Algeria
- Onopordum macrocanthum d'Urv.
- Onopordum macrocephalum Eig - Palestine, Lebanon, Syria, Israel, Jordan
- Onopordum mesatlanticum Emb. & Maire - Morocco
- Onopordum micropterum Pau - Spain, Canary Islands
- Onopordum minor L. - Iran
- Onopordum myriacanthum Boiss. - Greece, Turkey, Bulgaria
- Onopordum nervosum Boiss. - Moor's cottonthistle - Spain, Portugal
- Onopordum parnassicum Boiss. & Heldr. - Greece, Turkey
- Onopordum platylepis (Coss. ex Murb.) Murb. - Libya, Tunisia
- Onopordum polycephalum Boiss. - Turkey
- Onopordum prjachinii Tamamsch. - Uzbekistan, Kyrgyzstan, Tajikistan
- Onopordum seravschanicum Tamamsch. - Uzbekistan, Kyrgyzstan, Tajikistan
- Onopordum sibthorpianum Boiss. & Heldr. - Greece, Sicily, Malta, Turkey, North Macedonia, Saudi Arabia
- Onopordum tauricum Willd. - Turkish thistle, Taurian thistle, Taurus cottonthistle, bull cottonthistle - southern + central Europe, Ukraine, Middle East
- Onopordum turcicum Danin - Turkey
- Onopordum wallianum Maire - Morocco

Natural hybrids

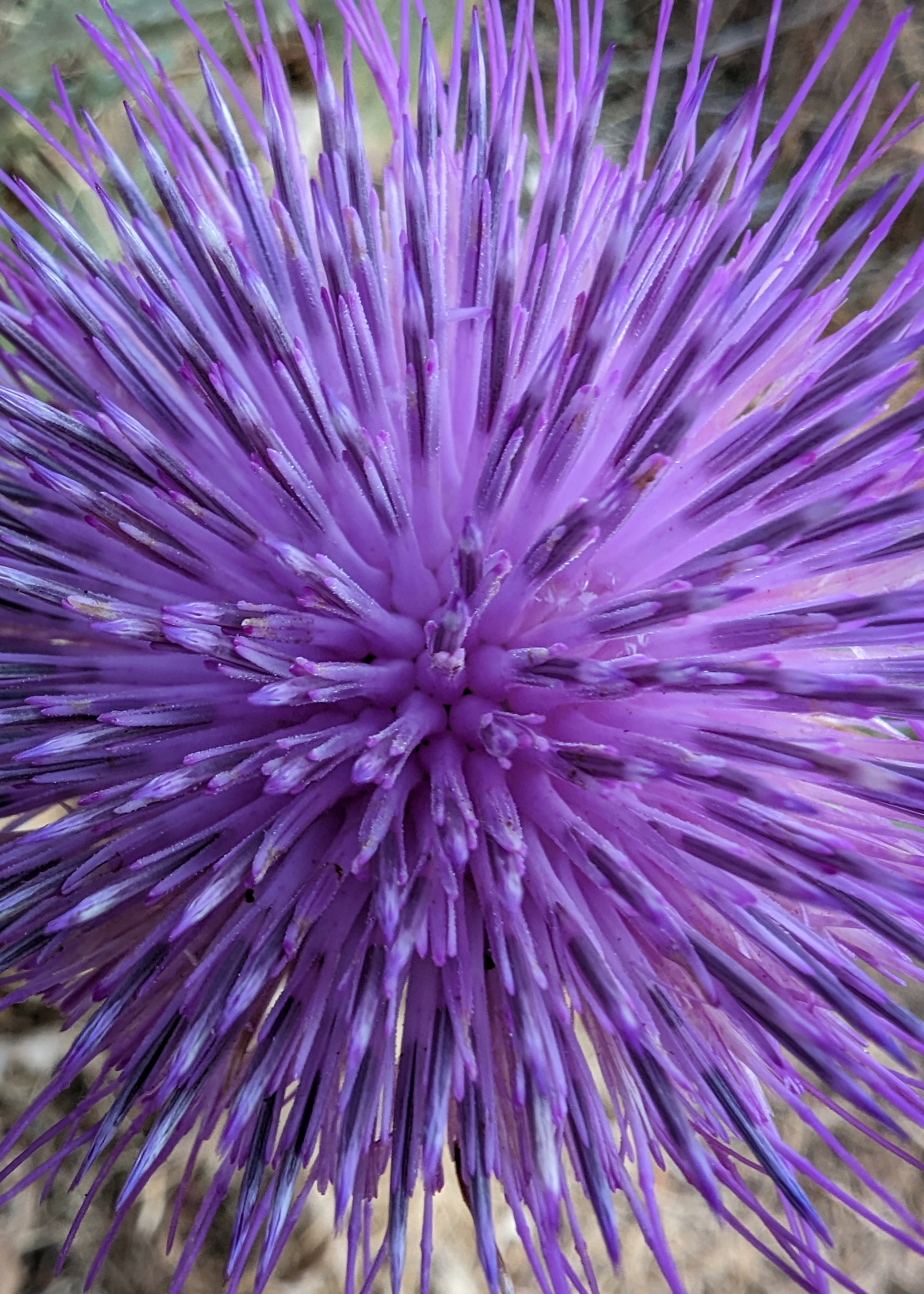
- Onopordum - Tlemcen
  Onopordum × brevicaule (Onopordum acaulon × Onopordum acanthium )
- Onopordum × erectum (Onopordum nervosum ssp. castellanum × Onopordum tauricum ssp. corymbosum )
- Onopordum × macronervosum (Onopordum nervosum × Onopordum macrocanthum)
- Onopordum × onubense (Onopordum dissectum × Onopordum macrocanthum)
- Onopordum × spinosissimum (Onopordum illyricum × Onopordum acanthium)

== Invasive problems ==
Some species of Onopordum have been introduced as ornamental plants in the temperate regions of North America and Australia, where they have become naturalised in the wild. In most of these countries, these thistles are considered noxious weeds, especially in Australia where a biological control program has been set up (using the Rosette Crown Weevil, Trichosirocalus briesei). In North America, there are also Trichosirocalus control programs, but they have proved detrimental to native thistles.
