= Dontostemon =

Scientific classification
- Kingdom: Plantae
- Clade: Tracheophytes
- Clade: Angiosperms
- Clade: Eudicots
- Clade: Rosids
- Order: Brassicales
- Family: Brassicaceae
- Genus: Dontostemon; Andrz. ex C.A.Mey.

Synonyms
- Alaida Dvořák; Andreoskia DC.; Dimorphostemon Kitag.; Hesperidopsis (DC.) Kuntze

Genus of plants

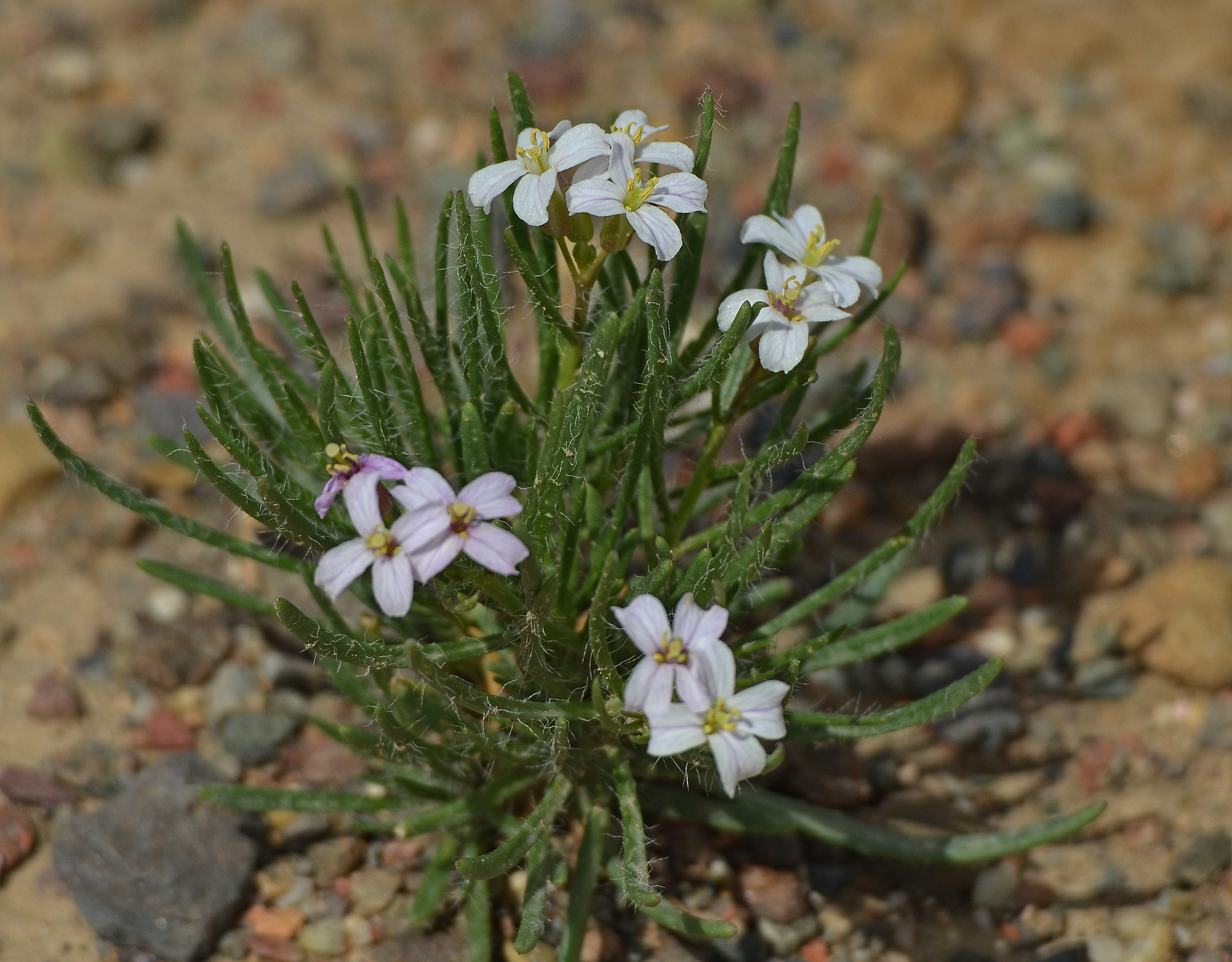

Dontostemon is a genus of flowering plants belonging to the family Brassicaceae. Its native range is Siberia to Temperate Eastern Asia.

== Species ==
12 species are accepted.

- Dontostemon crassifolius (Bunge ex Turcz.) Maxim.
- Dontostemon dentatus (Bunge) C.A.Mey. ex Ledeb.
- Dontostemon elegans Maxim.
- Dontostemon glandulosus (Kar. & Kir.) O.E.Schulz
- Dontostemon gubanovii (D.A.German) D.A.German
- Dontostemon hispidus Maxim.
- Dontostemon integrifolius (L.) Ledeb.
- Dontostemon intermedius Vorosch.
- Dontostemon micranthus C.A.Mey.
- Dontostemon perennis C.A.Mey.
- Dontostemon pinnatifidus (Willd.) Al-Shehbaz & H.Ohba
- Dontostemon senilis Maxim.
