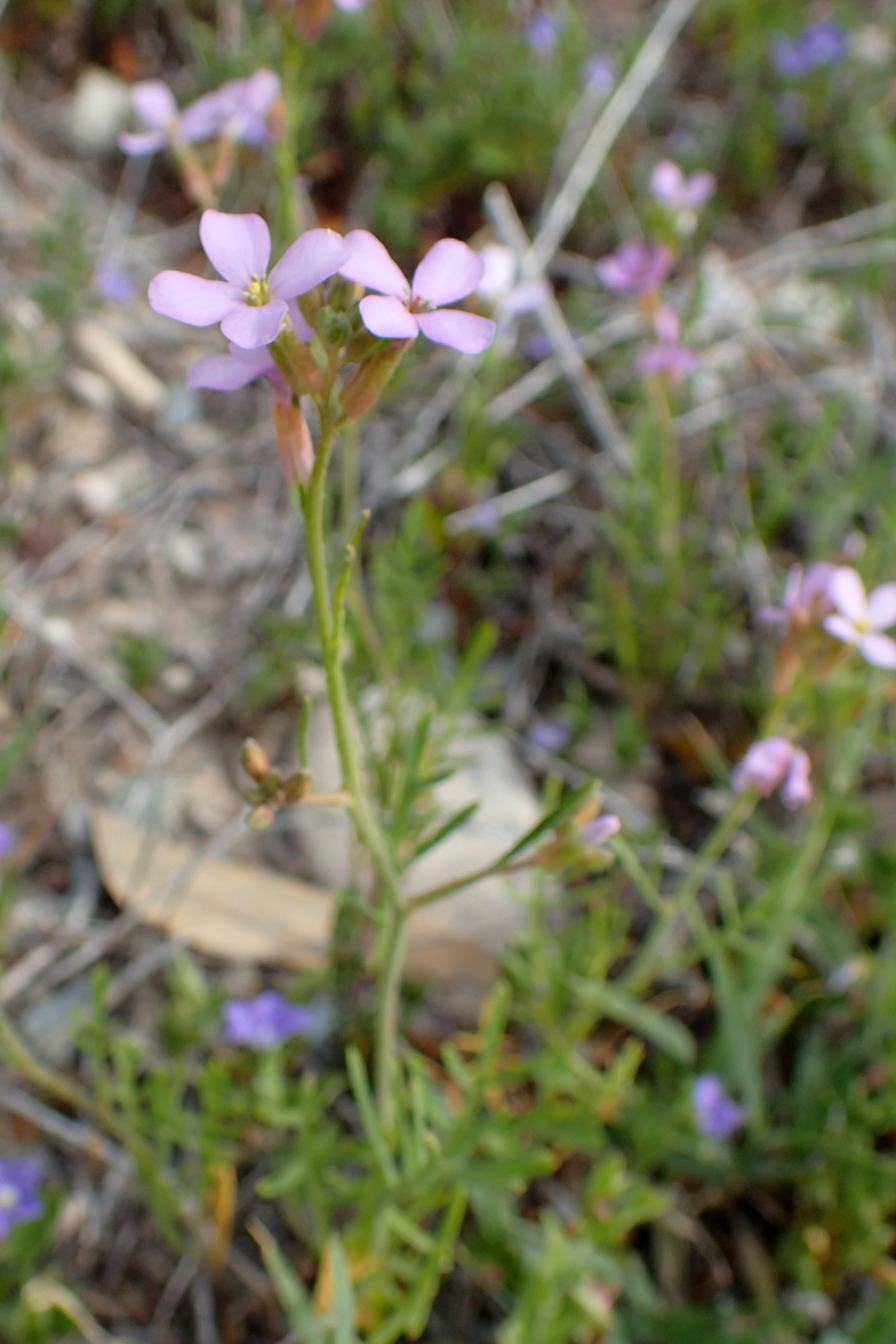
- Erucaria hispanica

Scientific classification
- Kingdom: Plantae
- Clade: Tracheophytes
- Clade: Angiosperms
- Clade: Eudicots
- Clade: Rosids
- Order: Brassicales
- Family: Brassicaceae
- Genus: Erucaria; Gaertn.

Synonyms
- Hussonia Boiss.; Pachila Raf.; Reboudia Coss. & Durieu

= Erucaria =

Genus of flowering plants

Erucaria is a genus of flowering plants of the family Brassicaceae, commonly known as Pink-mustard. Species are native to southern and eastern Mediterranean region, Arabian Peninsula, and Iran.

== Species ==
10 species are accepted.

- Erucaria bornmuelleri O.E. Schulz
- Erucaria cakiloidea (DC.) O.E. Schulz
- Erucaria crassifolia (Forssk.) Delile
- Erucaria erucarioides (Coss. & Durieu) Müll. Berol.
- Erucaria hispanica (L.) Druce
- Erucaria microcarpa Boiss.
- Erucaria oliveri Spreng.
- Erucaria ollivieri Maire
- Erucaria pinnata (Viv.) Täckh. & Boulos
- Erucaria rostrata (Boiss.) A.W. Hill ex Greuter & Burdet
- Erucaria uncata (Boiss.) Asch. & Schweinf.

== See also ==
- Media related to Erucaria at Wikimedia Commons
