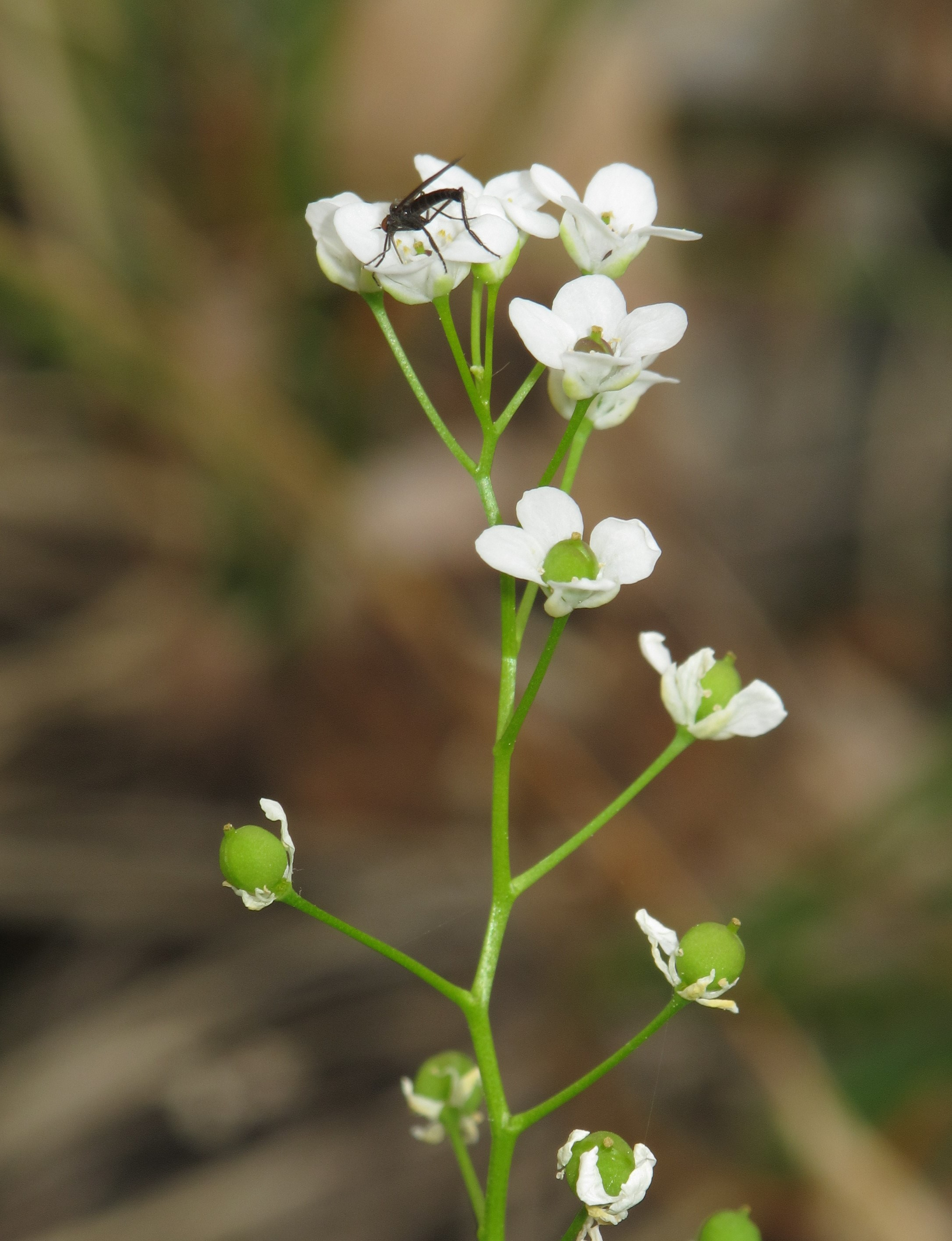
- Kernera saxatilis between Prè and Passo Guil, Italy

Scientific classification
- Kingdom: Plantae
- Clade: Tracheophytes
- Clade: Angiosperms
- Clade: Eudicots
- Clade: Rosids
- Order: Brassicales
- Family: Brassicaceae
- Genus: Kernera; Medik.
- Species: K. saxatilis

Binomial name
- Kernera saxatilis (L.) Sweet

Subspecies
- Kernera saxatilis subsp. boissieri (Reut.) Nyman; Kernera saxatilis subsp. saxatilis

Synonyms
- Gonyclisia Dulac; Alyssum alpinum Scop.; Alyssum rupestre Willd.; Camelina saxatilis (L.) Pers.; Cochlearia saxatilis L. (1753) (basionym); Crucifera kernera E.H.L.Krause; Gonyclisia saxatilis (L.) Dulac; Myagrum saxatile (L.) L.; Nasturtium saxatile (L.) Crantz

= Kernera =

Genus of plants

Kernera is a monotypic genus of flowering plants belonging to the family Brassicaceae. It only contains one species, Kernera saxatilis.

Its native range is eastern, central, and southern Europe. It is found in the countries of Albania, Austria, Bulgaria, Corsica, Czechoslovakia, France, Germany, Greece, Italy, Poland, Romania, Spain, Switzerland and Yugoslavia.

The genus name of Kernera is in honour of Johann Simon von Kerner (1755–1830), a German botanist and botanical illustrator, notable for his illustrations in Hortus sempervirens. The genus was first described and published in Pfl.-Gatt. on page 71 in 1792.

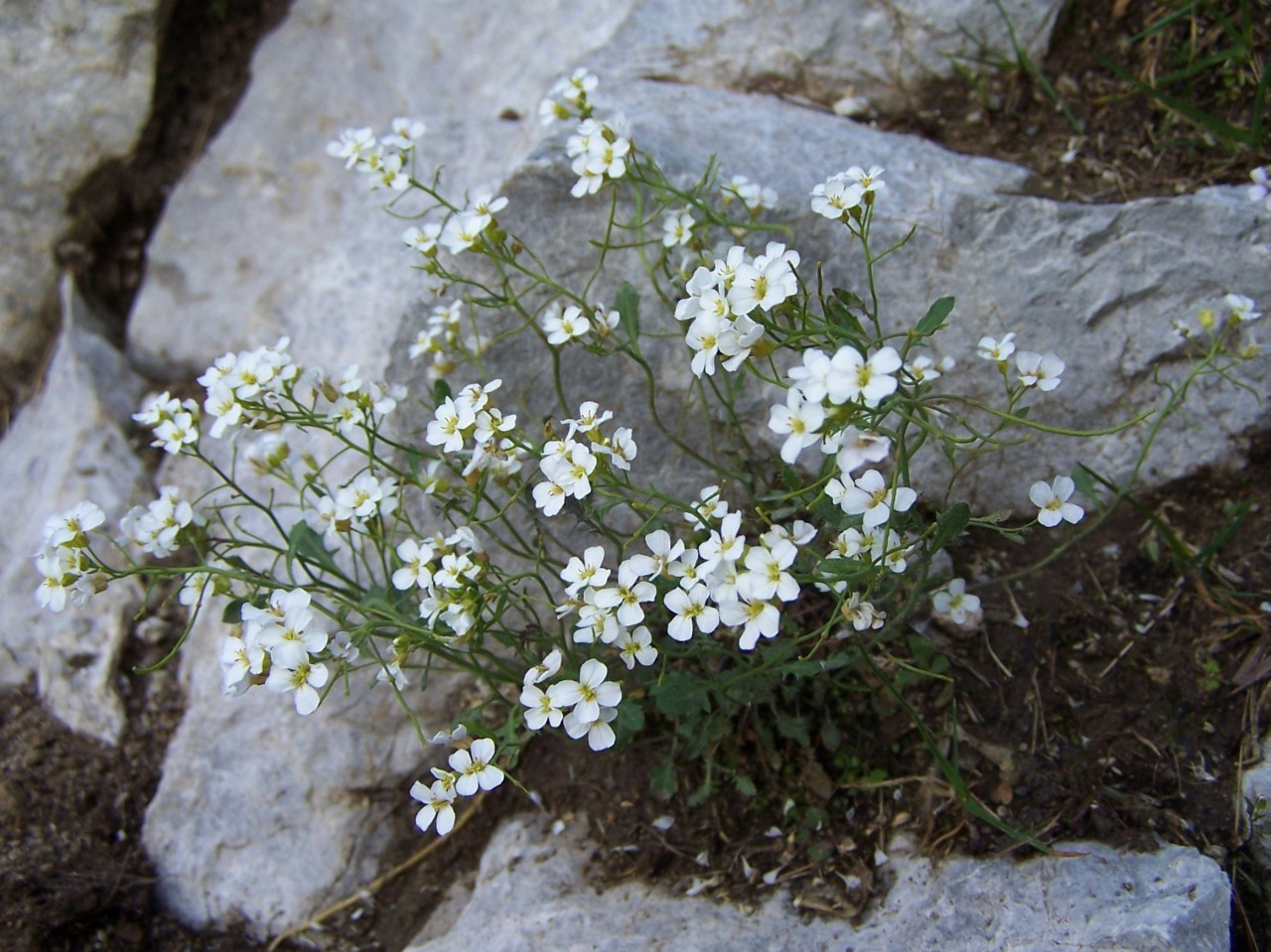
Kernera saxatilis

The species of Kernera saxatilis 7 known synonyms; Alyssum rupestre Willd., Camelina saxatilis (L.) Pers., Cochlearia saxatilis L., Crucifera kernera E.H.L.Krause, Gonyclisia saxatilis (L.) Dulac, Myagrum saxatile (L.) L. and Nasturtium saxatile (L.) Crantz. The Latin specific epithet of saxatilis means rock-dwelling and is derived from the Latin word 'saxum'. The species was first described and published in Hort. Brit. on page 467 in 1826.

It also has a subspecies; Kernera saxatilis subsp. boissieri (Reut.) Nyman, which is native to Spain. It was first published in Consp. Fl. Eur. on page 51 in 1878.
