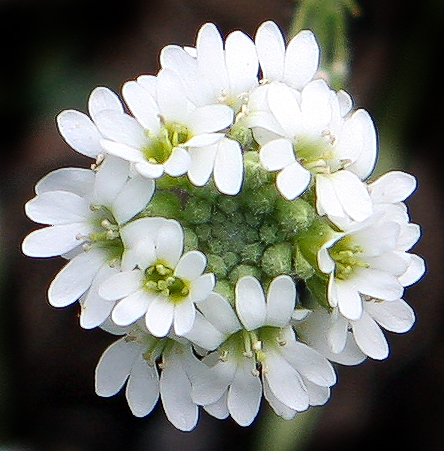

Scientific classification
- Kingdom: Plantae
- Clade: Tracheophytes
- Clade: Angiosperms
- Clade: Eudicots
- Clade: Rosids
- Order: Brassicales
- Family: Brassicaceae
- Genus: Berteroa
- Species: B. incana

Binomial name
- Berteroa incana (L.) DC.

Synonyms
- Alyssum incanum

= Berteroa incana =

Species of plant

Berteroa incana is a species of flowering plant in the mustard family, Brassicaceae. Its common names include hoary alyssum, false hoary madwort, hoary berteroa, and hoary alison. It is a biennial herb native to Eurasia and it has been introduced to western Europe and North America. It is listed as an invasive noxious weed in some areas of United States and Canada

== Description ==
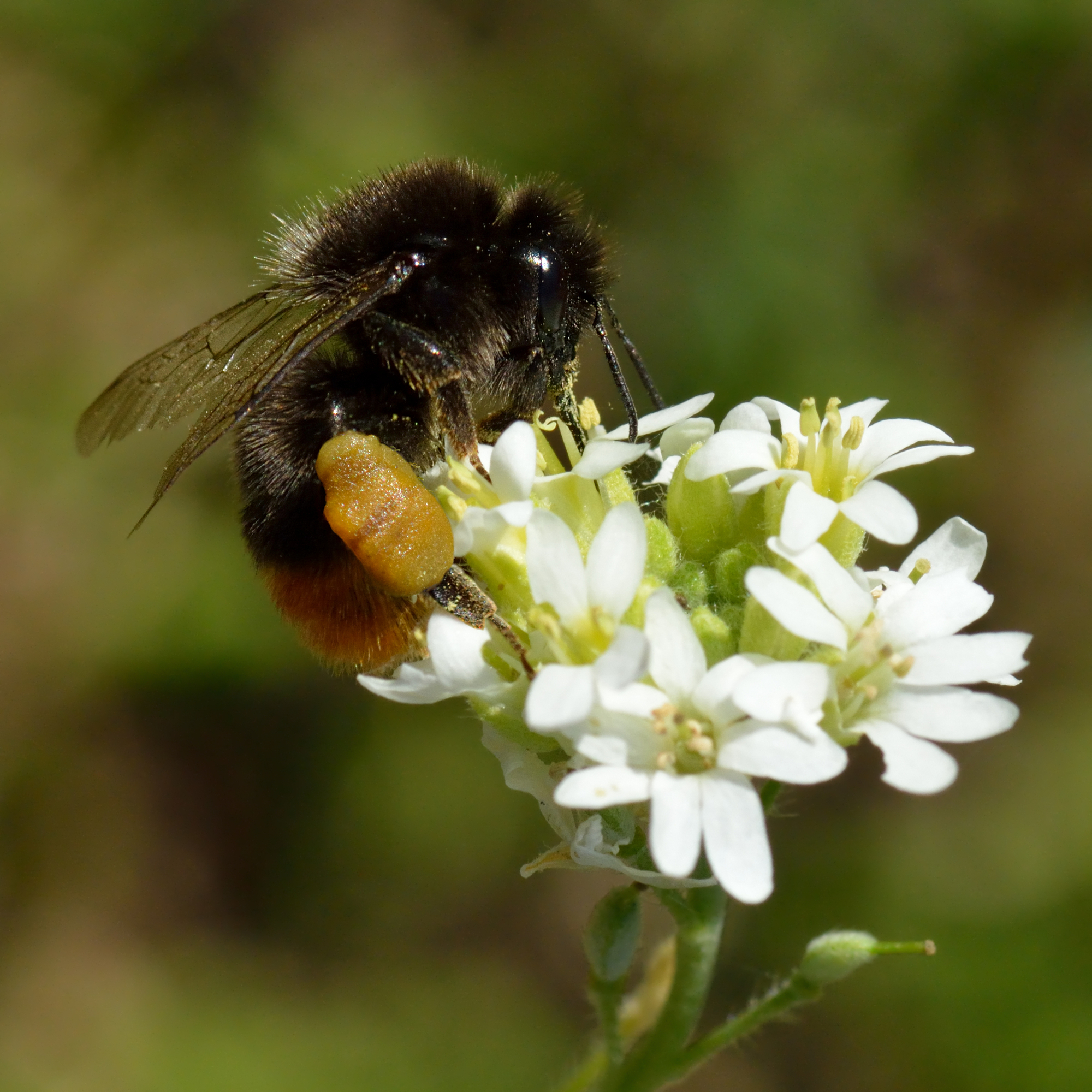
With red-tailed bumblebee (Bombus lapidarius)

Berteroa incana is typically a biennial herbaceous flowering plant, but it also grows as an annual to short-lived perennial. It is hairy, with flattened star-shaped and simple hairs. It produces one or more upright stems usually 30 to 80 centimeters tall, sometimes exceeding one meter. The basal leaves are up to 8 to 10 centimeters long. The leaves are hairy and grayish. The inflorescence is a dense raceme of flowers. The four white petals are roughly half a centimeter long and are tipped with two lobes. The fruit is a hairy silicle up to a centimeter long.

== Uses ==
It is sometimes considered an ornamental plant good for landscaping purposes. It is planted to cover waste ground at mining sites and in urban areas in Europe.

== As a weed ==
B. incana is an invasive species of roadsides, railroads, farms and pastures, riverbanks, vacant lots, overgrazed rangelands, and lawns in the United States. It tolerates cold winters and hot, dry summer conditions. It thrives in poor soils with sand and gravel, more often in alkali soils.

It is a weed of alfalfa and clover forages, reducing their quality with its nutrient-poor herbage. It competes with native flora and reproduces continuously. It may reduce pollinators.

The plant is likely introduced to new areas when its seed is distributed with agricultural crop seeds.

== Toxicity ==
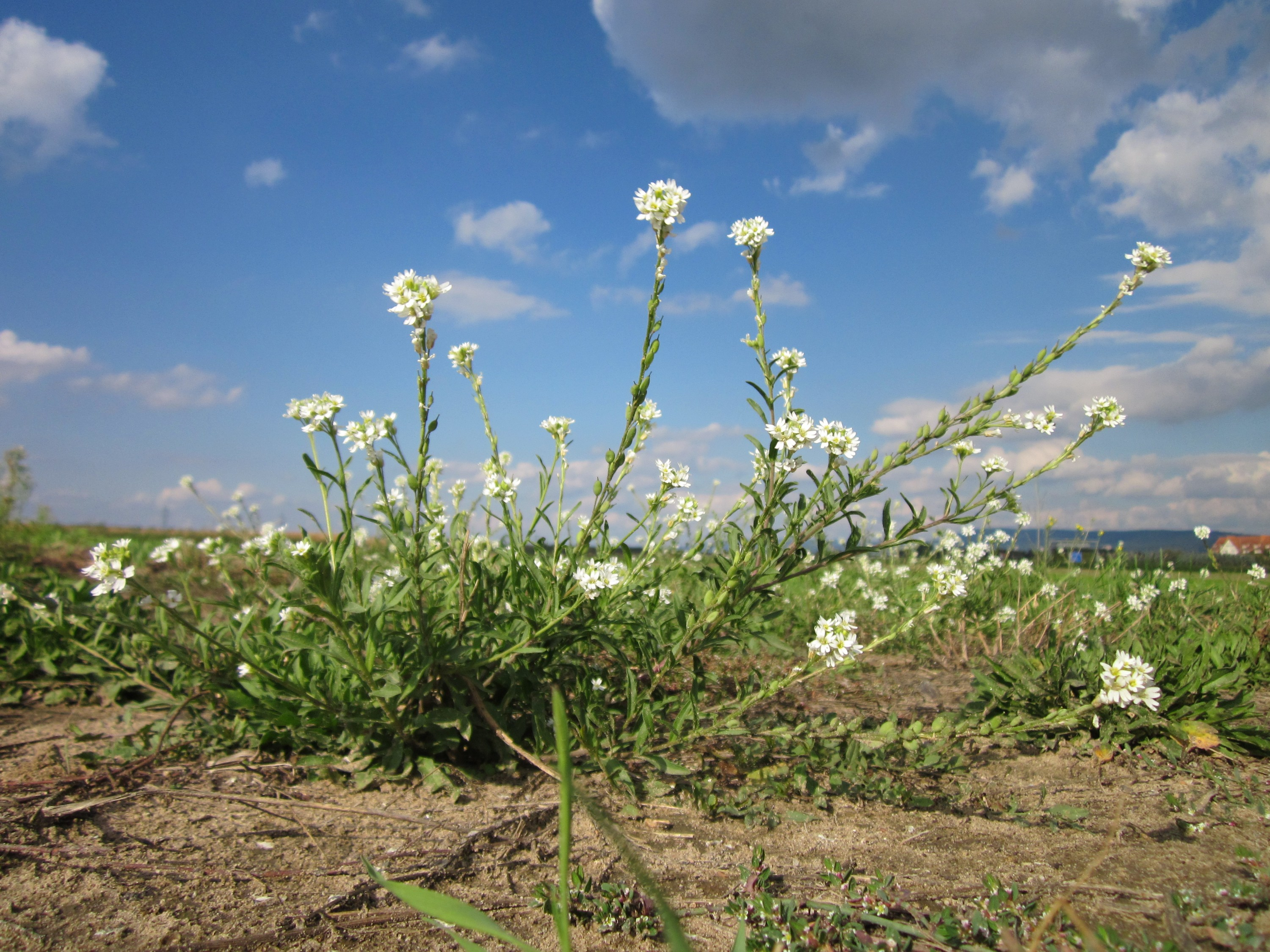
In Germany

The plant is toxic to horses. Green and dry material is sometimes found in alfalfa feed. Signs of poisoning include lameness due to laminitis and leg edema, stiffness, fever, diarrhea, intravascular hemolysis, hypovolemic shock, premature birth, abortion, gut ulceration, edema of the kidneys, pulmonary edema, and calcium crystals in the urine. It can be fatal, but most horses survive with treatment. The toxic compound is not known.
