= Neotorularia =

Scientific classification
- Kingdom: Plantae
- Clade: Tracheophytes
- Clade: Angiosperms
- Clade: Eudicots
- Clade: Rosids
- Order: Brassicales
- Family: Brassicaceae
- Genus: Neotorularia; Hedge & J.Léonard

Genus of flowering plants

Neotorularia is a genus of flowering plants belonging to the family Brassicaceae.

Its native range is Western and South Mediterranean to Mongolia and Arabian Peninsula.

Species:

- Neotorularia aculeolata (Boiss.) Hedge & J.Léonard
- Neotorularia brevipes (Kar. & Kir.) Hedge & J.Léonard
- Neotorularia contortuplicata (Stephan ex Willd.) Hedge & J.Léonard
- Neotorularia dentata (Freyn & Sint.) Hedge & J.Léonard
- Neotorularia eldarica (Grossh.) V.E.Avet.
- Neotorularia grubovii (Botsch.) Botsch.
- Neotorularia rossica (O.E.Schulz) Hedge & J.Léonard
- Neotorularia tetracmoides (Boiss. & Hausskn.) Hedge & J.Léonard
- Neotorularia torulosa (Desf.) Hedge & J.Léonard

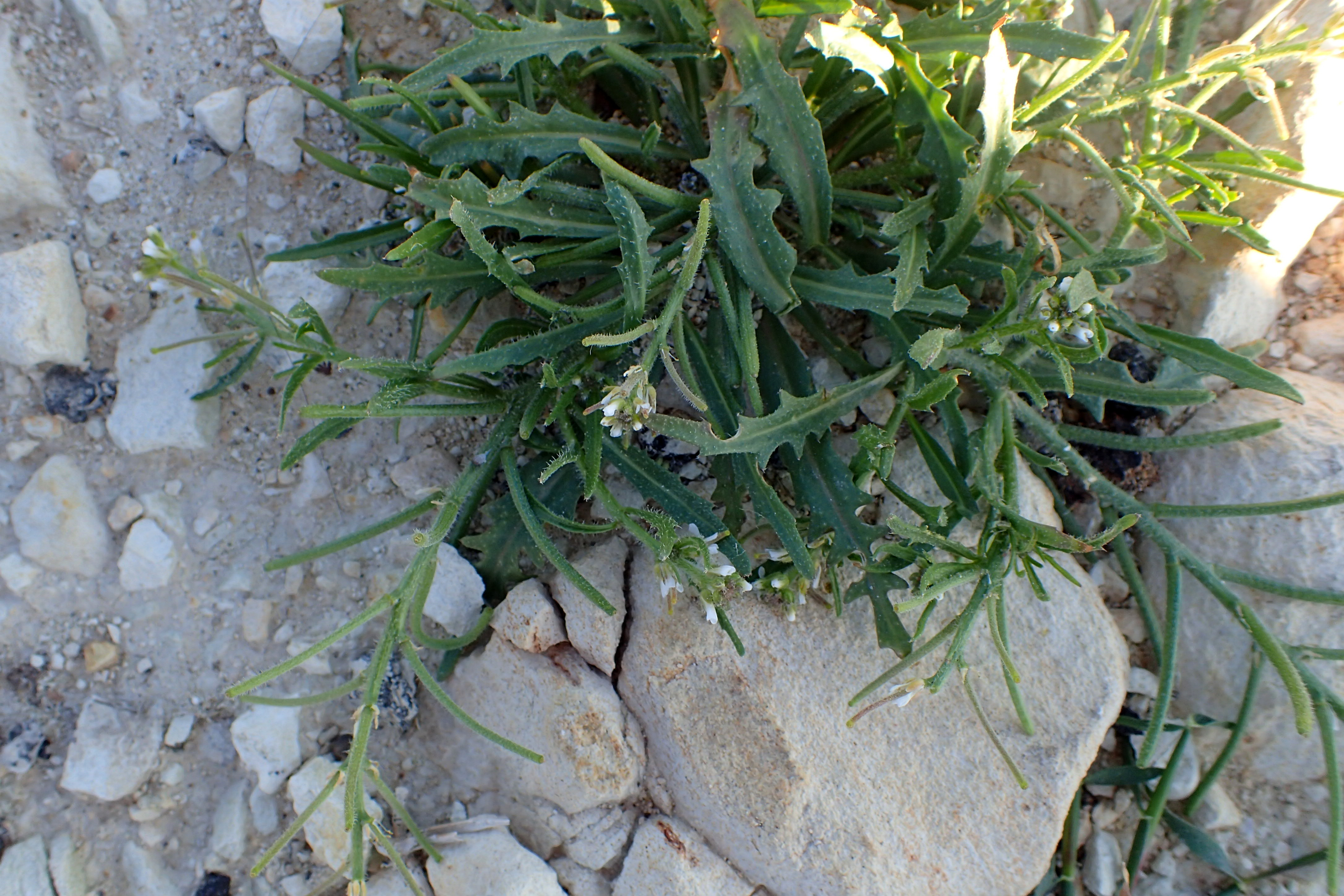
Neotorularia torulosa
