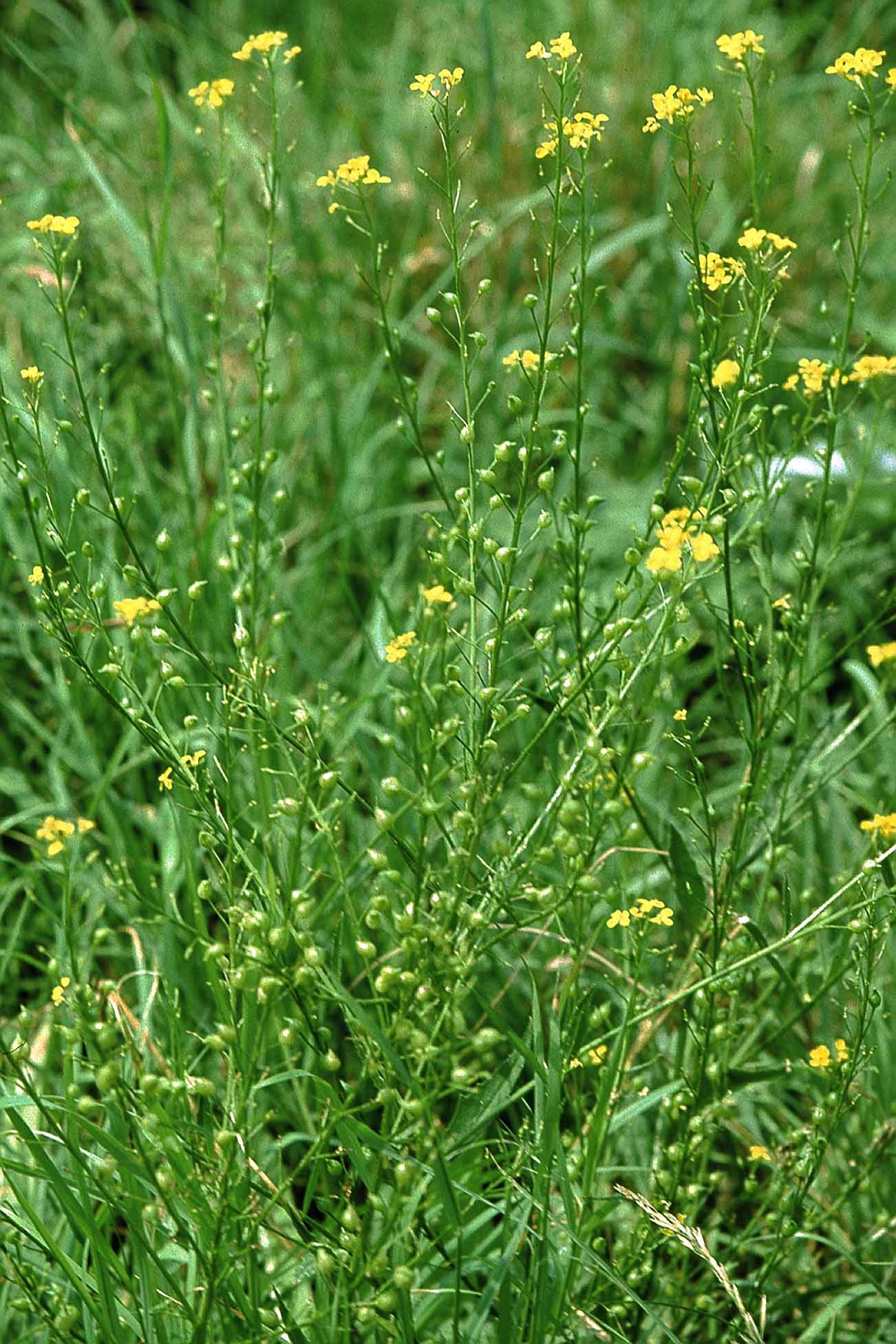
- Bunias orientalis

Scientific classification
- Kingdom: Plantae
- Clade: Tracheophytes
- Clade: Angiosperms
- Clade: Eudicots
- Clade: Rosids
- Order: Brassicales
- Family: Brassicaceae
- Genus: Bunias; L.

Species
- Bunias cochlearioides Murray; Bunias erucago L.; Bunias orientalis L.

Synonyms
- Erucago Mill.; Laelia Adans.; Leiocarpaea (C.A.Mey.) D.A.German & Al-Shehbaz

= Bunias =

Genus of flowering plants

Bunias is a genus of flowering plants in the cabbage family Brassicaceae. The genus includes three accepted species which range from the Mediterranean region to central and Eastern Europe, Western Asia, Siberia, and northern China.

- Bunias cochlearioides Murray
- Bunias erucago L. – crested warty cabbage, corn rocket
- Bunias orientalis L. – Turkish rocket, hill mustard, Turkish warty cabbage, warty cabbage
