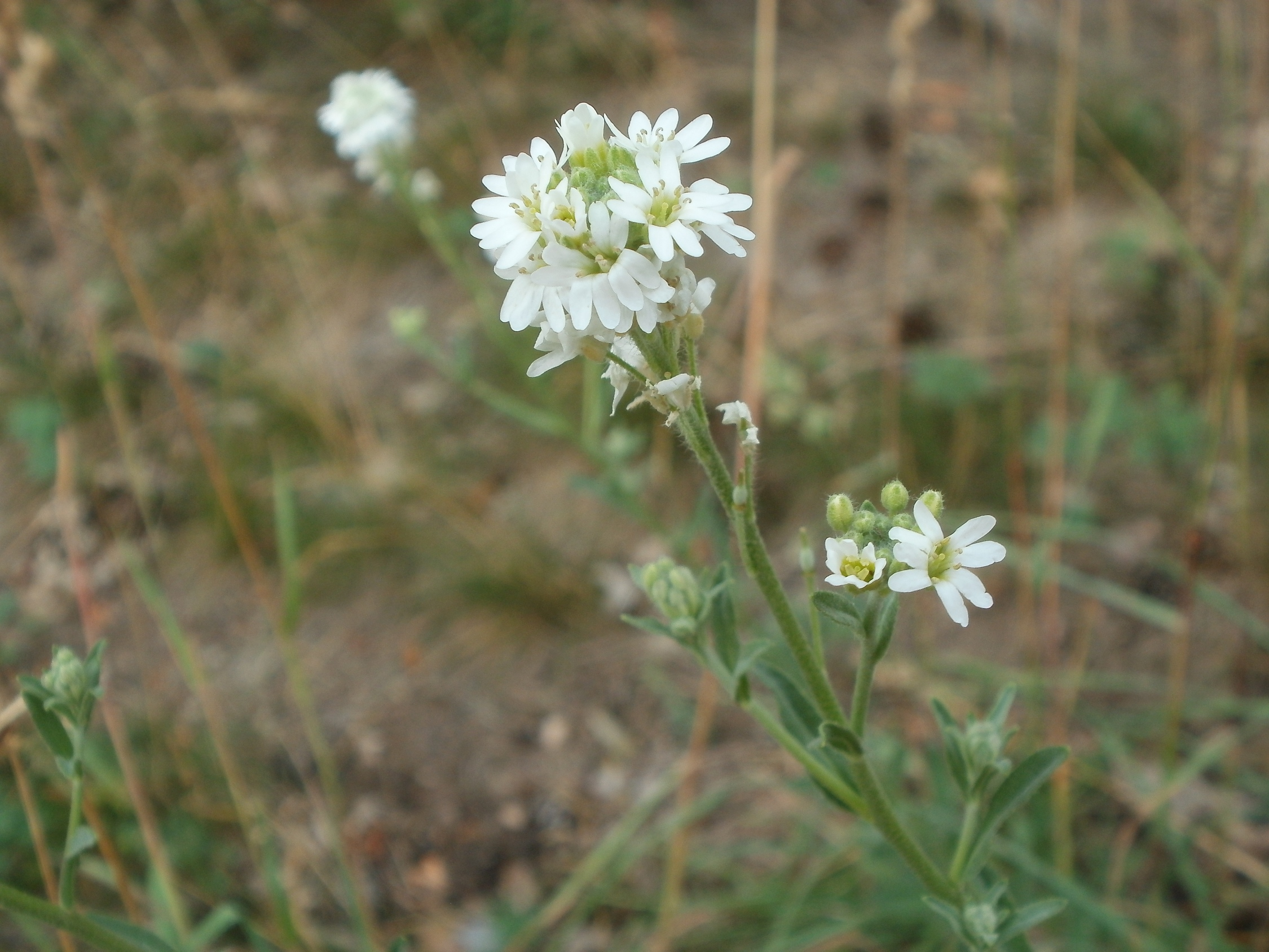
- Berteroa incana

Scientific classification
- Kingdom: Plantae
- Clade: Tracheophytes
- Clade: Angiosperms
- Clade: Eudicots
- Clade: Rosids
- Order: Brassicales
- Family: Brassicaceae
- Genus: Berteroa; DC. (1821)

Species
- 6; see text

Synonyms
- Myopteron Spreng. (1831)

= Berteroa =

Genus of flowering plants in the crucifer family Brassicaceae

Berteroa, the false madworts, is a genus of flowering plants of the family Brassicaceae, native to temperate Eurasia. Its best known member is the weedy invasive hoary alyssum, Berteroa incana.

== Species ==
Six species are accepted.

- Berteroa gintlii Rohlena
- Berteroa incana (L.) DC.
- Berteroa mutabilis (Vent.) DC.
- Berteroa obliqua (Sm.) DC.
- Berteroa orbiculata DC.
- Berteroa physocarpa Yüzb. & Al-Shehbaz
