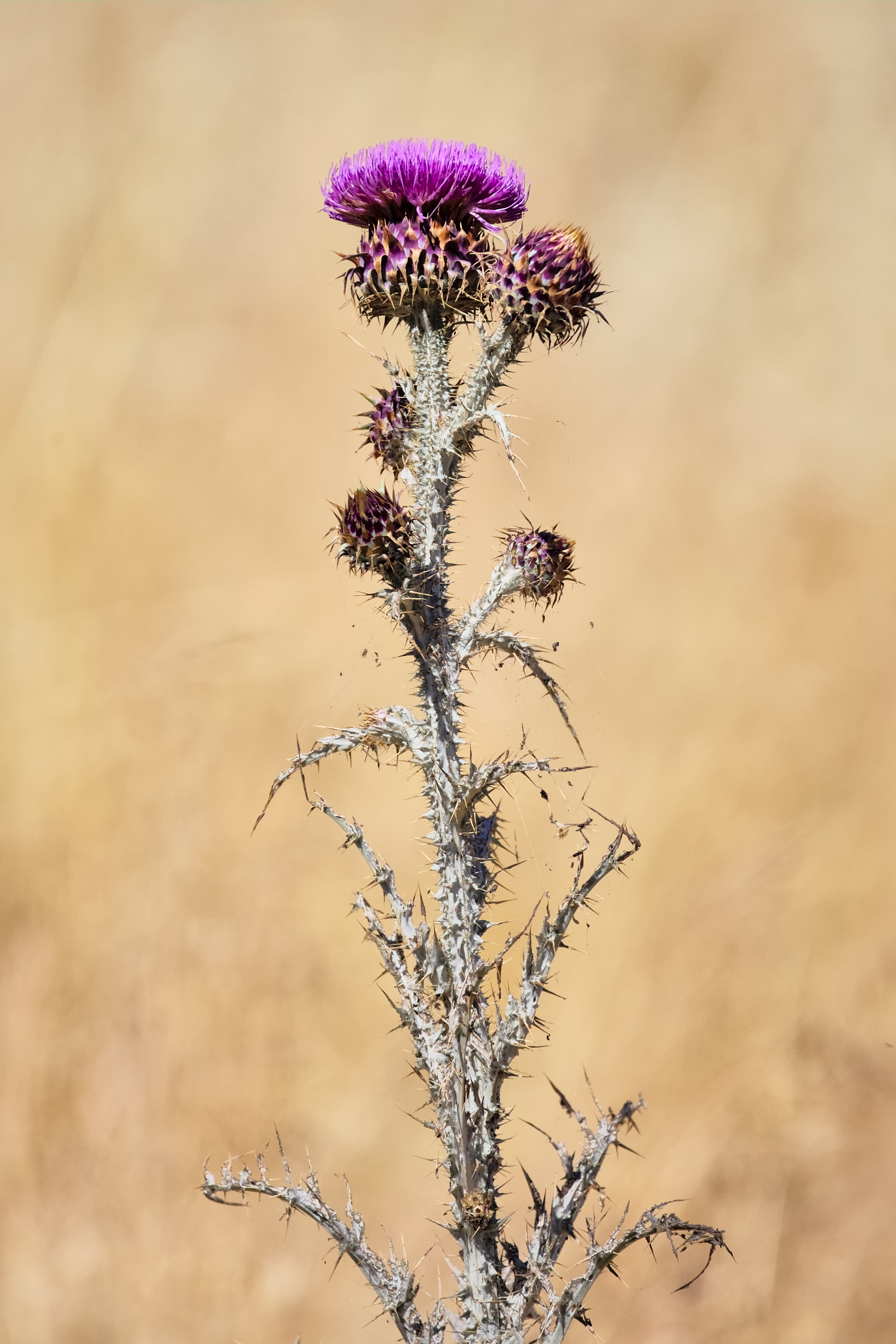

Scientific classification
- Kingdom: Plantae
- Clade: Tracheophytes
- Clade: Angiosperms
- Clade: Eudicots
- Clade: Asterids
- Order: Asterales
- Family: Asteraceae
- Genus: Onopordum
- Species: O. illyricum

Binomial name
- Onopordum illyricum L.

= Onopordum illyricum =

Species of flowering plant

Onopordum illyricum is a species of thistle known by the common name Illyrian thistle, or Illyrian cottonthistle. It is native to southwestern Europe, but has been introduced into Australia and California, where it has become a noxious weed.

The plant is a biennial herb producing an erect, branching, winged, spiny stem known to exceed two meters in maximum height. The spiny leaves may be up to 50 centimetres (20 in) long and are divided into deep toothed lobes. The inflorescence bears several large flower heads each up to 7 centimetres (3 in) wide. They are lined with spiny, woolly to cobwebby phyllaries and bear many narrow glandular purple flowers each about 3 centimetres (1.2 in) long. The fruit is a cylindrical achene 4 or 5 millimetres (0.16 or 0.20 in) long topped with a white pappus 1 centimetre (0.39 in) in length.
