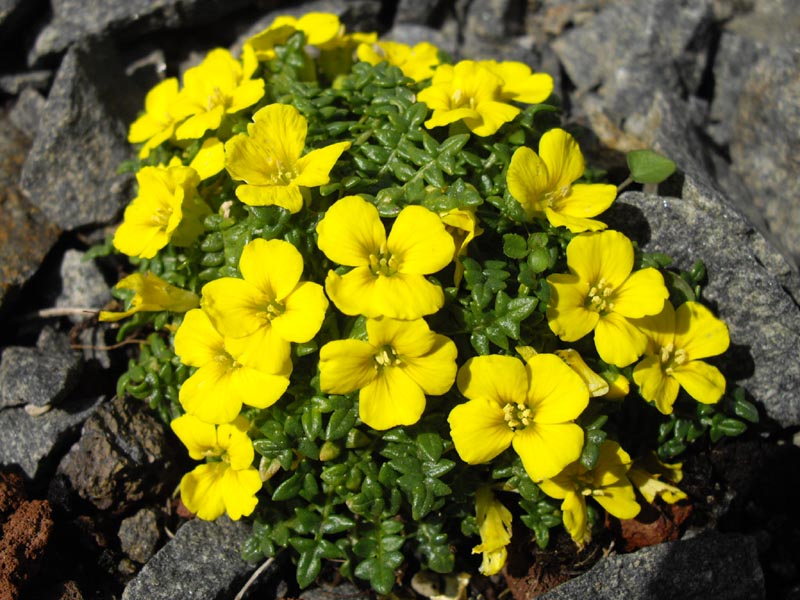
- Morisia monanthos

Scientific classification
- Kingdom: Plantae
- Clade: Tracheophytes
- Clade: Angiosperms
- Clade: Eudicots
- Clade: Rosids
- Order: Brassicales
- Family: Brassicaceae
- Genus: Morisia; J.Gay
- Species: M. monanthos

Binomial name
- Morisia monanthos (Viv.) Asch.

Synonyms
- Morisea DC.; Monanthemum Scheele; Erucaria hypogaea Viv.; Monanthemum acaule Scheele; Morisia acaulis J.Gay; Morisia hypogaea (Viv.) J.Gay ex Colla; Rapistrum hypogaeum (Viv.) Duby; Sisymbrium monanthos Viv. (1824) (basionym)

= Morisia =

Genus of flowering plants

Morisia is a monotypic genus of ornamental plant in the family Brassicaceae. Its only species is Morisia monanthos, also called M. hypogaea. It is a perennial native to the Mediterranean islands of Corsica and Sardinia.
