= List of Erysiphe species =

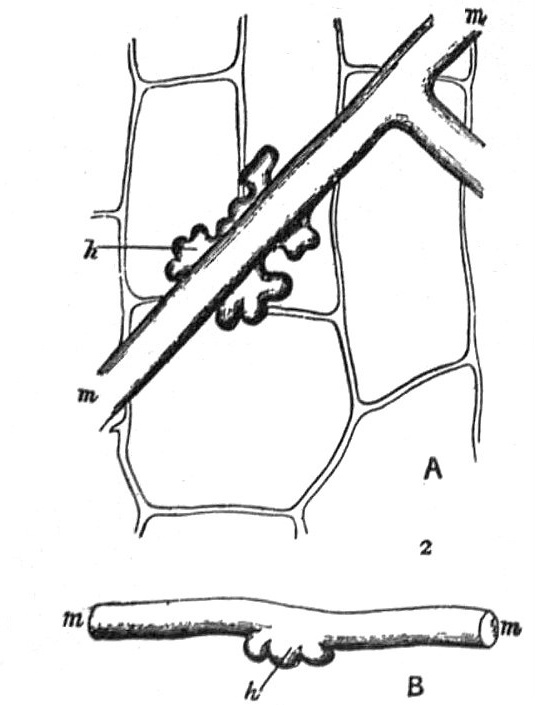
1911 illustration of Erysiphe from Encyclopædia Britannica. A and B, mycelium (m), with haustoria (h)

This is a list of the fungus species in the genus Erysiphe, which consists of plant pathogens in the family Erysiphaceae. As of 20 September 2023, the GBIF lists up to 462 species, 478 are accepted by Wijayawardene et al. (2020), while Species Fungorum lists about 432 species. This list with authors and dates is based on the Species Fungorum list.

== A ==
- Erysiphe abbreviata (Peck) U. Braun & S. Takam. (2000)
- Erysiphe abeliae R.Y. Zheng & G.Q. Chen (1980)
- Erysiphe abeliana Bolay & U. Braun (2021)
- Erysiphe abeliicola U. Braun & S. Takam. (2000)
- Erysiphe abelmoschicola Tanda (2003)
- Erysiphe acaenae (Havryl.) U. Braun & Havryl. (2012)
- Erysiphe acantholimonis J.G. Song, B. Xu & H.D. Shin (2016)
- Erysiphe acerina U. Braun & S. Takam. (2000)
- Erysiphe aceriphylli Golovin & Bunkina (1961)
- Erysiphe actinidiae (Hara) U. Braun & S. Takam. (2000)
- Erysiphe actinostemmatis U. Braun (1983)
- Erysiphe adunca (Wallr.) Fr. (1829)
- Erysiphe aesculi-sylvaticae Andr. Paul & M. Bradshaw, 2025
- Erysiphe afrormosiae (Piroz.) U. Braun & S. Takam. (2000)
- Erysiphe akebiae (Sawada) U. Braun & S. Takam. (2000)
- Erysiphe alangii (T. Xu) U. Braun & S. Takam. (2000)
- Erysiphe alangiicola U. Braun (2012)
- Erysiphe alashanensis T.Z. Liu & Y.Z. Shang (2008)
- Erysiphe alchorneae (R.Y. Zheng & G.Q. Chen) U. Braun & S. Takam. (2000)
- Erysiphe aleuritis (C.T. Wei) U. Braun & S. Takam. (2000)
- Erysiphe allophyli U. Braun & S. Takam. (2000)
- Erysiphe alphitoides (Griffon & Maubl.) U. Braun & S. Takam. (2000)
- Erysiphe altingiae Z.X. Chen & Y.J. Yao (1993)
- Erysiphe alvimii (A.C. Dianese & Dianese) U. Braun & S. Takam. (2000)
- Erysiphe amphicarpaeae R.Y. Zheng & G.Q. Chen (1981)
- Erysiphe angusiana (Piroz.) U. Braun & S. Takam. (2000)
- Erysiphe aphananthes (Jacz.) U. Braun (2012)
- Erysiphe aquilegiae DC. (1815)
- Erysiphe arcuata U. Braun, V.P. Heluta & S. Takam. (2007)
- Erysiphe aristolochiae (Y.N. Yu) U. Braun & S. Takam. (2000)
- Erysiphe asclepiadis U. Braun & V. Kumm. (2009)
- Erysiphe asiatica Meeboon, Divarangk. & S. Takam. (2011)
- Erysiphe aspera (Doidge) U. Braun & S. Takam. (2000)
- Erysiphe astragali DC. (1815)
- Erysiphe atraphaxis (Golovin) U. Braun & S. Takam. (2000)
- Erysiphe aucubae S. Takam. & Siahaan (2016)
- Erysiphe aurea R.Y. Zheng & G.Q. Chen (1980)
- Erysiphe australiana (McAlpine) U. Braun & S. Takam. (2000)
- Erysiphe australis (Speg.) U. Braun & S. Takam. (2000)
- Erysiphe azaleae (U. Braun) U. Braun & S. Takam. (2000)
- Erysiphe azanzae (Yadav) U. Braun (2012)
- Erysiphe azerbaijanica Abasova, Aghayeva & S. Takam. (2018)

== B ==
- Erysiphe baeumleri (Magnus) U. Braun & S. Takam. (2000)
- Erysiphe balbisiae Havryl. (1996)
- Erysiphe baliensis Siahaan & S. Takam. (2015)
- Erysiphe baptisiae U. Braun & J. Kruse (2010)
- Erysiphe baptisiicola U. Braun (2010)
- Erysiphe begoniae R.Y. Zheng & G.Q. Chen (1980)
- Erysiphe begoniicola U. Braun & S. Takam. (2000)
- Erysiphe benzoin (F.L. Tai) U. Braun & S. Takam. (2000)
- Erysiphe berberidicola (F.L. Tai) U. Braun & S. Takam. (2000)
- Erysiphe berberidis DC. (1805)
- Erysiphe berchemiae (Sawada) U. Braun & S. Takam. (2000)
- Erysiphe betae (Vaňha) Weltzien (1963)
- Erysiphe betulina U. Braun & S. Takam. (2000)
- Erysiphe bifurcata (Homma) U. Braun & S. Takam. (2000)
- Erysiphe bischofiae (C.T. Wei) U. Braun & S. Takam. (2000)
- Erysiphe blasti (F.L. Tai) U. Braun & S. Takam. (2000)
- Erysiphe boehmeriae Meeboon & S. Takam. (2017)
- Erysiphe brachystegiae Doidge (1948)
- Erysiphe braunii Y. Nomura (1997)
- Erysiphe bremeri U. Braun (1982)
- Erysiphe buckleyae (Y. Nomura & Tanda) U. Braun & S. Takam. (2000)
- Erysiphe buhrii U. Braun (1978)
- Erysiphe bulbosa (U. Braun) U. Braun & S. Takam. (2000)
- Erysiphe bulbouncinula U. Braun & S. Takam. (2000)
- Erysiphe bunkiniana U. Braun (1980)

== C ==
- Erysiphe calocladophora (G.F. Atk.) U. Braun & S. Takam. (2000)
- Erysiphe caprifoliacearum (U. Braun) U. Braun & S. Takam. (2000)
- Erysiphe caricae U. Braun & Bolay (2005)
- Erysiphe caricae-papayae Meeboon & S. Takam. (2017)
- Erysiphe carpinicola (Hara) U. Braun & S. Takam. (2000)
- Erysiphe carpini-cordatae (Tanda & Y. Nomura) U. Braun (2012)
- Erysiphe carpini-laxiflorae U. Braun, V.P. Heluta & S. Takam. (2007)
- Erysiphe carpophila Syd. (1924)
- Erysiphe caryae (U. Braun) U. Braun & S. Takam. (2000)
- Erysiphe castaneae U. Braun (2003)
- Erysiphe castaneigena U. Braun & Cunningt. (2006)
- Erysiphe catalpae Simonyan (1984)
- Erysiphe caucasica Simonyan (1985)
- Erysiphe caulicola (Petr.) U. Braun (1982)
- Erysiphe cedrelae (F.L. Tai) U. Braun & S. Takam. (2000)
- Erysiphe ceibae (Viégas) U. Braun & S. Takam. (2000)
- Erysiphe celastri (Y.N. Yu & Y.Q. Lai) U. Braun & S. Takam. (2000)
- Erysiphe celosiae Tanda (2000)
- Erysiphe celtidis (Schwarzman & Kusnezowa) U. Braun & S. Takam. (2000)
- Erysiphe cercidis T. Xu (1983)
- Erysiphe chifengensis T.Z. Liu & U. Braun (2006)
- Erysiphe chionanthi (R.Y. Zheng & G.Q. Chen) U. Braun & S. Takam. (2000)
- Erysiphe chloranthi (Golovin & Bunkina) U. Braun (1983)
- Erysiphe chouardii (Durrieu) U. Braun & S. Takam. (2000)
- Erysiphe cinnamomicola U. Braun & S. Takam. (2000)
- Erysiphe circaeae L. Junell (1967)
- Erysiphe cladrastidis (Jacz.) U. Braun & S. Takam. (2000)
- Erysiphe clandestina Biv. (1815)
- Erysiphe clavulata (R.Y. Zheng & G.Q. Chen) U. Braun (2012)
- Erysiphe cleomes R.X. Li & D.S. Wang (1990)
- Erysiphe clethrae (U. Braun) U. Braun & S. Takam. (2000)
- Erysiphe clintonii (Peck) U. Braun & S. Takam. (2000)
- Erysiphe clintoniopsis (R.Y. Zheng & G.Q. Chen) U. Braun & S. Takam. (2000)
- Erysiphe coluteae (Kom.) U. Braun & S. Takam. (2000)
- Erysiphe combreticola (Doidge) U. Braun & S. Takam. (2000)
- Erysiphe convolvuli DC. (1805)
- Erysiphe coriariae (Y. Nomura) U. Braun & S. Takam. (2000)
- Erysiphe coriariicola R.Y. Zheng & G.Q. Chen (1981)
- Erysiphe coriariigena U. Braun & S. Takam. (2006)
- Erysiphe cornicola Meeboon & S. Takam. (2017)
- Erysiphe cornutae M. Bradshaw (2021)
- Erysiphe corylacearum U. Braun & S. Takam. (2002)
- Erysiphe coryli-americanae M. Bradshaw (2021)
- Erysiphe corylicola U. Braun & S. Takam. (2000)
- Erysiphe corylopsidis Shiroya & S. Takam. (2009)
- Erysiphe cotini (Eliade) U. Braun & S. Takam. (2000)
- Erysiphe couchii (Solheim, Eboh & McHenry) U. Braun (2012)
- Erysiphe crataegi (Bunkina) U. Braun & S. Takam. (2000)
- Erysiphe crispula (U. Braun) U. Braun & S. Takam. (2000)
- Erysiphe crotonis (Piroz.) U. Braun & S. Takam. (2000)
- Erysiphe cruciferarum Opiz ex L. Junell (1967)
- Erysiphe cyclobalanopsidis (K.C. Kuo, W.H. Hsieh & L.S. Leu) U. Braun (2009)

== D ==
- Erysiphe dabashanensis (R.Y. Zheng & G.Q. Chen) U. Braun & S. Takam. (2000)
- Erysiphe decaisneae (F.L. Tai) U. Braun & S. Takam. (2000)
- Erysiphe delavayi (Pat.) U. Braun & S. Takam. (2000)
- Erysiphe densa Berk. (1855)
- Erysiphe desmanthi (U. Braun) U. Braun (2010)
- Erysiphe desmodii Y.S. Paul & J.N. Kapoor (1984)
- Erysiphe deutziae (Bunkina) U. Braun & S. Takam. (2000)
- Erysiphe deutziicola P.L. Qiu, S.Y. Liu & Y. Li (2019)
- Erysiphe diervillae Miyabe ex U. Braun (1983)
- Erysiphe diffusa (Cooke & Peck) U. Braun & S. Takam. (2000)
- Erysiphe digitata (A.J. Inman & U. Braun) A.J. Inman & U. Braun (2000)
- Erysiphe dipeltae (Y.N. Yu & Y.Q. Lai) U. Braun & S. Takam. (2000)
- Erysiphe discariae (Havryl.) U. Braun & S. Takam. (2000)
- Erysiphe divaricata (Wallr.) Schltdl. (1824)
- Erysiphe doidgeae U. Braun (2012)
- Erysiphe dudkae Gelyuta (2014)

== E ==
- Erysiphe ehrenbergii (Lév.) U. Braun, M. Bradshaw & S. Takam. (2020)
- Erysiphe ehretiae (Keissl.) U. Braun & S. Takam. (2000)
- Erysiphe elevata (Burrill) U. Braun & S. Takam. (2000)
- Erysiphe ellisii (U. Braun) U. Braun & S. Takam. (2000)
- Erysiphe embeliae (R.K. Verma, Chand & Kamal) U. Braun & S. Takam. (2000)
- Erysiphe epigena S. Takam. & U. Braun (2007)
- Erysiphe epimedii (F.L. Tai) R.Y. Zheng & G.Q. Chen (1980)
- Erysiphe erineophila (Peck) U. Braun & S. Takam. (2000)
- Erysiphe erlangshanensis (Y.N. Yu) U. Braun & S. Takam. (2000)
- Erysiphe eschscholziae Pastirč. & Jankovics (2016)
- Erysiphe euodiae (R.Y. Zheng & G.Q. Chen) U. Braun & S. Takam. (2000)
- Erysiphe euonymi DC. (1815)
- Erysiphe euonymicola U. Braun (2012)
- Erysiphe euonymi-japonici U. Braun & S. Takam. (2000)
- Erysiphe euphorbiacearum (R.Y. Zheng & G.Q. Chen) U. Braun & S. Takam. (2000)
- Erysiphe euphorbiae Peck (1874)
- Erysiphe euphorbiicola U. Braun & S. Takam. (2000)
- Erysiphe euscaphidis (D.Z. Xie) U. Braun & S. Takam. (2000)
- Erysiphe exochordae (Q.X. Lu & G.Z. Lu) U. Braun & S. Takam. (2000)
- Erysiphe extensa (Cooke & Peck) U. Braun & S. Takam. (2000)

== F ==
- Erysiphe fagacearum R.Y. Zheng & G.Q. Chen (1981)
- Erysiphe fallax C. Blomq., Roon.-Lath. & Fern.-Pavía (2017)
- Erysiphe farmanii U. Braun & Y.S. Paul (2009)
- Erysiphe fernandoae Meeboon, Divarangk. & S. Takam. (2013)
- Erysiphe ficicola U. Braun & Y.S. Paul (2009)
- Erysiphe fimbriata S. Takam., Masuya & Y. Nomura (2008)
- Erysiphe firmianae R.Y. Zheng & G.Q. Chen (1981)
- Erysiphe flacourtiae (N. Ahmad, A.K. Sarbhoy & Kamal) U. Braun & S. Takam. (2000)
- Erysiphe flexibilis M. Bradshaw, U. Braun & S. Takam. (2020)
- Erysiphe flexuosa (Peck) U. Braun & S. Takam. (2000)
- Erysiphe floccosa (Piroz.) U. Braun & S. Takam. (2000)
- Erysiphe fragilis (R.Y. Zheng & G.Q. Chen) U. Braun & S. Takam. (2000)
- Erysiphe fraxinea Y. Yamaguchi, Meeboon & S. Takam. (2021)
- Erysiphe fraxinicola U. Braun & S. Takam. (2000)
- Erysiphe friesii (Lév.) U. Braun & S. Takam. (2000)

== G ==
- Erysiphe galegae U. Braun (2012)
- Erysiphe garhwalensis N. Ahmad, D.K. Agarwal & A.K. Sarbhoy (1987)
- Erysiphe garugae (Bappamm., Hosag. & Udaiyan) U. Braun (2012)
- Erysiphe geniculata (W.R. Gerard) U. Braun & S. Takam. (2000)
- Erysiphe geraniacearum U. Braun & Simonyan (1984)
- Erysiphe golovinii (Domashova) U. Braun & S. Takam. (2000)
- Erysiphe gorlenkoi (F.T. Chien) Giril. & Gulis (2005)
- Erysiphe gracilis R.Y. Zheng & G.Q. Chen (1981)
- Erysiphe guarinonii (Briosi & Cavara) U. Braun & S. Takam. (2000)

== H ==
- Erysiphe havrylenkoana Meeboon & S. Takam. (2012)
- Erysiphe hedwigii (Lév.) U. Braun & S. Takam. (2000)
- Erysiphe hedysari (U. Braun) U. Braun & S. Takam. (2000)
- Erysiphe hellebori Ranković (2002)
- Erysiphe helwingiae (Sawada) U. Braun & S. Takam. (2000)
- Erysiphe heraclei DC. (1815)
- Erysiphe heringeriana (U. Braun ex Dianese & A.C. Dianese) U. Braun & S. Takam. (2000)
- Erysiphe himalayensis (A.K. Sharma) U. Braun & S. Takam. (2000)
- Erysiphe hiratae U. Braun (1981)
- Erysiphe hommae U. Braun (1981)
- Erysiphe howeana U. Braun (1982)
- Erysiphe huayinensis R.Y. Zheng & G.Q. Chen (1981)
- Erysiphe hydrangeae (Z.X. Chen & R.X. Gao) U. Braun & S. Takam. (2000)
- Erysiphe hylomeci H.D. Shin & Y.J. La (1989)
- Erysiphe hyperici (Wallr.) S. Blumer (1933)
- Erysiphe hypericicola U. Braun & S. Takam. (2000)
- Erysiphe hypogena S. Takam. & U. Braun (2007)
- Erysiphe hypophylla (Nevod.) U. Braun & Cunningt. (2003)

== I ==
- Erysiphe idesiae (D.Z. Xie) U. Braun & S. Takam. (2000)
- Erysiphe incrassata (E.S. Salmon) U. Braun & S. Takam. (2000)
- Erysiphe indigoferae (H.D. Shin & Y.J. La) U. Braun & S. Takam. (2000)
- Erysiphe intermedia (U. Braun) U. Braun (2010)
- Erysiphe irregularis (R.Y. Zheng & G.Q. Chen) U. Braun & S. Takam. (2000)
- Erysiphe itoana (Y. Nomura, Tanada & U. Braun) U. Braun & S. Takam. (2000)
- Erysiphe izuensis (Y. Nomura) U. Braun & S. Takam. (2000)

== J ==
- Erysiphe jaborosae (Seaver) U. Braun & S. Takam. (2000)
- Erysiphe japonica (S. Ito & Hara) C.T. Wei (1942)
- Erysiphe jatrophae Doidge (1948)
- Erysiphe javanica Meeboon & S. Takam. (2012)
- Erysiphe juglandis (Golovin) U. Braun & S. Takam. (2000)
- Erysiphe juglandis-nigrae (U. Braun) U. Braun & S. Takam. (2000)

== K ==
- Erysiphe kapoorii Y.S. Paul & V.K. Thakur (2004)
- Erysiphe karisiana U. Braun & S. Takam. (2000)
- Erysiphe kashmirensis (N. Ahmad, A.K. Sarbhoy & Kamal) U. Braun (2012)
- Erysiphe katumotoi (U. Braun) U. Braun & S. Takam. (2000)
- Erysiphe kenjiana (Homma) U. Braun & S. Takam. (2000)
- Erysiphe kissiana S. Takam. (2015)
- Erysiphe knautiae Duby (1830)
- Erysiphe krumbholzii U. Braun (1980)
- Erysiphe kumaonensis (N. Ahmad, A.K. Sarbhoy & Kamal) U. Braun (2009)
- Erysiphe kusanoi (Syd. & P. Syd.) U. Braun & S. Takam. (2000)
- Erysiphe kydiae-calycinae (R.K. Verma, Chand & Kamal) U. Braun & S. Takam. (2000)

== L ==
- Erysiphe lata (Y. Nomura & Tanda) U. Braun & S. Takam. (2000)
- Erysiphe lathyricola U. Braun (2012)
- Erysiphe leucheriae Havryl. (1996)
- Erysiphe lianyungangensis (S.R. Yu) U. Braun & S. Takam. (2000)
- Erysiphe ligustri (Homma) U. Braun & S. Takam. (2000)
- Erysiphe limonii L. Junell (1967)
- Erysiphe linderae Abasova & S. Takam. (2018)
- Erysiphe lini Tanda (2003)
- Erysiphe liquidambaris (R.Y. Zheng & G.Q. Chen) U. Braun (2000)
- Erysiphe liriodendri Schwein. (1832)
- Erysiphe ljubarskii (Golovin) U. Braun & S. Takam. (2000)
- Erysiphe longiappendiculata Siahaan & S. Takam. (2017)
- Erysiphe longifilamentosa Siahaan & S. Takam. (2017)
- Erysiphe longissima (M.Y. Li) U. Braun & S. Takam. (2000)
- Erysiphe lonicerae DC. (1815)
- Erysiphe lonicerae-ramosissimae (Tanda) U. Braun & S. Takam. (2002)
- Erysiphe lonicerina S. Takam. (2020)
- Erysiphe ludens (E.S. Salmon) U. Braun & S. Takam. (2000)
- Erysiphe lupini M. Bradshaw (2021)
- Erysiphe lycopsidis R.Y. Zheng & G.Q. Chen (1981)
- Erysiphe lythri L. Junell (1967)

== M ==
- Erysiphe maackiae (R.Y. Zheng & G.Q. Chen) U. Braun & S. Takam. (2000)
- Erysiphe machiliana U. Braun & Y.S. Paul (2009)
- Erysiphe macleayae R.Y. Zheng & G.Q. Chen (1981)
- Erysiphe macrospora (Peck) U. Braun & S. Takam. (2000)
- Erysiphe magellanica (Thaxt.) U. Braun & S. Takam. (2000)
- Erysiphe magnifica (U. Braun) U. Braun & S. Takam. (2000)
- Erysiphe magnoliae (Sawada) U. Braun & S. Takam. (2000)
- Erysiphe magnoliicola S.E. Cho, S. Takam. & H.D. Shin (2015)
- Erysiphe magnusii (S. Blumer) U. Braun & S. Takam. (2000)
- Erysiphe malloti Zhi X. Chen & R.X. Gao (1984)
- Erysiphe malloticola U. Braun & Y.S. Paul (2009)
- Erysiphe malvae V.P. Heluta (1990)
- Erysiphe mandshurica (Miura) U. Braun (2012)
- Erysiphe manihoticola (Hosag., Siddappa, Vijay. & Udaiyan) M. Bradshaw, M.G. Cabrera & Salcedo-Sarmiento (2020)
- Erysiphe matsunamiana (Y. Nomura, Tanda & U. Braun) U. Braun & S. Takam. (2000)
- Erysiphe mayorii S. Blumer (1933)
- Erysiphe mayumi (Y. Nomura) U. Braun & S. Takam. (2000)
- Erysiphe medicaginis L. Kiss, L. Kelly & Vaghefi (2020)
- Erysiphe meliosmae (Tanda & Y. Nomura) U. Braun & S. Takam. (2000)
- Erysiphe menispermi (Howe) U. Braun & S. Takam. (2000)
- Erysiphe michikoae S. Takam. & Meeboon (2013)
- Erysiphe miranda (V.P. Heluta) U. Braun & S. Takam. (2000)
- Erysiphe misodendri (Speer & Oehrens) U. Braun & S. Takam. (2000)
- Erysiphe miurae (U. Braun) U. Braun & S. Takam. (2000)
- Erysiphe miyabeana (U. Braun) U. Braun & S. Takam. (2000)
- Erysiphe miyabei (E.S. Salmon) U. Braun & S. Takam. (2000)
- Erysiphe monascogera Shiroya, C. Nakash. & S. Takam. (2008)
- Erysiphe monoperidiata Meeboon, Divarangk. & S. Takam. (2011)
- Erysiphe montagnei Lév. (1851)
- Erysiphe mori (I. Miyake) U. Braun & S. Takam. (2000)
- Erysiphe multappendicis (Z.Y. Zhao & Y.N. Yu) U. Braun & S. Takam. (2000)
- Erysiphe munjalii Y.S. Paul & L.N. Bhardwaj (2001)
- Erysiphe myoschili (Neger) U. Braun & S. Takam. (2000)

== N ==
- Erysiphe necator Schwein. (1832)
- Erysiphe neglecta (U. Braun) U. Braun & S. Takam. (2000)
- Erysiphe nemopanthi (Peck) U. Braun & S. Takam. (2000)
- Erysiphe neomexicana (U. Braun) U. Braun & S. Takam. (2000)
- Erysiphe nepetae Sawada (1951)
- Erysiphe nishidana (Homma) U. Braun & S. Takam. (2000)
- Erysiphe nomurae (U. Braun) U. Braun (2001)
- Erysiphe nothofagi (Thaxt.) U. Braun & S. Takam. (2000)
- Erysiphe nyctaginacearum (Hosag.) Meeboon & S. Takam. (2017)

== O ==
- Erysiphe oehrensii (Havryl.) U. Braun & S. Takam. (2000)
- Erysiphe oleosa (R.Y. Zheng & G.Q. Chen) U. Braun & S. Takam. (2000)
- Erysiphe orixae (U. Braun & Tanada) U. Braun & S. Takam. (2000)
- Erysiphe ornata (U. Braun) U. Braun & S. Takam. (2000)
- Erysiphe ostryae M. Bradshaw (2021)
- Erysiphe otanii Y. Nomura (1997)
- Erysiphe ovidiae (Havryl.) U. Braun & S. Takam. (2000)

== P ==
- Erysiphe paeoniae R.Y. Zheng & G.Q. Chen (1981)
- Erysiphe palczewskii (Jacz.) U. Braun & S. Takam. (2000)
- Erysiphe panacis R.L. Bai & W.C. Liu (1998)
- Erysiphe paracarpinicola Meeboon & S. Takam. (2013)
- Erysiphe paradoxa (Simonyan) U. Braun & S. Takam. (2000)
- Erysiphe parnassiae (Halst.) Jacz. (1927)
- Erysiphe parvifoliae R. Kirschner (2020)
- Erysiphe parvula (Cooke & Peck) U. Braun & S. Takam. (2000)
- Erysiphe patagoniaca Havryl. & S. Takam. (2003)
- Erysiphe paulii U. Braun & S. Takam. (2000)
- Erysiphe peckii (U. Braun) U. Braun & S. Takam. (2000)
- Erysiphe pedaliacearum (H.D. Shin) H.D. Shin (2019)
- Erysiphe penicillata (Wallr.) Link (1824)
- Erysiphe peristrophes (N. Ahmad, A.K. Sarbhoy & Kamal) U. Braun & S. Takam. (2000)
- Erysiphe periyarensis T.S. Ramakr. (1965)
- Erysiphe peruviana (Syd.) U. Braun & S. Takam. (2000)
- Erysiphe phygelii Xue Y. Wang & L.X. Zhang (1997)
- Erysiphe phyllanthi (Tanada & U. Braun) U. Braun & S. Takam. (2000)
- Erysiphe picrasmae (Sawada) U. Braun & S. Takam. (2000)
- Erysiphe picrasmicola U. Braun & S. Takam. (2002)
- Erysiphe pileae U. Braun (1981)
- Erysiphe pirottiana (Bacc.) U. Braun & S. Takam. (2000)
- Erysiphe pisi DC. (1805)
- Erysiphe pistaciae (J.Y. Lu & K.R. Wang) U. Braun & S. Takam. (2000)
- Erysiphe platani (Howe) U. Braun & S. Takam. (2000)
- Erysiphe plectranthi H.D. Shin & Y.J. La (1988)
- Erysiphe poeltii U. Braun (1984)
- Erysiphe polygoni DC. (1805)
- Erysiphe populicola U. Braun (2012)
- Erysiphe praelonga (S.R. Yu) U. Braun & S. Takam. (2000)
- Erysiphe praeterita (Marasas & I.H. Schum.) U. Braun (2012)
- Erysiphe prasadii (M.K. Bhatn. & K.L. Kothari) U. Braun & S. Takam. (2000)
- Erysiphe prunastri DC. (1815)
- Erysiphe pseudacaciae (P.D. Marchenko) U. Braun & S. Takam. (2000)
- Erysiphe pseudocarpinicola (Y. Nomura & Tanda) U. Braun & S. Takam. (2000)
- Erysiphe pseudocedrelae (R.Y. Zheng & G.Q. Chen) U. Braun & S. Takam. (2000)
- Erysiphe pseudocorylacearum Meeboon & M. Bradshaw (2021)
- Erysiphe pseudoehretiae (R.Y. Zheng & G.Q. Chen) U. Braun & S. Takam. (2000)
- Erysiphe pseudogracilis Siahaan & S. Takam. (2017)
- Erysiphe pseudolonicerae (E.S. Salmon) U. Braun & S. Takam. (2000)
- Erysiphe pseudopusilla U. Braun & S. Takam. (2000)
- Erysiphe pseudoregularis U. Braun (2012)
- Erysiphe pseudoviburni Y.J. Choi, H.D. Shin & S. Takam. (2020)
- Erysiphe puerariae R.Y. Zheng & G.Q. Chen (1981)
- Erysiphe pulchra (Cooke & Peck) U. Braun & S. Takam. (2000)
- Erysiphe punicae T.M. Achundov (1987)
- Erysiphe pusilla Tanda & Y. Nomura (1992)
- Erysiphe pyrenaica (Vienn.-Bourg.) U. Braun & S. Takam. (2000)

== Q ==
- Erysiphe quercicola S. Takam. & U. Braun (2007)
- Erysiphe quercifolia U. Braun & Y.S. Paul (2009)

== R ==
- Erysiphe rabdosiae R.Y. Zheng & G.Q. Chen (1981)
- Erysiphe radulescui Docea, (1968)
- Erysiphe ravenelii (Berk.) U. Braun & S. Takam. (2000)
- Erysiphe rayssiae (Mayor) U. Braun & S. Takam. (2000)
- Erysiphe reddyana U. Braun (1982)
- Erysiphe religiosa (T.S. Ramakr.) U. Braun & Y.S. Paul (2009)
- Erysiphe rhamnicola (Y.N. Yu) U. Braun & S. Takam. (2000)
- Erysiphe ribicola (Havryl.) U. Braun & S. Takam. (2000)
- Erysiphe robiniae Grev. (1824)
- Erysiphe rodgersiae (Y. Nomura) U. Braun (1995)
- Erysiphe rorippae G.Q. Chen & R.Y. Zheng (1984)
- Erysiphe rosae (Golovin & Gamalizk.) U. Braun & S. Takam. (2000)
- Erysiphe rubicola (B.J. Murray) Boesew. (1976)
- Erysiphe russellii (Clinton) U. Braun & S. Takam. (2000)

== S ==
- Erysiphe salicicola Hyang B. Lee, P.M. Kirk & T.T.T. Nguyen (2021)
- Erysiphe salicis DC. (1805)
- Erysiphe salmonii (Syd. & P. Syd.) U. Braun & S. Takam. (2000)
- Erysiphe sambuci S. Ahmad (1961)
- Erysiphe santalacearum V.P. Heluta, Tikhon., Burgyuk. & Dudka (1987)
- Erysiphe sapindi (S.R. Yu) U. Braun & S. Takam. (2000)
- Erysiphe schisandrae (Sawada) U. Braun & S. Takam. (2000)
- Erysiphe schizophragmatis (Tanda & Y. Nomura) U. Braun & S. Takam. (2000)
- Erysiphe scholzii U. Braun & Bolay (2005)
- Erysiphe securinegae (F.L. Tai & C.T. Wei) U. Braun & S. Takam. (2000)
- Erysiphe sedi U. Braun (1981)
- Erysiphe semitosta (Berk. & M.A. Curtis ex Cooke & Peck) U. Braun & S. Takam. (2000)
- Erysiphe sengokui (E.S. Salmon) U. Braun & S. Takam. (2000)
- Erysiphe sepulta Ellis & Everh. ex Sacc. (1891)
- Erysiphe sequinii (Y.N. Yu & Y.Q. Lai) U. Braun & S. Takam. (2000)
- Erysiphe seravschanica (Korbonsk.) U. Braun & S. Takam. (2000)
- Erysiphe sesbaniae Wolcan & U. Braun (2010)
- Erysiphe shinanoensis (Tanada) U. Braun & S. Takam. (2000)
- Erysiphe shinii U. Braun & S. Takam. (2002)
- Erysiphe sibiliae (Ciccar.) U. Braun & S. Takam. (2000)
- Erysiphe sichuanica (Y.N. Yu) U. Braun & Tanda (2000)
- Erysiphe sidae Siahaan & S. Takam. (2015)
- Erysiphe sikkimensis Chona, J.N. Kapoor & H.S. Gill (1960)
- Erysiphe simulans (E.S. Salmon) U. Braun & S. Takam. (2000)
- Erysiphe sinensis (F.L. Tai & C.T. Wei) U. Braun & S. Takam. (2000)
- Erysiphe sinomenii (Y.N. Yu) U. Braun (2012)
- Erysiphe sophorae (Gándara) U. Braun (2012)
- Erysiphe staphyleae (Sawada) U. Braun & S. Takam. (2000)
- Erysiphe statices (Potebnia) V.P. Heluta, Tikhon., Burgyuk. & Dudka (1987)
- Erysiphe stephaniae Tanda & Tas. Fukuda (1994)
- Erysiphe subtrichotoma (U. Braun) U. Braun & S. Takam. (2000)
- Erysiphe swainsonae (Y.N. Yu & Y.Q. Lai) U. Braun & S. Takam. (2000)
- Erysiphe sydowiana (U. Braun) U. Braun & S. Takam. (2000)
- Erysiphe symphoricarpi (Howe) U. Braun & S. Takam. (2000)
- Erysiphe symploci J.N. Kapoor (1965)
- Erysiphe symplocicola R.Y. Zheng & G.Q. Chen (1981)
- Erysiphe symplocigena U. Braun & S. Takam. (2002)
- Erysiphe syringae Schwein. (1832)
- Erysiphe syringae-japonicae (U. Braun) U. Braun & S. Takam. (2000)

== T ==
- Erysiphe takamatsui Y. Nomura (1997)
- Erysiphe tectonae (E.S. Salmon) U. Braun & S. Takam. (2000)
- Erysiphe thaxteri (Havryl. & U. Braun) U. Braun & S. Takam. (2000)
- Erysiphe thermopsidis R.Y. Zheng & G.Q. Chen (1981)
- Erysiphe thesii L. Junell (1967)
- Erysiphe thuemenii U. Braun (1983)
- Erysiphe tiliae (Eliade) U. Braun & S. Takam. (2000)
- Erysiphe togashiana (U. Braun) U. Braun & S. Takam. (2000)
- Erysiphe tortilis (Wallr.) Link (1824)
- Erysiphe toxicodendricola (Z.X. Chen & Y.J. Yao) U. Braun & S. Takam. (2000)
- Erysiphe trifolii Grev. (1824)
- Erysiphe trifoliorum (Wallr.) U. Braun (2010)
- Erysiphe typhulochaetoides U. Braun (2012)

== U ==
- Erysiphe udaipurensis (M.K. Bhatn. & K.L. Kothari) U. Braun & S. Takam. (2000)
- Erysiphe ulmariae Pers. ex Desm. (1846)
- Erysiphe ulmi Castagne (1845)
- Erysiphe umbilici (Kom.) U. Braun & S. Takam. (2000)
- Erysiphe uncinuloides Siahaan & S. Takam. (2017)
- Erysiphe urticae (Wallr.) S. Blumer (1933)

== V ==
- Erysiphe vanbruntiana (W.R. Gerard) U. Braun & S. Takam. (2000)
- Erysiphe variabilis (R.Y. Zheng & G.Q. Chen) U. Braun & S. Takam. (2000)
- Erysiphe verbenicola U. Braun & S. Takam. (2000)
- Erysiphe verniciferae (Henn.) U. Braun & S. Takam. (2000)
- Erysiphe vernoniae (Viégas) U. Braun & S. Takam. (2000)
- Erysiphe verruculosa (Y.N. Yu & Y.Q. Lai) U. Braun & S. Takam. (2000)
- Erysiphe viburni Duby (1830)
- Erysiphe viburnicola U. Braun & S. Takam. (2000)
- Erysiphe viburniphila M. Bradshaw (2020)
- Erysiphe viburni-plicati Meeboon & S. Takam. (2015)
- Erysiphe viciae-unijugae (Homma) U. Braun (1981)
- Erysiphe viegasii (Dianese & A.C. Dianese) U. Braun & S. Takam. (2000)
- Erysiphe vignae L. Kelly, L. Kiss & Vaghefi (2021)

== W ==
- Erysiphe wadae S. Takam. & Y. Sato (2003)
- Erysiphe wallrothii (U. Braun & Tanda) U. Braun & S. Takam. (2000)
- Erysiphe weigelae-decorae U. Braun & S. Takam. (2000)
- Erysiphe werneri U. Braun (1983)
- Erysiphe wuyiensis (Zhi X. Chen & R.X. Gao) U. Braun & S. Takam. (2000)

== Y ==
- Erysiphe yaanensis (J.F. Tao & T.J. Li) U. Braun & S. Takam. (2000)
- Erysiphe yamadae (E.S. Salmon) U. Braun & S. Takam. (2000)
- Erysiphe yanshanensis T.Z. Liu & U. Braun (2007)

== Z ==
- Erysiphe zelkovae (Henn.) U. Braun (2012)
