= Erysiphe frickii =

Scientific classification
- Kingdom: Fungi
- Division: Ascomycota
- Class: Leotiomycetes
- Order: Erysiphales
- Family: Erysiphaceae
- Genus: Erysiphe
- Species: E. frickii

Binomial name
- Erysiphe frickii Neger, 1899

Species of fungus

Erysiphe frickii is a species of powdery mildew in the family Erysiphaceae. It is found in South America, on Geum species native to the region.

== Description ==
The fungus forms thin, white irregular patches on the leaves of its host. Erysiphe frickii, like most Erysiphaceae, is highly host-specific and infects only one genus. The species on Eurasian species of Geum is an undescribed member of the Podosphaera aphanis complex. The species on North American Geum is Podosphaera septentrionalis, which has much smaller chasmothecia than E. frickii.

== Taxonomy ==
The fungus was formally described in 1899 by Neger.
