= Microsphaera euphorbiae =

Scientific classification
- Domain: Eukaryota
- Kingdom: Fungi
- Division: Ascomycota
- Class: Leotiomycetes
- Order: Erysiphales
- Family: Erysiphaceae
- Genus: Microsphaera
- Species: M. euphorbiae

Binomial name
- Microsphaera euphorbiae Berk. & M.A. Curtis, (1876)

Species of fungus

Microsphaera euphorbiae is a plant pathogen.
