= E. communis =

E. communis may refer to:

- Erysiphe communis, a synonym of many powdery mildew species under a 20th-century species concept
- Erysiphe communis f. betae, a synonym for Erysiphe betae, a form of powdery mildew that affects the sugar beet

== See also ==
- Communis (disambiguation)
