= Erysiphe euphorbiae-cotinifoliae =

Scientific classification
- Kingdom: Fungi
- Division: Ascomycota
- Class: Leotiomycetes
- Order: Helotiales
- Family: Erysiphaceae
- Genus: Erysiphe
- Species: E. euphorbiae-cotinifoliae

Binomial name
- Erysiphe euphorbiae-cotinifoliae Fern.-Pav. & S. Takam., 2024

Species of fungus

Erysiphe euphorbiae-cotinifoliae is a species of powdery mildew in the family Erysiphaceae. It is found in North America, where it affects Euphorbia cotinifolia.

== Description ==
The fungus forms diffuse white patches on the leaves of its host. Erysiphe euphorbiae-cotinifoliae, like most Erysiphaceae, is highly host-specific and infects only the one species. A variety of other species of Erysiphaceae are found on other species of Euphorbia.

== Taxonomy ==
The fungus was formally described in 2024 by S. Fernández-Pavía & S. Takamatsu. The type specimen was collected in Mexico, on Euphorbia cotinifolia. The specific epithet derives from the type host.
