= Microsphaera coryli =

Scientific classification
- Domain: Eukaryota
- Kingdom: Fungi
- Division: Ascomycota
- Class: Leotiomycetes
- Order: Erysiphales
- Family: Erysiphaceae
- Genus: Microsphaera
- Species: M. coryli

Binomial name
- Microsphaera coryli Homma, (1937)

Species of fungus

Microsphaera coryli is a fungal plant pathogen.
