= Erysiphe abeliana =

Scientific classification
- Kingdom: Fungi
- Division: Ascomycota
- Class: Leotiomycetes
- Order: Helotiales
- Family: Erysiphaceae
- Genus: Erysiphe
- Species: E. abeliana

Binomial name
- Erysiphe abeliana Bolay & U. Braun, 2021

Species of fungus

Erysiphe abeliana is a species of powdery mildew in the family Erysiphaceae. It is found in North America and Europe, where it affects Abelia x grandiflora.

== Description ==
The fungus forms patches of mycelium on the leaves of its host. The mycelium and chasmothecia can be found on either the upperside (most commonly) or occasionally on both sides of the leaf. Erysiphe abeliana, like most Erysiphaceae, is highly host-specific and is currently known only to infect cultivated Abelia x grandiflora, a hybrid between Abelia chinensis and Abelia uniflora. While the powdery mildew has not been recorded on these hosts, it seems likely that it may infect at least one of them, and the species may even originate from their native ranges in East Asia. Only one other species is currently known from the genus Abelia: Erysiphe abeliae, which is known only from the type collection in China.

== Taxonomy ==
The fungus was formally described in 2021 by Adrien Bolay and Uwe Braun based on collections from France and Switzerland. The type specimen was collected in Switzerland. The specific epithet derives from the name of the host genus. It is most closely related to Erysiphe abeliicola, a pathogen of Diabelia, despite its apparent morphological similarities with Erysiphe chifengensis, a pathogen of Zabelia.
