= Microsphaera hommae =

Scientific classification
- Domain: Eukaryota
- Kingdom: Fungi
- Division: Ascomycota
- Class: Leotiomycetes
- Order: Erysiphales
- Family: Erysiphaceae
- Genus: Microsphaera
- Species: M. hommae

Binomial name
- Microsphaera hommae U. Braun, (1982)

Species of fungus

Microsphaera hommae is a plant pathogen.
