= Microsphaera ellisii =

Scientific classification
- Kingdom: Fungi
- Division: Ascomycota
- Class: Leotiomycetes
- Order: Helotiales
- Family: Erysiphaceae
- Genus: Microsphaera
- Species: M. ellisii

Binomial name
- Microsphaera ellisii U. Braun, (1982)

Species of fungus

Microsphaera ellisii is a plant pathogen.
