= Microsphaera verruculosa =

Scientific classification
- Domain: Eukaryota
- Kingdom: Fungi
- Division: Ascomycota
- Class: Leotiomycetes
- Order: Erysiphales
- Family: Erysiphaceae
- Genus: Microsphaera
- Species: M. verruculosa

Binomial name
- Microsphaera verruculosa Y.N. Yu & Y.Q. Lai, (1981)

Species of fungus

Microsphaera verruculosa is a plant pathogen.
