= Franz Wilhelm Neger =

German botanist (1868–1923)

- Born: 2 June 1868; Nuremberg, Germany
- Died: 6 May 1923 (aged 54); Dresden, Germany
- Education: Ludwig-Maximilians-Universität München
- Occupations: botanist, mycologist, dendrologist
- Known for: natural sciences
- Notable work: see Selected works

Franz Wilhelm Neger (2 June 1868, Nuremberg – 6 May 1923, Dresden) was a German botanist, mycologist and dendrologist.

He studied chemistry and natural sciences at the Ludwig-Maximilians-Universität München, where his influences included Adolf von Baeyer and Paul Groth. From 1893, he taught classes in natural sciences at the "German college" in Concepción, Chile, during which time, he conducted botanical and mycological research in the Andes and Patagonia as well as in areas in the vicinity of Concepción.

In 1897, he returned to Europe as a chemistry assistant at the industrial school in Munich. During the following year he taught classes in chemistry and sciences at a secondary school in Wunsiedel and edited his South American collections as the exsiccata series Uredineae Austro-americanae. In 1899, Neger became a custodian at the botanical museum in Munich. In 1902, he received his habilitation under the sponsorship of Karl Ritter von Goebel and Ludwig Radlkofer. Afterwards, he worked as a professor at the forest academies in Eisenach from 1902 and Tharandt from 1905 until 1920, and in the meantime, took research trips to southern Spain in 1907, Dalmatia in 1909, Corsica in 1911 and Sweden several times. Between 1916 and 1921, Neger edited the exsiccata Forstschädliche Pilze herausgegeben von F.W. Neger, Tharandt. In 1920, he was named director of the botanical institute and gardens at the Royal Saxon Polytechnic in Dresden.

The mycological genera Negeriella (Henn., 1897) and Mikronegeria (Dietel, 1899) are named after him, as is the ambrosia fungus Wolfgangiella franznegeri (C. Mayers, T.C. Harr. & Roets, 2019).

== Selected works ==
- Beiträge zur Biologie der Erysipheen, 1901 – Contribution to the biology of Erysiphe.
- Die Handelspflanzen Deutschlands : ihre Verbreitung, wirtschaftliche Bedeutung und technische Verwendung, 1904 – Commercial plants of Germany; distribution, economic importance and technical use.
- Die Nadelhölzer (Koniferen) und übrigen Gymnospermen, 1907 – Softwoods (conifers) and other gymnosperms.
- Chilenisch-patagonische Charakterpflanzen, 1908 – Chilean-Patagonian plant characteristics.
- Biologie der pflanzen auf experimenteller grundlage (bionomie), 1913 – Biology of plants on an experimental basis (bionomics).
- Die Laubhölzer kurzgefaßte Beschreibung der in Mitteleuropa gedeihenden Laubbäume und Sträucher, 1914 – Hardwoods summary and description of central European deciduous trees and shrubs.
- Die Krankheiten unserer Waldbäume und wichtigsten Gartengehölze, 1919 – Diseases of forest trees and primary garden trees.
