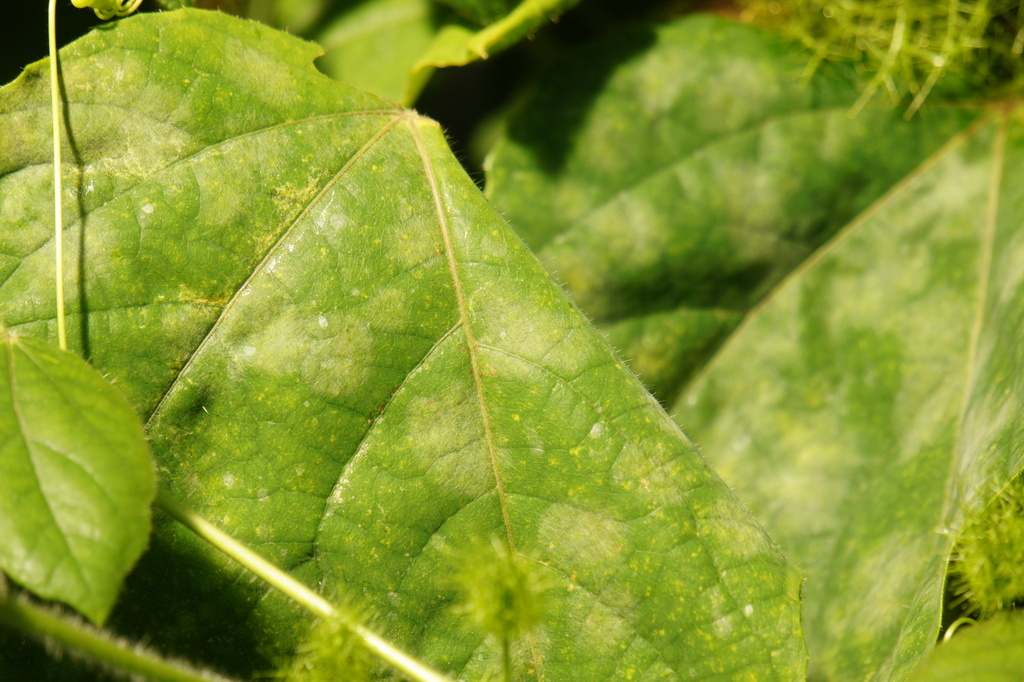

Scientific classification
- Kingdom: Fungi
- Division: Ascomycota
- Class: Leotiomycetes
- Order: Helotiales
- Family: Erysiphaceae
- Genus: Erysiphe
- Species: E. passiflorae

Binomial name
- Erysiphe passiflorae (Politis) M. Bradshaw, U. Braun & Pfister, 2023

Synonyms
- Oidium passiflorae Politis, 1938; Pseudoidium passiflorae (Politis) U. Braun & R.T.A. Cook, 2012; Oidium goosii Bappamm., 1995

= Erysiphe passiflorae =

Species of fungus

Erysiphe passiflorae is a species of powdery mildew in the family Erysiphaceae. It is found across the globe, where it affects passion flowers (genus Passiflora).

== Description ==
The fungus forms soft, white patches on the upperside of the leaves of its host. Erysiphe passiflorae, like most Erysiphaceae, is highly host-specific and infects only plants in the genus Passiflora. The foot cells of the conidiophores are long, up to 80 μm, and frequently flexuous-sinuous in the lower half, and the conidia are characteristically long and slender, 25–63 × 7–19 μm, with a length/width ratio from 1.5 to 3.5.

== Taxonomy ==
The fungus was formally described in 1938 by Politis with the basionym Oidium passiflorae. The type specimen was collected in Greece, on Passiflora caerulea. The specific epithet derives from the type host. The species was transferred to the genus Erysiphe by M. Bradshaw, U. Braun and D.H. Pfister in 2023. The species falls within the Erysiphe aquilegiae complex.
