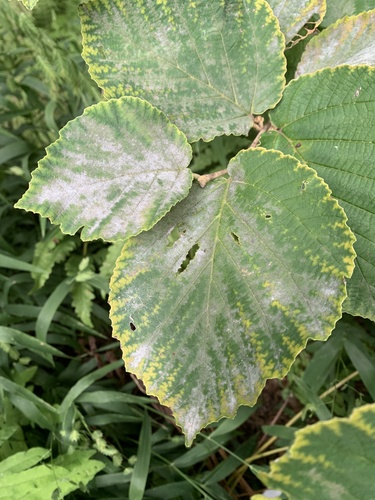

Scientific classification
- Kingdom: Fungi
- Division: Ascomycota
- Class: Leotiomycetes
- Order: Helotiales
- Family: Erysiphaceae
- Genus: Erysiphe
- Species: E. biuncinata

Binomial name
- Erysiphe biuncinata (Cooke & Peck) M. Bradshaw, U. Braun & Pfister, 2024

Synonyms
- Podosphaera biuncinata Cooke & Peck, 1872

= Erysiphe biuncinata =

Species of fungus

Erysiphe biuncinata is a species of powdery mildew in the family Erysiphaceae. It is found in North America, where it affects the genus Hamamelis.

== Description ==
The fungus forms a patchy white coating on host leaves, often around main veins. E. biuncinata, like most Erysiphaceae, is highly host-specific and infects only the genus Hamamelis. Another species of powdery mildew also infects this genus: Phyllactinia hamamelidis, which has weak, very thin, often smooth growth, on the undersides of leaves.

== Taxonomy ==
The fungus was formally described in 1872 by Cooke and Peck with the basionym Podosphaera biuncinata. The species was transferred to the genus Erysiphe by Bradshaw et al. in 2024.
