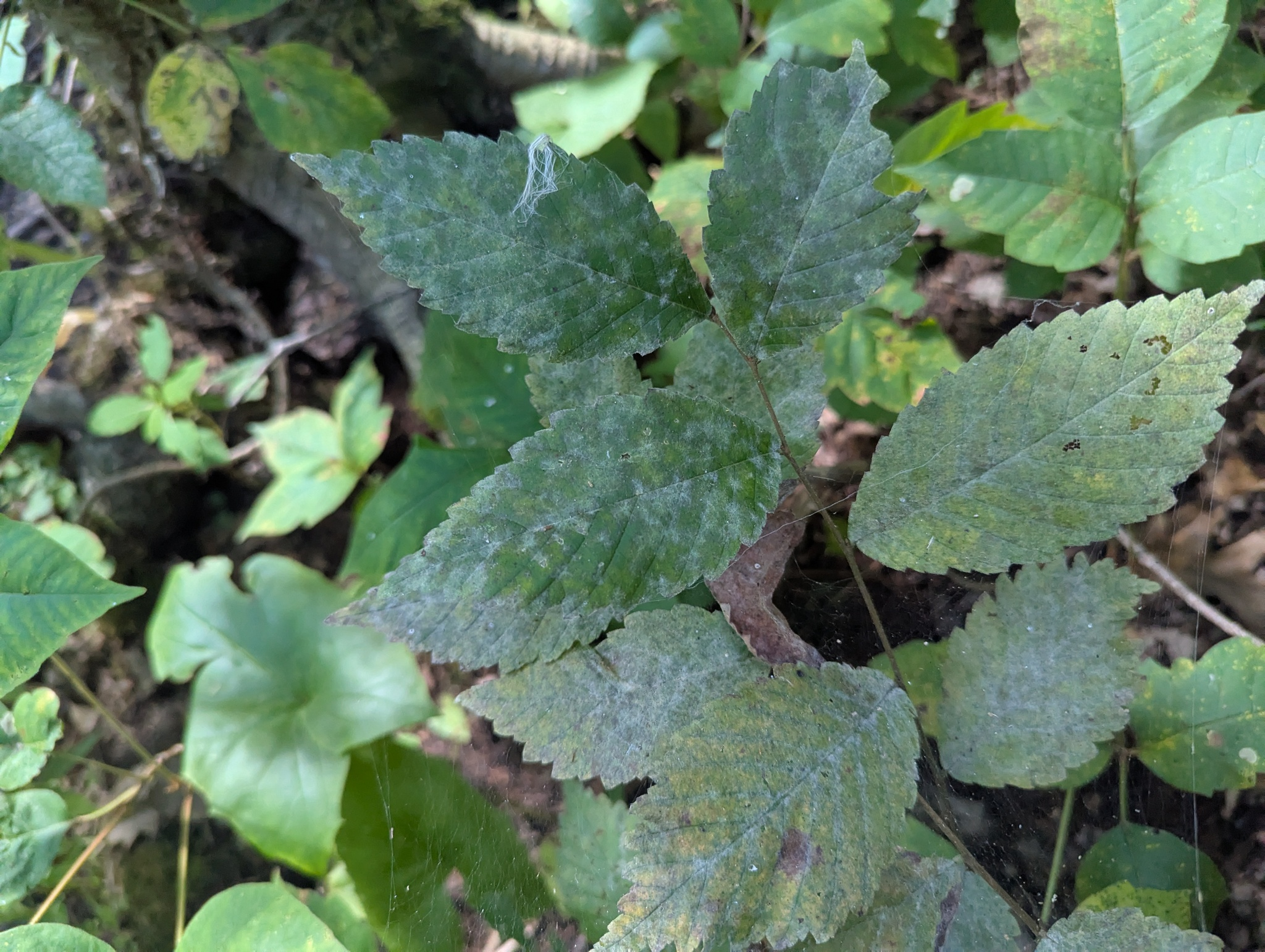
- Erysiphe macrospora on Ulmus

Scientific classification
- Kingdom: Fungi
- Division: Ascomycota
- Class: Leotiomycetes
- Order: Helotiales
- Family: Erysiphaceae
- Genus: Erysiphe
- Species: E. macrospora

Binomial name
- Erysiphe macrospora (Peck) U. Braun & S. Takam., 2000

Synonyms
- Uncinula macrospora Peck, 1872; Uncinula intermedia Berk. & M.A. Curtis, 1876

= Erysiphe macrospora =

Species of fungus

Erysiphe macrospora is a species of powdery mildew in the family Erysiphaceae. It is distributed across North America, where it infects species in the genus Ulmus (elms).
