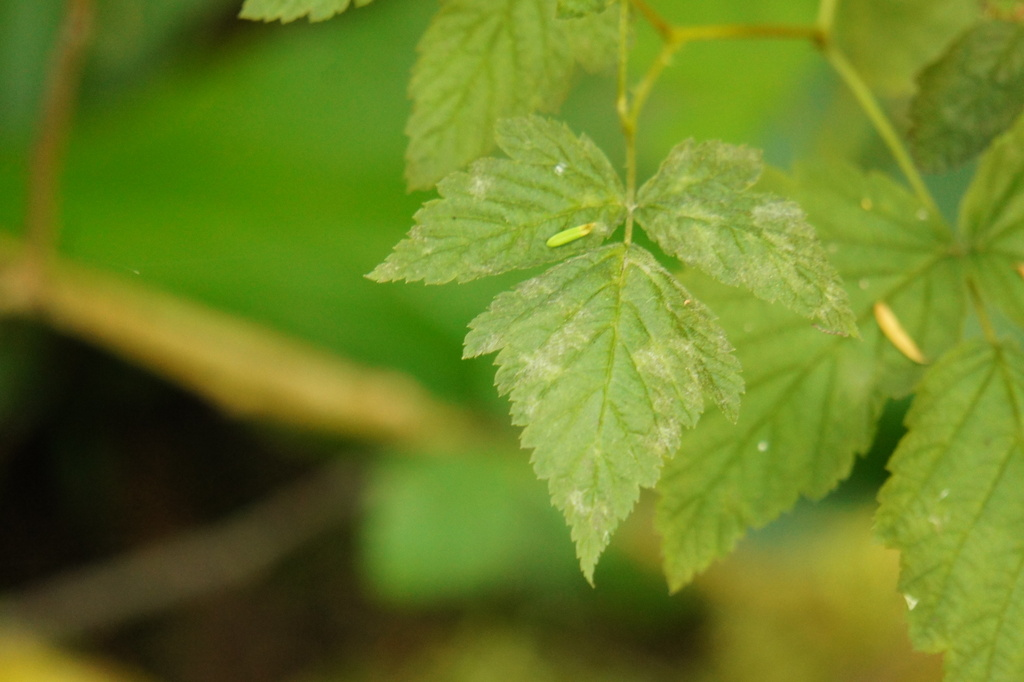

Scientific classification
- Kingdom: Fungi
- Division: Ascomycota
- Class: Leotiomycetes
- Order: Helotiales
- Family: Erysiphaceae
- Genus: Podosphaera
- Species: P. rubi-spectabilis

Binomial name
- Podosphaera rubi-spectabilis M. Bradshaw & M. Liu, 2025

= Podosphaera rubi-spectabilis =

Fungal pathogen of plants

Podosphaera rubi-spectabilis is a species of powdery mildew in the family Erysiphaceae. It is found wherever its host plant species (Rubus spectabilis and Rubus ursinus) are, mostly in the west of North America.

== Description ==
The fungus forms thin, white irregular patches on the leaves of its host. Podosphaera rubi-spectabilis, like most Erysiphaceae, is highly host-specific and infects only two species of Rubus. Other species in the genus are infected by the closely-related Podosphaera ruborum.

== Taxonomy ==
The fungus was formally described in 2025 by Bradshaw and Liu. It is a member of the Podosphaera aphanis complex of species and was formally considered conspecific with that species.
