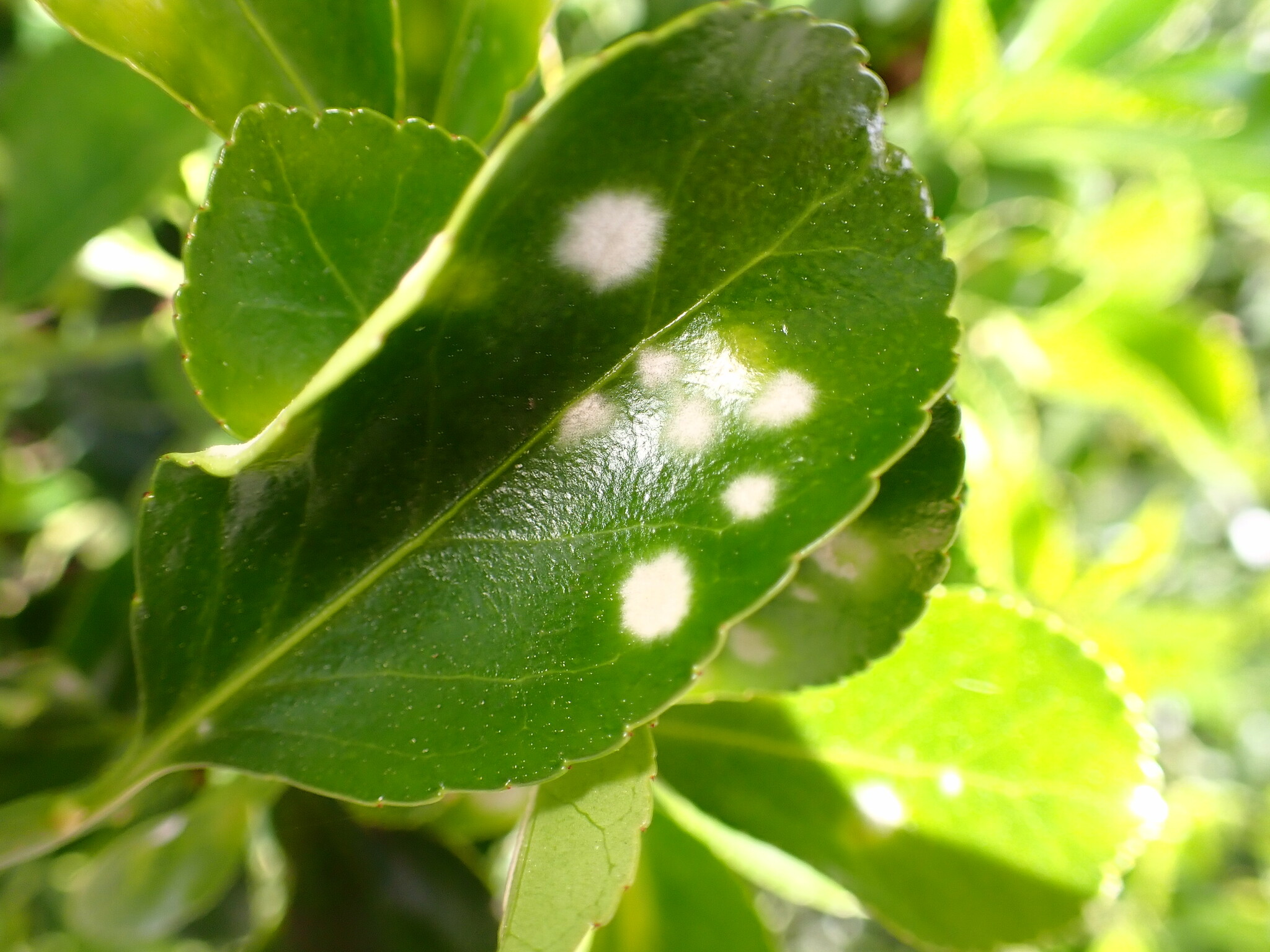
- Erysiphe euonymicola on a leaf of Euonymus japonicus.

Scientific classification
- Kingdom: Fungi
- Division: Ascomycota
- Class: Leotiomycetes
- Order: Helotiales
- Family: Erysiphaceae
- Genus: Erysiphe
- Species: E. euonymicola

Binomial name
- Erysiphe euonymicola Braun, 2012

Synonyms
- Erysiphe euonymi-japonici (Arcangeli) Braun & Takamatsu, 2000; Microsphaera euonymi-japonici (Arcangeli) Hara, 1921

= Erysiphe euonymicola =

Powdery mildew

Erysiphe euonymicola is a powdery mildew which infects Euonymus fortunei and Euonymus japonicus.
