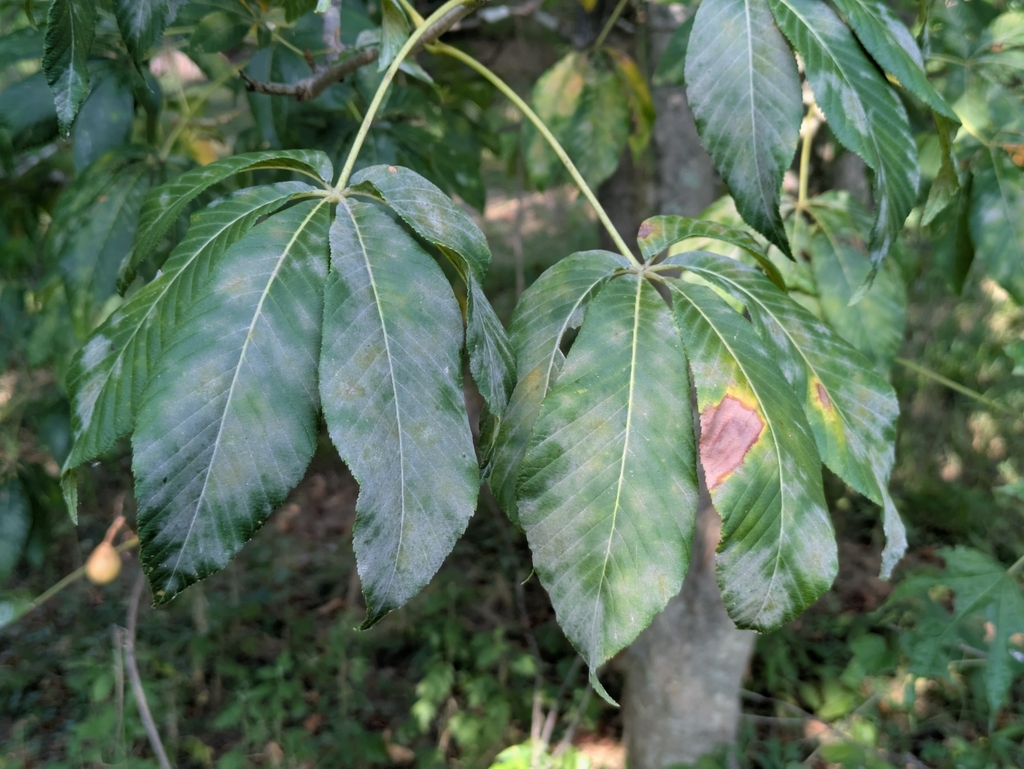
- Erysiphe aesculi-sylvaticae on Aesculus pavia

Scientific classification
- Kingdom: Fungi
- Division: Ascomycota
- Class: Leotiomycetes
- Order: Helotiales
- Family: Erysiphaceae
- Genus: Erysiphe
- Species: E. aesculi-sylvaticae

Binomial name
- Erysiphe aesculi-sylvaticae Andr. Paul & M. Bradshaw, 2025

= Erysiphe aesculi-sylvaticae =

Species of fungus

Erysiphe aesculi-sylvaticae is a species of powdery mildew in the family Erysiphaceae. It is found in North America, where it affects native hosts Aesculus sylvatica and Aesculus pavia.

== Description ==
The fungus forms thin, white irregular patches on the leaves of its host. Erysiphe aesculi-sylvaticae, like most Erysiphaceae, is highly host-specific and infects only two species of Aesculus. The species on other Aesculus, which has been introduced to Europe and Asia, is Erysiphe flexuosa. The species on Aesculus flava likely represents another undescribed species.

== Taxonomy ==
The fungus was formally described in 2025 by Andrew Paul and Michael Bradshaw. The species epithet refers to the type host, Aesculus sylvatica. The type specimen was collected in North Carolina. E. aesculi-sylvaticae differs from E. flexuosa in having short uncinuloid chasmothecial appendages (shorter than the chasmothecial diameter) and in being confined to host species of Aesculus sect. Pavia.
