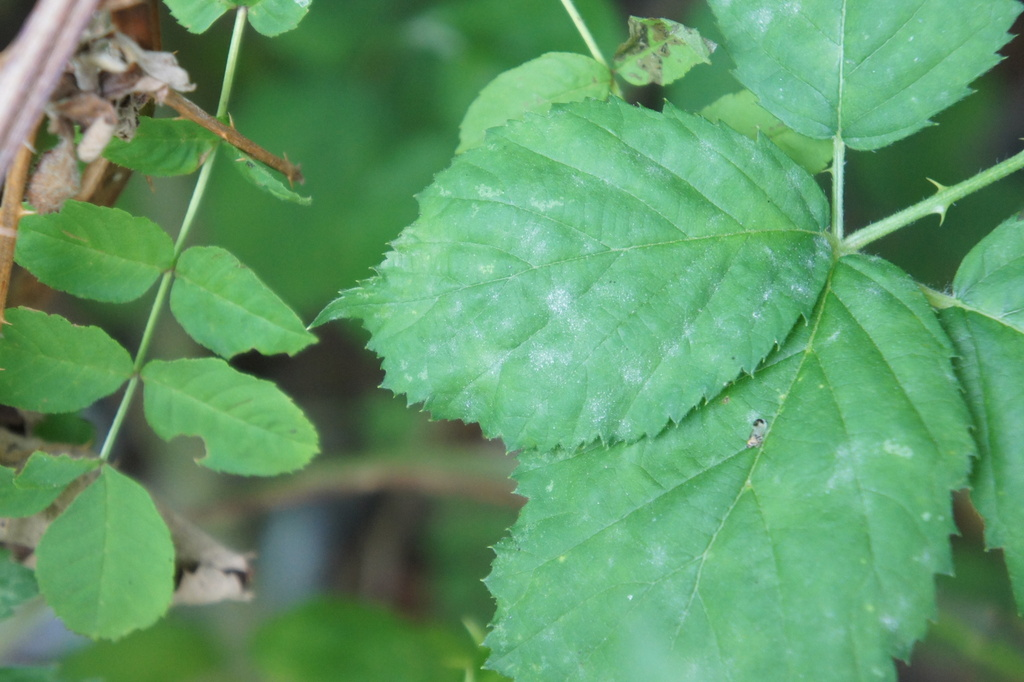

Scientific classification
- Kingdom: Fungi
- Division: Ascomycota
- Class: Leotiomycetes
- Order: Helotiales
- Family: Erysiphaceae
- Genus: Podosphaera
- Species: P. ruborum

Binomial name
- Podosphaera ruborum (Rabenh.) M. Bradshaw & M. Liu, 2025

Synonyms
- Oidium ruborum Rabenh., 1878

= Podosphaera ruborum =

Fungal pathogen of plants

Podosphaera ruborum is a species of powdery mildew in the family Erysiphaceae. It is found across Europe and North America, on plants in the genus Rubus, including multiple commercially significant crops.

== Description ==
The fungus forms thin, white irregular patches on the leaves of its host. Podosphaera ruborum, like most Erysiphaceae, is highly host-specific and infects only the genus Rubus. Two species in the genus (Rubus spectabilis and Rubus ursinus) are instead infected by the closely-related species Podosphaera rubi-spectabilis.

== Taxonomy ==
The fungus was formally described in 1878 by Rabenhorst with the basionym Oidium ruborum. The new combination Podosphaera ruborum was created by Bradshaw and Liu in 2025. It is a member of the Podosphaera aphanis complex of species and was formally considered conspecific with that species.
