= Erysiphe azerbaijanica =

Scientific classification
- Kingdom: Fungi
- Division: Ascomycota
- Class: Leotiomycetes
- Order: Helotiales
- Family: Erysiphaceae
- Genus: Erysiphe
- Species: E. azerbaijanica

Binomial name
- Erysiphe azerbaijanica Abasova, Aghayeva & S.Takam. (2018)

Species of fungus

Erysiphe azerbaijanica is a species of powdery mildew in the family Erysiphaceae. It is found in Azerbaijan, where it grows on the leaves of sweet chestnut trees.

== Taxonomy ==
The fungus was formally described as a new species in 2018 by Lamiya Abasova, Dilzara Aghayeva, and Susumu Takamatsu. The type specimen was collected near Baş Küngüt village (Shaki District), where it was found growing on sweet chestnut (Castanea sativa). Molecular phylogenetic analysis showed that the species forms its own clade in the Microsphaera lineage of genus Erysiphe. The species epithet refers to the country of the type locality.

== Description ==
On infected leaves the fungus makes thin, white, irregular patches on both surfaces. The mycelium (the surface growth) is amphigenous (present on both leaf faces) white, thin and irregular, and may fade or persist. Hyphae are straight to slightly curved, hyaline, thin-walled and smooth, about 4–6 μm wide. Small attachment structures (hyphal appressoria) are solitary, nipple-shaped to slightly lobed and can be inconspicuous. Conidiophores (spore-bearing stalks) arise from the upper part of the mother cell, are erect and straight, and reach about 125 μm in length. The basal "foot cells" are cylindrical and straight, typically (28–)31–53(–64) × (4–)5–7 μm. The asexual spores (conidia) are produced singly and are mostly cylindrical to oblong (occasionally ellipsoid), measuring 33–48(–54) × (12–)14–16(–18) μm, with a length/width ratio (L/W) of 2–3.6. The sexual morph has not been observed.

Erysiphe alphitoides, E. castaneae, and E. castaneigena are somewhat similar in morphology, but can be distinguished by the dimensions and form of their conidia and foot cells. It differs from E. alphitoides (conidia 25–40(–45) × 13–25 μm; foot cells 15–40 μm long; conidia often ellipsoid–doliiform; L/W 1.4–2.3) and E. castaneae (conidia 28–35 × 14–18 μm) in its larger, mainly cylindrical conidia and longer conidiophores/foot cells; it differs from E. castaneigena (conidiophores to about 90 μm; conidial L/W 1.6–2.8) in having longer conidiophores and higher conidial L/W.

== Host and distribution ==
Known from Azerbaijan on sweet chestnut (Castanea sativa), with confirmed records from the Shaki (Baş Küngüt) and Qabala (Zaraghan) districts based on 2015 collections. Prior to this work, powdery mildew on C. sativa in Azerbaijan had only been recorded as E. alphitoides.
