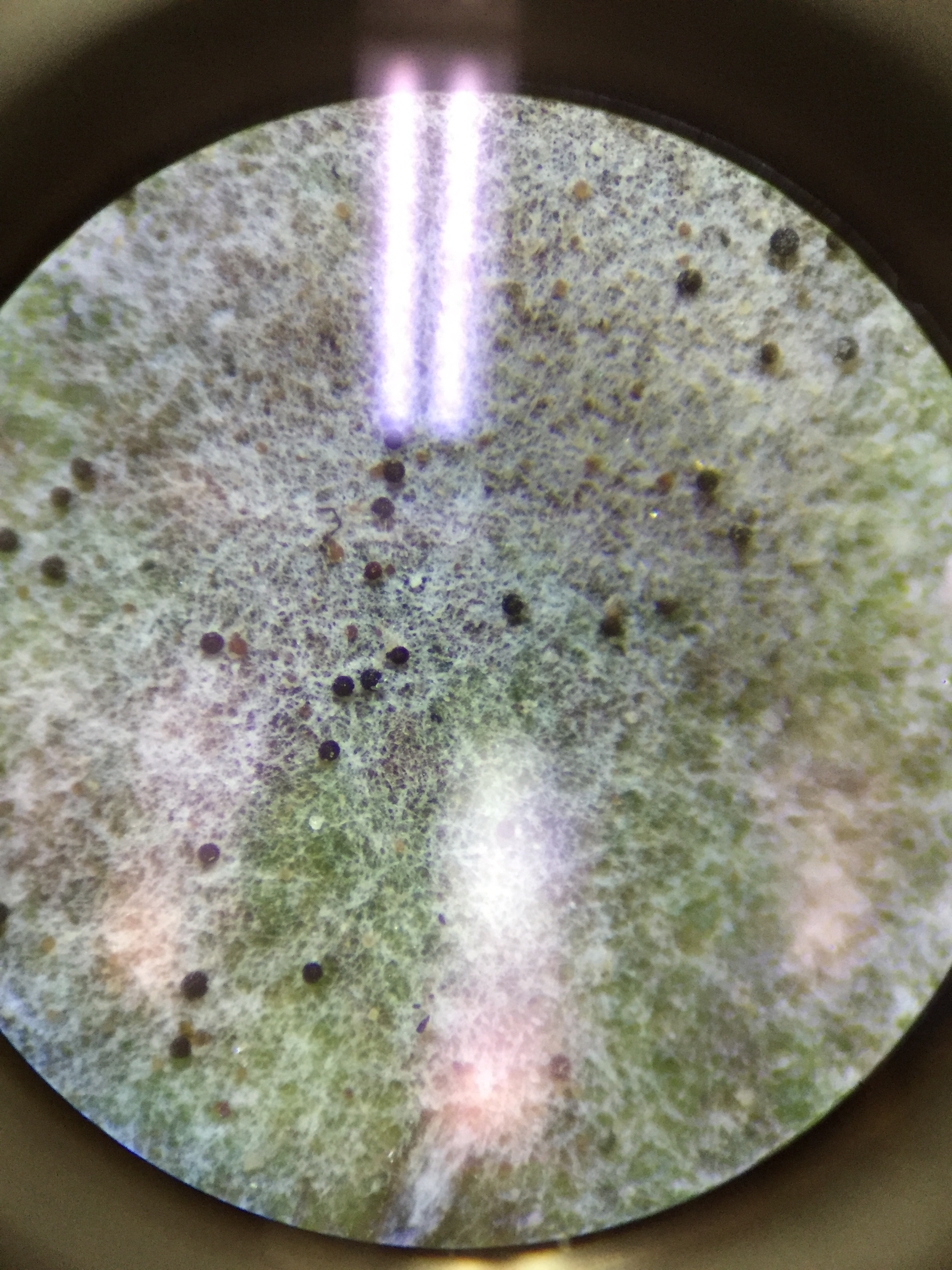
- Image of chasmothecia and mycelial growth through the lens of a dissecting scope

Scientific classification
- Kingdom: Fungi
- Division: Ascomycota
- Class: Leotiomycetes
- Order: Helotiales
- Family: Erysiphaceae
- Genus: Erysiphe
- Species: E. syringae

Binomial name
- Erysiphe syringae Schwein., 1832

Synonyms
- Microsphaera syringae (Schwein.) H.Magn., 1898

= Erysiphe syringae =

Species of fungus

Erysiphe syringae is a fungal pathogen of lilacs (genus Syringa).

== Importance ==
The host of the fungal pathogen, Syringa vulgaris or the common lilac, is an ancient plant with significance in horticultural activities and wild roots in eastern Europe. Its Latin epithet, vulgaris, translates into ‘common’ in English, and was popularized by the pioneer taxonomist Carl von Linné.

One of the first dutiful observations of the pathogen, E. syringae, was made in a journal of the German Botanical Society, Berichte der Deutschen Botanische Gesellschaft, where it was observed as a powdery mildew pathogen unique to lilacs referencing the physical characteristics of its ascocarp appendages.

The pathogen contributes to a deathly and diseased look. Common lilac is known for its spring flowers, which can be altered due to decay of flowering stems after intense infection.

== Symptoms ==
Powdery mildew of lilac leaves an opaque-white discoloration on the leaves of S. vulgaris. This process is predominant at the end of the season but can begin to take place during new growth. Eventually the fungal pathogen contributes to the damaging and early senescing of the infected leaves. The opaque-white discoloration is mycelial growth along the surface of the leaf. When the pathogen is sufficiently advanced, the presence of small dark dots indicates the production of cleistothecium (chasmothecium), an important structure in the protection of potential inoculum.
