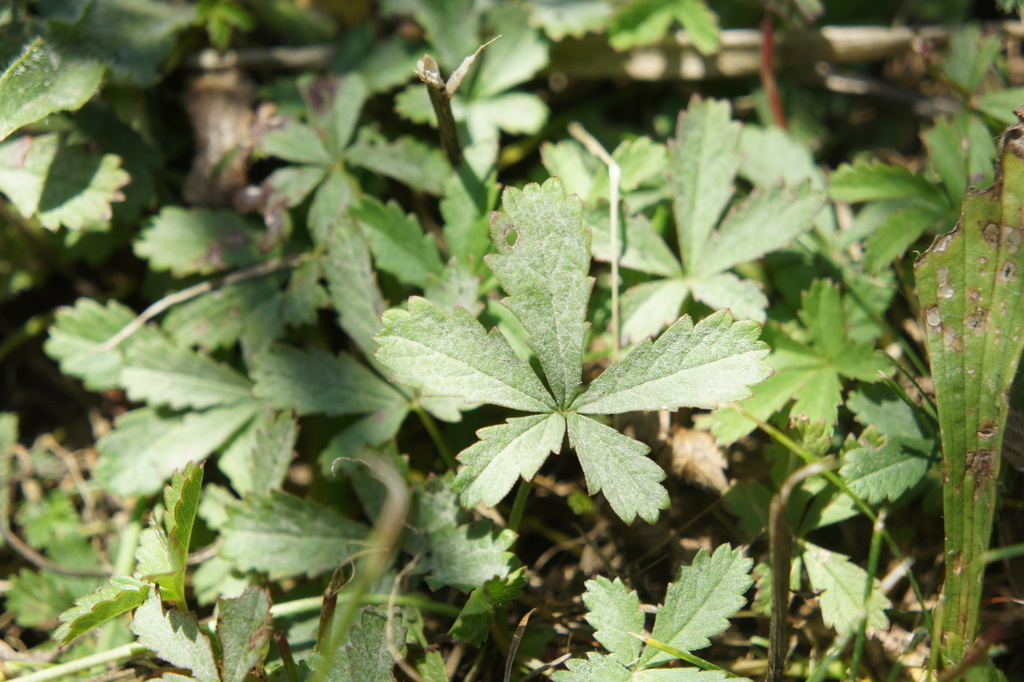

Scientific classification
- Kingdom: Fungi
- Division: Ascomycota
- Class: Leotiomycetes
- Order: Helotiales
- Family: Erysiphaceae
- Genus: Podosphaera
- Species: P. fragariae

Binomial name
- Podosphaera fragariae (Harz) M. Bradshaw & M. Liu, 2025

Synonyms
- Oidium fragariae Harz, 1887

= Podosphaera fragariae =

Fungal pathogen of plants

Podosphaera fragariae is a species of powdery mildew in the family Erysiphaceae. It is found across Eurasia, on plants in the genera Potentilla and Fragaria, including strawberries.

== Description ==
The fungus forms thin, white irregular patches on the leaves of its host. Podosphaera fragariae, like most Erysiphaceae, is highly host-specific and infects only a couple of genera. The species on American species of Potentilla and Fragaria is an undescribed member of the Podosphaera aphanis complex.

== Taxonomy ==
The fungus was formally described in 1887 by Harz with the basionym Oidium fragariae. The new combination Podosphaera fragariae was created by Bradshaw and Liu in 2025. It is a member of the Podosphaera aphanis complex of species and was formally considered conspecific with that species.
