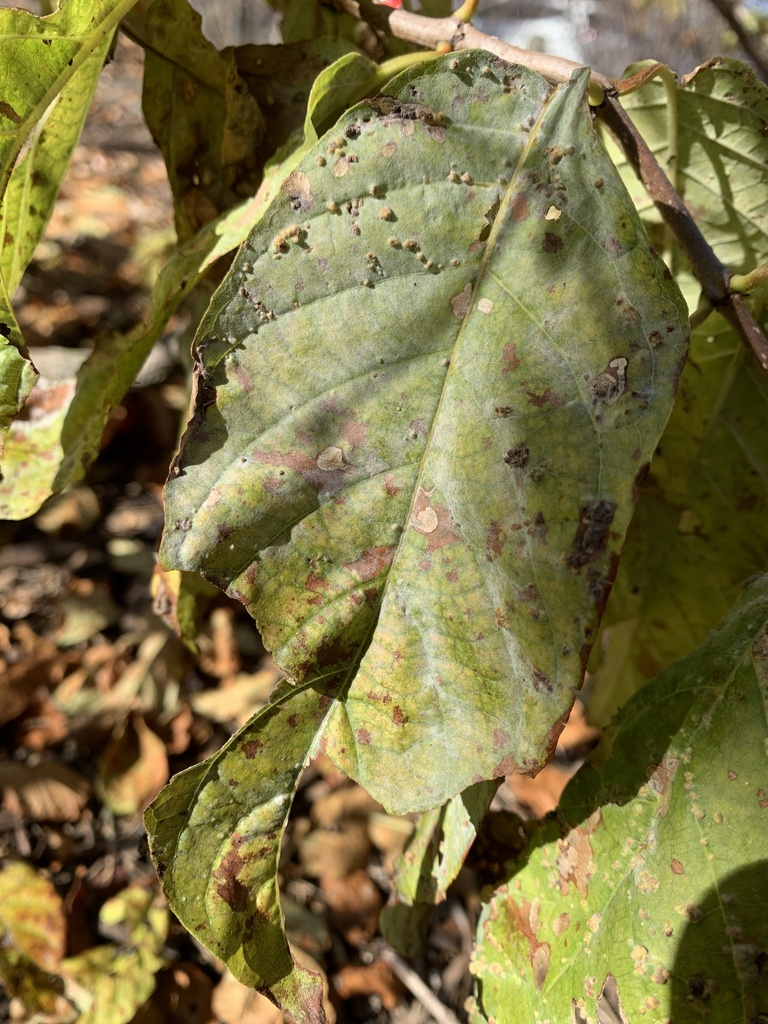

Scientific classification
- Kingdom: Fungi
- Division: Ascomycota
- Class: Leotiomycetes
- Order: Helotiales
- Family: Erysiphaceae
- Genus: Erysiphe
- Species: E. semitosta

Binomial name
- Erysiphe semitosta (Berk. & M.A. Curtis) U. Braun & S. Takam., 2000

Synonyms
- Microsphaera semitosta Berk. & M.A. Curtis, 1857

= Erysiphe semitosta =

Species of fungus

Erysiphe semitosta is a species of powdery mildew in the family Erysiphaceae. It is found across North America, where it affects buttonbush plants (genus Cephalanthus).

== Description ==
The fungus forms thin, white irregular patches on the leaves of its host, mainly on the upperside. Multiple other species have also been reported from Cephalanthus, including Ovulariopsis cephalanthi, which has thick mycelium in large dense patches growing to cover the undersides of leaves and causing brownish yellow lesions; and Pseudoidium cephalanthi, thinly spreading on both sides of leaves.

== Taxonomy ==
The fungus was formally described as a new species in 1857 by Berkeley and M.A. Curtis with the basionym Microsphaera semitosta. It was transferred to the genus Erysiphe by Braun and Takamatsu in 2000.
