= Erysiphe digitata =

Scientific classification
- Kingdom: Fungi
- Division: Ascomycota
- Class: Leotiomycetes
- Order: Erysiphales
- Family: Erysiphaceae
- Genus: Erysiphe
- Species: E. digitata

Binomial name
- Erysiphe digitata (A.J. Inman & U. Braun) A.J. Inman & U. Braun, 2000

Species of fungus

Erysiphe digitata is a species of powdery mildew in the family Erysiphaceae. It is native to Asia and has been introduced elsewhere including Europe and North America, where it affects plants in the genus Rhododendron.

== Description ==
The fungus forms whitish robust patches on the undersides of leaves of mainly evergreen rhododendrons. Erysiphe digitata, like most Erysiphaceae, is highly host-specific and infects only the genus Rhododendron.

== Taxonomy ==
The fungus was formally described in 2000 by A.J. Inman and U. Braun. The type specimen was collected in Belgium, on Rhododendron mekongense var. melinanthum, with the basionym Microsphaera digitata. The species was transferred to the genus Erysiphe by the same authors later the same year. Tymon et al. (2022) provided an ex-holotype sequence of this species, clarified the phylogenetic affinity, and demonstrated that this species with Asian origin has been introduced in the United States on evergreen Rhododendron spp.
