= Erysiphe acantholimonis =

Scientific classification
- Kingdom: Fungi
- Division: Ascomycota
- Class: Leotiomycetes
- Order: Helotiales
- Family: Erysiphaceae
- Genus: Erysiphe
- Species: E. acantholimonis

Binomial name
- Erysiphe acantholimonis J.G. Song, B. Xu & H.D. Shin, 2016

Species of fungus

Erysiphe acantholimonis is a species of powdery mildew in the family Erysiphaceae. It is found in Asia, where it affects plants in the genus Acantholimon.

== Description ==
The fungus forms thin, white irregular patches on the leaves of its host. Erysiphe acantholimonis, like most Erysiphaceae, is highly host-specific and infects only Acantholimon.

== Taxonomy ==
The fungus was formally described in 2016 by J.G. Song, B. Xu and H.D. Shin. The species epithet refers to the host genus, Acantholimon. The type specimen was collected in China on Acantholimon hedinii. Braun and Cook (2012) treated Erysiphe communis f. acantholimonis Koshk., described from Turkmenistan on Acantholimon avenaceum, as a synonym of E. limonii. This forma might be a synonym of E. acantholinonis, but this requires confirmation by results of sequence analyses.
