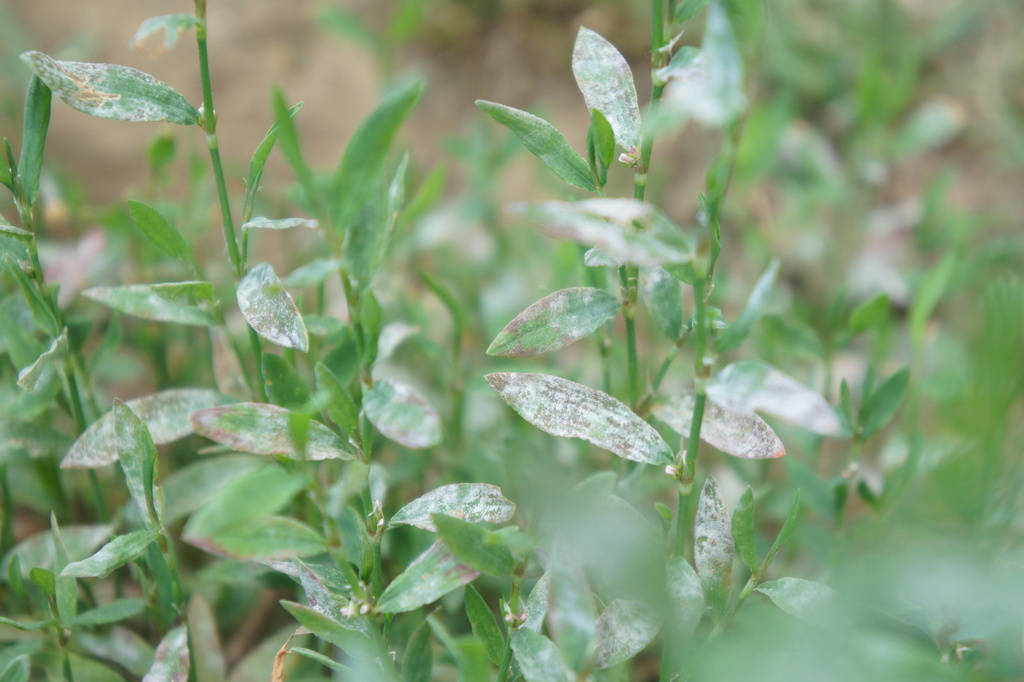

Scientific classification
- Kingdom: Fungi
- Division: Ascomycota
- Class: Leotiomycetes
- Order: Helotiales
- Family: Erysiphaceae
- Genus: Erysiphe
- Species: E. polygoni

Binomial name
- Erysiphe polygoni DC., 1805

Synonyms
- Microsphaera polygoni (DC.) Sawada, 1914; Ischnochaeta polygoni (DC.) Sawada, 1959; Erysiphe communis var. ranunculacearum Link, 1824; Oidium antigononis B.S. Reddy, Khalis & Manohar., 1982; Pseudoidium antigononis (B.S. Reddy, Khalis & Manohar.) U. Braun & R.T.A. Cook, 2012; Alphitomorpha communis Wallr., 1819; Tigria leveillei Trevis., 1853; Albigo communis (Wallr.) Reum, 1883; Erysiphe cichoracearum f. muehlenbeckiae Nelen, 1966

= Erysiphe polygoni =

Species of fungus

Erysiphe polygoni is a species of powdery mildew in the family Erysiphaceae. It is found across the globe, where it affects Antigonon, Muehlenbeckia, and Polygonum (sensu lato).

== Description ==
The fungus forms diffuse white patches on the leaves of its host. Erysiphe polygoni, like most Erysiphaceae, is fairly host-specific and infects only members of a few genera.

== Taxonomy ==
The fungus was formally described in 1805 by de Candolle. The type specimen was collected in France, on Polygonum aviculare. The specific epithet derives from the type host. The species was formally rather broadly defined but has since been split, meaning records formerly assigned to E. polygoni are now assigned to other species. On Rumex subg. Rumex the species E. rumicicola can be found, while on Rumex subg. Acetosa, the species is E. acetosae.
