= Erysiphe flexuosa =

Scientific classification
- Kingdom: Fungi
- Division: Ascomycota
- Class: Leotiomycetes
- Order: Helotiales
- Family: Erysiphaceae
- Genus: Erysiphe
- Species: E. flexuosa

Binomial name
- Erysiphe flexuosa (Peck) U. Braun & S. Takam., (2000)

Synonyms
- Uncinula flexuosa Peck, (1872); Uncinuliella flexuosa (Peck) U. Braun, (1981)

Species of fungus

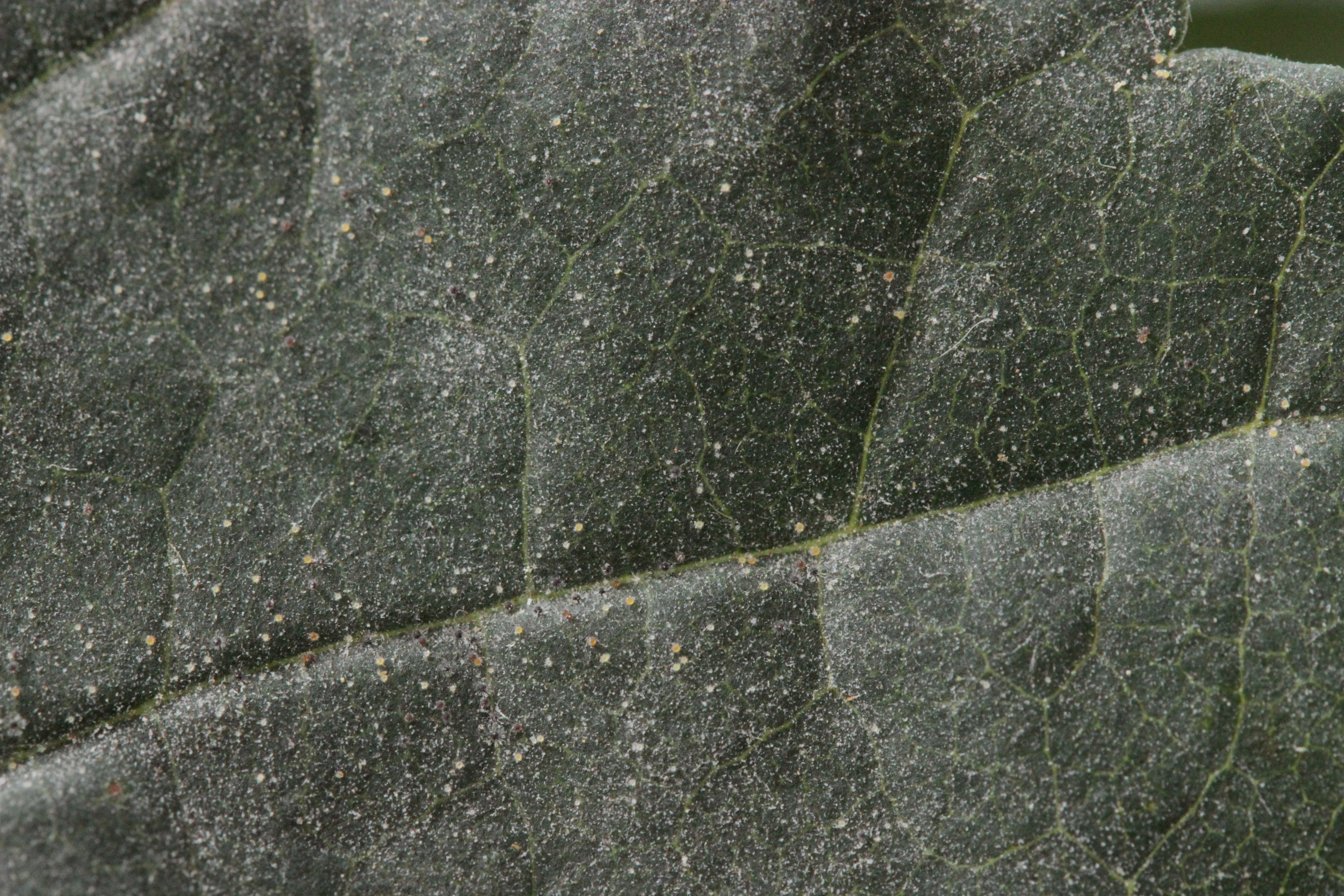
Erysiphe flexuosa on horse chestnut

Erysiphe flexuosa is a plant pathogen that causes powdery mildew on horse chestnut. It is native to North America but is currently spreading epidemically through Europe.
