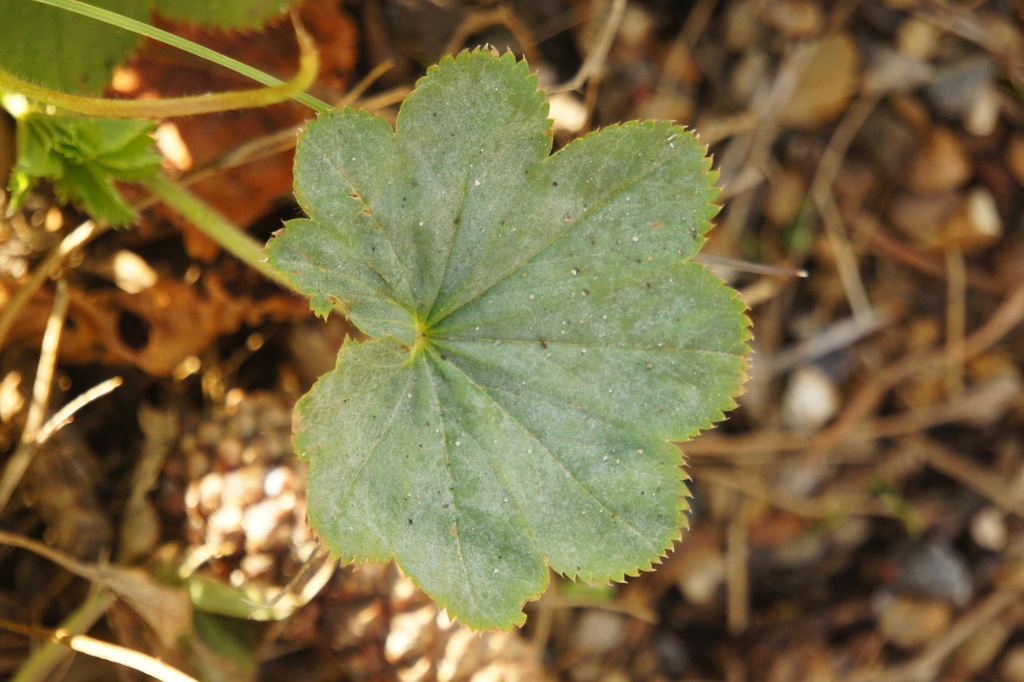

Scientific classification
- Kingdom: Fungi
- Division: Ascomycota
- Class: Leotiomycetes
- Order: Helotiales
- Family: Erysiphaceae
- Genus: Podosphaera
- Species: P. aphanis

Binomial name
- Podosphaera aphanis (Wallr.) U. Braun & S. Takam., 2000

Synonyms
- Sphaerotheca aphanis (Wallr.) U. Braun, 1982; Erysiphe potentillae Lib., 1834; Sphaerotheca alchemillae (J. Steiner) Erikss., 1928

= Podosphaera aphanis =

Species of fungus

Podosphaera aphanis is a species complex of powdery mildews in the family Erysiphaceae. It is found across the world, wherever the host plants are found. Podosphaera aphanis sensu stricto is only found on Alchemilla.

== Description ==
The fungus forms thin, white irregular patches on the leaves of its host. Podosphaera aphanis, like most Erysiphaceae, is highly host-specific and P. aphanis infects only one genus.

== Taxonomy ==
The fungus was formally described in 1819 by Wallroth with the basionym Alphitomorpha aphanis. It was transferred to the genus Podosphaera by Braun and Takamatsu in 2000. The Podosphaera aphanis complex was split in 2025, creating multiple new species: Podosphaera rubi-spectabilis, infecting Rubus spectablilis and R. ursinus; Podosphaera ruborum, infecting other Rubus species; Podosphaera fragariae, infecting Eurasian Potentilla and Fragaria; and Podosphaera septentrionalis, infecting North American Geum and Agrimonia. The species on North American Potentilla and Fragaria and Eurasian Geum and Agrimonia (along with the species on Comarum) remain unresolved.
