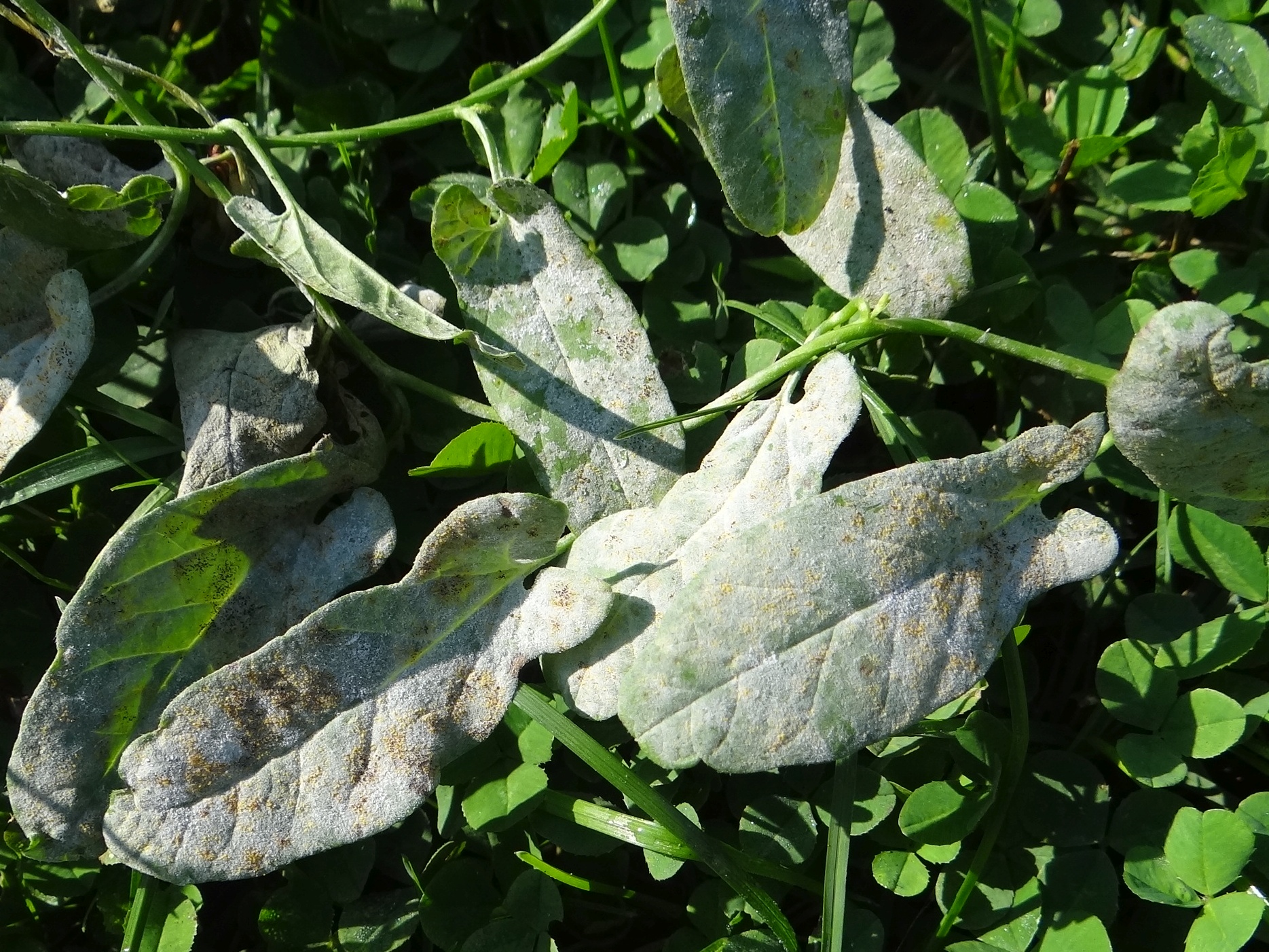

Scientific classification
- Kingdom: Fungi
- Division: Ascomycota
- Class: Leotiomycetes
- Order: Helotiales
- Family: Erysiphaceae
- Genus: Erysiphe
- Species: E. convolvuli

Binomial name
- Erysiphe convolvuli DC., 1805

Synonyms
- Alphitomorpha communis var. convolvulacearum Wallr., 1819; Erysiphe convolvuli-sepii Castagne, 1845

= Erysiphe convolvuli =

Plant pathogenic species of fungus

Erysiphe convolvuli is a species of powdery mildew in the family Erysiphaceae. It is found across the world, where it affects bindweeds (Calystegia and Convolvulus) and has been reported from morning-glory plants (Ipomoea).

== Description ==
The fungus forms thin, white irregular patches on the leaves of its host. Erysiphe convolvuli, like most Erysiphaceae, is highly host-specific and infects only plants from a few genera, namely Convolvulus and Calystegia. There is also a record from Ipomoea, which was reported as Erysiphe convolvuli but may be an unknown but closely-related species.

== Taxonomy ==
The fungus was formally described in 1805 by De Candolle. The type specimen was collected by himself in France.
