= Erysiphe diffusa =

Scientific classification
- Kingdom: Fungi
- Division: Ascomycota
- Class: Leotiomycetes
- Order: Helotiales
- Family: Erysiphaceae
- Genus: Erysiphe
- Species: E. diffusa

Binomial name
- Erysiphe diffusa (Cooke & Peck) U. Braun & S. Takam., 2000

Synonyms
- Trichocladia diffusa Jacz., 1927; Microsphaera diffusa Cooke & Peck, 1872

Species of fungus

Erysiphe diffusa is a fungal plant pathogen that is known to cause powdery mildew on multiple host genera, including soybeans. It has been recorded as a likely accidental infection on papaya, along with its usual host genera which include Glycine, Desmodium, Hylodesmum, Apios, Psoralea, Glycyrrhiza and Desmanthus. The species was formerly known as Microsphaera diffusa.

== Importance ==
Powdery mildew is a significant pathogen of soybeans and tends to cause epidemics about every 10–15 years in Wisconsin. The first epidemic there was observed in 1975 and several have occurred since. When 82% of the soybean leaf area is covered by E. diffusa, photosynthetic and transpiration rates are less than half of normal soybeans, thus affecting soybean yield. Different studies have found varying amounts of yield reduction due to powdery mildew. In Illinois, measured yield losses ranged up to 14 percent. Studies from Iowa recorded yield losses of up to an estimated 10 bushels per acre. In Wisconsin, yield loss was up to 5 bushels per acre. Yield loss due to powdery mildew will be greater for soybeans planted late for a region compared to early-planted soybeans.

== Environment ==
Temperature plays an important role in powdery mildew development. Powdery mildew develops favorably in cooler temperatures (65–77 °F). Temperatures above 30 °C appear to constrain disease development. Rainfall does not appear to affect the disease, but it has been found that a shorter leaf wetness duration appears to be a driver of the disease. Additionally, low relative humidity is required for disease development.

== Management ==
Variety selection is a tool that can be used to help combat powdery mildew. No variety of soybean has complete resistance to powdery mildew, but some varieties are clearly more susceptible than others. Resistance affects initial inoculation of the plant.

Fungicides may also be used as a management tool. They can be sprayed once powdery mildew is detected to kill the spores. This affects the dispersal and secondary inoculation of the plant. Some examples of fungicides include Topsin M, Quadris, and Headline, with the last two being less effective.

Another management practice is the planting date. Early-planted soybeans tend to show less severity of powdery mildew than late-planted soybeans.
