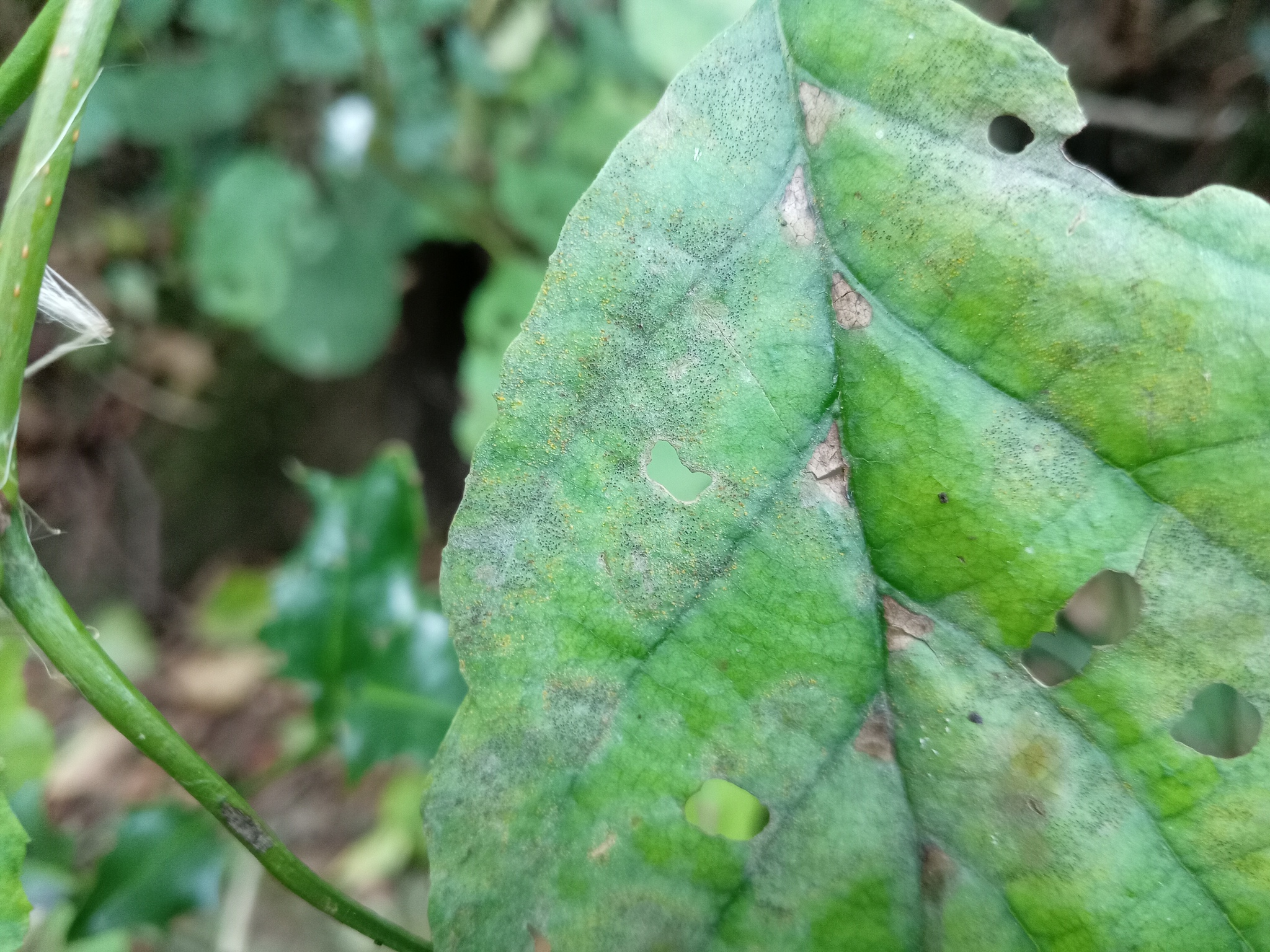
- Erysiphe penicillata on Alnus glutinosa

Scientific classification
- Kingdom: Fungi
- Division: Ascomycota
- Class: Leotiomycetes
- Order: Helotiales
- Family: Erysiphaceae
- Genus: Erysiphe
- Species: E. penicillata

Binomial name
- Erysiphe penicillata Schltdl., 1824

Synonyms
- Alphitomorpha penicillata Wallr., 1819; Microsphaera penicillata (Schltdl.) Cooke, 1865

= Erysiphe penicillata =

Species of fungus

Erysiphe penicillata is a species of powdery mildew in the family Erysiphaceae. It is distributed widely across Europe and is also known from Iran, where it infects species of the genus Alnus (alders). It was previously considered to have a much wider host and geographical range.

== Description ==
The fungus forms thin, white irregular patches on the leaves of its host. Erysiphe penicillata, like most Erysiphaceae, is highly host-specific and only infects one genus. Other species also occur on Alnus, including Phyllactinia alnicola in the native range of Erysiphe penicillata. Elsewhere, other similar species occur including Erysiphe alnicola, which was itself split from E. penicillata.

== Taxonomy ==
There has been much historical confusion over the correct name and author attribution for Erysiphe penicillata, with various authors introducing different names for the species, sometimes based on misunderstanding over what species material even represented. The correct denomination for the species was eventually determined to be Erysiphe penicillata Schltdl. nom. sanct. The specific epithet may be derived from the Latin penicillus, meaning a brush.
