= Baş Küngüt =

- Municipality
- Location within Azerbaijan Location within Shaki-Zagatala Economic Region
- Coordinates: 41°10′13″N 47°19′56″E
- Country: Azerbaijan
- Rayon: Shaki

Population
  - Total: 1,381
- Time zone: UTC+4 (AZT)
  - Summer (DST): UTC+5 (AZT)

Baş Küngüt (also, Bash-Kyungyut) is a village and municipality in the Shaki district of Azerbaijan. It has a population of 1,381.

The etymology of the name Küngüt in the name of the village comes from the name of the country Kang (Kangar), with a Sogdian plural suffix -t, expressed in the ancient Chinese annals as Guniue.
