= Erysiphe abeliae =

Scientific classification
- Kingdom: Fungi
- Division: Ascomycota
- Class: Leotiomycetes
- Order: Helotiales
- Family: Erysiphaceae
- Genus: Erysiphe
- Species: E. abeliae

Binomial name
- Erysiphe abeliae R.Y. Zheng & G.Q. Chen, 1980

Species of fungus

Erysiphe abeliae is a species of powdery mildew in the family Erysiphaceae. It is found in China, where it affects plants in the genus Abelia.

== Description ==
The fungus forms effuse patches of mycelium on the leaves of its host. Its chasmothecia are said to be densely gregarious on stems. As with most Erysiphaceae, Erysiphe abeliae is highly host-specific and infects exclusively plants in the genus Abelia. Only one other species of powdery mildew is now considered to be found on the same host genus: Erysiphe abeliana, which has only been recorded on cultivated Abelia × grandiflora in North America and Europe.

== Taxonomy ==
The fungus was formally described in 1980 by R.Y. Zheng and G.Q. Chen. The species is only known from the type collection. The type specimen was collected in Sichuan Province, China in 1958. The specific epithet refers to the host genus. Erysiphe abeliae should not be confused with Microsphaera abeliae, which is a synonym for Erysiphe abeliicola.

== Micromorphology ==
=== Description ===
The mycelium is specifically reported as infecting the stem of its host. It is effuse or typically in patches, bearing scattered or clustered chasmothecia (fruiting bodies), which are particularly gregarious on the stems. Chasmothecial appendages are numerous in the lower half of the chasmothecium (between 10–40), with a fairly simple structure that is at first rather straight before becoming sinuous further towards the tip. The colouration also changes, with an at first light brown colour paling towards the tips. Appendage tips are usually rounded but can be uncinate or circinate. Erysiphe abeliae has six to eight spores per ascus which are roughly ellipsoid and yellowish. The asci are typically saccate and are either subsessile or short-stalked.

=== Measurements ===
Conidia, conidiophores and appressoria were not recorded by Zheng and Chen. The chasmothecia are (85–)95–120 μm in diameter when mature with peridium cells 5–20 μm in diameter. Appendages are up to 2 or 3× the diameter of the chasmothecia and (4–)4.5–5.5(–6) μm wide. Asci number 4–8 and are 40–60 × 30–40(–60) μm with ascospores measuring 17.5–20(–25) × (10–)11–14 μm.
