= Erysiphe baliensis =

Scientific classification
- Kingdom: Fungi
- Division: Ascomycota
- Class: Leotiomycetes
- Order: Erysiphales
- Family: Erysiphaceae
- Genus: Erysiphe
- Species: E. baliensis

Binomial name
- Erysiphe baliensis Siahaan & S. Takam., 2015

Species of fungus

Erysiphe baliensis is a species of powdery mildew in the family Erysiphaceae. It is found in Asia, where it affects plants in the genera Gliricidia and Wisteria.

== Description ==
The fungus forms thin, white irregular patches on the leaves of its host. Erysiphe baliensis, like most Erysiphaceae, is fairly host-specific and infects only two genera of plants.

== Taxonomy ==
The fungus was formally described in 2015 by Siahaan and S. Takamatsu. The species epithet refers to Bali, the island from which the type specimen was collected. The type host is Gliricidia sepium. The description of this species was based on anamorphs and chasmothecia are not yet known.
