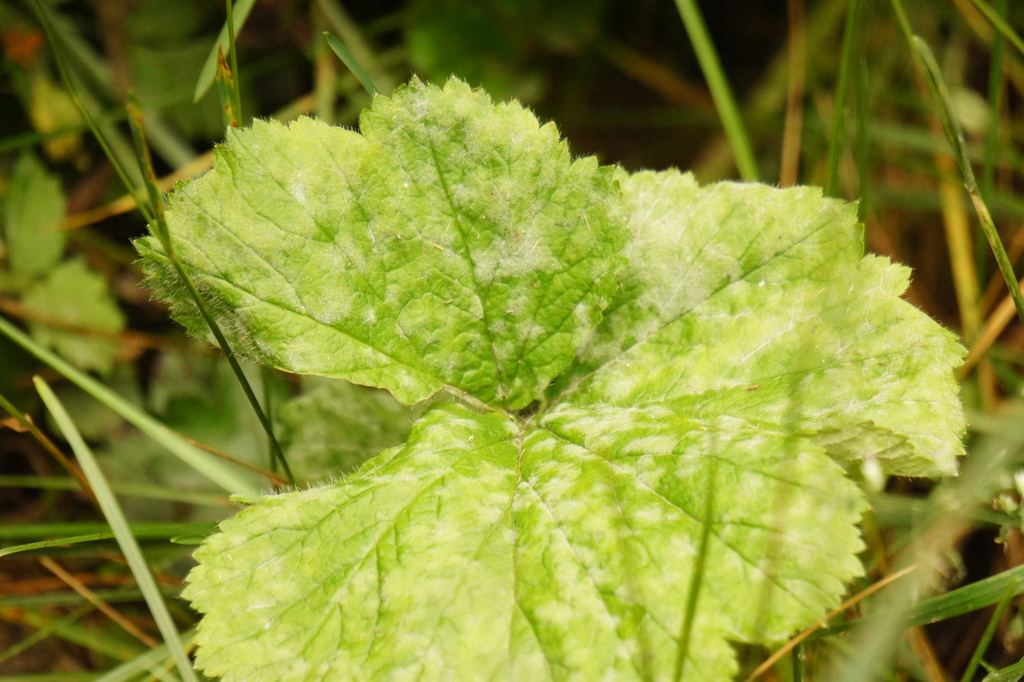

Scientific classification
- Kingdom: Fungi
- Division: Ascomycota
- Class: Leotiomycetes
- Order: Helotiales
- Family: Erysiphaceae
- Genus: Podosphaera
- Species: P. septentrionalis

Binomial name
- Podosphaera septentrionalis M. Bradshaw & M. Liu, 2025

= Podosphaera septentrionalis =

Species of mildew

Podosphaera septentrionalis is a species of powdery mildew in the family Erysiphaceae. It is found across North America, on native plants in the genera Agrimonia and Geum.

== Description ==
The fungus forms thin, white irregular patches on the leaves of its host. Podosphaera septentrionalis, like most Erysiphaceae, is highly host-specific and infects only a couple of genera. The species on European species of Agrimonia and Geum is an undescribed member of the Podosphaera aphanis complex.

== Taxonomy ==
The fungus was formally described in 2025 by Bradshaw and Liu. It is a member of the Podosphaera aphanis complex of species and was formally considered conspecific with that species.
