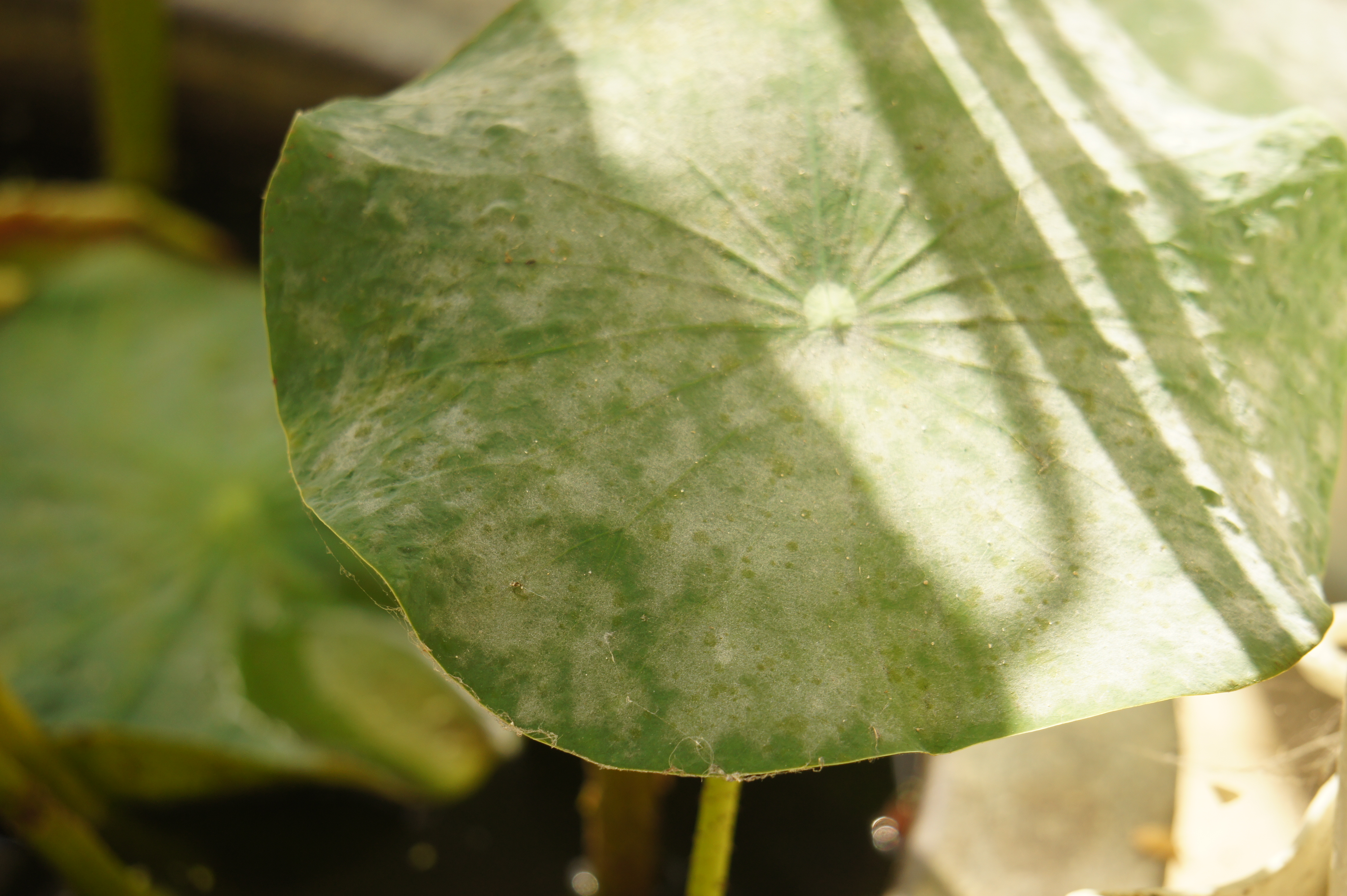

Scientific classification
- Kingdom: Fungi
- Division: Ascomycota
- Class: Leotiomycetes
- Order: Erysiphales
- Family: Erysiphaceae
- Genus: Erysiphe
- Species: E. takamatsui

Binomial name
- Erysiphe takamatsui Y. Nomura, 1997

= Erysiphe takamatsui =

Species of fungus

Erysiphe takamatsui is a species of powdery mildew in the family Erysiphaceae. It is found across Eurasia, where it affects lotus plants (genus Nelumbo).

== Description ==
The fungus forms thin, white irregular patches on the leaves of its host. One other species has been reported from Nelumbo: Erysiphe magnifica, from a botanical garden in Germany.

== History ==
The fungus was formally described as a new species in 1999 by Nomura based on a specimen collected in 1974 by Susumu Takamatsu. Since the first record of this species on Nelumbo nucifera in a lotus pond of Hakusan Shrine, Niigata-shi, Japan, it has spread: first to elsewhere in East Asia and then (likely due to the botanical garden trade) to such gardens in multiple countries in Europe.
