= Erysiphe abeliicola =

Scientific classification
- Kingdom: Fungi
- Division: Ascomycota
- Class: Leotiomycetes
- Order: Helotiales
- Family: Erysiphaceae
- Genus: Erysiphe
- Species: E. abeliicola

Binomial name
- Erysiphe abeliicola U. Braun & S. Takam., 2000

Synonyms
- Microsphaera abeliae Homma, 1937

Species of fungus

Erysiphe abeliicola is a species of powdery mildew in the family Erysiphaceae. It is found in Japan, where it affects Diabelia.

== Description ==
The fungus forms effuse patches of mycelium on the leaves of its host. Erysiphe abeliicola, like most Erysiphaceae, is highly host-specific and infects only Diabelia. It is only known from Japan.

== Taxonomy ==
The fungus was formally described in 1937 by Homma with the basionym Microsphaera abeliae. The species was transferred to the genus Erysiphe by Braun and Takamatsu in 2000, who gave it the new combination Erysiphe abeliicola, as Erysiphe abeliae had already been described and referred to a different species.
