= Erysiphe chifengensis =

Scientific classification
- Kingdom: Fungi
- Division: Ascomycota
- Class: Leotiomycetes
- Order: Helotiales
- Family: Erysiphaceae
- Genus: Erysiphe
- Species: E. chifengensis

Binomial name
- Erysiphe chifengensis T.Z. Liu & U. Braun, 2006

Species of fungus

Erysiphe chifengensis is a species of powdery mildew in the family Erysiphaceae. It is found in central Asia, where it affects plants in the genus Zabelia.

== Description ==
The fungus forms thin white patches of mycelium on the leaves of its host. Erysiphe chifengensis, like most Erysiphaceae, is highly host-specific and infects only Zabelia biflora. It is only known from China.

== Taxonomy ==
The fungus was formally described in 2006 by T.Z. Liu and Uwe Braun. The specific epithet refers to the city Chifeng in China.
