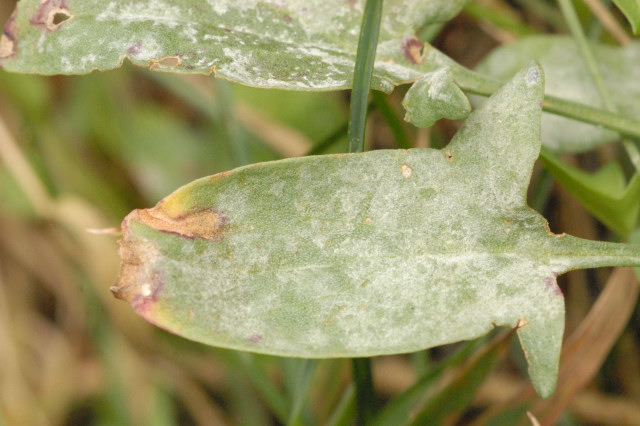

Scientific classification
- Kingdom: Fungi
- Division: Ascomycota
- Class: Leotiomycetes
- Order: Helotiales
- Family: Erysiphaceae
- Genus: Erysiphe
- Species: E. betae

Binomial name
- Erysiphe betae (Vaňha) Weltzien, 1963

Synonyms
- Erysiphe betae var. spinaciarum Y.S. Paul & V.K. Thakur, 2006; Erysiphe communis f. betae Jacz., 1927; Microsphaera betae Vaňha, 1903

= Erysiphe betae =

Species of fungus

Erysiphe betae is a fungal plant pathogen. It is a species of powdery mildew found on genera including Beta, Dysphania and Spinacia that can affect crops of sugar beet, potentially causing up to a 30% yield loss. The fungus occurs worldwide in all regions where sugar beet is grown and it also infects other edible crops, e.g. beetroot.

== Identification ==
Symptoms of E. betae are typical for species in the family, causing white powdery growth on leaves and stems of affected plants. It is the only powdery mildew species known from its hosts.

== Disease symptoms ==
- Symptoms appear as dirty white, circular, floury patches on either sides of the leaves.
- Under favourable environmental conditions, entire leaves, stems, floral parts and pods are affected.
- The whole leaf may be covered with powdery mass.
- If persistent, mild chlorosis or necrosis can also occur.

== Survival and spread ==
The pathogen survives overwinter through cleistothecia which are present in crop debris in the field and which contain ascospores (sexual spores). Infection occurs when ascospores or conidia (asexual spores) are able to germinate and penetrate the plant's leaf. After infection, the pathogen, now growing as hyphae within the leaf, begins producing conidia on short conidiophores. Both ascospores and conidia can be the source of a primary inoculum or "first infection". The production of which type of spore is determined by weather conditions and time of year. Conidia can travel long distances through the air.

== Favourable conditions ==
Disease development is favored by high temperatures (15-28 °C) coupled with low humidity (<60% humidity), and low or no rainfall, with wind.

== Description ==
This fungus, like all powdery mildews, has a white powdery appearance. It appears on leaves in the summer time. Infection normally begins on older leaves, typically close to the junction between the lamina and petiole, and it develops on both ab- and adaxial surfaces.

== Pathogenicity ==
This pathogen decreases yields in crops by the reduction of light available for photosynthesis in the leaves of plants. It also causes leaf and shoot deformities. This will affect the yield and the quality of seed crops as well as visual appearance and quality of leaf crops. In the case of Erysiphe betae, entry into the cell involves both mechanical penetration and enzymatic degradation of the cuticle and the cell wall.

== Plant defenses ==
The fungus can produce some cell wall degrading enzymes include pectin lyases and polygalacturonases. Plants can contain an array of specialized inhibitors that counteract the effects of these enzymes.

== Methods of control ==
In the case of control against Erysiphe betae, not much is known about how to totally eradicate this disease once it has taken hold of the crop. It must therefore be assumed that the best method of control is prevention. This can be done using fungicides. Some genes have been identified in wild species.

== Other sources ==
- Dr. Alan J. Silverside (2002, September). Erysiphe cichoracearum DC. var. cichoracearum. Retrieved November 4, 2007 from, Website: https://web.archive.org/web/20080208144943/http://www-biol.paisley.ac.uk/bioref/Fungi_ascomycetes/Erysiphe_cichoracearum.html
- Robin Philippe (n.a.). Powdery mildew. Retrieved November 4, 2007 from, Web site: http://www.inra.fr/hyp3/pathogene/6erybet.htm
