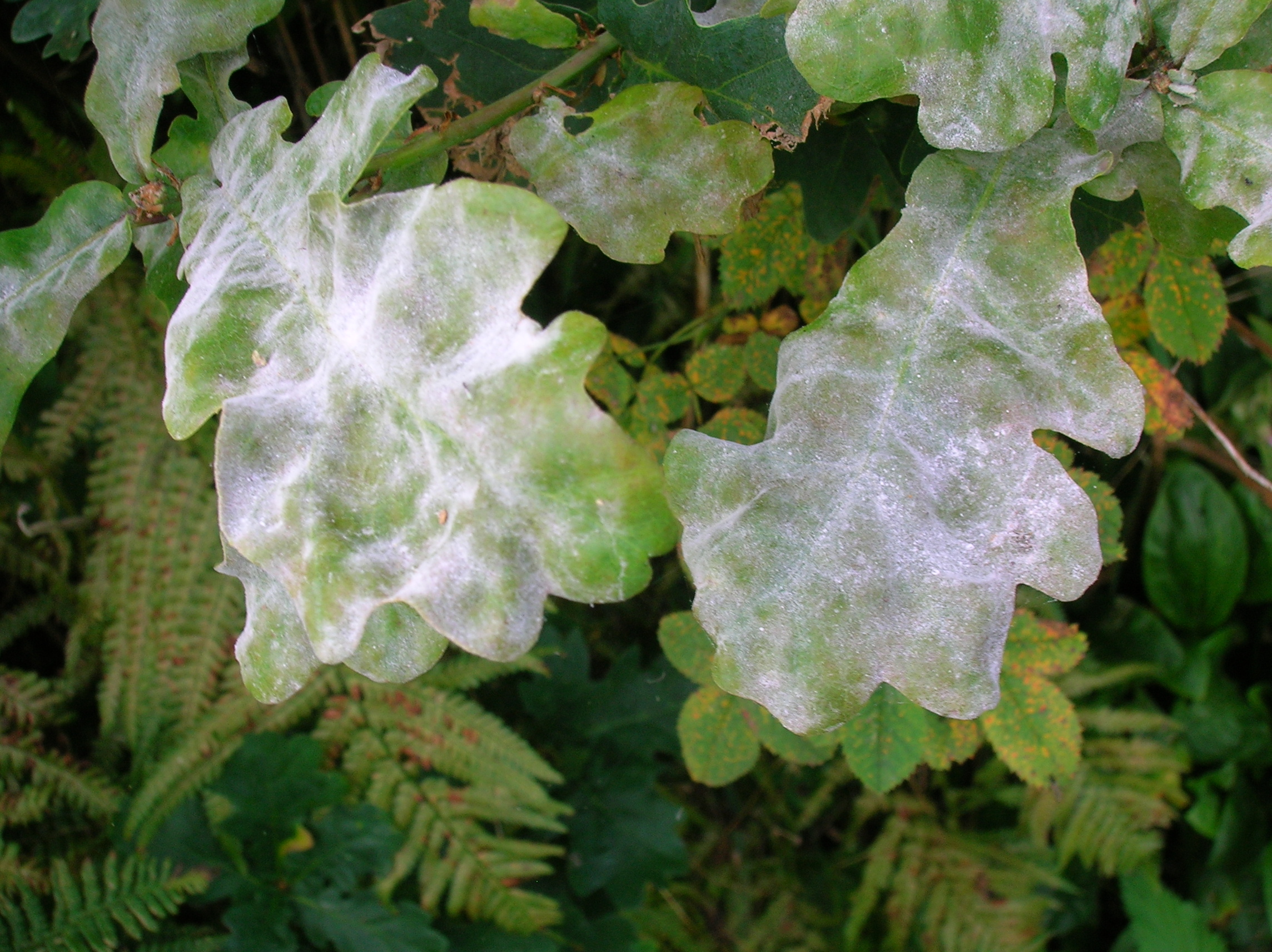
- An Erysiphe species on a Quercus leaf.

Scientific classification
- Kingdom: Fungi
- Division: Ascomycota
- Class: Leotiomycetes
- Order: Helotiales
- Family: Erysiphaceae
- Genus: Erysiphe; R.Hedw. ex DC., 1805

Type species
- Erysiphe polygoni DC., 1805

Synonyms
- Alphitomorpha Wallr. 1819; Erysibe Wallr. 1833; Uncinula Lév. 1851; Calocladia Lév. 1851; Tigria Trevis. 1853; Erysiphella Peck 1876; Uncinulella Hara 1936; Orthochaeta Sawada 1943; Linkomyces Golovin 1958; Ischnochaeta Sawada 1959; Salmonomyces Chidd. 1959; Medusosphaera Golovin & Gamalizk. 1962; Bulbouncinula R.Y. Zheng & G.Q. Chen 1979; Uncinuliella R.Y. Zheng & G.Q. Chen 1979; Furcouncinula Z.X. Chen 1982; Setoerysiphe Y. Nomura 1984; Bulbomicrosphaera A.Q. Wang 1987

= Erysiphe =

Genus of fungi

Erysiphe is a genus of plant pathogenic fungi in the family Erysiphaceae. The species in this genus are known for causing powdery mildew.

== Species ==
- Erysiphe abeliae R.Y. Zheng & G.Q. Chen, 1980
- Erysiphe abeliana Bolay & U. Braun, 2021
- Erysiphe abeliicola U. Braun & S. Takam., 2000
- Erysiphe acantholimonis J.G. Song, B. Xu & H.D. Shin, 2016
- Erysiphe aesculi-sylvaticae Andr. Paul & M. Bradshaw, 2025
- Erysiphe alliariicola M. Bradshaw & U. Braun, 2024
- Erysiphe alphitoides (Griffon & Maubl.) U. Braun & S. Takam., 2000
- Erysiphe azerbaijanica Abasova, Aghayeva & S.Takam., 2018
- Erysiphe baliensis Siahaan & S. Takam., 2015
- Erysiphe betae (Vaňha) Weltzien, 1963
- Erysiphe biuncinata (Cooke & Peck) M. Bradshaw, U. Braun & Pfister, 2024
- Erysiphe chifengensis T.Z. Liu & U. Braun, 2006
- Erysiphe convolvuli DC., 1805
- Erysiphe cruciferarum Opiz ex L. Junell, 1967
- Erysiphe diffusa (Cooke & Peck) U. Braun & S. Takam., 2000
- Erysiphe digitata (A.J. Inman & U. Braun) A.J. Inman & U. Braun, 2000
- Erysiphe euphorbiae-cotinifoliae Fern.-Pav. & S. Takam., 2024
- Erysiphe frickii Neger, 1899
- Erysiphe heraclei DC., 1815
- Erysiphe necator Schwein., 1832
- Erysiphe passiflorae (Politis) M. Bradshaw, U. Braun & Pfister, 2023
- Erysiphe penicillata Schltdl., 1824
- Erysiphe polygoni DC., 1805
- Erysiphe radulescui Docea, 1968
- Erysiphe semitosta (Berk. & M.A. Curtis) U. Braun & S. Takam., 2000
- Erysiphe takamatsui Y. Nomura, 1997
