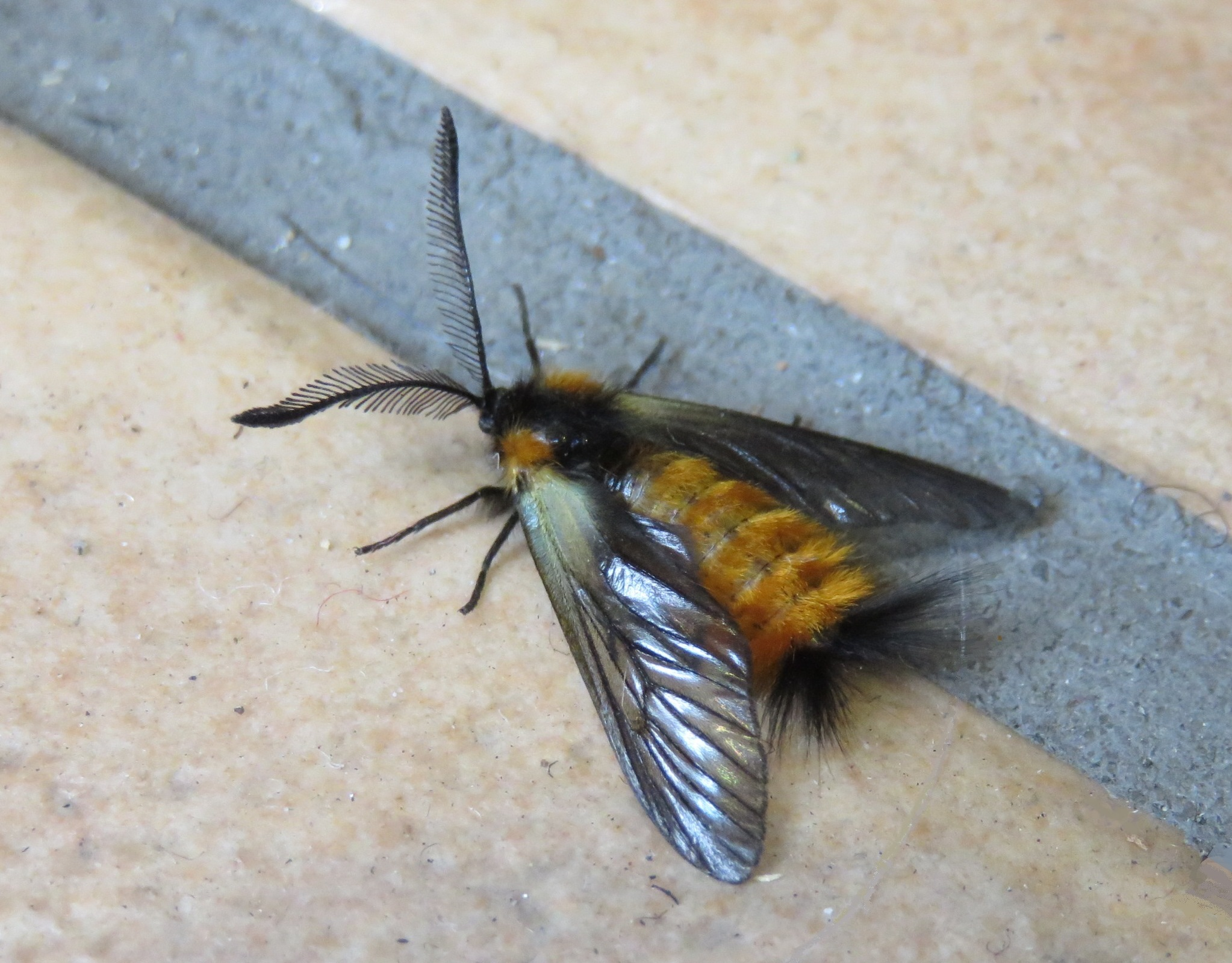
- Adult

Scientific classification
- Kingdom: Animalia
- Phylum: Arthropoda
- Class: Insecta
- Order: Lepidoptera
- Family: Zygaenidae
- Genus: Pryeria
- Species: P. sinica

Binomial name
- Pryeria sinica Moore, 1877

Synonyms
- Sinica sinica

= Pryeria sinica =

Species of moth

Pryeria sinica, the euonymus defoliator moth is a species of moth of the Zygaenidae family. It is native to Asia and has been introduced in the United States, where it has been found in Maryland and Virginia.

The larvae feed on Euonymus and Celastrus species, including Euonymus alatus, Euonymus japonicus Euonymus fortunei, Euonymus sieboldianus, Euonymus kiautschovica and Celastrus punctatus.

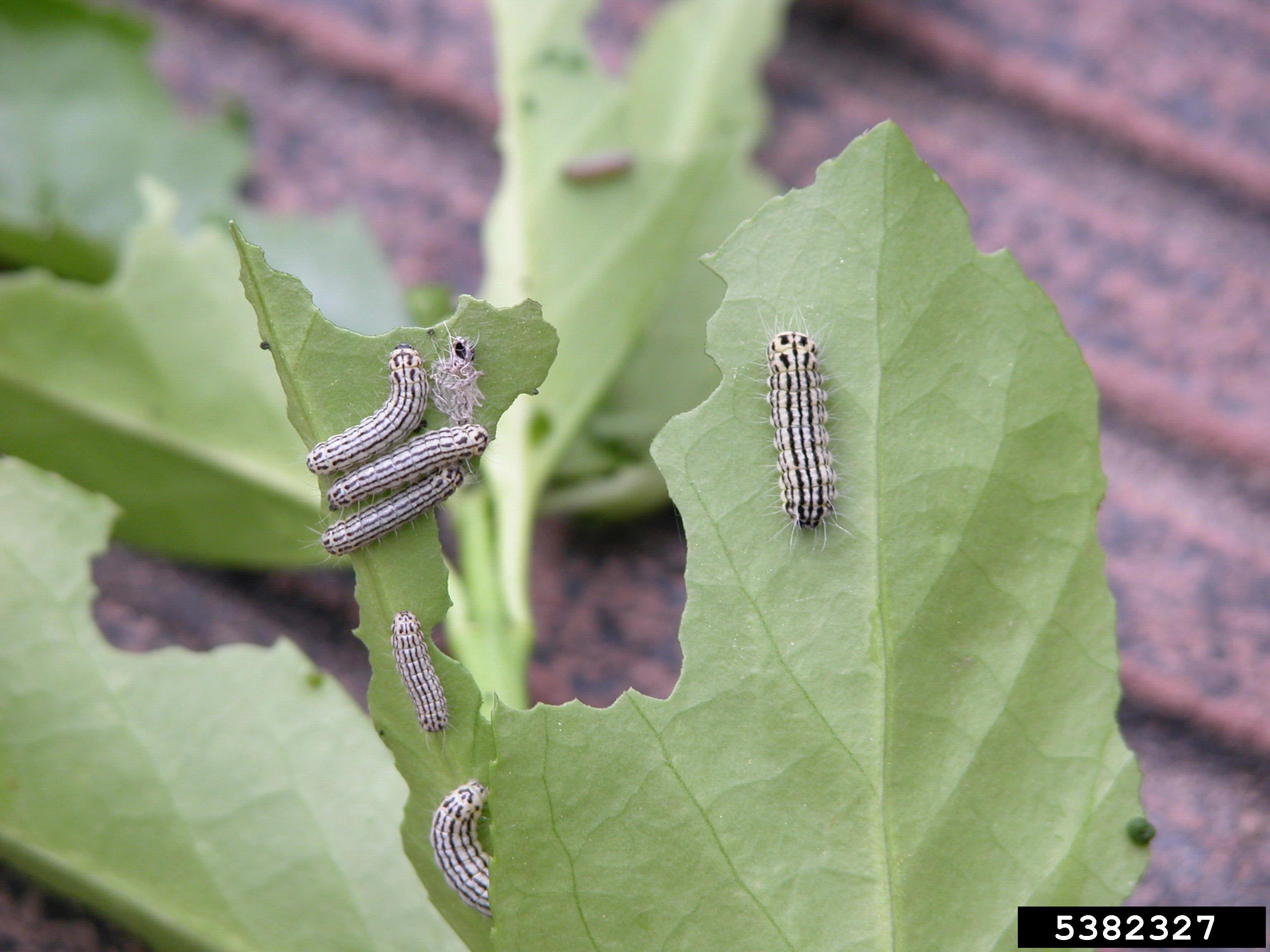
Caterpillars

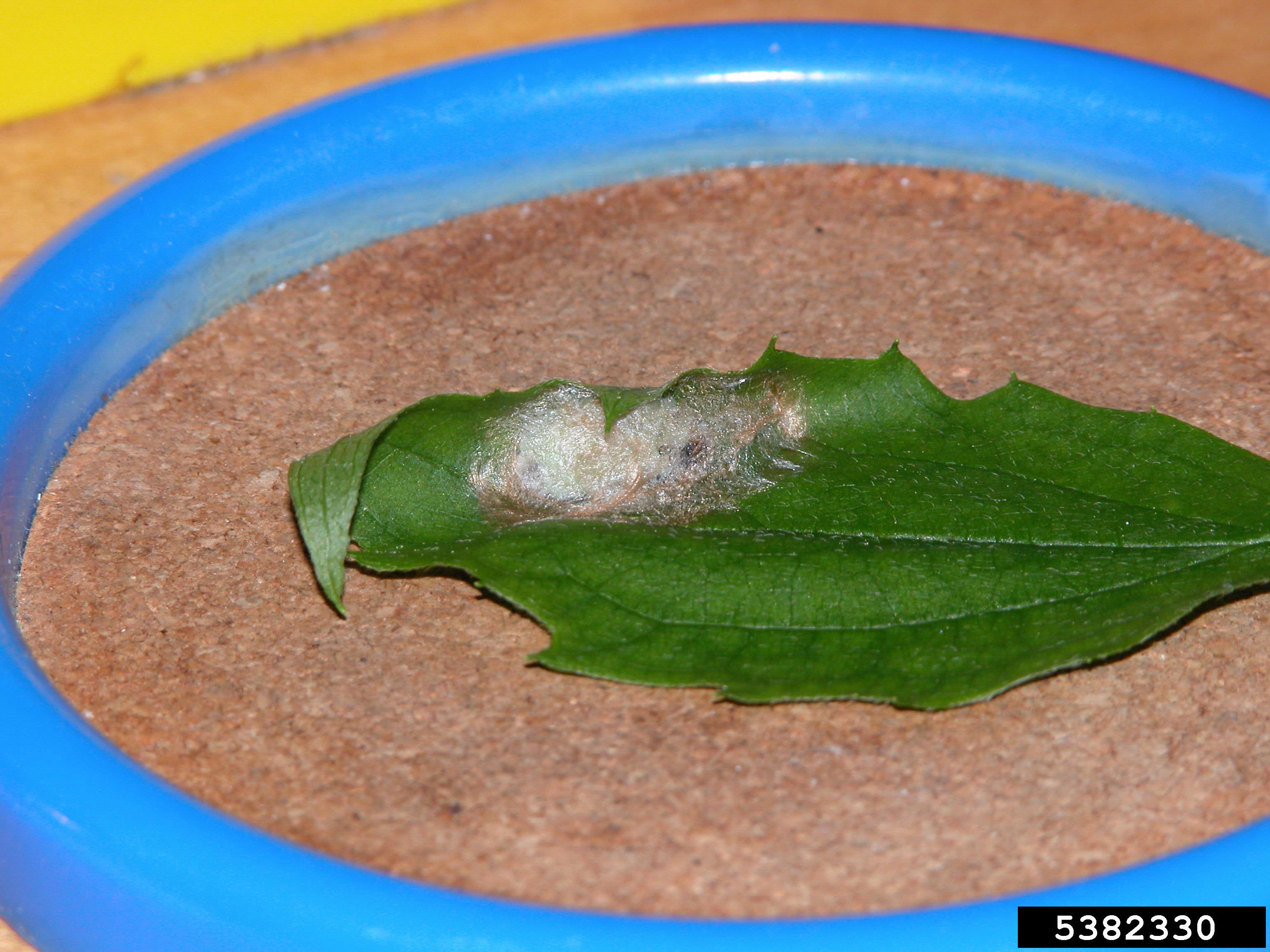
Pupa
