= Podjasnogórska parks =

Urban parks in Częstochowa, Poland

Podjasnogórska parks Stanisław Staszic Park and 3 May Park
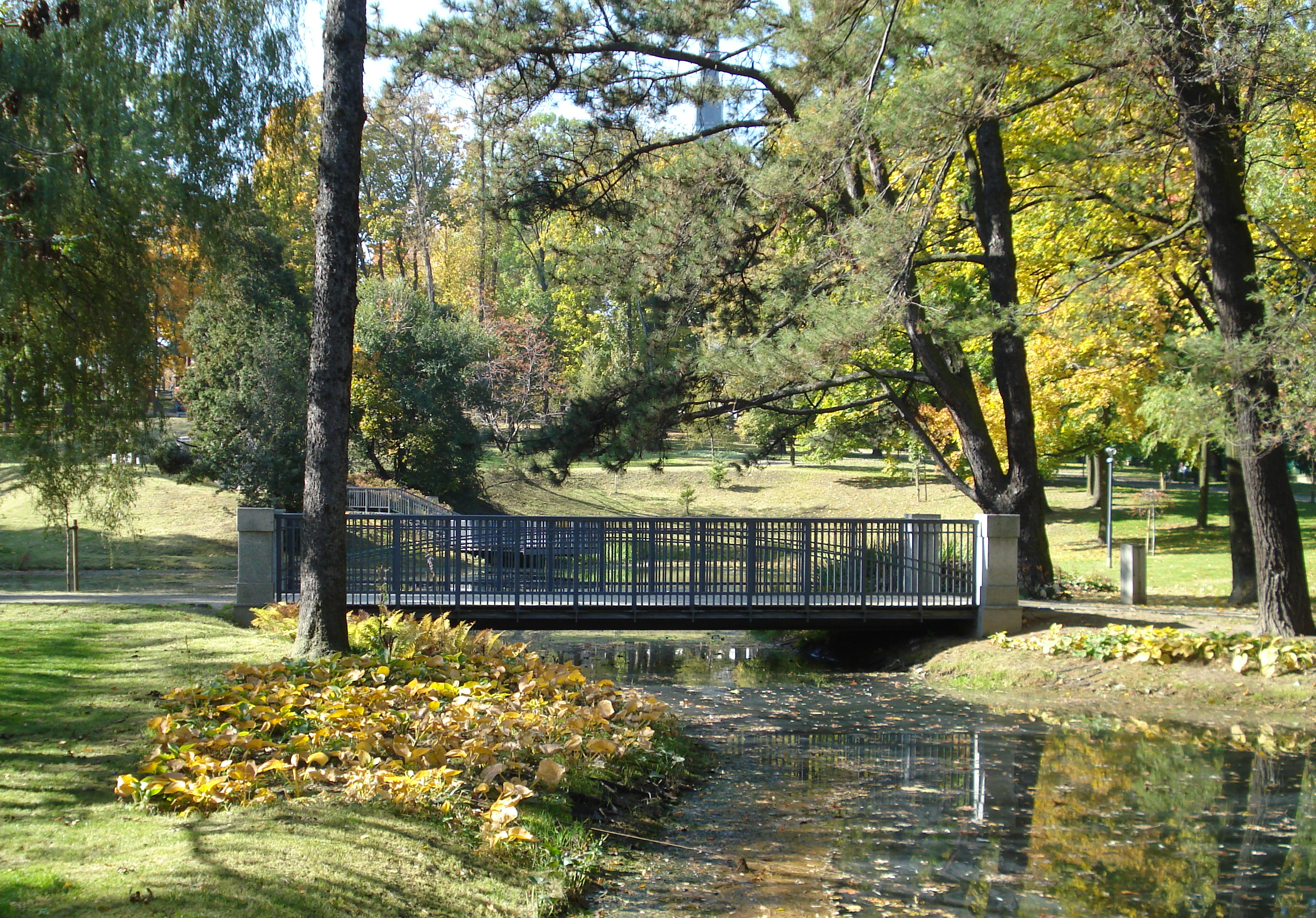
- Footbridge in Stanisław Staszic Park
- Location: Częstochowa (Podjasnogórska district)
- Coordinates: 50°48′45″N 19°06′10″E
- Area: 11.8 ha (29 acres)
- Designer: Franciszek Szanior

Podjasnogórska parks, sometimes called Jasnogórska parks, are two urban parks in Częstochowa, located in the Podjasnogórska district: Stanisław Staszic Park and 3 May Park. They lie between the Śródmieście district and the Jasna Góra Monastery, surrounding it from the east.

The parks' boundaries were established between 1819 and 1826 during the planning of Najświętszej Maryi Panny Avenue, with development beginning in 1843. Together with Henryk Sienkiewicz Avenue, they span 11.8 hectares. Their rich, historically significant furnishings and structures led to their designation as a historic monument in Poland.

The parks contain exhibition pavilions managed by the Częstochowa Museum.

== Appearance ==
The parks are situated near the Jasna Góra fortress and are listed, along with it, in the register of historic monuments under numbers 83 (14 November 1947), 1198/72 (20 December 1972), and 12/78 (17 February 1978).

=== Location ===
Podjasnogórska parks are located on the eastern slope of Jasna Góra Hill, at elevations between 260 and 280 metres above sea level. Stanisław Staszic Park covers 5.4470 hectares, while 3 May Park spans 6.3870 hectares. Their boundaries are:

- 3 Maja Street – northern,
- Father Jerzy Popiełuszko Street and Kazimierz Pułaski Street – eastern,
- 7 Kamienic Street – southern,
- Bishop Bareła Passage – western.

Both parks share a similar layout, featuring a main diagonal pedestrian path with branching paths leading to facilities and recreational areas.

List of tree species in Podjasnogórska parks (as of 2008)
English name	Latin name
Silver birch	Betula pendula
Sawara cypress	Chamaecyparis pisifera
Port Orford cedar	Chamaecyparis lawsoniana
Black cherry	Prunus serotina
Douglas fir	Pseudotsuga taxifolia
Northern red oak	Quercus rubra
Pedunculate oak	Quercus robur
Midland hawthorn	Crataegus laevigata
Common hawthorn	Crataegus monogyna
Common hornbeam	Carpinus betulus
Common pear	Pyrus communis
Apple tree	Malus sp.
Swedish whitebeam	Sorbus intermedia
Common whitebeam	Sorbus aria
Green ash	Fraxinus pennsylvanica
European ash	Fraxinus excelsior
Horse chestnut	Aesculus hippocastanum
Sycamore maple	Acer pseudoplatanus
Box elder	Acer negundo
Silver maple	Acer saccharinum
Norway maple	Acer platanoides
Small-leaved lime	Tilia cordata
Large-leaved lime	Tilia platyphyllos
Mokryeon	Magnolia kobus
European larch	Larix decidua
Oriental plane	Platanus orientalis
Black locust	Robinia pseudoacacia
Austrian pine	Pinus nigra
Scotch pine	Pinus sylvestris
Southern catalpa	Catalpa bignonioides
Norway spruce	Picea abies
Blue spruce	Picea pungens
Silver poplar	Populus alba
Canadian poplar	Populus canadensis
European white elm	Ulmus laevis
Eastern crack-willow	Salix fragilis
Goat willow	Salix caprea
Japanese cherry	Prunus serrulata
Northern white-cedar	Thuja occidentalis

Most common shrub and subshrub species in Podjasnogórska parks (as of 2008)
English name	Latin name
Lesser periwinkle	Vinca minor
Common barberry	Berberis vulgaris
Elder	Sambucus nigra
Common ivy	Hedera helix
Common yew	Taxus baccata
Red-barked dogwood	Cornus alba
Common dogwood	Cornus sanguinea
Cornel	Cornus mas
Red-osier dogwood	Cornus sericea
Bigleaf hydrangea	Hydrangea macrophylla
Bearberry cotoneaster	Cotoneaster dammeri
Creeping juniper	Juniperus horizontalis
Savin juniper	Juniperus sabina
Sweet mock orange	Philadelphus coronarius
Common hazel	Corylus avellana
Wild privet	Ligustrum vulgare
Lilac	Syringa vulgaris
Scarlet firethorn	Pyracantha coccinea
Shrubby cinquefoil	Potentilla fruticosa
Garden rhododendron	Rhododendron hybridum
Japanese pachysandra	Pachysandra terminalis
Dwarf mountain pine	Pinus mugo
Common snowberry	Symphoricarpos albus
Spirea	Spiraea sp.
Spindle	Euonymus fortunei
Fly honeysuckle	Lonicera xylosteum
Chinese thuja	Thuja orientalis

=== Vegetation cover ===
Almost the entire park area is covered with trees and shrubs, with few flower beds arranged near monuments. The current tree population differs from the original due to multiple redesigns. Today's layout reflects a design by gardener Franciszek Szanior from the early 20th century, implemented during the 2000–2008 revitalisation.

Stanisław Staszic Park contains about 1,300 trees, typically between 100 and 150 years old, mostly deciduous. Native species like Norway maple predominate, alongside non-native ones such as green ash, blue spruce, Siberian spruce, northern red oak, cypress, and Chinese juniper.

3 May Park has around 1,600 trees, often over 130 years old, including northern red oaks, ashes, larches, horse chestnuts, and blue spruces.

Nine notable trees, aged 80–160 years with trunks exceeding 300 cm in circumference, are designated as natural monuments. For common pear and tulip tree, trees with circumferences over 220 cm are protected.

== History ==
Until the mid-18th century, the area was a typical Kraków-Częstochowa Upland limestone hill with meadows and pastures used by the monastery and Częstochówka residents. The first attempt to develop the area around Jasna Góra was a project by engineer Jan Bernhard between 1819 and 1826 to create Najświętszej Maryi Panny Avenue, planning a Jasnogórska Market as a third square alongside Ignacy Daszyński Square and Władysław Biegański Square, linking Częstochówka and Old Częstochowa.

This project was abandoned due to the proximity of Wieluński Market, local opposition citing the hilly terrain, and political shifts after the November Uprising.

On 1 January 1843, city authorities decided to create a garden within the boundaries set by the avenue's design. Work began in 1844, importing vast amounts of soil to cover the rocky base and level the slopes across over 11 hectares. About 1,400 trees were planted, the garden was fenced, and walkways were laid out, with completion in 1847. Until World War II, it was maintained by one or two city gardeners.

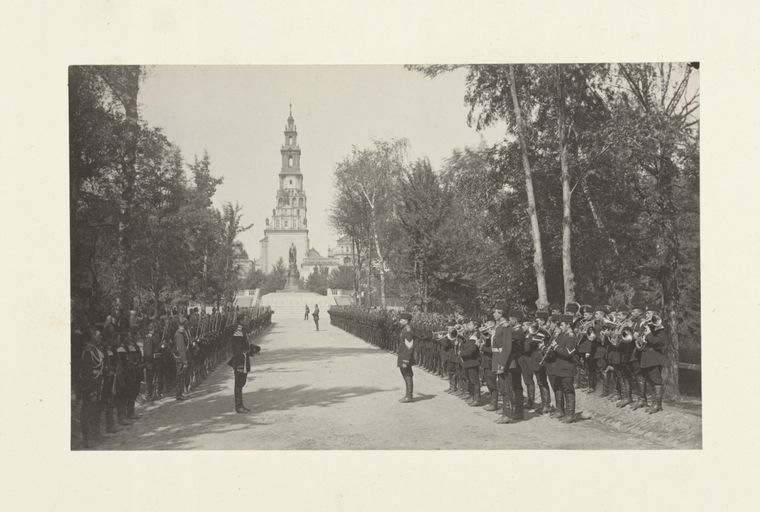
The parks and dividing avenue in 1890

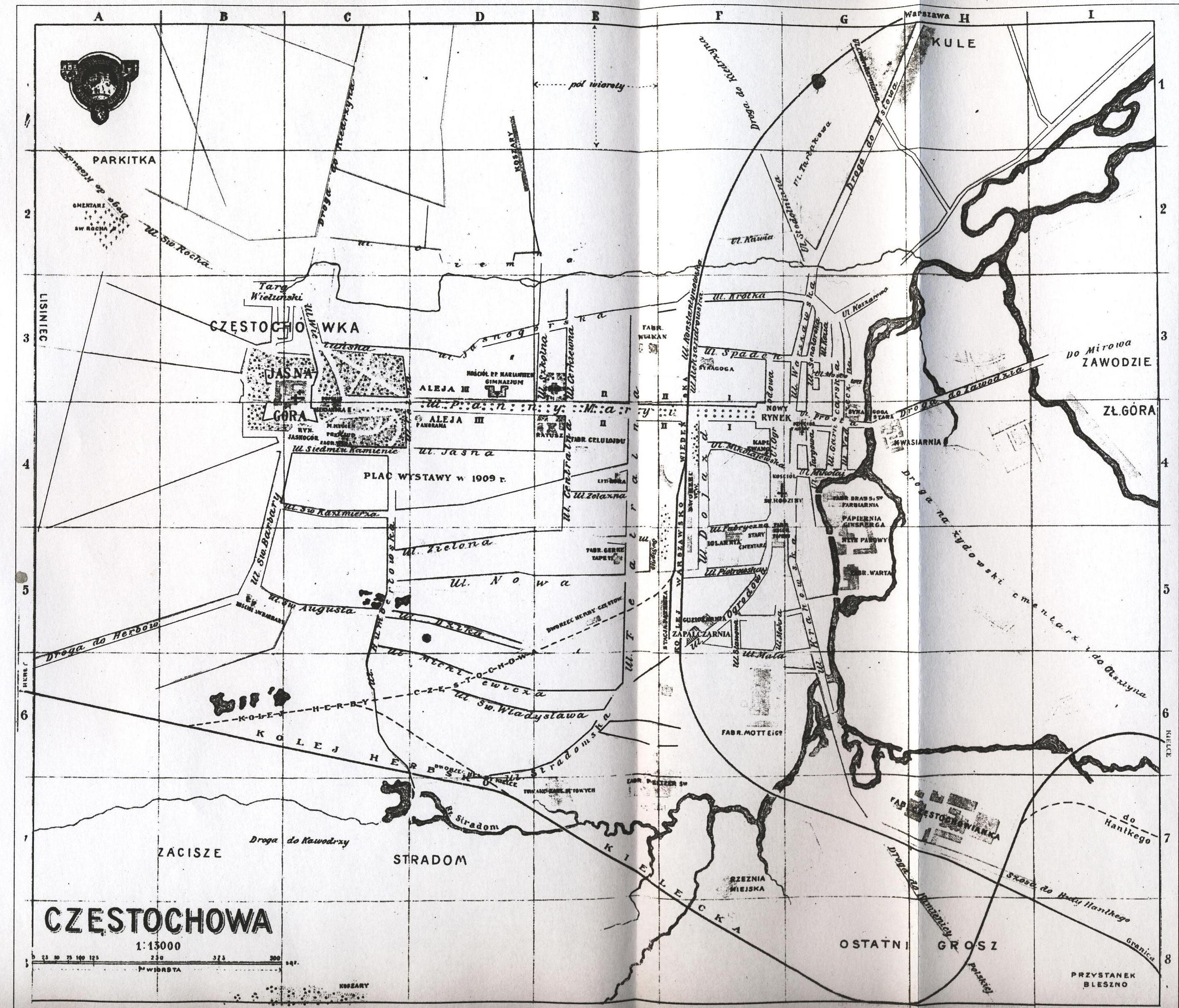
Częstochowa plan from 1913, showing the parks surrounding the monastery and walkway layout

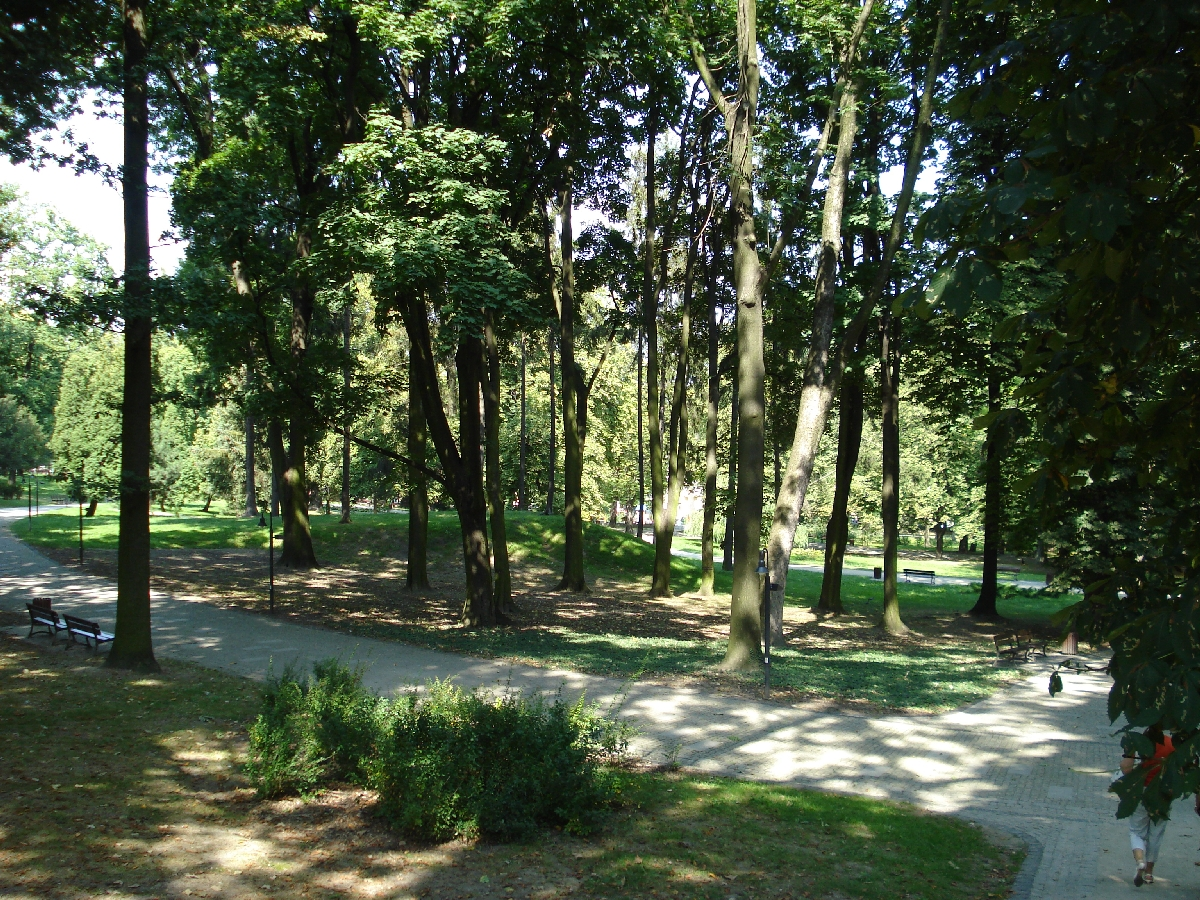
Hilly terrain in 3 May Park

In 1908, before the Industry and Agriculture Exhibition, Warsaw gardener Franciszek Szanior redesigned the neglected parks, removing most old trees and plants but preserving some notable specimens. Exhibition pavilions were built by prominent Polish modernist architects, including Stanisław Witkiewicz, Władysław Jabłoński, Edward Landau, Józef Kon, and Czesław Przybylski. Pathways were reshaped into ellipses and arcs, reflecting contemporary trends.

After 1918, some pavilions (e.g., Korwinów clay products factory, Aurora gas lighting office, culture and education, agriculture, and a water tower) were demolished. The southern park was named after Stanisław Staszic, and the northern after 3 May. On 15 May 1928, priest Bonawentura Metler established an astronomical observatory in one pavilion.

During the German occupation from September 1939 to the Red Army's capture on 17 January 1945, the parks were restricted to Poles. German administrators replaced a pond with a brick-edged flower bed.

In the Polish People's Republic, no modernisation occurred, and the parks deteriorated, becoming a poor reflection of Częstochowa. Stone and gravel paths were paved with asphalt, and some walkways were removed. Between 1974 and 1976, underground corridors mimicking old iron ore mine workings were built between the Ethnographic and Hygienic Museums.

Following protests and tourist feedback, the parks joined the city's revitalisation programme. Between 1992 and 1994, engineer Andrzej Chmiel drafted a revaluation plan to restore their historical layout, clear random plantings, and open up interiors, though only partial tree removal occurred.

On 8 September 1994, President Lech Wałęsa declared the parks and Jasna Góra a historic monument, effective 16 September 1994.

From 1996, only minor repairs were made due to limited funds. The parks had about 5,000 trees, mostly self-seeded and diseased, hindering original plantings. On 4 April 2006, funding from the European Regional Development Fund was secured via the Integrated Regional Operational Programme. A tender for revitalisation was announced on 1 June 2006, and work began after the site was handed over on 10 November 2006, costing 14,326,000 PLN.

Asphalt paths were replaced with granite pavers, wood, and gravel, echoing materials used before the 1909 exhibition. Paths were reshaped to post-1909 designs. Two playgrounds (one for children under three), a small market square, chess tables, and water fountains were added. About 2,500 trees were removed, and plantings were adjusted to restore early 20th-century species composition.

The parks reopened on 19 February 2008, and the Iron Ore Mining Museum reopened on 15 May 2008 after renovations starting 20 July 2005. The revitalisation earned the 2008 Lider Małopolski award for the best project in Lesser Poland. The final phase, renovating the observatory pavilion, concluded on 5 June 2010.

== Great Exhibition pavilions ==
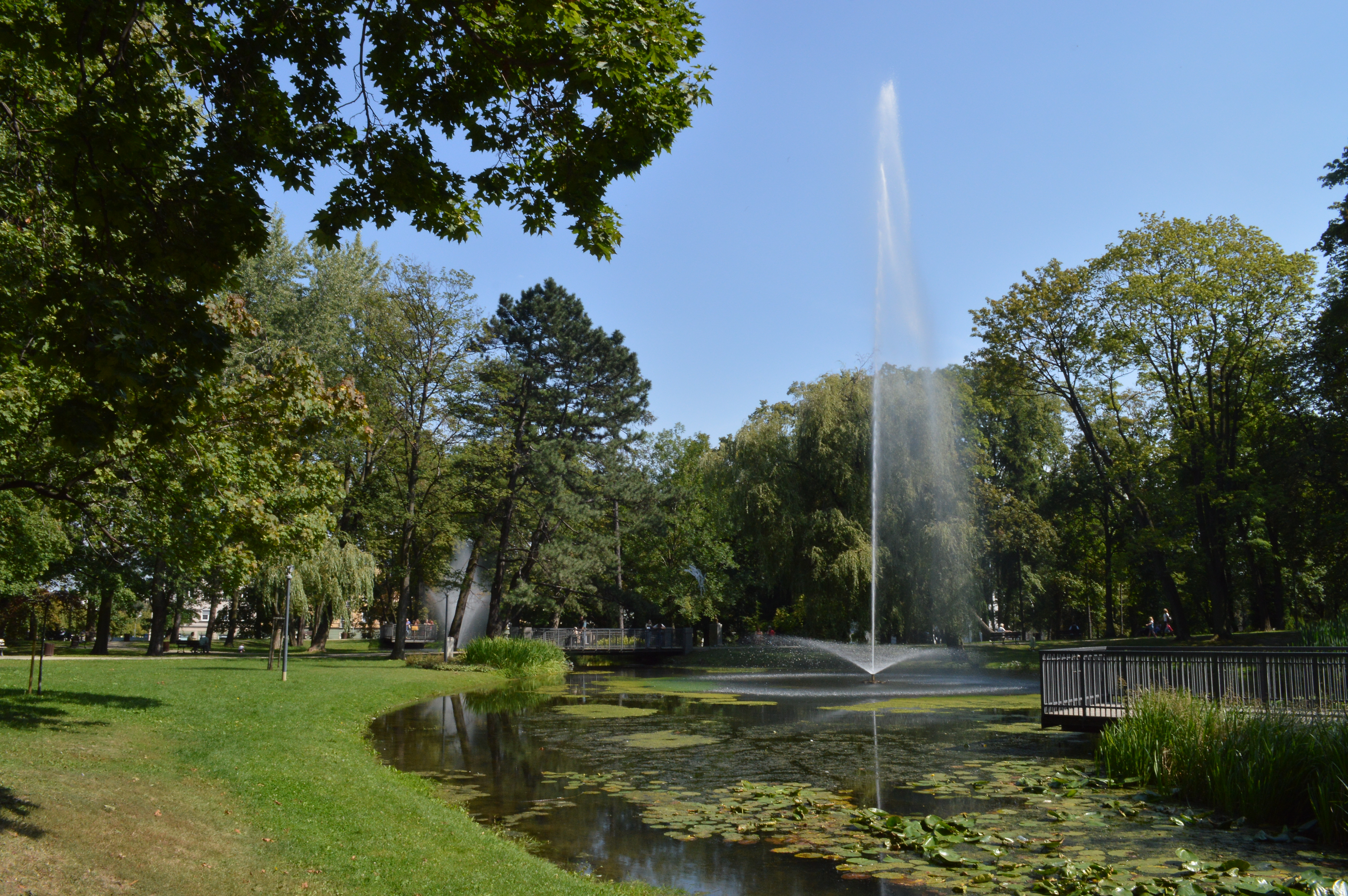
Pond and fountains in Stanisław Staszic Park

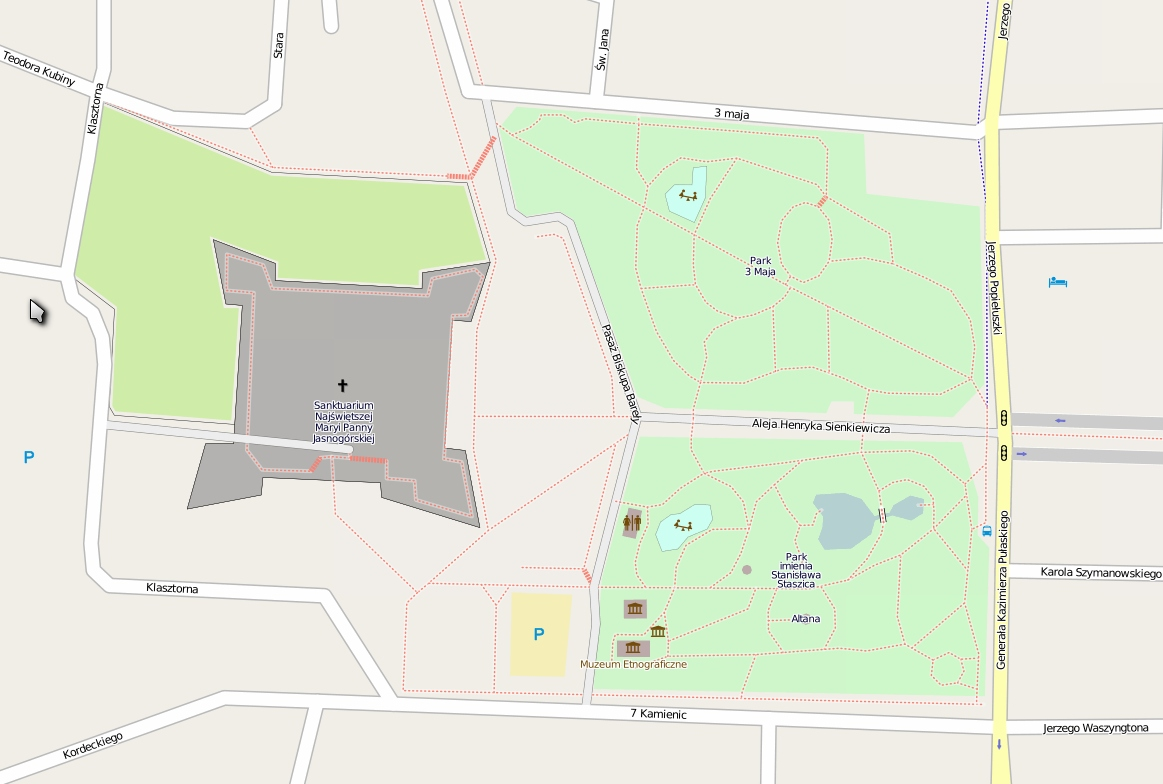
Plan of paths and facilities in Podjasnogórska parks

Stanisław Staszic Park contains several structures built between 1908 and 1909 for the Industry and Agriculture Exhibition of 1909. Originally exhibition pavilions, they have served as display spaces, undergoing renovations from 1996 to 2010 due to neglect during the Polish People's Republic era.

=== Astronomical observatory ===
Built in 1909 for the Zawiercie Joint-Stock Company, designed by Władysław Jabłoński, this steel-concrete structure became an observatory in 1929 through priest Bonawentura Metler's efforts, featuring a telescope he built at the Sorbonne. After World War II, it was used by Częstochowa's Jan Długosz University, but tree growth and street lighting hindered observations, leading to its decline. Renovated between 2008 and 2009, it reopened as the Zodiak multimedia centre for youth education on 5 June 2010.

=== Ethnographic pavilion ===
This ground-floor, rectangular limestone pavilion, designed by Konstanty Jakimowicz, has hosted ethnographic exhibits since its creation. Known as the Folk Industry Museum, it housed a school post-exhibition. Renovated from 20 July 2005 to 19 October 2007, its stone facade was uncovered, restoring its original functions.

=== Peasant homestead ===
A pavilion designed by Zdzisław Kalinowski and Czesław Przybylski. This single-storey building, partially with a basement and a usable attic, was constructed using ceramic brick. It is covered with a gable roof of wooden construction, clad with ceramic tiles. During the exhibition in 1909, it showcased the architectural style trends in house construction at the beginning of the 20th century. It was arranged as a model pen.

From 2003 to 2006, the building underwent a complete renovation. Architectural elements and details were restored in accordance with the guidelines of the heritage conservator. Urban and spatial features were preserved: the building's form with the shape of the roof and entrance porch, the layout of arched brick vaults over the basement rooms, and the historical floor plan of the building remained unchanged. The current exhibition also refers to themes from the time of the Great Exhibition.

=== Hygienic Museum ===
The Hygienic Museum, now known as the Temporary Exhibitions Pavilion, is a two-storey building with two halls and a mezzanine. It is an eclectic-style structure, built according to a design by Brunon Paprocki. During the Industry and Agriculture Exhibition, it showcased everyday hygiene products and medicines. From 1932 to 1967, the building housed the Regional Museum. In 1966, the Museum of Iron Ore Mining was opened in the pavilion, which was relocated in 1976 to newly built underground corridors. Today, the pavilion is used for temporary exhibitions organised by the Częstochowa Museum.

=== Other facilities ===
The park includes a gazebo for summer music performances, a 1,600 m² water reservoir with summer fountains, and a restroom adapted in 2006 for pilgrims, including accessibility features.

=== Gallery ===
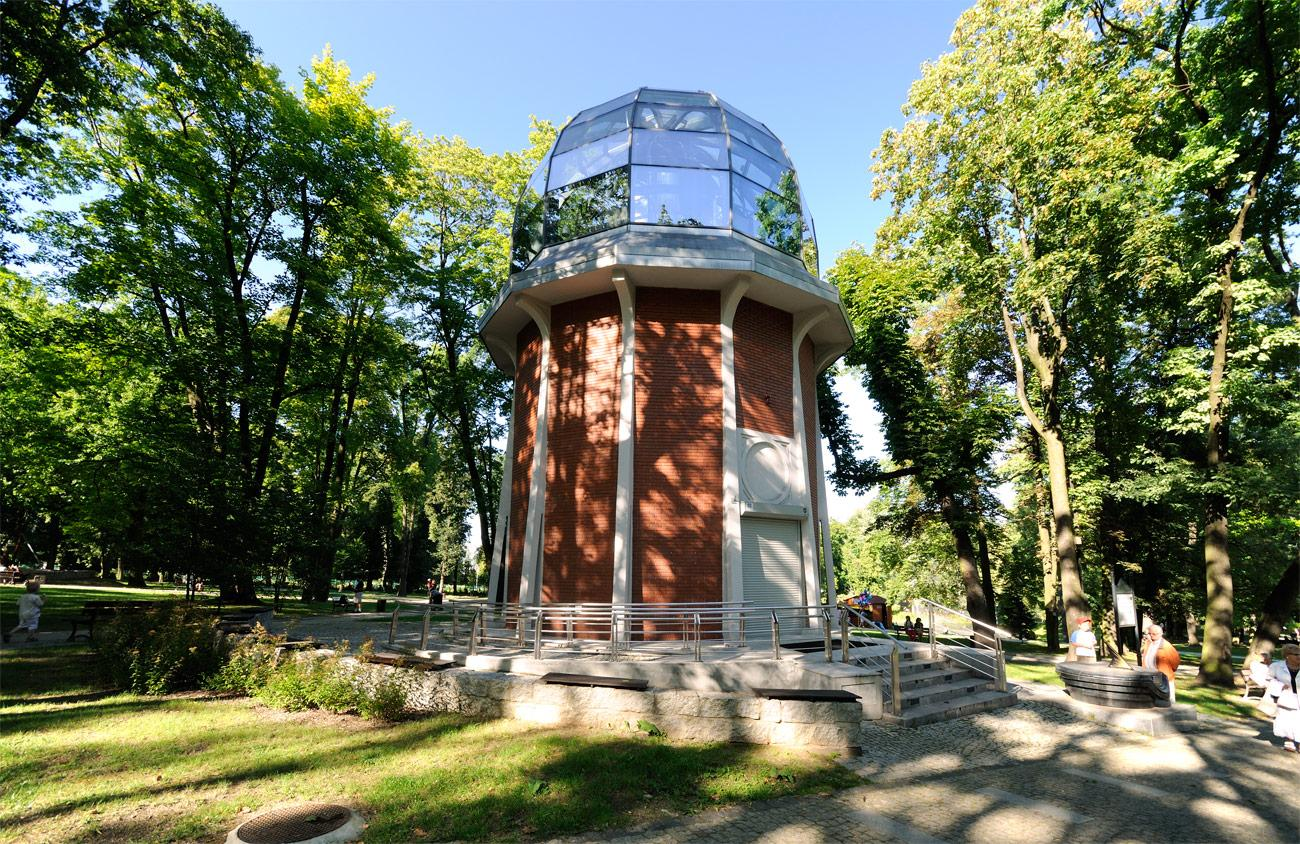
Former observatory building

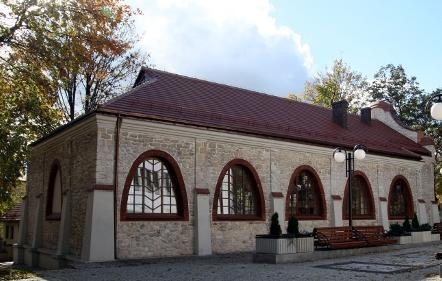
Folk Industry Museum

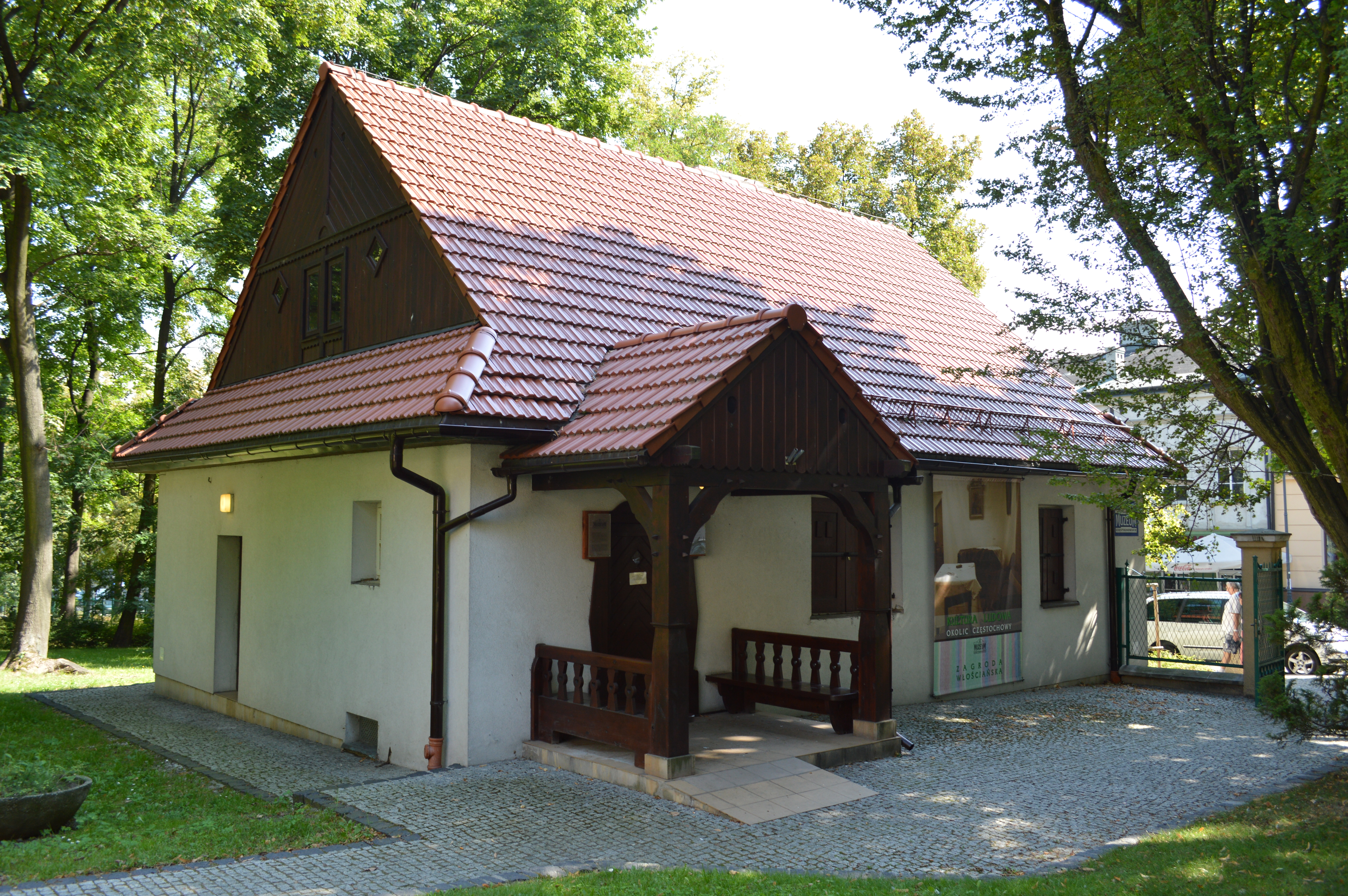
Peasant homestead

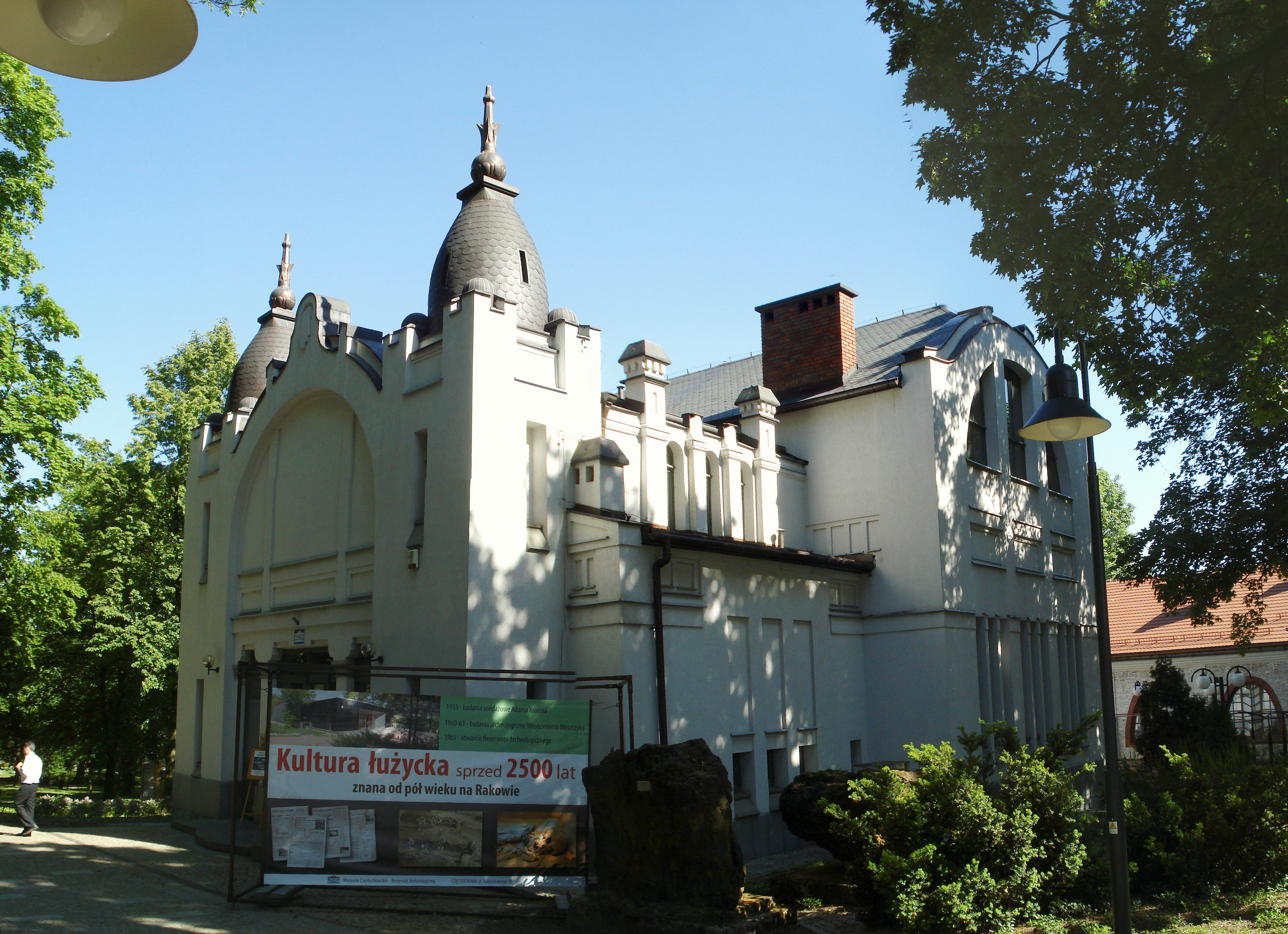
Temporary exhibition pavilion

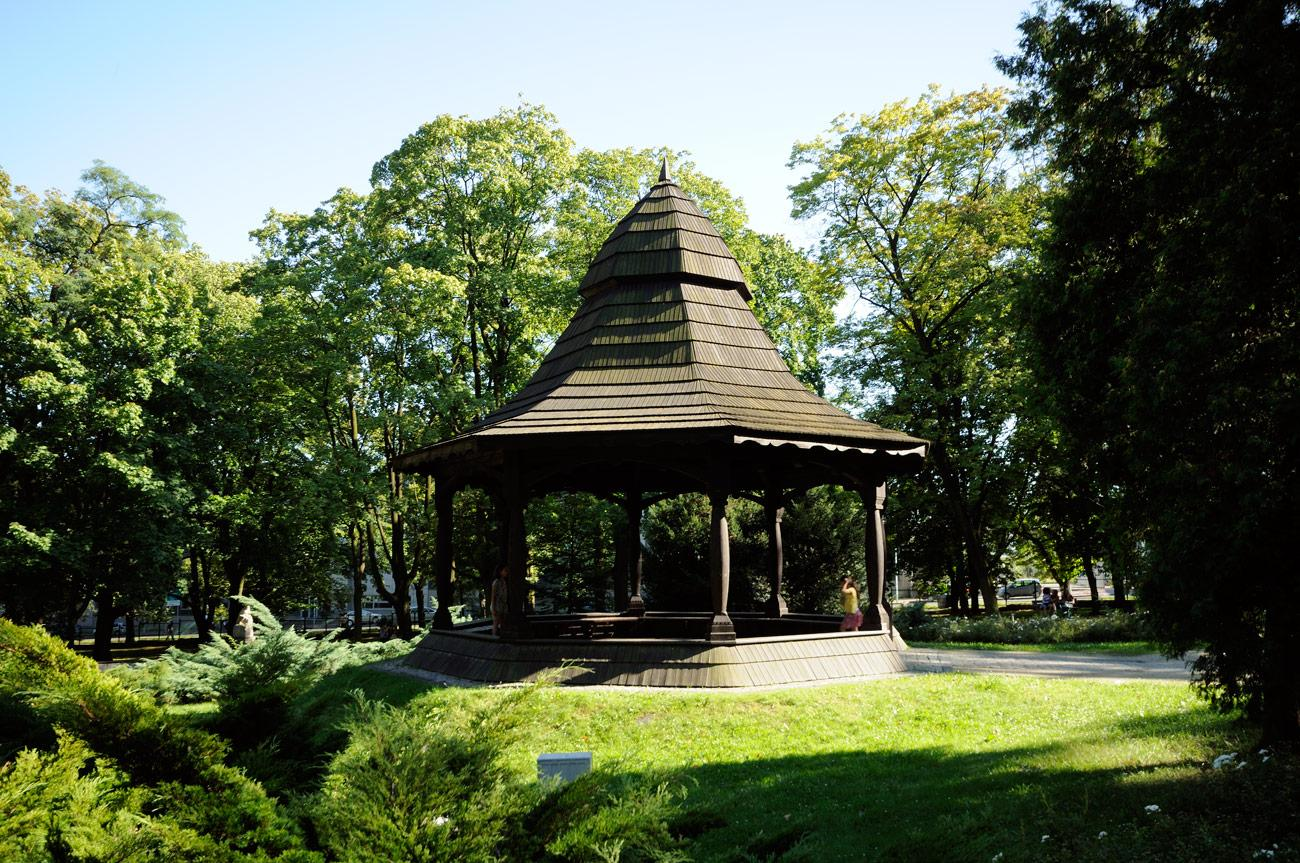
Gazebo

== Iron Ore Mining Museum ==
Located in Staszic Park's underground between the Ethnographic and Hygienic Pavilions, this museum, part of the Częstochowa Museum and the Silesian Industrial Monuments Route, recreates old iron ore mine workings with equipment from the closed Szczekaczka mine.

=== Gallery ===
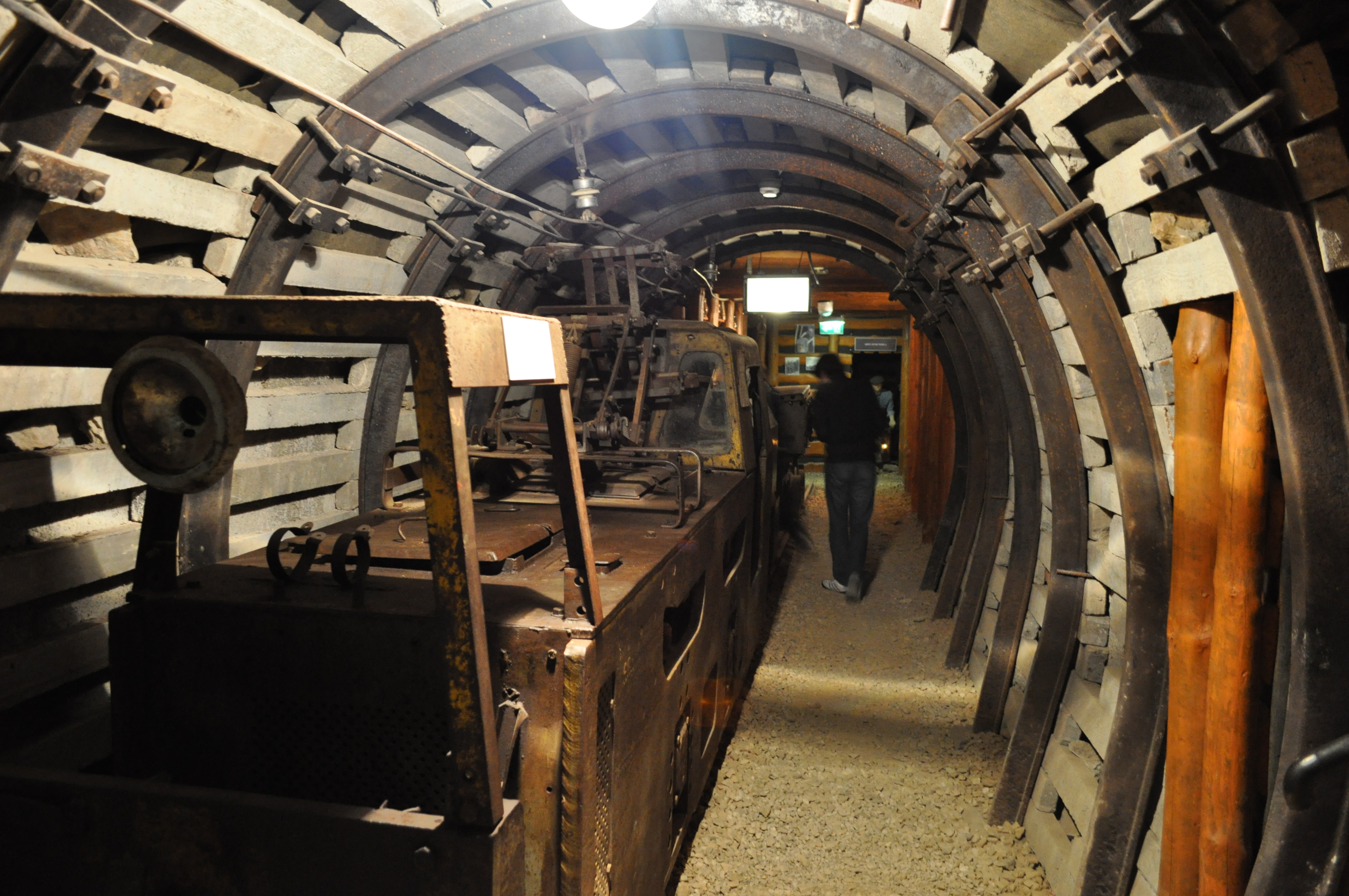
Museum corridor

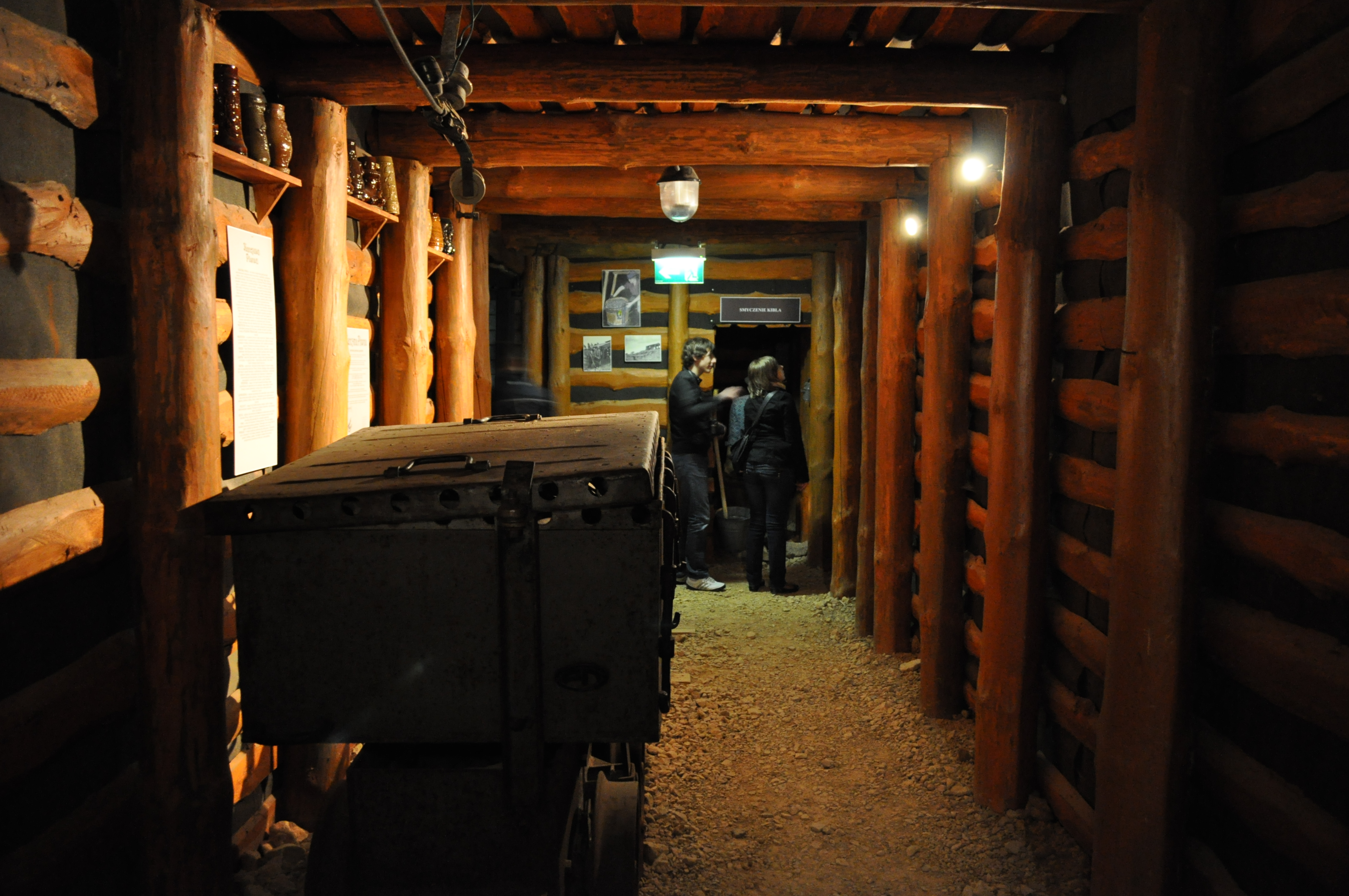
Museum corridor

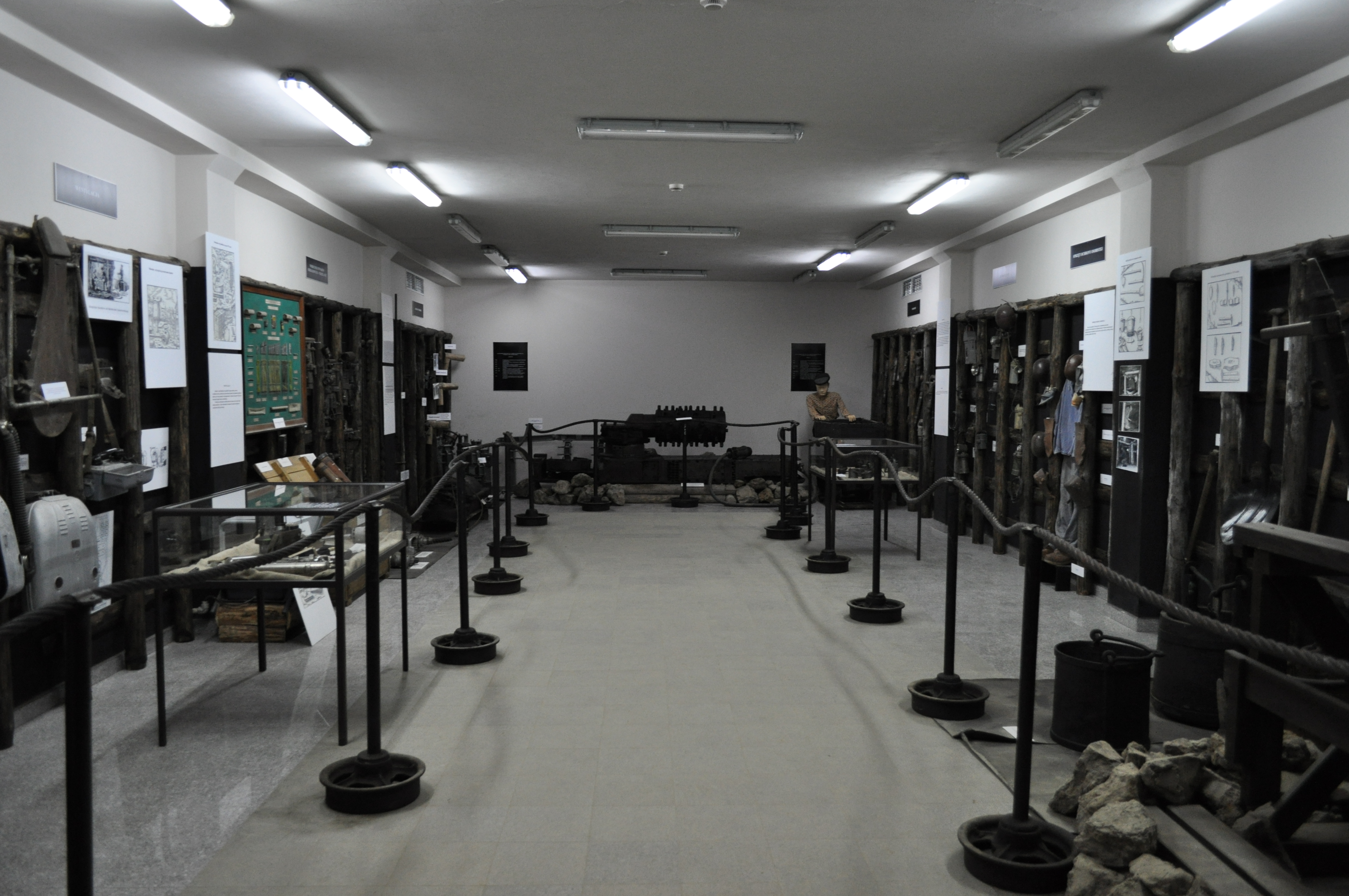
Tool exhibit

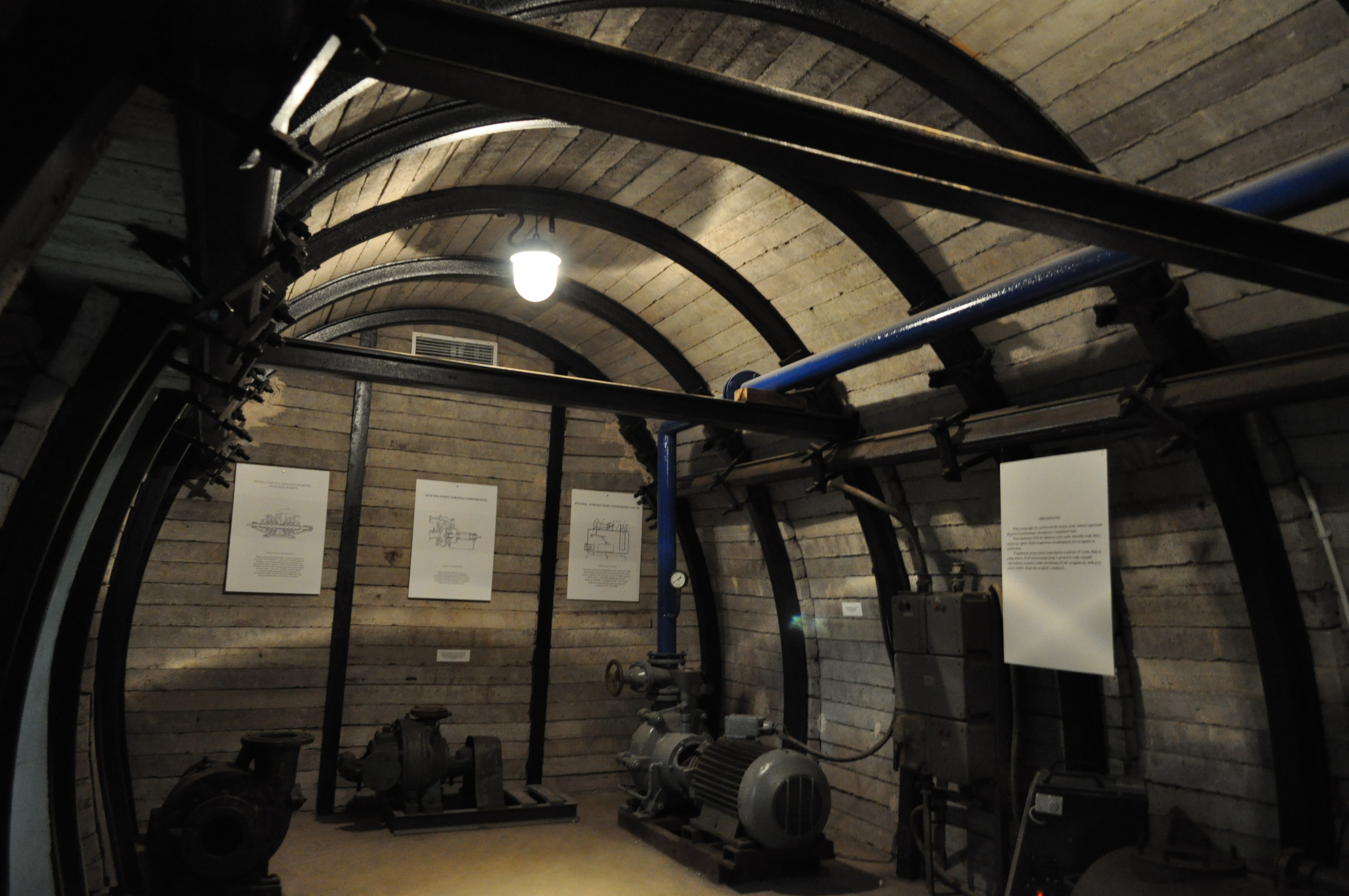
Mining machinery exhibit

== Monuments and sculptures ==
=== Stanisław Moniuszko monument ===
In 3 May Park's central square, this monument to Stanisław Moniuszko, designed by Stefan Policiński, was erected in 1958 by the Pochodnia male choir and unveiled on 22 November 1958. A concrete cast on a wooden frame, it stands on a granite plinth from a destroyed Casimir Pulaski monument. It was restored in August 2008, a challenge due to its fragile materials.

=== Seated girl sculpture ===
This romantic cream sandstone sculpture near the peasant homestead in Staszic Park, created by Władysław Rudlicki in 1911, depicts a reclining young woman. Restored in 2008, it had deteriorated from organic acids and nearby trees.

=== Casimir Pulaski bust ===
The original Casimir Pulaski bust in 3 May Park, unveiled on 11 November 1929, was destroyed by German forces. The current ceramic bust by Jerzy Kędziora, installed in 1994 in Staszic Park, sits on an older sandstone pedestal with a modern granite plaque.

=== Stanisław Staszic bust ===
Erected in 1974 in Staszic Park's eastern section, this brass bust by Paweł Maliński, based on an 1826 design, rests on a granite plinth.

=== Sundial ===
Near the former observatory, this sundial, made from black granite from the Alexander II monument (1889–1917), bears an inscription by Bonawentura Metler:

Original	Interpretation
Quam Virgo Dilexit; Hic Urbem Ad Astra; Apellat Et Gentem; Buona Ventura	How Much the Virgin Loved This City; That She Calls It to the Stars; And Destines It for a Better Future

=== Jerzy Kędziora's balancing sculptures ===
On 10 August 2008, a permanent gallery of Jerzy Kędziora's balancing sculptures opened in Staszic Park, featuring Self-Portrait – Crusting II, Acrobat with Chair, and Little Gymnast. In May 2012, for his 40th creative anniversary, he displayed additional works, but all were removed post-exhibition.

=== Gallery ===
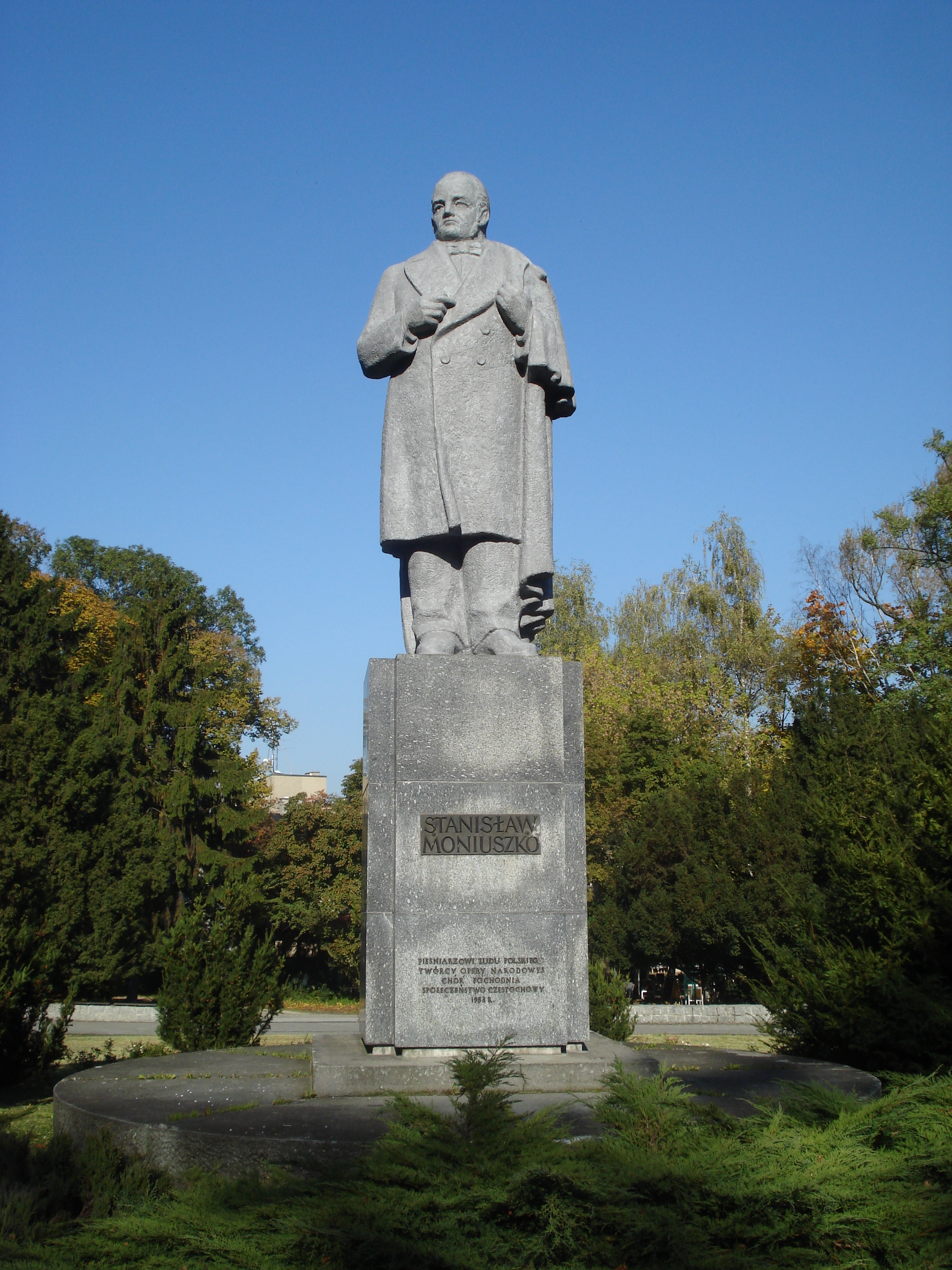
Stanisław Moniuszko monument in 3 May Park

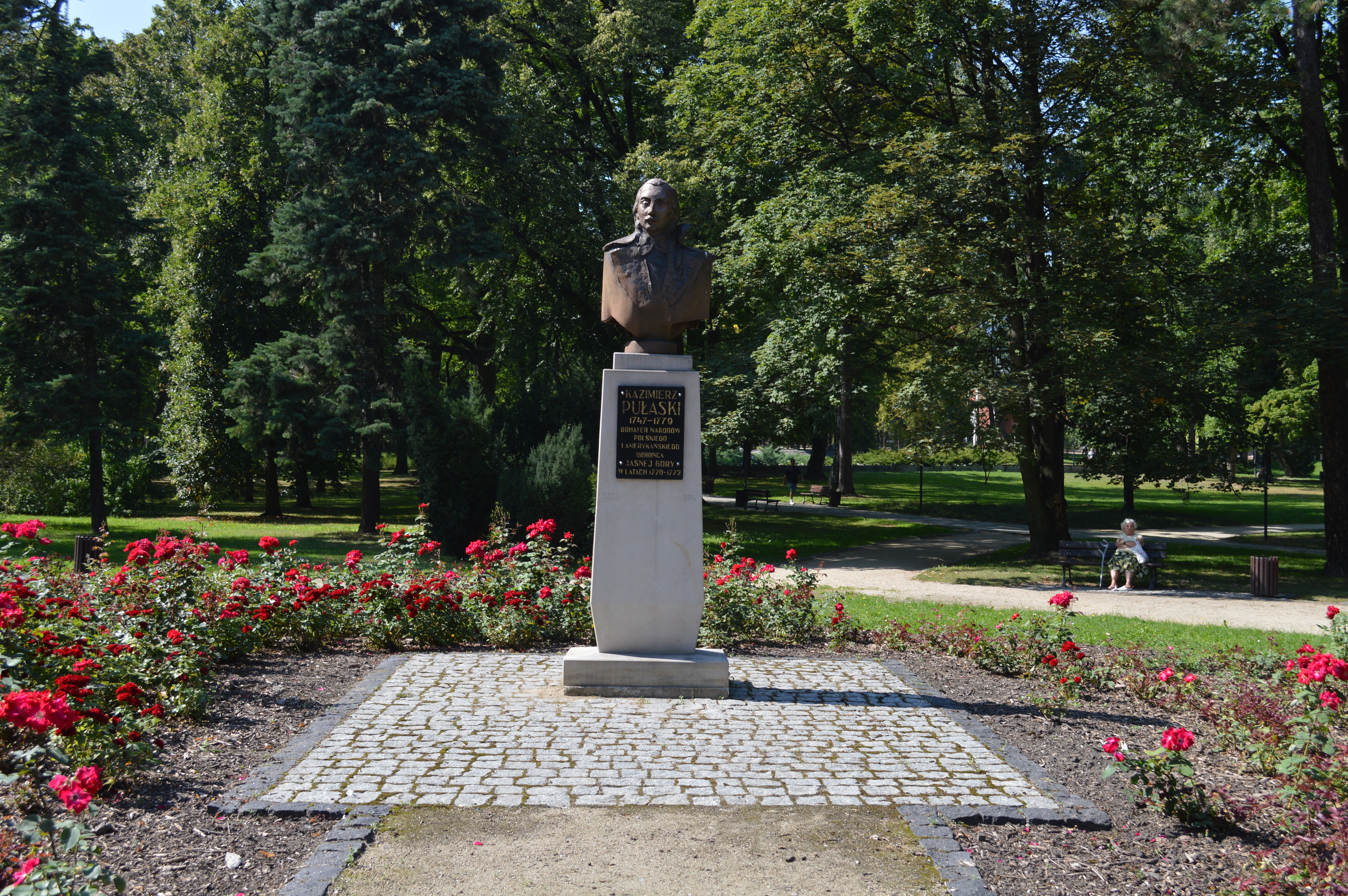
Casimir Pulaski bust

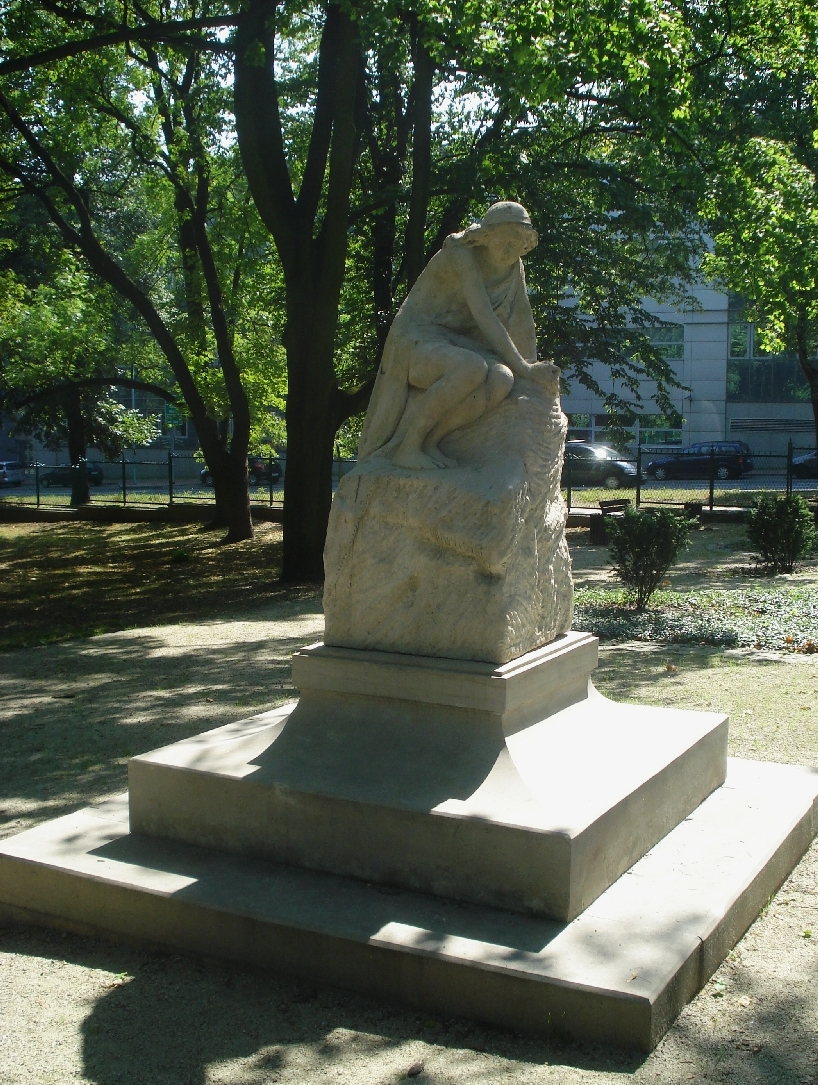
Seated girl sculpture

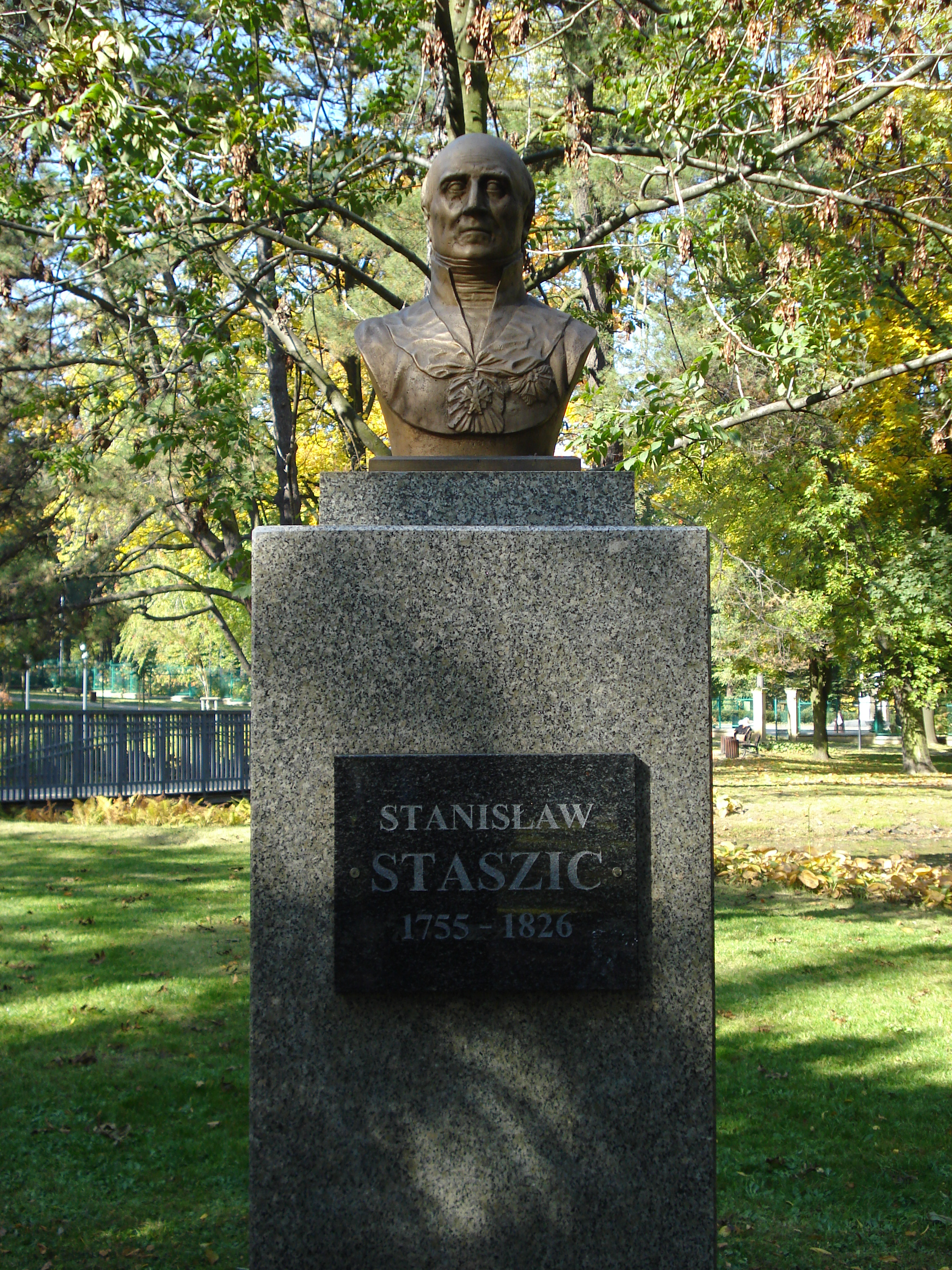
Stanisław Staszic bust

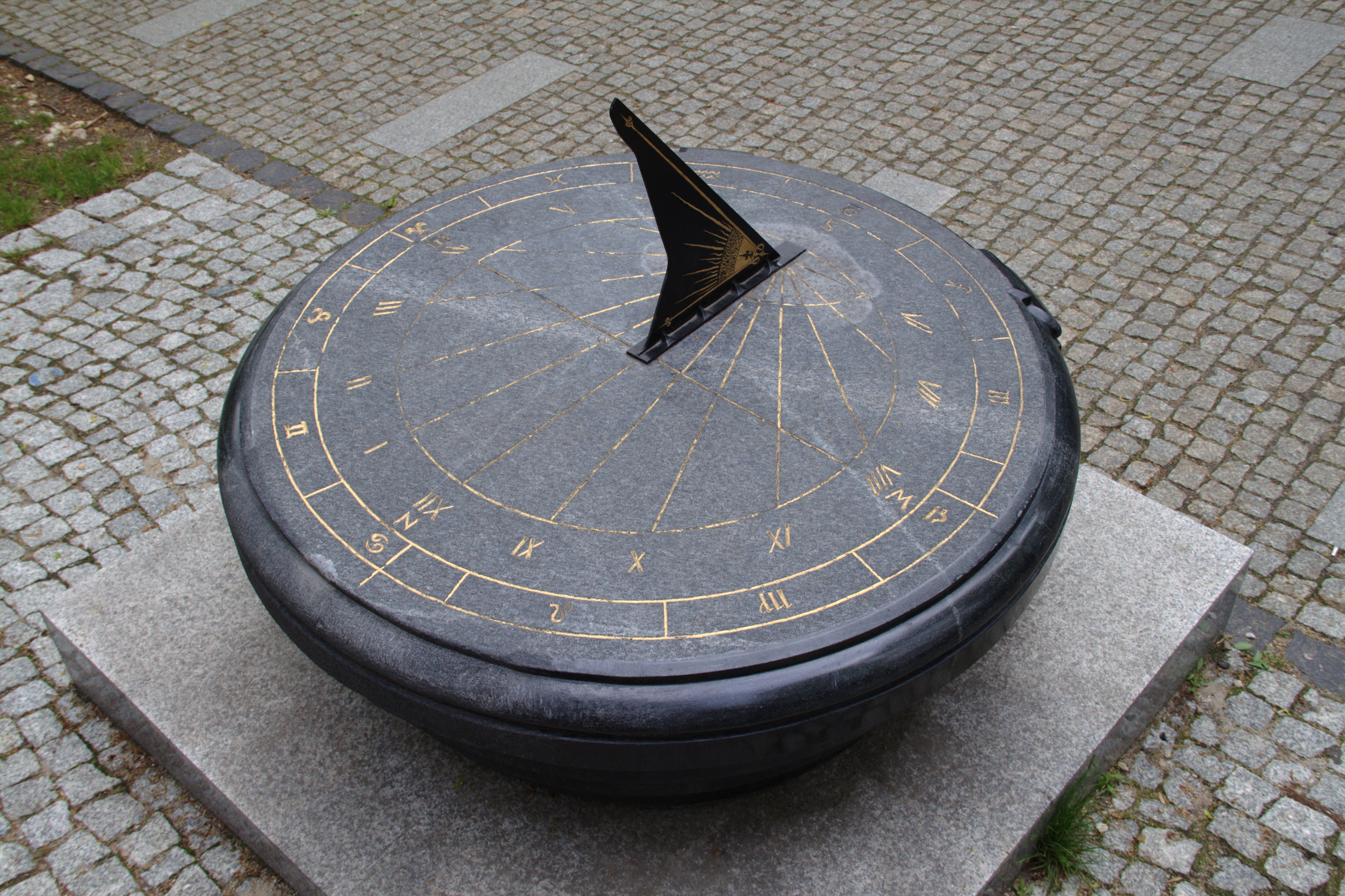
Sundial

== Victoria 1922 tennis club ==
In 3 May Park, near the 3 Maja and Jerzy Popiełuszko streets intersection, the Victoria Częstochowa club features five tennis courts and a clubhouse. Designated in the early 1920s, the courts were built from 1922 to 1926, with the club section opening in 1926. Closed during World War II, it reopened post-war, with damaged courts repaired and small stands added.

== Park regulations ==
Post-revitalisation, Częstochowa City Council set rules closing the parks from 10:00 PM to 7:00 AM. The original version, banning dogs, sitting on grass, cycling, and intoxicated visitors, sparked controversy. In March 2009, the Silesian Voivode challenged it in court for restricting freedoms, and the Gliwice Administrative Court declared it invalid.
