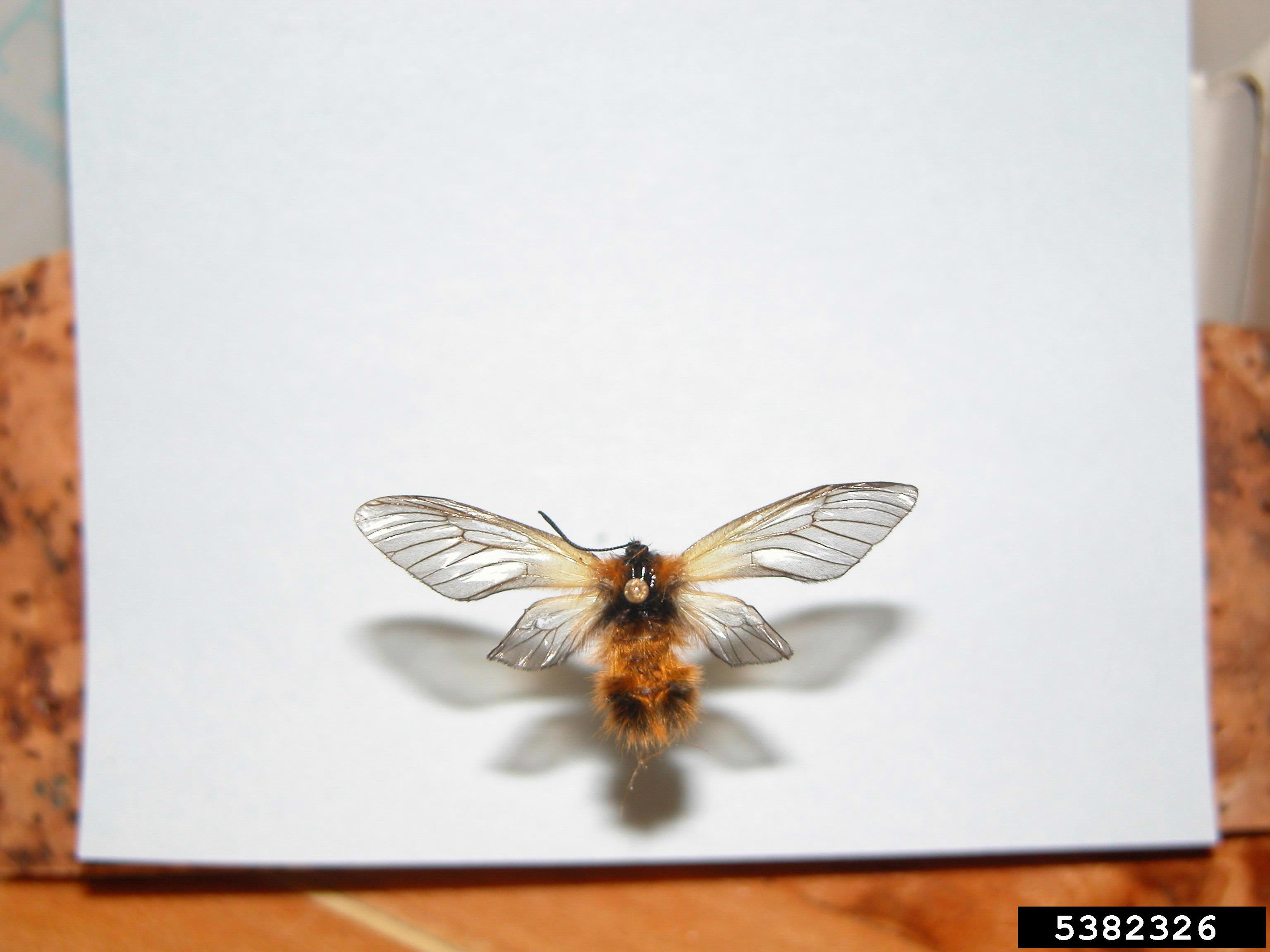
- Pryeria sinica

Scientific classification
- Domain: Eukaryota
- Kingdom: Animalia
- Phylum: Arthropoda
- Class: Insecta
- Order: Lepidoptera
- Family: Zygaenidae
- Genus: Pryeria; Moore, 1877

= Pryeria =

Genus of moths

Pryeria is a genus of moths belonging to the family Zygaenidae.

The species of this genus are found in Southeastern Asia.

== Species ==
Species:

- Pryeria simonyi Rebel, 1899
- Pryeria sinica Moore, 1877
- Pryeria sylviae Rebel, 1959
