= Jasna Góra (hill) =

Hill in Częstochowa, Poland

Jasna Góra Hill
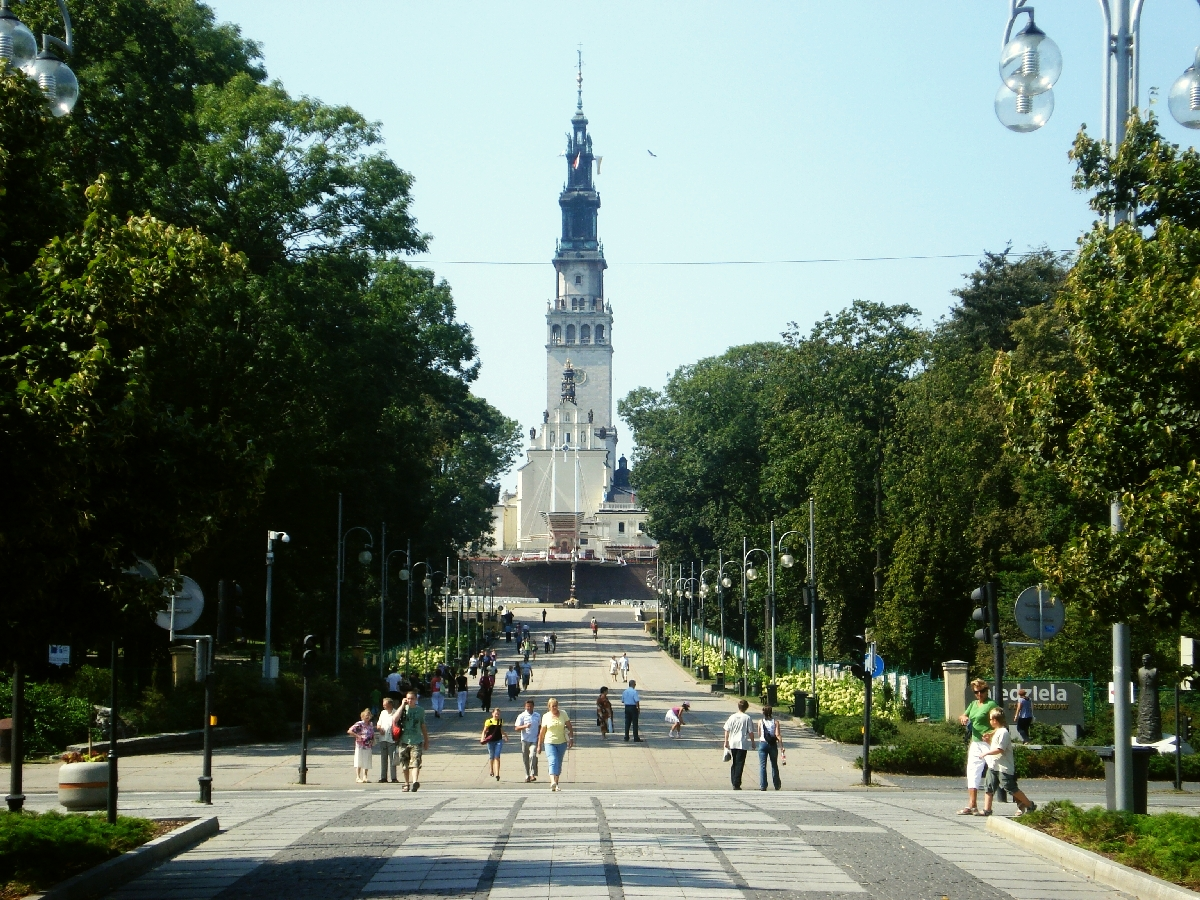
- View of the hill and the Jasna Góra Monastery from Najświętszej Maryi Panny Avenue

Highest point
- Elevation: 295 m (968 ft)
- Coordinates: 50°48′42″N 19°05′28″E

Geography
- Location within Poland
- Location: Częstochowa
- Country: Poland

Jasna Góra Hill (formerly Stara Góra Hill) is a hill in Częstochowa, Poland, with an elevation of 295 meters above sea level, located in the Upper Warta Depression. The northeastern summit of the hill is home to the Jasna Góra Monastery.

The TERYT register lists Jasna Góra as a part of the city of Częstochowa. Administratively, it belongs to the districts of Podjasnogórska and Częstochówka-Parkitka.

== Geography ==
The hill has three summits. The highest point, at 295 meters above sea level, is located approximately 325 meters west of the Jasna Góra Monastery, behind the pilgrim house parking lot. The monastery complex is situated on the northeastern summit, at an elevation of 293 meters above sea level. The third summit, in the southwest, is located near St. Monika Street. For comparison, Częstochowa's city center lies at an elevation of 250–255 meters above sea level.

It is an inselberg composed of Upper Jurassic limestone. The base is surrounded by layers of Middle Jurassic clay. The hill is heavily urbanized, with limestone outcrops preserved in only two locations (near the St. James Bastion and the sixth station of the Way of the Cross).

== Name ==
The name Jasna Góra was first used in a document from 1388. It was given by Hungarian Pauline monks in reference to their mother monastery of St. Lawrence on Jasna Góra in Buda. The hypothesis that the name derives from the hill's light-colored limestone is considered unlikely. Previously, the hill was known as Stara Góra (Old Hill).

An alternative perspective suggests that Stara Góra refers to the entire hill, while Jasna Góra specifically denotes the northeastern summit where the monastery is located.
