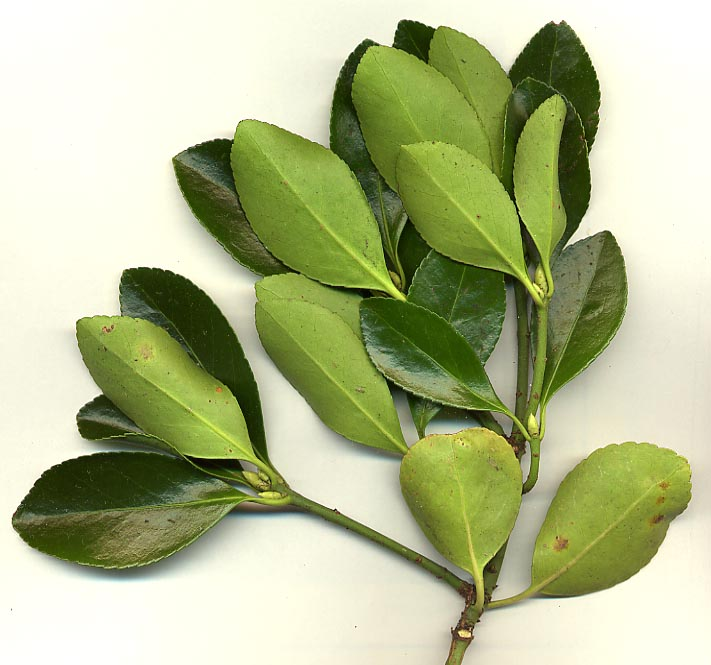

Scientific classification
- Kingdom: Plantae
- Clade: Tracheophytes
- Clade: Angiosperms
- Clade: Eudicots
- Clade: Rosids
- Order: Celastrales
- Family: Celastraceae
- Genus: Euonymus
- Species: E. japonicus

Binomial name
- Euonymus japonicus Thunb.

Synonyms
- Elaeodendron javanicum Turcz.; Euonymus carrierei Dippel; Euonymus pulchellus Jacob-Makoy; Euonymus sinensis Carrière, nom. illeg.; Euonymus variegatus J.Dix; Euonymus yoshinagae Makino; Masakia japonica (Thunb.) Nakai; Masakia yoshinagae (Makino) Nakai; Pragmotessara japonica (Thunb.) Pierre

= Euonymus japonicus =

Species of flowering plant

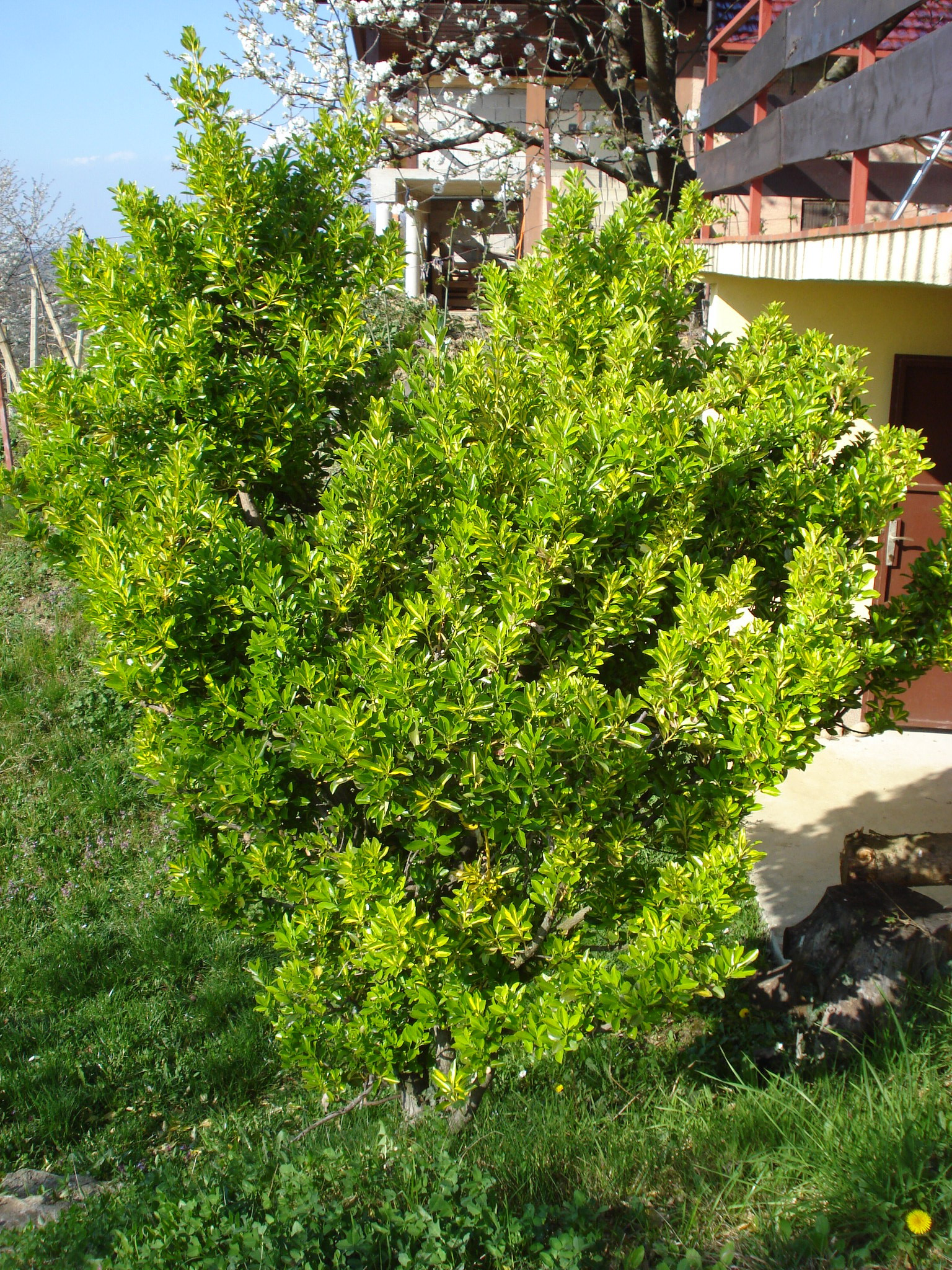
A variegated Cultivar in early springtime

Euonymus japonicus (evergreen spindle or Japanese spindle) is a species of flowering plant in the family Celastraceae, native to Japan and Korea.

== Description ==
Euonymus japonicus is an evergreen shrub or small tree growing to 3 m (10 ft) tall, with opposite, oval leaves 3–12 cm (1.2–4.7 in) long, more usually 6–10 cm (2.4–3.9 in) long, with finely serrated margins towards the end of the leaves. The flowers are inconspicuous, greenish-white, 5–6 mm (0.2 in) across. The fruit capsule is brown, or yellow- to red-brown. The seeds have an orange-red aril.

Euonymus japonicus is very similar to Euonymus fortunei, particularly in cultivation. In the wild, E. japonicus has an erect habit, whereas E. fortunei is climbing or procumbent.

== Taxonomy ==
Euonymus japonicus was first described by Carl Peter Thunberg in 1780. A large number of varieties and forms have been named, none of which were accepted by Plants of the World Online as of November 2024.

== Horticultural cultivars ==
Euonymus japonicus is a popular ornamental plant for parks and gardens, both in its native area and also in Europe and North America. In particular the numerous cultivars which have been selected (often with variegated or yellow leaves) are widely grown in all soil types in sun or shade. Some of the more distinctive cultivars are:

- 'Albomarginatus' – leaves green, narrowly margined white
- 'Aureo-marginatus' – also called "Golden Euonymus", variegated green and butter yellow leaves
- 'Bravo' – green and creamy-yellow variegated leaves, upright habit
- 'Chollipo'agm
- 'Green Spire' – evergreen columnar narrow shrub
- 'Kathy' – green and white variegated, broad leaves, shorter growing than most
- 'Latifolius Albomarginatus' – green leaves with broad white margin
- 'Ovatus Aureus'agm
- 'President Gauthier' – dark green and creamy-white variegated leaves, slightly more lax habit than others
- 'Susan'agm – dark green leaves, narrowly marginated creamy-white

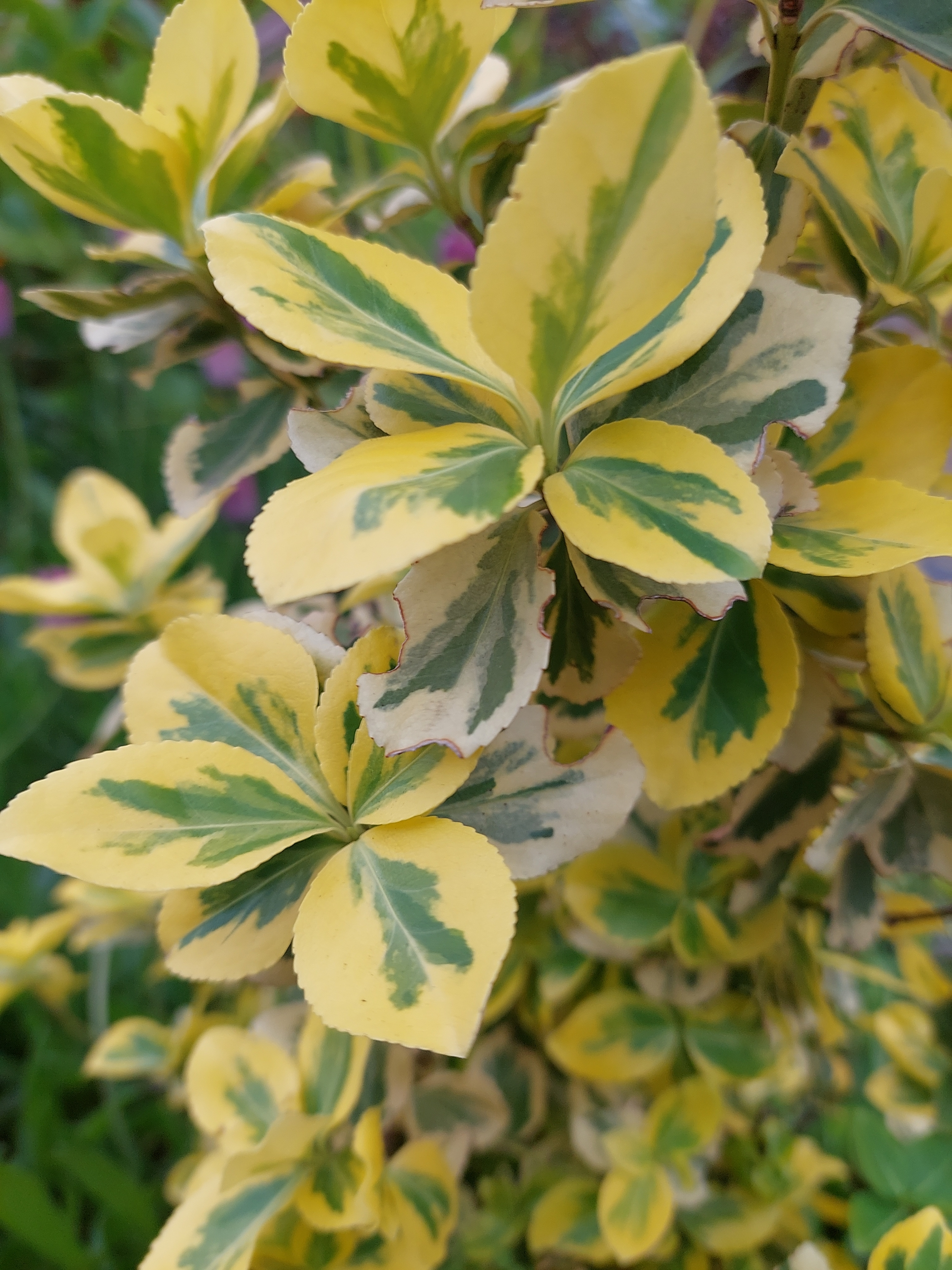
Euonymus japonicus

(those marked agm have gained the Royal Horticultural Society's Award of Garden Merit)
