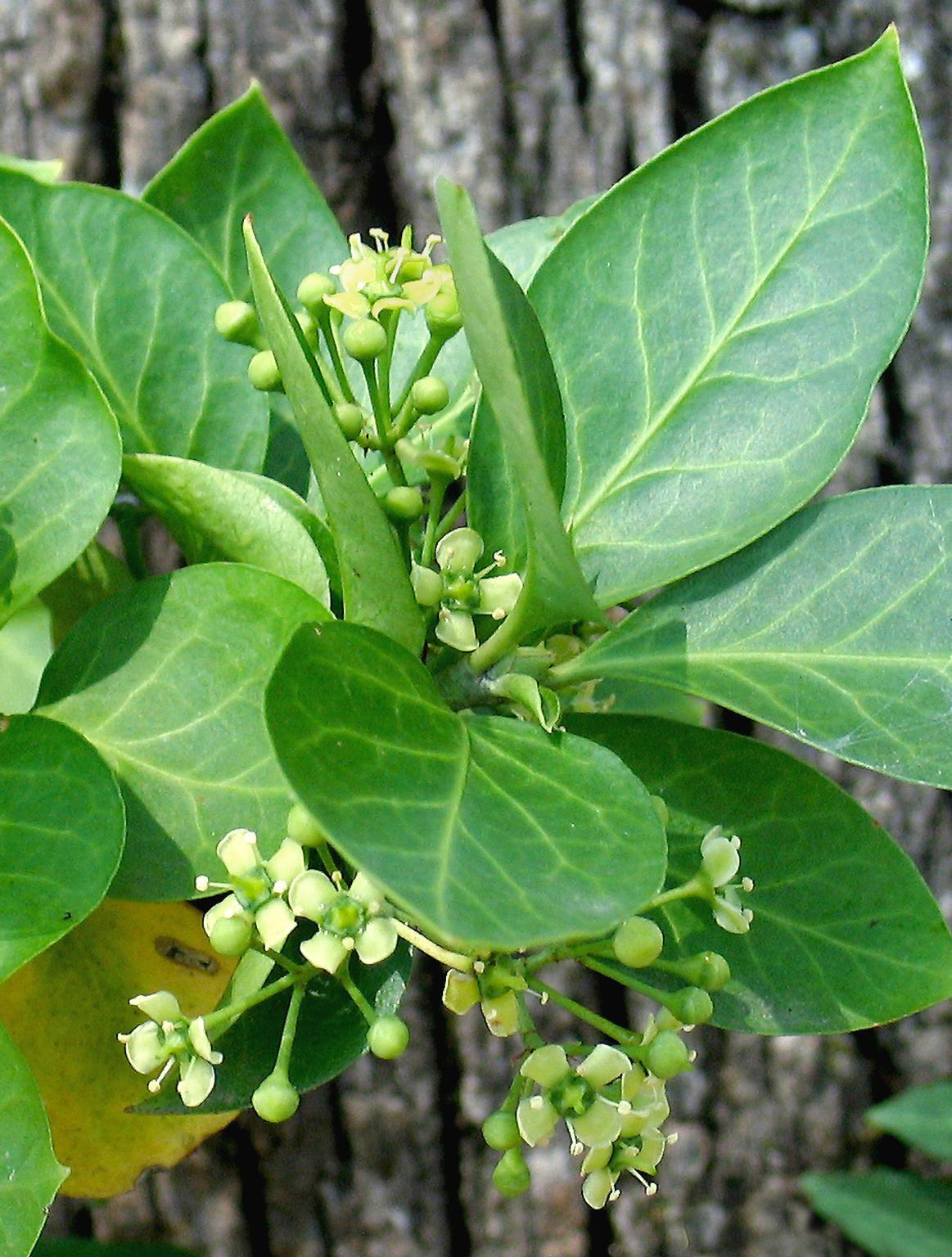

Scientific classification
- Kingdom: Plantae
- Clade: Tracheophytes
- Clade: Angiosperms
- Clade: Eudicots
- Clade: Rosids
- Order: Celastrales
- Family: Celastraceae
- Genus: Euonymus
- Species: E. fortunei

Binomial name
- Euonymus fortunei (Turcz.) Hand.-Maz.

Synonyms
- Cassine fortunei (Turcz.) Kuntze; Elaeodendron fortunei Turcz., nom. cons.

= Euonymus fortunei =

Species of flowering plant

Euonymus fortunei, the spindle, Fortune's spindle, winter creeper or wintercreeper, is a species of flowering plant in the family Celastraceae, native to east Asia, including China, Korea, the Philippines and Japan. E. fortunei is highly invasive and damaging in the United States, causing the death of trees and forest in urban areas.

== Description ==
It is an evergreen shrub which grows as a vine if provided with support. As such, it grows to 20 m (66 ft), climbing by means of small rootlets on the stems, similar to ivy (an example of convergent evolution, as the two species are not related). Like ivy, it also has a sterile non-flowering juvenile climbing or creeping phase, which on reaching high enough into the crowns of trees to get more light, develops into an adult, flowering phase without climbing rootlets.

The leaves are arranged in opposite pairs, elliptic to elliptic-ovate, 2–6 cm long and 1–3 cm broad, with finely serrated margins. The flowers are inconspicuous, 5 mm in diameter, with four small greenish-yellow petals. The fruit is a smooth, dehiscent capsule with reddish arils.

Euonymus fortunei is very similar to Euonymus japonicus, particularly in cultivation. In the wild, E. fortunei is climbing or procumbent whereas E. japonicus has an erect habit.

== Taxonomy ==
The species was described in 1863 as Elaeodendron fortunei by Nikolai Turczaninow, who named it in honour of the Scottish botanist and plant explorer Robert Fortune. The species had already been described as Euonymus hederaceus in 1851; Turczaninow's name is conserved against this earlier name. It was transferred from Elaeodendron to the genus Euonymus in 1933 by Heinrich von Handel-Mazzetti.

=== Varieties ===
As of August 2024, Plants of the World Online accepted two varieties:

- Euonymus fortunei var. fortunei – many synonyms including E. fortunei var. radicans, E. radicans; native throughout the range of the species
- Euonymus fortunei var. villosus (Nakai) H.Hara – Japan

== Distribution and habitat ==
It has an extensive native range, including many parts of China (from sea level to 3400 m elevation), India, Indonesia, Japan, Korea, Laos, Myanmar, Philippines, Thailand, and Vietnam. It has also been introduced to North America as an ornamental, and is considered an invasive species throughout much of the Eastern United States. It resembles Euonymus japonicus, which is also widely cultivated but is a shrub, without climbing roots. It also is related to a variety of similar species, including Euonymus theifolius, or Euonymus vagans and also a number of named "species" which are found only in cultivation and better treated as cultivars. Its habitats include woodlands, scrub, and forests.

== Cultivation ==
Euonymus fortunei is widely cultivated as an ornamental plant, with numerous cultivars selected for such traits as yellow, variegated and slow, dwarfed growth. It is used as a groundcover or a vine to climb walls and trees. The following cultivars have gained the Royal Horticultural Society's Award of Garden Merit:

- 'Emerald Gaiety'
- 'Emerald 'n' Gold'
- 'Emerald Surprise'
- 'Kewensis'
- 'Wolong Ghost'

Plants propagated from mature flowering stems (formerly sometimes named "f. carrierei") always grow as non-climbing shrubs. Some popular cultivars such as 'Moon Shadow' are shrub forms.

Most of the cultivated plants belong to var. radicans (Huxley 1992). It is generally considered cold hardy in USDA zones 5 to 9, and is considered an invasive species in some parts of the world, notably the eastern United States and Canada.

== Gallery ==
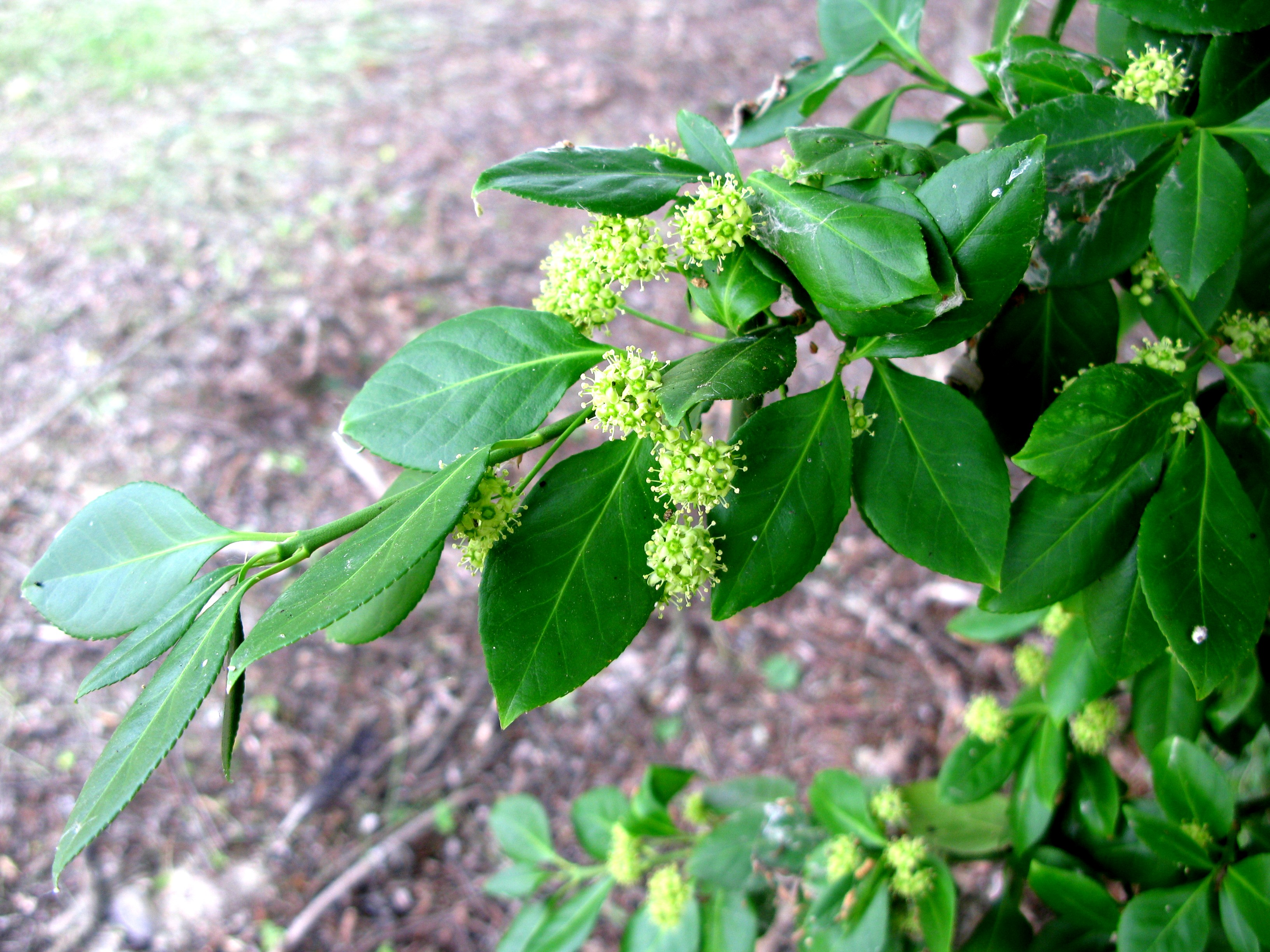
Flowers on a mature vine

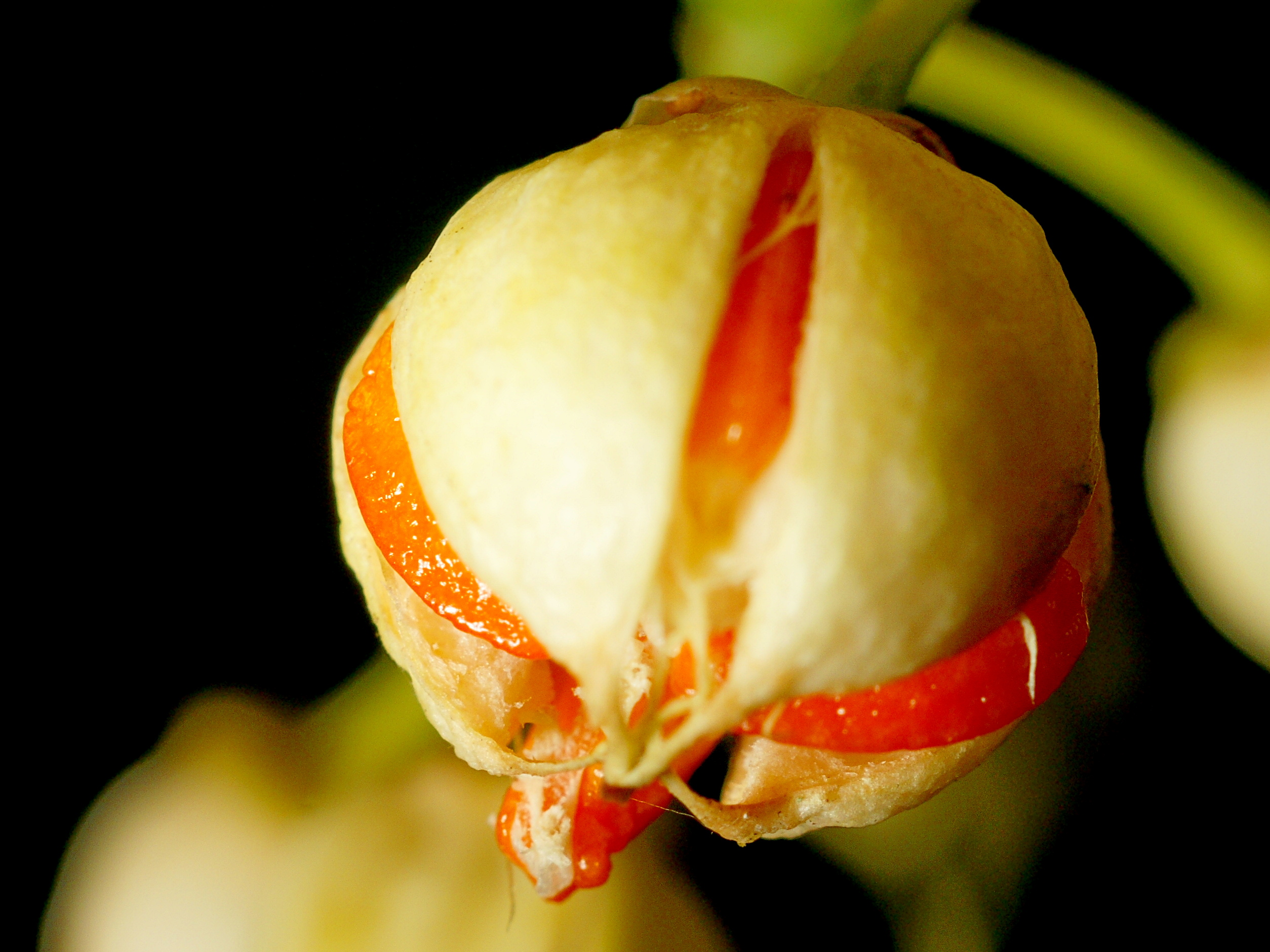
Fruit

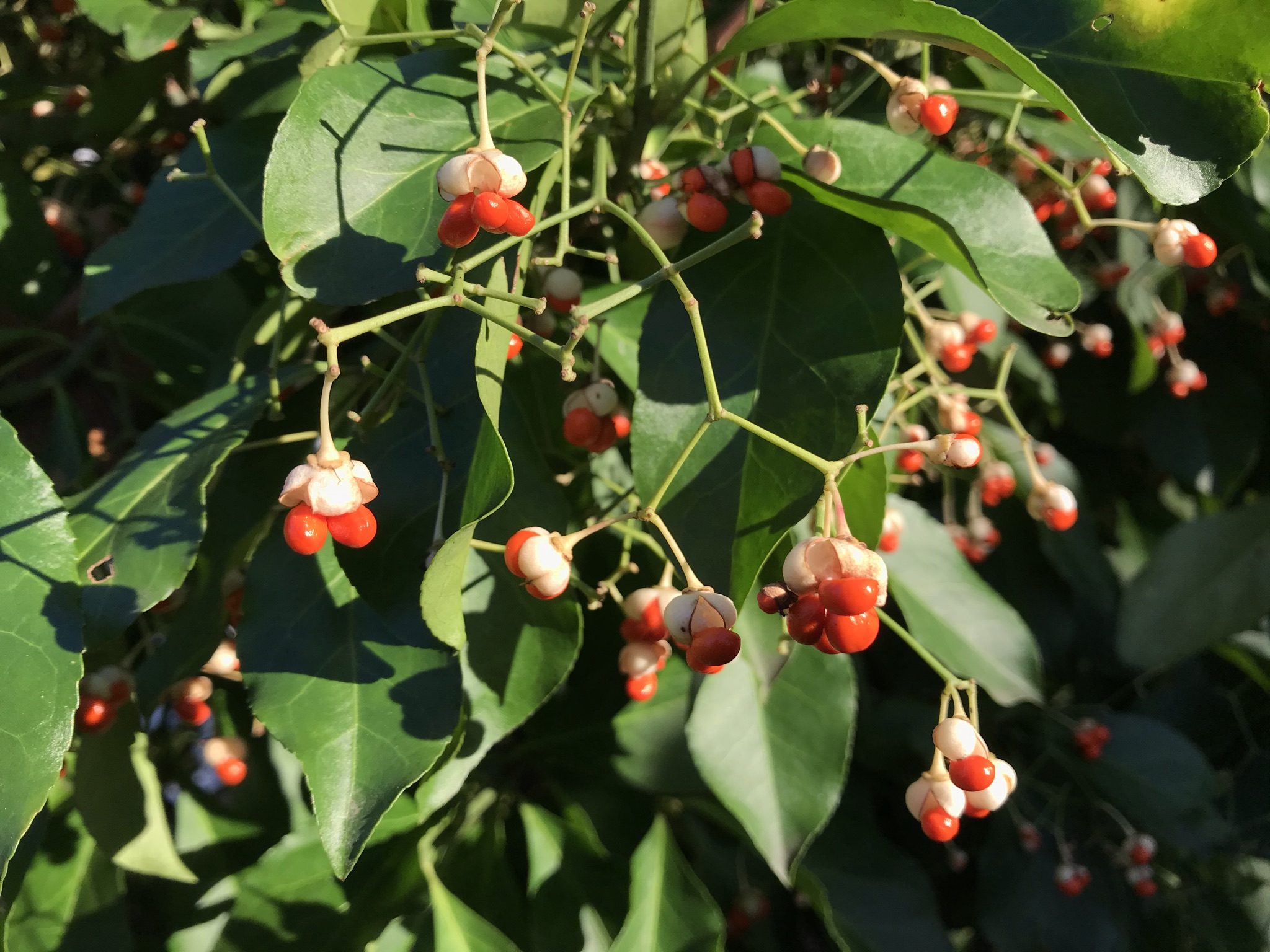
Showing its orange berries

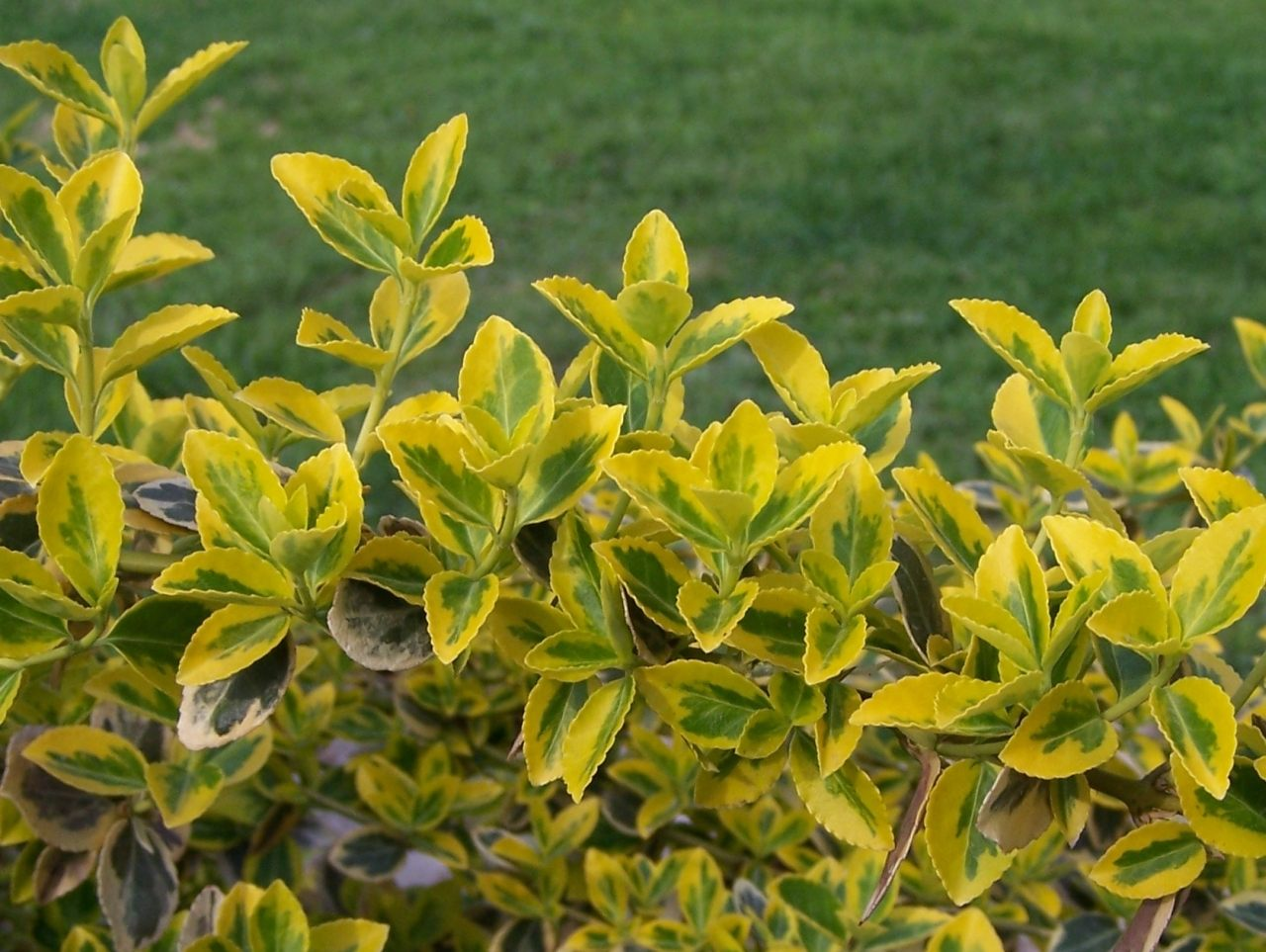
The variegated cultivar 'Emerald 'n' Gold'

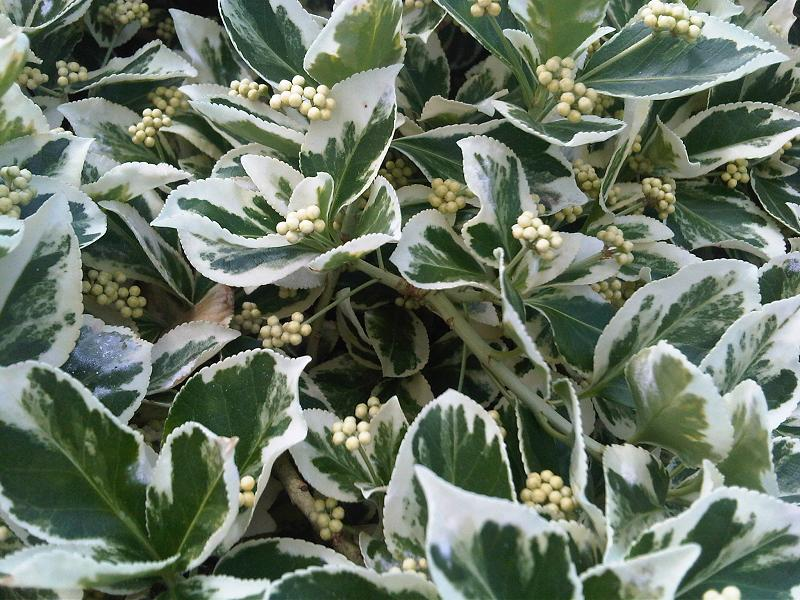
Cultivar 'Emerald Gaiety'
