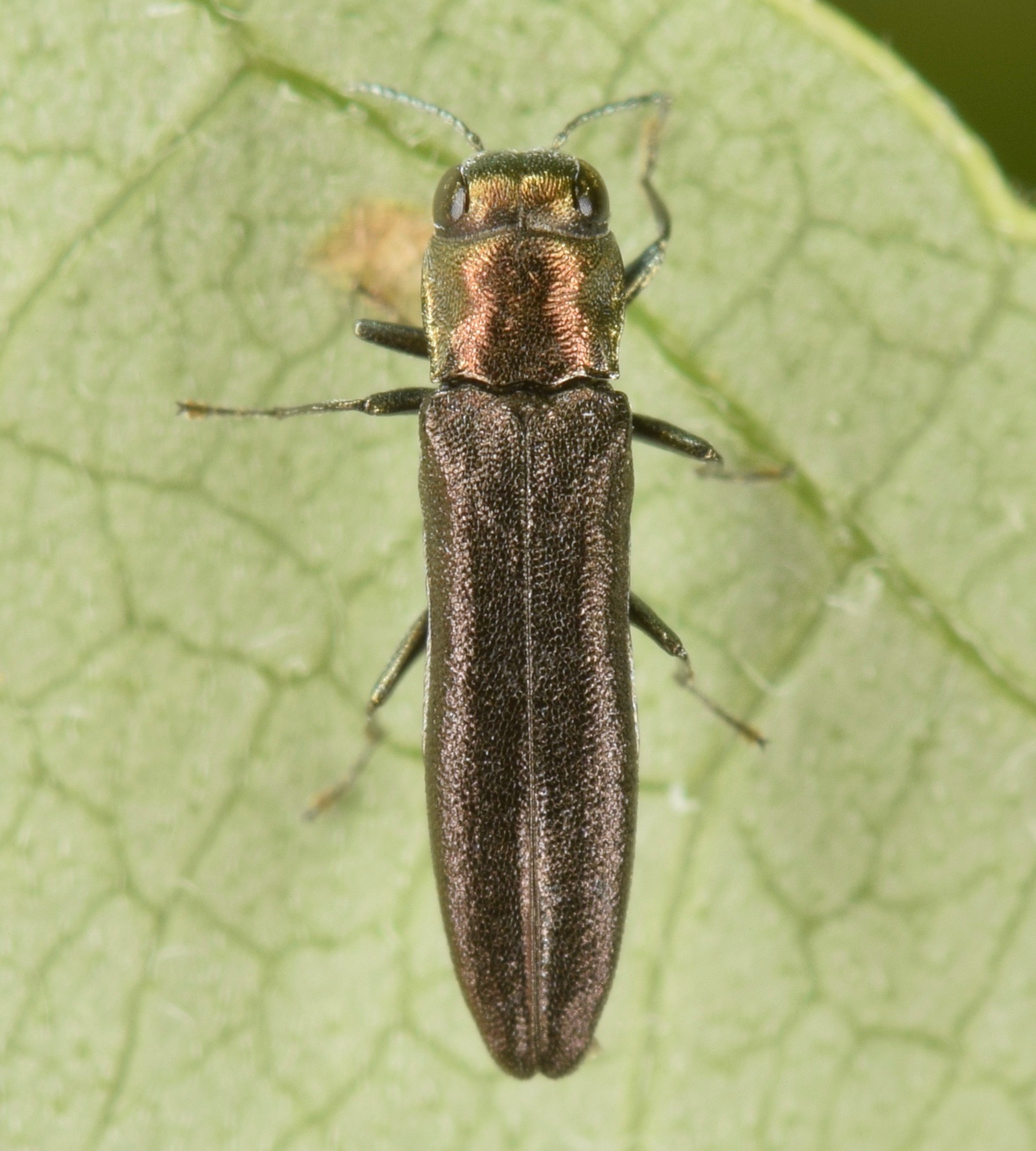
- Agrilus cephalicus

Scientific classification
- Kingdom: Animalia
- Phylum: Arthropoda
- Clade: Pancrustacea
- Class: Insecta
- Order: Coleoptera
- Suborder: Polyphaga
- Infraorder: Elateriformia
- Family: Buprestidae
- Subfamily: Agrilinae
- Tribe: Agrilini
- Subtribe: Agrilina
- Genus: Agrilus; Curtis, 1825

Type species
- Buprestis viridis Linnaeus, 1758

Diversity
- 2,877+ species

Synonyms
- Teres Harris, 1830; Euryotes Dejean, 1836; Paradomorphus Waterhouse, 1887; Samboides Kerremans, 1900; Callichitones Obenberger, 1931; Therysambus Descarpentries, & Villiers, 1967

= Agrilus =

Genus of beetles

Agrilus is a genus of jewel beetles, notable for having the largest number of species (nearly 3000) of any single genus in the animal kingdom. Species of the genus have a cosmopolitan distribution on all continents except Antarctica.

== Description ==
Individual Agrilus species feed on a wide variety of flowering plant hosts. The best known species is the emerald ash borer (Agrilus planipennis), a serious pest of ash trees, with other notable species including Agrilus biguttatus and Agrilus auroguttatus, which are pests of oak trees.

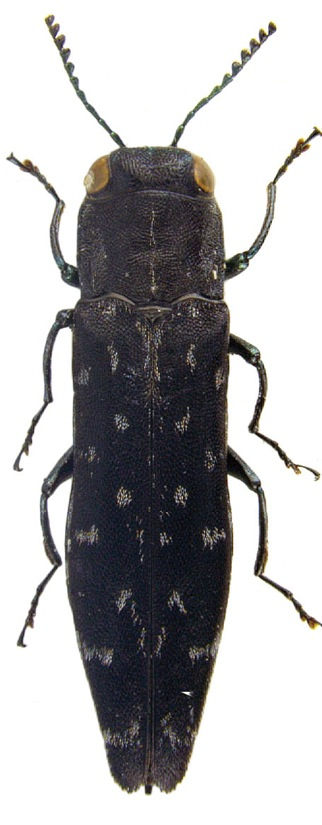
Agrilus ambiguus

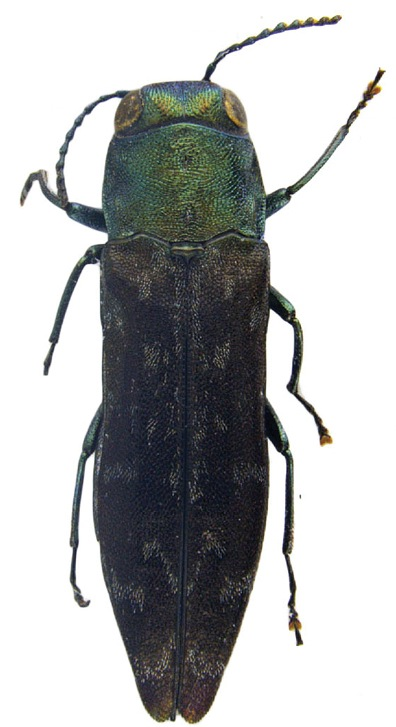
Agrilus alesi

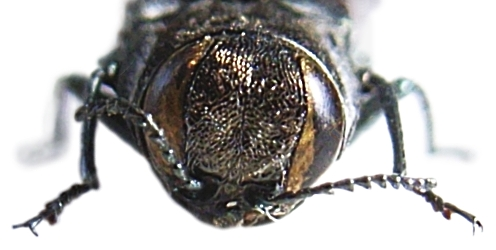
Agrilus ater

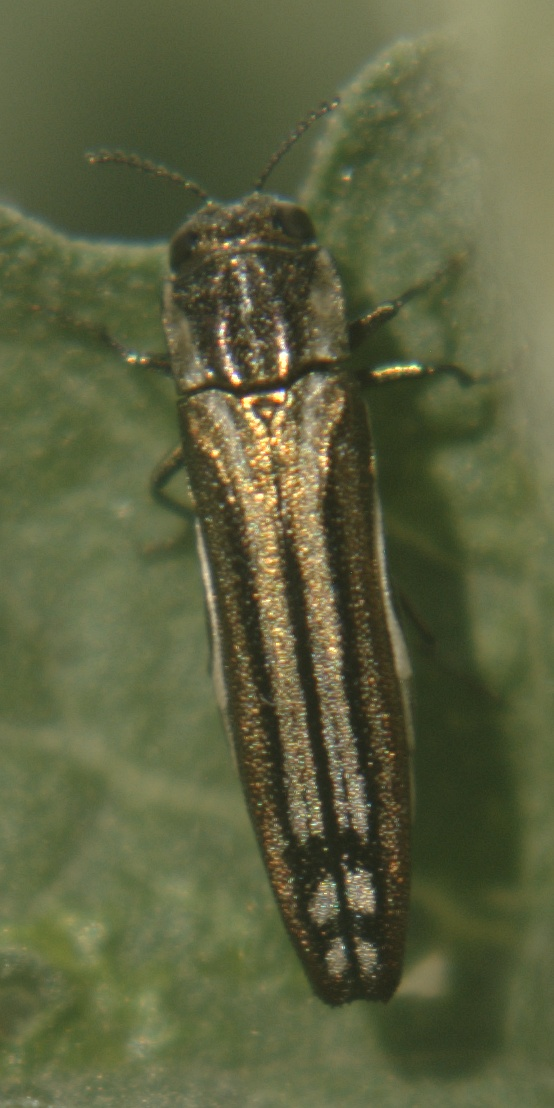
Agrilus aureus

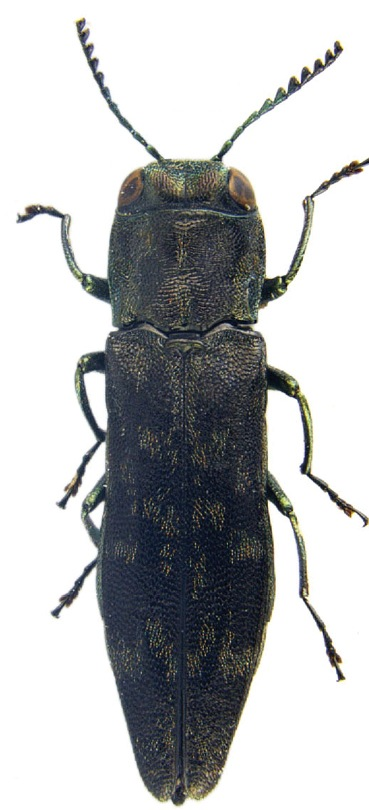
Agrilus auriventris

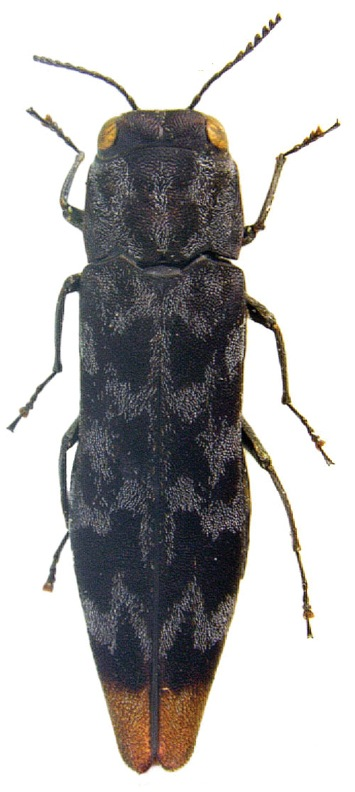
Agrilus auroapicalis

Agrilus biguttatus on a stump of a tree

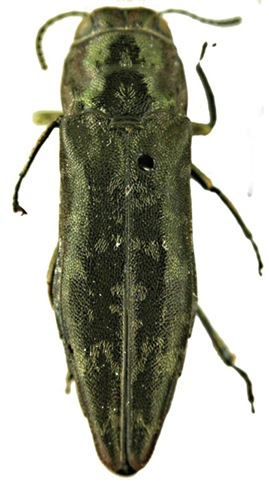
Agrilus celebicola lectotype.

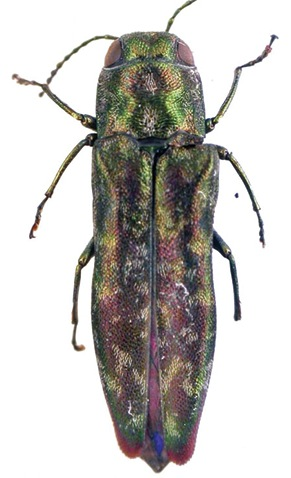
Agrilus connexus holotype.

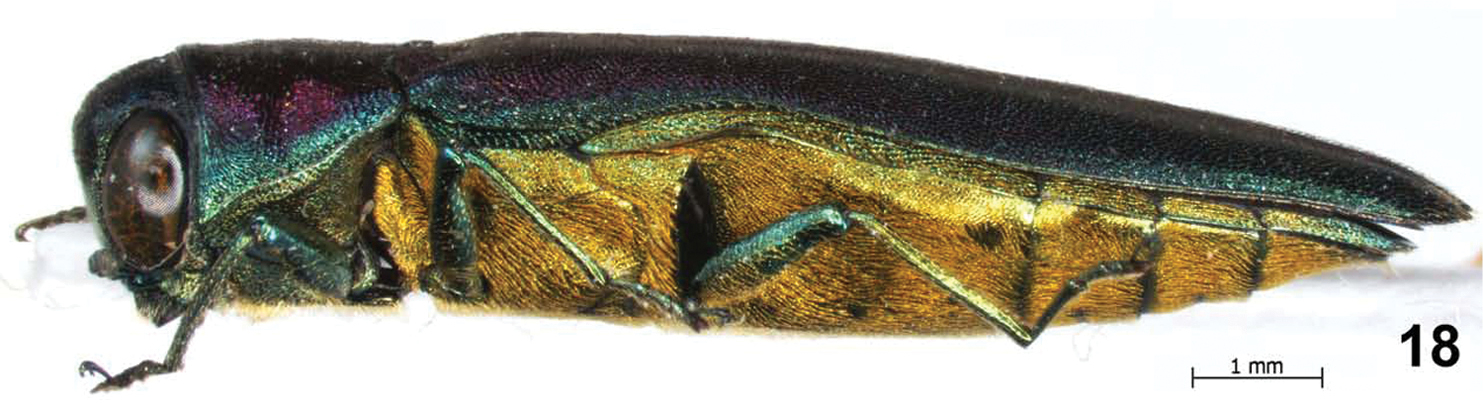
Agrilus crepuscularis holotype.

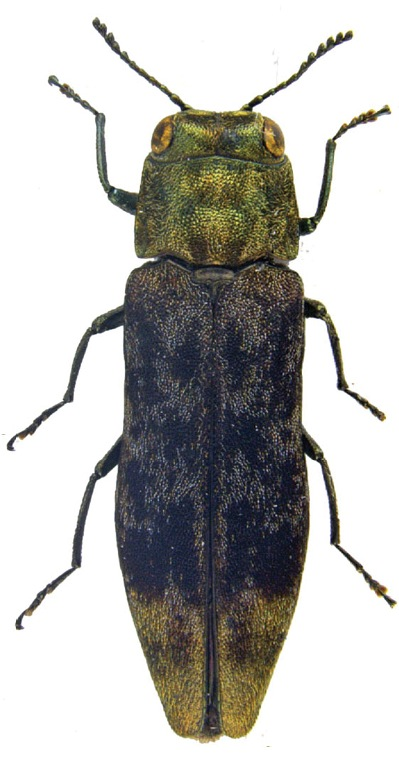
Agrilus diversornatus holotype

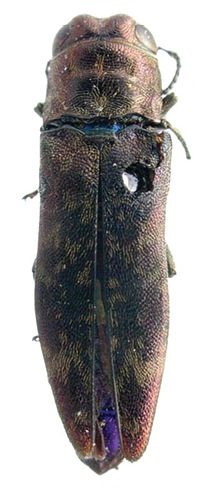
Agrilus evinadus lectotype.

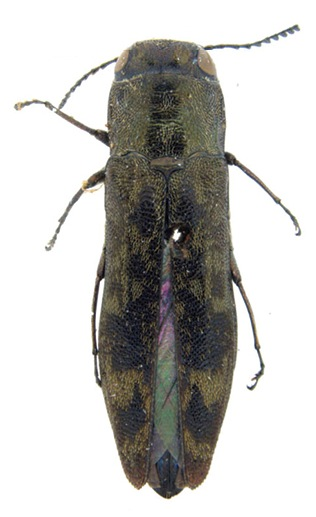
Agrilus horni lectotype.

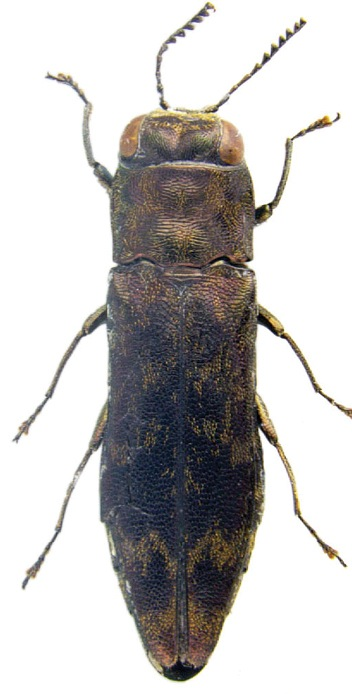
Agrilus horniellus

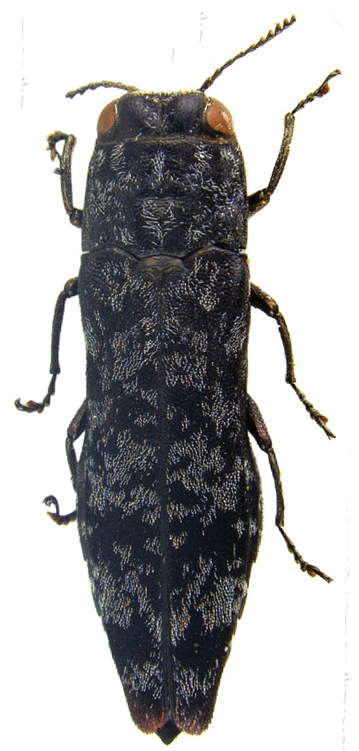
Agrilus inamoenus

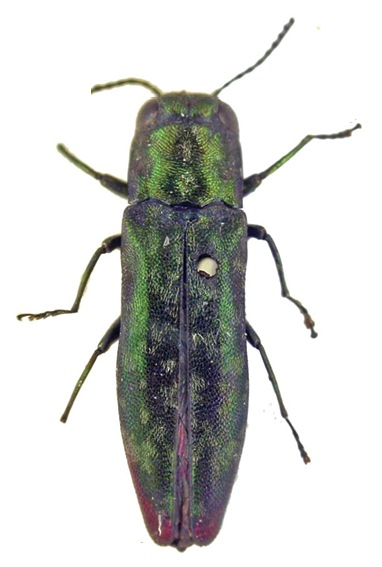
Agrilus korenskyi lectotype.

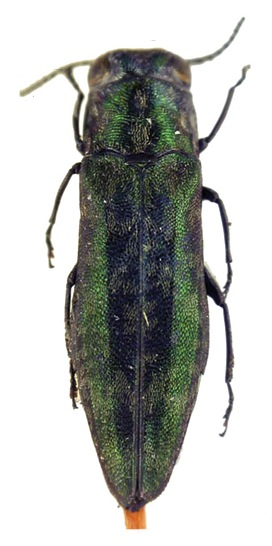
Agrilus kurandae lectotype.

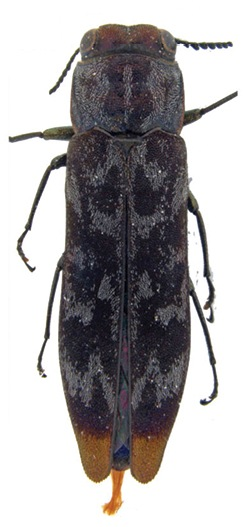
Agrilus laurenconi holotype.

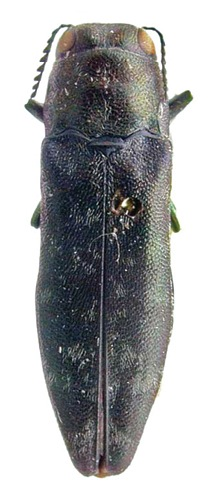
Agrilus marmoreus lectotype.

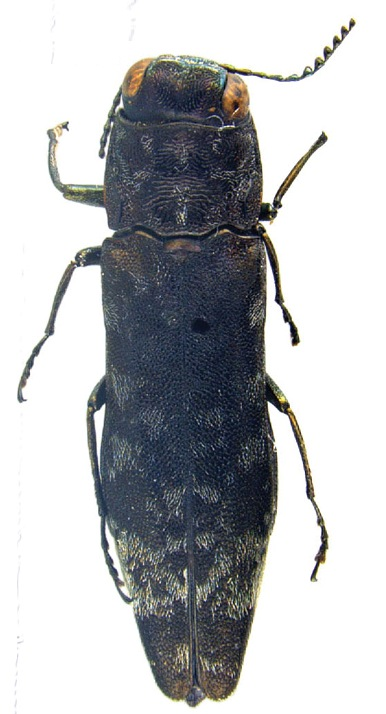
Agrilus mucidus holotype.

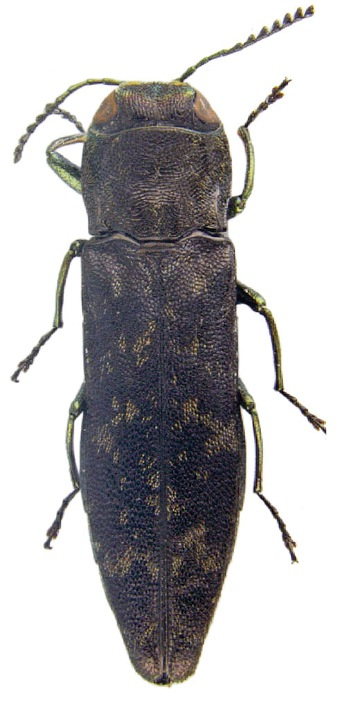
Agrilus nebulosus.

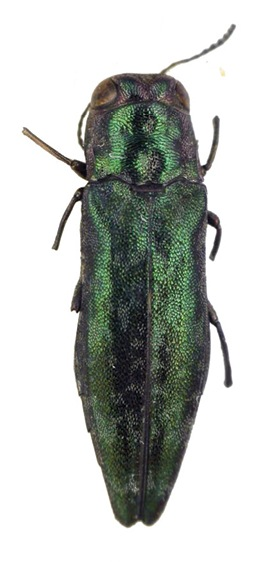
Agrilus nitidus lectotype.

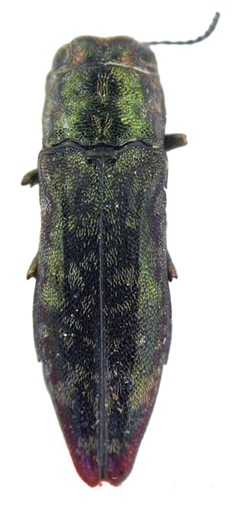
Agrilus oblatus lectotype

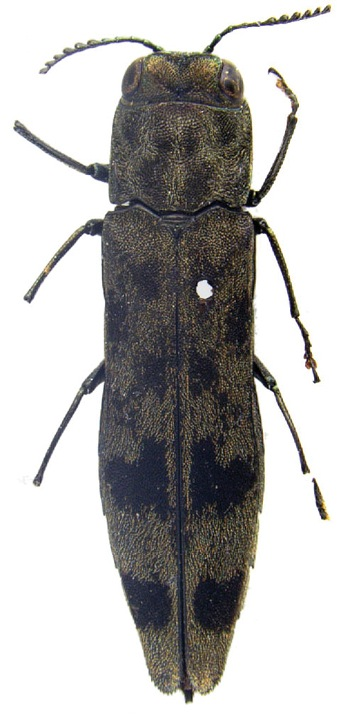
Agrilus perroti

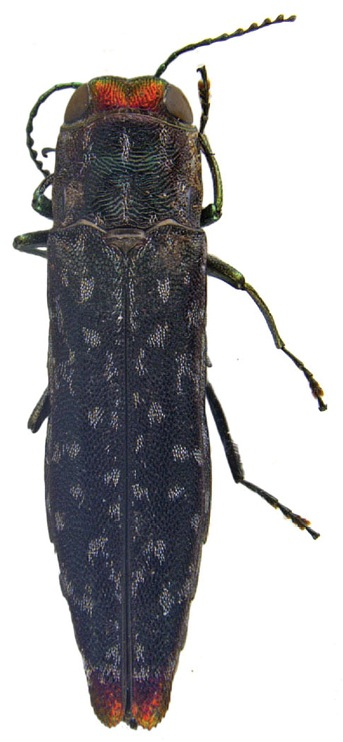
Agrilus picturatus holotype.

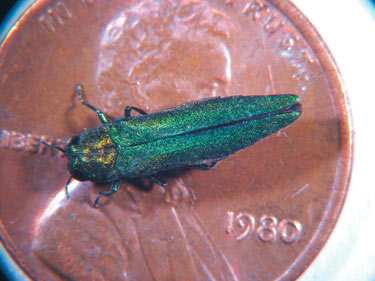
Agrilus planipennis

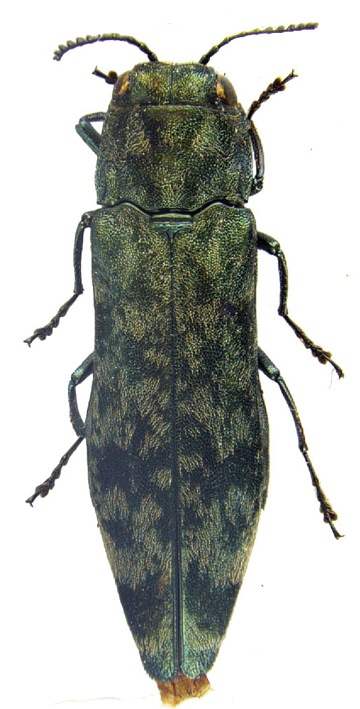
Agrilus pluvius holotype.

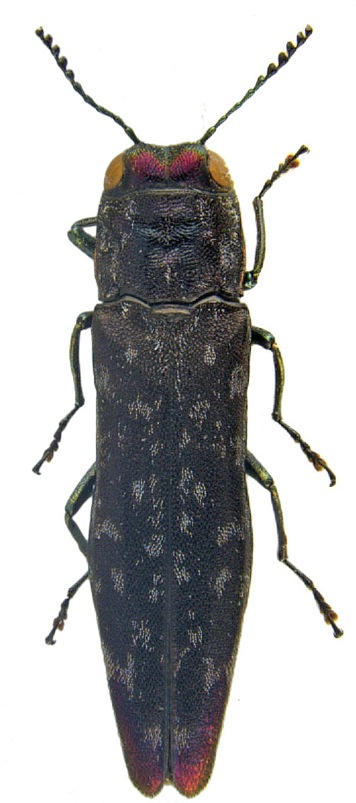
Agrilus pseudoambiguus holotype.

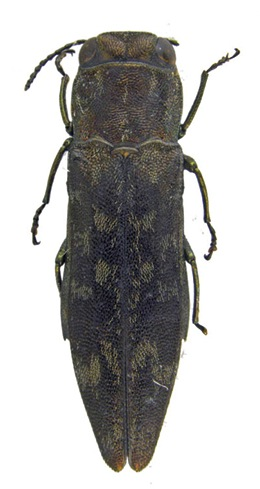
Agrilus samoensis holotype.

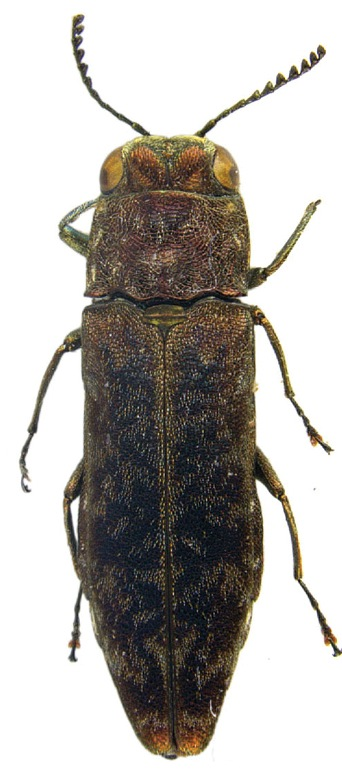
Agrilus sordidulus

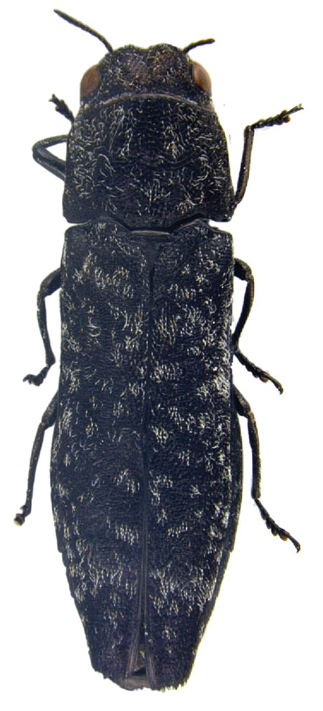
Agrilus tesselatus holotype.

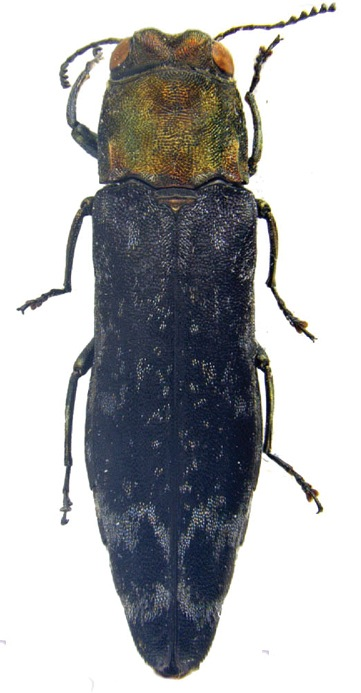
Agrilus trepanatus holotype.

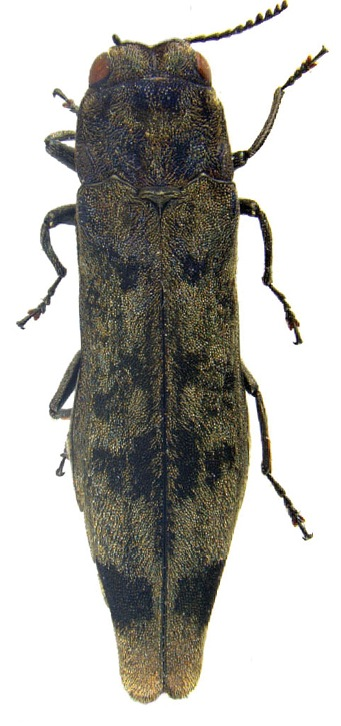
Agrilus umrongso holotype.

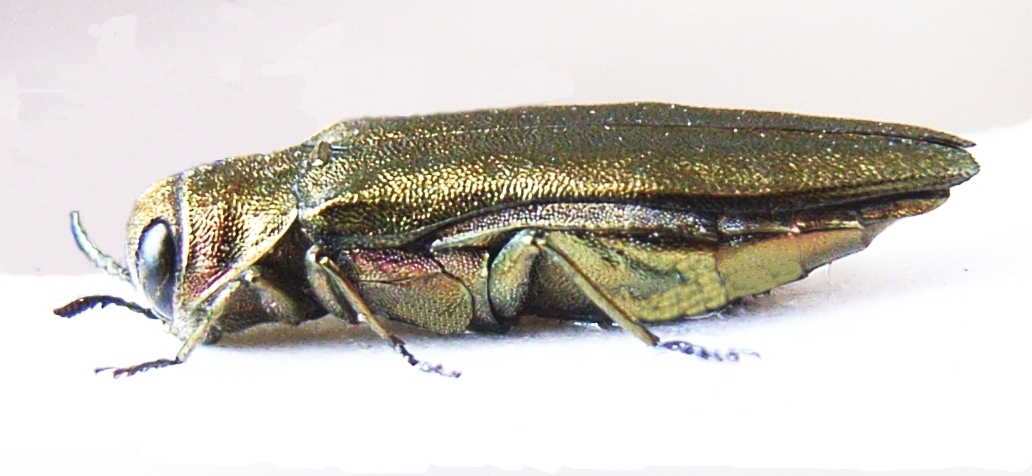
Agrilus viridis

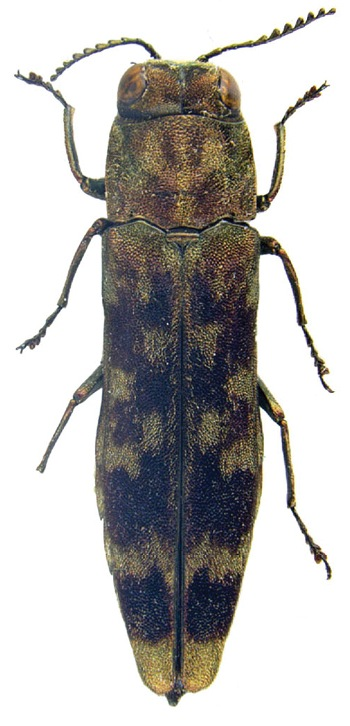
Agrilus zanthoxylumi

== Species ==
- Agrilus abantiades Descarpentries & Villiers, 1963
- Agrilus abditus Horn, 1891
- Agrilus abdominalis Saunders, 1874
- Agrilus abductus Horn, 1891
- Agrilus abeillei (Théry, 1905)
- Agrilus aberlenci Curletti, 1997
- Agrilus aberrans Kerremans, 1900
- Agrilus abhayi Baudon, 1965
- Agrilus abjectus Horn, 1891
- Agrilus abodimanganus Obenberger, 1931
- Agrilus aborigines Curletti, 2001
- Agrilus abramii Curletti & Dutto, 1999
- Agrilus abrasus Curletti & Brûlé, 2011
- Agrilus absonus Théry, 1934
- Agrilus abstersus Horn, 1891
- Agrilus abyssiniae Obenberger, 1935
- Agrilus abyssinicus Obenberger, 1917
- Agrilus acaciae Fisher, 1928
- Agrilus acacivorus Jendek & Nakládal, 2019
- Agrilus acanthopterus Harold, 1869
- Agrilus acastus Kerremans, 1913
- Agrilus accentifer Hołyński, 2019
- Agrilus acceptus Waterhouse, 1889
- Agrilus acclivis Waterhouse, 1889
- Agrilus acer Curletti, 2006
- Agrilus achardi Obenberger, 1935
- Agrilus achepei Curletti, 2002
- Agrilus achilleus Obenberger, 1935
- Agrilus ackermanni Curletti & Brûlé, 2023
- Agrilus acoloai Fisher, 1938
- Agrilus acoenonoetus Curletti & Goergen, 2011
- Agrilus acrobeles Jendek, 2021
- Agrilus acroneus Obenberger, 1942
- Agrilus acuductus Waterhouse, 1889
- Agrilus aculeatus Gory, 1841
- Agrilus aculeipennis Chevrolat, 1838
- Agrilus acuminatus Gory, 1841
- Agrilus acutipennis Mannerheim, 1837 — spotworm borer
- Agrilus acutus (Thunberg, 1787)
- Agrilus adamanteus Curletti & Pineda, 2018
- Agrilus adamas Curletti, 2000
- Agrilus adamsoni Fisher, 1944
- Agrilus adansoni Obenberger, 1933
- Agrilus addagallensis Obenberger, 1935
- Agrilus addendus Crotch, 1873
- Agrilus adelphinus Kerremans, 1895
- Agrilus adelungi Obenberger, 1933
- Agrilus adinocephalus Curletti, 2005
- Agrilus adjunctus Waterhouse, 1889
- Agrilus adlbaueri Niehuis, 1987
- Agrilus admirabilis Hespenheide, 1990
- Agrilus admonitor Obenberger, 1924
- Agrilus adonis Deyrolle, 1864
- Agrilus adspersus Kerremans, 1890
- Agrilus adustellus Thomson, 1879
- Agrilus advena Obenberger, 1931
- Agrilus aebii Pochon, 1971
- Agrilus aedituus Curletti & Brûlé, 2023
- Agrilus aegrotus Curletti & Migliore, 2014
- Agrilus aeneellus Thomson, 1878
- Agrilus aeneiceps Kerremans, 1899
- Agrilus aeneicollis Saunders, 1866
- Agrilus aeneipennis Deyrolle, 1864
- Agrilus aeneocephalus Fisher, 1928
- Agrilus aeneoclarus Bourgoin, 1922
- Agrilus aeneocupreus Kerremans, 1899
- Agrilus aeneolus Deyrolle, 1864
- Agrilus aeneomaculatus Deyrolle, 1864
- Agrilus aenescentellus Obenberger, 1936
- Agrilus aeneus Gory & Laporte, 1837
- Agrilus aequalis Kerremans, 1900
- Agrilus aequatoris Obenberger, 1917
- Agrilus aequicollis Eschscholtz, 1822
- Agrilus aereus Saunders, 1866
- Agrilus aerosus Ganglbauer, 1890
- Agrilus aesquilius Obenberger, 1947
- Agrilus aestimatus Kerremans, 1897
- Agrilus aeta Hołyński, 2018
- Agrilus aethiops Hespenheide, 1990
- Agrilus affabilis Kerremans, 1897
- Agrilus affinis Waterhouse, 1889
- Agrilus africanus Kerremans, 1899
- Agrilus agnatulus Obenberger, 1931
- Agrilus agnatus Kerremans, 1892
- Agrilus agnitus Curletti & Brûlé, 2013
- Agrilus agoretus Obenberger, 1935
- Agrilus agrestis Deyrolle, 1864
- Agrilus agrius Obenberger, 1935
- Agrilus agronomus Obenberger, 1935
- Agrilus aguinaldoi Fisher, 1921
- Agrilus aheu Jendek, 2021
- Agrilus alacris Kerremans, 1896
- Agrilus alajuelensis Hespenheide, 2012
- Agrilus alajuelenensis Hespenheide, 2012
- Agrilus alas Jendek, 2021
- Agrilus alashanensis Obenberger, 1936
- Agrilus alatus Curletti & Pineda, 2019
- Agrilus albert Curletti, 2021
- Agrilus albertianus Descarpentries & Villiers, 1967
- Agrilus albizivorus Jendek & Nakládal, 2019
- Agrilus albicollis (Waterhouse, 1887)
- Agrilus albizziae Fisher, 1935
- Agrilus albocomus Fisher, 1928
- Agrilus albofasciatus Waterhouse, 1889
- Agrilus albogaster Deyrolle, 1864
- Agrilus albogularis Gory, 1841
- Agrilus albolatus Deyrolle, 1864
- Agrilus alboluteus Curletti, 1995
- Agrilus albomaculifer Saunders, 1870
- Agrilus albomarginatus Fiori, 1906
- Agrilus albonotatus Thomson, 1879
- Agrilus albopictus Kerremans, 1892
- Agrilus albopunctatus Deyrolle, 1864
- Agrilus alborubronigrus Hespenheide, 1990
- Agrilus albosericellus Obenberger, 1924
- Agrilus albostictus Kerremans, 1913
- Agrilus albovariegatus Hespenheide, 1990
- Agrilus albovittatus Thomson, 1879
- Agrilus alcinous Obenberger, 1935
- Agrilus alemani Dugès, 1891
- Agrilus alesi Obenberger, 1935
- Agrilus aleus Gory, 1841
- Agrilus alexandri Obenberger, 1933
- Agrilus algarrobalis Juárez-Noé & González-Coronado, 2022
- Agrilus algiricus Obenberger, 1923
- Agrilus aliciae Bellamy, 2005
- Agrilus alienus Curletti & Brûlé, 2015
- Agrilus alini Curletti, 2016
- Agrilus allardi Curletti, 1997
- Agrilus allectorellus Thomson, 1879
- Agrilus allisoni Curletti, 2006
- Agrilus alluaudi Kerremans, 1903
- Agrilus almenus Gory, 1841
- Agrilus alobatus Jendek, 2021
- Agrilus alpenae Baudon, 1968
- Agrilus alpha Obenberger, 1935
- Agrilus altitudinalis Curletti, 2015
- Agrilus alutaceicollis Obenberger, 1930
- Agrilus akiyamai Hołyński, 2019
- Agrilus amamioshimanus Kurosawa, 1964
- Agrilus amazo Obenberger, 1933
- Agrilus amazonicus Kerremans, 1897
- Agrilus ambifarius Curletti, 2006
- Agrilus ambiguus Kerremans, 1895
- Agrilus ambodimanganus Obenberger, 1931
- Agrilus amelanchieri Knull, 1944
- Agrilus amethysticollis Deyrolle, 1864
- Agrilus amhar Obenberger, 1935
- Agrilus amicalis Obenberger, 1922
- Agrilus amicus Deyrolle, 1864
- Agrilus amoenulus Kerremans, 1903
- Agrilus amorphus Kerremans, 1900
- Agrilus amphiaraus Obenberger, 1936
- Agrilus amphion Obenberger, 1935
- Agrilus ampliatus Kerremans, 1900
- Agrilus amplinotus Jendek & Nakládal, 2014
- Agrilus amplicollis Kerremans, 1888
- Agrilus amplinotus Jendek & Nakládal, 2017
- Agrilus amulius Obenberger, 1936
- Agrilus anabates Obenberger, 1924
- Agrilus anachlorus Obenberger, 1924
- Agrilus analis Kerremans, 1896
- Agrilus anceps Curletti & Migliore, 2014
- Agrilus andersoni Hespenheide, 2008
- Agrilus andresi Obenberger, 1920
- Agrilus androgynus Curletti, 2006
- Agrilus andrusi Baudon, 1968
- Agrilus angelicus Horn, 1891
- Agrilus angelinii Cristiano, 2012
- Agrilus angolanus Obenberger, 1935
- Agrilus angolensis Théry, 1947
- Agrilus angolus Bellamy, 1998
- Agrilus angulatus (Fabricius, 1798)
- Agrilus angustus (Chevrolat, 1835)
- Agrilus animatus Fisher, 1944
- Agrilus annamitica Hołyński, 2020
- Agrilus annoi Baudon, 1968
- Agrilus anomus Obenberger, 1935
- Agrilus antali Obenberger, 1933
- Agrilus antelucanus Curletti & Brûlé, 2017
- Agrilus antennalis Descarpentries, 1959
- Agrilus antennata Bílý, 2017
- Agrilus antennatus Waterhouse, 1889
- Agrilus antepodex Thomson, 1878
- Agrilus anthaxioides Hespenheide in Hespenheide & Bellamy, 2009
- Agrilus anthracinus Deyrolle, 1864
- Agrilus anthracites Curletti & Brûlé, 2017
- Agrilus anthrax Obenberger, 1931
- Agrilus antiquus Mulsant & Rey, 1863
- Agrilus antoinei Curletti & Brûlé, 2013
- Agrilus antonii Obenberger, 1933
- Agrilus antonkozlovi Curletti & Brûlé, 2018
- Agrilus anxius Gory, 1841 — bronze birch borer
- Agrilus aonikenk Cid-Arcos & Pineda, 2019
- Agrilus apaturus Obenberger, 1935
- Agrilus apellos Pochon, 1971
- Agrilus apicalis Waterhouse, 1889
- Agrilus apicaureus Jendek in Jendek & Grebennikov, 2009
- Agrilus arabeon Obenberger, 1935
- Agrilus araeus Obenberger, 1935
- Agrilus aragonis Obenberger, 1933
- Agrilus aramis Jendek & Grebennikov, 2018
- Agrilus araneipes Obenberger, 1932
- Agrilus arator Jendek, 2021
- Agrilus araxenus Iablokoff-Khnzorian, 1960
- Agrilus arbuti Fisher, 1928
- Agrilus archaicus Obenberger, 1916
- Agrilus arcuatus (Say, 1825)
- Agrilus ardoini Descarpentries & Villiers, 1963
- Agrilus ardosiellus Obenberger, 1933
- Agrilus arenatus Curletti, 1997
- Agrilus areolatus Fairmaire, 1898
- Agrilus arestini Théry, 1937
- Agrilus argenteornatus Obenberger, 1924
- Agrilus argentinus Kerremans, 1903
- Agrilus argodi Obenberger, 1935
- Agrilus argus Obenberger, 1935
- Agrilus argyrograptus Obenberger, 1933
- Agrilus argyrothrix Obenberger, 1935
- Agrilus argythamniae Hespenheide & Westcott, 2011
- Agrilus aridosus Obenberger, 1936
- Agrilus aries Jendek & Grebennikov, 2018
- Agrilus arisanus Miwa & Chûjô, 1940
- Agrilus aristaeus Kerremans, 1913
- Agrilus aritai Tôyama, 1985
- Agrilus arizonicus Obenberger, 1936
- Agrilus arizonus Knull, 1934
- Agrilus armatorius Jendek, 2021
- Agrilus armillatus Kerremans, 1903
- Agrilus armipes Jendek & Grebennikov, 2018
- Agrilus armstrongi Obenberger, 1959
- Agrilus arnoenus Curletti & Brûlé, 2014
- Agrilus arnoldi Curletti, 2020
- Agrilus arnus Gory, 1841
- Agrilus arriagadai Curletti & Pineda, 2022
- Agrilus arsenevi Jendek in Jendek & Grebennikov, 2009
- Agrilus artagnan Hołyński, 2019
- Agrilus artevansi Curletti & Bellamy, 2006
- Agrilus aruensis Jendek, 2017
- Agrilus asahinai Kurosawa, 1956
- Agrilus ascanius Deyrolle, 1864
- Agrilus ashlocki Baudon, 1968
- Agrilus asiaticus Kerremans, 1898
- Agrilus asperulus Waterhouse, 1889
- Agrilus assamensis Obenberger, 1936
- Agrilus assimilis Hope, 1846
- Agrilus assinicus Kerremans, 1903
- Agrilus atahualpa Obenberger, 1935
- Agrilus ateles Jendek, 2017
- Agrilus ater (Linnaeus, 1767)
- Agrilus athos Jendek & Grebennikov, 2018
- Agrilus atkinsoni Hespenheide, 1990
- Agrilus atlanticus Curletti, 2005
- Agrilus atomus Théry, 1904
- Agrilus atratulus Obenberger, 1924
- Agrilus atricornis Fisher, 1928
- Agrilus atripennis Chevrolat, 1835
- Agrilus atriplicis Théry, 1900
- Agrilus atrox Curletti & Brûlé, 2017
- Agrilus attalicus Curletti & Ong, 2022
- Agrilus attenuatus Fisher, 1921
- Agrilus attila Obenberger, 1930
- Agrilus audax Horn, 1891
- Agrilus augustus Obenberger, 1933
- Agrilus aurantioguttatus Hespenheide, 1990
- Agrilus aurarius (Kerremans, 1892)
- Agrilus auratilis Bourgoin, 1922
- Agrilus auratolineatus Curletti & Brûlé, 2011
- Agrilus auratus Deyrolle, 1864
- Agrilus aurelianus Obenberger, 1947
- Agrilus aureoangulatus Jendek, 2021
- Agrilus aureocoerulans Obenberger, 1924
- Agrilus aureofasciatus Jendek, 2011
- Agrilus aureus Chevrolat, 1838
- Agrilus auriceps Kerremans, 1899
- Agrilus auricollis Kiesenwetter, 1857
- Agrilus aurifrons Kerremans, 1897
- Agrilus aurigaster Jendek, 2011
- Agrilus auriginus Curletti, 2018
- Agrilus aurilaterus Waterhouse, 1889
- Agrilus aurinotus Jendek, 2011
- Agrilus auripes Deyrolle, 1864
- Agrilus auripilis Deyrolle, 1864
- Agrilus auristernum Obenberger, 1924
- Agrilus aurithorax Jendek, 2011
- Agrilus auritinctus Curletti, 2003
- Agrilus auritus Chevrolat, 1838
- Agrilus auriventris Saunders, 1873
- Agrilus aurivestis Hołyński, 2018
- Agrilus auroapicalis Kurosawa, 1957
- Agrilus aurocephalus Gory, 1841
- Agrilus aurociliatus Théry, 1904
- Agrilus aurocyaneus Kerremans, 1900
- Agrilus aurofissum Curletti, 2019
- Agrilus auroguttatus Schaeffer, 1905
- Agrilus auroornatus Obenberger, 1940
- Agrilus auropictus Kerremans, 1912
- Agrilus auroscutatus Curletti & Brûlé, 2011
- Agrilus aurosus Descarpentries & Villiers, 1963
- Agrilus aurovittatus Hope, 1846
- Agrilus aurulentus Hespenheide, 1990
- Agrilus australasiae Gory & Laporte, 1837
- Agrilus avarus Curletti & Brûlé, 2021
- Agrilus avifaecus Hespenheide & Westcott, 2018
- Agrilus avulsus Kerremans, 1903
- Agrilus azureus Kerremans, 1899
- Agrilus babai Tôyama, 1988
- Agrilus babaulti Théry, 1930
- Agrilus baboquivariae Fisher, 1928
- Agrilus babuinus Curletti & Dutto, 1999
- Agrilus bacan Jendek & Grebennikov, 2018
- Agrilus bacchaeus Obenberger, 1936
- Agrilus bacchanalis Curletti & Brûlé, 2021
- Agrilus bacchus Kerremans, 1913
- Agrilus bachma Jendek, 2021
- Agrilus bacillus Jendek, 2021
- Agrilus badius Kerremans, 1897
- Agrilus baeri Obenberger, 1933
- Agrilus bahianus Curletti, 2020
- Agrilus bai Jendek, 2011
- Agrilus baili Curletti, 2005
- Agrilus baitetanus Curletti, 2006
- Agrilus baiyangling Jendek & Nakládal, 2019
- Agrilus bakeri Kerremans, 1914
- Agrilus balaenoides Waterhouse, 1889
- Agrilus balatanus Curletti & Brûlé, 2015
- Agrilus balazuci Descarpentries & Villiers, 1963
- Agrilus balena Curletti, 1998
- Agrilus baliolus Kerremans, 1897
- Agrilus balloui Fisher, 1938
- Agrilus balnearis Kerremans, 1914
- Agrilus banahaoensis Fisher, 1921
- Agrilus bancoi Curletti, 2013
- Agrilus banguinus Obenberger, 1931
- Agrilus banksi Obenberger, 1933
- Agrilus baobdil Obenberger, 1913
- Agrilus baoloc Jendek, 2001
- Agrilus barberi Fisher, 1928
- Agrilus barberoi Curletti, 2002
- Agrilus barbutulus Curletti, 1998
- Agrilus bareinus Obenberger, 1923
- Agrilus baringanus Obenberger, 1931
- Agrilus barkerellus Obenberger, 1936
- Agrilus barkeri Obenberger, 1931
- Agrilus barombinus Obenberger, 1935
- Agrilus baroni Gory & Laporte, 1837
- Agrilus barrandei Obenberger, 1933
- Agrilus barrati Descarpentries & Villiers, 1963
- Agrilus barri Hespenheide & Westcott, 2011
- Agrilus barriesi Curletti, 2011
- Agrilus barriosi Curletti, 2000
- Agrilus bartolozzii Curletti, 2000
- Agrilus basalis Chevrolat, 1835
- Agrilus basilaris Waterhouse, 1889
- Agrilus basilewskyanus Descarpentries & Villiers, 1963
- Agrilus basseti Curletti, 2000
- Agrilus bassetianus Curletti, 2003
- Agrilus bastianae Baudon, 1965
- Agrilus bathyllus Obenberger, 1933
- Agrilus baudoni Jendek, 2021
- Agrilus baudoniorum Jendek, 2021
- Agrilus bauhiniae Fisher, 1935
- Agrilus baviensis Descarpentries & Villiers, 1963
- Agrilus baxii Gory & Laporte, 1837
- Agrilus bayoni Kerremans, 1910
- Agrilus beatissimus Descarpentries & Villiers, 1963
- Agrilus beauprei Théry, 1930
- Agrilus beckeri Curletti, 2000
- Agrilus bedelianus Obenberger, 1933
- Agrilus bednariki Jendek, 2021
- Agrilus belides Obenberger, 1936
- Agrilus belizoni Curletti & Brûlé, 2023
- Agrilus bellamyi Hespenheide, 2010
- Agrilus bellator Kerremans, 1900
- Agrilus bellicus Kerremans, 1903
- Agrilus bellus Waterhouse, 1889
- Agrilus belzebuth Obenberger, 1935
- Agrilus benevolus Kerremans, 1903
- Agrilus beniensis Fisher, 1925
- Agrilus benjamini Fisher, 1928
- Agrilus bennigseni Kerremans, 1899
- Agrilus bentseni Knull, 1954
- Agrilus berberus Curletti, 2003
- Agrilus bergi Kerremans, 1903
- Agrilus bergrothi Obenberger, 1923
- Agrilus berkwae Curletti, 2002
- Agrilus bernardii Descarpentries & Villiers, 1963
- Agrilus bespencus Barr, 2008
- Agrilus bettotanus Fisher, 1930
- Agrilus betulanigrae MacRae, 2003
- Agrilus betuleti (Ratzeberg, 1837)
- Agrilus biakanus Curletti, 2006
- Agrilus biankii Obenberger, 1933
- Agrilus biasoni Baudon, 1968
- Agrilus bicarinatus Waterhouse, 1889
- Agrilus bicoloropsis Bellamy & Hespenheide, 2002
- Agrilus bicolorifrons Jendek & Grebennikov, 2018
- Agrilus bicoloripennis Jendek, 2017
- Agrilus bicornis Théry, 1930
- Agrilus bicuspidatus Jendek, 2011
- Agrilus bidentulus Ganglbauer, 1890
- Agrilus biemarginatus Waterhouse, 1889
- Agrilus bifenestratus Thomson, 1878
- Agrilus bifenestrellatus Obenberger, 1935
- Agrilus bifidus Curletti & Brûlé, 2014
- Agrilus biformis Hespenheide, 1990
- Agrilus biformissimus Jendek, 2021
- Agrilus bifoveicollis Kerremans, 1897
- Agrilus bifoveolatus Kerremans, 1895
- Agrilus biguttatus (Fabricius, 1776) — oak splendour beetle
- Agrilus bihamatus Deyrolle, 1864
- Agrilus biimpressus Waterhouse, 1889
- Agrilus bikini Curletti & Brûlé, 2013
- Agrilus bilby Curletti, 2001
- Agrilus bilineatus (Weber, 1801)
- Agrilus bilobus Obenberger, 1935
- Agrilus bilyanus Jendek & Nakládal, 2018
- Agrilus bilyi Curletti, 1997
- Agrilus bimaculatus Dugès, 1891
- Agrilus binderi (Obenberger, 1924)
- Agrilus binhensis Descarpentries & Villiers, 1963
- Agrilus binodifrons Obenberger, 1935
- Agrilus binotatus Gory, 1841
- Agrilus biplagiatus (Waterhouse, 1889)
- Agrilus birmanicus Kerremans, 1892
- Agrilus biscrensis Pic, 1918
- Agrilus bisignatus Fisher, 1921
- Agrilus bison Curletti & Brûlé, 2015
- Agrilus bispinosus Carter, 1924
- Agrilus bistrilineatus Obenberger, 1935
- Agrilus bituberculatus Jendek, 2007
- Agrilus bivittatellus Obenberger, 1935
- Agrilus bivittiger Obenberger, 1923
- Agrilus blairi Bourgoin, 1925
- Agrilus blairianus Obenberger, 1935
- Agrilus blanchardii Saunders, 1871
- Agrilus blanditiosus Obenberger, 1933
- Agrilus blandulus Guérin-Ménéville, 1844
- Agrilus blandus Horn, 1891
- Agrilus blastos Jendek, 2021
- Agrilus blattaeicollis Bourgoin, 1922
- Agrilus boanoi Curletti, 1998
- Agrilus bocaki Jendek, 2011
- Agrilus bojasinskii Holynski, 1998
- Agrilus bokori Gebhardt, 1925
- Agrilus bolamanus Kerremans, 1906
- Agrilus bolivari Obenberger, 1921
- Agrilus boliviensis Fisher, 1925
- Agrilus bonadonai Descarpentries & Villiers, 1963
- Agrilus bonariensis Kerremans, 1903
- Agrilus bondroiti Obenberger, 1933
- Agrilus boninensis Kurosawa, 1963
- Agrilus bonnotei Bourgoin, 1925
- Agrilus bonsae Descarpentries & Villiers, 1963
- Agrilus bonvouloirii Murray, 1868
- Agrilus bordoni Curletti, 2018
- Agrilus bordoniellus Curletti, 2020
- Agrilus borobudur Jendek, 2021
- Agrilus bothrops Curletti, 2005
- Agrilus boto Curletti & Pineda, 2022
- Agrilus botswanus Curletti, 2000
- Agrilus boudieri Obenberger, 1933
- Agrilus bourgognei Descarpentries & Villiers, 1963
- Agrilus bourgoini Obenberger, 1935
- Agrilus bozzallai Curletti, 2003
- Agrilus braconicoloratus Hespenheide, 1990
- Agrilus braconoides Hespenheide, 2010
- Agrilus bradti Cazier, 1951
- Agrilus braemi Obenberger,
- Agrilus brahma Obenberger, 1916
- Agrilus brancsiki Nonfried, 1895
- Agrilus brasilius Bellamy, 1998
- Agrilus brattaini Curletti & Brûlé, 2014
- Agrilus braunsi Obenberger, 1931
- Agrilus brechteli Curletti & van Harten, 2004
- Agrilus bremus Obenberger, 1935
- Agrilus breuningi Descarpentries & Villiers, 1963
- Agrilus brevicollis Kerremans, 1894
- Agrilus brevicornis Guérin-Méneville, 1840
- Agrilus brevinotus Jendek, 2011
- Agrilus brevipes Jendek, 2021
- Agrilus brevis Carter, 1924
- Agrilus brevitarsis Lewis, 1893
- Agrilus brigitteae Baudon, 1968
- Agrilus bronzeellus Thomson, 1879
- Agrilus bruchi Kerremans, 1903
- Agrilus bruchianus Obenberger, 1933
- Agrilus brunnipennis Chevrolat, 1838
- Agrilus bruschii Curletti, 1998
- Agrilus brydli Obenberger, 1924
- Agrilus buambanus Obenberger, 1931
- Agrilus buani Curletti & Vayssières, 2007
- Agrilus bucephalus Daniel, 1903
- Agrilus bucolicus Kerremans, 1894
- Agrilus buenavistae Obenberger, 1933
- Agrilus buffoni Obenberger, 1933
- Agrilus bulawayanus Obenberger, 1935
- Agrilus bumbulinus Obenberger, 1931
- Agrilus bunsu Jendek, 2015
- Agrilus buraicus Obenberger, 1928
- Agrilus buresi Obenberger, 1935
- Agrilus burgeoni Obenberger, 1935
- Agrilus burkei Fisher, 1917
- Agrilus buruanus Obenberger, 1932
- Agrilus buscki Fisher, 1938
- Agrilus businskorum Jendek, 2011
- Agrilus butuanensis Fisher, 1921
- Agrilus buyssoni Obenberger, 1933
- Agrilus cabellanus Kerremans, 1896
- Agrilus cacuminatus Curletti & Brûlé, 2015
- Agrilus cadoli Baudon, 1968
- Agrilus caducus Curletti, 2000
- Agrilus caecus Jendek, 2021
- Agrilus caepa Curletti & Dutto, 1999
- Agrilus caesalpiniae Hespenheide, 1990
- Agrilus caesareus Obenberger, 1935
- Agrilus caesius Curletti, 2018
- Agrilus cailloli Obenberger, 1935
- Agrilus calibai Jendek, 2018
- Agrilus calcar Curletti, 2009
- Agrilus calcarifer Jendek, 2013
- Agrilus caligans Bourgoin, 1925
- Agrilus callani Fisher, 1943
- Agrilus calligatus Obenberger, 1931
- Agrilus calliginulus Obenberger, 1935
- Agrilus calvoventre Curletti & Brûlé, 2013
- Agrilus calvulus Obenberger, 1935
- Agrilus camaxtlei Fisher, 1938
- Agrilus cameroni Bellamy, 1999
- Agrilus cameronius Jendek & Nakládal, 2019
- Agrilus cameroonensis Obenberger, 1931
- Agrilus camerunicus Kerremans, 1899
- Agrilus caminosus Obenberger, 1933
- Agrilus campana Jendek & Nakládal, 2018
- Agrilus campesinus Curletti, 2019
- Agrilus campestris Deyrolle, 1864
- Agrilus camsingi Baudon, 1968
- Agrilus camusi Curletti & Brûlé, 2011
- Agrilus canaliculatus Kerremans, 1898
- Agrilus candidiventris Obenberger, 1936
- Agrilus canelonius Obenberger, 1933
- Agrilus canepani Curletti, 2018
- Agrilus canidius Descarpentries & Villiers, 1963
- Agrilus cannulus Obenberger, 1924
- Agrilus canus Kerremans, 1912
- Agrilus caobang Jendek, 2021,
- Agrilus capicolus Kerremans, 1898
- Agrilus capillitectus Obenberger, 1933
- Agrilus capitatus Deyrolle, 1864
- Agrilus capricornus Jendek, 2013
- Agrilus captivus Fisher, 1944
- Agrilus capucinus Curletti & Brûlé, 2014
- Agrilus caquetai Curletti & Angelo, 2017
- Agrilus caracanus Obenberger, 1933
- Agrilus carbo Obenberger, 1923
- Agrilus carbonarius Deyrolle, 1864
- Agrilus cardaces Obenberger, 1936
- Agrilus cardiaspis Kerremans, 1897
- Agrilus cardoni Théry, 1930
- Agrilus carettei Baudon, 1968
- Agrilus carilloensis Fisher, 1938
- Agrilus carinellifer Obenberger, 1924
- Agrilus carinellus Thomson, 1879
- Agrilus carinelytratus Jendek in Jendek & Grebennikov, 2009
- Agrilus carinihumeralis Kurosawa, 1964
- Agrilus carinipennis Obenberger, 1924
- Agrilus carinus Obenberger, 1932
- Agrilus cariosulus Obenberger, 1935
- Agrilus cariosus Kerremans, 1899
- Agrilus carissimus (Waterhouse, 1889)
- Agrilus carli Curletti, 2017
- Agrilus carmineus Dugès, 1891
- Agrilus caroli Kerremans, 1903
- Agrilus carolinae Curletti, 2002
- Agrilus carpini Knull, 1923
- Agrilus carterellus Obenberger, 1959
- Agrilus cartesias Obenberger, 1933
- Agrilus cartistus Obenberger, 1932
- Agrilus carystus Obenberger, 1935
- Agrilus casalei Curletti, 1997
- Agrilus casarii Curletti & Migliore, 2014
- Agrilus cascelius Obenberger, 1935
- Agrilus casignetus Obenberger, 1932
- Agrilus castus Descarpentries & Villiers, 1963
- Agrilus catalinae Knull, 1940
- Agrilus catamarcanus Obenberger, 1916
- Agrilus catherinae (Chevrolat, 1835)
- Agrilus caucasicola Semenov, 1891
- Agrilus caudalis Gory & Laporte, 1837
- Agrilus caudatus Mannerheim, 1837
- Agrilus caudicula Jendek, 2011
- Agrilus caurus Curletti, 2020
- Agrilus causalis Obenberger, 1935
- Agrilus caussei Curletti, 2000
- Agrilus cavatus Chevrolat, 1838
- Agrilus cavazzutii Curletti, 2006
- Agrilus cavei Hespenheide, 2012
- Agrilus caviceps Kerremans, 1900
- Agrilus cavifrons Waterhouse, 1889
- Agrilus cavinas Fisher, 1925
- Agrilus caxaxtlei Fisher, 1938
- Agrilus cechovskyi Jendek, 2015
- Agrilus celebicola Obenberger, 1924
- Agrilus celebiensis Deyrolle, 1864
- Agrilus celerae Descarpentries & Villiers, 1963
- Agrilus celsus Kerremans, 1897
- Agrilus celti Knull, 1920
- Agrilus centralis Waterhouse, 1889
- Agrilus centunculus Curletti, 2005
- Agrilus centurial Jendek, 2001
- Agrilus cephalicus LeConte, 1860
- Agrilus cephalotes Waterhouse, 1889
- Agrilus cercidii Knull, 1937
- Agrilus cerdai Curletti & Brûlé, 2011
- Agrilus cerinoguttatus Chevrolat, 1835
- Agrilus cernosvitovi Obenberger, 1935
- Agrilus cernus Obenberger, 1931
- Agrilus cerrolatus Curletti, 2010
- Agrilus cerroltaus Curletti, 2011
- Agrilus certus Descarpentries & Villiers, 1963
- Agrilus ceruleodepilis Thomson, 1879
- Agrilus cervicatus Descarpentries & Villiers, 1963
- Agrilus cervus Curletti, 2006
- Agrilus ceylonensis Obenberger, 1916
- Agrilus chacoensis Obenberger, 1935
- Agrilus chaetifer Jendek, 2021
- Agrilus chaetocoxalis Jendek, 2011
- Agrilus chalcoderes Chevrolat, 1835
- Agrilus chalcoventris Gory, 1841
- Agrilus chamelae Hespenheide, 1990
- Agrilus chameleon Curletti, 2002
- Agrilus champasak Jendek, 2000
- Agrilus champlaini Frost, 1912
- Agrilus chapaensis Descarpentries & Villiers, 1967
- Agrilus chaparensis Pochon, 1971
- Agrilus charaxes Obenberger, 1939
- Agrilus charismaticus Jendek, 2000
- Agrilus chekiangensis Gebhardt, 1928
- Agrilus chembae Théry, 1934
- Agrilus chen Curletti & Ong, 2022
- Agrilus chevreuli Obenberger, 1933
- Agrilus chevrolati Waterhouse, 1889
- Agrilus chiachingae Curletti & Ong, 2023
- Agrilus chiangdaoensis Jendek, 1994
- Agrilus chiarae Curletti, 2019
- Agrilus chicomecoatlae Fisher, 1938
- Agrilus chihuahuae Cazier, 1951
- Agrilus chionochaetus Obenberger, 1913
- Agrilus chionostictus Hołyński, 2020
- Agrilus chiricahuae Fisher, 1928
- Agrilus chirindanus Obenberger, 1935
- Agrilus chiromoensis Obenberger, 1935
- Agrilus chloris Curletti & Goergen, 2011
- Agrilus chlorocephalus Waterhouse, 1889
- Agrilus chlorochrous Obenberger, 1935
- Agrilus chlorophyllus Abeille de Perrin, 1904
- Agrilus chloros Jendek, 2017
- Agrilus chlorus Dugès, 1891
- Agrilus chobauti Abeille de Perrin, 1897
- Agrilus chola Jendek, 2021
- Agrilus chopardi Descarpentries & Villiers, 1963
- Agrilus chounramanyi Baudon, 1965
- Agrilus chowni Curletti, 2000
- Agrilus chromaticus Jendek, 2021
- Agrilus chrysicollis Deyrolle, 1864
- Agrilus chrysipleuris Obenberger, 1931
- Agrilus chrysobothroides Hespenheide in Hespenheide & Bellamy, 2009
- Agrilus chrysochloris Deyrolle, 1864
- Agrilus chrysochrous Obenberger, 1935
- Agrilus chrysophanus Gory, 1841
- Agrilus chrysostictoides Obenberger, 1935
- Agrilus chrysostictus (Klug, 1825)
- Agrilus chujoi Kurosawa, 1985
- Agrilus chutiya Hołyński, 2018
- Agrilus cibarius Fisher, 1944
- Agrilus cicadelloides Jendek & Grebennikov, 2019
- Agrilus ciliatipes Deyrolle, 1864
- Agrilus cimmerius Curletti & Brûlé, 2015
- Agrilus cinctus (Olivier, 1790)
- Agrilus cingulatus Kerremans, 1897
- Agrilus ciping Jendek, 2011
- Agrilus ciradi Curletti, 2002
- Agrilus circumflutus Obenberger, 1947
- Agrilus circus Obenberger, 1932
- Agrilus cisses Obenberger, 1932
- Agrilus citri Hołyński, 2019
- Agrilus citrinolatus Thomson, 1879
- Agrilus civacoatlae Fisher, 1938
- Agrilus civapipiltiae Fisher, 1938
- Agrilus cizeki Curletti, 2005
- Agrilus clabaudi Baudon, 1965
- Agrilus cladrastis Knull, 1945
- Agrilus clairvillei Obenberger, 1933
- Agrilus clangedon Obenberger, 1933
- Agrilus clarior Hołyński, 2018
- Agrilus claudioi Curletti & Ong, 2023
- Agrilus claudulus Obenberger, 1935
- Agrilus clausus Kerremans, 1897
- Agrilus clavaraui Obenberger, 1933
- Agrilus clavatus Kerremans, 1899
- Agrilus claveri Kerremans, 1900
- Agrilus claviger Obenberger, 1935
- Agrilus clavulatus Curletti & Ong, 2022
- Agrilus clazon Obenberger, 1933
- Agrilus cleidecostae Curletti, 2020
- Agrilus cliftoni Knull, 1941
- Agrilus clown Curletti, Ribeiro & Migliore, 2016
- Agrilus clytrinoides Bellamy & Hespenheide, 2002
- Agrilus coal Curletti, Ribeiro & Migliore, 2013
- Agrilus coatlycuei Fisher, 1938
- Agrilus cobosinus Curletti, 1995
- Agrilus cochinchinae Obenberger, 1924
- Agrilus cochisei Knull, 1948
- Agrilus cockatoo Curletti, 2001
- Agrilus coco Jendek & Nakládal, 2019
- Agrilus coelestis Deyrolle, 1864
- Agrilus coeruleicollis Saunders, 1866
- Agrilus coeruleonigra Fisher, 1929
- Agrilus colasi Descarpentries & Villiers, 1963
- Agrilus collaris (Waterhouse, 1889)
- Agrilus collartianus Descarpentries & Villiers, 1963
- Agrilus colleti Curletti & Brûlé, 2011
- Agrilus colligatus Obenberger, 1931
- Agrilus collignoni Curletti, 2000
- Agrilus collinus Jendek, 2021
- Agrilus collis Curletti & Brûlé, 2013
- Agrilus colluviellus Thomson, 1879
- Agrilus colombianus Gory, 1841
- Agrilus colonicus Curletti, 2005
- Agrilus coloradoensis Hespenheidei, 2012
- Agrilus coloratus Kerremans, 1894
- Agrilus comes Kerremans, 1896
- Agrilus comitulus Obenberger, 1935
- Agrilus comizon Obenberger, 1935
- Agrilus compacticornis Jendek, 2011
- Agrilus compitalis Obenberger, 1936
- Agrilus complexus (Waterhouse, 1889)
- Agrilus compressus Kerremans, 1899
- Agrilus comptus Kerremans, 1900
- Agrilus comstocki Obenberger, 1933
- Agrilus concameratus Jendek, 2021
- Agrilus concavus Deyrolle, 1864
- Agrilus concinnus Horn, 1891
- Agrilus concors Obenberger, 1935
- Agrilus concupiens Obenberger, 1935
- Agrilus confinis Faldermann, 1835
- Agrilus conformis Gory, 1841
- Agrilus confossicollis Kerremans, 1892
- Agrilus confusus Waterhouse, 1889
- Agrilus confutus Obenberger, 1936
- Agrilus congener Kerremans, 1896
- Agrilus conicus Gory, 1841
- Agrilus coniectum Curletti, 2020
- Agrilus conissalus Obenberger, 1935
- Agrilus connatus Jendek & Nakládal, 2019
- Agrilus connexus Kerremans, 1900
- Agrilus connicki Baudon, 1968
- Agrilus conradsi Obenberger, 1940
- Agrilus conradti Obenberger, 1935
- Agrilus consentaneus Kerremans, 1897
- Agrilus conspersus Jendek, 2011
- Agrilus consuetus Curletti & Brûlé, 2015
- Agrilus consimilis Waterhouse, 1889
- Agrilus constantini Obenberger, 1927
- Agrilus consularis Kerremans, 1897
- Agrilus consumptoris Fisher, 1944
- Agrilus continuatus Waterhouse, 1909
- Agrilus contarinii Curletti, 2021
- Agrilus contractus Fisher, 1930
- Agrilus contristatus Obenberger, 1935
- Agrilus contrucidatus Obenberger, 1935
- Agrilus convergens Fisher, 1930
- Agrilus convexicollis Redtenbacher, 1849
- Agrilus convexifrons Kiesenwetter, 1857
- Agrilus convexiusculus Kerremans, 1912
- Agrilus convexivertex Curletti & Ong, 2022
- Agrilus convexus Kerremans, 1900
- Agrilus convictor Descarpentries & Villiers, 1963
- Agrilus conviva Obenberger, 1933
- Agrilus coolsi Curletti, 1997
- Agrilus coomani Bourgoin, 1925
- Agrilus copraeus Obenberger, 1932
- Agrilus coracicolor Obenberger, 1931
- Agrilus coraebiformis Kerremans, 1908
- Agrilus coraeboides Kerremans, 1900
- Agrilus corallinus Curletti, 2006
- Agrilus cordicollis Jendek, 2011
- Agrilus cordillerae Kirsch, 1873
- Agrilus cordovanus Obenberger, 1933
- Agrilus coreanus Obenberger, 1935
- Agrilus cornutus Kerremans, 1898
- Agrilus coronatus Curletti & Pineda, 2022
- Agrilus correctus Thomson, 1878
- Agrilus corrugatus (Waterhouse, 1889)
- Agrilus corylicola Fisher, 1928
- Agrilus corysson Obenberger, 1933
- Agrilus costalis Jendek, 2021
- Agrilus costatus Curletti & Brûlé, 2014
- Agrilus costifer Kerremans, 1903
- Agrilus costipennis Kerremans, 1899
- Agrilus costulatus Harold, 1878
- Agrilus coxalis Waterhouse, 1889 —
- Agrilus coyaudi Curletti, 2009
- Agrilus crapulellus Thomson, 1879
- Agrilus crapulosus Curletti, 2022
- Agrilus crassus (Théry, 1905)
- Agrilus crataegi Frost, 1912
- Agrilus credulus Kerremans, 1897
- Agrilus crepuscularis Jendek & Chamorro, 2012
- Agrilus cribricollis Waterhouse, 1889
- Agrilus criddlei Frost, 1920
- Agrilus crinicornis Horn, 1891
- Agrilus cristianoi Curletti & Vayssières, 2007
- Agrilus croceivestis Marseul, 1866
- Agrilus croceovittatus Waterhouse, 1889
- Agrilus cruciatus Kerremans, 1912
- Agrilus crucifer Curletti, 2020
- Agrilus crucifrons Kerremans, 1912
- Agrilus crussesetosus Curletti & Ong, 2023
- Agrilus crux Curletti & Migliore, 2014
- Agrilus crypticus Jendek, 2021
- Agrilus ctenias Théry, 1934
- Agrilus cteniasiformis Curletti & Sakalian, 2009
- Agrilus ctenocerus Gory, 1841
- Agrilus ctesias Kerremans, 1913
- Agrilus cucullus Obenberger, 1935
- Agrilus cuneatus Jendek in Jendek & Grebennikov, 2009
- Agrilus cuneiformis Deyrolle, 1864
- Agrilus cultus Jendek, 2018
- Agrilus cupai Gory, 1841
- Agrilus cupes Lewis, 1893
- Agrilus cupido Obenberger, 1924
- Agrilus cupidus Kerremans, 1897
- Agrilus cupratus Kerremans, 1900
- Agrilus cupreiceps Walker, 1859
- Agrilus cupreonitens Fisher, 1928
- Agrilus cupreoviolaceus Deyrolle, 1864
- Agrilus cuprescens (Ménétriés, 1832)
- Agrilus cuprescensellus Thomson, 1879
- Agrilus cupricauda Saunders, 1867
- Agrilus cuprifrons Deyrolle, 1864
- Agrilus cupripes Deyrolle, 1864
- Agrilus cupriventris Gory & Laporte, 1837
- Agrilus cuprocunctus Jendek & Grebennikov, 2018
- Agrilus cuprosus Obenberger, 1923
- Agrilus curator Kerremans, 1903
- Agrilus curiousus Jendek, 2015
- Agrilus curtulus Mulsant & Rey, 1863
- Agrilus curtus Fisher, 1930
- Agrilus curvicollis Moore, 1986
- Agrilus curvus Kerremans, 1899
- Agrilus cuspidatus Fåhraeus in Boheman, 1851
- Agrilus cuspilobus Jendek, 2021
- Agrilus cuvieri Obenberger, 1933
- Agrilus cylinder Jendek, 2021
- Agrilus cyaneofasciatus Théry, 1930
- Agrilus cyaneomicans Nonfried, 1892
- Agrilus cyaneoniger Saunders, 1873
- Agrilus cyaneovirens Bourgoin, 1922
- Agrilus cyanescens (Ratzeburg, 1837)
- Agrilus cyanicollis Deyrolle, 1864
- Agrilus cyanipennis Gory & Laporte, 1837
- Agrilus cyanopterus (Fabricius, 1801)
- Agrilus cygneus Abeille de Perrin, 1903
- Agrilus cylindratus Kerremans, 1896
- Agrilus cyphothoracoides Hespenheide in Westcott, et al., 2008
- Agrilus cypselus Curletti, 2006
- Agrilus cytisi Baudi di Selve, 1870
- Agrilus daccordii Curletti, 1997
- Agrilus daghestanicus Obenberger, 1930
- Agrilus dahanshan Curletti & Ong, 2022
- Agrilus dahoi Baudon, 1965
- Agrilus dahomeicus Kerremans, 1903
- Agrilus daillieri Baudon, 1965
- Agrilus daimio Obenberger, 1936
- Agrilus dalensi Curletti & Brûlé, 2011
- Agrilus dali Jendek in Jendek & Grebennikov, 2009
- Agrilus dama Curletti, 2006
- Agrilus damoiselli Baudon, 1968
- Agrilus dampfi Fisher, 1933
- Agrilus danesi Obenberger, 1923
- Agrilus danglesae Baudon, 1968
- Agrilus dapan Curletti & Ong, 2022
- Agrilus dapitanensis Fisher, 1921
- Agrilus darevskii Jendek, 2021
- Agrilus darjiling Jendek, 2001
- Agrilus dastaracae Descarpentries & Villiers, 1963
- Agrilus daubentoni Obenberger, 1933
- Agrilus dauberi Curletti, 2010
- Agrilus daur Jendek, 2011
- Agrilus davidsoni Curletti, 1995
- Agrilus davisi Knull, 1941
- Agrilus deauratus Macleay, 1872
- Agrilus debakkeri Curletti, 2009
- Agrilus debilis Fåhraeus in Boheman, 1851
- Agrilus deborrei Dugès, 1891
- Agrilus decandolli Obenberger, 1933
- Agrilus decarinatus Curletti & Brûlé, 2013
- Agrilus decellei Pochon, 1972
- Agrilus decemnotatus Chevrolat, 1838
- Agrilus deceptor Kerremans, 1897
- Agrilus deceptorosus Obenberger, 1933
- Agrilus decimatus Obenberger, 1935
- Agrilus decoloratulus Obenberger, 1935
- Agrilus decoloratus Kerremans, 1892
- Agrilus decoratus Péringuey, 1908
- Agrilus decorsei (Théry, 1905)
- Agrilus decorus Kerremans, 1897
- Agrilus decupratus Curletti, 2001
- Agrilus defectus LeConte, 1860
- Agrilus deguchii Tôyama, 1985
- Agrilus dejeanii Thomson, 1879
- Agrilus delagoanus Obenberger, 1931
- Agrilus delchevi Curletti & Sakalian, 2009
- Agrilus delectabilis Waterhouse, 1889
- Agrilus delenitor Obenberger, 1935
- Agrilus deletus Kerremans, 1896
- Agrilus delicatulus Waterhouse, 1889
- Agrilus deliciosus Kerremans, 1897
- Agrilus delmastrellus Curletti & Vayssières, 2007
- Agrilus delmastroi Curletti, 2002
- Agrilus delphinensis Abeille de Perrin, 1897
- Agrilus delphinus Curletti, 2002
- Agrilus delphius Obenberger, 1924
- Agrilus delsinnei Curletti, 2015
- Agrilus demetrius Obenberger, 1924
- Agrilus demissus Kerremans, 1894
- Agrilus densetomentosus Obenberger, 1940
- Agrilus denticornis Chevrolat, 1867
- Agrilus denticulatus Waterhouse, 1889
- Agrilus dentifer Waterhouse, 1889
- Agrilus dentipennis Kerremans, 1899
- Agrilus dentipes Deyrolle, 1864
- Agrilus depilatus Curletti & Brûlé, 2011
- Agrilus depressifrons Kerremans, 1900
- Agrilus depressus Kerremans, 1899
- Agrilus derasofasciatus Lacordaire in Boisduval & Lacordaire, 1835
- Agrilus derrisi Théry, 1930
- Agrilus desaegeri Curletti, 1997
- Agrilus desbosi Descarpentries & Villiers, 1963
- Agrilus descampsi Descarpentries & Villiers, 1963
- Agrilus descarpentriesi Bellamy, 1998
- Agrilus desertus (Klug, 1829)
- Agrilus desfontainesi Obenberger, 1933
- Agrilus desideratus Kerremans, 1897
- Agrilus desmaresti Obenberger, 1932
- Agrilus desuetus Kerremans, 1912
- Agrilus detractus Waterhouse, 1889
- Agrilus deuvei Baudon, 1965
- Agrilus devulsus Obenberger, 1935
- Agrilus dewetti Obenberger, 1933
- Agrilus dewynteri Curletti & Brûlé, 2015
- Agrilus deyrollei Kerremans, 1892
- Agrilus dhotmanae Curletti, 2000
- Agrilus diadema Deyrolle, 1864
- Agrilus diagoros Obenberger, 1933
- Agrilus diaguita Moore, 1985
- Agrilus dianthus Kerremans, 1892
- Agrilus diao Jendek, 2011
- Agrilus diaolin Jendek, 2001
- Agrilus diaphanes Obenberger, 1932
- Agrilus dicalis Kerremans, 1903
- Agrilus dicax Kerremans, 1897
- Agrilus dichrous Kerremans, 1897
- Agrilus dietzi Fisher, 1938
- Agrilus differens Kerremans, 1896
- Agrilus difficilis Gory, 1841
- Agrilus dignus Kerremans, 1912
- Agrilus dilatefasciatus Obenberger, 1935
- Agrilus dilaticornis Kerremans, 1897
- Agrilus dilatipenis Jendek in Jendek & Grebennikov, 2009
- Agrilus dilatometatibialis Jendek, 1994
- Agrilus diligens Kerremans, 1912
- Agrilus dilleri Curletti, 2020
- Agrilus dimidiatus Waterhouse, 1889
- Agrilus dimorphus Obenberger, 1923
- Agrilus dingo Curletti, 2001
- Agrilus dingoides Curletti & Aberlanc, 2010
- Agrilus diolaus Obenberger, 1958
- Agrilus dionides Thomson, 1879
- Agrilus dioptasius Curletti & Ong, 2022
- Agrilus dioscorides Obenberger, 1935
- Agrilus diospyroides Knull, 1942
- Agrilus dipterioides Hespenheidei, 2012
- Agrilus diromai Curletti & Brûlé, 2011
- Agrilus dirus Kerremans, 1897
- Agrilus dis Curletti, 2012
- Agrilus discalis Saunders, 1873
- Agrilus discicolliformis Obenberger, 1936
- Agrilus discicollis Deyrolle, 1864
- Agrilus discoidalis Waterhouse, 1889
- Agrilus discolor Fåhraeus in Boheman, 1851
- Agrilus discoloriformis Obenberger, 1920
- Agrilus discretus Théry, 1947
- Agrilus disorientatus Curletti, Ribeiro & Migliore, 2013
- Agrilus dispar Théry, 1947
- Agrilus disparifrons Curletti, 2010
- Agrilus dispersus Curletti, 2002
- Agrilus disponsae Baudon, 1968
- Agrilus dissimilis Waterhouse, 1889
- Agrilus distans Waterhouse, 1889
- Agrilus distinctus Deyrolle, 1864
- Agrilus divaricatus Waterhouse, 1889
- Agrilus divergens Thomson, 1878
- Agrilus diversicolor (Wallengren, 1881)
- Agrilus diversifrons Kerremans, 1899
- Agrilus diversornatus Jendek, 2011
- Agrilus diversus Waterhouse, 1889
- Agrilus dives Kerremans, 1897
- Agrilus divinus Jendek, 2021
- Agrilus divulginatus Jendek, 2021
- Agrilus docilis Kerremans, 1897
- Agrilus doddi Carter, 1924
- Agrilus dodola Jendek, 2021
- Agrilus dohrni Kerremans, 1900
- Agrilus dohrnianus Obenberger, 1933
- Agrilus doipui Jendek, 2007
- Agrilus dolatus Kerremans, 1897
- Agrilus dollii Schaeffer, 1904
- Agrilus dollmanni Obenberger, 1931
- Agrilus dolorosus Théry, 1947
- Agrilus dominicanus Thomson, 1878
- Agrilus dondeanus Obenberger, 1935
- Agrilus dorbignyi Saunders, 1871
- Agrilus dorsalis Deyrolle, 1864
- Agrilus dotatus Curletti, 2009
- Agrilus douglasi Obenberger, 1959
- Agrilus dozieri Fisher, 1918
- Agrilus draco Jendek & Grebennikov, 2019
- Agrilus drescheri Fisher, 1935
- Agrilus dromas Curletti, 1997
- Agrilus drumonti Curletti & Vayssières, 2007
- Agrilus drumontianus Hołyński, 2018
- Agrilus dryadis Obenberger, 1932
- Agrilus dualae Obenberger, 1923
- Agrilus dualis Kerremans, 1903
- Agrilus dubiosus Curletti & Migliore, 2014
- Agrilus dubius Kerremans, 1897
- Agrilus duckei Curletti, 2019
- Agrilus dubouai Descarpentries & Villiers, 1963
- Agrilus dudai Obenberger, 1932
- Agrilus duffelsorum Jendek, 2017
- Agrilus dugesi Kerremans, 1897
- Agrilus dukuduku Curletti, 2004
- Agrilus dulishan Curletti & Ong, 2023
- Agrilus duncani Knull, 1929
- Agrilus dunoyeri Baudon, 1968
- Agrilus duplicatus Kerremans, 1896
- Agrilus duporti Bourgoin, 1922
- Agrilus durantoni Curletti & Brûlé, 2011
- Agrilus dureli Jendek, 2011
- Agrilus duttoi Curletti, 1997
- Agrilus duvivieri Kerremans, 1898
- Agrilus dwarf Jendek, 2021
- Agrilus dysauxes Obenberger, 1933
- Agrilus ebenus Jendek & Grebennikov, 2018
- Agrilus ebersolti Curletti, 2000
- Agrilus ebolowae Obenberger, 1931
- Agrilus eburneopilosus Curletti, 2003
- Agrilus eburneus Curletti & Brûlé, 2013
- Agrilus ecalcaratus Jendek, 2017
- Agrilus ecarinatus Marseul, 1866
- Agrilus echidna Curletti, 2001
- Agrilus echthreuon Obenberger, 1935
- Agrilus edeanus Obenberger, 1935
- Agrilus egeniformis Champlain & Knull, 1923
- Agrilus egenus Gory, 1841
- Agrilus eichelbaumi Kerremans, 1913
- Agrilus ekonae Obenberger, 1923
- Agrilus elaphrus Obenberger, 1933
- Agrilus eleanorae Fisher, 1928
- Agrilus electus Kerremans, 1897
- Agrilus elegans Mulsant & Rey, 1863
- Agrilus elegantulus (Waterhouse, 1889)
- Agrilus elenchon Obenberger, 1935
- Agrilus elfus Curletti & Brûlé, 2017
- Agrilus elimatus Obenberger, 1935
- Agrilus elisus Jendek, 2021
- Agrilus elongatissimus Kurosawa, 1981
- Agrilus elongatulus Gory & Laporte, 1837
- Agrilus emarginatus (Waterhouse, 1889)
- Agrilus embrikstrandellus Obenberger, 1935
- Agrilus emendatus Descarpentries & Villiers, 1963
- Agrilus emeritus Descarpentries & Villiers, 1963
- Agrilus eminens Descarpentries & Villiers, 1963
- Agrilus emmerichi Obenberger, 1935
- Agrilus empedus Obenberger, 1933
- Agrilus empictus Curletti & Brûlé, 2017
- Agrilus emsignatus Curletti & Brûlé, 2017
- Agrilus emu Curletti, 2001
- Agrilus encaustus Obenberger, 1924
- Agrilus endroedyi Curletti, 2000
- Agrilus enervatus Thomson, 1879
- Agrilus enriguei Murria Beltrán & Murria Beltrán, 2007
- Agrilus entomogastrinus Obenberger, 1935
- Agrilus epaulus Obenberger, 1932
- Agrilus ephialtes Obenberger, 1931
- Agrilus episcopalis Curletti, 2020
- Agrilus episcopus Curletti, 2003
- Agrilus epularis Obenberger, 1935
- Agrilus erbeni Obenberger, 1933
- Agrilus erbeniellus Obenberger, 1935
- Agrilus erici Curletti, 2010
- Agrilus erraticus Kerremans, 1900
- Agrilus ertli Kerremans, 1907
- Agrilus erubescens Curletti, 2018
- Agrilus erythrostictus Bourgoin, 1922
- Agrilus esakii Kurosawa, 1964
- Agrilus esasignatus Curletti & Brûlé, 2016
- Agrilus escaleri Obenberger, 1921
- Agrilus escambroni F. Murria Beltrán, Tolosa Sánchez & Á. Murria Beltrán, 2022
- Agrilus esculentus Fisher, 1944
- Agrilus esmeraldasinus Curletti, 2022
- Agrilus esperanzae Knull, 1935
- Agrilus ethlius Gory, 1841
- Agrilus etruscus Curletti, 2013
- Agrilus eucerus Obenberger, 1935
- Agrilus eudaemon Obenberger, 1933
- Agrilus euglenes Obenberger, 1931
- Agrilus eukamosinus Obenberger, 1935
- Agrilus eulaxus Obenberger, 1932
- Agrilus eunuchus Jendek, 2011
- Agrilus euonymi Tôyama, 1985
- Agrilus eupalamus Gory, 1841
- Agrilus eupractus Obenberger, 1931
- Agrilus eurysaces Obenberger, 1947
- Agrilus eusternus Obenberger, 1935
- Agrilus eutyches Obenberger, 1932
- Agrilus evansiae Obenberger, 1933
- Agrilus evansianus Théry, 1934
- Agrilus evelinae Holynski, 1998
- Agrilus eversor Kerremans, 1903
- Agrilus evinadus Gory & Laporte, 1837
- Agrilus evocatus Curletti, 2021
- Agrilus evolutus Descarpentries & Villiers, 1963
- Agrilus exageratus Obenberger, 1933
- Agrilus excelsus Curletti & Brûlé, 2015
- Agrilus excisus Waterhouse, 1889
- Agrilus exclusus Obenberger, 1924
- Agrilus exiguellus Fisher, 1928
- Agrilus exilipennis Jendek, 2021
- Agrilus exilistis Strand, 1917
- Agrilus eximius Kerremans, 1897
- Agrilus exoletus Obenberger, 1935
- Agrilus exornatus Curletti & Brûlé, 2023
- Agrilus expletus Kerremans, 1897
- Agrilus exophthalmus Curletti & Ong, 2022
- Agrilus expolitus Kerremans, 1897
- Agrilus exquisitus Hespenheide, 2012
- Agrilus exsapindi Vogt, 1949
- Agrilus extraneus Fisher, 1933
- Agrilus extrarmatus Curletti, 2003
- Agrilus exustus Waterhouse, 1889
- Agrilus eyai Westcott & Noguera, 1995
- Agrilus faber Kerremans, 1897
- Agrilus fabricii Obenberger, 1933
- Agrilus facetus Curletti, 2018
- Agrilus faciatus Kerremans, 1903
- Agrilus faganae Curletti, 2005
- Agrilus fagniezi Obenberger, 1931
- Agrilus fahraei Saunders, 1871
- Agrilus fairmairei Kerremans, 1892
- Agrilus falaizei Baudon, 1968
- Agrilus falcatus (Klug, 1835)
- Agrilus falsus Curletti & Brûlé, 2013
- Agrilus fallaciosulus Obenberger, 1935
- Agrilus fallax Say, 1833
- Agrilus falli Fisher, 1928
- Agrilus fanericus Curletti & Brûlé, 2013
- Agrilus famulus Kerremans, 1900
- Agrilus fareastensis Jendek, 1995
- Agrilus fariniplagis Hołyński, 2018
- Agrilus farinosus (Théry, 1905)
- Agrilus fartus Obenberger, 1935
- Agrilus fasattii Obenberger, 1959
- Agrilus fasciatellus Thomson, 1878
- Agrilus fasciatus Jendek, 2013
- Agrilus fasciohirtus Obenberger, 1935
- Agrilus fasciolatus Chevrolat, 1838
- Agrilus fasciosus Obenberger, 1935
- Agrilus fassatii Obenberger, 1959
- Agrilus fastidiosus Kerremans, 1896
- Agrilus fastigatus Kerremans, 1897
- Agrilus faurei Curletti & Brûlé, 2011
- Agrilus fauveli Kerremans, 1898
- Agrilus favieri Baudon, 1961
- Agrilus feae Kerremans, 1906
- Agrilus febriculosus Curletti, 2018
- Agrilus fei Curletti & Brûlé, 2017
- Agrilus felix Horn, 1891
- Agrilus femina Curletti & Migliore, 2014
- Agrilus femoralis Waterhouse, 1889
- Agrilus fenestratus Curletti, 2003
- Agrilus fernandezi Curletti & Brûlé, 2013
- Agrilus ferrisi Dury, 1908
- Agrilus fertoni Obenberger, 1933
- Agrilus fevreae Descarpentries & Villiers, 1963
- Agrilus fidelis Kerremans, 1896
- Agrilus fidelissimus Obenberger, 1923
- Agrilus fidens Kerremans, 1903
- Agrilus figuratus Curletti & Brûlé, 2011
- Agrilus filiformis Gory & Laporte, 1837
- Agrilus filigranus Obenberger, 1916
- Agrilus filiolus Obenberger, 1933
- Agrilus filius Bílý, Curletti & Van Harten, 2003
- Agrilus filonius Obenberger, 1933
- Agrilus filosellus Thomson, 1879
- Agrilus finellei Curletti & Vayssières, 2007
- Agrilus firmianae Curletti & Ong, 2022
- Agrilus fisherellus Obenberger, 1936
- Agrilus fisherianus Knull, 1930
- Agrilus fissifrons Fairmaire, 1849
- Agrilus fissus Obenberger, 1917
- Agrilus flacourti (Théry, 1905)
- Agrilus flaveolus Gory & Laporte, 1837
- Agrilus flavoguttatus Waterhouse, 1889
- Agrilus flavus Jendek, 2021
- Agrilus flechtmanni Curletti & Migliore, 2014
- Agrilus fleischeri Obenberger, 1925
- Agrilus fleutiauxi Bourgoin, 1922
- Agrilus flohri (Waterhouse, 1890)
- Agrilus florae Curletti & Angelo, 2017
- Agrilus floreni Curletti, 2020
- Agrilus florens Curletti & Brûlé, 2021
- Agrilus florentineae Baudon, 1964
- Agrilus floridanus Crotch, 1873
- Agrilus florilegus Obenberger, 1933
- Agrilus flosculus Obenberger, 1933
- Agrilus foliatus Jendek, 2007
- Agrilus foliicornis Abeille de Perrin, 1891
- Agrilus folognei Kerremans, 1912
- Agrilus fongmuorum Curletti & Ong, 2022
- Agrilus fontanus Kerremans, 1914
- Agrilus foramenifer Curletti & Brûlé, 2014
- Agrilus forceps Curletti & Brûlé, 2014
- Agrilus forficulus Curletti & Brûlé, 2013
- Agrilus formosanus Kerremans, 1912
- Agrilus fornicatus Jendek, 2011
- Agrilus forquerayi Baudon, 1968
- Agrilus forschhammeri Curletti, 1998
- Agrilus fortunatus Lewis, 1893
- Agrilus fosseicollis Thomson, 1879
- Agrilus fossiger Waterhouse, 1889
- Agrilus fossithorax Théry, 1955
- Agrilus fossulatus Waterhouse, 1889
- Agrilus fouqueae Descarpentries & Villiers, 1963
- Agrilus fouqueti Bourgoin, 1922
- Agrilus fourgassiei Curletti & Brûlé, 2013
- Agrilus foveocephalus Jendek, 2011
- Agrilus fragilis Kerremans, 1893
- Agrilus fragmentatus Curletti & Brûlé, 2011
- Agrilus franciusi Descarpentries & Villiers, 1963
- Agrilus francotassii Curletti, 2000
- Agrilus francottei Curletti, 1997
- Agrilus frankparkeri Hespenheidei, 2012
- Agrilus fraternus Dugès, 1891
- Agrilus fraudatorellus Thomson, 1879
- Agrilus fraudulentus Péringuey, 1908
- Agrilus frenchi Blackburn, 1891
- Agrilus frequens Curletti & Dutto, 1999
- Agrilus frerensis Obenberger, 1935
- Agrilus freundi Curletti, 2012
- Agrilus friebi Obenberger, 1922
- Agrilus friesei Obenberger, 1932
- Agrilus frigidinus Obenberger, 1932
- Agrilus frigidus Gory, 1841
- Agrilus frondeus Curletti, 2019
- Agrilus frontalis Gory & Laporte, 1837
- Agrilus frontis Jendek & Grebennikov, 2018
- Agrilus frosti Knull, 1920
- Agrilus frustrator Kerremans, 1900
- Agrilus frustrinus Obenberger, 1935
- Agrilus fryi Obenberger, 1931
- Agrilus fucatus Obenberger, 1935
- Agrilus fugax Kerremans, 1894
- Agrilus fugitivus Kerremans, 1896
- Agrilus fulgens LeConte, 1860
- Agrilus fulgidiceps Motschulsky, 1861
- Agrilus fulvolineatus Kerremans, 1903
- Agrilus fulvopictus Kerremans, 1896
- Agrilus fulvovittatus Fisher, 1921
- Agrilus funebris Deyrolle, 1864
- Agrilus funestus Gory, 1841
- Agrilus furcatipennis Gory & Laporte, 1837
- Agrilus furcillatus Chevrolat, 1834
- Agrilus furiosus Obenberger, 1935
- Agrilus fusciapex Jendek, 2011
- Agrilus fuscipennis Gory, 1841
- Agrilus fuscus Hespenheide, 1990
- Agrilus fusicauda Curletti & Migliore, 2014
- Agrilus fusiformis Jendek, 2011
- Agrilus fusus Curletti, 2006
- Agrilus gabonensis Curletti, 2003
- Agrilus gagneuxi Baudon, 1968
- Agrilus galiberti Obenberger, 1931
- Agrilus galileae Curletti & Migliore, 2013
- Agrilus ganesha Jendek, 2021
- Agrilus ganglbaueri Semenov, 1891
- Agrilus gaoligong Jendek, 2000
- Agrilus gardneri Théry, 1929
- Agrilus garo Jendek, 2015
- Agrilus garoensis Jendek, 2021
- Agrilus garrulus Kerremans, 1903
- Agrilus gaudens Kerremans, 1897
- Agrilus gayeli Curletti, 2006
- Agrilus gazzellus Curletti & Dutto, 1999
- Agrilus gebhardti Obenberger, 1935
- Agrilus gebleri Obenberger, 1924
- Agrilus gedeanus Obenberger, 1931
- Agrilus gedeellus Novak & Curletti, 2008
- Agrilus gedenus Novak & Curletti, 2008
- Agrilus gedyei Théry, 1941
- Agrilus geiseri Curletti, 2019
- Agrilus gemellus Jendek & Grebennikov, 2018
- Agrilus geminatus (Say, 1823)
- Agrilus generosus Kerremans, 1896
- Agrilus genieri Curletti, 2011
- Agrilus genseae Baudon, 1960
- Agrilus gentilis Deyrolle, 1864
- Agrilus geoffroyi Obenberger, 1933
- Agrilus georgesi Baudon, 1968
- Agrilus geraudi Bourgoin, 1925
- Agrilus geronimoi Knull, 1950
- Agrilus gerschuni Stepanov, 1958
- Agrilus gestroi Kerremans, 1906
- Agrilus gialai Jendek, 2021
- Agrilus gianassoi Magnani & Niehuis, 1994
- Agrilus gianfrancoi Bellamy, 2004
- Agrilus gianlucai Curletti, 1997
- Agrilus gibbicollis Fall, 1901
- Agrilus gibbifrons (Waterhouse, 1889)
- Agrilus gibbosus Kerremans, 1899
- Agrilus giesberti Hespenheide in Hespenheide & Bellamy, 2009
- Agrilus gigii Curletti, 2020
- Agrilus giglii Curletti, 2002
- Agrilus gileti Obenberger, 1933
- Agrilus gillespiensis Knull, 1947
- Agrilus giloloensis Saunders, 1871
- Agrilus gilvopictus Kerremans, 1897
- Agrilus giorgiae Curletti, 2004
- Agrilus giraffa Curletti, 2006
- Agrilus giraudi Baudon, 1965
- Agrilus giubbicola Obenberger, 1940
- Agrilus glaber Curletti & Brûlé, 2013
- Agrilus glabratus Waterhouse, 1889
- Agrilus glebae Curletti, 2010
- Agrilus globulifrons Obenberger, 1920
- Agrilus gloriosulus Péringuey, 1908
- Agrilus goergeni Curletti & Vayssières, 2007
- Agrilus goichetae Baudon, 1965
- Agrilus goldsteini Curletti, 2010
- Agrilus golettoi Curletti, 1997
- Agrilus golondrinus Curletti & Pineda, 2022
- Agrilus goodi Curletti, 1995
- Agrilus gorai Fisher, 1925
- Agrilus gordoni Curletti & Sakalian, 2009
- Agrilus gorgan Jendek & Nakládal, 2019
- Agrilus goryellus Thomson, 1879
- Agrilus goryi Saunders, 1871
- Agrilus gounellei Kerremans, 1897
- Agrilus gouyei Baudon, 1965
- Agrilus goyaz Bellamy, 1998
- Agrilus gracchus Obenberger, 1935
- Agrilus graciae Obenberger, 1932
- Agrilus gracilipes Waterhouse, 1889
- Agrilus gracilis Deyrolle, 1864
- Agrilus gracilitarsis Waterhouse, 1889
- Agrilus graecus Obenberger, 1916
- Agrilus grallus Curletti, 2002
- Agrilus graminis Kiesenwetter, 1857
- Agrilus grandiceps Kiesenwetter, 1857
- Agrilus grandinatus Curletti, 2010
- Agrilus grandis Gory & Laporte, 1837
- Agrilus granulatus (Say, 1823)
- Agrilus granulicollis Gory & Laporte, 1837
- Agrilus granulosus Gory & Laporte, 1837
- Agrilus graptelytrus Obenberger, 1914
- Agrilus gratiosulus (Obenberger, 1932)
- Agrilus gratiosus Deyrolle, 1864
- Agrilus gratus Kerremans, 1899
- Agrilus graueri Kerremans, 1914
- Agrilus gravedinosus Obenberger, 1935
- Agrilus gravenhorsti Obenberger, 1935
- Agrilus grebennikovi Jendek, 2021
- Agrilus gregori Obenberger, 1936
- Agrilus gressitti Curletti, 2006
- Agrilus grilloi Obenberger, 1933
- Agrilus grisator Kerremans, 1893
- Agrilus griseoniger Hespenheide, 1990
- Agrilus griseonotatus Kerremans, 1899
- Agrilus griseopictus Kerremans, 1898
- Agrilus grisescens Deyrolle, 1864
- Agrilus grobbelaarae Curletti, 2000
- Agrilus grobleri Curletti, 2000
- Agrilus grouvellei Kerremans, 1896
- Agrilus grusinus Obenberger, 1917
- Agrilus gryllus Curletti, 2022
- Agrilus guarani Obenberger, 1933
- Agrilus guardianus Curletti, 2020
- Agrilus gueorguievi Curletti & Sakalian, 2009
- Agrilus guercyi Obenberger, 1933
- Agrilus guerinii Lacordaire in Boisduval & Lacordaire, 1835
- Agrilus gumia Obenberger, 1935
- Agrilus guningi Kerremans, 1911
- Agrilus gunjii Tôyama, 1987
- Agrilus gussakovskiji Alexeev, 1981
- Agrilus gutowskii Hołyński, 2018
- Agrilus guttifer Kerremans, 1900
- Agrilus guttulatus Deyrolle, 1864
- Agrilus gyleki Obenberger, 1917
- Agrilus gyllenhalius Obenberger, 1933
- Agrilus haafi Curletti, 2002
- Agrilus habilis Kerremans, 1903
- Agrilus haenkei Obenberger, 1932
- Agrilus haesitans Curletti, 2002
- Agrilus hainanus Jendek, 2021
- Agrilus hainuwele Jendek, 2021
- Agrilus haladai Curletti, 2018
- Agrilus hallei Curletti, 2000
- Agrilus han Jendek, 2011
- Agrilus hani Jendek, 2011
- Agrilus haniquei Baudon, 1965
- Agrilus hanoti Curletti, 2019
- Agrilus hansi Obenberger, 1933
- Agrilus harenus Nelson, 1994
- Agrilus harlequin Obenberger, 1924
- Agrilus harmodius Obenberger, 1935
- Agrilus harpagon Obenberger, 1931
- Agrilus hartebeestensis Obenberger, 1939
- Agrilus hasegawai Kurosawa, 1954
- Agrilus hassani Théry, 1930
- Agrilus hastulatus Fåhraeus in Boheman, 1851
- Agrilus hastulifer (Ratzeburg, 1837)
- Agrilus hastuliformis Novak, 2003
- Agrilus hattorii Nakane, 1983
- Agrilus haucki Jendek in Jendek & Grebennikov, 2009
- Agrilus hauckirius Curletti, 2019
- Agrilus hayekae Descarpentries & Villiers, 1963
- Agrilus hazardi Knull, 1966
- Agrilus hectori Curletti, 2005
- Agrilus hehe Curletti & Dutto, 1999
- Agrilus henroti Descarpentries & Villiers, 1963
- Agrilus herbophagus Curletti, 2016
- Agrilus hergovitsi Jendek & Grebennikov, 2019
- Agrilus herostratus Obenberger, 1935
- Agrilus hespenheidei Nelson in Nelson & Westcott, 1991
- Agrilus hesperus Kerremans, 1897
- Agrilus heterothecae Knull, 1972
- Agrilus hexacanthus Obenberger, 1935
- Agrilus hexaspilotus Descarpentries & Villiers, 1963
- Agrilus hexaspinus Obenberger, 1923
- Agrilus hexastigmus Bourgoin, 1925
- Agrilus heyrovskyanus Obenberger, 1935
- Agrilus hiatus Jendek, 2007
- Agrilus hibisci Montrouzier, 1855
- Agrilus hiekei Curletti, 1994
- Agrilus hieroglyphicus Kerremans, 1899
- Agrilus hik Jendek & Grebennikov, 2019
- Agrilus hilaris Waterhouse, 1889
- Agrilus hildebrandti Harold, 1878
- Agrilus hinnulus Obenberger, 1933
- Agrilus hintoni Fisher, 1933
- Agrilus hirashimai Kurosawa, 1964
- Agrilus hirsutulus Deyrolle, 1864
- Agrilus hispaniolae Hespenheide, 1998
- Agrilus histrio Kerremans, 1914
- Agrilus hittita Magnani, 1996
- Agrilus hmong Jendek, 2011
- Agrilus hobsoni Baudon, 1968
- Agrilus holubiellus Obenberger, 1939
- Agrilus holynskii Curletti, 1997
- Agrilus holzschuhi Jendek, 1994
- Agrilus homocletes Obenberger, 1933
- Agrilus honestus Kerremans, 1896
- Agrilus honorius Obenberger, 1933
- Agrilus horaki Jendek, 2000
- Agrilus hornburgi Jendek, 2007
- Agrilus hornburgianus Curletti, 2020
- Agrilus horni Kerremans, 1900
- Agrilus hornianus Kerremans, 1912
- Agrilus horniellus Obenberger, 1935
- Agrilus hortator Obenberger, 1924
- Agrilus hoschekanus Obenberger, 1933
- Agrilus hoscheki Obenberger, 1916
- Agrilus hostia Fisher, 1944
- Agrilus howanus Obenberger, 1935
- Agrilus howdenae Curletti, 2000
- Agrilus howdeni Knull, 1957
- Agrilus howdenorum Hespenheide, 2008
- Agrilus huachucae Schaeffer, 1905
- Agrilus hualpaii Knull, 1939
- Agrilus huascar Obenberger, 1932
- Agrilus huashanus Jendek, 2001
- Agrilus huggerti Juárez-Noé, González-Coronado & Curletti, 2024
- Agrilus hui Jendek, 2011
- Agrilus humboldti Obenberger, 1933
- Agrilus humerosus Fairmaire, 1850
- Agrilus humilis Kerremans, 1895
- Agrilus hunanus Jendek in Jendek & Grebennikov, 2009
- Agrilus hybridus Curletti, 2003
- Agrilus hylaeae Obenberger, 1935
- Agrilus hypatus Obenberger, 1933
- Agrilus hyperici (Creutzer, 1799) — St. John's wort root borer
- Agrilus hypericicola Abeille de Perrin, 1893
- Agrilus hyperosmic Jendek, 2021
- Agrilus hypochoreon Obenberger, 1933
- Agrilus hypocritus Deyrolle, 1864
- Agrilus hypoianthus Obenberger, 1935
- Agrilus hypoleucus Gory & Laporte, 1837
- Agrilus hystrix Curletti, 2018
- Agrilus iablokoffi Descarpentries & Villiers, 1963
- Agrilus iaotli Fisher, 1938
- Agrilus iban Jendek, 2015
- Agrilus ibericus Sánchez & Tolosa, 2005
- Agrilus ibiscanus Curletti, 2007
- Agrilus icanus Curletti, 2020
- Agrilus ichikoae Tôyama, 1987
- Agrilus ichthyocerus (Perty, 1830)
- Agrilus idas Obenberger, 1935
- Agrilus idoneus Kerremans, 1903
- Agrilus ieiunulus Obenberger, 1936
- Agrilus ignarus Kerremans, 1897
- Agrilus ignavus Kerremans, 1897
- Agrilus igneosignatus Dugès, 1891
- Agrilus ignicaudatellus Thomson, 1878
- Agrilus ignifrons Deyrolle, 1864
- Agrilus ignipennis Lucas, 1857
- Agrilus ignotus Waterhouse, 1889
- Agrilus ika Jendek & Grebennikov, 2019
- Agrilus iliganensis Fisher, 1921
- Agrilus illectus Fall, 1901
- Agrilus illibatus Kerremans, 1903
- Agrilus illocatus Hołyński, 2018
- Agrilus imasakai Tôyama, 1985
- Agrilus imbellis Crotch, 1873
- Agrilus imbricatus Gory, 1841
- Agrilus imitans Lewis, 1893
- Agrilus imitator Obenberger, 1933
- Agrilus imitor Jendek, 2013
- Agrilus immaculatellus Thomson, 1879
- Agrilus immaculatus Fisher, 1921
- Agrilus immaculicollis Thomson, 1878
- Agrilus immaculifrons Waterhouse, 1889
- Agrilus immsi Obenberger, 1933
- Agrilus impar Kerremans, 1897
- Agrilus imperialis Jendek, 2021
- Agrilus impexus Horn, 1891
- Agrilus impopularis Deyrolle, 1864
- Agrilus importunus Kerremans, 1903
- Agrilus impressicollis Gory, 1841
- Agrilus impressihumeralis Jendek, 2021
- Agrilus impressipennis Thomson, 1879
- Agrilus improbabilis Curletti, 2020
- Agrilus improcerus Jendek, 2011
- Agrilus impudens Kerremans, 1897
- Agrilus inachus Obenberger, 1935
- Agrilus inadai Fukutomi, 2006
- Agrilus inaequalis Waterhouse, 1889
- Agrilus inamoenus Kerremans, 1892
- Agrilus inauratum Curletti, 2018
- Agrilus inauratus Curletti & Brûlé, 2014
- Agrilus incerticolor Deyrolle, 1864
- Agrilus incertus Chevrolat, 1835
- Agrilus inclinatus Waterhouse, 1889
- Agrilus incompositus Curletti, 2003
- Agrilus incongruellus Obenberger, 1935
- Agrilus inconstans (Théry, 1905)
- Agrilus incrassatus Jendek, 2017
- Agrilus incredulus Curletti, 2005
- Agrilus indagator Kerremans, 1900
- Agrilus indigaceus Deyrolle, 1864
- Agrilus indiges Obenberger, 1935
- Agrilus indignus Fairmaire, 1849
- Agrilus indocilis Obenberger, 1931
- Agrilus indulgens Kerremans, 1897
- Agrilus ineditus Chevrolat, 1838
- Agrilus ineptus Kerremans, 1892
- Agrilus inermis Fisher, 1921
- Agrilus inexpectatus Novak & Curletti, 2007
- Agrilus infelix Gory, 1841
- Agrilus infernus Jendek, 2021
- Agrilus infimus Kerremans, 1899
- Agrilus inflammatus Curletti & Ong, 2023
- Agrilus inflatus Kerremans, 1897
- Agrilus infuscatus Kerremans, 1897
- Agrilus ingae Curletti, 2005
- Agrilus inhabilis Kerremans, 1900
- Agrilus iniudicatus Curletti, 1998
- Agrilus innotatus Fisher, 1921
- Agrilus inops Kerremans, 1892
- Agrilus inornatulus Obenberger, 1935
- Agrilus inornatus Kerremans, 1896
- Agrilus inquinatus Saunders, 1874
- Agrilus insidiosus Kerremans, 1896
- Agrilus insipidus Deyrolle, 1864
- Agrilus insolitus Curletti, 2002
- Agrilus insularis Deyrolle, 1864
- Agrilus insulicolus Kerremans, 1912
- Agrilus insuperatus Descarpentries & Villiers, 1963
- Agrilus integerrimus (Ratzeburg, 1837)
- Agrilus integrus Curletti & Dutto, 1999
- Agrilus intercoxalis Jendek, 2021
- Agrilus interdictus Curletti & Goergen, 2011
- Agrilus intermedius Kerremans, 1897
- Agrilus intermixtus Curletti & Brûlé, 2021
- Agrilus interstitialis Hespenheide & Westcott, 2011
- Agrilus intimus Curletti & Ong, 2023
- Agrilus intrusulus Obenberger, 1935
- Agrilus intrusus Kerremans, 1914
- Agrilus inusitatus Curletti, 2018
- Agrilus invectus Curletti & Dutto, 1999
- Agrilus ipabog Jendek, 2021
- Agrilus iquitosanus Curletti, 2019
- Agrilus iracundus Curletti, 1995
- Agrilus iriei Tôyama, 1985
- Agrilus irregularis Kerremans, 1899
- Agrilus irreprehensus Obenberger, 1931
- Agrilus irrequietus Thomson, 1879
- Agrilus irritator Obenberger, 1936
- Agrilus irrorellus Harold, 1869
- Agrilus irruptus Obenberger, 1931
- Agrilus iruwimensis Obenberger, 1936
- Agrilus isabellae Obenberger, 1921
- Agrilus isoberliniae Curletti & Vayssières, 2007
- Agrilus ittericus Curletti & Brûlé, 2021
- Agrilus iucundus Curletti, 2003
- Agrilus iustusventer Curletti & Ong, 2022
- Agrilus ivetteae Curletti, 2010
- Agrilus ivorianus Curletti, 2013
- Agrilus ixcuinae Fisher, 1938
- Agrilus jacetanus Sánchez & Tolosa, 2004
- Agrilus jacobinus Horn, 1891
- Agrilus jacobsoni Fisher, 1926
- Agrilus jadwigae Holynski, 1998
- Agrilus jadwiszczaki Hołyński, 2018
- Agrilus jaechi Jendek, 2018
- Agrilus jakli Jendek, 2015
- Agrilus jamaicensis Hespenheide, 1998
- Agrilus jaminae Baudon, 1968
- Agrilus jankae Jendek & Grebennikov, 2019
- Agrilus japanocarinatus Ohmomo, 2002
- Agrilus japyx Obenberger, 1935
- Agrilus jarbas Obenberger, 1935
- Agrilus jarilo Jendek, 2021
- Agrilus jarrensis Baudon, 1968
- Agrilus jarrigei Descarpentries & Villiers, 1963
- Agrilus jasius Obenberger, 1935
- Agrilus javicolus Fisher, 1935
- Agrilus jeanneli Kerremans, 1914
- Agrilus jedlickai Obenberger, 1931
- Agrilus jejunus Obenberger, 1933
- Agrilus jemjemensis Théry, 1937
- Agrilus jendeki Hołyński, 2018
- Agrilus jenningsi Fisher, 1938
- Agrilus jiloi Curletti & Sakalian, 2009
- Agrilus jindrai Jendek, 2011
- Agrilus jobi Baudon, 1968
- Agrilus josei Obenberger, 1935
- Agrilus joukli Obenberger, 1931
- Agrilus juglandis Knull, 1920
- Agrilus jugurtha Abeille de Perrin, 1900
- Agrilus julius Obenberger, 1933
- Agrilus jum Jendek & Grebennikov, 2019>
- Agrilus jumbo Curletti, 2002
- Agrilus junceus (Pallas, 1781)
- Agrilus jussieui Obenberger, 1933
- Agrilus juxtasuturalis Abeille de Perrin, 1897
- Agrilus kadamparai Jendek, 2021
- Agrilus kackovskii Obenberger, 1935
- Agrilus kafkai Jendek, 2021
- Agrilus kakamegae Curletti, 2012
- Agrilus kalamboinus Obenberger, 1935
- Agrilus kalshoveni Obenberger, 1931
- Agrilus kaluganus Obenberger, 1940
- Agrilus kambu Hołyński, 2018
- Agrilus kandaricus Gestro, 1877
- Agrilus kandyanus Théry, 1904
- Agrilus kangaroo Curletti, 2001
- Agrilus kanssuanus Obenberger, 1930
- Agrilus kapiriensis Curletti & Brûlé, 2013
- Agrilus karakae Fisher, 1936
- Agrilus karen Jendek, 2021
- Agrilus karrooi Curletti, 2000
- Agrilus kartikeya Jendek, 2021
- Agrilus kashituensis Obenberger, 1935
- Agrilus kassaigena Obenberger, 1931
- Agrilus kaszabi Pochon, 1967
- Agrilus kawarai Kurosawa, 1963
- Agrilus kawi Curletti & Brûlé, 2017
- Agrilus kedahae Fisher, 1930
- Agrilus kedirianus Obenberger, 1931
- Agrilus kenge Curletti & Dutto, 1999
- Agrilus kenniah Fisher, 1930
- Agrilus keralensis Seena, Anand & Shibu-Vardhanan, 2022
- Agrilus kerremansellus Obenberger, 1935
- Agrilus kerremansi Dugès, 1891
- Agrilus kettneri Curletti & van Harten, 2004
- Agrilus keyensis Kerremans, 1894
- Agrilus kheili Obenberger, 1924
- Agrilus khene Jendek, 2021
- Agrilus khunborom Jendek & Grebennikov, 2018
- Agrilus kiloanus Obenberger, 1935
- Agrilus kindianus Curletti, 1995
- Agrilus kinuthiae Curletti & Sakalian, 2009
- Agrilus kirbyi Obenberger, 1933
- Agrilus klapperichianus Cobos, 1966
- Agrilus klotinus Curletti & Goergen, 2011
- Agrilus klugianus Obenberger, 1933
- Agrilus knabi Fisher, 1938
- Agrilus koala Curletti, 2001
- Agrilus kobayashii Tôyama, 1987
- Agrilus kocheri Baudon, 1956
- Agrilus kodanad Jendek, 2021
- Agrilus koikei Curletti & Pineda, 2022
- Agrilus kokaburra Curletti, 2001
- Agrilus koliada Jendek, 2021
- Agrilus kolibaci Jendek, 2021
- Agrilus kolleri Kerremans, 1912
- Agrilus komareki Obenberger, 1926
- Agrilus kon Jendek & Grebennikov, 2019
- Agrilus korbicola Jendek, 2017
- Agrilus korbu Jendek, 2021
- Agrilus korenskyi Obenberger, 1923
- Agrilus kormilevi Bílý, 1975
- Agrilus korsakovi Obenberger, 1935
- Agrilus koshantshikovi Obenberger, 1933
- Agrilus kostali Jendek, 2007
- Agrilus kotoensis Miwa & Chûjô, 1940
- Agrilus koyoi Ohmomo, 2002
- Agrilus kraatzi Kerremans, 1899
- Agrilus krantzi Kerremans, 1911
- Agrilus kratochvili Obenberger, 1936
- Agrilus krsnik Jendek, 2021
- Agrilus kuangcenensis Obenberger, 1940
- Agrilus kubani Bílý, 1991
- Agrilus kucerai Jendek, 2011
- Agrilus kuchingensis Tôyama, 1987
- Agrilus kuchingi Jendek, 2015
- Agrilus kudatensis Fisher, 1930
- Agrilus kudunguruus Obenberger, 1935
- Agrilus kundasang Jendek, 2021
- Agrilus kurandae Obenberger, 1923
- Agrilus kurumi Kurosawa, 1957
- Agrilus kusakievici Obenberger, 1936
- Agrilus kutahyanus Królik, 2002
- Agrilus kuzikusensis Curletti & Cristiano, 2013
- Agrilus kuznecovi Obenberger, 1933
- Agrilus kyklos Jendek & Grebennikov, 2018
- Agrilus lacordairei Gory & Laporte, 1837
- Agrilus lacrima Jendek, 2011
- Agrilus lacrimans Curletti & Brûlé, 2013
- Agrilus lacroixi Obenberger, 1936
- Agrilus lacus Curletti & Ponel, 1994
- Agrilus lacustris LeConte, 1860
- Agrilus laelius Obenberger, 1935
- Agrilus laetabilis Kerremans, 1897
- Agrilus laetecyanescens Obenberger, 1940
- Agrilus laetifrons Mannerheim, 1837
- Agrilus laetitius Obenberger, 1935
- Agrilus laetulus Waterhouse, 1889
- Agrilus laetus Waterhouse, 1889
- Agrilus laevifrons Kerremans, 1900
- Agrilus laevipennis Waterhouse, 1889
- Agrilus laeviventris Kerremans, 1900
- Agrilus lafertei Kerremans, 1892
- Agrilus lagosinus Obenberger, 1931
- Agrilus lahu Jendek, 2011
- Agrilus lamarcki Obenberger, 1933
- Agrilus lamatus Curletti & Brûlé
- Agrilus lameerei Kerremans, 1912
- Agrilus lamelligaster Jendek, 2021
- Agrilus laminatus Curletti & Brûlé, 2011
- Agrilus lampros Jendek, 2013
- Agrilus lampyrus Curletti & Goergen, 2011
- Agrilus lancifer Deyrolle, 1864
- Agrilus lancrenonae Baudon, 1968
- Agrilus lancrenoni Baudon, 1965
- Agrilus langei Obenberger, 1935
- Agrilus langkasukae Fisher, 1933
- Agrilus languens Kerremans, 1903
- Agrilus languidus Chevrolat, 1838
- Agrilus lanzarotensis Cobos, 1969
- Agrilus laomedon Obenberger, 1932
- Agrilus lasiosurus Obenberger, 1935
- Agrilus laterimaculatus Hespenheide, 1990
- Agrilus latevittatus (Waterhouse, 1889)
- Agrilus laticaudatus Waterhouse, 1889
- Agrilus laticeps Waterhouse, 1889
- Agrilus laticornis (Illiger, 1803)
- Agrilus latifrons Waterhouse, 1889
- Agrilus latipalpis Jendek, 2007
- Agrilus lativertex Hołyński, 2018
- Agrilus laudabilis Kerremans, 1897
- Agrilus laurenconi Descarpentries & Villiers, 1963
- Agrilus lautuelliformis Hespenheide, 1990
- Agrilus lautuellus Fisher, 1928
- Agrilus lautus Kerremans, 1899
- Agrilus lavalettei Curletti & Brûlé, 2014
- Agrilus lavillei Obenberger, 1932
- Agrilus lavoisieri Obenberger, 1933
- Agrilus lazar Obenberger, 1924
- Agrilus lebisi Descarpentries & Villiers, 1963
- Agrilus lecontei Saunders, 1871
- Agrilus leganyi Hołyński, 2018,
- Agrilus legatus Obenberger, 1936
- Agrilus legrosi Descarpentries & Villiers, 1963
- Agrilus leguayi Baudon, 1965
- Agrilus legwai Bellamy, 1998
- Agrilus lei Jendek, 2021
- Agrilus lejeunei Baudon, 1965
- Agrilus leleupi Curletti, 1997
- Agrilus lembik Jendek, 2015
- Agrilus leminus Obenberger, 1932
- Agrilus lemur Obenberger, 1936
- Agrilus lentulus Waterhouse, 1889
- Agrilus leonhardi Kerremans, 1913
- Agrilus lepineyi Théry, 1934
- Agrilus leprieuri Pic, 1918
- Agrilus lesapinus Obenberger, 1935
- Agrilus leshy Jendek, 2021
- Agrilus lesnei Théry, 1934
- Agrilus lessei Descarpentries & Villiers, 1963
- Agrilus lestageanus Obenberger, 1935
- Agrilus lestagei Théry, 1930
- Agrilus letellierae Descarpentries & Villiers, 1963
- Agrilus leucaenae Hespenheide in Hespenheide & Bellamy, 2009
- Agrilus levasseuri Descarpentries & Villiers, 1963
- Agrilus leveyi Curletti, 1998
- Agrilus levifrons Kerremans, 1900
- Agrilus levuensis Théry, 1937
- Agrilus licheti Baudon, 1968
- Agrilus lignicida Curletti & Brûlé, 2011
- Agrilus lijia Curletti & Ong, 2022
- Agrilus likho Jendek, 2021
- Agrilus likoniensis Obenberger, 1928
- Agrilus limesignatus Curletti & Brûlé, 2011
- Agrilus limnophilus Curletti, 1997
- Agrilus limoniastri Bedel, 1886
- Agrilus limpiae Knull, 1941
- Agrilus limpopoensis Obenberger, 1935
- Agrilus limvuanus Kerremans, 1898
- Agrilus linctus Curletti & Ong, 2024
- Agrilus lindae Curletti & Brûlé, 2017
- Agrilus lindryi Baudon, 1968
- Agrilus linea Hołyński, 2018
- Agrilus lineariformis Jendek, 2005
- Agrilus lineatomaculatus Jendek, 1994
- Agrilus lineellus Gory, 1841
- Agrilus lineola Kiesenwetter, 1857
- Agrilus linnei Obenberger, 1933
- Agrilus liscapia Jendek, 2003
- Agrilus listreuon Obenberger, 1935
- Agrilus lisu Jendek, 2011
- Agrilus lithocarpi Curletti, 2006
- Agrilus litura Kiesenwetter, 1857
- Agrilus lituratus (Klug, 1829)
- Agrilus livens Kerremans, 1892
- Agrilus ljubomirovi Curletti & Sakalian, 2009
- Agrilus llanero Obenberger, 1933
- Agrilus lloydae Baudon, 1968
- Agrilus lloydi (Théry, 1940)
- Agrilus loangensis Obenberger, 1931
- Agrilus lobatus Jendek, 2011
- Agrilus loconte Curletti & Brûlé, 2014
- Agrilus loesthus Obenberger, 1935
- Agrilus longelineatus Curletti & Brûlé, 2011
- Agrilus longicollis Saunders, 1866
- Agrilus longicornis Curletti, 2009
- Agrilus longicornis Gory & Laporte, 1837
- Agrilus longitarsus Jendek, 2021
- Agrilus longiusculus Gory & Laporte, 1837
- Agrilus loongfahi Jendek & Grebennikov, 2018
- Agrilus loosdregti Baudon, 1965
- Agrilus lopatini Alexeev, 1964
- Agrilus lopus Obenberger, 1935
- Agrilus loretanus Obenberger, 1933
- Agrilus loupyi Baudon, 1968
- Agrilus luanae Curletti, 2020
- Agrilus lubischevi Stepanov, 1958
- Agrilus lubopetri Jendek, 2000
- Agrilus lucanus Fall, 1906
- Agrilus lucens Kerremans, 1897
- Agrilus lucidicollis Gory, 1841
- Agrilus lucificus Descarpentries & Villiers, 1963
- Agrilus lucindae Hespenheide, 2010
- Agrilus luciolus Curletti & Goergen, 2011
- Agrilus luctator Kerremans, 1903
- Agrilus luctuosellus Obenberger, 1924
- Agrilus luctuosus Kerremans, 1897
- Agrilus luculentus Kerremans, 1900
- Agrilus lucullus Obenberger, 1935
- Agrilus ludificator Obenberger, 1924
- Agrilus luebanus Obenberger, 1931
- Agrilus luederwaldti Obenberger, 1933
- Agrilus lugovoi Stepanov, 1958
- Agrilus lugu Jendek, 2011
- Agrilus lugubris Kerremans, 1914
- Agrilus lukesi Obenberger, 1936
- Agrilus lukuledianus Kerremans, 1907
- Agrilus lulinshan Curletti & Ong, 2022
- Agrilus lunidorsatus Kerremans, 1913
- Agrilus lusinganus Curletti, 1997
- Agrilus luteomicans Curletti, 2012
- Agrilus luteopictus Obenberger, 1931
- Agrilus luteotinctus Curletti & Brûlé, 2023
- Agrilus luzonicola Jendek, 2018
- Agrilus lycaon Obenberger, 1933
- Agrilus maai Curletti, 2006
- Agrilus mabokeanus Curletti, 1998
- Agrilus macellus Bourgoin, 1922
- Agrilus macer LeConte, 1858
- Agrilus machaon Obenberger, 1935
- Agrilus machnovskii Stepanov, 1958
- Agrilus machulkai Obenberger, 1935
- Agrilus maciejewski Hołyński, 2018
- Agrilus macilentus Curletti & Brûlé, 2013
- Agrilus macillentus Obenberger, 1924
- Agrilus macleayi Carter, 1924
- Agrilus macrocephalus Curletti, 2006
- Agrilus macroderus Abeille de Perrin, 1897
- Agrilus macrotatopus Obenberger, 1930
- Agrilus maculatus Gory & Laporte, 1837
- Agrilus maculicollis Gory & Laporte, 1837
- Agrilus maculifer Saunders, 1873
- Agrilus maculifrons Gory, 1841
- Agrilus maculipennis Kerremans, 1900
- Agrilus maculisternis Obenberger, 1932
- Agrilus maculiventris Deyrolle, 1864
- Agrilus madanensis Jendek in Jendek & Grebennikov, 2009
- Agrilus maddalenae Curletti, 1998
- Agrilus madecassus (Fairmaire, 1898)
- Agrilus madeci Baudon, 1968
- Agrilus madegassus Obenberger, 1935
- Agrilus maderi Obenberger, 1932
- Agrilus madjapahit Hołyński, 2018
- Agrilus maeror Curletti & Brûlé, 2011
- Agrilus maesi Curletti, 2011
- Agrilus magnificientis Curletti & Brûlé, 2014
- Agrilus magnifus Jendek, 2013
- Agrilus magnus Jendek, 2011
- Agrilus major Waterhouse, 1889
- Agrilus majungus Curletti, 2018
- Agrilus majzlani Jendek, 2007
- Agrilus makiharai Tôyama, 1987
- Agrilus makiharaiellus Ohmomo, 2006
- Agrilus makonde Curletti, 2002
- Agrilus malasicus Fisher, 1930
- Agrilus malaspinai Curletti & Dutto, 1999
- Agrilus malayanus Obenberger, 1924
- Agrilus maleci Curletti, 2015
- Agrilus maledictus Théry, 1927
- Agrilus mali Matsumura, 1924
- Agrilus malicola Rungs & Schaefer, 1948
- Agrilus malinaoensis Fisher, 1921
- Agrilus malloti Théry, 1930
- Agrilus mallotiellus Kurosawa, 1985
- Agrilus malus Kerremans, 1899
- Agrilus malvastri Fisher, 1928
- Agrilus malyi Obenberger, 1936
- Agrilus manaosensis Obenberger, 1933
- Agrilus manatus Waterhouse, 1889
- Agrilus manchu Jendek, 2011
- Agrilus mancus Obenberger, 1931
- Agrilus mandala Jendek, 2011
- Agrilus mandaricus Kerremans, 1892
- Agrilus mandatus Kerremans, 1913
- Agrilus mandingo Curletti, 1996
- Agrilus mandubius Obenberger, 1935
- Agrilus manfredi Curletti, 2022
- Agrilus mangrai jendek, 2021
- Agrilus manilensis Fisher, 1921
- Agrilus manius Obenberger, 1935
- Agrilus manni Fisher, 1925
- Agrilus mannianus Théry, 1937
- Agrilus mansuetus Thomson, 1879
- Agrilus manueli Curletti, 2019
- Agrilus maquilingensis Fisher, 1921
- Agrilus marcens Obenberger, 1935
- Agrilus mareki Curletti & Brûlé, 2015
- Agrilus marginatus Waterhouse, 1889
- Agrilus marginicollis Saunders, 1873
- Agrilus margotanae Novak, 2001
- Agrilus mari Jendek, 2021
- Agrilus mariae Curletti, 2017
- Agrilus marietae Curletti & Sakalian, 2007
- Agrilus marmoreus Deyrolle, 1864
- Agrilus marozzinii Gobbi, 1974
- Agrilus marreae Descarpentries & Villiers, 1963
- Agrilus marreli Curletti, 2000
- Agrilus marthae Hespenheidei, 2012
- Agrilus martinsi Curletti & Migliore, 2014
- Agrilus masamotoi Ohmomo, 2011
- Agrilus masculinus Horn, 1891
- Agrilus mashukulumbo Obenberger, 1936
- Agrilus mashunus Péringuey, 1908
- Agrilus massanensis Schaefer, 1955
- Agrilus massaronei Curletti, 2013
- Agrilus massikessus Obenberger, 1935
- Agrilus mastersii Macleay, 1872
- Agrilus masumotoi Ohmomo, 2011
- Agrilus matacottai Curletti & Dutto, 1999
- Agrilus mathabathei Bellamy, 1998
- Agrilus mathani Obenberger, 1935
- Agrilus matho Obenberger, 1933
- Agrilus matitinus Curletti & Brûlé, 2014
- Agrilus matoposinus Curletti, 2002
- Agrilus matourinus Curletti & Brûlé, 2014
- Agrilus matsudai Tôyama, 1987
- Agrilus mawambinus Obenberger, 1935
- Agrilus mayeti Théry, 1912
- Agrilus maynaei Kerremans, 1912
- Agrilus mayumbinus Obenberger, 1935
- Agrilus mcgregori Fisher, 1926
- Agrilus mecoatli Fisher, 1938
- Agrilus mediocris Kerremans, 1900
- Agrilus medius Kerremans, 1900
- Agrilus megerlei Fisher, 1933
- Agrilus mehli Jendek, 2021
- Agrilus melanarius Deyrolle, 1864
- Agrilus melancholicus Kerremans, 1897
- Agrilus melanocerus Curletti, 2005
- Agrilus melanolucidus Ohmomo, 2005
- Agrilus melanosoma Obenberger, 1935
- Agrilus melanospilus Hespenheide, 1990
- Agrilus melas Kerremans, 1896
- Agrilus meleager Obenberger, 1935
- Agrilus meliboeformis Descarpentries & Villiers, 1967
- Agrilus meloe Curletti & Brûlé, 2011
- Agrilus menacium Curletti, 2020
- Agrilus meloni Curletti, 1986
- Agrilus mendax Mannerheim, 1837
- Agrilus mendicus Fåhraeus in Boheman, 1851
- Agrilus mentor Kerremans, 1912
- Agrilus mephistinus Obenberger, 1935
- Agrilus meracus Kerremans, 1897
- Agrilus meratus Jendek, 2015
- Agrilus mercurini Théry, 1930
- Agrilus messorius Kerremans, 1903
- Agrilus metallescens Dugès, 1891
- Agrilus metallicus Curletti, 2018
- Agrilus metallinus Jendek & Grebennikov, 2018
- Agrilus methneri Curletti, 2002
- Agrilus meticulosus Deyrolle, 1864
- Agrilus metropolitanus Curletti, 2005
- Agrilus metuens Kerremans, 1903
- Agrilus mexicanus Gory, 1841
- Agrilus miao Jendek, 2011
- Agrilus mica Curletti & Ong, 2022
- Agrilus michielsi Curletti, 2009
- Agrilus micro Curletti, 2000
- Agrilus micromegas Obenberger, 1924
- Agrilus microtatus Obenberger, 1924
- Agrilus midas Curletti & Brûlé, 2014
- Agrilus mikusiakorum Jendek, 2004
- Agrilus milletae Baudon, 1968
- Agrilus milleti Baudon, 1968
- Agrilus milo Obenberger, 1936
- Agrilus mimicus Jendek & Grebennikov
- Agrilus mimnermus Obenberger, 1936
- Agrilus mimosae Fisher, 1928
- Agrilus mindanaoensis Fisher, 1921
- Agrilus minimus Bellamy, 1998
- Agrilus minissimus Curletti & Brûlé, 2011
- Agrilus minor Deyrolle, 1864
- Agrilus minos Deyrolle, 1864
- Agrilus minusculus Marseul, 1866
- Agrilus minutulus Obenberger, 1936
- Agrilus minutus Harold, 1869
- Agrilus mio Jendek, 2011
- Agrilus mirabiliformis Obenberger, 1924
- Agrilus mirandus Obenberger, 1935
- Agrilus mirei Descarpentries & Villiers, 1963
- Agrilus miron Obenberger, 1933
- Agrilus mirus Curletti, 2002
- Agrilus miserabilis Deyrolle, 1864
- Agrilus miserandus Curletti & Brûlé, 2013
- Agrilus miserrimus Curletti & Brûlé, 2016
- Agrilus missai Curletti, 2003
- Agrilus missanus Curletti, 2006
- Agrilus missionum Obenberger, 1947
- Agrilus miwai Obenberger, 1936
- Agrilus mixtoides Jendek, 2021
- Agrilus mixtus Kerremans, 1892
- Agrilus mjoebergi Gebhardt, 1925
- Agrilus mlabri Jendek, 2021
- Agrilus mlanjensis Obenberger, 1935
- Agrilus mocquerysi (Théry, 1905)
- Agrilus modestus Gory & Laporte, 1837
- Agrilus modicus Kerremans, 1892
- Agrilus modiglianii Kerremans, 1894
- Agrilus moerens Saunders, 1873
- Agrilus mogadoricus Escalera, 1914
- Agrilus mole Curletti, 2002
- Agrilus molestus Waterhouse, 1889
- Agrilus molirensis Kerremans, 1898
- Agrilus molitor Abeille de Perrin, 1897
- Agrilus moloch Curletti, 2001
- Agrilus molochitis Curletti, 2008
- Agrilus mombassicus Obenberger, 1931
- Agrilus monadikos Jendek & Nakládal, 2019
- Agrilus mongolorum Obenberger, 1936
- Agrilus monicae Hołyński, 2020
- Agrilus monogrammus Thomson, 1879
- Agrilus monotonus Thomson, 1879
- Agrilus montanus Jendek, 2013
- Agrilus monteithi Curletti, 2008
- Agrilus montezuma Fisher, 1933
- Agrilus monticola Kerremans, 1906
- Agrilus montosae Barr, 2008
- Agrilus moraguesi Curletti & Brûlé, 2011
- Agrilus morawitzi Obenberger, 1936
- Agrilus morelae Baudon, 1968
- Agrilus moreli Baudon, 1968
- Agrilus morio Kerremans, 1895
- Agrilus moriscus Obenberger, 1913
- Agrilus morobensis Curletti, 2006
- Agrilus morrissae Baudon, 1965
- Agrilus morsoventre Curletti, 2020
- Agrilus morus Curletti, 1995
- Agrilus morvanae Curletti & Brûlé, 2011
- Agrilus motobuanus Fukutomi, 2006
- Agrilus motoinus Obenberger, 1935
- Agrilus motschulskyi Théry, 1904
- Agrilus moultoni Kerremans, 1912
- Agrilus mourgliai Curletti, 1997
- Agrilus mouricouae Baudon, 1965
- Agrilus mrazi (Obenberger, 1922)
- Agrilus mucidus Jendek, 2013
- Agrilus mucronatus (Klug, 1825)
- Agrilus muehlei Curletti, 1998
- Agrilus muehleicus Curletti, 2002
- Agrilus muehlheimi (Obenberger, 1916)
- Agrilus mulsus Obenberger, 1935
- Agrilus multispinosus (Klug, 1825)
- Agrilus mundanus Obenberger, 1935
- Agrilus mundulus Obenberger, 1936
- Agrilus mungaii Curletti & Sakalian, 2009
- Agrilus munieri Brisout de Barneville, 1883
- Agrilus munificus Kerremans, 1897
- Agrilus muong Descarpentries & Villiers, 1967
- Agrilus muongoides Jendek, 2011
- Agrilus murmillo Curletti & Brûlé, 2013
- Agrilus murrayi Saunders, 1871
- Agrilus murut Jendek, 2021
- Agrilus murzini Curletti, 1995
- Agrilus mus Jendek & Nakládal, 2019
- Agrilus muscarius Kerremans, 1895
- Agrilus muscicoloratus Hespenheide, 1990
- Agrilus musculosus Curletti & Brûlé, 2014
- Agrilus mustus Kerremans, 1912
- Agrilus mutabilis Waterhouse, 1889
- Agrilus mutantor Curletti, 2018
- Agrilus muticus LeConte, 1858
- Agrilus mwengwae Obenberger, 1935
- Agrilus myopic Jendek, 2000
- Agrilus myops Curletti, 1998
- Agrilus myrmido Kerremans, 1912
- Agrilus mysticus Curletti & Brûlé, 2013
- Agrilus mythicus Hołyński, 2018
- Agrilus nagahatai Jendek, 2007
- Agrilus nagaoi Nakane, 1983
- Agrilus naivashensis Curletti & Sakalian, 2007
- Agrilus najarae Curletti, Ribeiro & Migliore, 2016
- Agrilus nalajchanus Cobos, 1968
- Agrilus nalandae Théry, 1904
- Agrilus naomii Tôyama, 1988
- Agrilus napatecutli Fisher, 1938
- Agrilus napoi Curletti, 2022
- Agrilus narcissus Obenberger, 1917
- Agrilus nasutus Curletti & Ong, 2022
- Agrilus natalensis Obenberger, 1935
- Agrilus nataligenus Obenberger, 1935
- Agrilus nativus Jendek, 2021
- Agrilus navarrei Baudon, 1965
- Agrilus naxi Jendek, 2011
- Agrilus neabditus Knull, 1935
- Agrilus nebulatus Curletti, 2006
- Agrilus nebulosus Jendek, 2013
- Agrilus needhami Obenberger, 1933
- Agrilus neelgheriensis Kerremans, 1892
- Agrilus negrito Hołyński, 2018
- Agrilus nelae Curletti, 2000
- Agrilus nelsondaimio Ohmomo, 2006
- Agrilus nemethi Théry, 1930
- Agrilus nemoralis Jendek & Grebennikov, 2018
- Agrilus neocles Obenberger, 1932
- Agrilus neocollaris Hespenheide, 1974
- Agrilus neoflohri Hespenheide, 1974
- Agrilus neoprosopidus Knull, 1938
- Agrilus nepalensis Tôyama, 1988
- Agrilus nervosus Kerremans, 1900
- Agrilus neuquensis Kerremans, 1903
- Agrilus nevadensis Horn, 1891
- Agrilus nevermanni Fisher, 1929
- Agrilus nginni Baudon, 1968
- Agrilus ngonensis Baudon, 1968
- Agrilus nickerli Obenberger, 1935
- Agrilus nicolanus Obenberger, 1924
- Agrilus niehuisi Curletti, 1995
- Agrilus niger Gory & Laporte, 1837
- Agrilus nigerellus Thomson, 1879
- Agrilus nigeriae Obenberger, 1935
- Agrilus nigerrimus Deyrolle, 1864
- Agrilus nigricans Gory, 1841
- Agrilus nigritus Kerremans, 1895
- Agrilus nigroaeneus Deyrolle, 1864
- Agrilus nigroauratus Hespenheide, 1990
- Agrilus nigrobrunneus Curletti & Brûlé, 2017
- Agrilus nigrocinctus Saunders, 1874
- Agrilus nigrocyaneus Deyrolle, 1864
- Agrilus nigrofasciatus (Gory & Laporte, 1839)
- Agrilus nigropurpurea Bílý, 2017
- Agrilus nigror Curletti & Brûlé, 2011
- Agrilus nigroviolaceus Deyrolle, 1864
- Agrilus niisatoi Tôyama, 1987
- Agrilus nimbanus Curletti, 2021
- Agrilus ningitus Curletti, 2020
- Agrilus ningpoensis Obenberger, 1927
- Agrilus nipponigena Obenberger, 1935
- Agrilus nirius Obenberger, 1924
- Agrilus nishiyamai Tôyama, 1985
- Agrilus nitidifrons Kerremans, 1898
- Agrilus nitidus Kerremans, 1898
- Agrilus nivatus Curletti, 2020
- Agrilus niveoguttatus Kerremans, 1892
- Agrilus niveosignatus Obenberger, 1914
- Agrilus niviferus (Théry, 1905)
- Agrilus nivosus Abeille de Perrin, 1900
- Agrilus nixius Kerremans, 1896
- Agrilus njegus Obenberger, 1935
- Agrilus njugunai Curletti & Sakalian, 2009
- Agrilus nobilis Burmeister, 1872
- Agrilus nobilitatus Kerremans, 1899
- Agrilus noctambulus Curletti & Brûlé, 2011
- Agrilus nocturnus Curletti, 2006
- Agrilus nodieri Obenberger, 1924
- Agrilus nodifrons Waterhouse, 1889
- Agrilus noelemahc Curletti, 2018
- Agrilus noguerae Hespenheide, 1990
- Agrilus nokrek Jendek, 2007
- Agrilus normanbyanus Curletti, 2006
- Agrilus nossibanus Obenberger, 1931
- Agrilus notabilis Kerremans, 1900
- Agrilus notatus Kerremans, 1899
- Agrilus notoclavus Jendek, 2000
- Agrilus notus Kerremans, 1903
- Agrilus novaki Curletti & Sakalian, 2009
- Agrilus novellus Curletti & Brûlé, 2011
- Agrilus novembris Curletti & Brûlé, 2023
- Agrilus noviusculus Curletti, 2018
- Agrilus novotnyi Curletti, 2017
- Agrilus nubeculosus Fairmaire, 1890
- Agrilus nubilus Kerremans, 1892
- Agrilus nudatus Kerremans, 1894
- Agrilus nudidorsis Curletti, 2015
- Agrilus nudoventre Curletti & Brûlé, 2014
- Agrilus nullus Curletti, 2018
- Agrilus numbat Curletti, 2001
- Agrilus nutritus Curletti & Brûlé, 2023
- Agrilus nylanderi Hołyński, 2018
- Agrilus nyx Jendek, 2021
- Agrilus oasis Obenberger, 1922
- Agrilus obdurescens Obenberger, 1928
- Agrilus oberprieleri Curletti, 2000
- Agrilus oberthuri Kerremans, 1897
- Agrilus oberthuroides Curletti & Brûlé, 2016
- Agrilus obesus Jendek, 2021
- Agrilus oblatus Kerremans, 1900
- Agrilus oblitus Waterhouse, 1889
- Agrilus oblongonotatus Curletti, 2002
- Agrilus oblongus Fisher, 1928
- Agrilus obnotatus Kerremans, 1912
- Agrilus obnubiloides Obenberger, 1935
- Agrilus obolinus LeConte, 1860
- Agrilus oborili Curletti, 2018
- Agrilus obrienorum Hespenheide in Hespenheide & Bellamy, 2009
- Agrilus obscurecinctus Obenberger, 1935
- Agrilus obscureguttatus (Waterhouse, 1889)
- Agrilus obscurellus Thomson, 1878
- Agrilus obscuricollis Kiesenwetter, 1857
- Agrilus obscuricolor Hespenheide, 1990
- Agrilus obscurilineatus Vogt, 1949
- Agrilus obscuripennis Gory, 1841
- Agrilus obscurosericeus Obenberger, 1940
- Agrilus obscurus Deyrolle, 1864
- Agrilus observans Waterhouse, 1889
- Agrilus obsoletoguttatus Gory, 1841
- Agrilus obsoletovittatus Fisher, 1929
- Agrilus obsoletulus Obenberger, 1935
- Agrilus obsoletus Gory, 1841
- Agrilus obtusus Horn, 1891
- Agrilus obustulus Obenberger, 1924
- Agrilus occidenticola Obenberger, 1936
- Agrilus occipitalis (Eschscholtz, 1822)
- Agrilus occultus Jendek & Nakládal, 2019
- Agrilus oceanicus Cobos, 1959
- Agrilus ocellatus Curletti, 1998
- Agrilus ochraceomaculatus Fisher, 1929
- Agrilus octavius Obenberger, 1935
- Agrilus octogemmatus Obenberger, 1935
- Agrilus octonotatus Saunders, 1866
- Agrilus octosignatus Gyllenhal in Schönherr, 1817
- Agrilus ocularis Deyrolle, 1864
- Agrilus ocularius Curletti, 1998
- Agrilus oculatus Waterhouse, 1889
- Agrilus oculifer Kerremans, 1899
- Agrilus ocyalus Obenberger, 1942
- Agrilus odegaardi Curletti, 2005
- Agrilus odetteae Baudon, 1968
- Agrilus odysseus Curletti, 2021
- Agrilus oedipus Deyrolle, 1864
- Agrilus ogatai Ohmomo, 2002
- Agrilus ogloblini Obenberger, 1933
- Agrilus ogooueensis Théry, 1931
- Agrilus ohioensis Knull, 1951
- Agrilus oidema Jendek, 2017
- Agrilus oinoicus Curletti & Brûlé, 2015
- Agrilus oishii Tôyama, 1987
- Agrilus okinawensis Miwa, 1933
- Agrilus olentangyi Champlain & Knull, 1925
- Agrilus olifantinus Obenberger, 1939
- Agrilus olivaceoaeneus Hespenheide, 1990
- Agrilus olivaceocupreus Hespenheide, 1990
- Agrilus olivaceoniger Fisher, 1928
- Agrilus oliverai Curletti, 2017
- Agrilus oliveri Niehuis, 1989
- Agrilus olivicolor Kiesenwetter, 1857
- Agrilus olmii Curletti, 1998
- Agrilus oltepesii Curletti, 2021
- Agrilus olympicus Deyrolle, 1864
- Agrilus omearai Curletti, 2000
- Agrilus omecatli Fisher, 1938
- Agrilus ometauhtli Fisher, 1938
- Agrilus omissulus Obenberger, 1935
- Agrilus omissus Kerremans, 1903
- Agrilus omphax Obenberger, 1933
- Agrilus onca Curletti, 2020
- Agrilus oneratus Obenberger, 1924
- Agrilus onorei Curletti, 2022
- Agrilus oomsisensis Curletti, 2006
- Agrilus opacipennis Waterhouse, 1889
- Agrilus operosus Obenberger, 1924
- Agrilus ophidius Curletti, 2006
- Agrilus ophthalmoedrus Obenberger, 1935
- Agrilus opimus Kerremans, 1897
- Agrilus opitzi Hespenheidei, 2012
- Agrilus oppositus Obenberger, 1924
- Agrilus optatus Obenberger, 1924
- Agrilus opuchtli Fisher, 1938
- Agrilus opulentus Kerremans, 1900
- Agrilus orangei Curletti, 2000
- Agrilus orangulu Jendek, 2015
- Agrilus orbatus Kerremans, 1903
- Agrilus orcus Jendek, 2021
- Agrilus orellanae Curletti, 2022
- Agrilus oreophilus Fisher, 1921
- Agrilus orestes Kerremans, 1913
- Agrilus orgetorix Obenberger, 1933
- Agrilus orgiasticus Curletti & Brûlé, 2013
- Agrilus orientis Obenberger, 1924
- Agrilus orlovi Jendek, 2021
- Agrilus ornamentifer Obenberger, 1940
- Agrilus ornatoides Jendek, 2011
- Agrilus ornatulus Horn, 1891
- Agrilus ornatus Deyrolle, 1864
- Agrilus ornithocoprus Hespenheide & Westcott, 2018
- Agrilus oromo Curletti, 2002
- Agrilus orothi Baudon, 1965
- Agrilus osburni Knull, 1936
- Agrilus ostellinoi Curletti, 2003
- Agrilus ostentator Kerremans, 1900
- Agrilus ostrinus Kerremans, 1892
- Agrilus otiosus Say, 1833
- Agrilus oudomxai Jendek, 2018
- Agrilus overlaeti Burgeon, 1941
- Agrilus owas Gory & Laporte, 1837
- Agrilus pabulator Obenberger, 1932
- Agrilus pacatus Kerremans, 1913
- Agrilus pacholatkoi Jendek, 1994
- Agrilus pachycerus Pochon, 1972
- Agrilus pacificus Thomson, 1879
- Agrilus paganettii Obenberger, 1913
- Agrilus paganus Deyrolle, 1864
- Agrilus pagdeni Fisher, 1933
- Agrilus paimpolaiseae Baudon, 1968
- Agrilus palaestes Obenberger, 1932
- Agrilus palakkadensis Seena, Anand & Shibu-Vardhanan, 2022
- Agrilus palawanensis Fisher, 1921
- Agrilus palii Baudon, 1968
- Agrilus palilogus Obenberger, 1933
- Agrilus pallon Obenberger, 1933
- Agrilus palmerleei Knull, 1944
- Agrilus paludicola Krogerus, 1922
- Agrilus pangalae Théry, 1931
- Agrilus panguanae Curletti, 2020
- Agrilus panhensis Baudon, 1968
- Agrilus pao Jendek, 2007
- Agrilus paolettae Curletti, Ribeiro & Migliore, 2016
- Agrilus papilliger Jendek, 2021
- Agrilus papuanus Gestro, 1877
- Agrilus parabductus Knull, 1954
- Agrilus paracelti Knull, 1972
- Agrilus paracuspidatus Obenberger, 1939
- Agrilus paradelphus Obenberger, 1933
- Agrilus paradiseus Obenberger, 1924
- Agrilus paradoxus Boheman, 1858
- Agrilus paraimpexus Hespenheide, 2007
- Agrilus paralleloides Jendek, 2011
- Agrilus parallelus Deyrolle, 1864
- Agrilus paramacer Hespenheide in Hespenheide & Bellamy, 2009
- Agrilus paramasculinus Champlain & Knull, 1923
- Agrilus parapupalus Curletti, 1998
- Agrilus parasimilanus Obenberger, 1933
- Agrilus parizotae Baudon, 1968
- Agrilus parkeri Knull, 1935
- Agrilus parkinsoniae Hespenheide in Hespenheide & Bellamy, 2009
- Agrilus parotites Curletti, 2018
- Agrilus parsysti Curletti, 2002
- Agrilus partimcinctus Curletti & Brûlé, 2011
- Agrilus parvati Jendek, 2021
- Agrilus parvulus Deyrolle, 1864
- Agrilus parvus Saunders, 1870
- Agrilus parvusculus Obenberger, 1936
- Agrilus passerculus Obenberger, 1935
- Agrilus patawaensis Curletti & Brûlé, 2011
- Agrilus patricius Obenberger, 1931
- Agrilus patrizzii Théry, 1927
- Agrilus pattoni Obenberger, 1933
- Agrilus pauciguttatus Saunders, 1867
- Agrilus paucipilis Obenberger, 1935
- Agrilus paulista Curletti, 2016
- Agrilus paulyi Curletti, 1997
- Agrilus pauper Deyrolle, 1864
- Agrilus pauperculus Gory, 1841
- Agrilus pausias Obenberger, 1935
- Agrilus pavidus (Fabricius, 1793)
- Agrilus pavlinae Curletti & Sakalian, 2009
- Agrilus paynali Fisher, 1938
- Agrilus pecirkai Obenberger, 1916
- Agrilus pecoudi Descarpentries & Villiers, 1963
- Agrilus pectoralis Waterhouse, 1889
- Agrilus peculiphallus Jendek, 2021
- Agrilus pediculus Curletti, 1999
- Agrilus pedroi Obenberger, 1935
- Agrilus pekinensis Obenberger, 1924
- Agrilus pellitus Curletti, 2006
- Agrilus pelops Obenberger, 1935
- Agrilus peloritanus Curletti, 2021
- Agrilus penangensis Obenberger, 1936
- Agrilus penevi Curletti & Sakalian, 2009
- Agrilus peninsularis Van Dyke, 1942
- Agrilus pensus Horn, 1891
- Agrilus perakianus Kerremans, 1900
- Agrilus perangustus Kerremans, 1897
- Agrilus peraptulus Obenberger, 1935
- Agrilus percaroides Hespenheide, 2012
- Agrilus percarus Kerremans, 1894
- Agrilus perditus Curletti & Brûlé, 2011
- Agrilus peregrinus Kiesenwetter in Kraatz & Kiesenwetter, 1879
- Agrilus pereplut Jendek, 2021
- Agrilus peresoso Curletti, 2005
- Agrilus perfectus Curletti, 2020
- Agrilus perfuga Obenberger, 1935
- Agrilus pergratus Jendek, 2018
- Agrilus pericles Curletti & Ong, 2022
- Agrilus perisi Cobos, 1986
- Agrilus perisuturalis Jendek, 2021
- Agrilus perlisensis Fisher, 1936
- Agrilus perlucidus Gory, 1841
- Agrilus perniciosellus Obenberger, 1924
- Agrilus perniciosus Deyrolle, 1864
- Agrilus perniger Obenberger, 1931
- Agrilus perparvus Obenberger, 1918
- Agrilus perpastus Curletti, 2009
- Agrilus perplexus Burmeister, 1872
- Agrilus perrieri Fairmaire, 1902
- Agrilus perrini Pic, 1905
- Agrilus perroti Descarpentries & Villiers, 1963
- Agrilus persicollis Jendek, 2021
- Agrilus persimilis Hołyński, 2018
- Agrilus persolitarius Obenberger, 1924
- Agrilus pertener Obenberger, 1935
- Agrilus pertenuis Kerremans, 1897
- Agrilus pertristis Obenberger, 1933
- Agrilus perumal Jendek, 2021
- Agrilus perun Jendek, 2021
- Agrilus perviridis Kerremans, 1894
- Agrilus pes Curletti & Brûlé, 2013
- Agrilus pescaroloi Curletti & Dutto, 1999
- Agrilus petarensis Kerremans, 1896
- Agrilus petronius Obenberger, 1933
- Agrilus pexus Kerremans, 1912
- Agrilus phaenicopterus Waterhouse, 1889
- Agrilus phallicus Curletti & Brûlé, 2011
- Agrilus phanaeus Obenberger, 1933
- Agrilus pharao Obenberger, 1923
- Agrilus phifa Jendek, 2021
- Agrilus philippinensis Fisher, 1921
- Agrilus phlegyas Obenberger, 1935
- Agrilus phoenix Obenberger, 1935
- Agrilus phorcus Obenberger, 1935
- Agrilus phoupanus Jendek, 2021,
- Agrilus picinus Fisher, 1943
- Agrilus pictipennis Gory & Laporte, 1837
- Agrilus pictithorax Obenberger, 1924
- Agrilus picturatus Jendek, 2013
- Agrilus pictus Kerremans, 1897
- Agrilus pidjinus Obenberger, 1924
- Agrilus pierrei Descarpentries & Villiers, 1963
- Agrilus pilicauda Saunders, 1874
- Agrilus piliferus Kerremans, 1897
- Agrilus pilipalipuntyuc Hołyński, 2018
- Agrilus pilipennis Obenberger, 1924
- Agrilus pilistoma Obenberger, 1924
- Agrilus piliventris Deyrolle, 1864
- Agrilus pilosellus Thomson, 1878
- Agrilus pilosicollis Fisher, 1928
- Agrilus pilosidorsis Obenberger, 1924
- Agrilus pilosotibialis Descarpentries, 1958
- Agrilus pilosovittatus Saunders, 1873
- Agrilus pilosus Waterhouse, 1889
- Agrilus pimai Jendek, 2021
- Agrilus pimenteli Théry, 1947
- Agrilus pinedai Curletti, 2020
- Agrilus pinguis Kerremans, 1897
- Agrilus pinhadaensis Obenberger, 1932
- Agrilus pinii Gestro, 1877
- Agrilus pinlampo Curletti, Ribeiro, & Migliore, 2013
- Agrilus pirilampo Curletti, Ribeiro & Migliore, 2013
- Agrilus pisander Obenberger, 1933
- Agrilus piscis Gory, 1841
- Agrilus pisinoe Gory, 1841
- Agrilus pistaciophagus Alexeev & Kulinitsh, 1962
- Agrilus placens Kerremans, 1897
- Agrilus placidus Kerremans, 1894
- Agrilus plagiatus Ganglbauer, 1890
- Agrilus planatus Waterhouse, 1889
- Agrilus planchardi Descarpentries & Villiers, 1963
- Agrilus planipennis Fairmaire, 1888 — emerald ash borer
- Agrilus planus Jendek, 2021
- Agrilus plasoni Obenberger, 1917
- Agrilus plavilstshikovi Alexeev in Alexeev & Volkovitsh, 1989
- Agrilus plebejus Deyrolle, 1864
- Agrilus plecotus Curletti & Brûlé, 2011
- Agrilus pleuralis Jendek, 2011
- Agrilus pleurostigmus Jendek, 2011
- Agrilus plicaticollis Kerremans, 1888
- Agrilus plicatus Kerremans, 1903
- Agrilus pliculipennis Obenberger, 1940
- Agrilus pluraensis Juárez & González, 2017
- Agrilus pluridens Jendek, 2018
- Agrilus plurifrons Jendek & Nakládal, 2018
- Agrilus plurimus Curletti, 2020
- Agrilus plutonicellus Thomson, 1879
- Agrilus plutonius Obenberger, 1935
- Agrilus pluvialis Curletti, 1996
- Agrilus pluvius Jendek, 2013
- Agrilus poecilus Obenberger, 1923
- Agrilus poeta Obenberger, 1936
- Agrilus pohnertianus Obenberger, 1935
- Agrilus poirieri Curletti & Brûlé, 2011
- Agrilus polinae Curletti & Sakalian, 2009
- Agrilus politus (Say, 1825)
- Agrilus pollux Obenberger, 1935
- Agrilus polyctor Obenberger, 1931
- Agrilus polydeukes Curletti & Ong, 2022
- Agrilus polyphemus Curletti & Goergen, 2011
- Agrilus pondo Obenberger, 1935
- Agrilus popovi Curletti & Sakalian, 2009
- Agrilus porewit Jendek, 2021
- Agrilus porthos Jendek & Grebennikov, 2018
- Agrilus portonovencis Kerremans, 1903
- Agrilus posticalis Gory & Laporte, 1837
- Agrilus postulator Kerremans, 1897
- Agrilus potens Kerremans, 1912
- Agrilus pouesseli Baudon, 1960
- Agrilus praecipuus Kerremans, 1897
- Agrilus praedae Fisher, 1943
- Agrilus praelucens Kerremans, 1897
- Agrilus praemitis Curletti, 2009
- Agrilus praetextus Bourgoin, 1922
- Agrilus praetor Obenberger, 1931
- Agrilus pratensis (Ratzeburg, 1837)
- Agrilus pravus Kerremans, 1912
- Agrilus prepsli Curletti, 2019
- Agrilus presbys Jendek in Jendek & Grebennikov, 2011
- Agrilus presli Obenberger, 1932
- Agrilus pretiosissimus Kerremans, 1899
- Agrilus pretiosus Deyrolle, 1864
- Agrilus preyssleri Obenberger, 1933
- Agrilus priamus Kerremans, 1912
- Agrilus princeps Jendek & Grebennikov, 2018
- Agrilus prionurus Chevrolat, 1838
- Agrilus priscus Obenberger, 1935
- Agrilus prismaticus Kerremans, 1897
- Agrilus proaemulus Obenberger, 1935
- Agrilus probabilis Curletti, 2020
- Agrilus probus Kerremans, 1897
- Agrilus prodigiosus Fisher, 1933
- Agrilus proditor Obenberger, 1917
- Agrilus profugellus Thomson, 1878
- Agrilus prolaticollis Jendek, 2021
- Agrilus prolatus Jendek, 2021
- Agrilus prolectus Obenberger, 1935
- Agrilus prolixus Kerremans, 1897
- Agrilus propolis Curletti, Migliore & Casari, 2022
- Agrilus proserpinae Curletti, 2010
- Agrilus prosopidis Fisher, 1928
- Agrilus prosternalis Jendek, 2011
- Agrilus prosternidens Obenberger, 1935
- Agrilus protectus Curletti, 2000
- Agrilus protenor Obenberger, 1924
- Agrilus proteus Abeille de Perrin, 1893
- Agrilus protoproditor Jendek, 2021
- Agrilus provincialis Curletti, 1998
- Agrilus proximulus Fisher, 1933
- Agrilus proximus Saunders, 1870
- Agrilus prudens Kerremans, 1897
- Agrilus pruinosus Chevrolat, 1838
- Agrilus przewalskii Obenberger, 1936
- Agrilus pseudinamoenus Descarpentries & Villiers, 1967
- Agrilus pseudoambiguus Jendek, 2013
- Agrilus pseudobscuricollis Jendek, 2007
- Agrilus pseudoconstantini Alexeev, 1981
- Agrilus pseudocoryli Fisher, 1928
- Agrilus pseudocyaneus Kiesenwetter, 1857
- Agrilus pseudofallax Frost, 1923
- Agrilus pseudograminis Jendek, 2007
- Agrilus pseudoharlequin Jendek in Jendek & Grebennikov, 2009
- Agrilus pseudolimoniastri Cobos, 1968
- Agrilus pseudolituratus Descarpentries, 1959
- Agrilus pseudolubopetri Jendek & Chamorro, 2012
- Agrilus pseudonubeculosus Descarpentries, 1959
- Agrilus pseudoostrinus Jendek, 2000
- Agrilus pseudoparagrilus Obenberger, 1933
- Agrilus pseudopurpuratus Descarpentries & Bruneau de Miré, 1963
- Agrilus pseudosallei Hespenheide in Westcott, et al., 2008
- Agrilus pseudosericans Obenberger, 1936
- Agrilus pseudosimilanus Obenberger, 1933
- Agrilus pseudoussuricola Alexeev, 1979
- Agrilus psoglav Jendek, 2021
- Agrilus pterochlorus Obenberger, 1924
- Agrilus pterostigma Obenberger, 1927
- Agrilus puberulus Deyrolle, 1864
- Agrilus pubescens Fisher, 1928
- Agrilus pubifrons Fisher, 1928
- Agrilus pubinotus Jendek, 2018
- Agrilus pubiventris Kiewsenwetter, 1857
- Agrilus pubornatus Jendek, 2001
- Agrilus pudendus Curletti & Brûlé, 2014
- Agrilus pudens Kerremans, 1897
- Agrilus pudoratus Curletti, 2006
- Agrilus puellus Gory & Laporte, 1837
- Agrilus puerilis Kerremans, 1897
- Agrilus pugionellus Thomson, 1879
- Agrilus pugionifer Schaufuss, 1877
- Agrilus pugionifer Schaufuss, 1877
- Agrilus pujoli Descarpentries, 1963
- Agrilus pulchellus Bland, 1865
- Agrilus pulcher Saunders, 1874
- Agrilus pulex Curletti & Bellamy, 2005
- Agrilus puli Jendek, 2021
- Agrilus pullatus Curletti & Ong, 2023
- Agrilus pullulus Waterhouse, 1889
- Agrilus pullus Jendek, 2021
- Agrilus pulvereus Abeille de Perrin, 1895
- Agrilus pulverosus Chevrolat, 1838
- Agrilus pumi Jendek, 2011
- Agrilus pumilio Curletti, 2010
- Agrilus pumilo Curletti, 2011
- Agrilus puncak Jendek & Nakládal, 2019
- Agrilus punctatissimus Waterhouse, 1889
- Agrilus puncticeps LeConte, 1860
- Agrilus punctifrons Deyrolle, 1864
- Agrilus puniceus Kerremans, 1897
- Agrilus pupalinus Curletti, 1998
- Agrilus pupalus Obenberger, 1935
- Agrilus pupillus Deyrolle, 1864
- Agrilus purpuratus (Klug, 1829)
- Agrilus purpurescens Kerremans, 1892
- Agrilus purpurifrons Deyrolle, 1864
- Agrilus purus Kerremans, 1900
- Agrilus pusillesculptus Obenberger, 1940
- Agrilus pustulatus Curletti, 2020
- Agrilus putillus Say, 1833
- Agrilus putzeysi Obenberger, 1933
- Agrilus pwanii Curletti 2019
- Agrilus pygaera Obenberger, 1931
- Agrilus pylades Curletti & Ong, 2022
- Agrilus pylnovi Obenberger, 1933
- Agrilus pyoti Curletti, 2000
- Agrilus pyritosus Kerremans, 1900
- Agrilus pyropygus Thomson, 1878
- Agrilus pyrosurus Gory & Laporte, 1837
- Agrilus qiang Jendek, 2011
- Agrilus qinling Jendek, 2000
- Agrilus qinlingcola Jendek, 2011
- Agrilus qom Jendek & Grebennikov, 2019
- Agrilus quadraticollis Fairmaire, 1902
- Agrilus quadricostatus Waterhouse, 1889
- Agrilus quadriguttatellus Thomson, 1879
- Agrilus quadriguttatus Gory, 1841
- Agrilus quadriimpressus Ziegler, 1845
- Agrilus quadrimaculatus Waterhouse, 1889
- Agrilus quadrinotatus Gory, 1841
- Agrilus quadriplagiatus Fisher, 1921
- Agrilus quadripunctatus Deyrolle, 1864
- Agrilus quadrisignatus Marseul, 1866
- Agrilus quadrispilotus Obenberger, 1935
- Agrilus quadristigmula Obenberger, 1936
- Agrilus quadruplex Curletti & Dutto, 1999
- Agrilus quaestionis Obenberger, 1931
- Agrilus quaestor Obenberger, 1931
- Agrilus quattuordecimsignatus Obenberger, 1935
- Agrilus queenslandiae Obenberger, 1936
- Agrilus queenslandicus Curletti, 2008
- Agrilus quentini Descarpentries & Villiers, 1963
- Agrilus quercicola Fisher, 1928
- Agrilus quercus Schaeffer, 1905
- Agrilus quetzalcoatli Fisher, 1938
- Agrilus quietus Kerremans, 1897
- Agrilus quilmesinus Obenberger, 1933
- Agrilus quirosi Hołyński, 2018
- Agrilus quito Curletti, 2015
- Agrilus raapi Kerremans, 1900
- Agrilus rabaticus Théry, 1930
- Agrilus radegast Jendek, 2021
- Agrilus radiolus Kerremans, 1913
- Agrilus rafaeli Curletti, 2019
- Agrilus raffrayi Thomson, 1879
- Agrilus raphelisi Obenberger, 1923
- Agrilus rappi Curletti, 2016
- Agrilus rarestriatus Curletti, Ribeiro & Migliore, 2013
- Agrilus rarogoides Jendek, 2021
- Agrilus rarus Kerremans, 1897
- Agrilus rastellii Curletti, 1998
- Agrilus ratus Waterhouse, 1889
- Agrilus raventazonus Fisher, 1929
- Agrilus recellens Obenberger, 1935
- Agrilus recticollis Jendek, 2011
- Agrilus rectus Deyrolle, 1864
- Agrilus redtenbacheri Obenberger, 1933
- Agrilus refectus Waterhouse, 1889
- Agrilus reginensis Curletti & Brûlé, 2014
- Agrilus regius Curletti, 1998
- Agrilus regulus Obenberger, 1935
- Agrilus reichardti Obenberger, 1935
- Agrilus reimoseri Obenberger, 1933
- Agrilus relegatoides Novak, 2003
- Agrilus relegatus Curletti, 1990
- Agrilus reliquus Kerremans, 1903
- Agrilus remuneratus Obenberger, 1935
- Agrilus remus Obenberger, 1935
- Agrilus repercussus Kerremans, 1893
- Agrilus ressli Jendek & Nakládal, 2019
- Agrilus restrictus Waterhouse, 1889
- Agrilus rex Jendek & Grebennikov, 2018
- Agrilus reynoldsi Obenberger, 1935
- Agrilus rhodesi Obenberger, 1935
- Agrilus rhoos Królik & Niehuis, 2003
- Agrilus rhopalocerus Pochon, 1972
- Agrilus rhusphagus Curletti & Ong, 2022
- Agrilus ribbei Kiesenwetter in Kraatz & Kiesenwetter, 1879
- Agrilus rebeiroi Curletti & Migliore
- Agrilus ribesi Schaefer, 1946
- Agrilus richardae Descarpentries & Villiers, 1963
- Agrilus rifkindi Hespenheide in Hespenheide & Bellamy, 2009
- Agrilus rilliardi Baudon, 1988
- Agrilus rimosicollis Kerremans, 1897
- Agrilus ritavillensis Baudon, 1968
- Agrilus rivalieri Descarpentries & Villiers, 1963
- Agrilus robustipenis Jendek, 2000
- Agrilus rockefelleri Cazier, 1951
- Agrilus rodzjankoi Obenberger, 1933
- Agrilus rokuyai Kurosawa, 1976
- Agrilus rolciki Jendek in Jendek & Grebennikov, 2009
- Agrilus romanovi Obenberger, 1935
- Agrilus romulus Obenberger, 1935
- Agrilus rondoni Baudon, 1968
- Agrilus roroensis Gestro, 1877
- Agrilus rosanti Curletti & Brûlé, 2011
- Agrilus rosazzae Curletti, 2003
- Agrilus roscidellinus Obenberger, 1935
- Agrilus roscidiformis Obenberger, 1916
- Agrilus roscidinus Obenberger, 1923
- Agrilus roscidoides Abielle de Perrin, 1909
- Agrilus roscidulus Abeille de Perrin, 1897
- Agrilus roscidus Kiesenwetter, 1857
- Agrilus rosei Niehuis & Bernhard, 2005
- Agrilus roseus Curletti, 2002
- Agrilus rossanae Curletti, 2005
- Agrilus rossii Curletti, 1997
- Agrilus rotundipennis Fisher, 1921
- Agrilus rotundus Curletti, 1998
- Agrilus rougeoti Descarpentries & Villiers, 1963
- Agrilus rourei Curletti & Brûlé, 2023
- Agrilus rousselatae Baudon, 1968
- Agrilus rubensteini CHamorro & Jendek, 2014
- Agrilus rubescens Curletti, 1998
- Agrilus rubicundus Kerremans, 1913
- Agrilus rubifrons Deyrolle, 1864
- Agrilus rubricapillus Curletti & Pütz, 2023
- Agrilus rubrofuscus Curletti & Brûlé, 2013
- Agrilus rubroniger Hespenheide, 1979
- Agrilus rubronigromaculatus Curletti & Brûlé, 2015
- Agrilus rubrovittatus (Waterhouse, 1889)
- Agrilus rudicollis Alexeev, 1981
- Agrilus rudidorsis Obenberger, 1935
- Agrilus rudissimus Obenberger, 1935
- Agrilus rudolphi Obenberger, 1935
- Agrilus ruficollis (Fabricius, 1787) — rednecked cane borer
- Agrilus ruficornis Curletti, 1997
- Agrilus rufobrunneus Fisher, 1933
- Agrilus rufocentralis Thomson, 1878
- Agrilus rufopictus Kerremans, 1899
- Agrilus rufuscapitae Curletti, 2005
- Agrilus ruginosus (Waterhouse, 1889)
- Agrilus rugiplumbus Cobos, 1964
- Agrilus rugivertex Obenberger, 1935
- Agrilus rugosicollis Blanchard, 1846
- Agrilus rusalka Jendek, 2021
- Agrilus rugosus Waterhouse, 1889
- Agrilus rustenburgensis Obenberger, 1939
- Agrilus ruteri Descarpentries & Villiers, 1963
- Agrilus ruzzieri Curletti, 2016
- Agrilus rwandae Curletti & Goergen, 2011
- Agrilus sacer Kerremans, 1900
- Agrilus sachalinensis Obenberger, 1935
- Agrilus sachalinicola Obenberger, 1940
- Agrilus sadahiroi Tôyama, 1987
- Agrilus saganaensis Obenberger, 1935
- Agrilus sagax Kerremans, 1912
- Agrilus sagittarius Curletti, 1997
- Agrilus sagittifer Jendek, 2011
- Agrilus sahelicus Curletti, 1998
- Agrilus sahyadriensis Seena, Anan & Shibu-Vardhanan, 2022
- Agrilus sainthilairei Obenberger, 1933
- Agrilus sainvali Curletti, 1997
- Agrilus salakot Jendek, 2018
- Agrilus saleius Obenberger, 1935
- Agrilus salicis Frivaldszky, 1877
- Agrilus salicivola Kurosawa, 1963
- Agrilus salisburyensis Obenberger, 1931
- Agrilus sallei Dugès, 1878
- Agrilus salmo Obenberger, 1935
- Agrilus salsus Curletti, 2022
- Agrilus saltensis Kerremans, 1903
- Agrilus salviaphilos Manley, 1979
- Agrilus salweenensis Stebbing, 1914
- Agrilus samai Magnani, 1995
- Agrilus saman Jendek, 2021
- Agrilus samaricus Curletti & Vayssières, 2007
- Agrilus samawangensis Fisher, 1930
- Agrilus samboides Fisher, 1930
- Agrilus samoensis Blair, 1928
- Agrilus samuelsoni Tôyama, 1985
- Agrilus samuelsonicus Curletti, 2006
- Agrilus samyi Baudon, 1968
- Agrilus sanatus Obenberger, 1935
- Agrilus sanchezae Hespenheide, 1990
- Agrilus sandakanus Obenberger, 1924
- Agrilus sangadzinus Théry, 1934
- Agrilus sanguineus Curletti, 1997
- Agrilus sanjosensis Fisher, 1938
- Agrilus sannio Curletti, 1997
- Agrilus sanpauloi Bellamy, 1998
- Agrilus sapindi Knull, 1938
- Agrilus sapphirinus Jendek & Chamorro, 2012
- Agrilus saraswati Jendek, 2011
- Agrilus sarawakensis Hoscheck, 1931
- Agrilus sarawakianus Jendek, 2021
- Agrilus satipo Juárez-Noé, González-Coronado & Curletti, 2024
- Agrilus satoi Kurosawa, 1954
- Agrilus saturnus Curletti, 1998
- Agrilus satyrus Curletti, 2006
- Agrilus saucius Curletti, 2002
- Agrilus saudita Curletti, 1998
- Agrilus saundersianus Obenberger, 1924
- Agrilus saundersii Murray, 1868
- Agrilus sausai Jendek, 2001
- Agrilus saussurei Obenberger, 1933
- Agrilus sauteri Kerremans, 1912
- Agrilus savanae Curletti, 2000
- Agrilus sayi Saunders, 1870
- Agrilus scaber Jendek, 2021
- Agrilus scabiosus Thomson, 1878
- Agrilus scabrosus Waterhouse, 1889
- Agrilus sceptuchus Obenberger, 1933
- Agrilus scerbakovi Obenberger, 1935
- Agrilus schillhammeri Jendek, 2011
- Agrilus schmidli Curletti, 2005
- Agrilus schmidtgoebeli Obenberger, 1935
- Agrilus scholtzi Curletti, 2000
- Agrilus schoutedeni Kerremans, 1912
- Agrilus schreineri Obenberger, 1933
- Agrilus schultzei Kerremans, 1907
- Agrilus schwerdtfegeri Obenberger, 1957
- Agrilus scitulus Horn, 1891
- Agrilus scitus Obenberger, 1935
- Agrilus scopiazon Obenberger, 1933
- Agrilus scottoi Curletti & Dutto, 2017
- Agrilus scrobicollis Thomson, 1879
- Agrilus sculpturatus Kerremans, 1897
- Agrilus scurra Curletti, 2002
- Agrilus scutatus Curletti, 1998
- Agrilus scutellaris Deyrolle, 1864
- Agrilus scythicus Królik & Janicki, 2005
- Agrilus sectus Jendek, 2021
- Agrilus sedlaceki Curletti, 2006
- Agrilus sedonensis Baudon, 1968
- Agrilus sedyi Obenberger, 1933
- Agrilus seiunctus Curletti & Dutto, 1999
- Agrilus sejeani Baudon, 1968
- Agrilus sekerai Obenberger, 1933
- Agrilus sekii Ohmomo, 2004
- Agrilus sellatus Kerremans, 1898
- Agrilus semang Jendek, 2021
- Agrilus semarangi Obenberger, 1931
- Agrilus semenovi (Obenberger, 1931)
- Agrilus semerdjievi Curletti & Sakalian, 2009
- Agrilus semiaeneus Deyrolle, 1864
- Agrilus semiaurovittatus Kurosawa, 1954
- Agrilus semicauducus Jendek in Jendek & Grebennikov, 2009
- Agrilus semicinctus Curletti, 2010
- Agrilus semifossus Fairmaire, 1898
- Agrilus seminudus Curletti, 2006
- Agrilus semiopacus Fisher, 1933
- Agrilus semipubescens Fisher, 1921
- Agrilus semirjeciae Obenberger, 1936
- Agrilus semirufus Curletti, 2019
- Agrilus semperi Saunders, 1874
- Agrilus senegalensis Gory & Laporte, 1837
- Agrilus senilis Kerremans, 1914
- Agrilus senior Curletti, 2018
- Agrilus senohi Tôyama, 1988
- Agrilus sensitivus Kerremans, 1897
- Agrilus sentis Jendek, 2011
- Agrilus sepulchralis Deyrolle, 1864
- Agrilus seramensis Jendek & Chamorro, 2012
- Agrilus serenae Curletti, 2002
- Agrilus serialis Curletti & Brûlé, 2013
- Agrilus seriatus Curletti & Brûlé, 2011
- Agrilus sericans Kiesenwetter, 1857
- Agrilus sericarius Abeille de Perrin, 1897
- Agrilus sericeipilis Obenberger, 1935
- Agrilus sericeiplagis Obenberger, 1935
- Agrilus seroli Baudon, 1968
- Agrilus serratus Jendek, 2015
- Agrilus servius Obenberger, 1935
- Agrilus servus Curletti & Dutto, 1999
- Agrilus sesostris Fisher, 1929
- Agrilus setipes Chevrolat, 1838
- Agrilus severini Obenberger, 1933
- Agrilus sexflavoguttatellus Thomson, 1879
- Agrilus sexguttatellus Thomson, 1879
- Agrilus sexguttatus (Thunberg, 1789)
- Agrilus sexmaculatus Waterhouse, 1889
- Agrilus sexnotatus Gory & Laporte, 1837
- Agrilus sexpunctatus Deyrolle, 1864
- Agrilus sexsignatus Fisher, 1921
- Agrilus shaowensis Jendek, 1994
- Agrilus sharpi Obenberger, 1933
- Agrilus shashamboe Kurosawa, 1963
- Agrilus shaumaae Descarpentries & Villiers, 1963
- Agrilus shibatai Kurosawa, 1964
- Agrilus shimabarensis Ohmomo, 2011
- Agrilus shoemakeri Knull, 1938
- Agrilus siam Jendek, 2021
- Agrilus siamensis Tôyama, 1987
- Agrilus siberuticola Jendek, 2018
- Agrilus sibiricolus Obenberger, 1924
- Agrilus sibiricus Obenberger, 1912
- Agrilus sicardi (Théry, 1912)
- Agrilus sicariellus Thomson, 1879
- Agrilus sichuanus Jendek, 2011
- Agrilus siemreap Jendek, 2021
- Agrilus sierrae Van Dyke, 1923
- Agrilus sigillum Curletti & Brûlé, 2013
- Agrilus signatus Waterhouse, 1889
- Agrilus signipes Jendek, 2018
- Agrilus sikhiav Jendek & Grebennikov, 2018
- Agrilus sikkimensis Obenberger, 1928
- Agrilus silantjevi Obenberger, 1931
- Agrilus silentvalleyensis Seena, Anand & Shibu-Vardhanan, 202
- Agrilus silvanoi Curletti & Nakládal
- Agrilus silvanus Curletti, 1996
- Agrilus silvaticus Curletti, 2002
- Agrilus silvestrii Obenberger, 1935
- Agrilus silviettae Curletti, 2005
- Agrilus simbirensis Obenberger, 1925
- Agrilus similanus Obenberger, 1933
- Agrilus similaris Curletti, 2018
- Agrilus similis Curletti & Brûlé, 2013
- Agrilus similiter Curletti & Brûlé, 2014
- Agrilus simillipictus Obenberger, 1924
- Agrilus simonellus Curletti, 2011
- Agrilus simoni Kerremans, 1896
- Agrilus simoninae Descarpentries & Villiers, 1963
- Agrilus simplex Kerremans, 1894
- Agrilus simplicellus Thomson, 1879
- Agrilus simplicicollis Waterhouse, 1889
- Agrilus simulans Waterhouse, 1889
- Agrilus simulator Curletti & Brûlé, 2011
- Agrilus sincerus Kerremans, 1897
- Agrilus sinensis Thomson, 1879
- Agrilus singkaraensis Fisher, 1926
- Agrilus singularis Kerremans, 1900
- Agrilus sinuatus (Olivier, 1790)
- Agrilus sinuosus Jendek & Grebennikov, 2018
- Agrilus siren Gory, 1841
- Agrilus siskai Jendek, 2011
- Agrilus sitiens Curletti, 2000
- Agrilus skrlandti Obenberger, 1933
- Agrilus skrzak Jendek, 2021
- Agrilus slami Curletti & Brûlé, 2015
- Agrilus smaragdifrons Ganglbauer, 1890
- Agrilus smaragdinus Solsky, 1875
- Agrilus smatanai Jendek, 2007
- Agrilus smetanai Jendek, 2011
- Agrilus snowi Fall, 1905
- Agrilus sobrinus Waterhouse, 1889
- Agrilus socialis Waterhouse, 1889
- Agrilus sodalis Waterhouse, 1889
- Agrilus solemnis Obenberger, 1924
- Agrilus solers Curletti, 1997
- Agrilus solieri Gory & Laporte, 1837
- Agrilus solitarius Curletti, 2012
- Agrilus sollicitus Curletti, 2002
- Agrilus solus Obenberger, 1935
- Agrilus somalicus Kerremans, 1896
- Agrilus somalus Curletti, 1998
- Agrilus sommailae Baudon, 1965
- Agrilus somniculosus Obenberger, 1935
- Agrilus somnon Jendek, 2001
- Agrilus somsanithi Baudon, 1965
- Agrilus somsavathi Baudon, 1968
- Agrilus songkran Jendek, 2021
- Agrilus sorciellus Obenberger, 1932
- Agrilus sordidans Obenberger, 1931
- Agrilus sordidatus Obenberger, 1923
- Agrilus sordidulus Obenberger, 1917
- Agrilus soricellus Thomson, 1878
- Agrilus sospes Lewis, 1893
- Agrilus soudeki Obenberger, 1926
- Agrilus souliei Jendek, 1994
- Agrilus soulieri Baudon, 1968
- Agrilus souvannavongsi Baudon, 1968
- Agrilus sparsus Waterhouse, 1889
- Agrilus spathulatus (Obenberger, 1931)
- Agrilus spathulicornis Obenberger, 1935
- Agrilus spathulifer Jendek, 2011
- Agrilus speciosus Waterhouse, 1889
- Agrilus spectabilis Kerremans, 1895
- Agrilus sperator Obenberger, 1931
- Agrilus sperkii Solsky, 1873
- Agrilus spesivcevi Obenberger, 1927
- Agrilus sphenopterus Jendek, 2017
- Agrilus spiculatum Curletti & Brûlé, 2014
- Agrilus spiculipenis Jendek in Jendek & Grebennikov, 2009
- Agrilus spinamajor Chevrolat, 1838
- Agrilus spinellifer Obenberger, 1924
- Agrilus spineus Jendek & Chamorro, 2012
- Agrilus spinicaudatus Waterhouse, 1889
- Agrilus spiniger Eschscholtz, 1822
- Agrilus spinipennis Lewis, 1893
- Agrilus spinipes Deyrolle, 1864
- Agrilus spiralis Jendek, 2021
- Agrilus spiridion Kerremans, 1913
- Agrilus spissus Waterhouse, 1889
- Agrilus splendens Kerremans, 1897
- Agrilus splendidipodex Thomson, 1878
- Agrilus spurcites Thomson, 1879
- Agrilus spurcus (Théry, 1905)
- Agrilus squaliformis Thomson, 1878
- Agrilus squalus Waterhouse, 1889
- Agrilus squamulatus Waterhouse, 1889
- Agrilus srogli Obenberger, 1932
- Agrilus stellatus Waterhouse, 1889
- Agrilus stempfferi Descarpentries & Villiers, 1963
- Agrilus stenachon Obenberger, 1933
- Agrilus steppicus Curletti, 2011
- Agrilus sternocarinatus Jendek, 2021
- Agrilus stevensoniellus Obenberger, 1935
- Agrilus stigma Jendek, 2011
- Agrilus stigmatus Jendek, 2021
- Agrilus stigmula Jendek & Nakládal, 2017
- Agrilus stigmulifer Jendek & Nakládal, 2017
- Agrilus stoneae Baudon, 1968
- Agrilus strandelinus Obenberger, 1936
- Agrilus strandi Obenberger, 1918
- Agrilus strandianus Obenberger, 1933
- Agrilus strbai Jendek, 2015
- Agrilus strephon Obenberger, 1933
- Agrilus striativentris Waterhouse, 1889
- Agrilus striatocollis Kerremans, 1892
- Agrilus striatus Curletti, 2006
- Agrilus strigifer Waterhouse, 1889
- Agrilus strigifrons Waterhouse, 1889
- Agrilus strigosus Kerremans, 1897
- Agrilus strigulioides Obenberger, 1932
- Agrilus striolatus Kerremans, 1899
- Agrilus strombus Obenberger, 1933
- Agrilus strophius Obenberger, 1933
- Agrilus stultus Curletti, 2022
- Agrilus suahelicus Obenberger, 1935
- Agrilus suavis Kerremans, 1897
- Agrilus subaeneus Kerremans, 1898
- Agrilus subapicalis Kerremans, 1898
- Agrilus subauratus Gebler, 1833
- Agrilus subazureus Kerremans, 1899
- Agrilus subcinctus Gory, 1841
- Agrilus subcongener Kerremans, 1899
- Agrilus subconsularis Kerremans, 1900
- Agrilus subcornutus Deyrolle, 1864
- Agrilus subcostatus Waterhouse, 1889
- Agrilus subcuneiformis Kurosawa, 1954
- Agrilus subcurtulus Kerremans, 1899
- Agrilus subdebilis Kerremans, 1899
- Agrilus subdorsalis Kerremans, 1899
- Agrilus subelongatus Kerremans, 1899
- Agrilus suberraticus Kerremans, 1903
- Agrilus subfasciatellus Obenberger, 1936
- Agrilus subfrontalis Kerremans, 1903
- Agrilus subgravidus Curletti, 1998
- Agrilus subgriseus Kerremans, 1898
- Agrilus subguttatus Waterhouse, 1889
- Agrilus subinflatus Kerremans, 1899
- Agrilus sublateralis Waterhouse, 1889
- Agrilus submendicus Obenberger, 1931
- Agrilus subnitidus Kerremans, 1898
- Agrilus subnubilis Obenberger, 1935
- Agrilus subornatus Kerremans, 1900
- Agrilus subpyropygus Kerremans, 1900
- Agrilus subrobustus Saunders, 1873
- Agrilus subrugosus Kerremans, 1899
- Agrilus subsignatus Fåhraeus in Boheman, 1851
- Agrilus subspinosus Fisher, 1921
- Agrilus subtenuis Kerremans, 1906
- Agrilus subtilipilis Obenberger, 1940
- Agrilus subtrifasciatus Deyrolle, 1864
- Agrilus subtropicus Schaeffer, 1905
- Agrilus subvalidus Kerremans, 1900
- Agrilus subvestitus Deyrolle, 1864
- Agrilus subviridis Fisher, 1921
- Agrilus subvittatus Fisher, 1921
- Agrilus sudai Kurosawa, 1985
- Agrilus suensoni Obenberger, 1940
- Agrilus sugiurai Jendek, 2007
- Agrilus sugurovi Obenberger, 1931
- Agrilus sukhothai Hołyński, 2019
- Agrilus sulcatulus Chevrolat, 1835
- Agrilus sulci Obenberger, 1932
- Agrilus sulcicollis Lacordaire in Boisduval & Lacordaire, 1835
- Agrilus sulcifer Abeille de Perrin, 1895
- Agrilus sulcifrons Fåhraeus in Boheman, 1851
- Agrilus sulcinotus Jendek, 2007
- Agrilus sulcipennis Solier, 1849
- Agrilus sulphurifer Burmeister, 1872
- Agrilus sultan Jendek, 2021
- Agrilus sumatrae Obenberger, 1922
- Agrilus sumbuanus Kerremans, 1898
- Agrilus sumptuosissimus Obenberger, 1932
- Agrilus sunanambu Jendek, 2021
- Agrilus sunderbanicola Hołyński, 2018
- Agrilus sundholmi Curletti, 2009
- Agrilus surdisquamis Obenberger, 1931
- Agrilus surrages Obenberger, 1935
- Agrilus surrubrensis Obenberger, 1917
- Agrilus suspiciosus Kerremans, 1897
- Agrilus suturaalba Deyrolle, 1864
- Agrilus suturalineatus Thomson, 1879
- Agrilus suturalis Deyrolle, 1864
- Agrilus suturicuspidatus Jendek, 2007
- Agrilus suturisignatus Obenberger, 1924
- Agrilus suturistriatus Jendek, 2017
- Agrilus suvorovi Obenberger, 1935
- Agrilus suzukii Kurosawa, 1985
- Agrilus svarog Jendek, 2021
- Agrilus swifti Curletti, 2006
- Agrilus sylvestris Deyrolle, 1864
- Agrilus sylviae Niehuis, 1992
- Agrilus syndici Curletti, 1998
- Agrilus syrdarjensis Obenberger, 1928
- Agrilus syrphoides Jendek, 2021
- Agrilus syrphus Descarpentries & Villiers, 1963
- Agrilus tabaci Kerremans, 1896
- Agrilus tabogaensis Fisher, 1938
- Agrilus taciturnus Deyrolle, 1864
- Agrilus tacitus Kerremans, 1894
- Agrilus taediosus Curletti, Ribeiro & Migliore, 2013
- Agrilus taeniatus Chevrolat, 1835
- Agrilus tahanae Fisher, 1933
- Agrilus tai Jendek, 2011
- Agrilus taii Curletti, 2019
- Agrilus taiwanensis Kurosawa, 1954
- Agrilus takaharui Curletti & Ong, 2022
- Agrilus takahashii Tôyama, 1988
- Agrilus takana Fisher, 1925
- Agrilus talthybius Obenberger, 1933
- Agrilus tamarindi Curletti, 2018
- Agrilus tanai Curletti, 2021
- Agrilus tandapianus Curletti, 2015
- Agrilus tantillulus Obenberger, 1936
- Agrilus taoi (Tôyama, 1987)
- Agrilus tarae Bellamy, 1999
- Agrilus tardulus Obenberger, 1924
- Agrilus tarrascus Dugès, 1891
- Agrilus taveuniensis Théry, 1934
- Agrilus tayabensis Fisher, 1921
- Agrilus taylori Théry, 1947
- Agrilus tazoei Kurosawa, 1985
- Agrilus tebinganus Obenberger, 1924
- Agrilus teicuae Fisher, 1938
- Agrilus tejupilcoensis Fisher, 1933
- Agrilus telaemenes Obenberger, 1933
- Agrilus telawensis Fisher, 1935
- Agrilus telekii Gebhardt, 1926
- Agrilus telpuchtli Fisher, 1938
- Agrilus tembeling Jendek, 2021
- Agrilus temeratus Waterhouse, 1889
- Agrilus tempestivoides Jendek, 2021
- Agrilus tempestivus Lewis, 1893
- Agrilus templaris Curletti & Brûlé, 2013
- Agrilus temporalis Waterhouse, 1889
- Agrilus tenebricosus Kerremans, 1897
- Agrilus tenellus Fåhraeus in Boheman, 1851
- Agrilus tenuigaster Jendek, 2021
- Agrilus tenuisculptus Obenberger, 1933
- Agrilus tenuissimus Abeille de Perrin, 1891
- Agrilus teocchii Curletti, 1998
- Agrilus terentius Obenberger, 1933
- Agrilus terminatus Thomson, 1879
- Agrilus ternatensis Obenberger, 1924
- Agrilus terracotta Jendek, 2011
- Agrilus terraereginae Blackburn, 1892
- Agrilus tersus Kerremans, 1897
- Agrilus tertouroulti Curletti & Brûlé, 2023
- Agrilus tervureni Curletti, 1997
- Agrilus tesselatus Jendek, 2013
- Agrilus tessmanni Curletti, 1994
- Agrilus testor Kerremans, 1900
- Agrilus tetrastictus Bourgoin, 1925
- Agrilus tezcatlipocai Fisher, 1938
- Agrilus thailandicus Jendek, 2017
- Agrilus thalassinus Deyrolle, 1864
- Agrilus thaumastus Obenberger, 1933
- Agrilus thavil Jendek, 2021
- Agrilus theodasae Baudon, 1968
- Agrilus theodasi Baudon, 1968
- Agrilus therondi Descarpentries & Villiers, 1963
- Agrilus thevadensis Baudon, 1968
- Agrilus thianshanskii Obenberger, 1933
- Agrilus thibetanus Obenberger, 1928
- Agrilus thomasi Baudon, 1965
- Agrilus thomasseti Théry, 1928
- Agrilus thoracellus Gory & Laporte, 1837
- Agrilus thoracicus Gory & Laporte, 1837
- Agrilus thoraciplagis Obenberger, 1935
- Agrilus thylacinus Curletti, 2001
- Agrilus tiacapanae Fisher, 1938
- Agrilus tiberius Obenberger, 1933
- Agrilus tiburui Curletti & Brûlé, 2023
- Agrilus tiflisicus Obenberger, 1936
- Agrilus tika Jendek, 2021
- Agrilus timidus Kerremans, 1897
- Agrilus timorosus Curletti & Migliore, 2014
- Agrilus tinantius Obenberger, 1960
- Agrilus tinctipennis Fisher, 1933
- Agrilus tiomanensis Jendek in Jendek & Grebennikov, 2009
- Agrilus titi Jendek & Grebennikov, 2019
- Agrilus titlacabanae Fisher, 1938
- Agrilus tityos Obenberger, 1935
- Agrilus tlacoae Fisher, 1938
- Agrilus tlaculteutlae Fisher, 1938
- Agrilus togoensis Kerremans, 1899
- Agrilus tokyoensis Kurosawa, 1985
- Agrilus tolianus Obenberger, 1924
- Agrilus tomentilobus Jendek, 2021
- Agrilus tomentipennis Jendek & Chamorro, 2012
- Agrilus tomentosulus Obenberger, 1917
- Agrilus tonkineus Kerremans, 1895
- Agrilus tonkinigena Obenberger, 1924
- Agrilus topazius Curletti, 1997
- Agrilus torpedo Curletti, 1995
- Agrilus torquatus LeConte, 1860
- Agrilus torvus Curletti & Brûlé, 2011,
- Agrilus toteci Fisher, 1938
- Agrilus totochti Fisher, 1938
- Agrilus totus Curletti, 2018
- Agrilus touareg Théry, 1930
- Agrilus touroulti Curletti & Brûlé, 2011
- Agrilus touroultinus Curletti, 2015
- Agrilus townsendi Fall in Fall & Cockerell, 1907
- Agrilus toxopeusi Obenberger, 1932
- Agrilus toxotes Obenberger, 1935
- Agrilus toyoshimai Tôyama, 1988
- Agrilus tractatus Curletti, 2018
- Agrilus tragulus Obenberger, 1935
- Agrilus trames Curletti & Brûlé, 2013
- Agrilus tranquillus Curletti, 1997
- Agrilus transbaicalensis Obenberger, 1935
- Agrilus transgresor Hołyński, 2018
- Agrilus transimpressus Fall, 1925
- Agrilus transitorius Kerremans, 1897
- Agrilus transversesulcatus Reitter, 1890
- Agrilus transversus Kerremans, 1894
- Agrilus traymanyi Baudon, 1965
- Agrilus trepanatus Jendek, 2013
- Agrilus tres Curletti, 2019
- Agrilus trevori Baudon, 1968
- Agrilus triangularis Kerremans, 1899
- Agrilus trico Curletti, 1998
- Agrilus tricolor Deyrolle, 1864
- Agrilus tricoloris Jendek, 2013
- Agrilus trident Jendek, 2021
- Agrilus tridentatus Gory, 1841
- Agrilus triglav Jendek, 2021
- Agrilus trilineatus Hespenheide, 1988
- Agrilus trimaculatus Gory, 1841
- Agrilus trinidadensis Fisher, 1943
- Agrilus trinotatus Saunders, 1873
- Agrilus tripartitus Deyrolle, 1864
- Agrilus triptolemus Obenberger, 1935
- Agrilus triseriatus Curletti, 2018
- Agrilus trispinosus Gory, 1841
- Agrilus tristani Curletti & Brûlé, 2011
- Agrilus tristicolor Obenberger, 1931
- Agrilus tristinus Obenberger, 1924
- Agrilus tristis Deyrolle, 1864
- Agrilus trito Deyrolle, 1864
- Agrilus triton Obenberger, 1935
- Agrilus trochilus Abielle de Perrin, 1897
- Agrilus tropinii Curletti, 2002
- Agrilus truncatipennis Descarpentries & Villiers, 1967
- Agrilus truncatus Jendek, 2007
- Agrilus trypantiformis Fisher, 1929
- Agrilus tsacasi Descarpentries & Villiers, 1963
- Agrilus tsavoensis Curletti & Sakalian, 2009
- Agrilus tschitscherini Semenov, 1895
- Agrilus tshapadarensis Alexeev in Alexeev, et al., 1992
- Agrilus tsushimanus Kurosawa, 1963
- Agrilus tsutsumiuchii Ohmomo, 2006
- Agrilus tuber Jendek, 2011
- Agrilus tuberculicollis Kerremans, 1894
- Agrilus tuberculiventris Deyrolle, 1864
- Agrilus tuberosus Curletti, 2009
- Agrilus tubulinus Curletti, 2019
- Agrilus tubulus Kerremans, 1897
- Agrilus tucumanellus Obenberger, 1933
- Agrilus tucumanus Kerremans, 1903
- Agrilus tugio Obenberger, 1935
- Agrilus tullius Obenberger, 1933
- Agrilus tumultuosus Obenberger, 1932
- Agrilus tumupasaensis Fisher, 1925
- Agrilus turanus Jendek, 2021
- Agrilus turbator Obenberger, 1935
- Agrilus turcicus Marseul, 1866
- Agrilus turei Curletti, 2002
- Agrilus turgitus Kerremans, 1897
- Agrilus turnbowi Nelson, 1990
- Agrilus turneri Obenberger, 1935
- Agrilus turrialbensis Fisher, 1929
- Agrilus tyndarus Kerremans, 1913
- Agrilus tynnanthi Curletti, 2005
- Agrilus tyrannus Curletti, 2011
- Agrilus tyrtaeus Kerremans, 1913
- Agrilus uelensis Obenberger, 1935
- Agrilus uenoi Kurosawa, 1963
- Agrilus uhagoni Abeille de Perrin, 1897
- Agrilus uhligi Curletti, 2002
- Agrilus ukerewensis Obenberger, 1941
- Agrilus ukrainensis Obenberger, 1936
- Agrilus ulaangomiensis Cobos, 1972
- Agrilus ulmicola Jendek, 2011
- Agrilus ultramarinus Deyrolle, 1864
- Agrilus umactli Fisher, 1938
- Agrilus umbratus Harold, 1869
- Agrilus umbrosellus Obenberger, 1935
- Agrilus umbrosus Gory & Laporte, 1837
- Agrilus umrongso Jendek, 2013
- Agrilus undatus Jendek & Nakládal, 2018
- Agrilus undulatipennis Kurosawa, 1976
- Agrilus unguiculosus Obenberger, 1936
- Agrilus ungujanus Curletti, 2018
- Agrilus unicolor Gory & Laporte, 1837
- Agrilus unicus Kerremans, 1897
- Agrilus uniformipubis Obenberger, 1924
- Agrilus uniformis Waterhouse, 1889
- Agrilus unipunctatus Gory & Laporte, 1837
- Agrilus unus Curletti, 2005
- Agrilus updikei Hespenheidei, 2012
- Agrilus upsilon Jendek, 2015
- Agrilus urbanus Kerremans, 1897
- Agrilus uromastyx Curletti & Magnani, 2006
- Agrilus ursus Curletti, 2011
- Agrilus uruguayanus Obenberger, 1933
- Agrilus usaramoensis Kerremans, 1899
- Agrilus usingeri Fisher, 1938
- Agrilus ussuricola Obenberger, 1924
- Agrilus ustjurti Kostin, 1973
- Agrilus ustus Curletti, 2002
- Agrilus utahensis Westcott in Nelson & Westcott, 1991
- Agrilus utens Kerremans, 1897
- Agrilus uvarovi Obenberger, 1933
- Agrilus uxo Jendek & Grebennikov, 2019
- Agrilus uyapi Jendek & Grebennikov, 2019
- Agrilus uzala Jendek & Nakládal, 2019
- Agrilus uzbekistanus Stepanov, 1958
- Agrilus vacuus Kerremans, 1912
- Agrilus vagans Harold, 1869
- Agrilus vaginalis Abeille de Perrin, 1897
- Agrilus vaillanti Obenberger, 1935
- Agrilus valdedotatus Curletti & Ong, 2022
- Agrilus validiusculus Semenov, 1891
- Agrilus validus Deyrolle, 1864
- Agrilus vandenberghei Westcott & Hespenheide, 2006
- Agrilus vanini Curletti & Migliore, 2014
- Agrilus variabilis Kerremans, 1899
- Agrilus variatus Kerremans, 1897
- Agrilus variegatus Gory & Laporte, 1837
- Agrilus varius Kerremans, 1895
- Agrilus vasiljevi Obenberger, 1933
- Agrilus vaticinator Jendek, 2021
- Agrilus vaucheri Abeille de Perrin, 1895
- Agrilus vaulogeri Bourgoin, 1922
- Agrilus vayssieresi Curletti, 2005
- Agrilus velasco Fisher, 1933
- Agrilus velatus Kerremans, 1912
- Agrilus veles Jendek, 2021
- Agrilus velox Curletti & Brûlé, 2011
- Agrilus velutinomaculatus Waterhouse, 1889
- Agrilus vendibilis Jendek & Nakládal, 2019
- Agrilus venosus Gory & Laporte, 1837
- Agrilus ventralis Horn, 1891
- Agrilus ventricosus Fairmaire, 1888
- Agrilus ventripotens Kerremans, 1900
- Agrilus ventrituber Jendek in Jendek & Grebennikov, 2009
- Agrilus venustulus Burmeister, 1872
- Agrilus venustus Kerremans, 1897
- Agrilus verax Kerremans, 1897
- Agrilus vergineus Curletti & Brûlé, 2014
- Agrilus verityi Hespenheide, 1988
- Agrilus vermiculatus (Waterhouse, 1889)
- Agrilus vermiculus Curletti & Brûlé, 2021
- Agrilus versicolor Chevrolat, 1838
- Agrilus verticis Curletti, 2020
- Agrilus verutoides Obenberger, 1935
- Agrilus verutus Kerremans, 1897
- Agrilus vescivittatus Hespenheide & Westcott, 2011
- Agrilus vescus Kerremans, 1897
- Agrilus vespilio Kerremans, 1897
- Agrilus vespillo Curletti & Brûlé, 2011
- Agrilus vestitus Deyrolle, 1864
- Agrilus vezenyii Pochon, 1967
- Agrilus vianai Obenberger, 1947
- Agrilus vicarius Curletti & Ong, 2023
- Agrilus victima Fisher, 1944
- Agrilus victorai Jendek, 2021
- Agrilus victoriae Obenberger, 1923
- Agrilus videns Kerremans, 1900
- Agrilus viduus Kerremans, 1914
- Agrilus vientianensis Baudon, 1961
- Agrilus viettei Descarpentries & Villiers, 1963
- Agrilus vietticulus Jendek, 2021
- Agrilus vigil Jendek, 2011
- Agrilus vigilans Waterhouse, 1889
- Agrilus vilis Saunders, 1874
- Agrilus villosostriatus Thomson, 1879
- Agrilus villosulus Kerremans, 1897
- Agrilus villus Curletti & Brûlé, 2011
- Agrilus vimmerianus Obenberger, 1935
- Agrilus vinctus Fisher, 1933
- Agrilus vinitius Obenberger, 1933
- Agrilus violaceicollis Gory, 1841
- Agrilus violacellus Thomson, 1879
- Agrilus violaceoviridis Cobos, 1967
- Agrilus violaceus Nonfried, 1892
- Agrilus vir Jendek, 2015
- Agrilus virescens Gory & Laporte, 1837
- Agrilus viridanus (Kerremans, 1900)
- Agrilus viridator Obenberger, 1923
- Agrilus viridescens Knull, 1935
- Agrilus viridiaeneus Deyrolle, 1864
- Agrilus viridiaeris Curletti, 2005
- Agrilus viridicaerulans Marseul, 1865
- Agrilus viridicellus Cobos, 1964
- Agrilus viridicephalus Fisher, 1929
- Agrilus viridicolor Obenberger, 1924
- Agrilus viridicupreus Saunders, 1866
- Agrilus viridifrons Kerremans, 1893
- Agrilus viridiobscurus Saunders, 1873
- Agrilus viridis (Linnaeus, 1758) — beech splendour beetle
- Agrilus viridissimus Cobos, 1964
- Agrilus virilis Curletti, 2006
- Agrilus virginiae Curletti & Brûlé, 2013
- Agrilus visnu Obenberger, 1916
- Agrilus vitellius Obenberger, 1935
- Agrilus vittaticollis (Randall, 1838)
- Agrilus vittatus Deyrolle, 1864
- Agrilus vittulus Waterhouse, 1889
- Agrilus vitzilopuchtli Fisher, 1938
- Agrilus vixtocioatlae Fisher, 1938
- Agrilus vlachi Obenberger, 1933
- Agrilus voegelini Théry, 1934
- Agrilus vogti Jendek, 2017
- Agrilus volkovitshi Jendek, 2007
- Agrilus volof Curletti, 1998
- Agrilus volucer Kerremans, 1897
- Agrilus voluptuosus Kerremans, 1897
- Agrilus voriseki Jendek, 1995
- Agrilus votus Kerremans, 1897
- Agrilus vseteckai Obenberger, 1935
- Agrilus vulcanus Deyrolle, 1864
- Agrilus vulgaris Harold, 1878
- Agrilus wachteli Curletti, 2020
- Agrilus wagneranus Curletti, 1999
- Agrilus wagneri Kerremans, 1913
- Agrilus walesicus Obenberger, 1923
- Agrilus walkeri Théry, 1904
- Agrilus wallaby Curletti, 2001
- Agrilus wallaroo Curletti, 2001
- Agrilus walshi Fisher, 1937
- Agrilus walsinghami Crotch, 1873
- Agrilus waltersi Nelson, 1985
- Agrilus wangala Jendek, 2021
- Agrilus wasmanni Obenberger, 1933
- Agrilus watanabei Tôyama, 1985
- Agrilus waterhousei Kerremans, 1892
- Agrilus weilli Baudon, 1968
- Agrilus wenzeli Knull, 1934
- Agrilus westerduijni Curletti, 2019
- Agrilus westermanni Gory & Laporte, 1837
- Agrilus wewakinus Curletti, 2006
- Agrilus weyersi Kerremans, 1900
- Agrilus wichmanniellus Obenberger, 1960
- Agrilus wilhemi Curletti, 2017
- Agrilus wilsoni Baudon, 1968
- Agrilus windhoeki Obenberger, 1935
- Agrilus wittemani Jendek, 1994
- Agrilus wolfgangi Jendek, 2021
- Agrilus woodi Obenberger, 1935
- Agrilus woodlarkianus Kerremans, 1900
- Agrilus wos Jendek & Grebennikov, 2019
- Agrilus wrighti Curletti, 2008
- Agrilus wuhlwuhl Curletti, 2002
- Agrilus wytsmani Obenberger, 1933
- Agrilus xanthias Descarpentries & Villiers, 1963
- Agrilus xanthograptus Obenberger, 1935
- Agrilus xantholomus (Dalman, 1823)
- Agrilus xanthonotus Waterhouse, 1889
- Agrilus xantippus Kerremans, 1913
- Agrilus xen Jendek & Grebennikov, 2019
- Agrilus xenius Obenberger, 1924
- Agrilus xia Jendek & Grebennikov, 2019
- Agrilus xipetoteci Fisher, 1938
- Agrilus xiphion Obenberger, 1933
- Agrilus xiphos Jendek, 2015
- Agrilus xis Jendek & Grebennikov, 2019
- Agrilus xucotzinae Fisher, 1938
- Agrilus xylochaerus Obenberger, 1947
- Agrilus yakushimensis Tôyama, 1985
- Agrilus yamabusi Miwa & Chûjô, 1940
- Agrilus yamajii Tôyama, 1985
- Agrilus yamawakii Kurosawa, 1957
- Agrilus yamdena Jendek, 2021
- Agrilus yami Kaino, 1938
- Agrilus yangambii Curletti, 2013
- Agrilus yanzatzanus Curletti, 2015
- Agrilus yasumatsui Kurosawa, 1964
- Agrilus yemenita Curletti & van Harten, 2002
- Agrilus yeti Curletti & Migliore, 2014
- Agrilus yiacatecutli Fisher, 1938
- Agrilus yoa Jendek & Grebennikov, 2019
- Agrilus yonahaensis Tôyama, 1985
- Agrilus yuk Jendek & Grebennikov, 2019
- Agrilus yulensis Obenberger, 1924
- Agrilus yunnanicola Obenberger, 1936
- Agrilus yunnanus Obenberger, 1927
- Agrilus yvesi Curletti, 2005
- Agrilus yxtliltoni Fisher, 1938
- Agrilus zamboangensis Fisher, 1921
- Agrilus zamoranus Curletti, 2019
- Agrilus zanthoxylumi Zhang & Wang, 1992
- Agrilus zao Jendek & Grebennikov, 2019
- Agrilus zaria Jendek, 2021
- Agrilus zarudnyi Obenberger, 1933
- Agrilus zebratus Curletti, 1998
- Agrilus zhelochovtsevi Alexeev, 1981
- Agrilus zhongdian Jendek in Jendek & Grebennikov, 2009
- Agrilus zhuang Jendek, 2011
- Agrilus zhui Jendek, 2011
- Agrilus ziegleri Niehuis, 2006
- Agrilus zigzag Marseul, 1866
- Agrilus zikani Obenberger, 1935
- Agrilus zim Jendek & Grebennikov, 2019
- Agrilus zmey Jendek, 2021
- Agrilus zonatus Kerremans, 1898
- Agrilus zoster Curletti, 2009
- Agrilus zuluanus Obenberger, 1935
- Agrilus zumbadoi Hespenheidei, 2012
- Agrilus zythum Curletti, 2015

=== Fossil taxa ===
Five fossil taxa have been described:

- †Agrilus baueri Heyden, 1862
- †Agrilus corrugatus (Waterhouse, 1889)
- †Agrilus liragus Barter and Brown, 1949
- †Agrilus praepolitus Wickham, 1914
- †Agrilus sucinum Curletti & Gigli, 2022 Mexican amber, Miocene
