= Tobiesen Island =

Island in Svalbard, Norway

Native name: Tobiesenøya
- Location within Svalbard

Geography
- Coordinates: 78.9426°N 21.729105°E

Administration
- Norway

Tobiesen Island (Norwegian: Tobiesenøya) is one of the Rønnbeck Islands in the Svalbard archipelago. It lies in Hinlopen Strait northeast of Cape Weyprecht on Spitsbergen. It is the northernmost and easternmost island in the archipelago.

The island is a low basalt cliff. The island has an hourglass shape with a north–south orientation, reaching an elevation of 16 meters (52 ft) above sea level on its south end and 18 meters (59 ft) on the north. There are some unnamed rocks and islets lying off the island to the northwest. The closest neighboring islands are Simonsen Island about 2.6 kilometers (1.6 mi) to the southwest and Kiepert Island (one of the Bastian Islands) about 3 kilometers (1.9 mi) to the north. The wildlife consists largely of polar bears.

The island was discovered in 1867 by the Swedish-Norwegian polar explorer Nils Fredrik Rønnbeck. It is named after Sivert Kristian Tobiesen (1821–1873), a Norwegian seal hunter that spent the winter on Bear Island.
