= Klöden Island =

Island in Svalbard, Norway

Native name: Klödenøya
- Location within Svalbard

Geography
- Coordinates: 78.99°N 21.54°E

Administration
- Norway

Klöden Island (Norwegian: Klödenøya) is a minor island in the Bastian Islands in the Svalbard archipelago. It lies east of Wilhelm Island and northeast of Spitsbergen.

The island has a banana-like shape, with a length of 615 meters (2,018 ft) in a north-south orientation, but its width does not exceed 200 meters (660 ft). The island is a low basalt cliff that reaches an elevation of only 11 meters (36 ft) above sea level. There are unnamed holms off the northwest shore of the island. The closest neighboring islands are Geographer Island about 1.7 kilometers (1.1 mi) to the west, Kiepert Island 1.5 kilometers (0.93 mi) to the southwest, and Deegen Island 1.5 kilometers (0.93 mi) to the south. The wildlife consists largely of polar bears.

The Bastian Islands were discovered in 1867 by the Swedish-Norwegian polar explorer Nils Fredrik Rønnbeck, who was the first to sail around Spitsbergen. Most of the Bastian Islands were named during the First German North Polar Expedition in 1868, led by Carl Koldewey, and this island was named after the German geographer Gustav Adolf von Klöden (1814–1885).
