= Koner Island =

Island in Svalbard, Norway

Native name: Konerøya
- Location within Svalbard

Geography
- Coordinates: 79.02°N 21.38°E

Administration
- Norway

Koner Island (Norwegian: Konerøya) is a minor island in the Bastian Islands in the Svalbard archipelago. It lies east of Wilhelm Island and northeast of Spitsbergen.

The island is elongated, measuring 1.5 kilometers (0.93 mi) in a north-south direction and no more than 200 meters (660 ft) in width. The island is a low basalt cliff that reaches an elevation of only 27 meters (89 ft) above sea level. The closest neighboring islands are Lange Island about 4 kilometers (2.5 mi) to the northwest and Geographer Island about 2 kilometers (1.2 mi) to the south. The wildlife consists largely of polar bears.

The Bastian Islands were discovered in 1867 by the Swedish-Norwegian polar explorer Nils Fredrik Rønnbeck, who was the first to sail around Spitsbergen. Most of the Bastian Islands were named during the First German North Polar Expedition in 1868, led by Carl Koldewey. This island is named after the German geographer Wilhelm Koner (1817–1887).
