= Simonsen Island =

Island in Svalbard, Norway

Native name: Simonsenøya
- Location within Svalbard

Geography
- Coordinates: 78.92789°N 21.63157°E

Administration
- Norway

Simonsen Island (Norwegian: Simonsenøya) is one of the Rønnbeck Islands in the Svalbard archipelago. It lies in Hinlopen Strait northeast of Cape Weyprecht on Spitsbergen. The island is a low basalt cliff and its highest point is only 10 meters (33 ft) above sea level. The closest islands are neighboring Nedrevaag Island about 500 meters (1,600 ft) to the southwest and Tobiesen Island about 3 kilometers (1.9 mi) to the northeast. The wildlife consists largely of polar bears.

The island was discovered in 1867 by the Swedish-Norwegian polar explorer Nils Fredrik Rønnbeck. It is named after W. Simonsen (or Simonson), a Norwegian navigator that helped explore the Kara Sea in 1871 on board the Sleipner.
