= Skipper Island =

Island in Svalbard

Native name: Skipperøya
- Location within Svalbard

Geography
- Coordinates: 78.93°N 21.30°E

Administration
- Norway

Skipper Island (Norwegian: Skipperøya) is one of the Rønnbeck Islands in the Svalbard archipelago. It lies northeast of Cape Weyprecht on Spitsbergen. The island is a low basalt cliff and its highest point is less than 10 meters (33 ft) above sea level. The closest neighboring islands are Qvale Island about 2.4 kilometers (1.5 mi) to the east and Torkildsen Island about 4 kilometers (2.5 mi) to the southwest. The wildlife consists largely of polar bears.

The Rønnbeck Islands are named after Norwegian seal hunters, and this one is named after skippers in general.
