= Torkildsen Island =

Island in Svalbard, Norway

Native name: Torkildsenøya
- Location within Svalbard

Geography
- Coordinates: 78.90163°N 21.114944°E

Administration
- Norway

Torkildsen Island (Norwegian: Torkildsenøya) is a small island in Hinlopen Strait. It is part of the Rønnbeck Islands in the Svalbard archipelago. It lies east of Cape Weyprecht on Spitsbergen.

The island is a low basalt cliff and its highest point is 13 meters (43 ft) above sea level. It is elongated and consists of four parts. At its east and west ends there are two small peninsulas. The central part of the island itself is divided into two parts by a narrow area, probably a sandbank like that at Kiepert Island in the nearby Bastian Islands.

The closest neighboring islands are Mack Island about 300 meters (980 ft) to the west and Isaksen Island about 1 kilometer (0.62 mi) to the northwest. The wildlife consists largely of polar bears.

The island was discovered in 1867 by the Swedish-Norwegian polar explorer Nils Fredrik Rønnbeck. The Rønnbeck Islands are named after Norwegian seal hunters, and this one is named after the sealing skipper T. Torkildsen.
