= Geographer Island =

Island in the Svalbard archipelago, Norway

Native name: Geograføya
- Location within Svalbard

Geography
- Coordinates: 78.99°N 21.44°E

Administration
- Norway

Geographer Island (Norwegian: Geograføya) is a minor island in the Bastian Islands in the Svalbard archipelago. It lies east of Wilhelm Island and northeast of Spitsbergen.

The island has a teardrop shape, measuring 530 meters (1,740 ft) from east to west and 560 meters (1,840 ft) from north to south. The island is a low basalt cliff that reaches an elevation of only 37 meters (121 ft) above sea level. There is an unnamed spit on the east side of the island and some unnamed holms off its shore. There is a large unnamed islet 115 meters (377 ft) south of the island. The closest neighboring islands are Koner Island about 2 kilometers (1.2 mi) to the north, Klöden Island 1.6 kilometers (0.99 mi) to the west, and Deegen Island 2.2 kilometers (1.4 mi) to the southeast. The wildlife consists largely of polar bears.

The Bastian Islands were discovered in 1867 by the Swedish-Norwegian polar explorer Nils Fredrik Rønnbeck, who was the first to sail around Spitsbergen. Most of the Bastian Islands were named during the First German North Polar Expedition in 1868, led by Carl Koldewey. This island is not named after a specific person, but after geographers in general.
