= Deegen Island =

Island

Native name: Deegenøya
- Location within Svalbard

Geography
- Coordinates: 78.97°N 21.53°E

Administration
- Norway

Deegen Island (Norwegian: Deegenøya) is a minor island in the Bastian Islands in the Svalbard archipelago. It lies east of Wilhelm Island and northeast of Spitsbergen.

The elongated island has a length of 1.5 kilometers (0.93 mi) with an east–west orientation, but its width does not exceed 300 meters (980 ft). The island is a low basalt cliff that reaches an elevation of 32 meters (105 ft) above sea level. There are unnamed holms off the northwest shore of the island. The closest neighboring islands are Kiepert Island about 770 meters (2,530 ft) to the east, Klöden Island 1.5 kilometers (0.93 mi) to the north, and Geographer Island 2.3 kilometers (1.4 mi) to the northwest. The wildlife consists largely of polar bears.

The Bastian Islands were discovered in 1867 by the Swedish-Norwegian polar explorer Nils Fredrik Rønnbeck, who was the first to sail around Spitsbergen. Most of the Bastian Islands were named during the First German North Polar Expedition in 1868, led by Carl Koldewey, and this island was named after a German supreme court judge named Deegen.
