= Nedrevaag Island =

Island in Svalbard, Norway

Native name: Nedrevågøya
- Location within Svalbard

Geography
- Coordinates: 78.933333°N 21.183333°E

Administration
- Norway

Nedrevaag Island (Norwegian: Nedrevågøya) is one of the Rønnbeck Islands in the Svalbard archipelago. It lies in Hinlopen Strait northeast of Cape Weyprecht on Spitsbergen. The island is a low basalt cliff and its highest point is only 17 meters (56 ft) above sea level. The closest neighboring islands are neighboring Simonsen Island about 500 meters (1,600 ft) to the northeast and Carlsen Island about 2.4 kilometers (1.5 mi) to the west. The wildlife consists largely of polar bears.

The island was discovered in 1867 by the Swedish-Norwegian polar explorer Nils Fredrik Rønnbeck. It is named after A. O. Nedrevaag, a Norwegian skipper that carried out geographical and meteorological observations in 1870 for the Kara Sea and Novaya Zemlya while on board the Johanne Marie.
