= Peschel =

Peschel may refer to:

- Andreas Peschel (born 1962), German microbiologist
- Axel Peschel (born 1942), German cyclist
- Carl Gottlieb Peschel (1798–1879), German painter
- Emma Peschel (born 2004), American ice hockey player
- Falko Peschel (born 1965), German pedagogue and proponent of open learning
- Frank Peschel (born 1974), German politician
- Henrik Peschel (born 1967), German film director and cameraman
- Herb Peschel (1913–1986), Canadian football player
- Keewaydinoquay Peschel (1919–1999), scholar, ethnobotanist, herbalist, medicine woman, teacher and author
- Kyle Peschel (born 1979), video game producer, director and editor
- Milan Peschel (born 1968), German actor
- Noemi Peschel (born 2001), German rhythmic gymnast
- Oscar Peschel (1826–1875), German geographer and amateur anthropologist
- Peter Peschel (born 1972), German football player
- Rudolf Peschel (1894–1944), German Generalleutnant in the Wehrmacht during World War II
- Uwe Peschel (born 1968), German professional road bicycle racer and a time trialist

== Places ==
- Peschel Island

== See also ==
- Peschl
