= Isaksen Island =

Island in Svalbard, Norway

Native name: Isaksenøya
- Location within Svalbard

Geography
- Coordinates: 78.9096°N 21.069959°E

Administration
- Norway

Isaksen Island (Norwegian: Isaksenøya) is a small island in Hinlopen Strait. It is part of the Rønnbeck Islands in the Svalbard archipelago. It lies east of Cape Weyprecht on Spitsbergen.

The island is a low basalt cliff and its highest point does not exceed 5 meters (16 ft) above sea level. The closest neighboring islands are Torkildsen Island about 1 kilometer (0.62 mi) to the southeast and Mack Island about 700 meters (2,300 ft) to the south. The wildlife consists largely of polar bears.

The island was discovered in 1867 by the Swedish-Norwegian polar explorer Nils Fredrik Rønnbeck. The island is named after the Norwegian skipper and ice-pilot Isak Nils Isaksen (1842–1920), who participated in several scientific expeditions in the Arctic.
