= Mack Island (Svalbard) =

Island in Svalbard, Norway

Native name: Mackøya
- Location within Svalbard

Geography
- Coordinates: 78.9021°N 21.066128°E

Administration
- Norway

Mack Island (Norwegian: Mackøya) is a small island in Hinlopen Strait. It is part of the Rønnbeck Islands in the Svalbard archipelago. It lies east of Cape Weyprecht on Spitsbergen.

The island is a low basalt cliff and its highest point is 22 meters (72 ft) above sea level. The closest neighboring islands are Torkildsen Island about 300 meters (980 ft) to the east and Isaksen Island about 700 meters (2,300 ft) to the north. The wildlife consists largely of polar bears.

The island was discovered in 1867 by the Swedish-Norwegian polar explorer Nils Fredrik Rønnbeck. The Rønnbeck Islands are named after Norwegian seal hunters, and this one is named after the Norwegian sealing captain Fridrich "Fritz" Christian Mack (1836–1876), who also made several important discoveries in the Arctic.
