= Carlsen Island =

Island

Native name: Carlsenøya
- Location within Svalbard

Geography
- Coordinates: 78.916667°N 21.333333°E

Administration
- Norway

Carlsen Island (Norwegian: Carlsenøya) is one of the Rønnbeck Islands in the Svalbard archipelago. It lies southeast of Hinlopen Strait and northeast of Cape Weyprecht on Spitsbergen. The island is a low basalt cliff and its highest point is only 10 meters (33 ft) above sea level. The closest neighboring islands are Qvale Island about 350 meters (1,150 ft) to the west and Nedrevaag Island about 2.4 kilometers (1.5 mi) to the west. There are also some islets to the north and east. The wildlife consists largely of polar bears.

The island is named after Elling Carlsen (1819–1900), a Norwegian skipper and seal hunter.
