= Qvale Island =

Island in Svalbard, Norway

Native name: Qvaleøya
- Location within Svalbard

Geography
- Coordinates: 78.93133°N 21.43205°E

Administration
- Norway

Qvale Island (Norwegian: Qvaleøya, in older sources Onale Island) is one of the Rønnbeck Islands in the Svalbard archipelago. It lies northeast of Cape Weyprecht on Spitsbergen. The island is a low basalt cliff and its highest point is only 16 meters (52 ft) above sea level. The closest neighboring islands are Carlsen Island about 350 meters (1,150 ft) to the east and Skipper Island about 2.4 kilometers (1.5 mi) to the west. The wildlife consists largely of polar bears.

The island is named after Per Pedersen Qvale (a.k.a. Kvale, 1822–1912), a Norwegian seal hunter born in Kinsarvik.
