= Lange Island =

Island in Svalbard, Norway

Native name: Langeøya
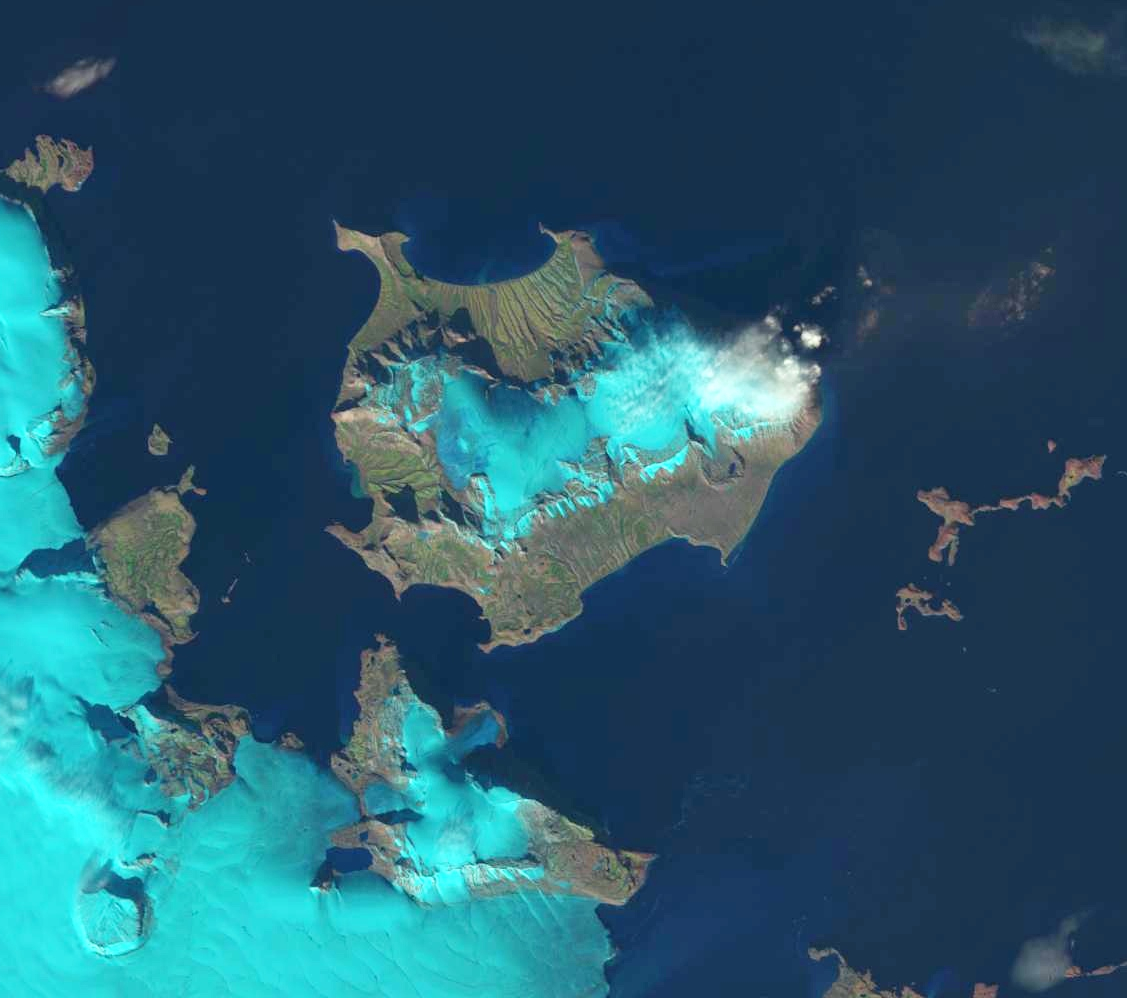
- Lange Island is the long island on the right

- Location within Svalbard

Geography
- Coordinates: 78.99°N 21.34°E

Administration
- Norway

Lange Island (Norwegian: Langeøya) is the largest of the Bastian Islands in the Svalbard archipelago. It lies east of Wilhelm Island and northeast of Spitsbergen.

The island is essentially a long series of low basalt cliffs measuring 6 kilometers (3.7 mi) from east to west, connected by sand bars. Its highest points, both unnamed, stand at its west and east ends, both reaching an elevation of 56 meters (184 ft) above sea level. The cliffs between then reach elevations of 40 to 45 meters (131–148 ft). The northwest end of the island is named Dove Spit (Norwegian: Doveneset) and the southwest end Lange Point (Norwegian: Langesporden, literally 'Lange Fishtail'). The closest neighboring islands are Ehrenberg Island about 500 meters (1,600 ft) to the north and Peschel Island about 900 meters (3,000 ft) to the southwest. The wildlife consists largely of polar bears.

The Bastian Islands were discovered in 1867 by the Swedish-Norwegian polar explorer Nils Fredrik Rønnbeck, who was the first to sail around Spitsbergen. Most of the Bastian Islands were named during the First German North Polar Expedition in 1868, led by Carl Koldewey. One might assume the physical shape of the island to be the origin of its name (from Norwegian lang 'long'); however, the island is in fact named after Henry Lange, a German cartographer and publisher of many maps and an atlas.
