= Bjørnsundet =

Strait between Spitsbergen and Wilhelm Island

Coordinates: 79.0601°N 19.9926°E

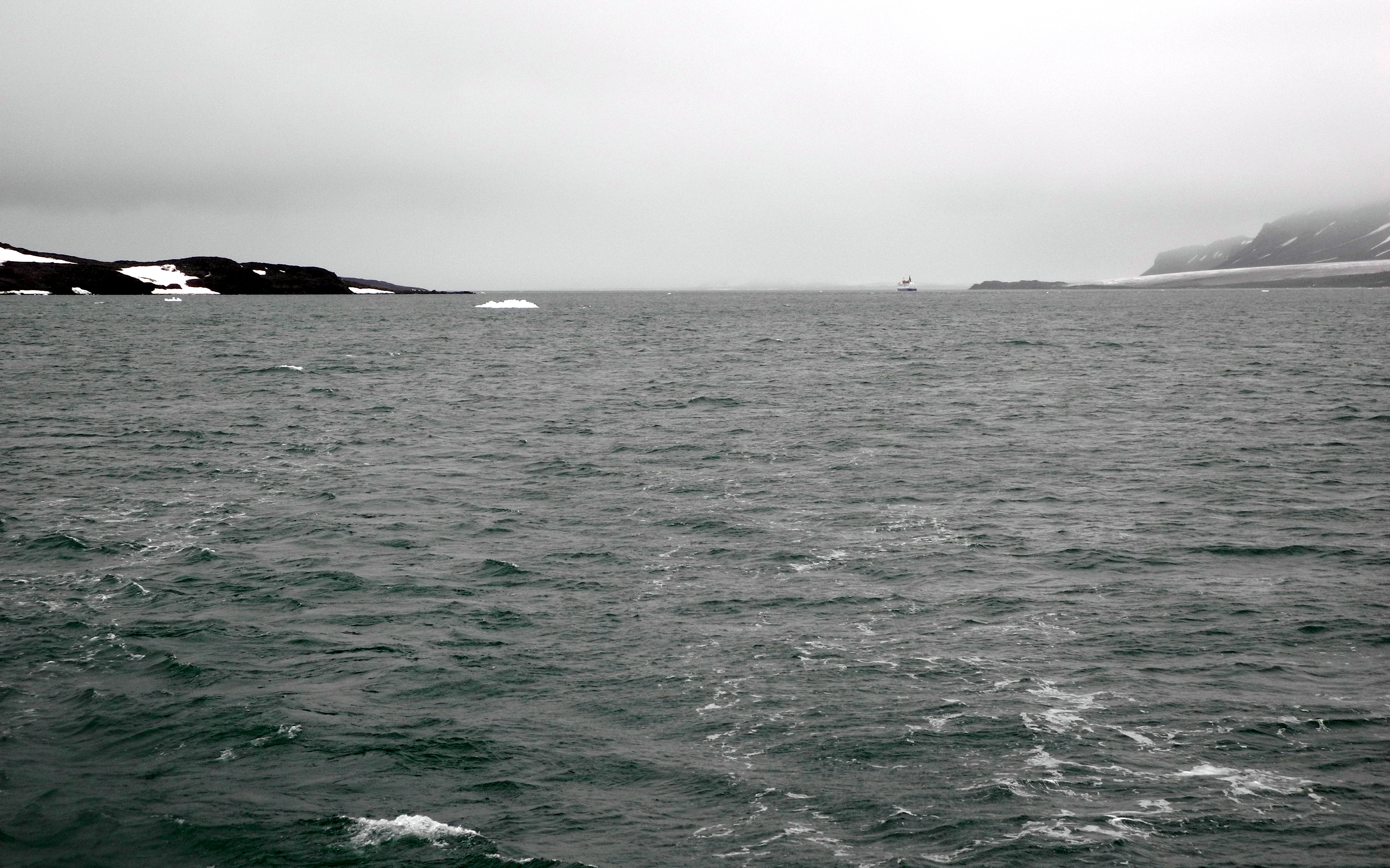
Bjørnsundet, the sound between Olav V Land (left) and Wilhelm Island (right).

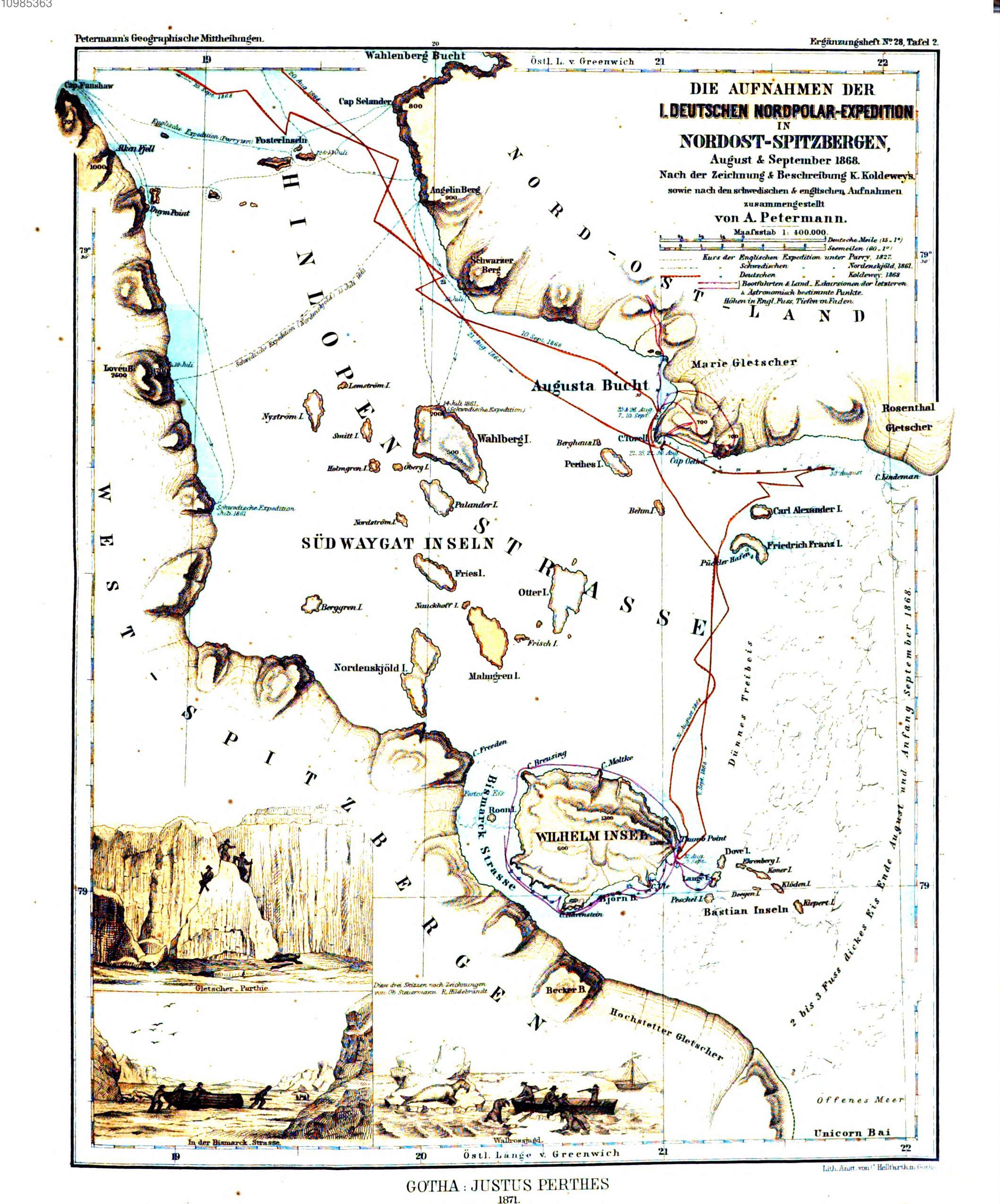
Bismarck Strasse on the map of 1868

Bjørnsundet is a strait between Spitsbergen and Wilhelm Island in Hinlopen Strait, Svalbard. The strait has depths 20–30 m (66–98 ft), and can be sailed by vessels.

The strait was discovered and first named Bismark Strasse by August Petermann during the First German North Polar Expedition in 1868.
