= Ehrenberg Island =

Island in Svalbard, Norway

Native name: Ehrenbergøya
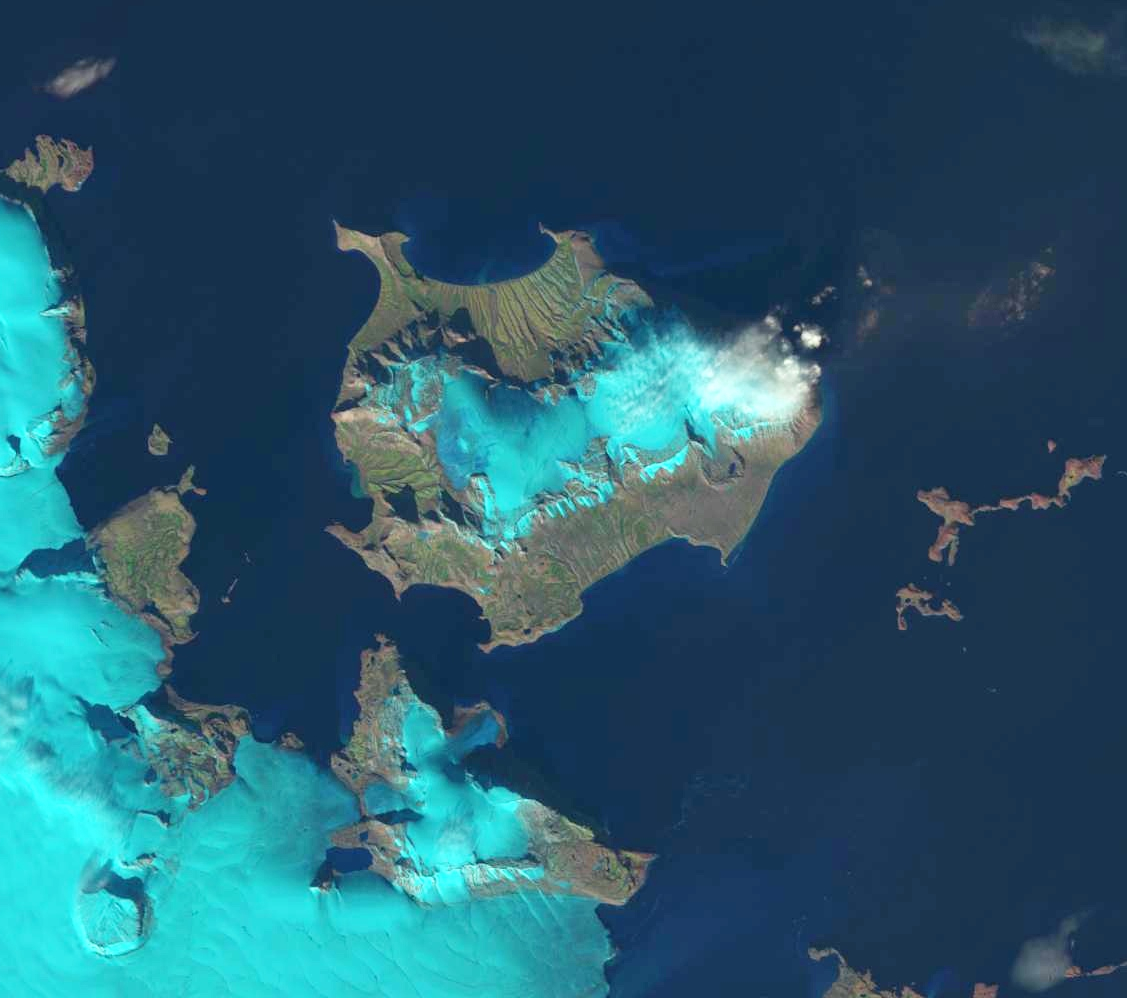
- Ehrenberg Island is the small triangular island to the right above the long island (Lange Island)

- Location within Svalbard

Geography
- Coordinates: 79.04359°N 21.11405°E

Administration
- Norway

Ehrenberg Island (Norwegian: Ehrenbergøya) is a minor island in the Bastian Islands in the Svalbard archipelago. It lies north of Lange Island.

The island has the shape of an inverted teardrop and its highest elevation is 30 meters (98 ft) above sea level. The closest neighboring islands are Lange Island about 500 meters (1,600 ft) to the south and Wilhelm Island about 7 kilometers (4.3 mi) to the east. The wildlife consists largely of polar bears.

Most of the Bastian Islands were named during the First German North Polar Expedition in 1868. Ehrenberg Island is named after the German zoologist Christian Gottfried Ehrenberg.
