= Max Neumeister =

German forestry scientist (1849–1929)

Max Heinrich August Neumeister (15 May 1849, in Kleindrebnitz – 1 December 1929, in Dresden) was a German forestry scientist.

From 1867 to 1869, he was a student at the Royal Saxon Academy of Forestry in Tharandt, where he had as instructors, Johann Friedrich Judeich and Max Pressler. Beginning in 1880, he worked as a teacher at the forestry academy, later serving as the school's director (1894–1904). From 1906 to 1919, he was head forester of the Dresden forestry district.

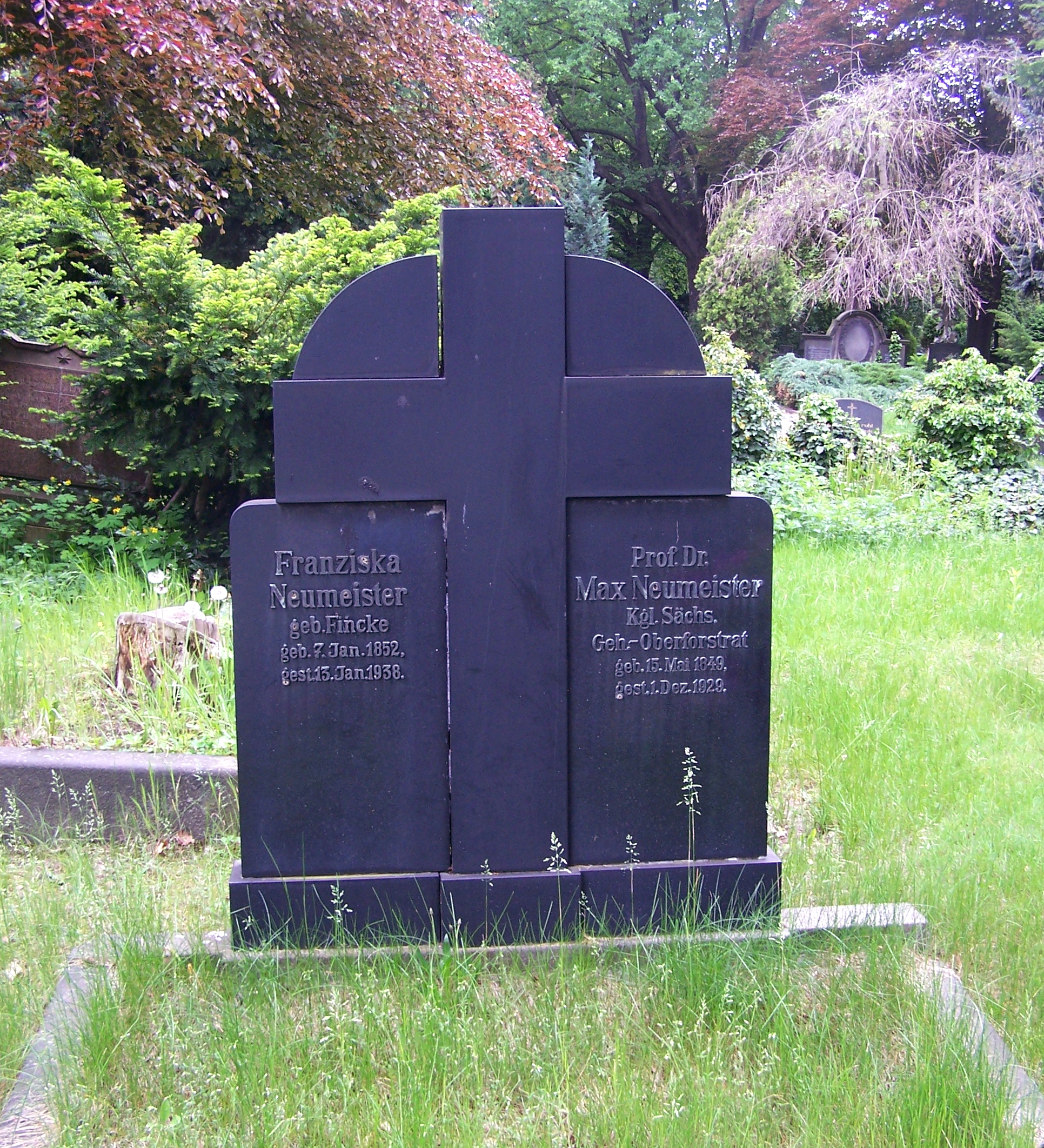
Grave of Max Neumeister at the Inneren Neustädter Friedhof in Dresden.

From 1910 to 1920, he was chairman of the Sächsischen Forstvereins (Saxon Forestry Association), and in 1917 was named chairman of the Deutschen Forstvereins (German Forestry Association).

== Selected publications ==
- Die Wildfütterung, 1892.
- Forstliche Cubirungstafeln, 8th edition 1893 (initial author, Max Pressler) - treatise on forestry measurements.
- Fütterung des edel- und rehwildes, 1895 - Feeding the noble and roe deer.
- Die Forsteinrichtung der Zukunft, 1900 - Forestry management of the future.
- Die Forsteinrichtung, 6th edition 1904 (initial author, Johann Friedrich Judeich) - Forestry management.
