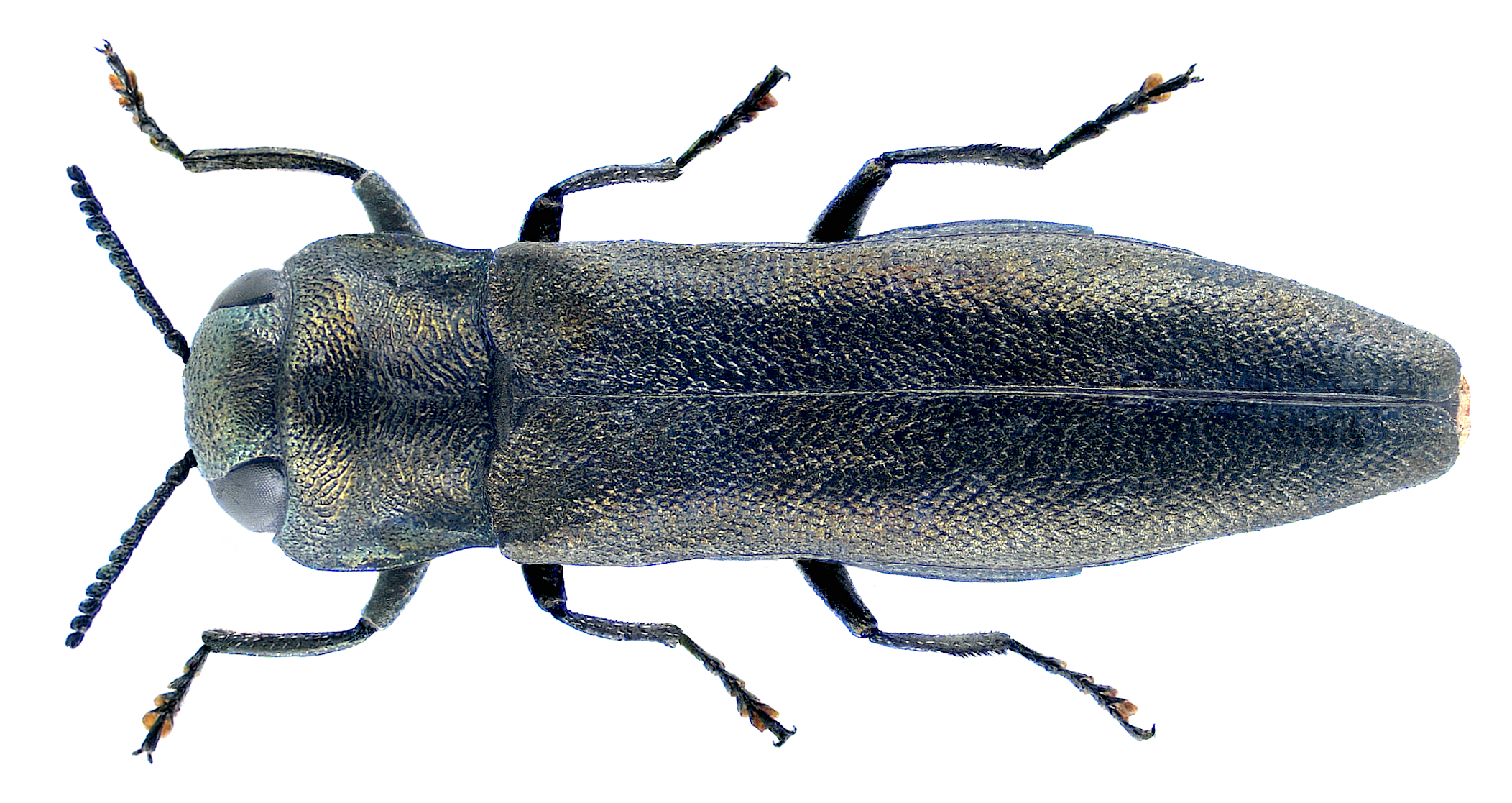

Scientific classification
- Domain: Eukaryota
- Kingdom: Animalia
- Phylum: Arthropoda
- Class: Insecta
- Order: Coleoptera
- Suborder: Polyphaga
- Infraorder: Elateriformia
- Family: Buprestidae
- Genus: Agrilus
- Species: A. betuleti

Binomial name
- Agrilus betuleti (Ratzeburg, 1837)

Synonyms
- Agrilus foveicollis Agrilus impressicollis Buprestis betuleti Callichitones betuleti Euryotes betuleti Paradomorphus betuleti Samboides betuleti Teres betuleti Therysambus betuleti

= Agrilus betuleti =

Species of beetle

Agrilus betuleti is a species of beetle in the family Buprestidae. It is found in Europe, and was first described as Buprestis betuleti by Julius Theodor Christian Ratzeburg in 1837
