= Elling Carlsen =

Norwegian skipper, seal hunter, and explorer (1819 – 1900)

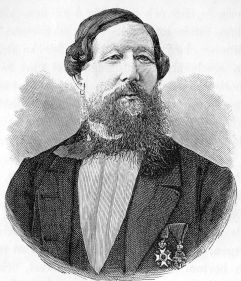
Elling Carlsen

Elling Carlsen (8 September 1819 – 18 April 1900) was a Norwegian skipper, seal hunter and explorer. He is credited with the discovery of Kong Karls Land and was one of the crew of the 1872 Austro-Hungarian North Pole Expedition. He is also known for the 1871 discovery of the lodge of Willem Barentsz, which had stood for 270 years since Barentsz sheltered there on his third and final voyage.

== Life ==
Elling Carlsen was born in Tromsø in Troms, Norway. Carlsen took the mate exam in 1846 and that same year he was given responsibility for his first ship. Carlsen made his first voyage out of Hammerfest in Finnmark, Norway.

In 1859, Carlsen discovered the island group that would later be named Kong Karls Land in the Svalbard archipelago in the Arctic Ocean. Although Carlsen is credited with the finding, the islands may have been first sighted by the whaler Thomas Edge in 1617. In 1863, Carlsen completed the first circumnavigation of Spitsbergen.

In 1868 and 1869, Carlsen sailed to Novaya Zemlya and into the Kara Sea, pioneering Norwegian hunting in the region.

During a voyage to the Arctic Ocean in 1871, Carlsen discovered the lodge of Willem Barentsz on the north-eastern shore of the archipelago of Novaya Zemlya. This winter camp had been used as shelter by Barentsz and his crew on their third voyage in 1597, shortly before Barentsz's death. The lodge had been perfectly preserved when Carlsen found it, and he made a sketch of its construction. He records finding two copper cooking pots, a barrel, a tool chest, clock, crowbar, flute, clothing, two empty chests, a cooking tripod and a number of pictures.

Carlsen was ice master and harpooneer on the 1872–1874 Austro-Hungarian North Pole Expedition led by Julius von Payer and Karl Weyprecht, which discovered the archipelago of Franz-Josef Land during two years stuck in the ice in the Barents Sea. At the conclusion of that expedition, Carlsen returned to his hometown of Tromsø, and he retired from exploration five years later. Carlsen died in Tromsø in 1900.

== Recognition ==
The crew of the Austro-Hungarian North Pole Expedition were celebrated throughout Europe, in part due to their diversity and the trials they had overcome, but Carlsen's quick return to Tromsø meant he never achieved celebrity status in Europe. After his death in 1900, Carlsen was posthumously made a Knight of the Order of St. Olaf.

Carlsen Island, one of the Rønnbeck Islands in the Svalbard archipelago, is named after Carlsen.
