= Peschel Island =

Island in Svalbard, Norway

Native name: Pescheløya
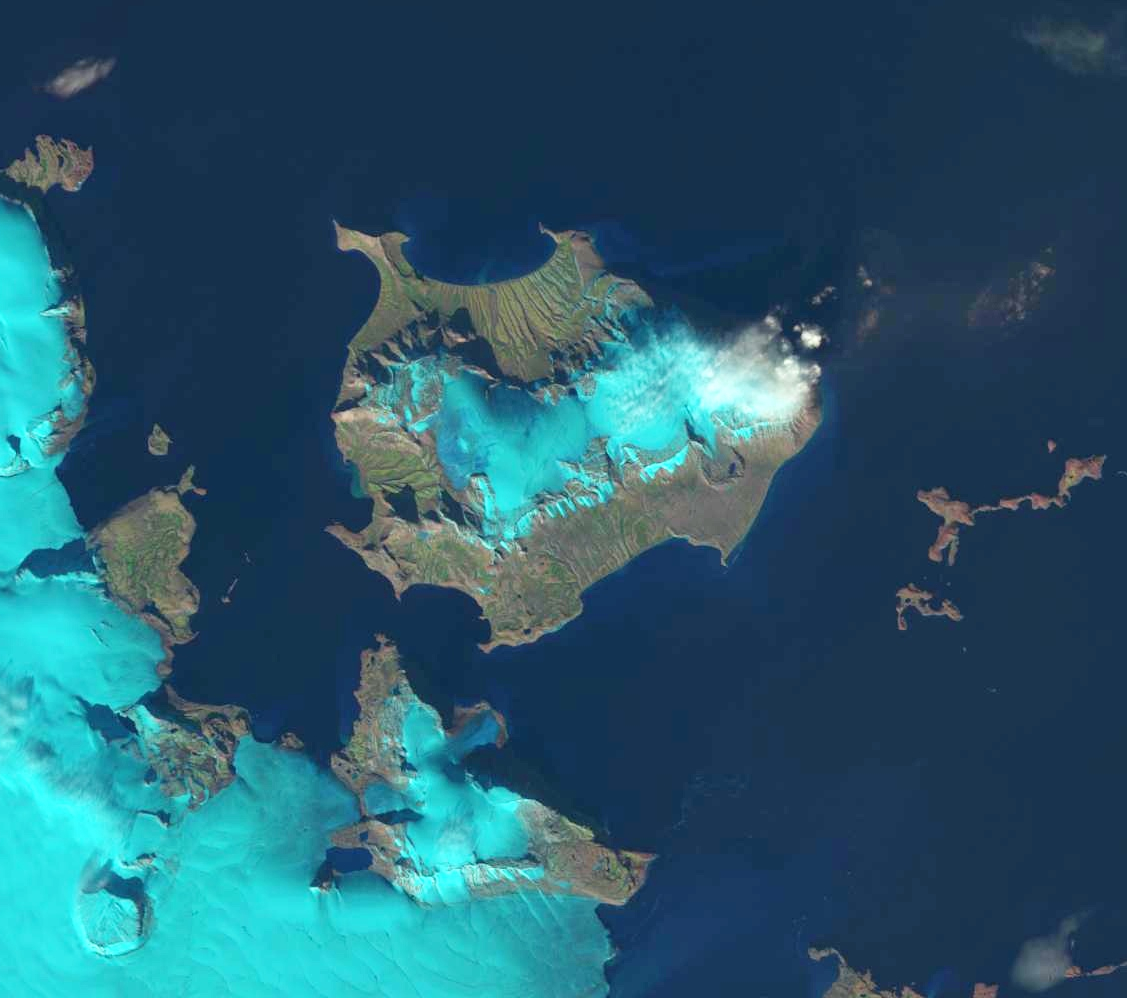
- Peschel Island is the island southwest of the long island (Lange Island)

- Location within Svalbard

Geography
- Coordinates: 79.00442°N 20.90638°E

Administration
- Norway

Peschel Island (Norwegian: Pescheløya) is the third-largest of the Bastian Islands in the Svalbard archipelago. It lies east of Wilhelm Island and northeast of Spitsbergen.

The island consists of low basalt cliffs that attain an elevation of 32 meters (105 ft) above sea level in the northern part of the island, 28 meters (92 ft) in the east, and 39 meters (128 ft) in the south. The closest neighboring islands are Lange Island about 1 kilometer (0.62 mi) to the north and Wilhelm Island about 4.7 kilometers (2.9 mi) to the northwest. The wildlife consists largely of polar bears.

The Bastian Islands were discovered in 1867 by the Swedish-Norwegian polar explorer Nils Fredrik Rønnbeck, who was the first to sail around Spitsbergen. Most of the Bastian Islands were named during the First German North Polar Expedition in 1868, led by Carl Koldewey. This island is named after Oscar Peschel, a German geographer.
