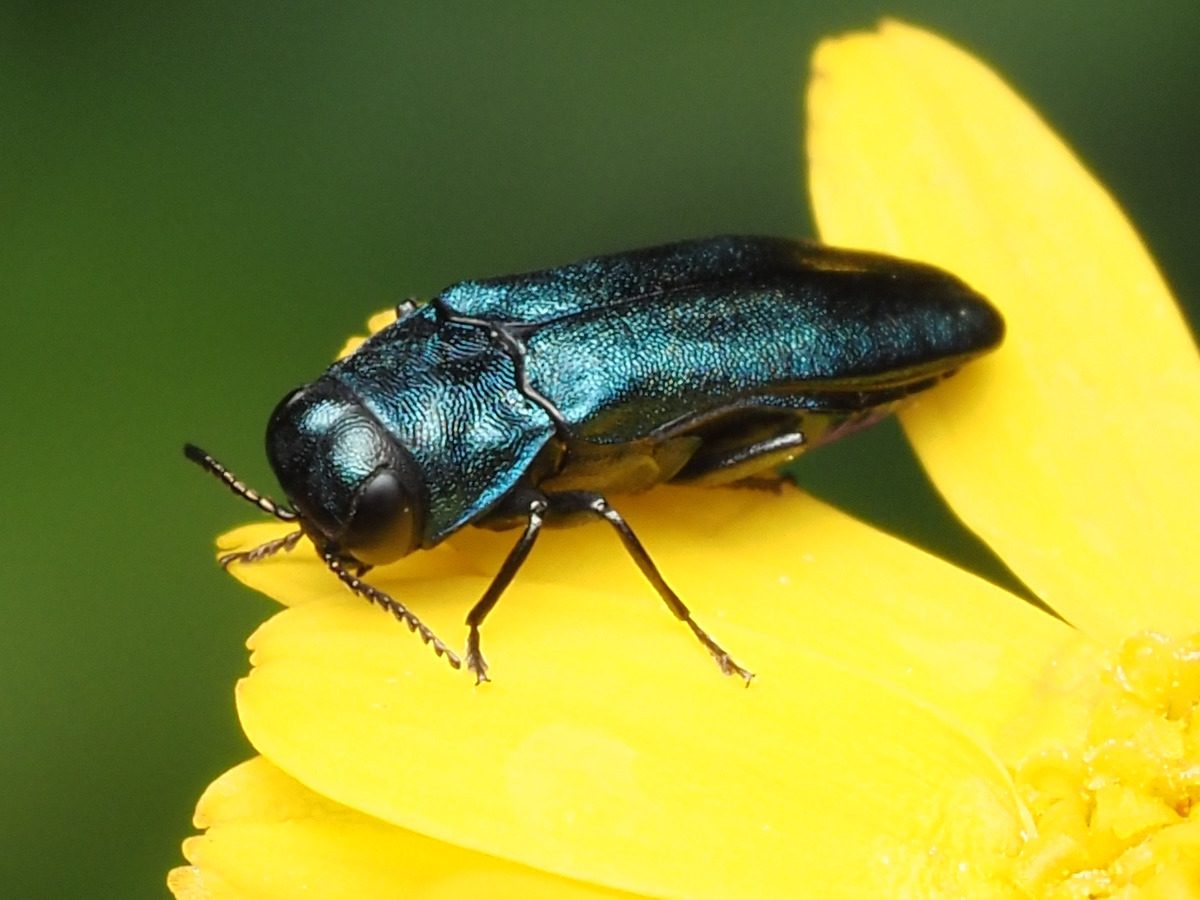

Scientific classification
- Kingdom: Animalia
- Phylum: Arthropoda
- Clade: Pancrustacea
- Class: Insecta
- Order: Coleoptera
- Suborder: Polyphaga
- Infraorder: Elateriformia
- Family: Buprestidae
- Genus: Agrilus
- Species: A. cyanescens

Binomial name
- Agrilus cyanescens Ratzeburg, 1837

Synonyms
- Agrilus amabilis Gory and Laporte, 1837; Agrilus fissifrons Abeille de Perrin, 1897; Agrilus kyselyi Obenberger, 1924; Agrilus sulcaticeps Abeille de Perrin, 1869

= Agrilus cyanescens =

Species of beetle

Agrilus cyanescens is a species of metallic wood-boring beetle in the family Buprestidae. It is found in Europe and Northern Asia (excluding China) and North America.

== Subspecies ==
These two subspecies belong to the species Agrilus cyanescens:

- Agrilus cyanescens cyanescens (Ratzeburg, 1837)
- Agrilus cyanescens johanidesi Niehuis, 1999
