= Kiepert Island =

Island in Svalbard, Norway

Native name: Kiepertøya
- Location within Svalbard

Geography
- Coordinates: 78.97°N 21.72°E

Administration
- Norway

Kiepert Island (Norwegian: Kiepertøya) is the second-largest of the Bastian Islands in the Svalbard archipelago. It lies east of Wilhelm Island and northeast of Spitsbergen.

The island consists of two parts: an eastern part with a length of about 2.7 kilometers (1.7 mi) with an east–west orientation, and a western part with a length of about 3.5 kilometers (2.2 mi) with a north–south orientation. The two parts are connected by a sandbank. The island is a low basalt cliff that reaches an elevation of 31 meters (102 ft) above sea level in its northeast part, 35 meters (115 ft) to the southwest, and 34 meters (112 ft) to the east. The closest neighboring islands are Deegen Island about 770 meters (2,530 ft) to the west and Tobiesen Island about 2.1 kilometers (1.3 mi) to the south. The wildlife consists largely of polar bears.

The Bastian Islands were discovered in 1867 by the Swedish-Norwegian polar explorer Nils Fredrik Rønnbeck, who was the first to sail around Spitsbergen. Most of the Bastian Islands were named during the First German North Polar Expedition in 1868, led by Carl Koldewey, and this island was named after the German geographer and cartographer Heinrich Kiepert.
