= Hinrich Nitsche =

German zoologist

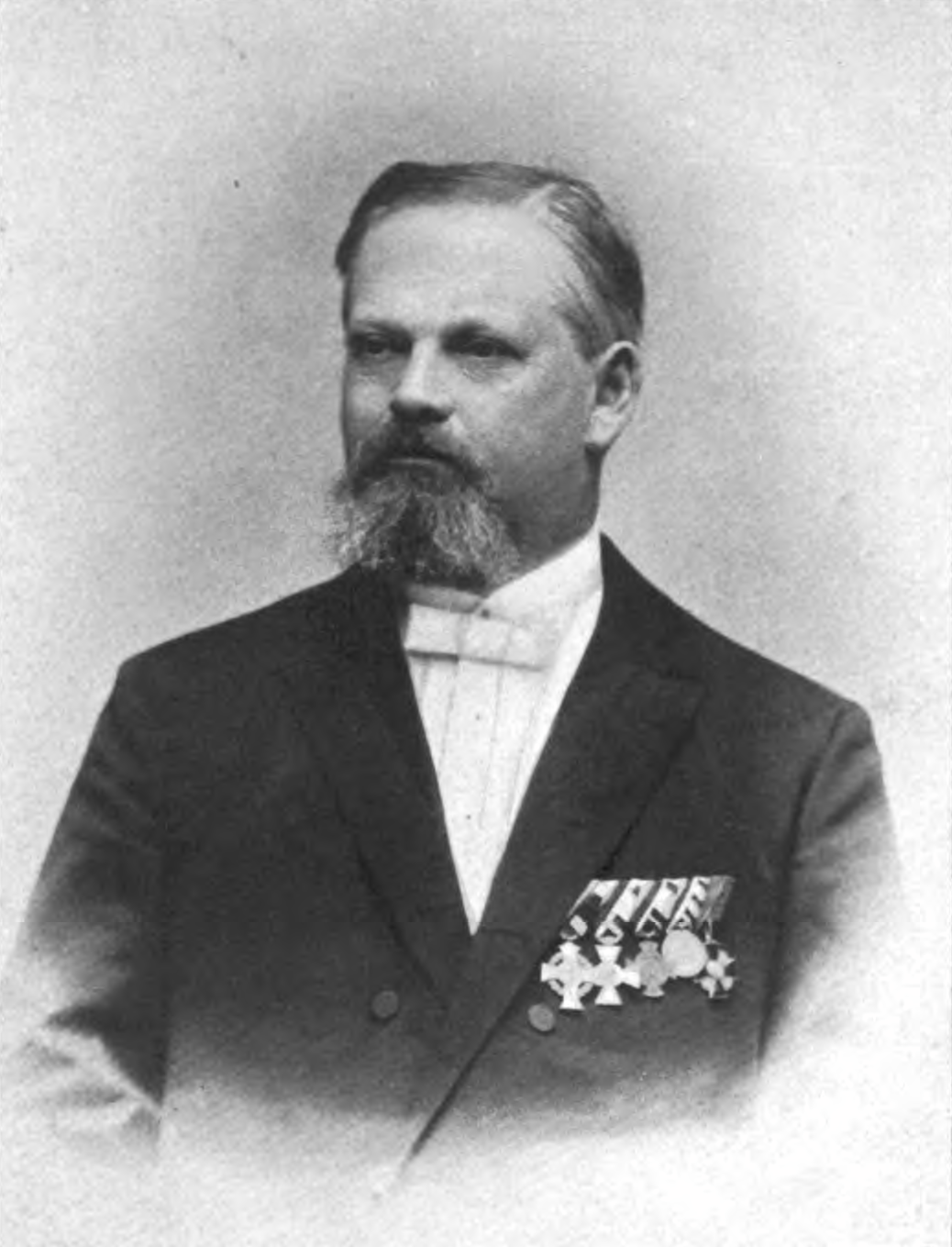
Hinrich Nitsche (1845–1902)

Hinrich Nitsche (14 February 1845 in Breslau – 8 November 1902 in Tharandt) was a German zoologist. He was a son-in-law to geographer Oscar Peschel (1826–1875).

He studied zoology at the Universities of Heidelberg and Berlin, obtaining his doctorate at the latter institution in 1868. After graduation, he worked as an assistant to Rudolf Leuckart at the University of Leipzig. During the Franco-Prussian War, he served as a volunteer medical assistant. In 1875, he became an associate professor of zoology at Leipzig, and during the following year was appointed professor of zoology at the Royal Saxon Academy of Forestry in Tharandt.

In 1869-70 he divided the phylum Bryozoa into two groups, Endoprocta and Ectoprocta, with the latter group of animals being characterized by having its anus outside of the crown of tentacles, as opposed to Endoprocta. Today the term "Ectoprocta" is considered to be synonymous with Bryozoa. The herpetological species Nitsche's bush viper (Atheris nitschei) is named in his honor.

== Selected writings ==
- Beiträge zur Kenntniss der Bryozoen, 1869 – Contributions to the understanding of Bryozoa.
- Erklärungen zu den zoologischen wandtafeln, 1877 (with Rudolf Leuckart and Carl Chun) – Explanations involving zoological wall charts.
- Lehrbuch der mitteleuropäischen Forstinsektenkunde, 1895 (with Johann Friedrich Judeich and Julius Theodor Christian Ratzeburg) – Textbook of Central European forest entomology.
- Die Forstinsekten Mitteleuropas, Ein Lehr- und Handbuch, 1914 (by Karl Escherich, a new edition of Judeich-Nitsche's Lehrbuch der mitteleuropäischen forstinsektenkunde). – Forest entomology of Central Europe.
