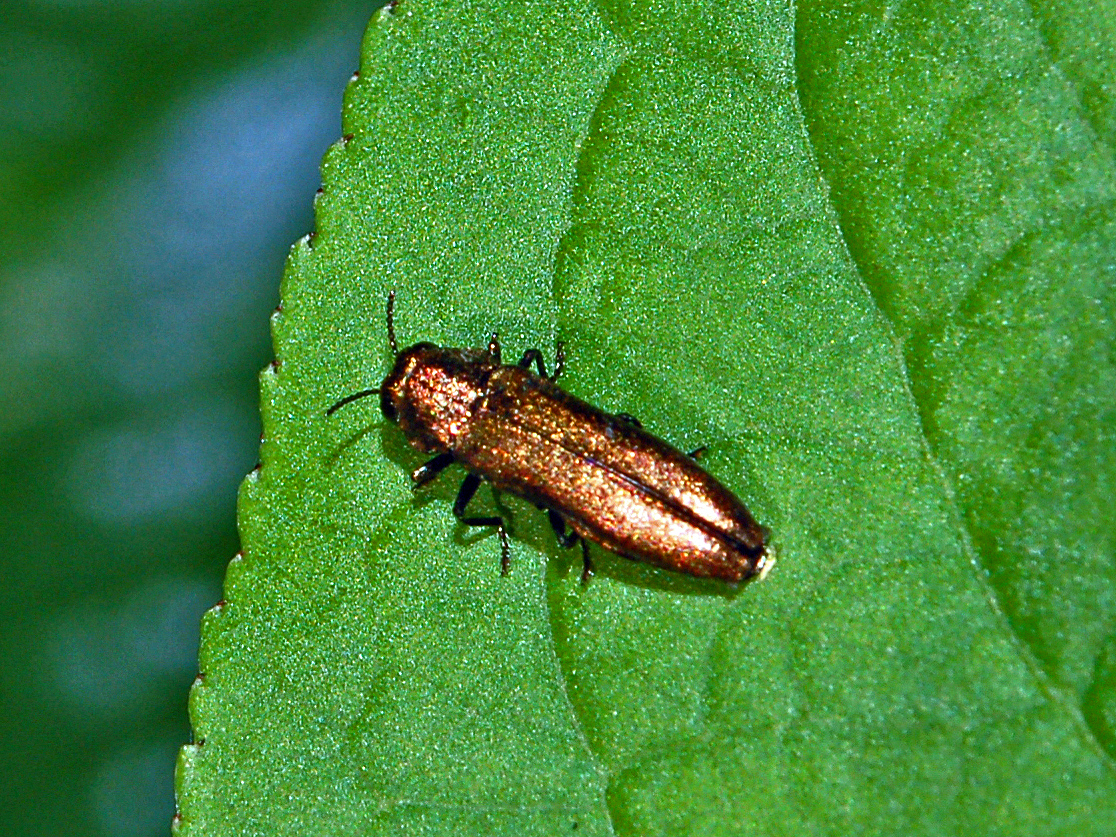
- Agrilus cf. integerrimus

Scientific classification
- Domain: Eukaryota
- Kingdom: Animalia
- Phylum: Arthropoda
- Class: Insecta
- Order: Coleoptera
- Suborder: Polyphaga
- Infraorder: Elateriformia
- Family: Buprestidae
- Genus: Agrilus
- Species: A. integerrimus

Binomial name
- Agrilus integerrimus (Ratzeburg, 1837)

Synonyms
- Agrilus nemeobius Obenberger, 1922

= Agrilus integerrimus =

Species of beetle

Agrilus integerrimus is a species of beetles belonging to the family Buprestidae. It is present in most of Europe.
