= Philipp Phoebus =

German pharmacologist (1804–1880)

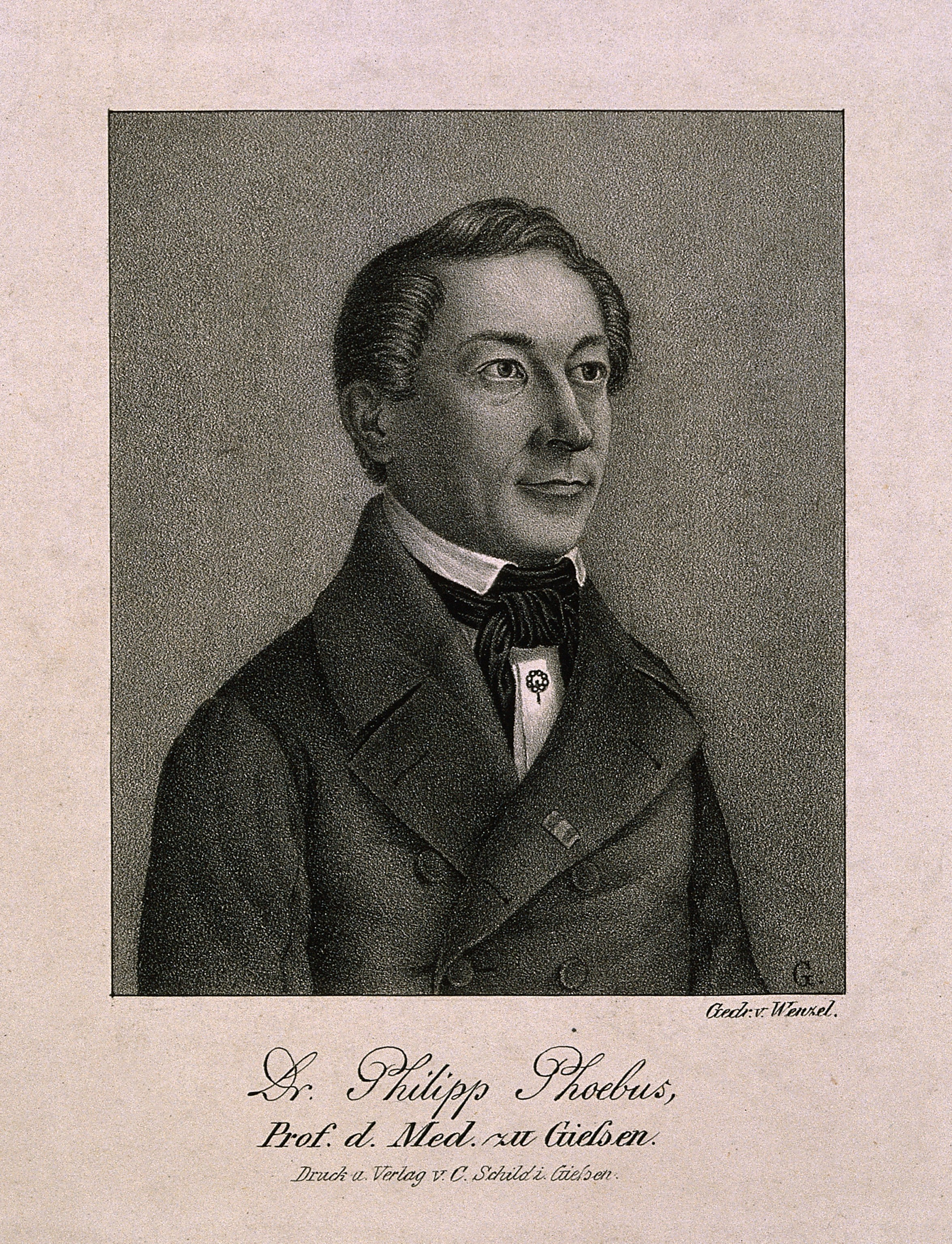
- Born: 23 May 1804; Märkisch-Friedland, West Prussia
- Died: 1 July 1880 (aged 76); Gießen
- Education: University of Berlin
- Known for: Pharmacological and toxicological research
- Scientific career
- Fields: Medicine, Pharmacology
- Author abbrev. (botany): Phoebus

Philipp Phoebus (23 May 1804, Märkisch-Friedland in West Prussia – 1 July 1880, Gießen) was a German medical doctor and pharmacologist.

He studied medicine at the University of Berlin, obtaining his doctorate in 1827. Afterwards he continued his education in Würzburg with Johann Lukas Schönlein (1793-1864) and Karl Friedrich Heusinger (1792-1883), in Paris under Pierre Charles Alexandre Louis (1787-1872) and at Strasbourg, where he focused on anatomical studies. Following travels in Switzerland and northern Italy, he returned to Berlin, where in 1832 he became privat-docent for normal and pathological anatomy.

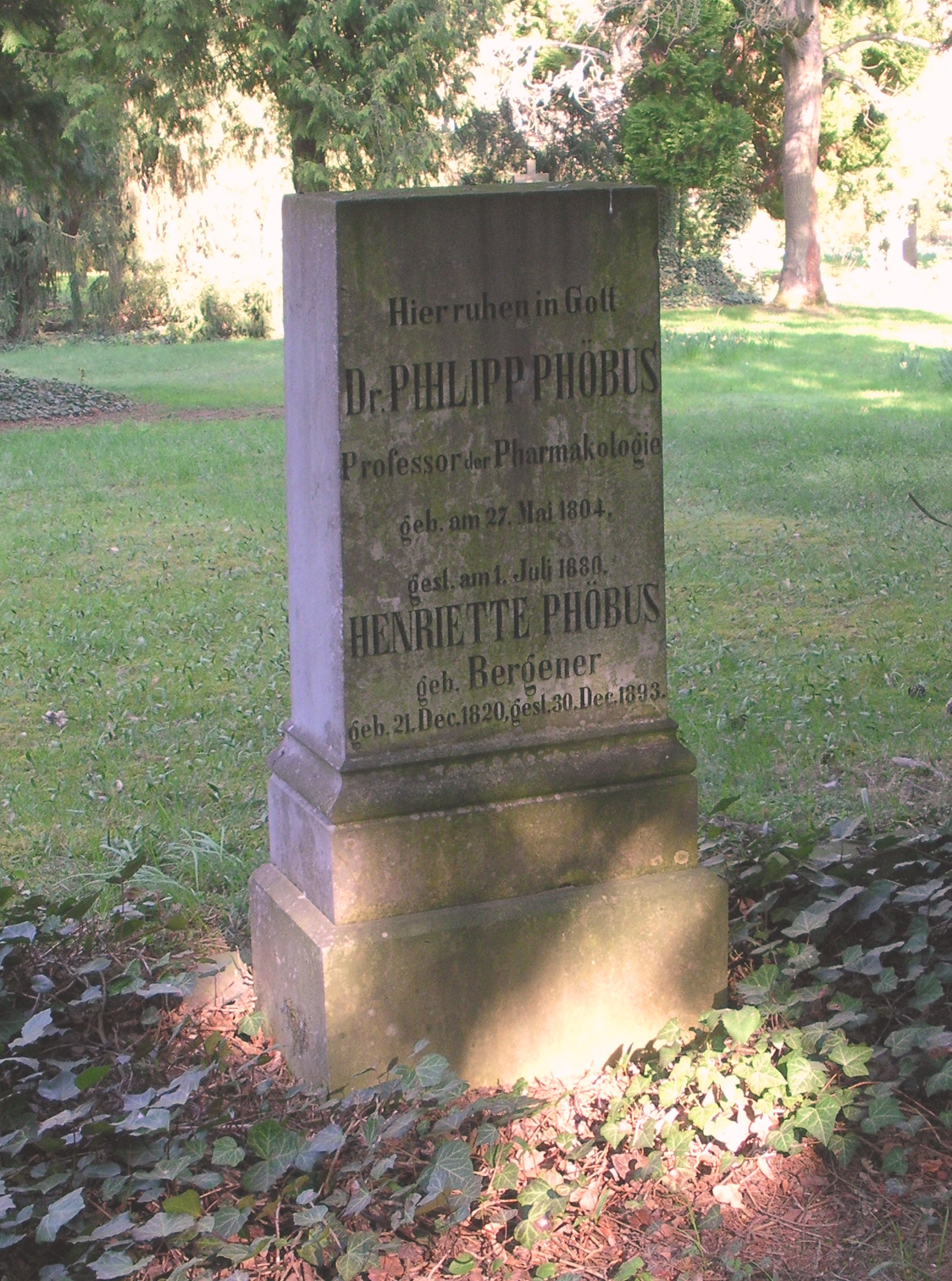
Grave marker of Philipp Phoebus at Alten Friedhof in Gießen.

His interests soon turned to pharmacology. In 1835 he relocated to Stolberg, where along with a medical practice, he conducted pharmacological and toxicological research. In 1843 he was appointed chair of pharmacology at the University of Giessen, a position he held until health reasons forced an early retirement in 1865. Phoebus was one of the 56 founding members of the Freies Deutsches Hochstift (Free German Foundation) in 1859.

During his later years he worked hard for reforms within the pharmacy system. He was an advocate for the training and employment of female pharmacy assistants, and believed in an academic qualification of pharmacists. He also strove (unsuccessfully) for the creation of an international "Pharmacopoeia Europaea".

== Selected writings ==
- Ueber den Leichenbefund bei der orientalischen Cholera, 1833.
- Handbuch der Arzneiverordnungslehre, 1836.
- Abbildung und Beschreibung der in Deutschland wildwachsenden und in Gärten im Freien ausdauernden Giftgewächse, 1838 (with Johann Friedrich von Brandt (1802-1879) and Julius Theodor Christian Ratzeburg (1801-1871).
- Der typische frühsommer-katarrh, oder Das sogenannte heufieber, heu-asthma, 1862.
