= Johann Friedrich Judeich =

German forester

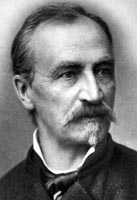
- Born: January 27, 1828; Dresden, Kingdom of Saxony
- Died: March 28, 1894 (aged 66); Tharandt, German Empire
- Education: Royal Saxon Academy of Forestry; University of Leipzig
- Known for: Forestry management and entomology
- Scientific career
- Fields: Forestry

Johann Friedrich Judeich (27 January 1828, Dresden – 28 March 1894, Tharandt) was a German forester.

He studied forestry at the Royal Saxon Academy of Forestry in Tharandt and economics in Leipzig, where he was a pupil of Wilhelm Roscher. From 1849 to 1857, he was associated with the Saxon Forstvermessungs-Anstalt (surveying institute), followed by work as a forestry director in the employ of Count Morzin.

In 1862 he became part of the Böhmischen Forstschulverein (Bohemian Forestry School Association) in Weißwasser, and in 1866 returned to Tharandt as director of the Academy of Forestry, succeeding Carl Heinrich Edmund von Berg (1800–1874). Here he remained as director until his death in 1894.

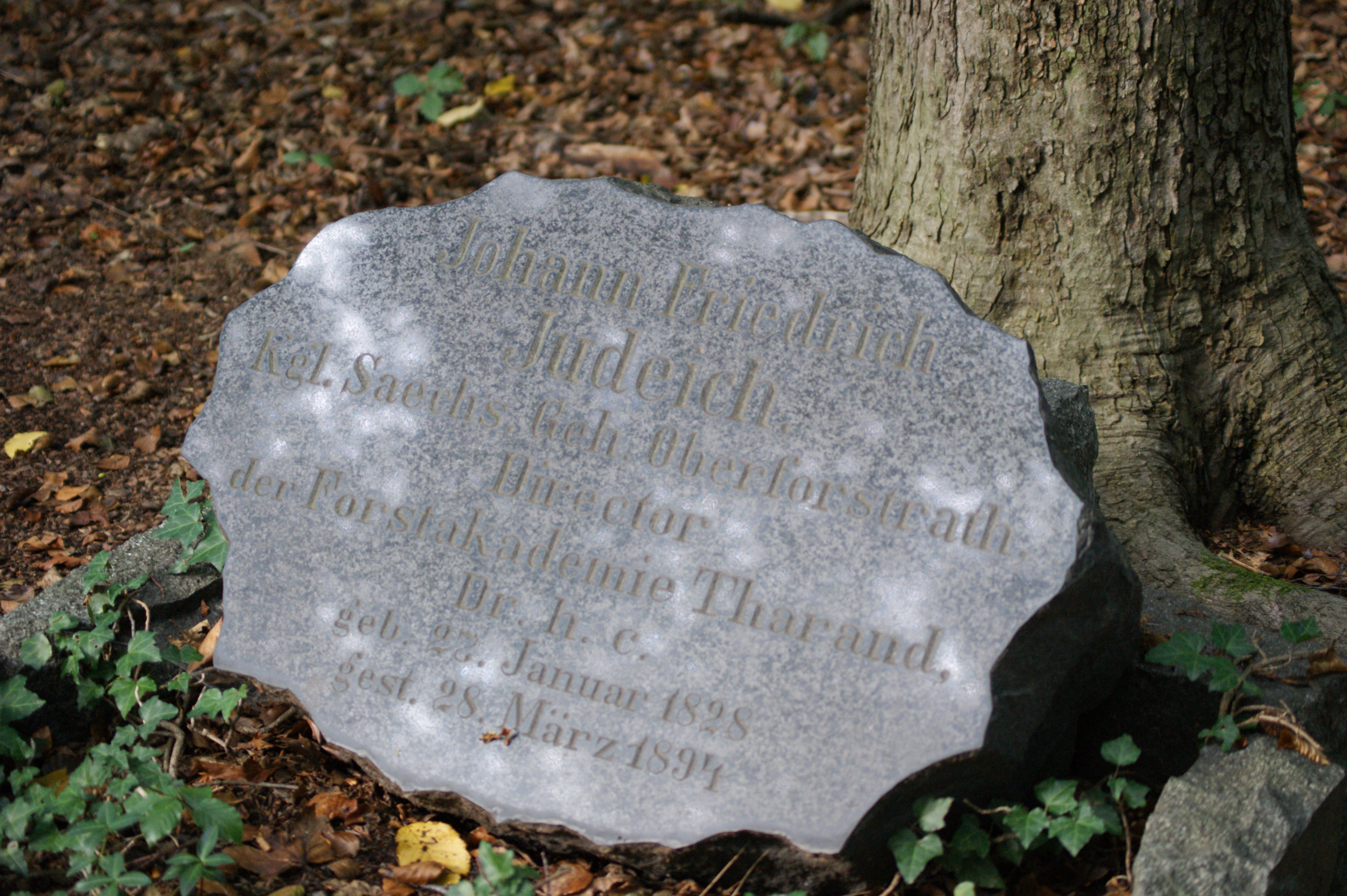
Grave of Johann Friedrich Judeich in Tharandt Forest

== Published works ==
He was the author of Die Forsteinrichtung, a highly regarded work on forest management, first published in 1871 and subsequently issued over several editions. The following are some of the published works associated with Judeich:

- Tharander forstliches Jahrbuch, 1884 – Tharandt forestry yearbook.
- Lehrbuch der mitteleuropäischen Forstinsektenkunde, 1895 (with Hinrich Nitsche and Julius Theodor Christian Ratzeburg) – Textbook of Central European forest entomology.
- Die Forsteinrichtung, 6th edition 1914, (with Max Neumeister) – Forestry management.
- Die forstinsekten Mitteleuropas. Ein lehr- und handbuch, 1914– (by Karl Escherich, a new edition of Judeich-Nitsche's Lehrbuch der mitteleuropäischen forstinsektenkunde). – Forest entomology of Central Europe.
