= Adolf Remelé =

German geologist and mineralogist

Adolf Karl Remelé (17 July 1839, Uerdingen – 16 November 1915, Eberswalde) was a German geologist and mineralogist.

He received his education at the University of Bonn, at the École des Mines in Paris and from the University of Berlin, receiving his doctorate in 1864 with the dissertation "De rubro uranico". In 1867 he qualified as a lecturer at Berlin, and during the following year, succeeded Lothar Meyer at the Forestry Academy in Eberswalde, where he taught classes in chemistry, geognosy and mineralogy.

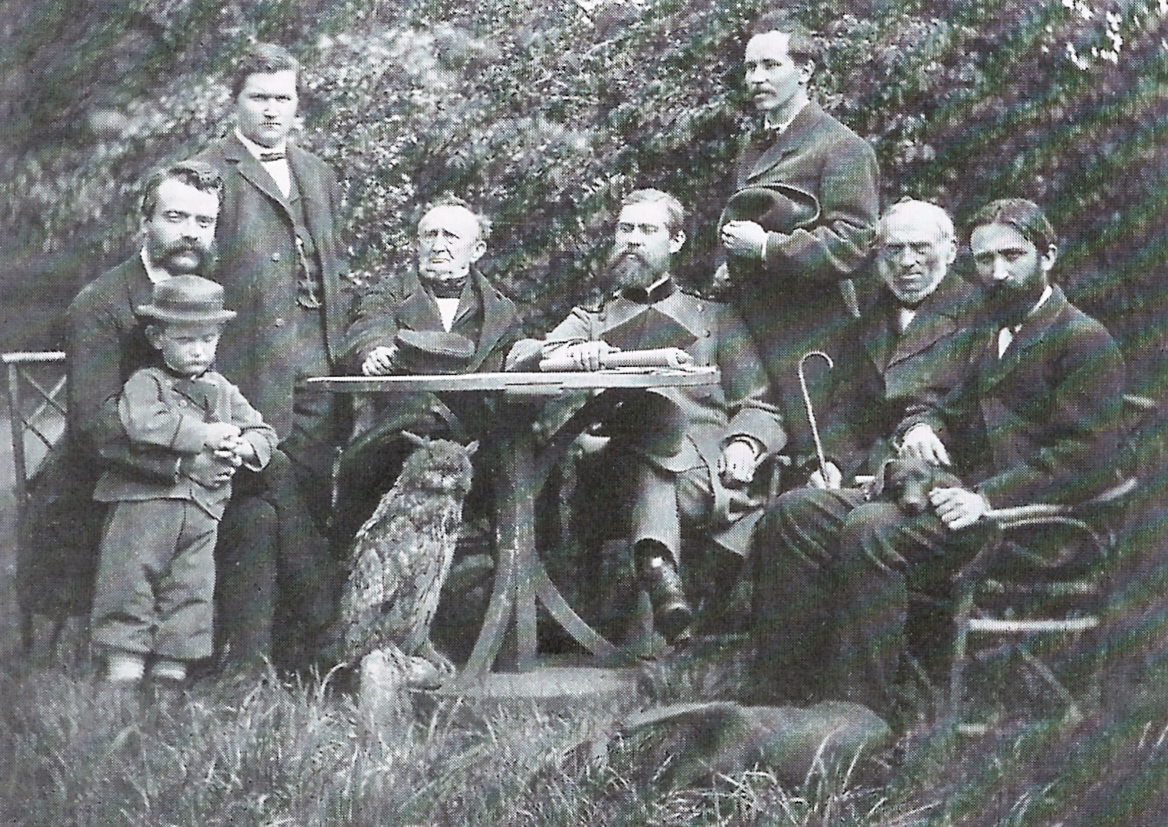
Teachers of the Forestry Academy in Eberswalde (ca. 1868); Adolf Remelé, 3rd figure from the right (standing).

In 1863–66 he published a German translation of Louis-Édouard Rivot's handbook of analytical mineral chemistry as "Handbuch der analytischen Mineralchemie" (2 volumes). Other noted works by Remelé are:

- Ueber die verschiedenen Zustände der Kieselsäure und deren Bildungsweise in der Natur, 1869 – On different conditions of silica and its formations in nature.
- Untersuchungen über die versteinerungsführenden Diluvialgeschiebe des norddeutschen Flachlandes, mit besonderer Berücksichtigung der Mark Brandenburg, 1883 – Studies on the fossiliferous diluvial drift of the North German Plain, with special consideration to Mark Brandenburg.
- Beschreibung und Abbildung einiger gekrümmter Silurcephalopoden aus norddeutschen Diluvialgeschieben, 1889 – Description and illustration of some arcuate Silurian cephalopods from the North German diluvial drift.
