= Staphylococcus lugdunensis =

Scientific classification
- Domain: Bacteria
- Kingdom: Bacillati
- Phylum: Bacillota
- Class: Bacilli
- Order: Bacillales
- Family: Staphylococcaceae
- Genus: Staphylococcus
- Species: S. lugdunensis

Binomial name
- Staphylococcus lugdunensis Freney et al. 1988

Species of bacterium

Staphylococcus lugdunensis is a coagulase-negative member of the genus Staphylococcus, consisting of Gram-positive bacteria with spherical cells that appear in clusters.

== History ==
This species was first described in 1988 after being differentiated through DNA analysis. Its name comes from Lugdunum, the Latin name for Lyon, France, where the organism was first isolated.

== Description ==
Colonies of S. lugdunensis are usually hemolytic, sticky, yellow or tan, and about 2–4 mm in diameter after a 48-hour incubation. Colonies may also give off a bleach-like odor similar to that of Eikenella corrodens. S. lugdunensis may produce a bound coagulase (that is, the enzyme is bound to the cells), a property it shares with S. aureus, but unlike S. aureus, it does not produce a free coagulase. In the laboratory, it can give a positive slide-coagulase test but a negative tube-coagulase test. It is fairly easy to identify because, unlike the great majority of staphylococci, it decarboxylates ornithine and is positive for pyrrolidonyl arylamidase.

In the past, it was frequently misidentified as S. hominis, S. aureus, or other species. It occurs as a commensal on human skin, but has been recorded as a cause of serious human infections, such as osteomyelitis, arthritis, septicaemia, wound infections, and aggressive endocarditis.

S. lugdunensis is generally very susceptible to antistaphylococcal antibiotics, but increasing penicillin resistance has been reported.

== Acute postoperative endophthalmitis ==
Acute postoperative endophthalmitis caused by S. lugdunensis is infrequently reported in clinical studies. Five cases of acute postcataract surgery endophthalmitis were taken from a multicenter prospective study conducted in four university-affiliated hospitals in France (2004 to 2005). These cases were characterized by severe ocular inflammation occurring with a mean delay of 7.6 days after cataract surgery, severe visual loss (hand motions or less in three cases), and dense infiltration of the vitreous. Each of these patients was initially treated by using a standard protocol with intravitreal (vancomycin and ceftazidime), systemic, and topical antibiotics. Given the severity of the endophthalmitis, though bacteria were sensitive to intravitreal antibiotics, pars plana vitrectomy was needed in four cases. The final visual prognosis was complicated by severe retinal detachment in three cases. The microbiological diagnosis was reached by using conventional cultures with specific biochemical tests and eubacterial PCR amplification followed by direct sequencing.

== Clinical features ==
Staphylococcus lugdunensis has been associated with a wide variety of infections, including cardiovascular infections (severe native and prosthetic valve endocarditis, myocarditis, and infected myxoma), empyema, osteomyelitis and prosthetic/native joints infections, skin and soft-tissue infections (furuncles, cellulitis, and abscesses), central nervous infections, peritonitis, endocephalitis, and urinary tract infections.

== See also ==
- Lugdunin
