= Peschl =

Peschl is a German surname. Notable people with the surname include:

- Ernst Peschl (1906–1986), German mathematician
- Markus F. Peschl (born 1965), Austrian philosopher of mind
- Noemi Peschl (born 2000), Swiss synchronized swimmer

== See also ==
- Peschel (disambiguation)
