= Andreas Peschel =

German microbiologist

Andreas Peschel (born 7 June 1962) is a German microbiologist and an expert in bacterial pathogens. Peschel is Head of the Infection Biology Department at the University of Tübingen, Germany.

== Life ==
Peschel grew up in Hagen, studied biology at the University of Bochum and the University of Tübingen, Germany, and graduated in 1990. After gaining his doctorate in biology at the University of Tübingen in 1995, he became a post-doctoral scholar in the Microbial Genetics Department at the University of Tübingen. He worked as a visiting scholar at the Research Center Borstel – Leibniz Center for Medicine and Biosciences, Germany in 1998 and was a post-doctoral scholar at the Medical Microbiology and Immunology Department, University of Utrecht, the Netherlands 1999–2000. He became an assistant and associate professor at the University of Tübingen in 2001 and 2003, respectively. Since 2008 he is a full professor at the Interfaculty Institute of Microbiology and Infection Medicine, part of the University of Tübingen.

== Research ==
Peschel's research focuses on the biology and pathogenicity of the bacterium Staphylococcus aureus, a major cause of severe human infections. Multidrug-resistant S. aureus such as methicillin-resistant S. aureus (MRSA) represent a major cause of morbidity and mortality worldwide, demanding new strategies for prevention and therapy of staphylococcal infections. The symptomless colonization of the human nasal by S. aureus represents a major risk factor for invasive S. aureus infections. Peschel's laboratory pioneered research on the strategies used by S. aureus to colonize the human nasal and elude the immune system to cause infections. In 2016 his team demonstrated that many nasal bacteria produce antimicrobial compounds such as the novel antibiotic lugdunin that may become a foundation for novel drugs against bacterial infections and may be used to prevent pathogen colonization. Peschel is a principal investigator of the German Center for Infection Research (DZIF), which connects basic and translational research on major infectious diseases.

== Awards ==
- German Society for Hygiene and Microbiology, Principal Investigator Award 2010

== Publications ==
- Zipperer A, Konnerth MC, Laux C, Berscheid A, Janek D, Weidenmaier C, Burian M, Schilling NA, Slavetinsky C, Marschal M, Willmann M, Kalbacher H, Schittek B, Brötz-Oesterhelt H, Grond S, Peschel A, Krismer B. 2016. "Human commensals producing a novel antibiotic impair pathogen colonization." Nature 535, 511–516.
- Hanzelmann D, Joo HS, Franz-Wachtel M, Hertlein T, Stevanovic S, Macek B, Wolz C, Götz F, Otto M, Kretschmer D, Peschel A. 2016. "Toll-like receptor 2 activation depends on lipopeptide shedding by bacterial surfactants." Nature Communications 7, 12304
- Tacconelli E, Autenrieth IB, Peschel A. 2017. "Fighting the enemy within." Science 355, 6326–6327.
