= Louis-Édouard Rivot =

Louis-Édouard Rivot (12 October 1820, Paris – 24 February 1869) was a French metallurgist and mining engineer.

He received his education at the École Polytechnique in Paris, and from 1844, taught classes in general chemistry at the École des Mines. In 1853 he succeeded Jacques-Joseph Ebelmen as chair of docimasie (metallurgical analysis) at the École des Mines.

In his research as a metallurgist and mine engineer, his interests were in the practical, as well as in the scientific, aspects of the disciplines. During his career, he investigated mineral deposits and mining operations throughout France, and also in Styria, Transylvania, Hungary, Westphalia, Belgium, the Harz Mountains and a portion of northern Spain. In 1855 he published "Voyage au lac Supérieur" as a result of an expedition to the Lake Superior region in order to investigate its copper mines. In 1974 the book was translated into English by Don H. Clarke, being published with the title, "Voyage to Lake Superior".

== Selected works ==
- Mémoire sur la houillère, les mines et l'usine à zinc de Stolberg (Prusse Rhénane), 1846 – Treatise on the colliery, the zinc mines and factory at Stolberg (Rhenish Prussia).
- Description de la préparation mécanique des minerais de plomb dans le Ober-Harz, 1851 – Description involving the mechanical preparation of lead ores in the Upper Harz.
- Docimasie : Traité d'analyse des substances minérales à l'usage des ingénieurs des mines et des directeurs de mines et d'usines; 1861–66, 4 volumes – Docimasie: Analysis of mineral substances for use by mining engineers and managers of mines and factories.
- Mémoire sur les filons de galène argentifère de Vialas, 1863 – On argentiferous galena veins at Vialas.
- Nouveau procédé de traitement des minéraux d'or et d'argent, 1871 – New processing methods for gold and silver minerals.
- Principes généraux du traitement des minerais métalliques : traité de métallurgie théoretique et pratique; 1871–73, 3 volumes – General principles for the treatment of metal ores : Metallurgy treatise, theoretical and practical.
