= Max Pressler =

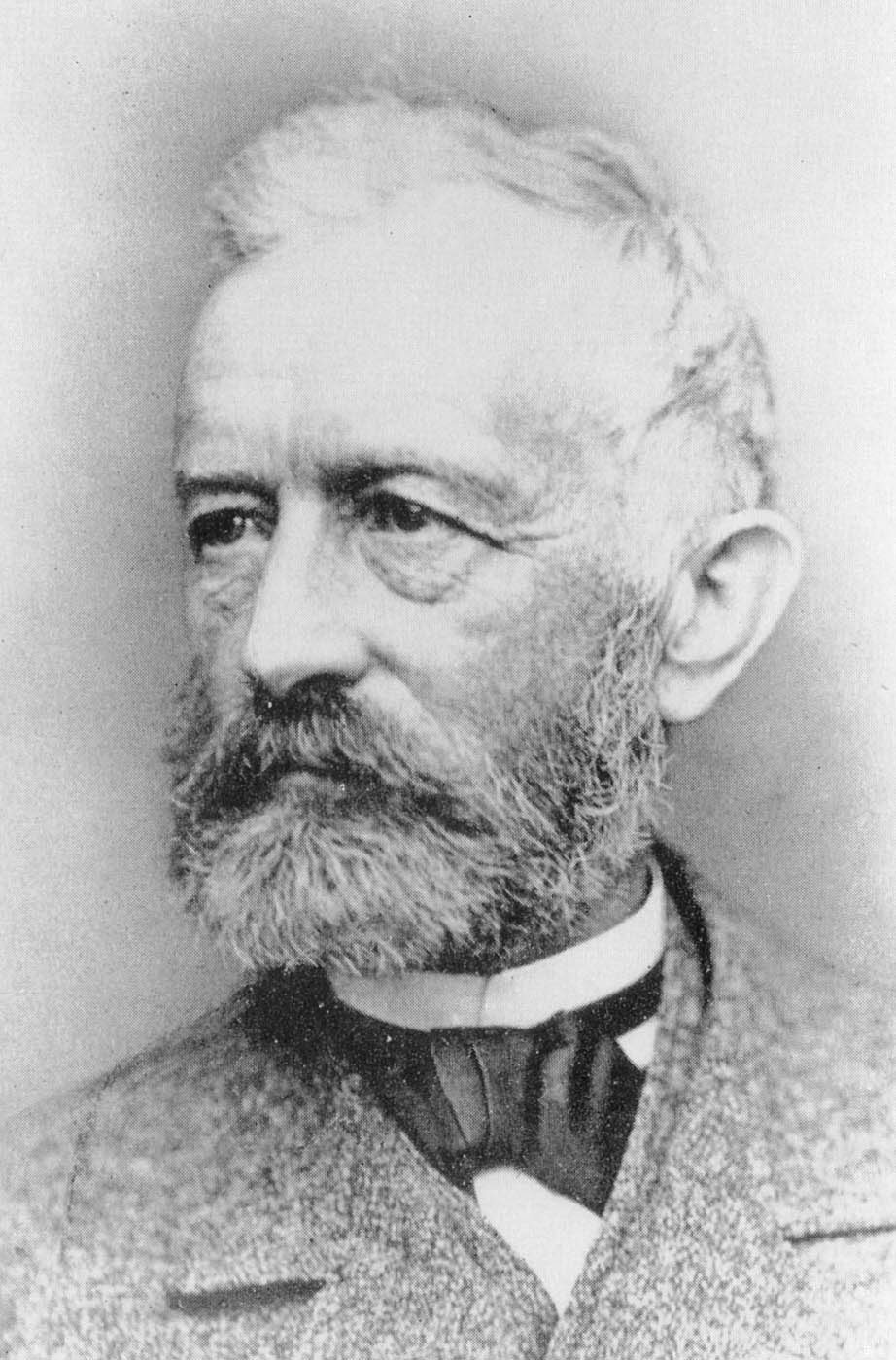

Max Robert Pressler (17 January 1815 – 30 September 1886) was a German forester noted for his inventions and writing.

== Biography ==
He was born in Dresden, and studied at the school of technology there (now called the Dresden University of Technology). He then taught mathematics and polytechnic engineering in Zittau (1836-1840), and was later a professor in the Royal Saxon Academy of Forestry at Tharandt from 1840 until 1883.

Pressler contributed largely to the advance of forestry by his inventions, among which the most important is the “Messknecht” for measuring the height of trees, and by his writings, which are full of novel theories, for the most part based on exact calculation. Der rationelle Waldwirt und sein Nachhaltswaldbau höchsten Reinertrags (“Rational forestry and sustainable management for highest profit,” 1858-85), his chief work, is a protest against the methods of the old school.
