= Lugdunin =

Names
- IUPAC name (1R,4R,7S,10R,13S,16R,19S)-7-(1H-Indol-3-ylmethyl)-10-isobutyl-4,13,16,19-tetraisopropyl-21-thia-3,6,9,12,15,18,23-heptaazabicyclo[18.2.1]tricosane-2,5,8,11,14,17-hexone

Identifiers
CAS Number	1989698-37-4
3D model (JSmol)	Interactive image
ChEBI	CHEBI:133127
ChemSpider	57427231
PubChem CID	121596231
CompTox Dashboard (EPA)	DTXSID801336028
- InChI: InChI=1S/C40H62N8O6S/c1-19(2)15-27-35(50)45-31(21(5)6)38(53)47-32(22(7)8)39(54)48-33(23(9)10)40-44-29(18-55-40)36(51)46-30(20(3)4)37(52)43-28(34(49)42-27)16-24-17-41-26-14-12-11-13-25(24)26/h11-14,17,19-23,27-33,40-41,44H,15-16,18H2,1-10H3,(H,42,49)(H,43,52)(H,45,50)(H,46,51)(H,47,53)(H,48,54)/t27-,28+,29+,30-,31+,32-,33+,40?/m1/s1 Key: QZNGYMKAHFFKCJ-ZBQZSICZSA-N; InChI=1/C40H62N8O6S/c1-19(2)15-27-35(50)45-31(21(5)6)38(53)47-32(22(7)8)39(54)48-33(23(9)10)40-44-29(18-55-40)36(51)46-30(20(3)4)37(52)43-28(34(49)42-27)16-24-17-41-26-14-12-11-13-25(24)26/h11-14,17,19-23,27-33,40-41,44H,15-16,18H2,1-10H3,(H,42,49)(H,43,52)(H,45,50)(H,46,51)(H,47,53)(H,48,54)/t27-,28+,29+,30-,31+,32-,33+,40?/m1/s1 Key: QZNGYMKAHFFKCJ-ZBQZSICZBY
- SMILES: CC(C)C[C@@H]1C(=O)N[C@H](C(=O)N[C@@H](C(=O)N[C@H](C2N[C@@H](CS2)C(=O)N[C@@H](C(=O)N[C@H](C(=O)N1)Cc3c[nH]c4c3cccc4)C(C)C)C(C)C)C(C)C)C(C)C

Properties
Chemical formula	C_{40}H_{62}N_{8}O_{6}S
Molar mass	783.05 g·mol^{−1}
- Except where otherwise noted, data are given for materials in their standard state (at 25 °C [77 °F], 100 kPa). Infobox references

Lugdunin is an investigational antibiotic, classified as a thiazolidine-containing cyclic peptide. It was isolated in 2016 after Staphylococcus lugdunensis was identified as the species of bacteria from the human nose that suppressed growth of species of disease-causing bacteria in that part of the human microbiome.

Lugdunin is a non-ribosomally synthesized cyclic peptide that inhibits growth of Staphylococcus aureus strains. The lugdunin genes are located on a 30-kbp operon. The genes lugA, lugB, lugC, and lugD encode four non-ribosomal peptide synthases, which are preceded by a putative regulator gene lugR.

Gene	locustag	protein size/aa	Genbank protein entry	RefSeq protein entry
lugR	SLUG_RS03935	196	CCB53263.1	WP_002460032.1
lugA	SLUG_RS03940	2374	CCB53264.1	WP_002478842.1
	SLUG_RS03945	124	CCB53265.1	WP_002460029.1
lugB	SLUG_RS03950	1230	CCB53266.1	WP_014533237.1
lugC	SLUG_RS03955	2937	CCB53267.1	WP_002478844.1
lugT	SLUG_RS03960	228	CCB53268.1	WP_002460022.1
lugD	SLUG_RS03965	579	CCB53269.1	WP_002478846.1

== Biosynthesis ==
Lugdunin is synthesized by non ribosomal peptide synthetases in S. lugdunensis. The molecule is a cyclic peptide composed of a thiazolidine heterocycle and three D amino acids. The operon responsible for lugdunin synthesis is approximately 30 kb and contains four nonribosomal peptide synthetase (NRPS) genes. The operon contains a phosphopantetheinyl transferase, monooxygenase, an unknown tailoring enzyme, a regulator gene, and a type II thioesterase. Phosphopantetheinyl transferases carry out the activation of T domains, which act as carrier proteins. Monooxygenases incorporate a single hydroxyl into a lugdunin intermediate. The type II thioesterase is utilized to remove intermediates that stall during biosynthesis.

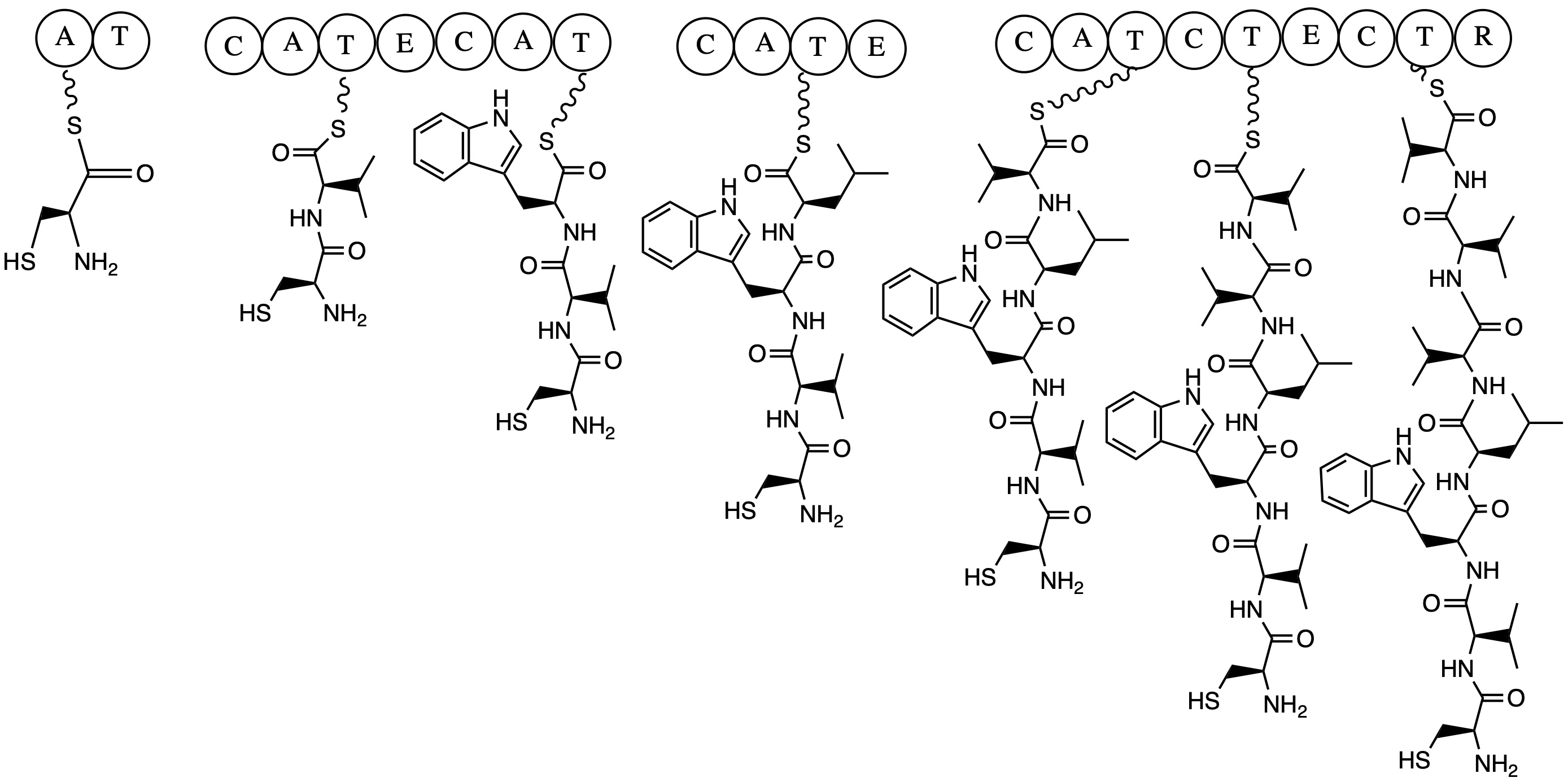
The NRPS synthesis of lugdunin prior to cyclization and thiazolidine formation.

A surprising note about lugdunin is that the operon only encodes five adenylation domains, an interestingly small amount for such a large molecule. This discrepancy is accounted for by the addition of three consecutive valine residues in alternating D and L configurations by LugC. The thiazolidine ring forms following the release of the metabolite via reduction. The N-terminal L-cysteine residue nucleophilically attacks the carbonyl on the C-terminal L-valine residue, thus forming an imine macrocycle. The Schiff base formed in this reaction is then nucleophilically attacked by a cysteine thiol which produces the thiazolidine heterocycle previously described.
