= Oscar Peschel =

German geographer and anthropologist (1826–1875)

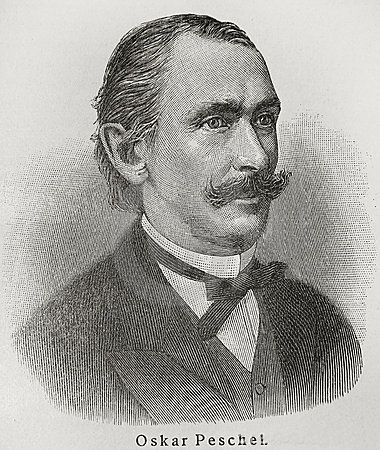
Oscar Ferdinand Peschel (1826–1875)

Oscar Ferdinand Peschel (17 March 1826, Dresden – 13 August 1875, Leipzig) was a German geographer and anthropologist.

== Biography ==
As the son of an officer and teacher at the local military school, Peschel studied law from 1845 to 1848 in Leipzig and Heidelberg. In 1850 he joined the editorial staff of the Augsburger Allgemeine Zeitung. In 1854 he took over the editorship for the journal Das Ausland, of which he continued until the end of March 1871.

In 1871 he became a full professor of the newly established chair of geography at the University of Leipzig. This is thus the fourth oldest chair of geography in Germany after Berlin, Göttingen and Bonn.

Peschel 1858 corresponding member of the Bavarian Academy of Sciences. Shortly before his death he was also a regular member of the Royal Saxon Society of Sciences in Leipzig.

== Racial classification ==
In 1871 he became a full professor of the newly established Chair of Geography at the University of Leipzig, he was also a prominent corresponding member of the Bavarian Academy of Sciences. Peschel is most remembered for his book The Races of Man: and their geographical distribution (1876) which classifies man into seven races: Australoids, (Papuans), (Melanesians), Mongoloids, Dravidians, Bushmen (Capoids), Negroids and Mediterraneans (Caucasoids - the race itself is divided by Peschel into the Hamite, Semite, and Indo-European families).

== Selected works ==
- Geschichte des Zeitalters der Entdeckungen, 1858 - History of the eras of discovery.
- Geschichte der erdkunde, 1865 - History of geography.
- Neue Probleme der vergleichenden Erdkunde als versuch einer Morphologie de Erdoberfläche, 1870 - New problems of comparative geography in regards to the morphology of the Earth's surface.
- Völkerkunde, 1874 - Ethnology.
- "The races of man : and their geographical distribution", 1876.
- Abhandlungen zur Erd- und Völkerkunde, 1877 - On geography and ethnology.

== Legacy ==
Peschel Island in the Svalbard archipelago is named after Peschel.

== See also ==
- The Races of Mankind
