= Julius Theodor Christian Ratzeburg =

German entomologist & zoologist (1801–1871)

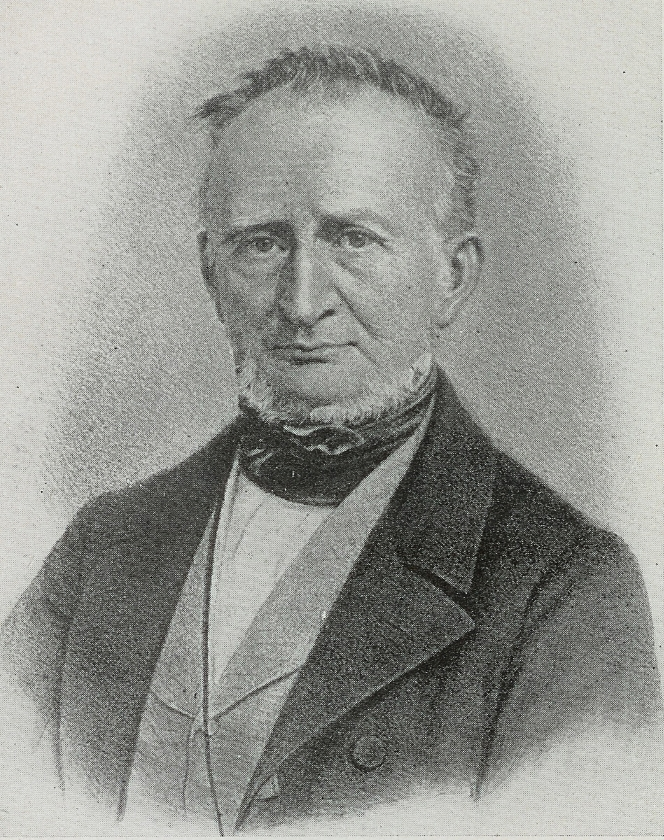
Julius Theodor Christian Ratzeburg.

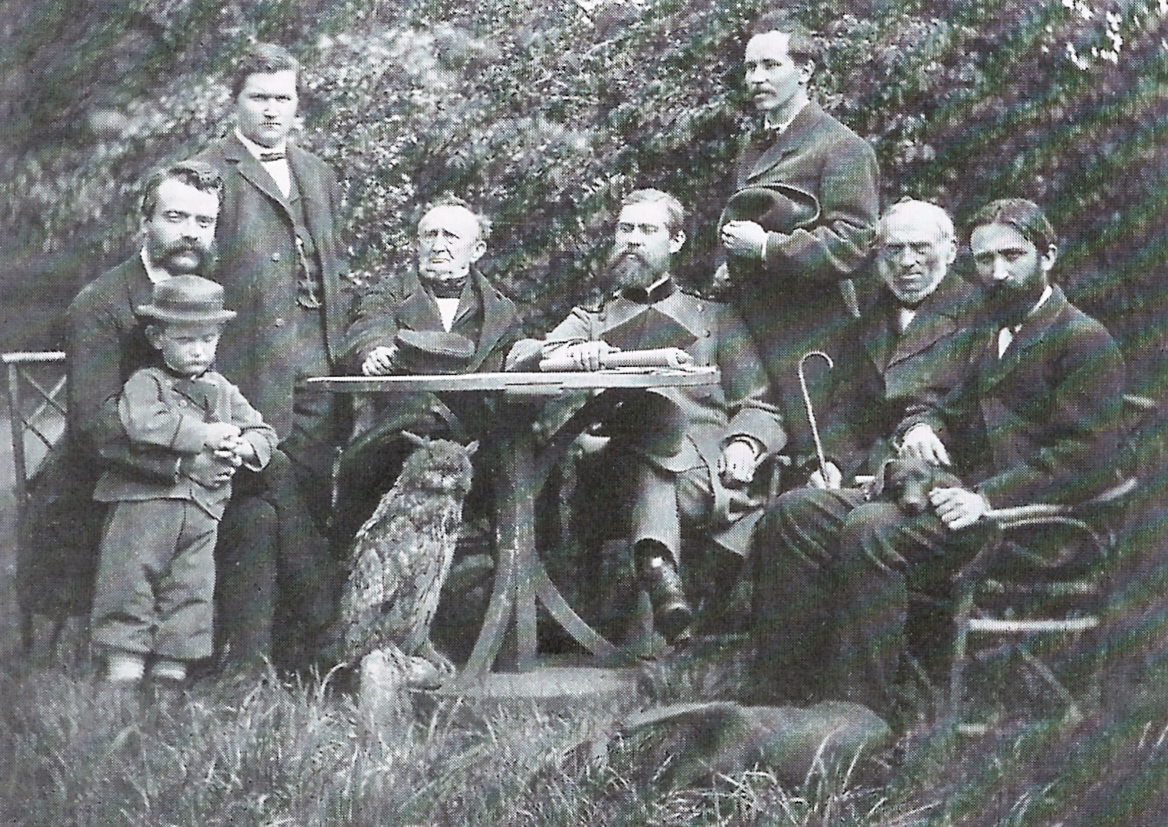
Teachers of the school of forestry in Neustadt-Eberswalde around 1868 (from left): Robert Hartig (embracing Peter Danckelmann), unknown, Julius Theodor Christian Ratzeburg, Bernhard Danckelmann, Adolf Remelé, Wilhelm Schneider and Wilhelm Schütze

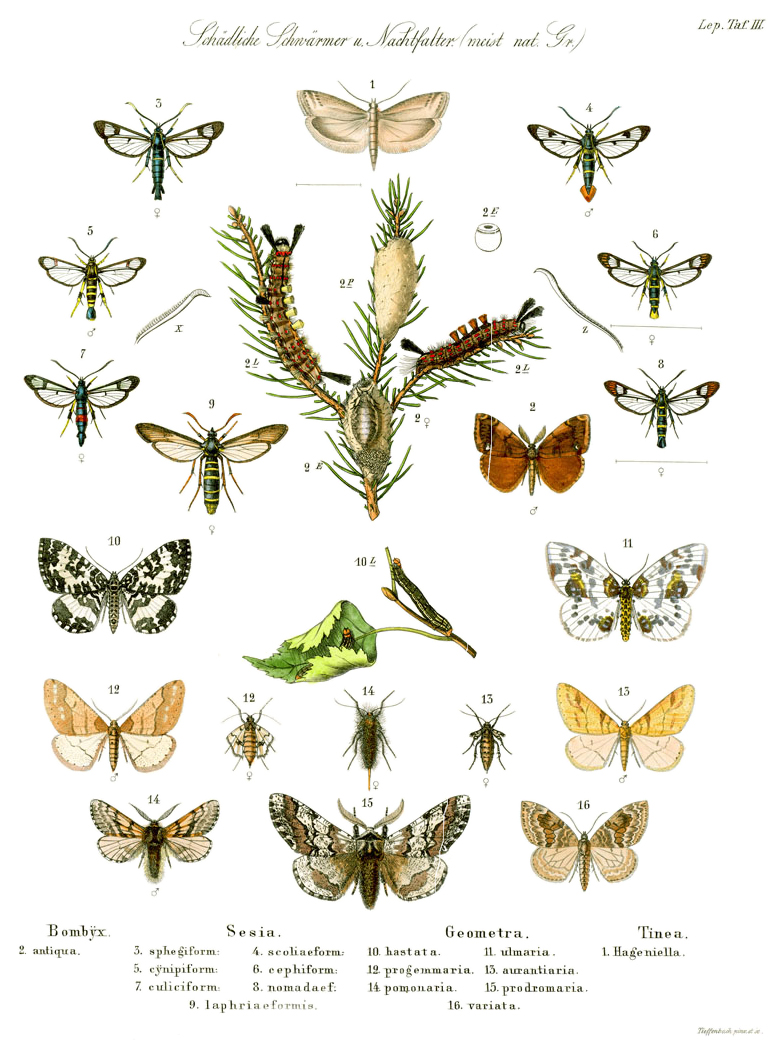
Image from Die Waldverderber und ihre Feinde

Julius Theodor Christian Ratzeburg (16 February 1801– 24 October 1871) was a German zoologist, botanist, entomologist, and forester.

== Biography ==
Ratzeburg was born in Berlin, the son of a professor at the veterinary school of the University of Berlin. He studied medicine and natural sciences in Berlin and was primarily interested in botany. He became a private lecturer at the University of Berlin in 1828, when he was in contact with Alexander and Wilhelm von Humboldt. Two years later, he became professor of natural history there at the invitation of Friedrich Wilhelm Leopold Pfeil (1783-1859). He founded the botanic garden of forestry at Eberswalde, working there until his retirement in 1869. He returned to Berlin, where he resided until his death.

Ratzeburg was the author of important works on forestry and forest entomology, and is considered the founder of the latter discipline. He was notably interested in parasitic species. From 1827 to 1834, he wrote Medizinische Zoologie (Medical zoology) with Johann Friedrich von Brandt, which was a standard work for many years.

== Selected works ==
=== Entomological works ===
- Die Forstinsekten, Berlin 1837–1844, three volumes and a supplement.; re-edition at Vienna 1885.
- Die Waldverderber und ihre Feinde, Berlin, 1841, 8th re-edition of Johann Friedrich Judeich (1828–1894) and Hinrich Nitsche (1845–1902) under the title Lehrbuch der mitteleuropäischen Insektenkunde, Vienna, 1885, with a biography.
- Die Ichneumonen der Forstinsekten, Berlin 1844–1852, three volumes. The parts are:
  - Ratzeburg, J.T.C. 1844 (March 31), Die Ichneumonen der Forstinsekten in entomologischer und forstlicher Beziehung 1:224pp, 4 plates', Berlin.
  - Ratzeburg, J.T.C. 1844 (August 31), Die Ichneumonen der Forstinsekten in entomologischer und forstlicher Beziehung 3:viii+314pp, 16 plates, Berlin
  - Ratzeburg, J.T.C. 1848, Die Ichneumonen der Forstinsekten in entomologischer und forstlicher Beziehung 2:vi+238pp, 4 tables, 3 plates, Berlin
  - Ratzeburg, J.T.C. 1852, Die Ichneumonen der Forstinsekten in entomologischer und forstlicher Beziehung 3:v–xviii+272pp, 3 tables, Berlin
- Die Nachkrankheiten und die Reproduktion der Kiefer nach dem Fraß der Forleule, Berlin, 1862.
- Die Waldverderbnis oder dauernder Schaden, welcher durch Insektenfraß, Schälen etc. an lebenden Waldbäumen entsteht, Berlin, 1866–1868, two volumes.

=== Other subjects ===
- Handbuch der Zoopharmakologie für Thierärzte . Vol. 1&2 . Berlin 1801 Digital edition by the University and State Library Düsseldorf
- Medizinische Zoologie, avec Brandt, Berlin, 1827–1834, two volumes.
- Abbildung und Beschreibung der in Deutschland wild wachsenden Giftgewächse, with Johann Friedrich von Brandt (1802-1879) and Philipp Phoebus (1804-1880), Berlin 1834; new edition in 1838.
- Forstnaturwissenschaftliche Reisen, Berlin 1842.
- Die Standortsgewächse und Unkräuter Deutschlands, Berlin 1859.
- Forstwissenschaftliches Schriftstellerlexikon, Berlin 1872–1873.

In addition, Julius Theodor Christian Ratzeburg continued Friedrich Gottlob Hayne's work Getreue Darstellung und Beschreibung der in der Arzneykunde gebräuchlichen Gewächse.

- Getreue Darstellung und Beschreibung der in der Arzneykunde gebräuchlichen Gewächse wie auch solcher, welche mit ihnen verwechselt werden können. 12 Volumes, 1805–1856 (continued from Johann Friedrich Brandt, Julius Theodor Christian Ratzeburg und Johann Friedrich Klotzsch). Digital Edition by the University and State Library Düsseldorf
