= Cape Weyprecht =

Headland in Spitsbergen, Svalbard

- Cape
- Location in Svalbard
- Coordinates: 78°54′N 20°56′E
- Location: Spitsbergen, Svalbard, Norway

Cape Weyprecht (Norwegian: Kapp Weyprecht) is a headland in the northeast part of Spitsbergen in Svalbard, in the area known as Olav V Land.

The cape is named after Karl Weyprecht, an Austro-Hungarian officer and polar explorer. Together with Julius von Payer, he led the Austro-Hungarian North Pole Expedition that discovered Franz Josef Land in 1873. Weyprecht himself was never on Svalbard.

About 2 kilometers (1.2 mi) east of Cape Weyprecht lie Mack Island, Torkildsen Island, and Isaksen Island, all part of the Rønnbeck Islands.
