= Bastian Islands =

Island group in Svalbard, Norway

Native name: Bastianøyane
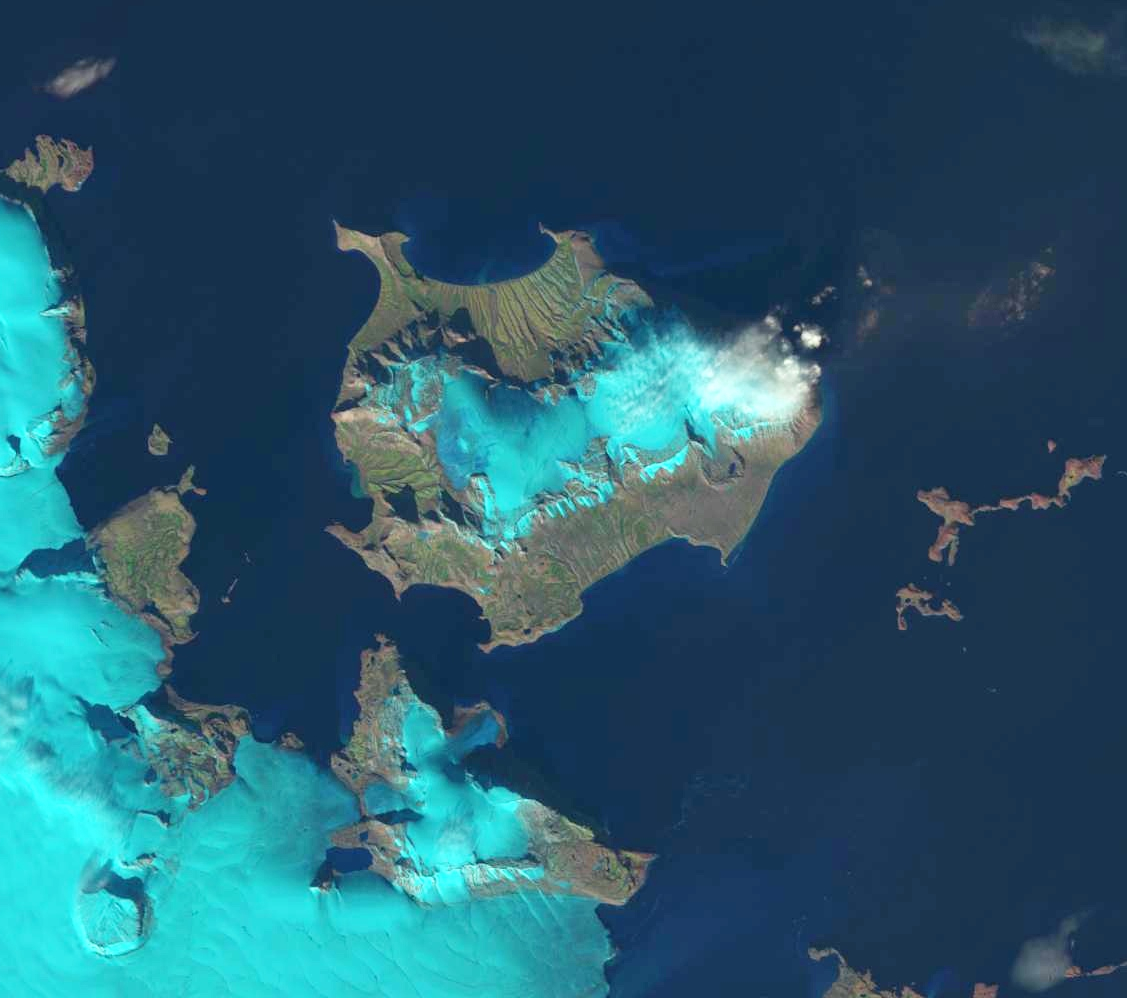
- Part of the Bastian Islands (located east of Wilhelm Island), you can see the islands of Lange Island, Ehrenberg Island and Peschel Island.

- Location within Svalbard

Geography
- Coordinates: 78.9903°N 21.3411°E

Administration
- Norway

The Bastian Islands (Norwegian: Bastianøyane) are a group of islands in Hinlopen Strait, Svalbard. The islands are located southeast of Wilhelm Island.

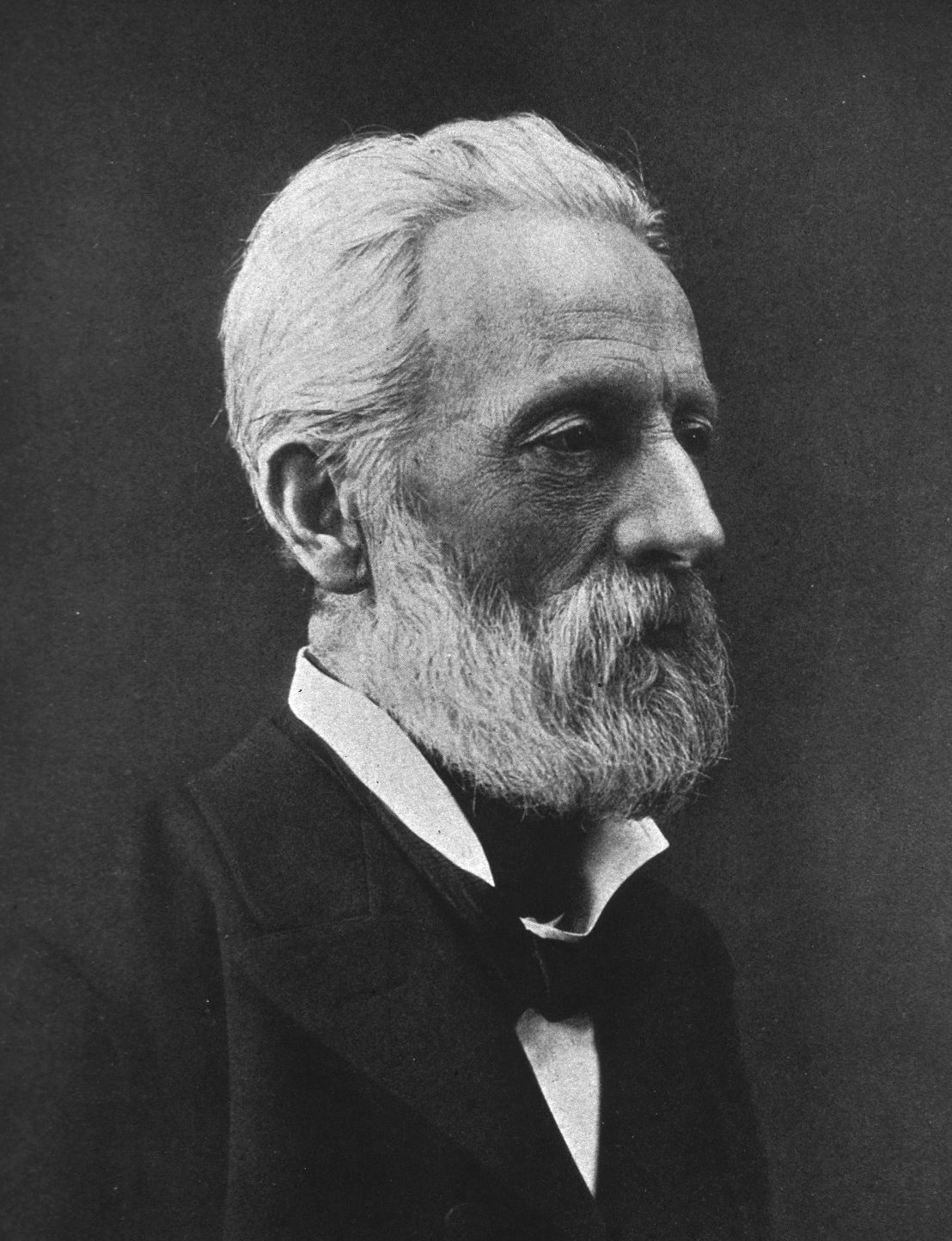
The island group is named after Adolf Bastian.

The islands are named after German explorer Adolf Bastian. The Bastian Islands are the northern islands of a larger group, and the southern islands of this group are called the Rønnbeck Islands.
