= Rønnbeck Islands =

Island group in Svalbard, Norway

Native name: Rønnbeckøyane
- Location within Svalbard

Geography
- Coordinates: 78.9349°N 21.3607°E

Administration
- Norway

The Rønnbeck Islands (Norwegian: Rønnbeckøyane) are a group of islands in Hinlopen Strait, Svalbard. They are located south of the Bastian Islands, southeast of Wilhelm Island. The islands are named after Norwegian sailor and seal hunter Nils Fredrik Rønnbeck.
