= Wilhelm Island =

Island

Native name: Wilhelmøya
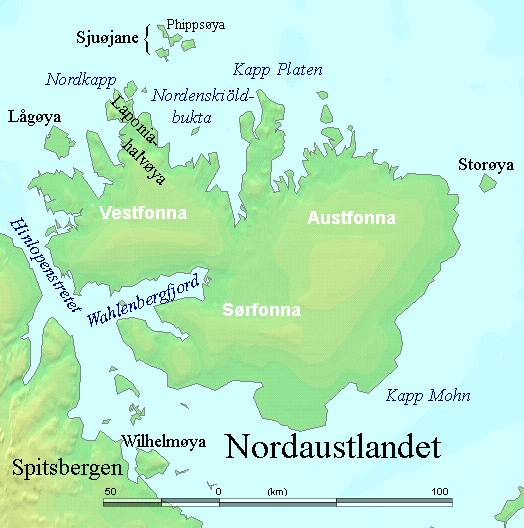
- Wilhelm Island in lower left
- Interactive map of Wilhelm Island

Geography
- Location: Arctic Ocean
- Coordinates: 79°3′N 20°25′E
- Archipelago: Svalbard
- Area: 120 km^{2} (46 sq mi)
- Highest elevation: 566 m (1857 ft)

Administration
- Norway

Demographics
- Population: 0

Wilhelm Island (Norwegian: Wilhelmøya) is an island in the Svalbard archipelago. It is situated northeast of Olav V Land on Spitsbergen, in Hinlopen Strait. Its area is 120 km². About 33.5 % of the island is covered with ice. The island was named after Wilhelm I.

== See also ==
- List of islands of Norway
