= Nils Fredrik Rønnbeck =

Swedish-Norwegian polar skipper and ice pilot

Nils Fredrik Røn(n)beck (Swedish: Rönnbäck, March 22, 1820 – January 4, 1891) was a Swedish-Norwegian polar skipper and ice pilot. He discovered Franz Josef Land in 1865.

== Life ==
Rønnbeck was born Nils Johansson Söderlund in Storön in Kalix, in Norrbotten County, Sweden, the third child of Johan Olofsson Söderlund and Anna Lisa Olofsdotter. In 1830 the family moved from Storön to Kamlunge, also located in Kalix, and adopted the farm name Rönnbäck as the family's surname. At age 17, Rønnbeck made his way to Haparanda and then traveled via Karesuando, Kautokeino, and Alta to Hammerfest in 1838 by following the old 80-Norwegian mile (i.e., 900 kilometers or 560 miles) river route to Norway. In the 1830s there were several consecutive crop failures in Norrbotten, and many people sought their fortunes in Norway, where there were better job opportunities related to fishing and seal hunting.

Rønnbeck was married twice, both times to women of Swedish origin, and he had ten children, five with each wife. He married Marie Caroline Eriksdatter (born 1828 in Övertorneå) in 1847. She died in 1863, at age 35, and none of their offspring survived childhood. He married again in 1864, to Marie Lovise Johannesdatter Strömbeck (born 1841 in Talvik), whose father had immigrated from Sweden and was employed at the copper works in Kåfjord. Two of their children also died at a young age, and the three that reached adulthood died childless.

Rønnbeck prospered in Hammerfest, and by 1841 he owned his own ship. In 1865, while sailing the schooner Spitsbergen, he discovered Franz Josef Land, which he dubbed "Northeast Spitsbergen" (Norwegian: Nordøst Spitsbergen).

Rønnbeck died on January 4, 1891, when he slipped on a rock in the harbor in Hammerfest and drowned. At the time of his death, he was almost 71 years old, but for unknown reasons his year of birth was listed as 1814 (with 1824 crossed out) in the church funeral records. This is despite the fact that both of his marriages were held in the same church, where his birth date of March 22, 1820, is recorded.

== Legacy ==
The Rønnbeck Islands are named after Rønnbeck.
