= Metriopepla =

Scientific classification
- Kingdom: Animalia
- Phylum: Arthropoda
- Clade: Pancrustacea
- Class: Insecta
- Order: Coleoptera
- Suborder: Polyphaga
- Infraorder: Cucujiformia
- Family: Chrysomelidae
- Subfamily: Cassidinae
- Tribe: Basiprionotini
- Genus: Metriopepla; Fairmaire, 1882
- Species: M. inornata

Binomial name
- Metriopepla inornata (Waterhouse, 1877)

Synonyms
- Epistictia inornata; Epistictia quadripunctata; M. lividula

Genus of leaf beetles

Metriopepla is a monotypic genus of leaf beetles in the subfamily Cassidinae. It contains one species, Metriopepla inornata, that is distributed in the Democratic Republic of the Congo, Ethiopia, Ivory Coast, Malawi, Mozambique, South Africa, Tanzania and Zambia.
