= Macrolycus =

Scientific classification
- Kingdom: Animalia
- Phylum: Arthropoda
- Class: Insecta
- Order: Coleoptera
- Suborder: Polyphaga
- Infraorder: Elateriformia
- Family: Lycidae
- Tribe: Macrolycini
- Genus: Macrolycus; Waterhouse, 1878

Genus of beetles

Macrolycus is a genus of net-winged beetles in the family Lycidae.

== Selected species ==
- Subgenus Macrolycus
- Subgenus Cerceros Kraatz, 1879
  - Macrolycus gracilis group
    - Macrolycus acutiapex Y. Yang, Liu & X. Yang, 2025
    - Macrolycus aurantiacus Kazantsev, 2001
    - Macrolycus baihualingensis Li, Bocak & Pang, 2015
    - Macrolycus breviramus Y. Yang, Du & Liu, 2025
    - Macrolycus gracilis Pic, 1923
    - Macrolycus graciliramus Y. Yang, Du & Liu, 2025
    - Macrolycus lizipingensis Li, Bocak & Pang, 2015
    - Macrolycus mucronatus Li, Bocak & Pang, 2012
    - Macrolycus multicostatus Kazantsev, 2002
    - Macrolycus muyuensis Li, Bocak & Pang, 2012
    - Macrolycus nigricollis Y. Yang, Liu & X. Yang, 2025
    - Macrolycus phoeniceus Li, Bocak & Pang, 2015
    - Macrolycus rhodoneurus Li, Bocak & Pang, 2015
    - Macrolycus rosaceus Li, Bocak & Pang, 2015
