= Acrossoides yorkensis =

Scientific classification
- Kingdom: Animalia
- Phylum: Arthropoda
- Clade: Pancrustacea
- Class: Insecta
- Order: Coleoptera
- Suborder: Polyphaga
- Infraorder: Scarabaeiformia
- Family: Scarabaeidae
- Genus: Acrossoides
- Species: A. yorkensis

Binomial name
- Acrossoides yorkensis (Waterhouse, 1892)

Synonyms
- Aphodius yorkensis Waterhouse, 1892

Species of beetle

Acrossoides yorkensis is a species of beetle of the family Scarabaeidae. It is found in Australia (South Australia).

== Description ==
Adults reach a length of about 10–14 mm (0.39–0.55 in). They have an orange-brown to castaneous, shining body.
