= Pleuraphodius lewisi =

Scientific classification
- Kingdom: Animalia
- Phylum: Arthropoda
- Clade: Pancrustacea
- Class: Insecta
- Order: Coleoptera
- Suborder: Polyphaga
- Infraorder: Scarabaeiformia
- Family: Scarabaeidae
- Genus: Pleuraphodius
- Species: P. lewisi

Binomial name
- Pleuraphodius lewisi (Waterhouse, 1875)

Synonyms
- Aphodius lewisi Waterhouse, 1875

Species of beetle

Pleuraphodius lewisi is a species of beetle of the family Scarabaeidae. It is found in China (Beijing, Fujian, Guangxi, Nei Mongol), India (Uttarakhand), Japan, Korea, Nepal, Taiwan, Australia (Queensland), Indonesia, Malaysia (Sabah) and Sri Lanka.

== Description ==
Adults reach a length of about 2.8–3.2 mm (0.11–0.13 in). They have a yellowish brown to reddish brown, dull body, with tiny pubescence on the dorsal surface.
