= Serica boops =

Scientific classification
- Kingdom: Animalia
- Phylum: Arthropoda
- Class: Insecta
- Order: Coleoptera
- Suborder: Polyphaga
- Infraorder: Scarabaeiformia
- Family: Scarabaeidae
- Genus: Serica
- Species: S. boops

Binomial name
- Serica boops Waterhouse, 1875

Synonyms
- Ophthalmoserica niijimai Kontkanen, 1956

Species of beetle

Serica boops is a species of beetle of the family Scarabaeidae. It is found in Japan.

== Description ==
Adults reach a length of about 8 mm. They have an brownish-testaceous, oblong-ovate, subopaque body. The head is piceous-black, with the front discretely punctate.
