= Prosopodonta dorsata =

Scientific classification
- Kingdom: Animalia
- Phylum: Arthropoda
- Class: Insecta
- Order: Coleoptera
- Suborder: Polyphaga
- Infraorder: Cucujiformia
- Family: Chrysomelidae
- Genus: Prosopodonta
- Species: P. dorsata

Binomial name
- Prosopodonta dorsata (Baly, 1885)

Synonyms
- Cheirispa dorsata Baly, 1885

Species of beetle

Prosopodonta dorsata is a species of beetle of the family Chrysomelidae. It is found in Colombia, Costa Rica, Nicaragua and Panama.

== Description ==
The face between the antennae has a longitudinal ridge, its lower half usually produced into a recurved horn, the apex of which is sometimes dilated and truncate. The antennae are filiform and slightly thickened towards the apex. The thorax is broader than long, the sides nearly straight and parallel, usually slightly angulate in the middle, rounded and converging towards the apex. The disc is smooth and punctate on the sides. The elytra are oblong and convex, the humeral callus laterally prominent, but not compressed as in Prosopodonta distincta. The surface is regularly punctate-striate, the striae on the sides and at the apex sulcate. The anterior pair of legs is simple.

== Biology ==
The recorded food plants are Costus species, Chamaedorea wendlandiana, Cryosophila warscewiczii and Oenocarpus panamanus.
