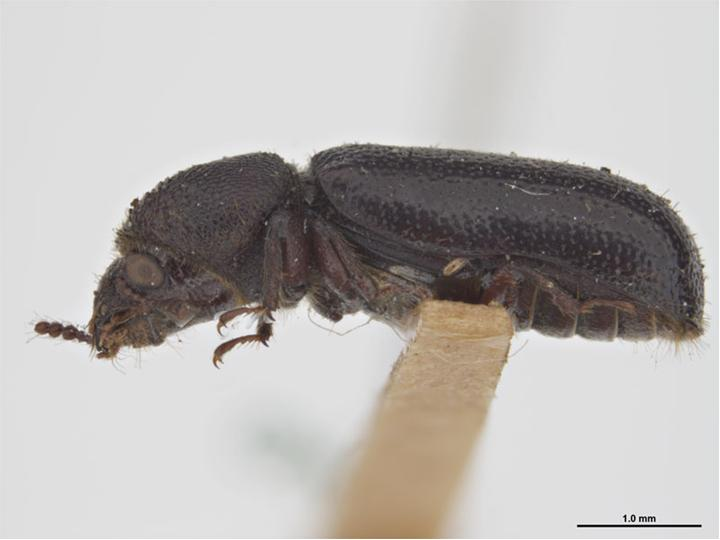
- Stephanopachys cribratus

Scientific classification
- Kingdom: Animalia
- Phylum: Arthropoda
- Class: Insecta
- Order: Coleoptera
- Suborder: Polyphaga
- Family: Bostrichidae
- Subfamily: Dinoderinae
- Genus: Stephanopachys; Waterhouse, 1888

= Stephanopachys =

Genus of beetles

Stephanopachys is a genus of horned powder-post beetles in the family Bostrichidae. There are more than 20 described species in Stephanopachys.

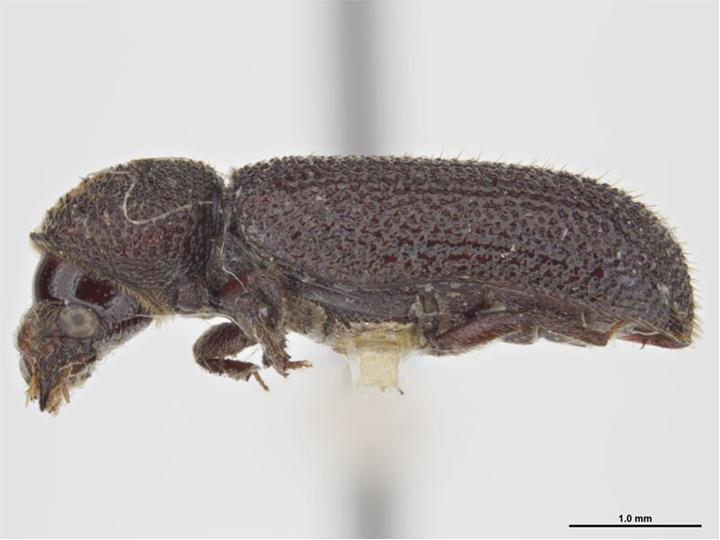
Stephanopachys substriatus

== Species ==
These 21 species belong to the genus Stephanopachys:

- Stephanopachys ambericus Zahradník & Háva, 2015
- Stephanopachys amplus (Casey, 1898)
- Stephanopachys asperulus (Casey, 1898)
- Stephanopachys brunneus (Wollaston, 1862)
- Stephanopachys conicola Fisher, 1950
- Stephanopachys cribratus (LeConte, 1866)
- Stephanopachys densus (LeConte, 1866)
- Stephanopachys dugesi Lesne, 1939
- Stephanopachys electron Zahradník & Háva, 2015
- Stephanopachys himalayanus Lesne, 1932
- Stephanopachys hispidulus (Casey, 1898)
- Stephanopachys linearis (Kugelann, 1792)
- Stephanopachys opacus Casey
- Stephanopachys pacificus Casey
- Stephanopachys parvulus Casey
- Stephanopachys quadricollis (Fairmaire in Marseul, 1878)
- Stephanopachys rugosus (Olivier, 1795)
- Stephanopachys sachalinensis (Matsumura, 1911)
- Stephanopachys sobrinus (Casey, 1898)
- Stephanopachys substriatus (Paykull, 1800) (powder-post beetle)
- Stephanopachys vetus Peris, Delclòs, Soriano & Perrichot, 2014
