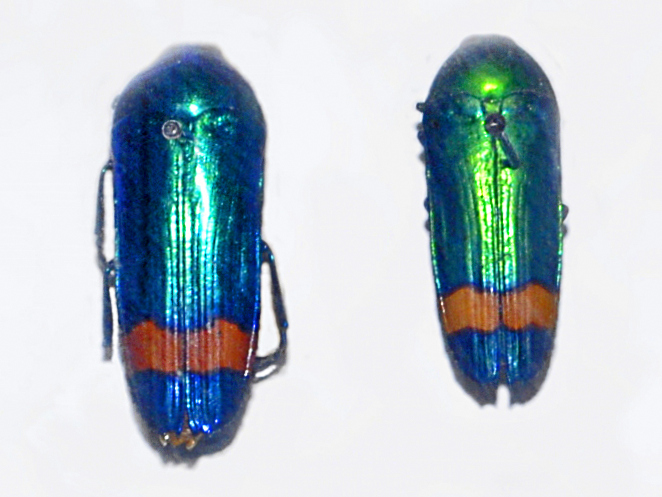
- Conognatha splendens. Mounted specimen.

Scientific classification
- Kingdom: Animalia
- Phylum: Arthropoda
- Class: Insecta
- Order: Coleoptera
- Suborder: Polyphaga
- Infraorder: Elateriformia
- Family: Buprestidae
- Genus: Conognatha
- Species: C. splendens

Binomial name
- Conognatha splendens (Waterhouse, 1912)

= Conognatha splendens =

Species of beetle

Conognatha splendens is a species of beetles in the family Buprestidae.

== Description ==
Conognatha splendens can reach a length of about 25 millimetres (0.98 in). The basic color is metallic blue-green, with a transversal orange band on the elytra.
