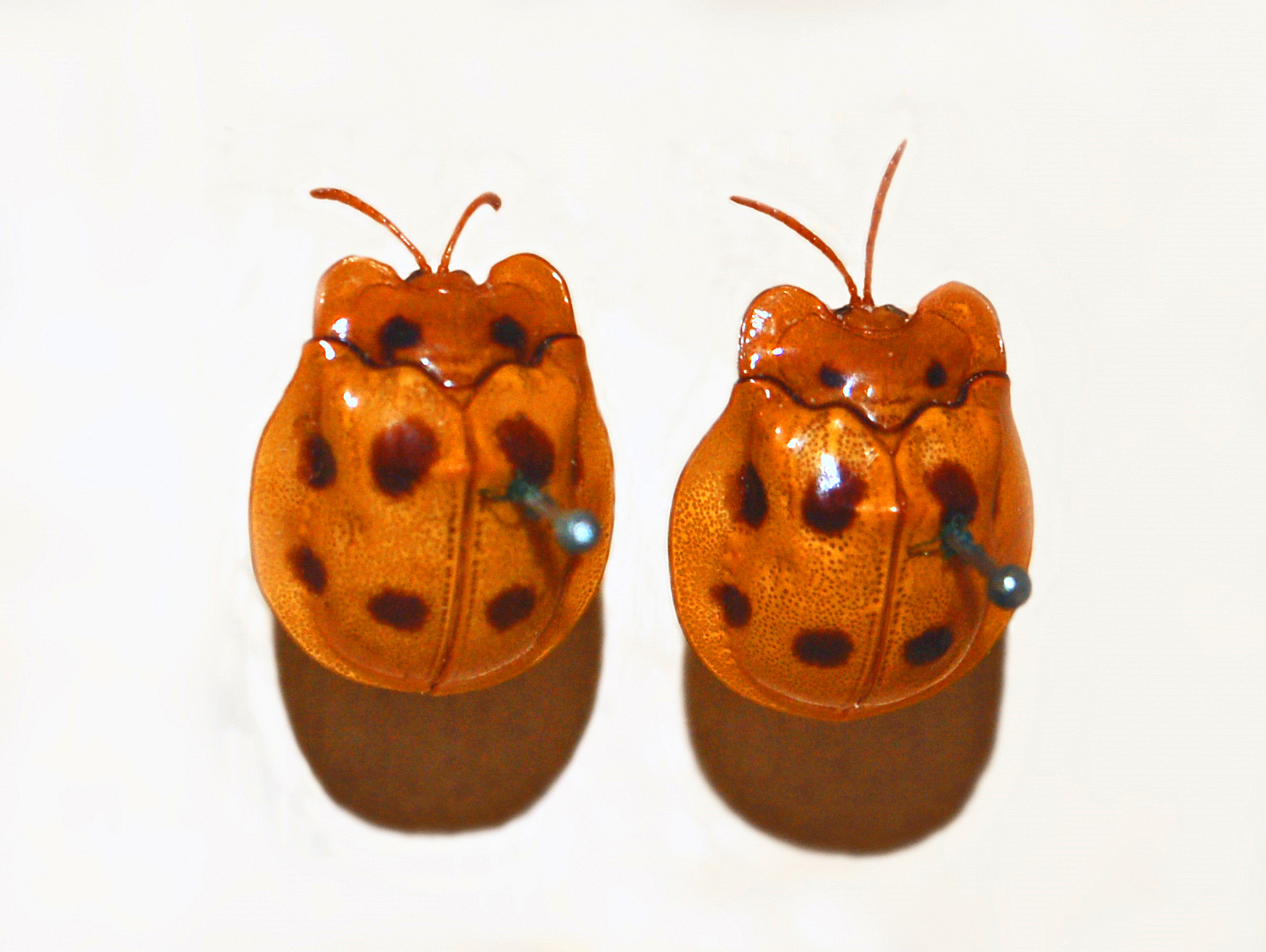
- Basiprionota decempustulata from Sumatra

Scientific classification
- Kingdom: Animalia
- Phylum: Arthropoda
- Clade: Pancrustacea
- Class: Insecta
- Order: Coleoptera
- Suborder: Polyphaga
- Infraorder: Cucujiformia
- Family: Chrysomelidae
- Subfamily: Cassidinae
- Tribe: Basiprionotini; Gressitt, 1952 (1914)

Genera
- see text

= Basiprionotini =

Tribe of leaf beetles

Basiprionotini is a tribe of leaf beetles within the subfamily Cassidinae.

== Genera ==
1. Androya Spaeth, 1911 - Madagascar
2. Basiprionota Chevrolat, 1836 - Asia, South America
3. Cassidopsis Fairmaire, 1899 - Madagascar
4. Craspedonta Chevrolat, 1836 - Asia
5. Epistictina Hincks, 1950 - Asia
6. Megapyga Boheman, 1850 - Philippines
7. Metriopepla Fairmaire, 1882 - monotypic: Africa
8. Pseudandroya Spaeth, 1952 - monotypic
