= Agrilus delicatulus =

Scientific classification
- Kingdom: Animalia
- Phylum: Arthropoda
- Clade: Pancrustacea
- Class: Insecta
- Order: Coleoptera
- Suborder: Polyphaga
- Infraorder: Elateriformia
- Family: Buprestidae
- Genus: Agrilus
- Species: A. delicatulus

Binomial name
- Agrilus delicatulus Waterhouse, 1889

Synonyms
- Agrilus apachei Knull, 1938; Agrilus mixcoati Fisher, 1938

Species of beetle

Agrilus delicatulus is a species of metallic wood-boring beetle in the family Buprestidae. It is found in Central America and North America.
