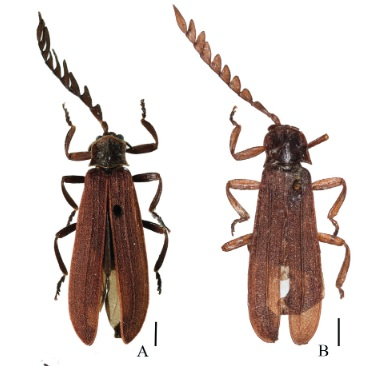

Scientific classification
- Kingdom: Animalia
- Phylum: Arthropoda
- Class: Insecta
- Order: Coleoptera
- Suborder: Polyphaga
- Infraorder: Elateriformia
- Family: Lycidae
- Genus: Macrolycus
- Species: M. nigricollis

Binomial name
- Macrolycus nigricollis Y. Yang, Liu & X. Yang, 2025

= Macrolycus nigricollis =

Species of beetle

Macrolycus nigricollis is a species of beetle of the Lycidae family. This species is found in China (Zhejiang, Fujian).

Adults reach a length of about 7.8–10 mm. The colour of their body is black brown, while the pronotum and scutellum are black and the elytra dark red. The surface is covered with decumbent red pubescence.

== Etymology ==
The species name is derived from Latin niger (meaning black) and collum (meaning neck) and refers to its uniformly black pronotum.
