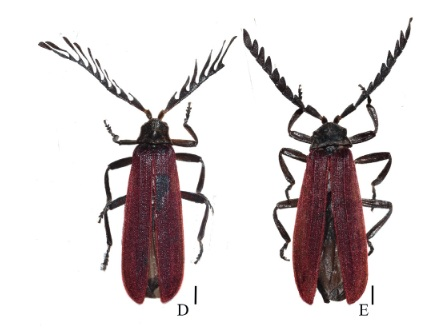

Scientific classification
- Kingdom: Animalia
- Phylum: Arthropoda
- Class: Insecta
- Order: Coleoptera
- Suborder: Polyphaga
- Infraorder: Elateriformia
- Family: Lycidae
- Genus: Macrolycus
- Species: M. graciliramus

Binomial name
- Macrolycus graciliramus Y. Yang, Du & Liu, 2025

= Macrolycus graciliramus =

Species of beetle

Macrolycus graciliramus is a species of beetle of the Lycidae family. This species is found in China (Guangxi).

Adults reach a length of about 10–10.6 mm. The colour of their body is black brown, while the pronotum and scutellum are black and the elytra dark red. The surface is covered with decumbent red pubescence.

== Etymology ==
The species name is derived from Latin gracilis (meaning slender) and ramus (meaning branch) and refers to the slender lamellae on male antennomeres III‒X.
