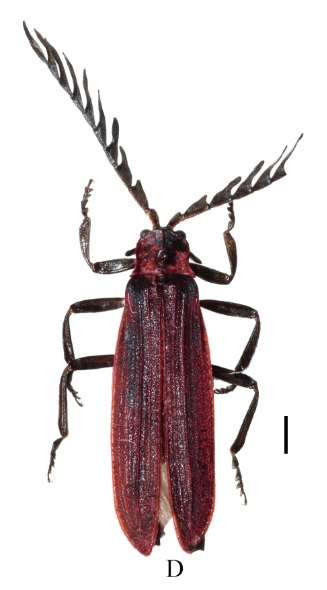

Scientific classification
- Domain: Eukaryota
- Kingdom: Animalia
- Phylum: Arthropoda
- Class: Insecta
- Order: Coleoptera
- Suborder: Polyphaga
- Infraorder: Elateriformia
- Family: Lycidae
- Genus: Macrolycus
- Species: M. mucronatus

Binomial name
- Macrolycus mucronatus Li, Bocak & Pang, 2012

= Macrolycus mucronatus =

Species of beetle

Macrolycus mucronatus is a species of beetle of the Lycidae family. This species is found in China (Guangxi, Hubei, Hunan).
