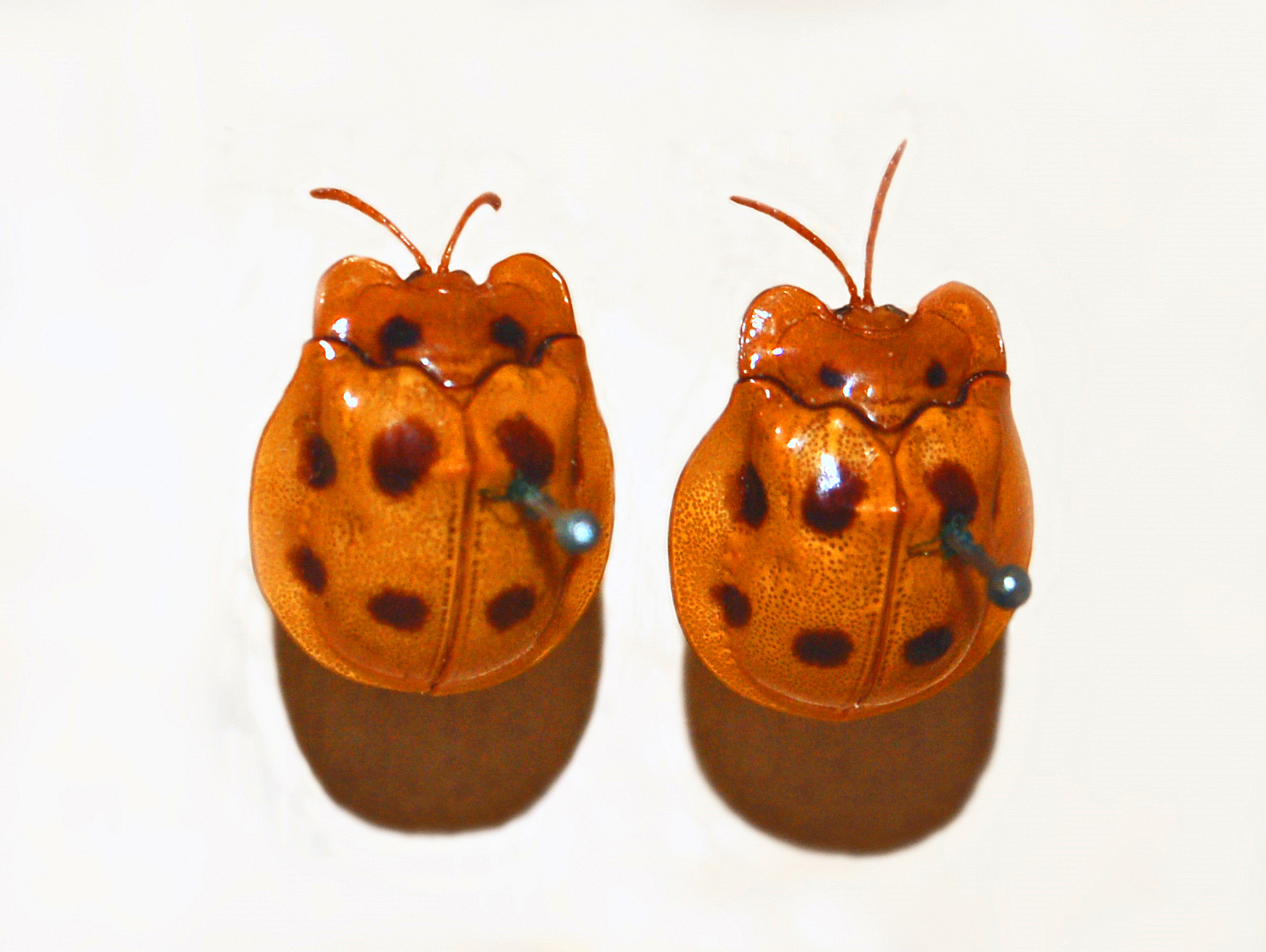
- Basiprionota decempustulata from Sumatra

Scientific classification
- Kingdom: Animalia
- Phylum: Arthropoda
- Clade: Pancrustacea
- Class: Insecta
- Order: Coleoptera
- Suborder: Polyphaga
- Infraorder: Cucujiformia
- Family: Chrysomelidae
- Subfamily: Cassidinae
- Tribe: Basiprionotini
- Genus: Basiprionota; Chevrolat in Dejean, 1836

= Basiprionota =

Genus of beetle

Basiprionota is a genus of beetle belonging to the family Chrysomelidae.

== Species ==
The following species are accepted within Basiprionota:

- Basiprionota amboinica (Spaeth, 1925)
- Basiprionota amitina (Spaeth, 1932)
- Basiprionota andrewesi (Weise, 1897)
- Basiprionota angusta (Spaeth, 1914)
- Basiprionota animosa (Spaeth, 1926)
- Basiprionota atricornis (Spaeth, 1912)
- Basiprionota bakeri (Spaeth, 1925)
- Basiprionota bimaculata (Thunberg, 1789)
- Basiprionota bisignata (Boheman, 1862)
- Basiprionota ceramensis (Spaeth, 1925)
- Basiprionota cerata (Spaeth, 1925)
- Basiprionota chinensis (Fabricius, 1798)
- Basiprionota decemmaculata (Boheman, 1850)
- Basiprionota decempustulata (Boheman, 1850)
- Basiprionota decemstillata (Boheman, 1856)
- Basiprionota encausta (Spaeth, 1925)
- Basiprionota flavicornis Borowiec, 1993
- Basiprionota gibbifera (Spaeth, 1925)
- Basiprionota gibbosa (Baly, 1863)
- Basiprionota gressitti Medvedev, 1957
- Basiprionota immaculata (Wagener, 1881)
- Basiprionota impacata (Spaeth, 1925)
- Basiprionota joloana (Spaeth, 1925)
- Basiprionota laotica (Spaeth, 1933)
- Basiprionota lata Chen and Zia, 1964
- Basiprionota latissima (Wagener, 1881)
- Basiprionota lomholdti Borowiec, 1991
- Basiprionota maerkeli (Boheman, 1850)
- Basiprionota morigera (Spaeth, 1925)
- Basiprionota multiplagiata (Wagener, 1881)
- Basiprionota multipunctata (Gressitt, 1938)
- Basiprionota nigricollis (Weise, 1897)
- Basiprionota octomaculata (Boheman, 1850)
- Basiprionota octonotata (Fabricius, 1787)
- Basiprionota octopunctata (Fabricius, 1787)
- Basiprionota octopustulata (Boheman, 1856)
- Basiprionota omeia Chen and Zia, 1964
- Basiprionota opima (Spaeth, 1925)
- Basiprionota palawanica (Weise, 1913)
- Basiprionota patkoiensis (Spaeth, 1926)
- Basiprionota privigna (Boheman, 1862)
- Basiprionota prognata (Spaeth, 1925)
- Basiprionota pudica (Spaeth, 1925)
- Basiprionota puellaris (Spaeth, 1925)
- Basiprionota quadriimpresa (Boheman, 1850)
- Basiprionota ramigera (Boheman, 1862)
- Basiprionota rugosipennis (Spaeth, 1901)
- Basiprionota sarawacensis (Spaeth, 1912)
- Basiprionota scheerpeltzi (Spaeth, 1925)
- Basiprionota schultzei (Weise, 1908)
- Basiprionota secreta (Spaeth, 1925)
- Basiprionota sexmaculata (Boheman, 1850)
- Basiprionota sinuata (Olivier, 1790)
- Basiprionota sospes (Spaeth, 1925)
- Basiprionota subopaca (Spaeth, 1925)
- Basiprionota sulana (Spaeth, 1925)
- Basiprionota sumatrana (Weise, 1912)
- Basiprionota sumba Borowiec, 2006
- Basiprionota tibetana (Spaeth, 1914)
- Basiprionota timorensis (Spaeth, 1925)
- Basiprionota trux (Spaeth, 1925)
- Basiprionota vicina (Spaeth, 1925)
- Basiprionota westermanni (Mannerheim, 1844)
- Basiprionota whitei (Boheman, 1856)
