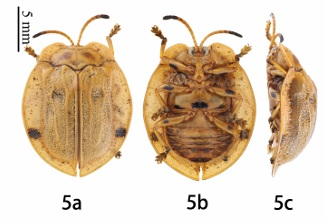

Scientific classification
- Kingdom: Animalia
- Phylum: Arthropoda
- Clade: Pancrustacea
- Class: Insecta
- Order: Coleoptera
- Suborder: Polyphaga
- Infraorder: Cucujiformia
- Family: Chrysomelidae
- Genus: Basiprionota
- Species: B. chinensis

Binomial name
- Basiprionota chinensis (Fabricius, 1798)

Synonyms
- Cassida chinensis Fabricius, 1798; Prioptera satrapa Boheman, 1862; Prioptera bimaculata Gressitt, 1938

= Basiprionota chinensis =

Species of beetle

Basiprionota chinensis is a species of beetle in the family Chrysomelidae. This species is found in China (Fujian, Guangdong, Guangxi, Guizhou, Hainan, Hong Kong, Hubei, Hunan, Jiangsu, Jiangxi, Shaanxi, Shanghai, Sichuan, Zhejiang), the Philippines and Vietnam.

Adults have an oval body. The pronotum has paired dark brown maculae on the disc and the elytra is adorned with a narrow black basal margin, a large midposterior lateral black spot per side, and two longitudinal elevated carinae forming a tumid dorsal profile.
