= Metazycera sexpustulata =

Scientific classification
- Kingdom: Animalia
- Phylum: Arthropoda
- Class: Insecta
- Order: Coleoptera
- Suborder: Polyphaga
- Infraorder: Cucujiformia
- Family: Chrysomelidae
- Genus: Metazycera
- Species: M. sexpustulata

Binomial name
- Metazycera sexpustulata Baly, 1864

Species of beetle

Metazycera sexpustulata is a species of beetle of the family Chrysomelidae. It is found in Brazil (Amazonas).
