= Metazycera =

Scientific classification
- Kingdom: Animalia
- Phylum: Arthropoda
- Clade: Pancrustacea
- Class: Insecta
- Order: Coleoptera
- Suborder: Polyphaga
- Infraorder: Cucujiformia
- Family: Chrysomelidae
- Subfamily: Cassidinae
- Tribe: Chalepini
- Genus: Metazycera; Chevrolat, 1836

Synonyms
- Metaxycera

Genus of leaf beetles

Metazycera is a genus of beetles belonging to the family Chrysomelidae.

== Species ==
- Metazycera amazona Baly, 1864
- Metazycera basithorax Pic, 1931
- Metazycera donckieri Pic, 1932
- Metazycera nigripennis Weise, 1910
- Metazycera particularis Pic, 1932
- Metazycera purpurata Guérin-Méneville, 1844
- Metazycera quadriguttata Waterhouse, 1881
- Metazycera rubroguttata Baly, 1864
- Metazycera sexpustulata Baly, 1864
- Metazycera sinuatevittata Pic, 1932
- Metazycera subapicalis Pic, 1931
- Metazycera trimaculata (Olivier, 1808)
