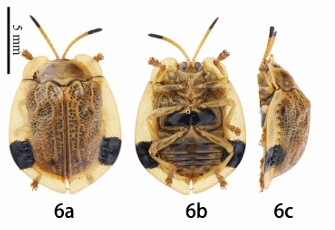

Scientific classification
- Kingdom: Animalia
- Phylum: Arthropoda
- Clade: Pancrustacea
- Class: Insecta
- Order: Coleoptera
- Suborder: Polyphaga
- Infraorder: Cucujiformia
- Family: Chrysomelidae
- Genus: Basiprionota
- Species: B. pudica

Binomial name
- Basiprionota pudica (Spaeth, 1925)

Synonyms
- Prioptera pudica Spaeth, 1925

= Basiprionota pudica =

Species of beetle

Basiprionota pudica is a species of beetle in the family Chrysomelidae. This species is found in China (Guangxi, Guizhou, Hubei, Hunan, Sichuan, Yunnan) and India.

Adults have an elliptical body. The pronotum disc is dark brown, finely and sparsely punctured. The elytra basal margin is black.
