= Metazycera trimaculata =

Scientific classification
- Kingdom: Animalia
- Phylum: Arthropoda
- Class: Insecta
- Order: Coleoptera
- Suborder: Polyphaga
- Infraorder: Cucujiformia
- Family: Chrysomelidae
- Genus: Metazycera
- Species: M. trimaculata

Binomial name
- Metazycera trimaculata (Olivier, 1808)

Synonyms
- Hispa trimaculata Olivier, 1808

Species of beetle

Metazycera trimaculata is a species of beetle of the family Chrysomelidae. It is found in French Guiana.
