= Prosopodonta corallina =

Scientific classification
- Kingdom: Animalia
- Phylum: Arthropoda
- Clade: Pancrustacea
- Class: Insecta
- Order: Coleoptera
- Suborder: Polyphaga
- Infraorder: Cucujiformia
- Family: Chrysomelidae
- Genus: Prosopodonta
- Species: P. corallina

Binomial name
- Prosopodonta corallina Weise, 1910

Species of beetle

Prosopodonta corallina is a species of beetle of the family Chrysomelidae. It is found in Colombia.

== Life history ==
The recorded host plants for this species are palms (Arecaceae).
