= Pleuraphodius matamataensis =

Scientific classification
- Kingdom: Animalia
- Phylum: Arthropoda
- Clade: Pancrustacea
- Class: Insecta
- Order: Coleoptera
- Suborder: Polyphaga
- Infraorder: Scarabaeiformia
- Family: Scarabaeidae
- Genus: Pleuraphodius
- Species: P. matamataensis

Binomial name
- Pleuraphodius matamataensis (Endrödi, 1991)

Synonyms
- Aphodius (Pleuraphodius) matamataensis Endrödi, 1991

Species of beetle

Pleuraphodius matamataensis is a species of beetle of the family Scarabaeidae. It is found in South Africa (Northern Cape).

== Description ==
Adults reach a length of about 2.6 mm (0.10 in). They have a pale yellow body, with the vertex and the disc of the pronotum somewhat darkened.
