= Pseudandroya =

Scientific classification
- Kingdom: Animalia
- Phylum: Arthropoda
- Clade: Pancrustacea
- Class: Insecta
- Order: Coleoptera
- Suborder: Polyphaga
- Infraorder: Cucujiformia
- Family: Chrysomelidae
- Subfamily: Cassidinae
- Tribe: Basiprionotini
- Genus: Pseudandroya; Spaeth, 1952
- Species: P. livingstonei

Binomial name
- Pseudandroya livingstonei (Baly, 1864)

Synonyms
- Calopepla livingstonii Baly, 1864

Genus of beetles

Pseudandroya is a genus of leaf beetles in the family Chrysomelidae. It is monotypic, being represented by the single species, Pseudandroya livingstonei, which is found in Tanzania and Zambia.
