= Prosopodonta suturalis =

Scientific classification
- Kingdom: Animalia
- Phylum: Arthropoda
- Class: Insecta
- Order: Coleoptera
- Suborder: Polyphaga
- Infraorder: Cucujiformia
- Family: Chrysomelidae
- Genus: Prosopodonta
- Species: P. suturalis

Binomial name
- Prosopodonta suturalis (Baly, 1858)

Synonyms
- Cheirispa suturalis Baly, 1858

Species of beetle

Prosopodonta suturalis is a species of beetle of the family Chrysomelidae. It is found in Venezuela.

== Life history ==
No host plant has been documented for this species.
