= Conognatha rhombofasciata =

- Conognatha rhombofasciata showing colour variants

Scientific classification
- Kingdom: Animalia
- Phylum: Arthropoda
- Clade: Pancrustacea
- Class: Insecta
- Order: Coleoptera
- Suborder: Polyphaga
- Infraorder: Elateriformia
- Family: Buprestidae
- Genus: Conognatha
- Species: C. rhombofasciata

Binomial name
- Conognatha rhombofasciata Pineda, Taboada‑Verona & Alzate‑Cano, 2026

Species of beetle

Conognatha rhombofasciata is a species of beetle of the family Buprestidae. It is found in Colombia (Antioquia).

== Description ==
Adults reach a length of about 18–21 mm (0.71–0.83 in). The head is densely punctate with coarse punctures separated by spaces equal to or less than the width of one puncture. The pubescence is inconspicuous. The pronotum is punctate with coarse punctures separated by spaces 2-3 times the width of one puncture. The pubescence consists of scattered tufts of long setae that sparsely cover the surface. The pronotal base narrower than the elytral base and the posterior angles are not prominent and strongly rounded. The scutellum is bluish black, smooth, glabrous and reniform. The elytra are orange with bluish-black ornamentation (a longitudinal humeral stripe on the anterior third that widens posteriorly and reaches the lateral margin and a transverse median band rhombus-shaped). The ventral surface is bluish black with conspicuous pubescence, especially toward the sides.

== Etymology ==
The species name is derived from the Latin rhombus (meaning a rhombus or diamond) and fasciatus (meaning banded or striped).
