= Pleuraphodius berlandi =

Scientific classification
- Kingdom: Animalia
- Phylum: Arthropoda
- Clade: Pancrustacea
- Class: Insecta
- Order: Coleoptera
- Suborder: Polyphaga
- Infraorder: Scarabaeiformia
- Family: Scarabaeidae
- Genus: Pleuraphodius
- Species: P. berlandi

Binomial name
- Pleuraphodius berlandi Paulian, 1945

Species of beetle

Pleuraphodius berlandi is a species of beetle of the family Scarabaeidae. It is found in Indonesia (Java) and Vietnam.

== Description ==
Adults reach a length of about 2.75–3 mm (0.108–0.118 in). They have an elongate-oval, blackish-brown body, with the anterior part of the body is slightly glossy, while the elytra are mostly dull. They are mostly glabrous, with only a row of short, pale hairs at the base of the pronotum.
