= Pleuraphodius malangensis =

Scientific classification
- Kingdom: Animalia
- Phylum: Arthropoda
- Clade: Pancrustacea
- Class: Insecta
- Order: Coleoptera
- Suborder: Polyphaga
- Infraorder: Scarabaeiformia
- Family: Scarabaeidae
- Genus: Pleuraphodius
- Species: P. malangensis

Binomial name
- Pleuraphodius malangensis (Balthasar, 1960)

Synonyms
- Aphodius (Pleuraphodius) malangensis Balthasar, 1960

Species of beetle

Pleuraphodius malangensis is a species of beetle of the family Scarabaeidae. It is found in Indonesia (Java).

== Description ==
Adults reach a length of about 3 mm (0.12 in). They have an elongate-oval, moderately convex, glabrous, shiny, blackish-brown body, with the anterior margin of the head, the sides of the pronotum, and part of the anterior margin of the pronotum yellowish-red. The underside and legs are yellowish-red.
