= Pleuraphodius mutilus =

Scientific classification
- Kingdom: Animalia
- Phylum: Arthropoda
- Clade: Pancrustacea
- Class: Insecta
- Order: Coleoptera
- Suborder: Polyphaga
- Infraorder: Scarabaeiformia
- Family: Scarabaeidae
- Genus: Pleuraphodius
- Species: P. mutilus

Binomial name
- Pleuraphodius mutilus (Schmidt, 1910)

Synonyms
- Aphodius mutilus Schmidt, 1910

Species of beetle

Pleuraphodius mutilus is a species of beetle of the family Scarabaeidae. It is found in the Democratic Republic of the Congo and South Africa (KwaZulu-Natal).

== Description ==
Adults reach a length of about 3–4.5 mm (0.12–0.18 in). They have an oval-elongate, convex, shiny, glabrous, brown-blackish or brown reddish body.
