= Pleuraphodius anceps =

Scientific classification
- Kingdom: Animalia
- Phylum: Arthropoda
- Clade: Pancrustacea
- Class: Insecta
- Order: Coleoptera
- Suborder: Polyphaga
- Infraorder: Scarabaeiformia
- Family: Scarabaeidae
- Genus: Pleuraphodius
- Species: P. anceps

Binomial name
- Pleuraphodius anceps (Schmidt, 1910)

Synonyms
- Aphodius anceps Schmidt, 1910

Species of beetle

Pleuraphodius anceps is a species of beetle of the family Scarabaeidae. It is found in Guinea-Bissau and Senegal.

== Description ==
Adults reach a length of about 3.5 mm (0.14 in). They have an elongated, slightly convex, reddish-brown body.
