= Cassidopsis =

Scientific classification
- Kingdom: Animalia
- Phylum: Arthropoda
- Clade: Pancrustacea
- Class: Insecta
- Order: Coleoptera
- Suborder: Polyphaga
- Infraorder: Cucujiformia
- Family: Chrysomelidae
- Subfamily: Cassidinae
- Tribe: Basiprionotini
- Genus: Cassidopsis; Fairmaire, 1899

Genus of leaf beetles

Cassidopsis is a genus of leaf beetles of the family Chrysomelidae.

== Species ==
- Cassidopsis basipennis Fairmaire, 1899
- Cassidopsis borowieci Sekerka, 2007
- Cassidopsis perrieri Fairmaire, 1900
