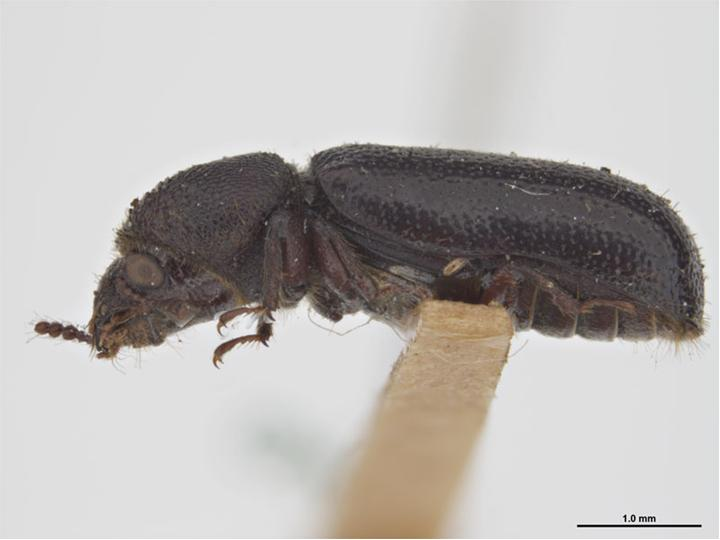

Scientific classification
- Domain: Eukaryota
- Kingdom: Animalia
- Phylum: Arthropoda
- Class: Insecta
- Order: Coleoptera
- Suborder: Polyphaga
- Family: Bostrichidae
- Genus: Stephanopachys
- Species: S. cribratus

Binomial name
- Stephanopachys cribratus (LeConte, 1866)

= Stephanopachys cribratus =

Species of beetle

Stephanopachys cribratus is a species of horned powder-post beetle in the family Bostrichidae. It is found in North America, particularly east of the Rocky Mountains. It is dark brown and typically between 3.5 and 5.0 mm long.
