= Conognatha rochereaui =

Scientific classification
- Kingdom: Animalia
- Phylum: Arthropoda
- Clade: Pancrustacea
- Class: Insecta
- Order: Coleoptera
- Suborder: Polyphaga
- Infraorder: Elateriformia
- Family: Buprestidae
- Genus: Conognatha
- Species: C. rochereaui

Binomial name
- Conognatha rochereaui Théry, 1932

Species of beetle

Conognatha rochereaui is a species of beetle of the family Buprestidae. It is found in Colombia (Santander, Antioquia).
