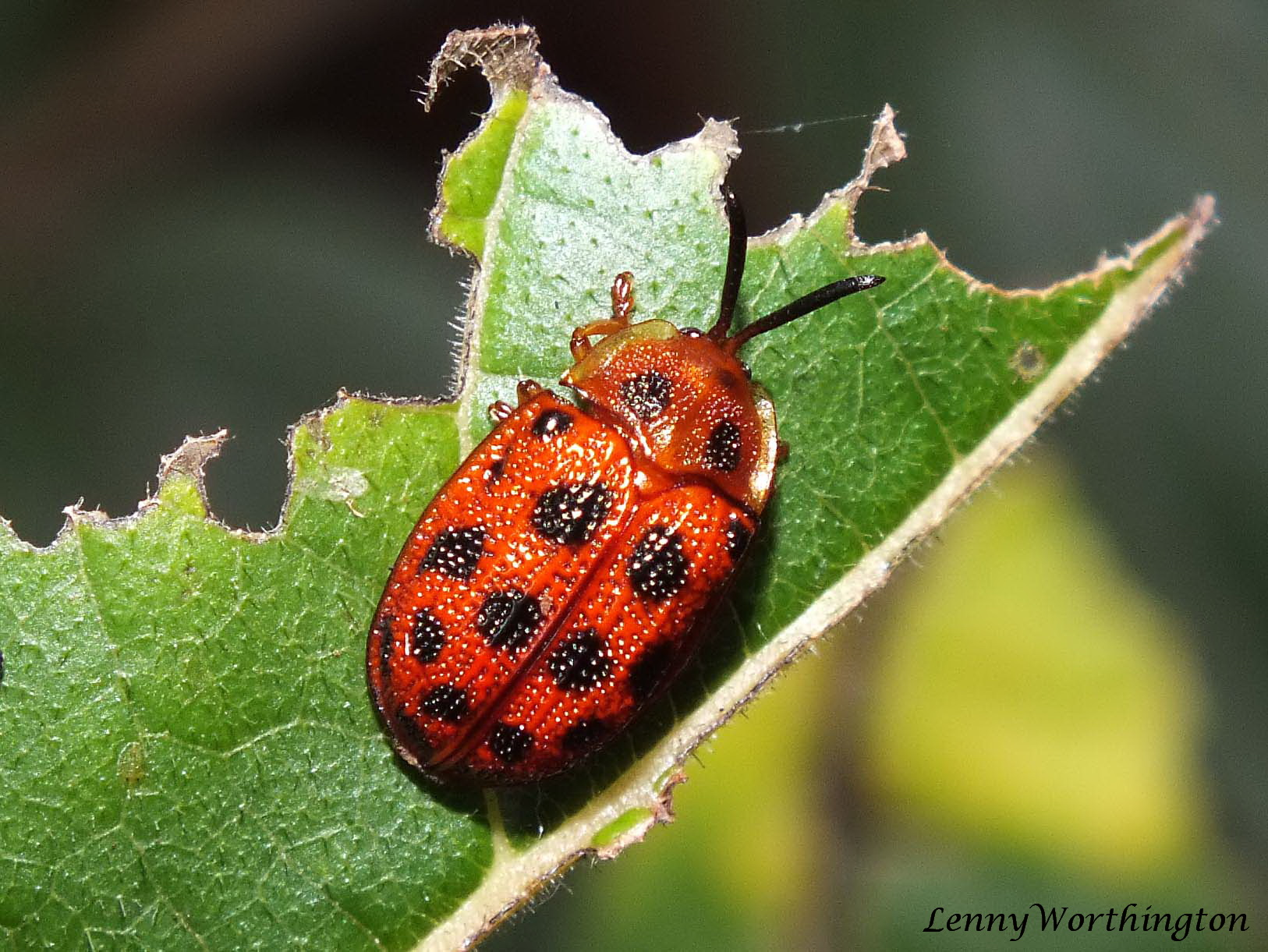
- Epistictina viridimaculata

Scientific classification
- Kingdom: Animalia
- Phylum: Arthropoda
- Clade: Pancrustacea
- Class: Insecta
- Order: Coleoptera
- Suborder: Polyphaga
- Infraorder: Cucujiformia
- Family: Chrysomelidae
- Tribe: Basiprionotini
- Genus: Epistictina; Hincks, 1950

Type species
- Epistictia viridimaculata Boheman, 1850

= Epistictina =

Genus of tortoise beetles

Epistictina is a genus of tortoise beetle found in Asia. There are about 5 species in the genus.

- Epistictina fulvonigra Maulik, 1913 - Burma
- Epistictina perplexa Baly, 1863 - Thailand, Vietnam
- Epistictina reicheana (Guérin, 1844) - Sri Lanka, India, Nepal
- Epistictina viridimaculata (Boheman, 1850) - India to Vietnam
- Epistictina weisei (Spaeth, 1914) - western India
