= Megapyga =

Scientific classification
- Kingdom: Animalia
- Phylum: Arthropoda
- Clade: Pancrustacea
- Class: Insecta
- Order: Coleoptera
- Suborder: Polyphaga
- Infraorder: Cucujiformia
- Family: Chrysomelidae
- Subfamily: Cassidinae
- Tribe: Basiprionotini
- Genus: Megapyga; Boheman, 1850

Genus of leaf beetles

Megapyga is a genus of leaf beetles of the family Chrysomelidae.

== Species ==
- Megapyga angulicollis Spaeth, 1898
- Megapyga brevis Spaeth, 1904
- Megapyga chinensis Spaeth, 1936
- Megapyga coeruleomaculata Boheman, 1850
- Megapyga eximia Boheman, 1850
- Megapyga maai Kimoto, 1996
- Megapyga minima Borowiec, 1998
- Megapyga obscuricollis Borowiec, 1993
- Megapyga terminalis Boheman, 1862
