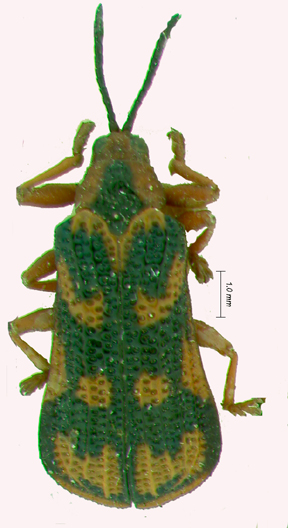

Scientific classification
- Kingdom: Animalia
- Phylum: Arthropoda
- Class: Insecta
- Order: Coleoptera
- Suborder: Polyphaga
- Infraorder: Cucujiformia
- Family: Chrysomelidae
- Genus: Metazycera
- Species: M. subapicalis

Binomial name
- Metazycera subapicalis Pic, 1931

= Metazycera subapicalis =

Species of beetle

Metazycera subapicalis is a species of beetle of the family Chrysomelidae. It is found in Brazil (Matto Grosso, Rio de Janeiro) and Paraguay.

== Biology ==
They have been recorded feeding on Cecropia adenopus.
