= Pleuraphodius montuosus =

Scientific classification
- Kingdom: Animalia
- Phylum: Arthropoda
- Clade: Pancrustacea
- Class: Insecta
- Order: Coleoptera
- Suborder: Polyphaga
- Infraorder: Scarabaeiformia
- Family: Scarabaeidae
- Genus: Pleuraphodius
- Species: P. montuosus

Binomial name
- Pleuraphodius montuosus (Schmidt, 1910)

Synonyms
- Aphodius montuosus Schmidt, 1910

Species of beetle

Pleuraphodius montuosus is a species of beetle of the family Scarabaeidae. It is found in the Democratic Republic of the Congo.

== Description ==
Adults reach a length of about 4.5 mm (0.18 in). They have a slightly convex, blackish-brown body, with the clypeus, the sides of the pronotum and elytra and the scutellum lighter. The entire surface is covered in very short, barely visible setae.
