= Prosopodonta =

Scientific classification
- Kingdom: Animalia
- Phylum: Arthropoda
- Class: Insecta
- Order: Coleoptera
- Suborder: Polyphaga
- Infraorder: Cucujiformia
- Family: Chrysomelidae
- Subfamily: Cassidinae
- Tribe: Prosopodontini; Weise, 1910
- Genus: Prosopodonta; Baly, 1858

Synonyms
- Cheirispa Baly, 1858

Genus of leaf beetles

Prosopodonta is a genus of beetles of the family Chrysomelidae. It is the only genus of the tribe Prosopodontini.

== Species ==
- Prosopodonta atrimembris Pic, 1934
- Prosopodonta balyi Weise, 1905
- Prosopodonta bicoloripes Pic, 1934
- Prosopodonta bidentata (Baly, 1858)
- Prosopodonta corallina Weise, 1910
- Prosopodonta cordillera Maulik, 1931
- Prosopodonta costata Waterhouse, 1879
- Prosopodonta deplanata Uhmann, 1927
- Prosopodonta dichroa (Perty, 1832)
- Prosopodonta distincta (Baly, 1885)
- Prosopodonta dorsata (Baly, 1885)
- Prosopodonta fassli Weise, 1910
- Prosopodonta interrupta Weise, 1910
- Prosopodonta irregularis Weise, 1910
- Prosopodonta limbata Baly, 1858
- Prosopodonta montana Uhmann, 1939
- Prosopodonta proxima Baly, 1858
- Prosopodonta punctata Waterhouse, 1879
- Prosopodonta quinquelineata Weise, 1910
- Prosopodonta rufipennis Baly, 1858
- Prosopodonta scutellaris Waterhouse, 1881
- Prosopodonta soror Weise, 1910
- Prosopodonta sulcipennis Weise, 1910
- Prosopodonta sulphuricollis Weise, 1910
- Prosopodonta suturalis (Baly, 1858)
- Prosopodonta tristis Uhmann, 1939
