= Pleuraphodius kaokoveldensis =

Scientific classification
- Kingdom: Animalia
- Phylum: Arthropoda
- Clade: Pancrustacea
- Class: Insecta
- Order: Coleoptera
- Suborder: Polyphaga
- Infraorder: Scarabaeiformia
- Family: Scarabaeidae
- Genus: Pleuraphodius
- Species: P. kaokoveldensis

Binomial name
- Pleuraphodius kaokoveldensis (Endrödi, 1991)

Synonyms
- Aphodius (Pleuraphodius) kaokoveldensis Endrödi, 1991

Species of beetle

Pleuraphodius kaokoveldensis is a species of beetle of the family Scarabaeidae. It is found in Namibia and South Africa.

== Description ==
Adults reach a length of about 3.5–3.8 mm (0.14–0.15 in). They have a glabrous, dark brown to black body, with the sides of the pronotum and elytra paler. The head and pronotum are shiny, while the elytra are duller. The legs are reddish-brown.
