= Metazycera donckieri =

Scientific classification
- Kingdom: Animalia
- Phylum: Arthropoda
- Class: Insecta
- Order: Coleoptera
- Suborder: Polyphaga
- Infraorder: Cucujiformia
- Family: Chrysomelidae
- Genus: Metazycera
- Species: M. donckieri

Binomial name
- Metazycera donckieri Pic, 1932

Species of beetle

Metazycera donckieri is a species of beetle of the family Chrysomelidae. It is found in French Guiana.
