= Pleuraphodius tectoformibus =

Scientific classification
- Kingdom: Animalia
- Phylum: Arthropoda
- Clade: Pancrustacea
- Class: Insecta
- Order: Coleoptera
- Suborder: Polyphaga
- Infraorder: Scarabaeiformia
- Family: Scarabaeidae
- Genus: Pleuraphodius
- Species: P. tectoformibus

Binomial name
- Pleuraphodius tectoformibus (Schmidt, 1909)

Synonyms
- Aphodius tectoformibus Schmidt, 1909

Species of beetle

Pleuraphodius tectoformibus is a species of beetle of the family Scarabaeidae. It is found in the Philippines.

== Description ==
Adults reach a length of about 2.5–3.5 mm (0.098–0.138 in). They have a light brown, slightly glossy, slender, moderately convex body.
