= Prosopodonta atrimembris =

Scientific classification
- Kingdom: Animalia
- Phylum: Arthropoda
- Class: Insecta
- Order: Coleoptera
- Suborder: Polyphaga
- Infraorder: Cucujiformia
- Family: Chrysomelidae
- Genus: Prosopodonta
- Species: P. atrimembris

Binomial name
- Prosopodonta atrimembris Pic, 1934

Species of beetle

Prosopodonta atrimembris is a species of beetle of the family Chrysomelidae. It is found in Venezuela.

== Life history ==
No host plant has been documented for this species.
