= Pleuraphodius confinis =

Scientific classification
- Kingdom: Animalia
- Phylum: Arthropoda
- Clade: Pancrustacea
- Class: Insecta
- Order: Coleoptera
- Suborder: Polyphaga
- Infraorder: Scarabaeiformia
- Family: Scarabaeidae
- Genus: Pleuraphodius
- Species: P. confinis

Binomial name
- Pleuraphodius confinis (Schmidt, 1910)

Synonyms
- Aphodius confinis Schmidt, 1910

Species of beetle

Pleuraphodius confinis is a species of beetle of the family Scarabaeidae. It is found in Botswana, Namibia, the Democratic Republic of the Congo, South Africa, Rwanda, Somalia and Tanzania.

== Description ==
Adults reach a length of about 4.5 mm (0.18 in). They have an elongate, flat, reddish-brown body.
