= Metazycera purpurata =

Scientific classification
- Kingdom: Animalia
- Phylum: Arthropoda
- Clade: Pancrustacea
- Class: Insecta
- Order: Coleoptera
- Suborder: Polyphaga
- Infraorder: Cucujiformia
- Family: Chrysomelidae
- Genus: Metazycera
- Species: M. purpurata

Binomial name
- Metazycera purpurata Guérin-Méneville, 1844

Species of beetle

Metazycera purpurata is a species of beetle of the family Chrysomelidae. It is found in Brazil, Colombia, French Guiana, Paraguay, Suriname and Uruguay.

== Biology ==
They have been recorded feeding on Cecropia species.
