= Acrossoides =

Scientific classification
- Kingdom: Animalia
- Phylum: Arthropoda
- Clade: Pancrustacea
- Class: Insecta
- Order: Coleoptera
- Suborder: Polyphaga
- Infraorder: Scarabaeiformia
- Family: Scarabaeidae
- Subfamily: Aphodiinae
- Tribe: Aphodiini
- Genus: Acrossoides; Schmidt, 1914

Genus of beetles

Acrossoides is a genus of beetles of the family Scarabaeidae.

== Species ==
- Acrossoides brittoni (Stebnicka & Howden, 1995)
- Acrossoides yorkensis (Blackburn, 1892)
