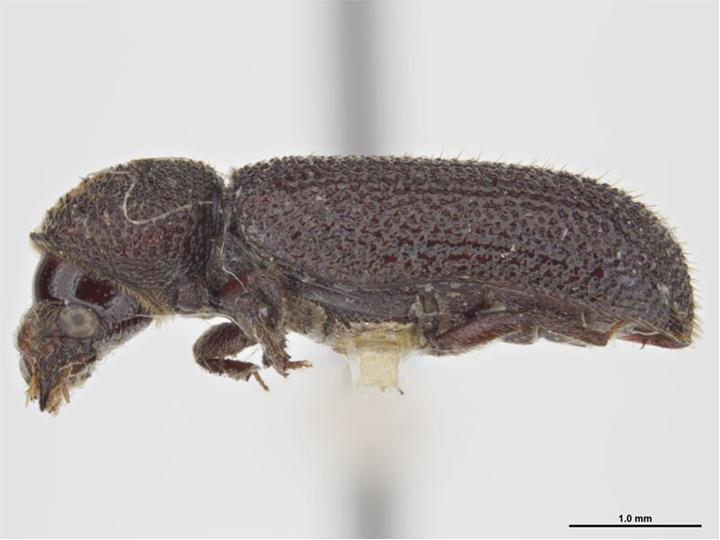

Scientific classification
- Kingdom: Animalia
- Phylum: Arthropoda
- Clade: Pancrustacea
- Class: Insecta
- Order: Coleoptera
- Suborder: Polyphaga
- Family: Bostrichidae
- Genus: Stephanopachys
- Species: S. substriatus

Binomial name
- Stephanopachys substriatus (Paykull, 1800)

= Stephanopachys substriatus =

Species of beetle

Stephanopachys substriatus, the powder-post beetle, is a species of horned powder-post beetle in the family Bostrichidae. It is found in Europe and Northern Asia (excluding China) and North America.
