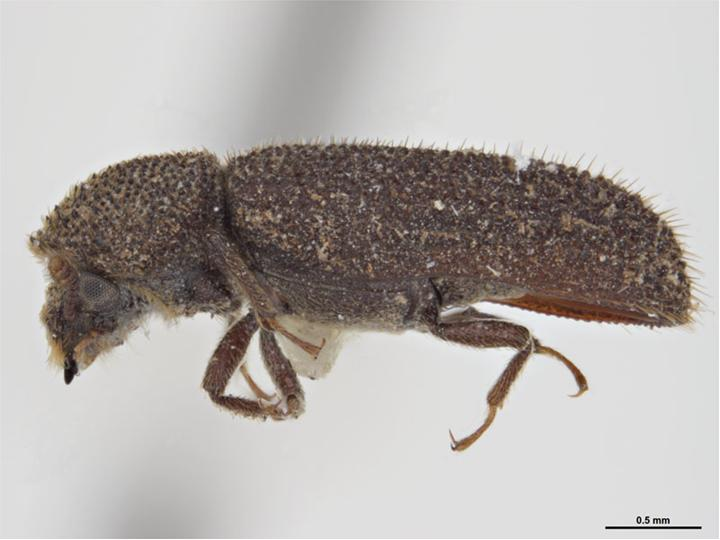

Scientific classification
- Kingdom: Animalia
- Phylum: Arthropoda
- Clade: Pancrustacea
- Class: Insecta
- Order: Coleoptera
- Suborder: Polyphaga
- Family: Bostrichidae
- Genus: Stephanopachys
- Species: S. rugosus

Binomial name
- Stephanopachys rugosus (Olivier, 1795)

= Stephanopachys rugosus =

Species of beetle

Stephanopachys rugosus is a species of horned powder-post beetle in the family Bostrichidae. It is found in Africa, Australia, and North America.
