= Conognatha callioma =

Scientific classification
- Kingdom: Animalia
- Phylum: Arthropoda
- Clade: Pancrustacea
- Class: Insecta
- Order: Coleoptera
- Suborder: Polyphaga
- Infraorder: Elateriformia
- Family: Buprestidae
- Genus: Conognatha
- Species: C. callioma

Binomial name
- Conognatha callioma Théry, 1932

Species of beetle

Conognatha callioma is a species of beetle of the family Buprestidae. It is found in Colombia.
