= Pleuraphodius javanus =

Scientific classification
- Kingdom: Animalia
- Phylum: Arthropoda
- Clade: Pancrustacea
- Class: Insecta
- Order: Coleoptera
- Suborder: Polyphaga
- Infraorder: Scarabaeiformia
- Family: Scarabaeidae
- Genus: Pleuraphodius
- Species: P. javanus

Binomial name
- Pleuraphodius javanus (Balthasar, 1945)

Synonyms
- Heptaulacus javanus Balthasar, 1945

Species of beetle

Pleuraphodius javanus is a species of beetle of the family Scarabaeidae. It is found in Indonesia (Java).

== Description ==
Adults reach a length of about 2.8–3 mm (0.11–0.12 in). They have an elongate, moderately convex, somewhat glossy, light yellowish-brown body, with the head, the disc of the pronotum, and the disc of the elytra usually darker. The underside is light brown and the legs are light reddish-brown.
