= Pleuraphodius viscaensis =

Scientific classification
- Kingdom: Animalia
- Phylum: Arthropoda
- Clade: Pancrustacea
- Class: Insecta
- Order: Coleoptera
- Suborder: Polyphaga
- Infraorder: Scarabaeiformia
- Family: Scarabaeidae
- Genus: Pleuraphodius
- Species: P. viscaensis

Binomial name
- Pleuraphodius viscaensis (Stebnicka, 1993)

Synonyms
- Aphodius (Pleuraphodius) viscaensis Stebnicka, 1993

Species of beetle

Pleuraphodius viscaensis is a species of beetle of the family Scarabaeidae. It is found in the Philippines (Leyte).

== Description ==
Adults reach a length of about 2.5–2.8 mm (0.098–0.110 in). They have an oval, moderately shining, orange-brown body, with the head (between the eyes) and elytral suture slightly darker. The surface is covered with tiny setae.
