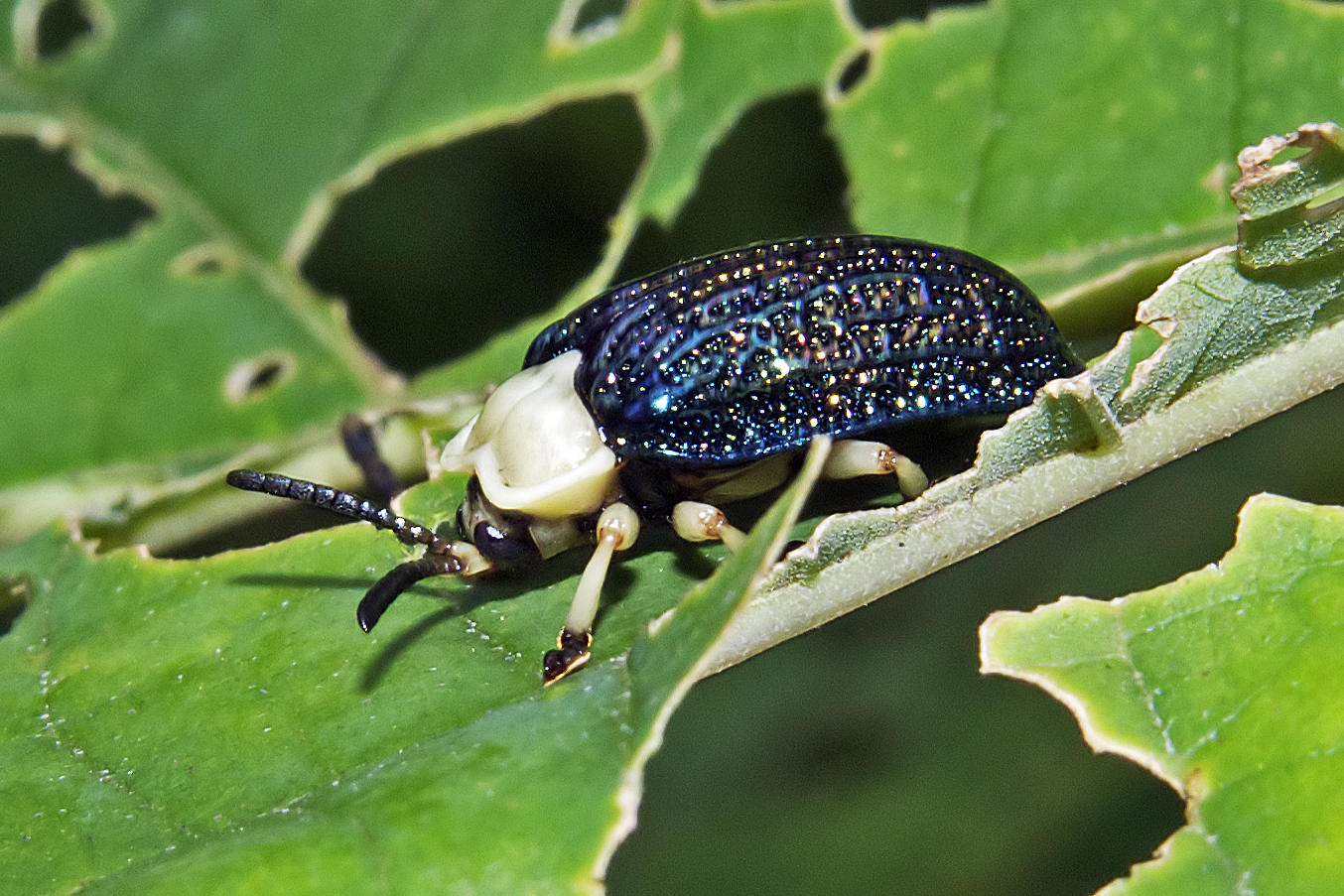
- Craspedonta leayana

Scientific classification
- Kingdom: Animalia
- Phylum: Arthropoda
- Clade: Pancrustacea
- Class: Insecta
- Order: Coleoptera
- Suborder: Polyphaga
- Infraorder: Cucujiformia
- Family: Chrysomelidae
- Subfamily: Cassidinae
- Tribe: Basiprionotini
- Genus: Craspedonta; Chevrolat, 1836

Synonyms
- Callipepla Agassiz, 1846; Calopepla Hope, 1840

= Craspedonta =

Genus of beetles

Craspedonta is a genus of Asian leaf beetles in the tribe Basiprionotini; it was erected by Louis Chevrolat in 1836. Species have been recorded from India, Indochina and Hainan island.

== Species ==
The Global Biodiversity Information Facility lists:

- Craspedonta andrewesi (Weise, 1897)
- Craspedonta laotica Swietojanska & Borowiec, 2000
- Craspedonta leayana (Latreille, 1807) – type species (as Imatidium leayanum Latreille, 1807)
- Craspedonta levis Borowiec, 1993
- Craspedonta mouhoti (Baly, 1863)
- Craspedonta obscura (Weise, 1897)
