= Pleuraphodius =

Scientific classification
- Kingdom: Animalia
- Phylum: Arthropoda
- Clade: Pancrustacea
- Class: Insecta
- Order: Coleoptera
- Suborder: Polyphaga
- Infraorder: Scarabaeiformia
- Family: Scarabaeidae
- Subfamily: Aphodiinae
- Tribe: Aphodiini
- Genus: Pleuraphodius; Schmidt, 1914

Genus of beetles

Pleuraphodius is a genus of beetles of the family Scarabaeidae.

== Species ==
- Pleuraphodius abax (Endrödi, 1960)
- Pleuraphodius aequatorialis (Petrovitz, 1966)
- Pleuraphodius agnoscibilis (Bordat, 1997)
- Pleuraphodius anceps (Schmidt, 1910)
- Pleuraphodius arabiaefelicis Král, Rakovič & Mencl, 2016
- Pleuraphodius assimilis (Petrovitz, 1962)
- Pleuraphodius berlandi Paulian, 1945
- Pleuraphodius bibatillatus (Petrovitz, 1958)
- Pleuraphodius bovis (Endrödi, 1960)
- Pleuraphodius brunneus (Thunberg, 1818)
- Pleuraphodius burgeoni (Paulian, 1939)
- Pleuraphodius burorum (Endrödi, 1980)
- Pleuraphodius buschirii (Petrovitz, 1964)
- Pleuraphodius capillatus Bordat, 2016
- Pleuraphodius carinatipennis (Bordat, 1994)
- Pleuraphodius chaboti Paulian, 1942
- Pleuraphodius clementi (Bordat, 1986)
- Pleuraphodius confinis (Schmidt, 1910)
- Pleuraphodius conformis (Petrovitz, 1967)
- Pleuraphodius darfurensis (Balthasar, 1963)
- Pleuraphodius decellei (Balthasar, 1966)
- Pleuraphodius dingaani (Petrovitz, 1964)
- Pleuraphodius dispar Bordat, 2005
- Pleuraphodius ducorpsi Paulian, 1942
- Pleuraphodius ebeninus (Endrödi, 1960)
- Pleuraphodius elgonensis (Balthasar, 1967)
- Pleuraphodius fosseyae Bordat, Cambefort & Bruneau de, 1991
- Pleuraphodius funestus (Endrödi, 1955)
- Pleuraphodius gnomus (Koshantschikov, 1916)
- Pleuraphodius hamoriae (Endrödi, 1973)
- Pleuraphodius hanstroemi (Landin, 1956)
- Pleuraphodius humator (Endrödi, 1964)
- Pleuraphodius hybridus (Endrödi, 1964)
- Pleuraphodius ilamensis (Stebnicka, 1990)
- Pleuraphodius impudicus (Fabricius, 1801)
- Pleuraphodius javanus (Balthasar, 1945)
- Pleuraphodius jombaensis Bordat, Cambefort & Bruneau de, 1991
- Pleuraphodius kaffa (Petrovitz, 1964)
- Pleuraphodius kaokoveldensis (Endrödi, 1991)
- Pleuraphodius kavani (Balthasar, 1935)
- Pleuraphodius kilimandjaroensis (Petrovitz, 1965)
- Pleuraphodius landini (Endrödi, 1956)
- Pleuraphodius laterociliatus (Petrovitz, 1958)
- Pleuraphodius latistriatus (Bordat, 1990)
- Pleuraphodius leo Paulian, 1942
- Pleuraphodius letabus (Landin, 1956)
- Pleuraphodius lewisi (Waterhouse, 1875)
- Pleuraphodius lineatosulcatus (Harold, 1859)
- Pleuraphodius luzonensis (Petrovitz, 1972)
- Pleuraphodius malangensis (Balthasar, 1960)
- Pleuraphodius malawiensis (Bordat, 1997)
- Pleuraphodius matamataensis (Endrödi, 1991)
- Pleuraphodius maynei (Paulian, 1939)
- Pleuraphodius medanii (Endrödi, 1979)
- Pleuraphodius medioximus (Péringuey, 1901)
- Pleuraphodius mime Paulian, 1942
- Pleuraphodius montuosus (Schmidt, 1910)
- Pleuraphodius multicarinatus Endrödi, 1964
- Pleuraphodius mutilus (Schmidt, 1910)
- Pleuraphodius mwingi Bordat, 2005
- Pleuraphodius natalensis (Petrovitz, 1964)
- Pleuraphodius olkokolae (Endrödi, 1971)
- Pleuraphodius parakavani Bordat, 2023
- Pleuraphodius paranceps (Endrödi, 1979)
- Pleuraphodius probabilis Bordat, 2023
- Pleuraphodius pumilus (Quedenfeldt, 1884)
- Pleuraphodius purkynei (Balthasar, 1933)
- Pleuraphodius pusio (Kolbe, 1908)
- Pleuraphodius pygmaeus (Boheman, 1857)
- Pleuraphodius ratnapurensis Stebnicka, 1988
- Pleuraphodius reticulatus (Endrödi, 1980)
- Pleuraphodius reverendus Bordat, 2014
- Pleuraphodius rothschildi (Schmidt, 1911)
- Pleuraphodius rudis (Endrödi, 1971)
- Pleuraphodius simillimus (Petrovitz, 1964)
- Pleuraphodius socius (Endrödi, 1964)
- Pleuraphodius soudanensis (Petrovitz, 1958)
- Pleuraphodius sparsepunctatus (Endrödi, 1964)
- Pleuraphodius stehliki (Endrödi, 1977)
- Pleuraphodius stipulus (Petrovitz, 1962)
- Pleuraphodius subteter (Petrovitz, 1962)
- Pleuraphodius sulcipennis (Boheman, 1857)
- Pleuraphodius tectipennis (Endrödi, 1964)
- Pleuraphodius tectoformibus (Schmidt, 1909)
- Pleuraphodius teter (Roth, 1851)
- Pleuraphodius thomasi (Endrödi, 1973)
- Pleuraphodius umbilicatus (Bordat, 1996)
- Pleuraphodius vespuccii (Petrovitz, 1972)
- Pleuraphodius viscaensis (Stebnicka, 1993)
- Pleuraphodius wardi (Bordat, 1994)
