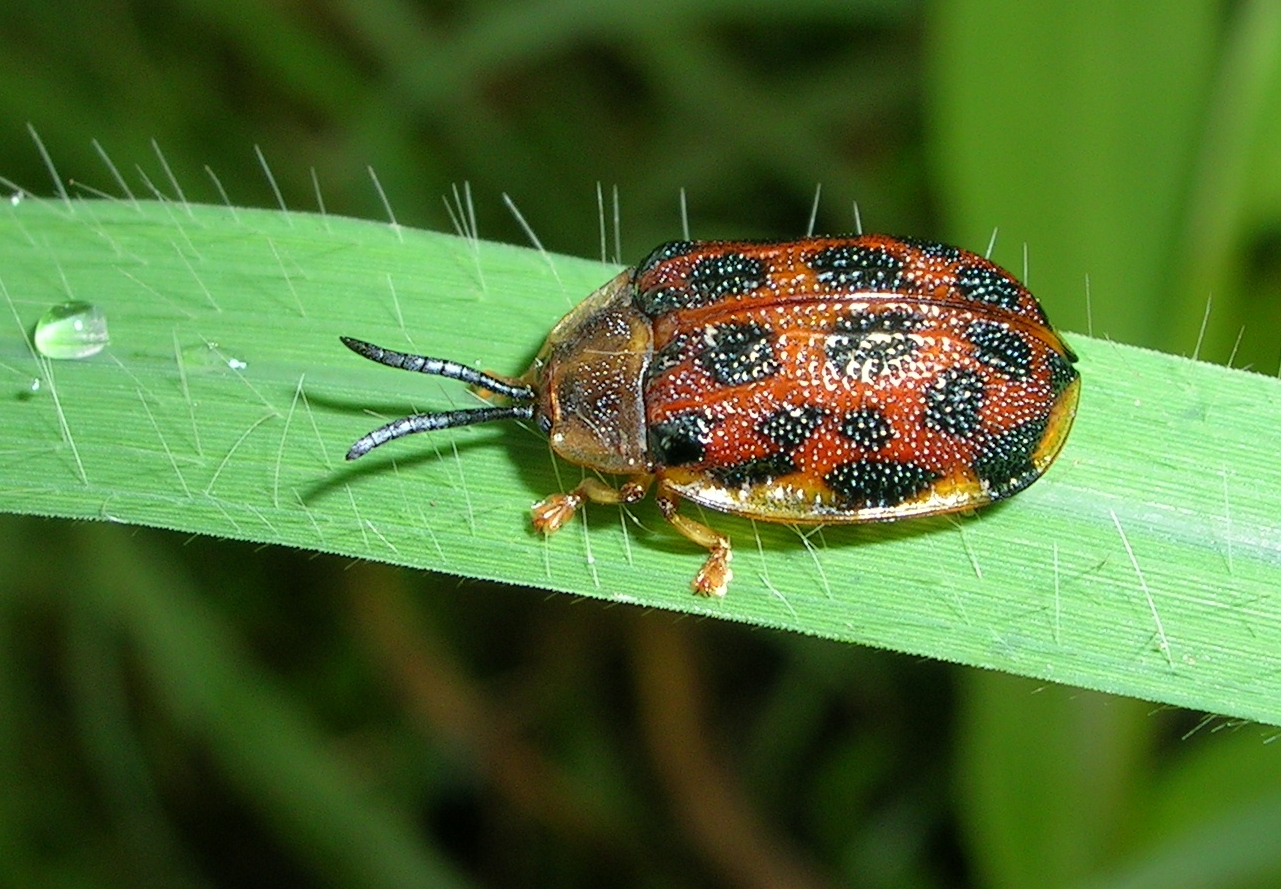

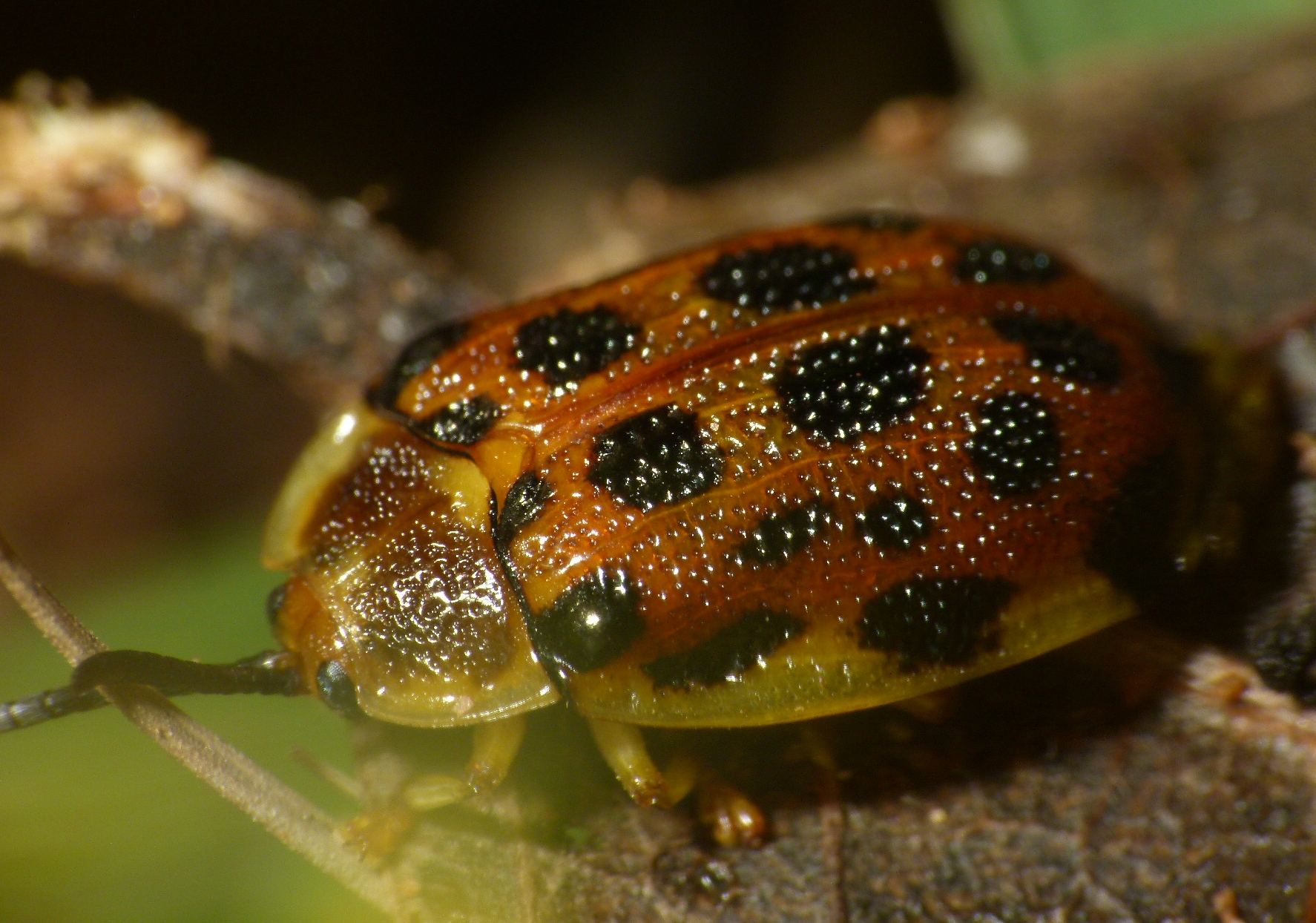

Scientific classification
- Kingdom: Animalia
- Phylum: Arthropoda
- Clade: Pancrustacea
- Class: Insecta
- Order: Coleoptera
- Suborder: Polyphaga
- Infraorder: Cucujiformia
- Family: Chrysomelidae
- Genus: Epistictina
- Species: E. reicheana

Binomial name
- Epistictina reicheana Guérin-Méneville 1844

= Epistictina reicheana =

Species of beetle

Epistictina reicheana, is a species of leaf beetle found in India, Nepal, Sri Lanka and Tasmania.

== Description ==
It is a medium-sized beetle. Body oval. Elytra dark reddish in color with many dark patches. Larva dark brown in color with a distinct pattern. Final instar grub is about 10 to 11 mm in length. Head and legs are much darker. Body covered with setae. Pupa is about 8.3 mm long. Pupa without urogomphi or apical processes. Sixth and seventh abdominal segments are also absent.

== Biology ==
The host plant is Stereospermum tetragonum. Adult female lays eggs on the upper surface of the leaf which are deposited in egg masses or within ootheca. Ootheca is made of brownish translucent material, but appears yellowish. After hatching, first instar grub starts to scrape the upper surface of the leaf. Second to the fifth instar grubs are voracious predators which cut net-like holes in the leaf surface. Larva generally carry fecal threads which are attached to supra anal spines. These threads are useful during pupation.
