= Conognatha brevicollis =

Scientific classification
- Kingdom: Animalia
- Phylum: Arthropoda
- Clade: Pancrustacea
- Class: Insecta
- Order: Coleoptera
- Suborder: Polyphaga
- Infraorder: Elateriformia
- Family: Buprestidae
- Genus: Conognatha
- Species: C. brevicollis

Binomial name
- Conognatha brevicollis (Kirsch, 1866)

Synonyms
- Stigmodera brevicollis Kirsch, 1866; Pithiscus waterhousei Obenberger, 1924

Species of beetle

Conognatha brevicollis is a species of beetle of the family Buprestidae. It is found in Colombia.
