= Androya (beetle) =

Scientific classification
- Kingdom: Animalia
- Phylum: Arthropoda
- Clade: Pancrustacea
- Class: Insecta
- Order: Coleoptera
- Suborder: Polyphaga
- Infraorder: Cucujiformia
- Family: Chrysomelidae
- Subfamily: Cassidinae
- Tribe: Basiprionotini
- Genus: Androya; Spaeth, 1911

Genus of leaf beetles

Androya is a genus of leaf beetles of the family Chrysomelidae.

== Species ==
- Androya impressicollis (Fairmaire, 1901)
- Androya longula (Fairmaire, 1901)
- Androya obscuricollis (Fairmaire, 1903)
- Androya rubrocostata (Fairmaire, 1898)
- Androya tenuecostata (Fairmaire, 1899)
