= Acrossoides brittoni =

Scientific classification
- Kingdom: Animalia
- Phylum: Arthropoda
- Clade: Pancrustacea
- Class: Insecta
- Order: Coleoptera
- Suborder: Polyphaga
- Infraorder: Scarabaeiformia
- Family: Scarabaeidae
- Genus: Acrossoides
- Species: A. brittoni

Binomial name
- Acrossoides brittoni (Stebnicka & Howden, 1995)

Synonyms
- Acrossidius brittoni Stebnicka & Howden, 1995

Species of beetle

Acrossoides brittoni is a species of beetle of the family Scarabaeidae. It is found in Australia (South Australia).

== Description ==
Adults reach a length of about 9.5–12 mm (0.37–0.47 in). They have a castaneous, shining body.
