= Stephanopachys hispidulus =

Scientific classification
- Kingdom: Animalia
- Phylum: Arthropoda
- Class: Insecta
- Order: Coleoptera
- Suborder: Polyphaga
- Family: Bostrichidae
- Genus: Stephanopachys
- Species: S. hispidulus

Binomial name
- Stephanopachys hispidulus (Casey, 1898)

Species of beetle

Stephanopachys hispidulus is a species of horned powder-post beetle in the family Bostrichidae. It is found in North America.
