= Prosopodonta balyi =

Scientific classification
- Kingdom: Animalia
- Phylum: Arthropoda
- Class: Insecta
- Order: Coleoptera
- Suborder: Polyphaga
- Infraorder: Cucujiformia
- Family: Chrysomelidae
- Genus: Prosopodonta
- Species: P. balyi

Binomial name
- Prosopodonta balyi Weise, 1905

Synonyms
- Prosopodonta costata Baly, 1885 (preocc.)

Species of beetle

Prosopodonta balyi is a species of beetle of the family Chrysomelidae. It is found in Panama.

== Description ==
The head is smooth and shining and the face is armed between the antennae with an acute tooth. The antennae are rather longer than the head and thorax, distinctly thickened towards the apex. The thorax is rather broader than long, with the sides obtusely rounded, obsoletely angulate immediately behind and again just before the middle, straight and slightly diverging at the base, converging from the middle to the apex, the apical angle not produced, obtuse. The upper surface is convex, smooth and shining, impressed on the sides and hinder disc with large deep punctures. The elytra are oblong, subparallel, regularly rounded at the apex and strongly punctate-striate. The striae (nine at the extreme base and eight on the rest of the surface) are arranged in double rows. The alternate interspaces are slightly elevated, the second and fourth from the suture more strongly thickened, costate.

== Biology ==
The food plant is unknown.
