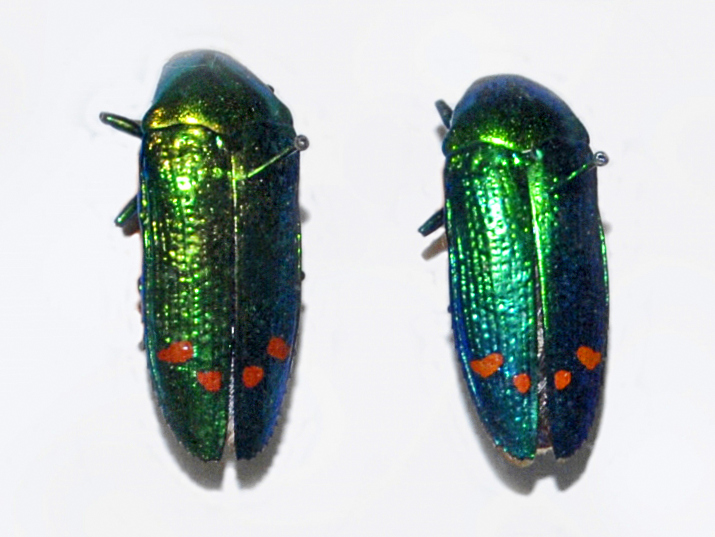
- Conognatha pretiosissima

Scientific classification
- Kingdom: Animalia
- Phylum: Arthropoda
- Clade: Pancrustacea
- Class: Insecta
- Order: Coleoptera
- Suborder: Polyphaga
- Infraorder: Elateriformia
- Family: Buprestidae
- Genus: Conognatha; Eschscholtz, 1829

= Conognatha =

Genus of beetles

Conognatha is a genus of beetles in the family Buprestidae, tribe Stigmoderini, containing the following species: They are found in the Neotropical realm.

- Conognatha abdominalis Waterhouse, 1912
- Conognatha acuminata Thomson, 1878
- Conognatha amoena (Kirby, 1818)
- Conognatha apicalis Waterhouse, 1912
- Conognatha auricollis (Mannerheim, 1837)
- Conognatha azarae (Philippi & Philippi, 1860)
- Conognatha azurea (Philippi, 1859)
- Conognatha badenii Saunders, 1872
- Conognatha batesii Saunders, 1869
- Conognatha bifasciata Waterhouse, 1882
- Conognatha brevicollis (Kirsch, 1866)
- Conognatha buqueti (Gory & Laporte, 1838)
- Conognatha callioma Théry, 1932
- Conognatha carlosvidali Moore, 2008
- Conognatha celineae Moore & Lander, 2010
- Conognatha chabrillaci Thomson, 1878
- Conognatha chalybaeofasciata (Germain & Kerremans, 1906)
- Conognatha chalybeiventris (Fairmaire & Germain, 1858)
- Conognatha chiliensis (Guérin-Méneville, 1830)
- Conognatha clara Erichson, 1848
- Conognatha coeruleipennis (Obenberger, 1922)
- Conognatha compta (Perty, 1830)
- Conognatha costipennis (Germain, 1856)
- Conognatha elegantissima (Obenberger, 1922)
- Conognatha elongata (Kerremans, 1903)
- Conognatha errata (Fairmaire, 1867)
- Conognatha excellens (Klug, 1825)
- Conognatha eximia Saunders, 1869
- Conognatha fasciata (Gory & Laporte, 1838)
- Conognatha germaini Théry in Hoscheck, 1934
- Conognatha gounellei (Kerremans, 1903)
- Conognatha haemorrhoidalis (Olivier, 1790)
- Conognatha hamatifera (Gory, 1841)
- Conognatha hauseri Obenberger, 1928
- Conognatha humeralis (Philippi, 1859)
- Conognatha impressipennis Saunders, 1871
- Conognatha inornata Rothkirch, 1912
- Conognatha insignis (Perty, 1830)
- Conognatha interrupta Waterhouse, 1882
- Conognatha iris (Olivier, 1790)
- Conognatha juno (Gory & Laporte, 1838)
- Conognatha klugii (Gory, 1841)
- Conognatha laticollis (Philippi) in Philippi & Philippi, 1864)
- Conognatha leachi Waterhouse, 1912
- Conognatha lebasii (Mannerheim, 1837)
- Conognatha leechi Cobos, 1959
- Conognatha lesnei Hoscheck, 1934
- Conognatha macleayi (Donovan, 1825)
- Conognatha magellanica (Fairmaire, 1883)
- Conognatha magnifica (Gory & Laporte, 1838)
- Conognatha mayeti Théry, 1904
- Conognatha minor Saunders, 1869
- Conognatha minutissima Hoscheck, 1934
- Conognatha obenbergeri Olave, 1939
- Conognatha octoguttata Waterhouse, 1882
- Conognatha olivacea Saunders, 1869
- Conognatha ovatula Hoscheck, 1931
- Conognatha pallidipennis Théry, 1931
- Conognatha parallela Saunders, 1869
- Conognatha parallelogramma (Perty, 1830)
- Conognatha paranaensis Saunders, 1872
- Conognatha patricia (Klug, 1825)
- Conognatha penai Moore, 1981
- Conognatha percheroni (Guérin-Méneville, 1831)
- Conognatha posticalis Saunders, 1869
- Conognatha pretiosissima Chevrolat, 1838
- Conognatha principalis (Gory & Laporte, 1838)
- Conognatha reichardti Cobos, 1967
- Conognatha rhombofasciata Pineda, Taboada‑Verona & Alzate‑Cano, 2026
- Conognatha rochereaui Théry, 1932
- Conognatha rogersii Saunders, 1872
- Conognatha rufipes Saunders, 1869
- Conognatha rufiventris Waterhouse, 1912
- Conognatha sanguinipennis Mannerheim, 1837
- Conognatha sellovii (Klug, 1825)
- Conognatha semenovi Obenberger, 1928
- Conognatha soropega Gistel, 1857
- Conognatha souverbii (Germain, 1856)
- Conognatha splendens Waterhouse, 1912
- Conognatha subdilatata Saunders, 1869
- Conognatha surinamensis Moore & Lander, 2010
- Conognatha theryi Obenberger, 1934
- Conognatha thoreyi (Chevrolat, 1838)
- Conognatha tomyris Gistel, 1857
- Conognatha viridiventris (Solier, 1849)
