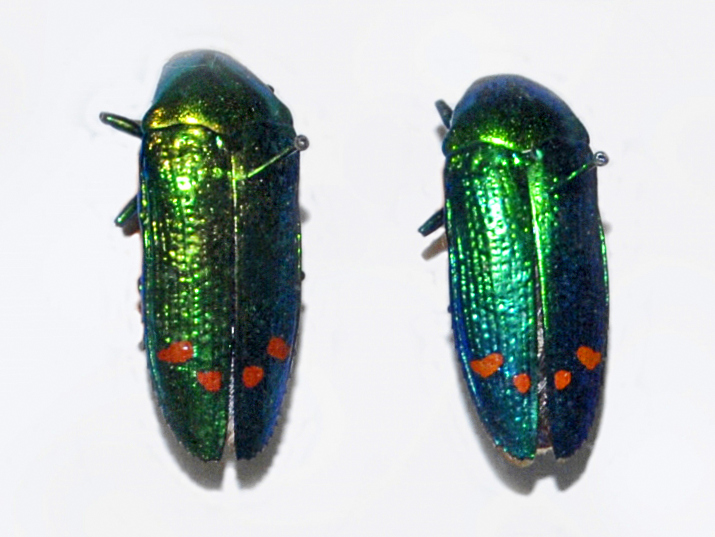
- Conognatha pretiosissima. Mounted specimen.

Scientific classification
- Kingdom: Animalia
- Phylum: Arthropoda
- Class: Insecta
- Order: Coleoptera
- Suborder: Polyphaga
- Infraorder: Elateriformia
- Family: Buprestidae
- Genus: Conognatha
- Species: C. pretiosissima

Binomial name
- Conognatha pretiosissima (Chevrolat, 1938)

= Conognatha pretiosissima =

Species of beetle

Conognatha pretiosissima is a species of beetles in the family Buprestidae.

== Description ==
Conognatha pretiosissima can reach a length of about 23 millimetres (0.91 in). The basic color is metallic green, with four orange band spots on the elytra.

== Distribution ==
This species can be found in Argentina and Brazil.
