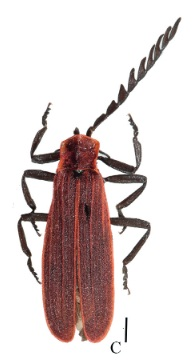

Scientific classification
- Kingdom: Animalia
- Phylum: Arthropoda
- Class: Insecta
- Order: Coleoptera
- Suborder: Polyphaga
- Infraorder: Elateriformia
- Family: Lycidae
- Genus: Macrolycus
- Species: M. breviramus

Binomial name
- Macrolycus breviramus Y. Yang, Du & Liu, 2025

= Macrolycus breviramus =

Species of beetle

Macrolycus breviramus is a species of beetle of the Lycidae family. This species is found in China (Hubei).

Adults reach a length of about 8.7 mm. The colour of their body is black brown, while the pronotum and elytra are dark red with red margins. The surface is covered with decumbent red pubescence.

== Etymology ==
The species name is derived from Latin brevis (meaning short) and ramus (meaning branch) and refers to its short antennal lamellae on male antennomeres VI‒X.
