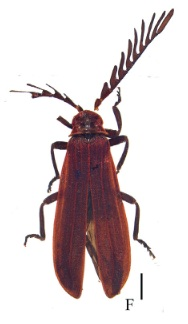

Scientific classification
- Kingdom: Animalia
- Phylum: Arthropoda
- Class: Insecta
- Order: Coleoptera
- Suborder: Polyphaga
- Infraorder: Elateriformia
- Family: Lycidae
- Genus: Macrolycus
- Species: M. acutiapex

Binomial name
- Macrolycus acutiapex Y. Yang, Liu & X. Yang, 2025

= Macrolycus acutiapex =

Species of beetle

Macrolycus acutiapex is a species of beetle of the Lycidae family. This species is found in China (Hubei).

Adults reach a length of about 7.3 mm. The colour of their body is black brown, while the pronotum, elytra and scutellum are dark red. The surface is covered with decumbent red pubescence.

== Etymology ==
The species name is derived from Latin acutus (meaning sharp) and apex (meaning tip) and refers to its lamella of antennomere III with pointed apex.
