= Pleuraphodius vespuccii =

Scientific classification
- Kingdom: Animalia
- Phylum: Arthropoda
- Clade: Pancrustacea
- Class: Insecta
- Order: Coleoptera
- Suborder: Polyphaga
- Infraorder: Scarabaeiformia
- Family: Scarabaeidae
- Genus: Pleuraphodius
- Species: P. vespuccii

Binomial name
- Pleuraphodius vespuccii (Petrovitz, 1972)

Synonyms
- Aphodius (Pleuraphodius) vespuccii Petrovitz, 1972

Species of beetle

Pleuraphodius vespuccii is a species of beetle of the family Scarabaeidae. It was described from Brazil (São Paulo).

== Description ==
Adults reach a length of about 3.5 mm (0.14 in). The body is narrow and weakly arched. The head is densely punctured with the anterior margin somewhat elevated and with the clypeus faintly sinuate. The pronotum has a posterior marginal line. The elytra have somewhat raised interstriae, with the third, fifth and sixth interstriae more elevate than others.

== Status ==
Skelley et al. concluded in 2007 that this species may have been described based on a mislabeled specimen, because the Pleuraphodius genus is considered to be restricted to the Old World.
