= Stephanopachys densus =

Scientific classification
- Domain: Eukaryota
- Kingdom: Animalia
- Phylum: Arthropoda
- Class: Insecta
- Order: Coleoptera
- Suborder: Polyphaga
- Family: Bostrichidae
- Genus: Stephanopachys
- Species: S. densus

Binomial name
- Stephanopachys densus (LeConte, 1866)

Species of beetle

Stephanopachys densus is a species of horned powder-post beetle in the family Bostrichidae. It is found in North America.
