= Metazycera particularis =

Scientific classification
- Kingdom: Animalia
- Phylum: Arthropoda
- Class: Insecta
- Order: Coleoptera
- Suborder: Polyphaga
- Infraorder: Cucujiformia
- Family: Chrysomelidae
- Genus: Metazycera
- Species: M. particularis

Binomial name
- Metazycera particularis Pic, 1932

Synonyms
- Anoplitis (Uroplata) vinula Erichson, 1847

Species of beetle

Metazycera particularis is a species of beetle of the family Chrysomelidae. It is found in Peru.
