= Prosopodonta distincta =

Scientific classification
- Kingdom: Animalia
- Phylum: Arthropoda
- Class: Insecta
- Order: Coleoptera
- Suborder: Polyphaga
- Infraorder: Cucujiformia
- Family: Chrysomelidae
- Genus: Prosopodonta
- Species: P. distincta

Binomial name
- Prosopodonta distincta (Baly, 1885)

Synonyms
- Cheirispa distincta Baly, 1885

Species of beetle

Prosopodonta distincta is a species of beetle of the family Chrysomelidae. It is found in Costa Rica and Panama.

== Description ==
The vertex and front are impunctate, the latter impressed with a longitudinal groove and the lower face is unarmed. The antennae are more than half the length of the body, filiform and very slightly thickened towards the apex. The thorax is broader than long, the sides sinuate and parallel from the base to beyond the middle, then rounded and converging to the apex. The disc is convex, smooth and shining, sparingly punctured on the sides. The elytra are oblong, convex, slightly flattened along the anterior two thirds of the suture, the humeral callus compressed laterally into a short ridge. The surface is regularly punctate-striate, the striae sulcate on the sides and at the interspaces (with the exception of those on the anterior portion of the inner disc) thickened and more or less costate. The anterior thighs in the male are thickened, armed beneath with an acute spine.

== Biology ==
The food plant is unknown.
