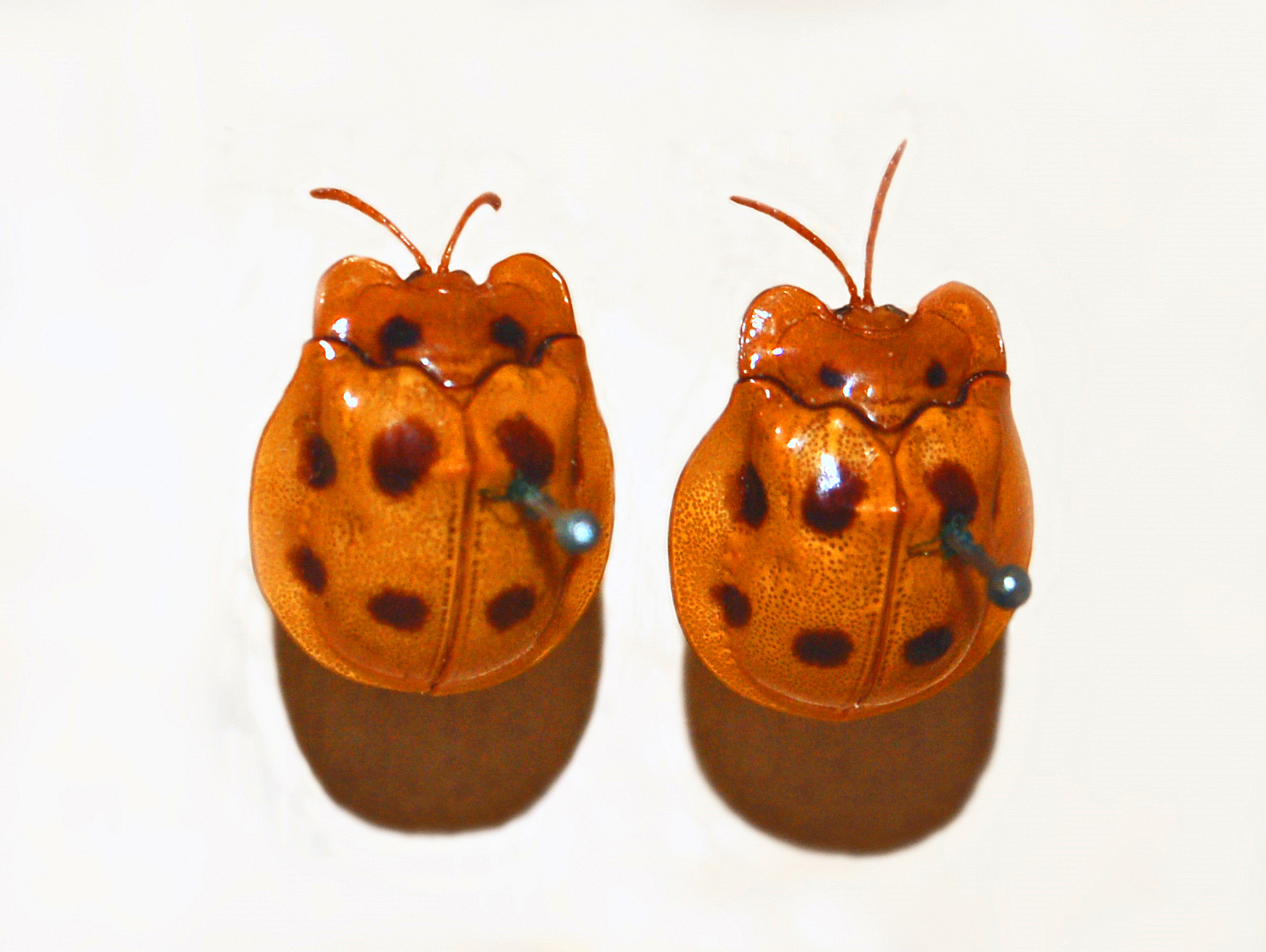
- Basiprionota decempustulata from Sumatra

Scientific classification
- Kingdom: Animalia
- Phylum: Arthropoda
- Clade: Pancrustacea
- Class: Insecta
- Order: Coleoptera
- Suborder: Polyphaga
- Infraorder: Cucujiformia
- Family: Chrysomelidae
- Genus: Basiprionota
- Species: B. decempustulata

Binomial name
- Basiprionota decempustulata (Boheman, 1850)

Synonyms
- Prioptera 10-pustulata Boheman, 1850

= Basiprionota decempustulata =

Species of beetle

Basiprionota decempustulata is a species of beetle belonging to the family Chrysomelidae. This species occurs in Indonesia. Host plants include Clerodendrum species (Verbenaceae).
