= Charles Owen Waterhouse =

English entomologist (1843–1917)

Charles Owen Waterhouse ISO
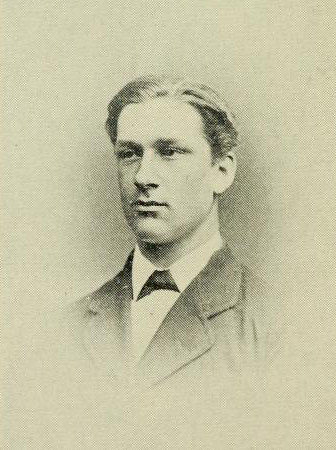
- Born: 19 June 1843
- Died: 4 February 1917 (aged 73)
- Scientific career
- Fields: Entomology
- Institutions: Natural History Museum

Charles Owen Waterhouse ISO (19 June 1843 – 4 February 1917) was an English entomologist who specialised in Coleoptera. He was the eldest son of George Robert Waterhouse.

Waterhouse was an Assistant Keeper at the British Museum (Natural History), London. He wrote the Buprestidae part of Frederick DuCane Godman and Osbert Salvin's Biologia Centrali-Americana (1889) and very many papers on the worldwide beetle collections of the museum, describing hundreds of new species.

He was President of the Royal Entomological Society from 1907 until 1908, and was appointed ISO in the 1910 Birthday Honours. Waterhouse died in February 1917 at the age of 73.

== Notes ==
- Distant, W.L. 1917. [Waterhouse, C.O.] The Entomologist 50: 71–72. BHL
- Evenhuis, N.L. 1997. Litteratura taxonomica dipterorum (1758–1930). Volume 1 (A-K); Volume 2 (L-Z). Leiden, Backhuys Publishers.
- Gahan, C.J. 1917. [Waterhouse, C.O.] Proceedings of the Entomological Society of London 1917: cx–cxii. BHL
- Musgrave, A. 1932. Bibliography of Australian Entomology 1775–1930. Sydney
