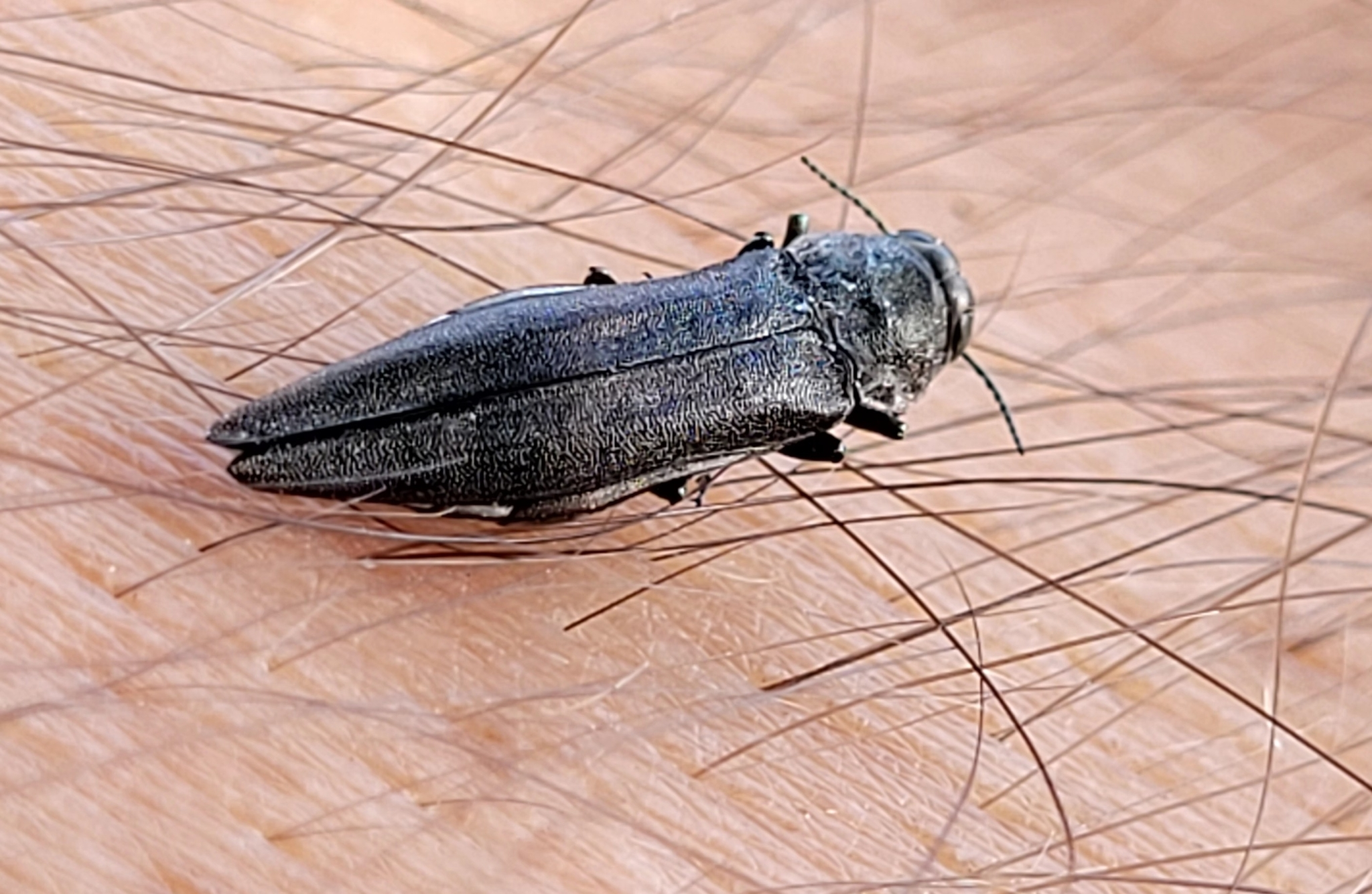

Scientific classification
- Domain: Eukaryota
- Kingdom: Animalia
- Phylum: Arthropoda
- Class: Insecta
- Order: Coleoptera
- Suborder: Polyphaga
- Infraorder: Elateriformia
- Family: Buprestidae
- Genus: Agrilus
- Species: A. granulatus

Binomial name
- Agrilus granulatus (Say, 1823)

= Agrilus granulatus =

Species of beetle

Agrilus granulatus, commonly known as the granulate poplar borer, is a species of metallic wood-boring beetle in the family Buprestidae. It is found in North America.

== Subspecies ==
These four subspecies belong to the species Agrilus granulatus:

- Agrilus granulatus granulatus (Say, 1823)
- Agrilus granulatus liragus Barter & Brown, 1949
- Agrilus granulatus mojavei Knull, 1952
- Agrilus granulatus populi Fisher, 1928
