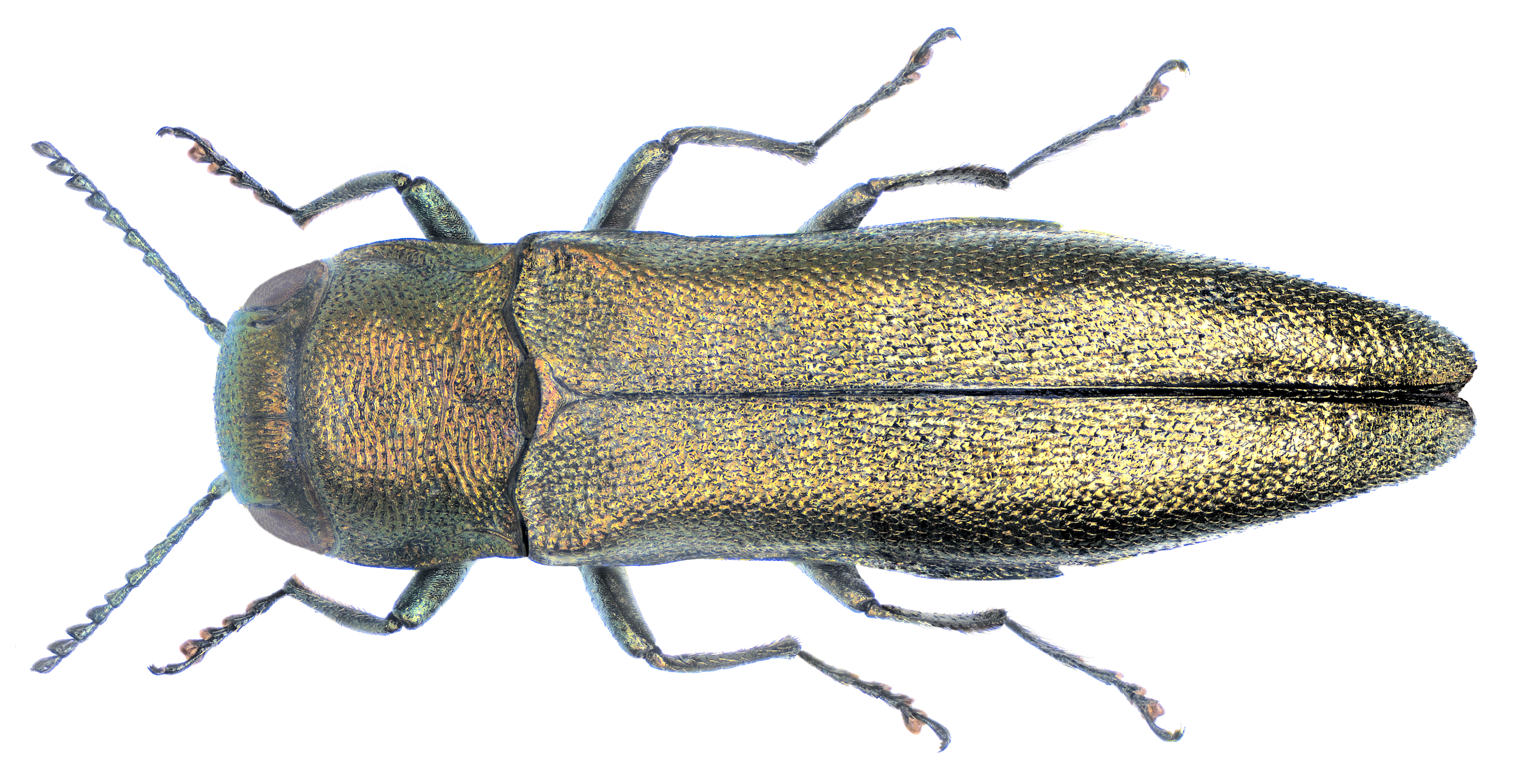

Scientific classification
- Domain: Eukaryota
- Kingdom: Animalia
- Phylum: Arthropoda
- Class: Insecta
- Order: Coleoptera
- Suborder: Polyphaga
- Infraorder: Elateriformia
- Family: Buprestidae
- Genus: Agrilus
- Species: A. roscidus

Binomial name
- Agrilus roscidus Kiesenwetter, 1857

= Agrilus roscidus =

Species of beetle

Agrilus roscidus is a species of metallic wood-boring beetle in the family Buprestidae.

It was scientifically described by Kiesenwetter, 1857.
