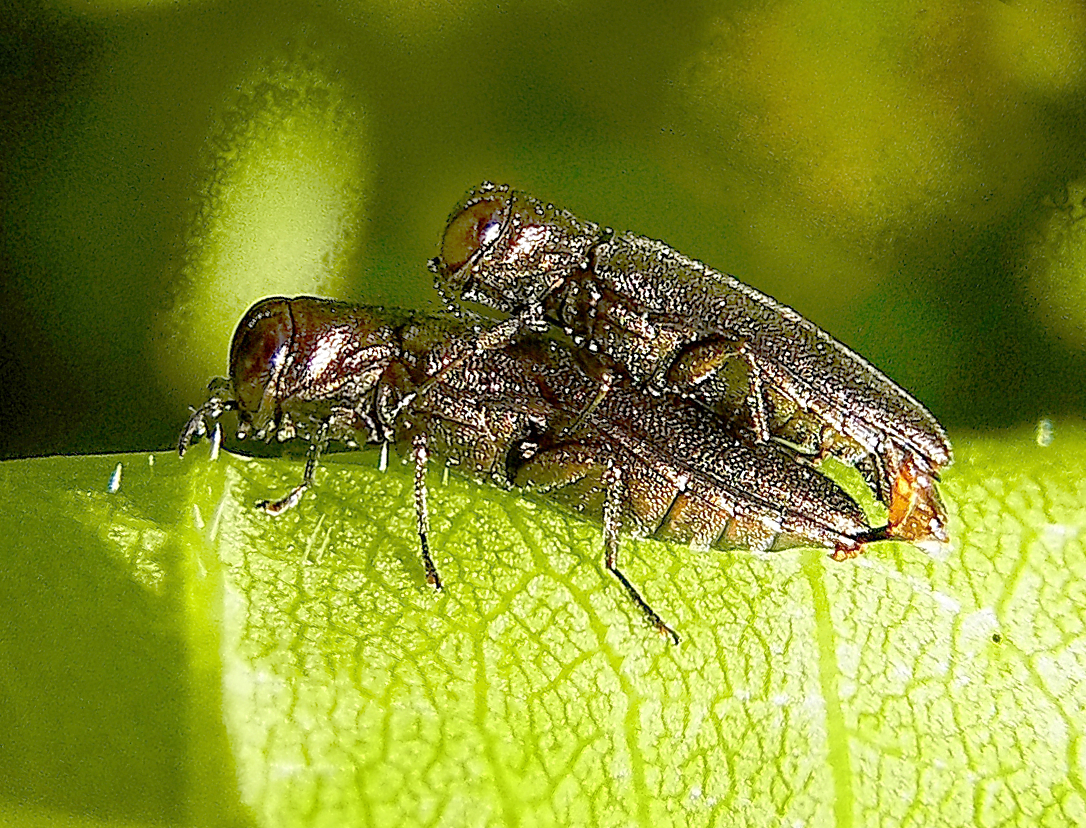

Scientific classification
- Domain: Eukaryota
- Kingdom: Animalia
- Phylum: Arthropoda
- Class: Insecta
- Order: Coleoptera
- Suborder: Polyphaga
- Infraorder: Elateriformia
- Family: Buprestidae
- Genus: Agrilus
- Species: A. derasofasciatus

Binomial name
- Agrilus derasofasciatus Lacordaire, 1835

= Agrilus derasofasciatus =

Species of beetle

Agrilus derasofasciatus, the vine jewel beetle, is a species of metallic wood-boring beetle in the family Buprestidae. It is found in Africa, Europe and Northern Asia (excluding China), and North America.
