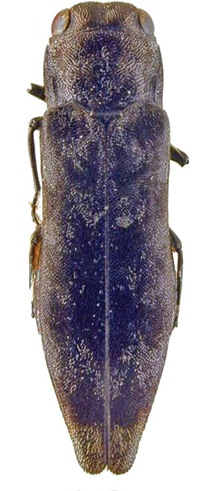

Scientific classification
- Kingdom: Animalia
- Phylum: Arthropoda
- Class: Insecta
- Order: Coleoptera
- Suborder: Polyphaga
- Infraorder: Elateriformia
- Family: Buprestidae
- Genus: Agrilus
- Species: A. auroapicalis

Binomial name
- Agrilus auroapicalis Kurosawa, 1957

Subspecies
- See text

= Agrilus auroapicalis =

Species of beetle

Agrilus auroapicalis is a species of jewel beetle in the genus Agrilus. It can be found in Taiwan.

== Subspecies ==
- Agrilus auroapicalis auroapicalis Kurosawa, 1957
- Agrilus auroapicalis ishigakianus Tôyama, 1985
