= Agrilus auroapicalis ishigakianus =

Scientific classification
- Kingdom: Animalia
- Phylum: Arthropoda
- Class: Insecta
- Order: Coleoptera
- Suborder: Polyphaga
- Infraorder: Elateriformia
- Family: Buprestidae
- Genus: Agrilus
- Species: A. auroapicalis
- Subspecies: A. a. ishigakianus

Trinomial name
- Agrilus auroapicalis ishigakianus Tôyama, 1985

Subspecies of beetle

Agrilus auroapicalis ishigakianus is a subspecies of jewel beetle in the genus Agrilus and the species A. auroapicalis. It is one of two subspecies in A. auroapicalis, the other being Agrilus auroapicalis auroapicalis.
