= Agrilus auroapicalis auroapicalis =

Scientific classification
- Kingdom: Animalia
- Phylum: Arthropoda
- Class: Insecta
- Order: Coleoptera
- Suborder: Polyphaga
- Infraorder: Elateriformia
- Family: Buprestidae
- Genus: Agrilus
- Species: A. auroapicalis
- Subspecies: A. a. auroapicalis

Trinomial name
- Agrilus auroapicalis auroapicalis Kurosawa, 1957

Subspecies of beetle

Agrilus auroapicalis auroapicalis is a subspecies of jewel beetle in the genus Agrilus and the species A. auroapicalis. It is one of two subspecies in A. auroapicalis, the other being Agrilus auroapicalis ishigakianus.
