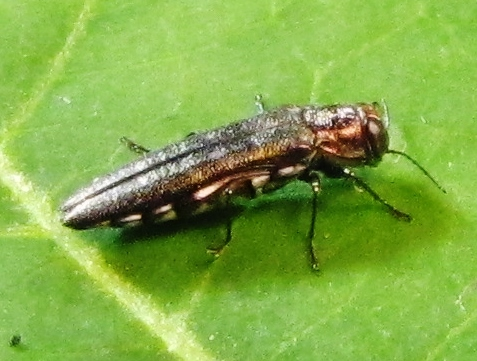

Scientific classification
- Domain: Eukaryota
- Kingdom: Animalia
- Phylum: Arthropoda
- Class: Insecta
- Order: Coleoptera
- Suborder: Polyphaga
- Infraorder: Elateriformia
- Family: Buprestidae
- Genus: Agrilus
- Species: A. quadriguttatus

Binomial name
- Agrilus quadriguttatus Gory, 1841

= Agrilus quadriguttatus =

Species of beetle

Agrilus quadriguttatus is a species of metallic wood-boring beetle in the family Buprestidae. It is found in North America.

== Subspecies ==
These three subspecies belong to the species Agrilus quadriguttatus:

- Agrilus quadriguttatus fulminans Fisher, 1928
- Agrilus quadriguttatus niveiventris Horn, 1891
- Agrilus quadriguttatus quadriguttatus Gory, 1841
