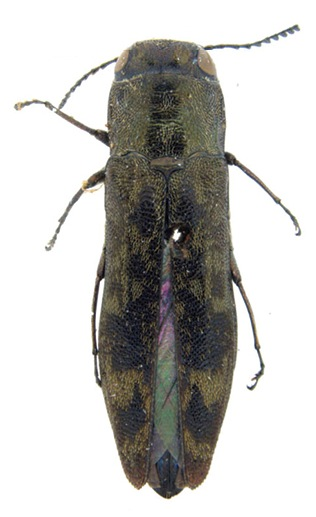

Scientific classification
- Kingdom: Animalia
- Phylum: Arthropoda
- Clade: Pancrustacea
- Class: Insecta
- Order: Coleoptera
- Suborder: Polyphaga
- Infraorder: Elateriformia
- Family: Buprestidae
- Genus: Agrilus
- Species: A. horni

Binomial name
- Agrilus horni Kerremans, 1900

= Agrilus horni =

Species of beetle

Agrilus horni, the aspen root girdler, is a species of metallic wood-boring beetle in the family Buprestidae. It has been found in North America, including in Arizona, South Dakota, Wisconsin, and Michigan.
