= A. blandus =

A. blandus may refer to:

- Abacetus blandus, a ground beetle
- Agrilus blandus, a jewel beetle found in North America
