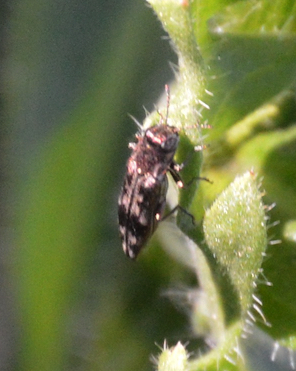

Scientific classification
- Domain: Eukaryota
- Kingdom: Animalia
- Phylum: Arthropoda
- Class: Insecta
- Order: Coleoptera
- Suborder: Polyphaga
- Infraorder: Elateriformia
- Family: Buprestidae
- Genus: Agrilus
- Species: A. lecontei

Binomial name
- Agrilus lecontei Saunders, 1871

= Agrilus lecontei =

Species of beetle

Agrilus lecontei, or Leconte's Brownsville buprestid, is a species of metallic wood-boring beetle in the family Buprestidae. It is found in North America.

== Subspecies ==
These two subspecies belong to the species Agrilus lecontei:

- Agrilus lecontei celticola Fisher, 1928
- Agrilus lecontei lecontei Saunders, 1871
