= A. macer =

A. macer may refer to:

- Abacetus macer, a ground beetle
- Agrilus macer, a jewel beetle found in Central and North America
