= Agrilus parvus =

Scientific classification
- Domain: Eukaryota
- Kingdom: Animalia
- Phylum: Arthropoda
- Class: Insecta
- Order: Coleoptera
- Suborder: Polyphaga
- Infraorder: Elateriformia
- Family: Buprestidae
- Genus: Agrilus
- Species: A. parvus

Binomial name
- Agrilus parvus Saunders, 1870

Species of beetle

Agrilus parvus is a species of metallic wood-boring beetle in the family Buprestidae. It is found in North America.

== Subspecies ==
These two subspecies belong to the species Agrilus parvus:

- Agrilus parvus californicus Westcott & Nelson, 2000
- Agrilus parvus parvus Saunders, 1870
