= Agrilus putillus =

Scientific classification
- Domain: Eukaryota
- Kingdom: Animalia
- Phylum: Arthropoda
- Class: Insecta
- Order: Coleoptera
- Suborder: Polyphaga
- Infraorder: Elateriformia
- Family: Buprestidae
- Genus: Agrilus
- Species: A. putillus

Binomial name
- Agrilus putillus Say, 1833

Species of beetle

Agrilus putillus is a species of metallic wood-boring beetle in the family Buprestidae. It is found in Canada, North America.

== Subspecies ==
These two subspecies belong to the species Agrilus putillus:

- Agrilus putillus parputillus Knull, 1960
- Agrilus putillus putillus Say, 1833
