= Agrilus pulchellus =

Scientific classification
- Domain: Eukaryota
- Kingdom: Animalia
- Phylum: Arthropoda
- Class: Insecta
- Order: Coleoptera
- Suborder: Polyphaga
- Infraorder: Elateriformia
- Family: Buprestidae
- Genus: Agrilus
- Species: A. pulchellus

Binomial name
- Agrilus pulchellus Bland, 1865

Synonyms
- Agrilus martini Obenberger, 1943; Agrilus pinalicus Wickham, 1903

Species of beetle

Agrilus pulchellus is a species of metallic wood-boring beetle in the family Buprestidae. It is found in Central America and North America.
