= Agrilus acutipennis =

Scientific classification
- Domain: Eukaryota
- Kingdom: Animalia
- Phylum: Arthropoda
- Class: Insecta
- Order: Coleoptera
- Suborder: Polyphaga
- Infraorder: Elateriformia
- Family: Buprestidae
- Genus: Agrilus
- Species: A. acutipennis

Binomial name
- Agrilus acutipennis Mannerheim, 1837

Synonyms
- Agrilus latebrus Gory and Laporte, 1837

Species of beetle

Agrilus acutipennis, the spotworm borer, is a species of metallic wood-boring beetle in the family Buprestidae. It is found in North America.
