= Agrilus limpiae =

Scientific classification
- Kingdom: Animalia
- Phylum: Arthropoda
- Clade: Pancrustacea
- Class: Insecta
- Order: Coleoptera
- Suborder: Polyphaga
- Infraorder: Elateriformia
- Family: Buprestidae
- Genus: Agrilus
- Species: A. limpiae

Binomial name
- Agrilus limpiae Knull, 1941

Species of beetle

Agrilus limpiae is a species in the family Buprestidae ("metallic wood-boring beetles"), in the suborder Polyphaga ("water, rove, scarab, long-horned, leaf and snout beetles"). It is found in North America.
