= Agrilus difficilis =

Scientific classification
- Domain: Eukaryota
- Kingdom: Animalia
- Phylum: Arthropoda
- Class: Insecta
- Order: Coleoptera
- Suborder: Polyphaga
- Infraorder: Elateriformia
- Family: Buprestidae
- Genus: Agrilus
- Species: A. difficilis

Binomial name
- Agrilus difficilis Gory, 1841

Synonyms
- Agrilus occidentalis Uhler, 1855

Species of beetle

Agrilus difficilis, the honeylocust agrilus, is a species of metallic wood-boring beetle in the family Buprestidae. It is found in North America.
