= Agrilus floridanus =

Scientific classification
- Domain: Eukaryota
- Kingdom: Animalia
- Phylum: Arthropoda
- Class: Insecta
- Order: Coleoptera
- Suborder: Polyphaga
- Infraorder: Elateriformia
- Family: Buprestidae
- Genus: Agrilus
- Species: A. floridanus

Binomial name
- Agrilus floridanus Crotch, 1873

Synonyms
- Agrilus parafloridanus Knull, 1929

Species of beetle

Agrilus floridanus is a species of metallic wood-boring beetle in the family Buprestidae. It is found in North America.
