= Agrilus gillespiensis =

Scientific classification
- Kingdom: Animalia
- Phylum: Arthropoda
- Clade: Pancrustacea
- Class: Insecta
- Order: Coleoptera
- Suborder: Polyphaga
- Infraorder: Elateriformia
- Family: Buprestidae
- Genus: Agrilus
- Species: A. gillespiensis

Binomial name
- Agrilus gillespiensis Knull, 1947

Species of beetle

Agrilus gillespiensis is a species in the family Buprestidae ("metallic wood-boring beetles"), in the order Coleoptera ("beetles"). It is found in North America.
