= Agrilus pubescens =

Scientific classification
- Domain: Eukaryota
- Kingdom: Animalia
- Phylum: Arthropoda
- Class: Insecta
- Order: Coleoptera
- Suborder: Polyphaga
- Infraorder: Elateriformia
- Family: Buprestidae
- Genus: Agrilus
- Species: A. pubescens

Binomial name
- Agrilus pubescens Fisher, 1928

Synonyms
- Agrilus parapubescens Knull, 1934

Species of beetle

Agrilus pubescens is a species of metallic wood-boring beetle in the family Buprestidae. It is found in North America.
