= Agrilus mimosae =

Scientific classification
- Kingdom: Animalia
- Phylum: Arthropoda
- Clade: Pancrustacea
- Class: Insecta
- Order: Coleoptera
- Suborder: Polyphaga
- Infraorder: Elateriformia
- Family: Buprestidae
- Genus: Agrilus
- Species: A. mimosae

Binomial name
- Agrilus mimosae Fisher, 1928

Species of beetle

Agrilus mimosae is a species of metallic wood-boring beetle in the family Buprestidae. The distribution range of Agrilus mimosae includes Central America and North America.
