= Agrilus subvalidus =

Scientific classification
- Domain: Eukaryota
- Kingdom: Animalia
- Phylum: Arthropoda
- Class: Insecta
- Order: Coleoptera
- Suborder: Polyphaga
- Infraorder: Elateriformia
- Family: Buprestidae
- Genus: Agrilus
- Species: A. subvalidus

Binomial name
- Agrilus subvalidus Kerremans, 1900

Species of beetle

Agrilus subvalidus is a species of metallic wood-boring beetle in the family Buprestidae.

It was scientifically described by Kerremans, 1900.
