= Agrilus crataegi =

Scientific classification
- Kingdom: Animalia
- Phylum: Arthropoda
- Clade: Pancrustacea
- Class: Insecta
- Order: Coleoptera
- Suborder: Polyphaga
- Infraorder: Elateriformia
- Family: Buprestidae
- Genus: Agrilus
- Species: A. crataegi

Binomial name
- Agrilus crataegi Frost, 1912

Species of beetle

Agrilus crataegi, the hawthorn agrilus, is a species of metallic wood-boring beetle in the family Buprestidae. It is found in North America.
