= Agrilus arizonicus =

Scientific classification
- Kingdom: Animalia
- Phylum: Arthropoda
- Clade: Pancrustacea
- Class: Insecta
- Order: Coleoptera
- Suborder: Polyphaga
- Infraorder: Elateriformia
- Family: Buprestidae
- Genus: Agrilus
- Species: A. arizonicus

Binomial name
- Agrilus arizonicus Obenberger, 1936

Species of beetle

Agrilus arizonicus is a species of metallic wood-boring beetle in the family Buprestidae. It is found in Central and North America.
