= Agrilus rubroniger =

Scientific classification
- Domain: Eukaryota
- Kingdom: Animalia
- Phylum: Arthropoda
- Class: Insecta
- Order: Coleoptera
- Suborder: Polyphaga
- Infraorder: Elateriformia
- Family: Buprestidae
- Genus: Agrilus
- Species: A. rubroniger

Binomial name
- Agrilus rubroniger Hespenheide, 1979

Species of beetle

Agrilus rubroniger is a species of metallic wood-boring beetles in the family Buprestidae. It is found in North America.
