= Agrilus crinicornis =

Scientific classification
- Domain: Eukaryota
- Kingdom: Animalia
- Phylum: Arthropoda
- Class: Insecta
- Order: Coleoptera
- Suborder: Polyphaga
- Infraorder: Elateriformia
- Family: Buprestidae
- Genus: Agrilus
- Species: A. crinicornis

Binomial name
- Agrilus crinicornis Horn, 1891

Species of beetle

Agrilus crinicornis is a species of metallic wood-boring beetle in the family Buprestidae. It is found in North America.
