= Agrilus atricornis =

Scientific classification
- Domain: Eukaryota
- Kingdom: Animalia
- Phylum: Arthropoda
- Class: Insecta
- Order: Coleoptera
- Suborder: Polyphaga
- Infraorder: Elateriformia
- Family: Buprestidae
- Genus: Agrilus
- Species: A. atricornis

Binomial name
- Agrilus atricornis Fisher, 1928

Species of beetle

Agrilus atricornis is a species of metallic wood-boring beetle in the family Buprestidae. It is found in North America.
