= List of Dipsacales of Montana =

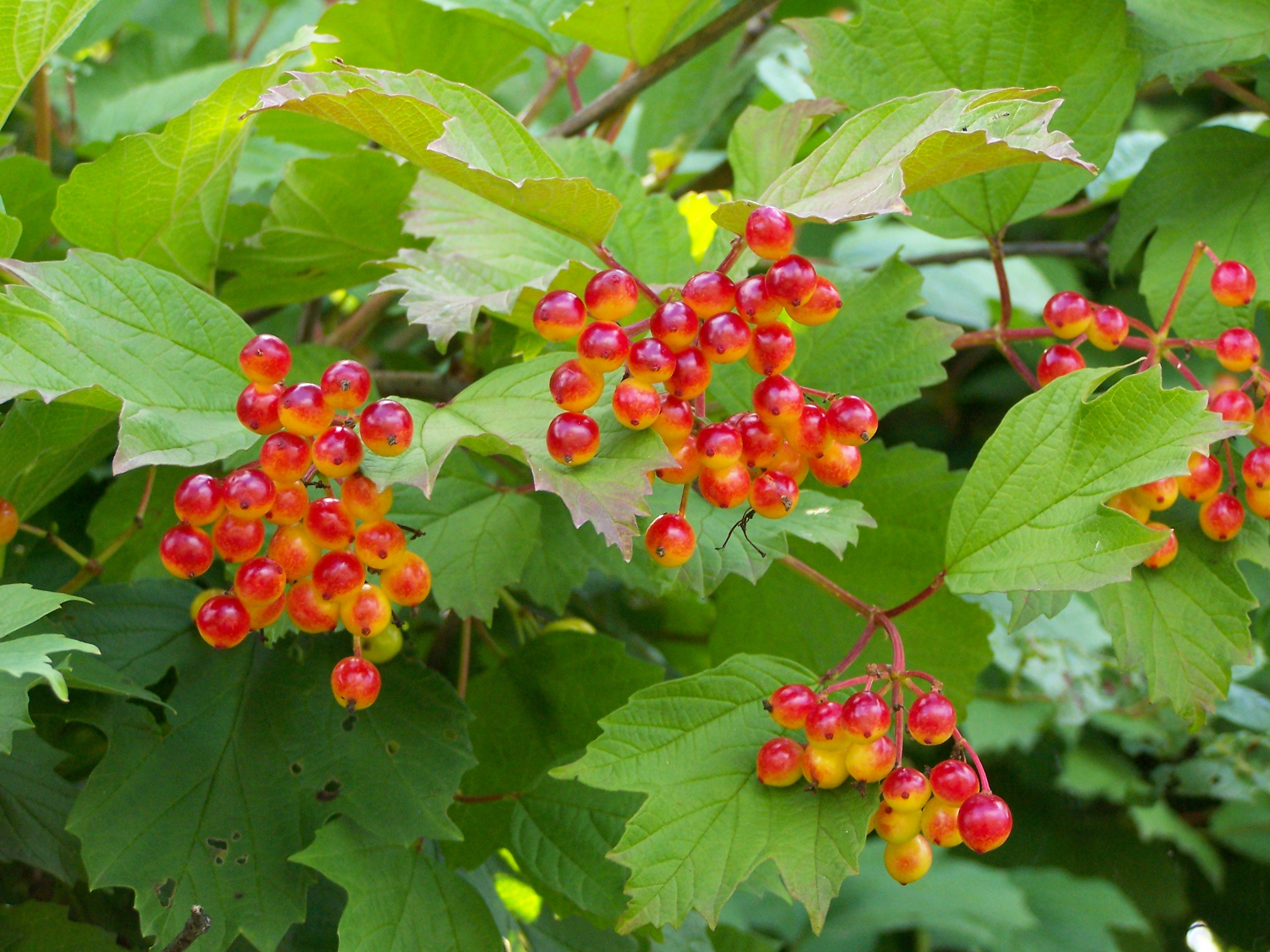
American cranberrybush, Viburnum opulus

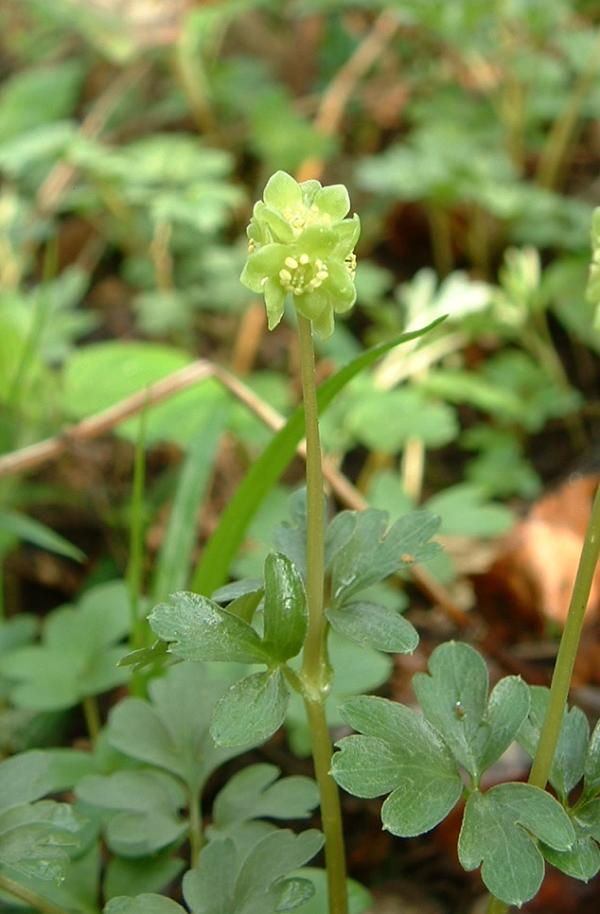
Musk-root, Adoxa moschatellina

There are at least 27 members of the Dipsacales order, Dipsacales, found in Montana. Some of these species are exotics (not native to Montana) and some species have been designated as Species of Concern.

== Honeysuckle ==
Family: Caprifoliaceae

- Linnaea borealis, twinflower
- Lonicera caerulea, western honeysuckle
- Lonicera ciliosa, orange honeysuckle
- Lonicera involucrata, twinberry honeysuckle
- Lonicera morrowii, Morrow's honeysuckle
- Lonicera tatarica, Tatarian honeysuckle
- Lonicera utahensis, Utah honeysuckle
- Sambucus cerulea, blue elderberry
- Sambucus racemosa, red elderberry
- Symphoricarpos albus, common snowberry
- Symphoricarpos occidentalis, western snowberry
- Symphoricarpos oreophilus, mountain snowberry
- Viburnum edule, squashberry
- Viburnum lantana, wayfaring-tree
- Viburnum lentago, nannyberry
- Viburnum opulus, American cranberrybush

== Moschatel ==
Family: Adoxaceae

- Adoxa moschatellina, musk-root

== Teasels ==
Family: Dipsacaceae

- Dipsacus fullonum, fuller's teasel
- Knautia arvensis, blue-button

== Valerian ==
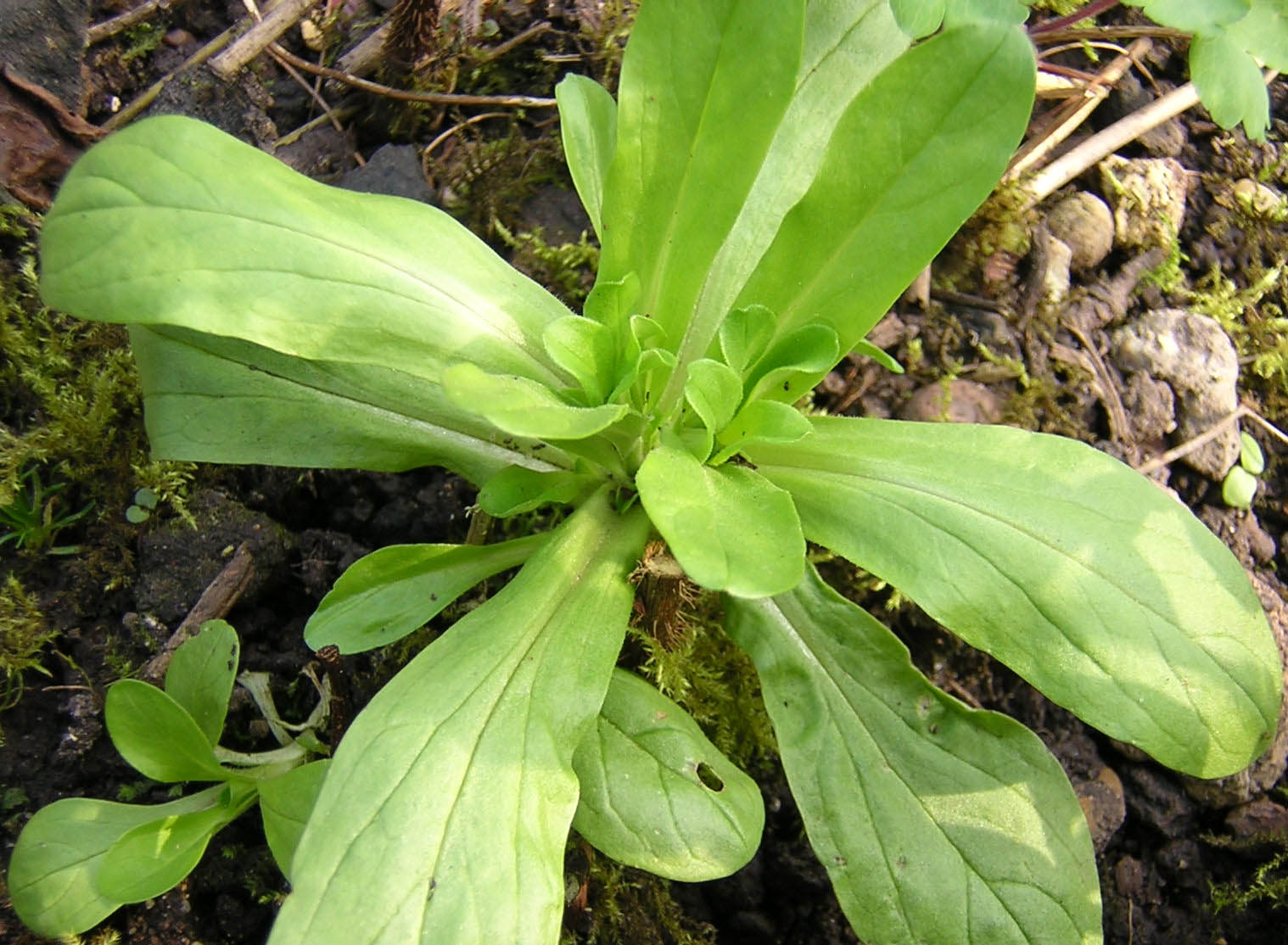
Cornsalad, Valerianella locusta

Family: Valerianaceae

- Plectritis macrocera, white plectritis
- Valeriana acutiloba, Cordilleran valerian
- Valeriana dioica, wood valerian
- Valeriana edulis, hairy valerian
- Valeriana occidentalis, small-flower valerian
- Valeriana scouleri, Scouler's valerian
- Valeriana sitchensis, Sitka valerian
- Valerianella locusta, European cornsalad

== See also ==
- List of dicotyledons of Montana
