= Mitrophora =

Mitrophora may refer to:

- Mitrophora, a genus of plants in the family Caprifoliaceae; synonym of Valeriana
- Mitrophora, a genus of fungi in the family Morchellaceae; synonym of Morchella
