= Valeriana estonica =

Scientific classification
- Kingdom: Plantae
- Clade: Tracheophytes
- Clade: Angiosperms
- Clade: Eudicots
- Clade: Asterids
- Order: Dipsacales
- Family: Caprifoliaceae
- Genus: Valeriana
- Species: V. estonica

Binomial name
- Valeriana estonica Nenjukov, 1933

Species of flowering plant

Valeriana estonica is a species of flowering plant, belonging to the genus Valeriana.

It is endemic to Estonia.
