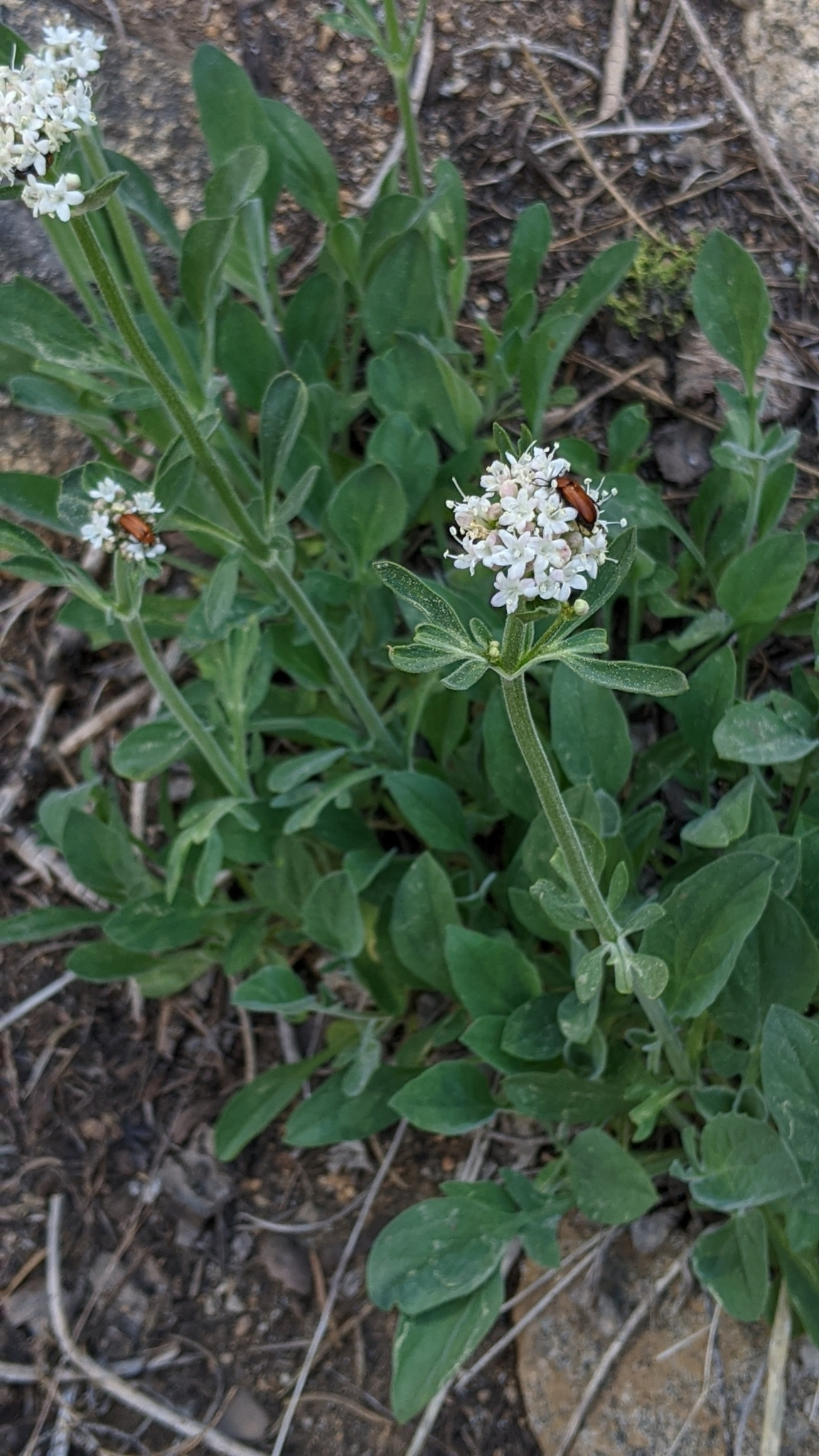

Conservation status
- Secure (NatureServe)

Scientific classification
- Kingdom: Plantae
- Clade: Tracheophytes
- Clade: Angiosperms
- Clade: Eudicots
- Clade: Asterids
- Order: Dipsacales
- Family: Caprifoliaceae
- Genus: Valeriana
- Species: V. californica

Binomial name
- Valeriana californica A.Heller

= Valeriana californica =

Species of flowering plant

Valeriana californica is a species of flowering plant in the honeysuckle family known by the common name California valerian. It is native to Oregon, northeastern California, and Nevada, where it occurs in moist, forested mountain habitat. It is an erect herb up to half a meter tall with whorls or opposite pairs of deeply lobed leaves at intervals along stem. The inflorescence is a cyme of many funnel-shaped white or pink-tinged flowers each about half a centimeter long with three long, protruding stamens. The fruit is a ribbed achene about half a centimeter long which may be tipped with the featherlike remains of the flower sepals.
