= Valerianaceae =

Family of flowering plants

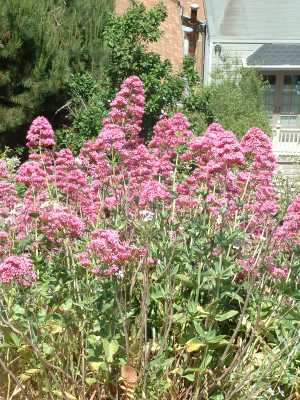
Garden valerian (redspur valerian, genus Centranthus), a common perennial garden plant

The Valerianaceae Batsch, the valerian family, was a family of flowering plants that is now considered part of the Caprifoliaceae. Plants are generally herbaceous, and their foliage often has a strong, disagreeable odor. They are found native in most regions of the world except for Australia. Some species are cultivated as ornamentals or used in herbal medicine for inducing relaxation and sleep.

The genera that were placed in this family, along with some species, include:

- Centranthus

C. ruber (red valerian, spur valerian or red spur valerian)

- Fedia

F. cornucopiae (African valerian, horn of plenty)

- Nardostachys

N. jatamansi (Spikenard)
N. chinensis

- Patrinia
- Plectritis
- Valeriana

V. dioica (marsh valerian)
V. officinalis (valerian)

- Valerianella

V. locusta (corn salad, lamb's lettuce)

DNA studies have found Valeriana to be paraphyletic with respect to Centranthus and Valerianella, and Valerianella with respect to Fedia. Some sources now include Centranthus, Fedia and Valerianella within Valeriana.
