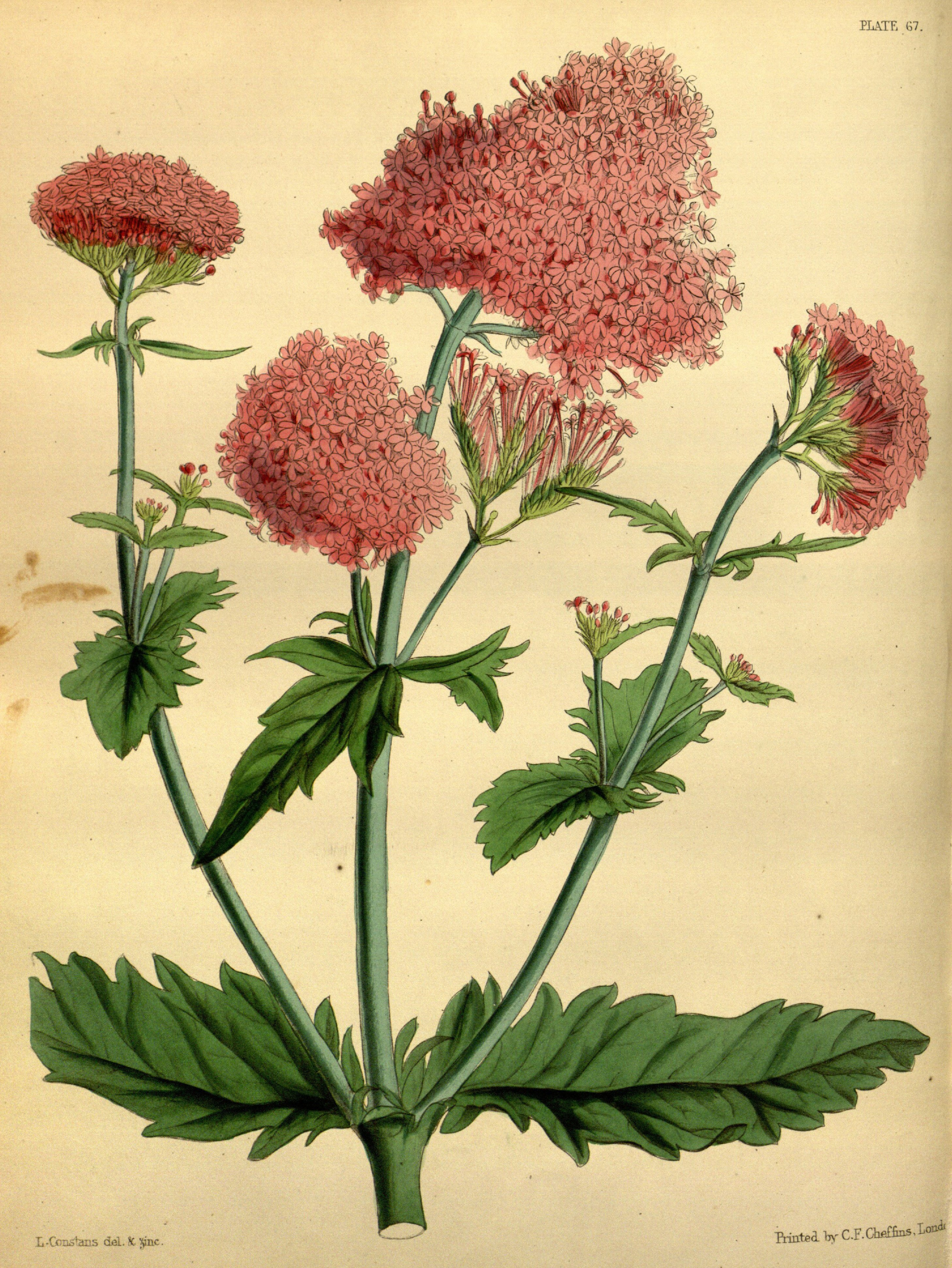

Scientific classification
- Kingdom: Plantae
- Clade: Tracheophytes
- Clade: Angiosperms
- Clade: Eudicots
- Clade: Asterids
- Order: Dipsacales
- Family: Caprifoliaceae
- Genus: Valeriana
- Species: V. macrosiphon

Binomial name
- Valeriana macrosiphon (Boiss.) E.Vilm. (1863)

Synonyms
- Centranthus cadevallii Sennen (1917); Centranthus calcitrapae var. macrosiphon (Boiss.) Pau (1934); Centranthus dasycarpus Kunze (1848); Centranthus macrosiphon Boiss. (1843); Centranthus macrosiphon var. andalusii Fanlo (1986), without type.; Ocymastrum macrosiphon Kuntze (1891); Valeriana cadevallii (Sennen) Christenh. & Byng (2018)

= Valeriana macrosiphon =

Long-spurred valerian

Species of flowering plant

Valeriana macrosiphon, also commonly called long-spurred valerian, is a herb of the family Caprifoliaceae.

The erect annual herb typically grows to a height of 0.1 to 0.4 metres (0 to 1 ft). It blooms in spring and early summer producing pink-red-white flowers.

The species is native to Northern Africa and southwestern Europe but has become naturalised in many areas including the south west of Western Australia.
