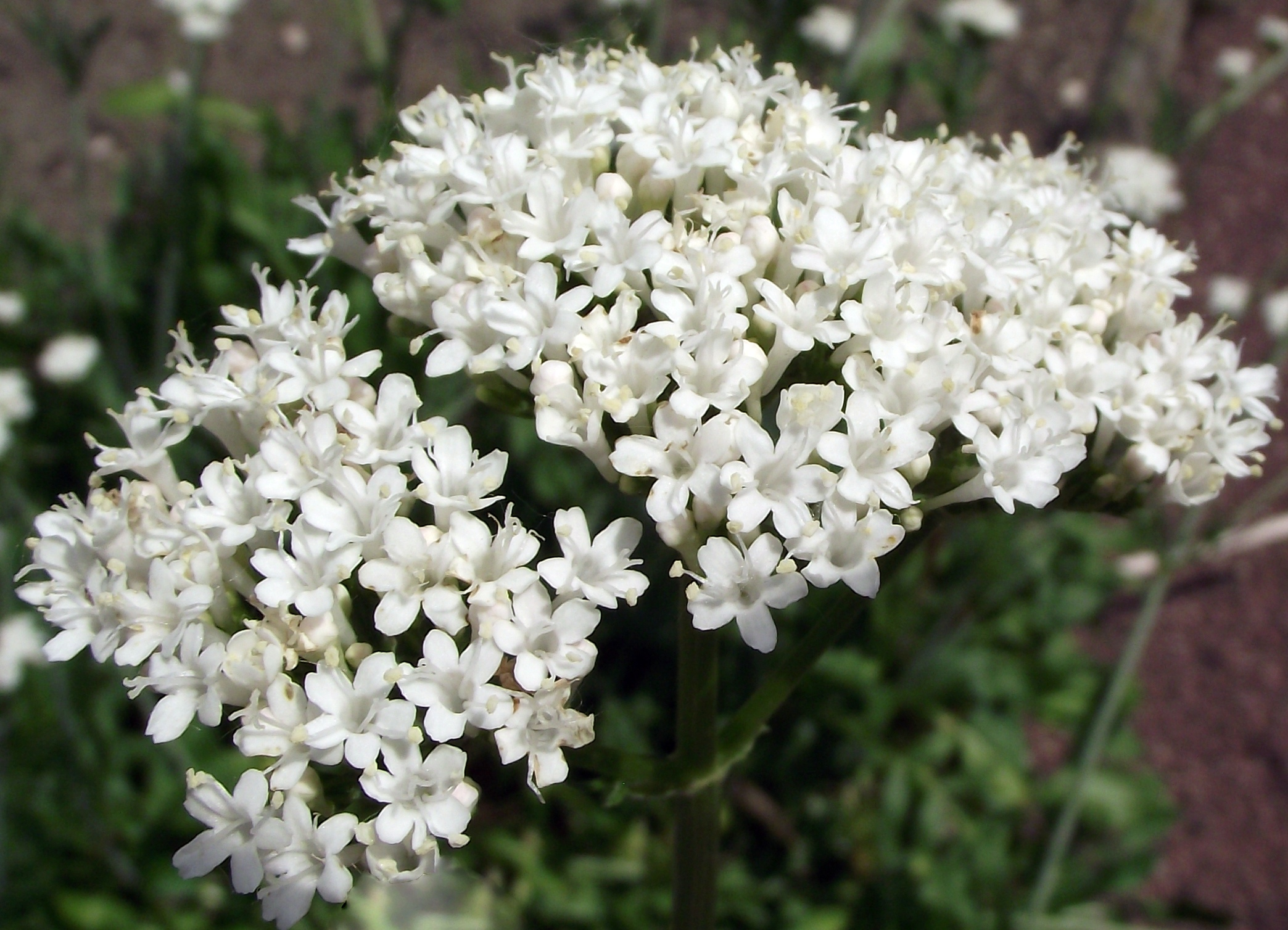
- Flowers form a cymose corymb
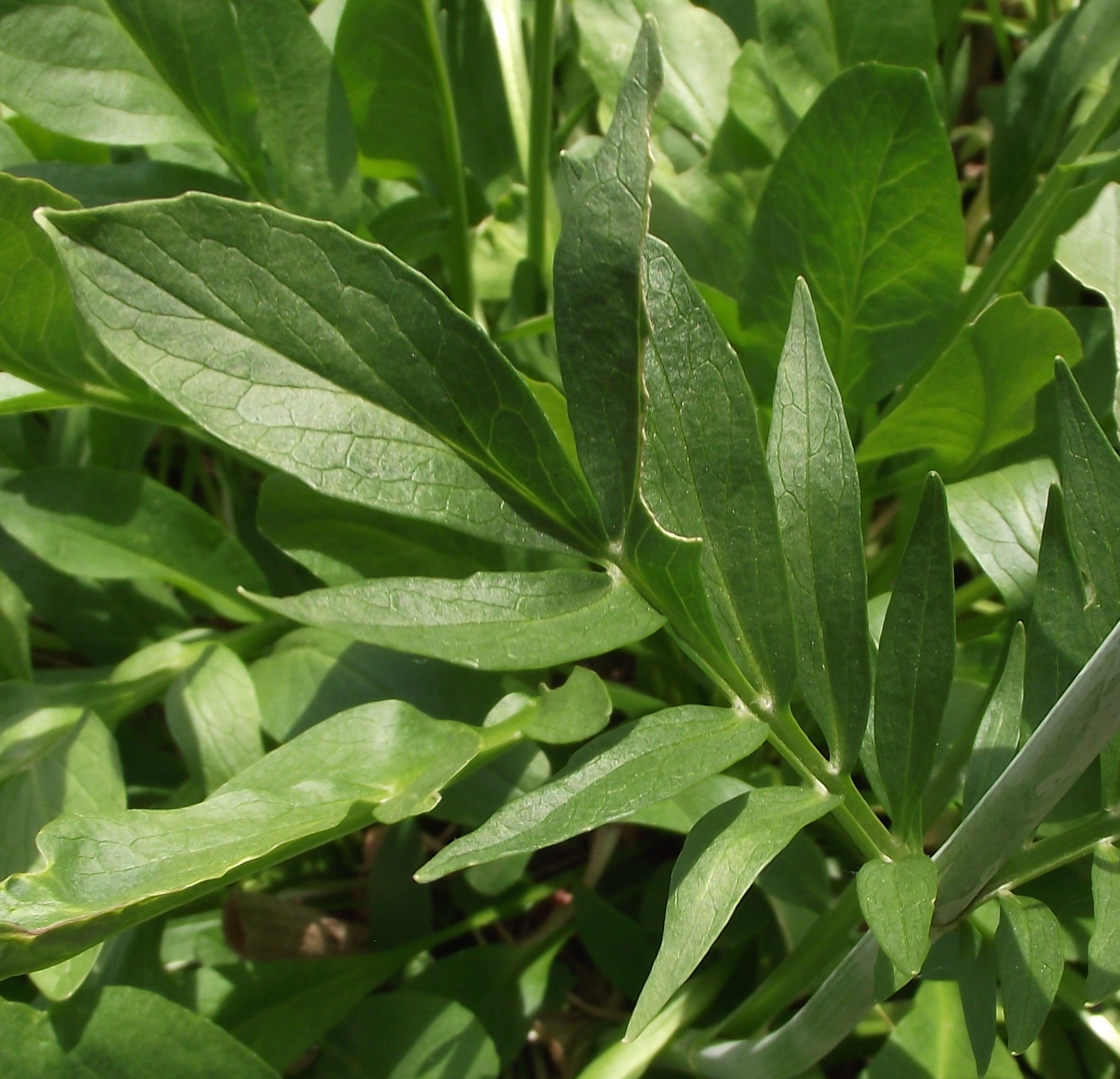
- Foliage

Scientific classification
- Kingdom: Plantae
- Clade: Tracheophytes
- Clade: Angiosperms
- Clade: Eudicots
- Clade: Asterids
- Order: Dipsacales
- Family: Caprifoliaceae
- Genus: Valeriana
- Species: V. phu

Binomial name
- Valeriana phu L.

Synonyms
- Valeriana hortensis Lam.; Valeriana laeta Salisb; Valeriana laevicaulis Stokes

= Valeriana phu =

Species of plant

Valeriana phu, the golden spikenard, is a species of flowering plant in the family Caprifoliaceae, native to northern Turkey. A rhizomatous geophytic perennial reaching 1 to 1.5 m (3 to 5 ft), it has a cultivar, 'Aurea', that is widely available from commercial suppliers.

Its rhizome is sometimes known as V. Radix Majoris and is said to be frequently found mingled with those of valerian root (V. officinalis) in a traditional medicinal preparation offered for sale. It is from 4 to 6 inches long, 1/2 inch in thickness, brown and with a feeble, valerian-like odor and taste.

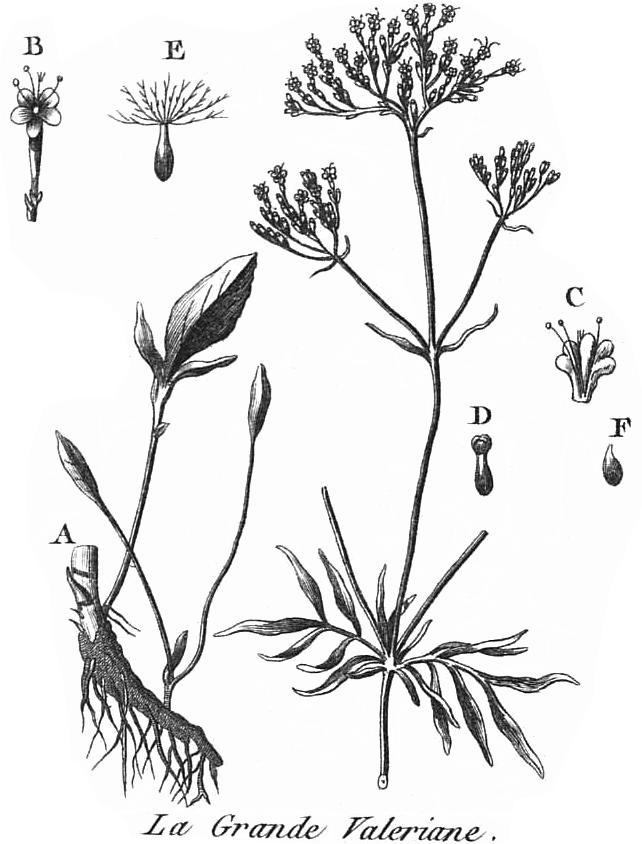
Botanical illustration

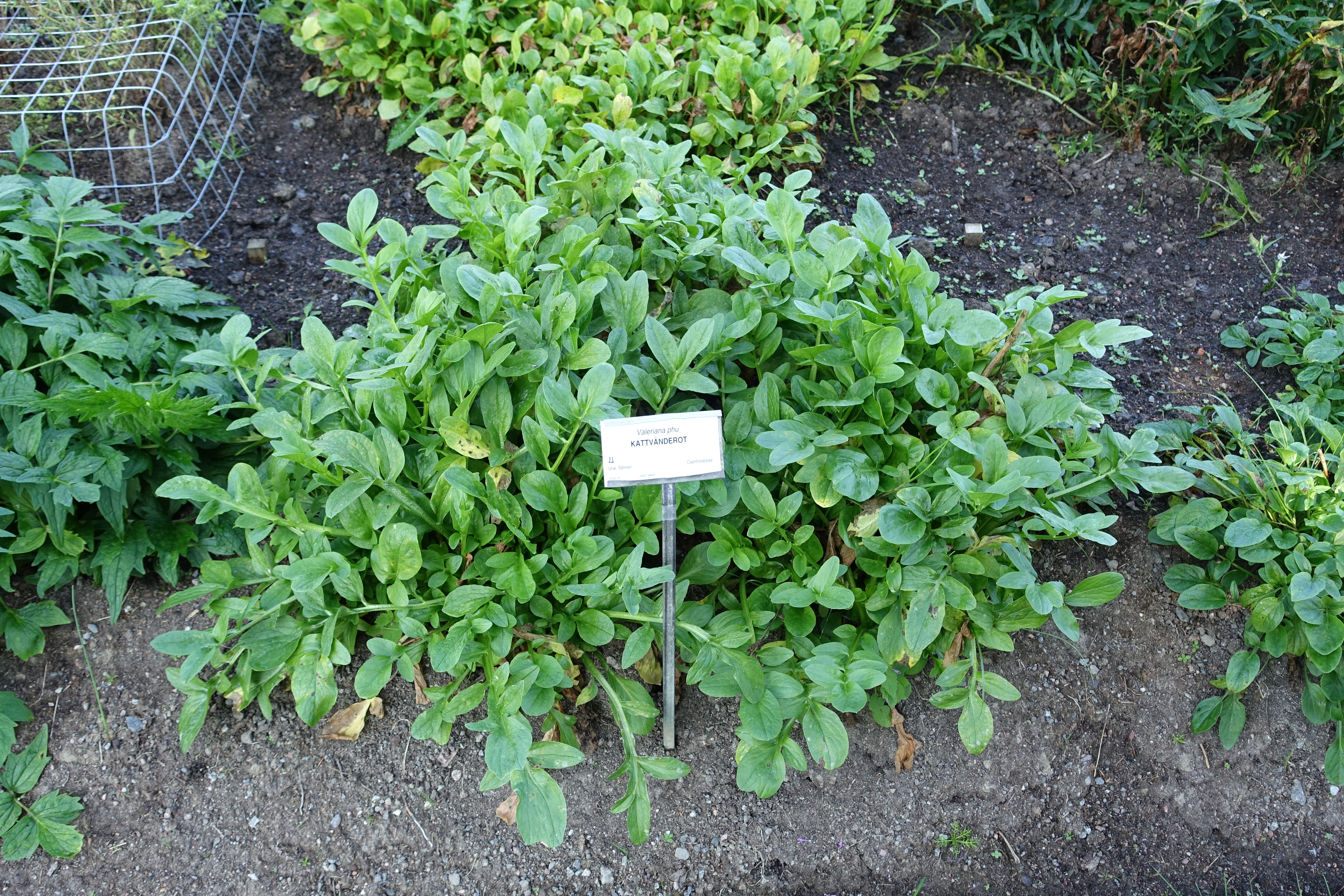
At the Bergianska trädgården
