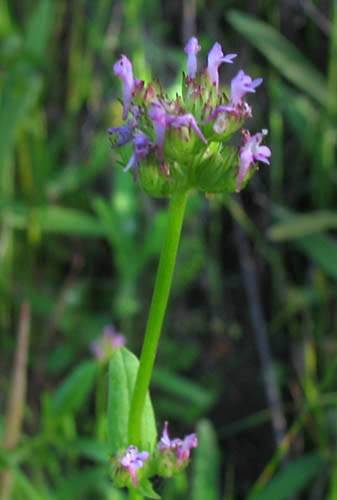

Scientific classification
- Kingdom: Plantae
- Clade: Tracheophytes
- Clade: Angiosperms
- Clade: Eudicots
- Clade: Asterids
- Order: Dipsacales
- Family: Caprifoliaceae
- Genus: Valeriana
- Species: V. ciliosa

Binomial name
- Valeriana ciliosa (Greene) Byng & Christenh. (2018)

Synonyms
- Aligera californica Suksd. (1927); Aligera ciliosa (Greene) Suksd. (1897); Plectritis californica (Suksd.) Dyal (1949); Plectritis ciliosa (Greene) Jeps. (1925); Plectritis macrocera var. ciliosa (Greene) Jeps. (1901); Valeriana hidalgoana Christenh. & Byng (2018); Valerianella ciliosa Greene (1895 publ. 1896)

= Valeriana ciliosa =

Species of flowering plant in the honeysuckle family

Valeriana ciliosa is a species of flowering plant in the honeysuckle family known by the common name longspur seablush. It is native to western North America from Washington to Baja California and Arizona, where it is a common plant in mountains, valleys, and coastal habitats.

It is an annual herb growing erect to a maximum height of 50–80 centimeters (20–31 in). The widely spaced, paired and oppositely arranged leaves are oval or somewhat oblong, smooth-edged, and up to 3 centimeters (1.2 in) long by 1 centimeter (0.4 in) wide. The upper ones lack petioles. The inflorescence is a dense headlike cluster of flowers in shades of bright to pale pink with two darker pink dots on the lower lip. Each flower has a long, slender spur extending downward from the front of the corolla.
