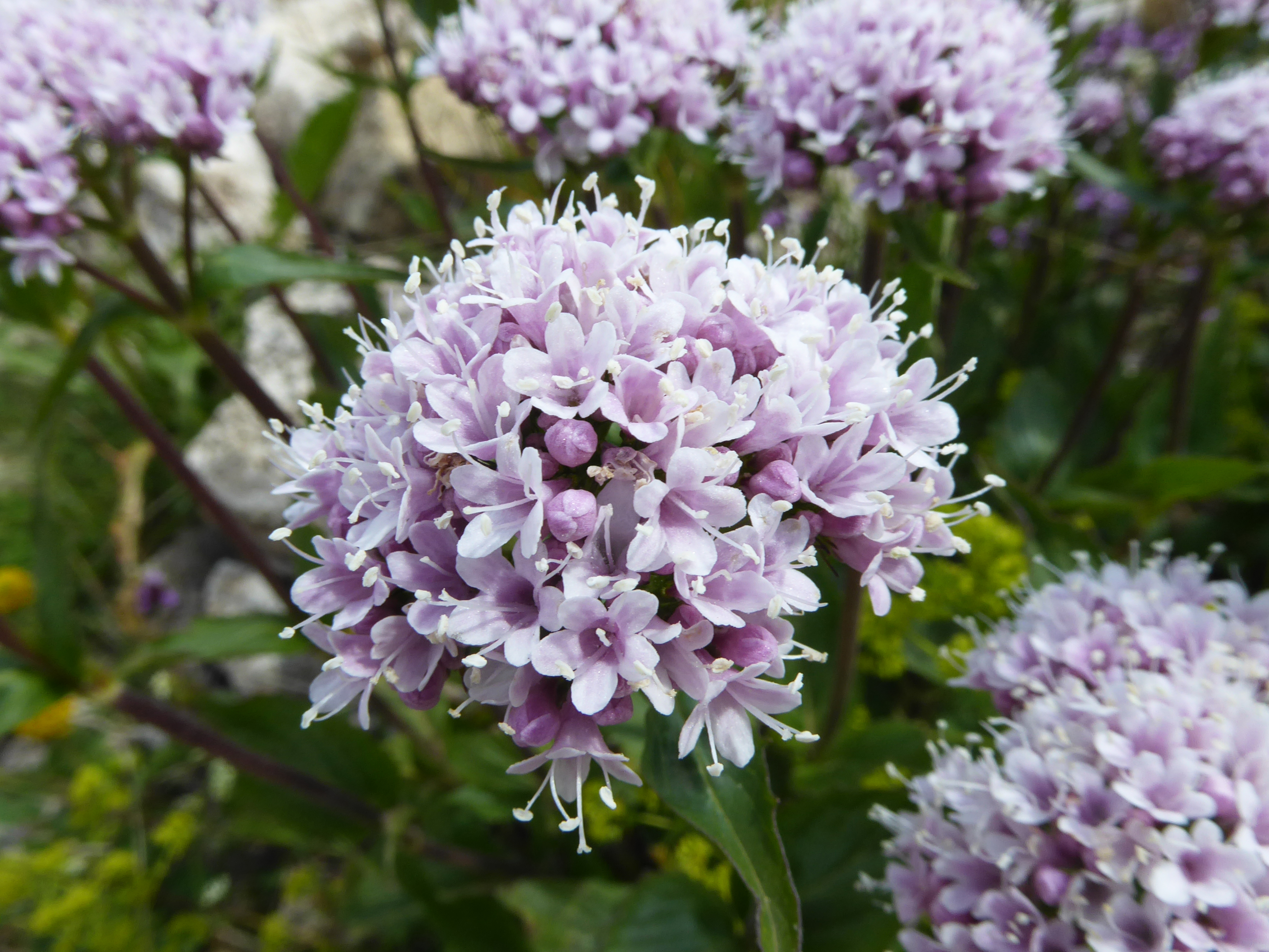
- Flowers in the Dolomites
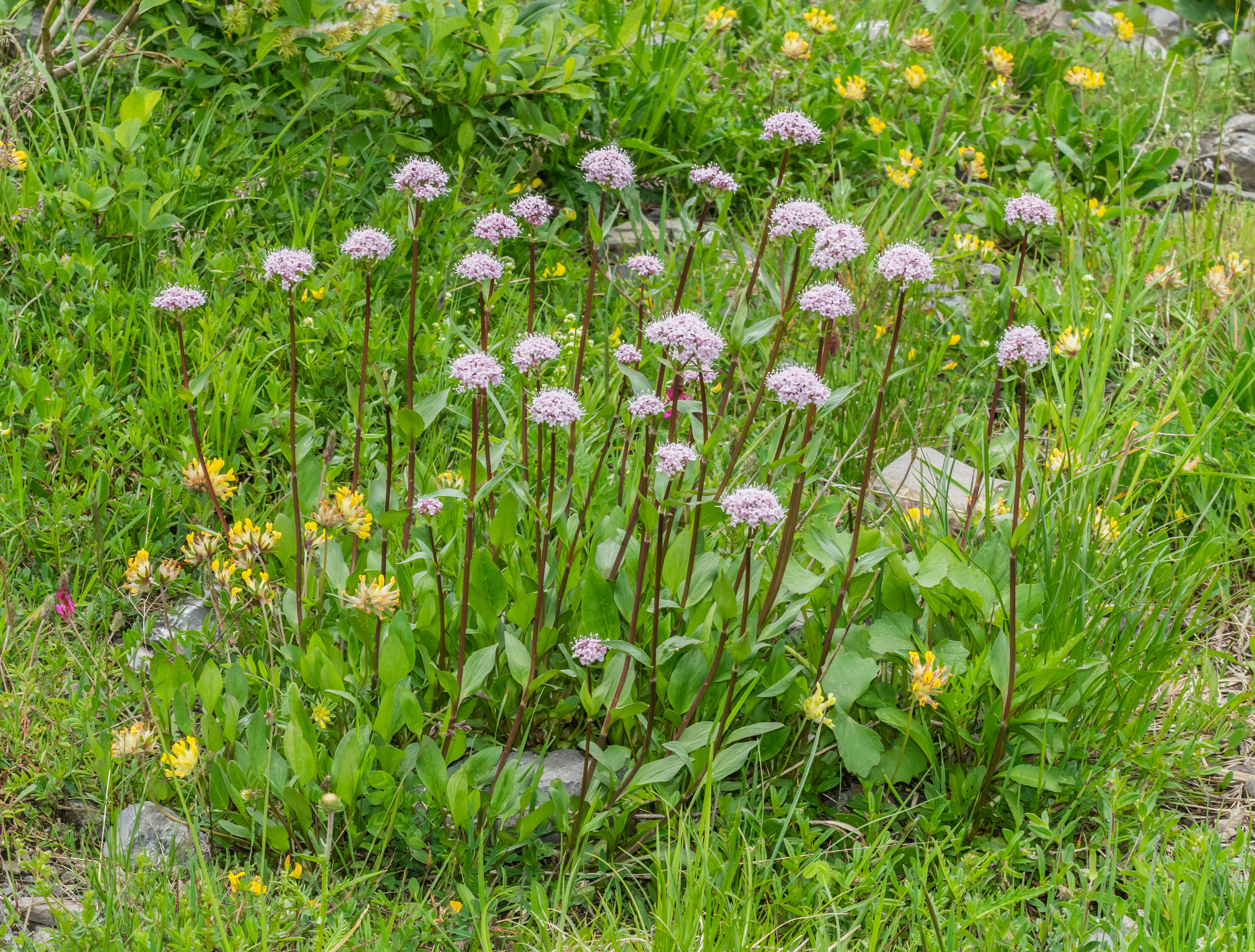
- Habit in Haute-Savoie, France

Scientific classification
- Kingdom: Plantae
- Clade: Tracheophytes
- Clade: Angiosperms
- Clade: Eudicots
- Clade: Asterids
- Order: Dipsacales
- Family: Caprifoliaceae
- Genus: Valeriana
- Species: V. montana

Binomial name
- Valeriana montana L.

Synonyms
- List: Valeriana alpigena Schur; Valeriana ambigua Beck; Valeriana cuspidata Bertol. ex DC.; Valeriana intermedia Sternb. & Hoppe; Valeriana montana subsp. ambigua (Gren. & Godr.) Arcang.; Valeriana montana var. ambigua Gren. & Godr.; Valeriana montana subsp. cuspidata Arcang.; Valeriana montana subsp. hirsuticaulis E.Walther; Valeriana montana var. minor Rouy & E.G.Camus; Valeriana montana subsp. nemorensis F.Martini & Soldano; Valeriana montana var. rotundifolia (Vill.) Mutel; Valeriana montana var. scrophulariifolia (Pourr.) Rouy & E.G.Camus; Valeriana montana var. tarraconensis Pau ex O.Bolòs & Vigo; Valeriana montana var. ternata Schur; Valeriana montana var. ternata Mutel; Valeriana montana var. valentina Pau; Valeriana rotundifolia Vill.; Valeriana rotundifolia var. tripartita Gamisans; Valeriana scrophulariifolia Pourr.; Valeriana sternbergii Beck

= Valeriana montana =

Species of plant

Valeriana montana, the mountain valerian, is a species of flowering plant in the family Caprifoliaceae. Native to the mountains of Europe from east-central Spain, southern Italy, the Alps, the Balkans, and on to the eastern Carpathians, it is available from commercial suppliers.
