= Valeriana alypifolia =

Conservation status
- Least Concern (IUCN 3.1)

Scientific classification
- Kingdom: Plantae
- Clade: Tracheophytes
- Clade: Angiosperms
- Clade: Eudicots
- Clade: Asterids
- Order: Dipsacales
- Family: Caprifoliaceae
- Genus: Valeriana
- Species: V. alypifolia

Binomial name
- Valeriana alypifolia Kunth

Species of flowering plant

Valeriana alypifolia is a species of plant in the family Caprifoliaceae. It is endemic to Ecuador. Its natural habitat is subtropical or tropical high-altitude grassland.
