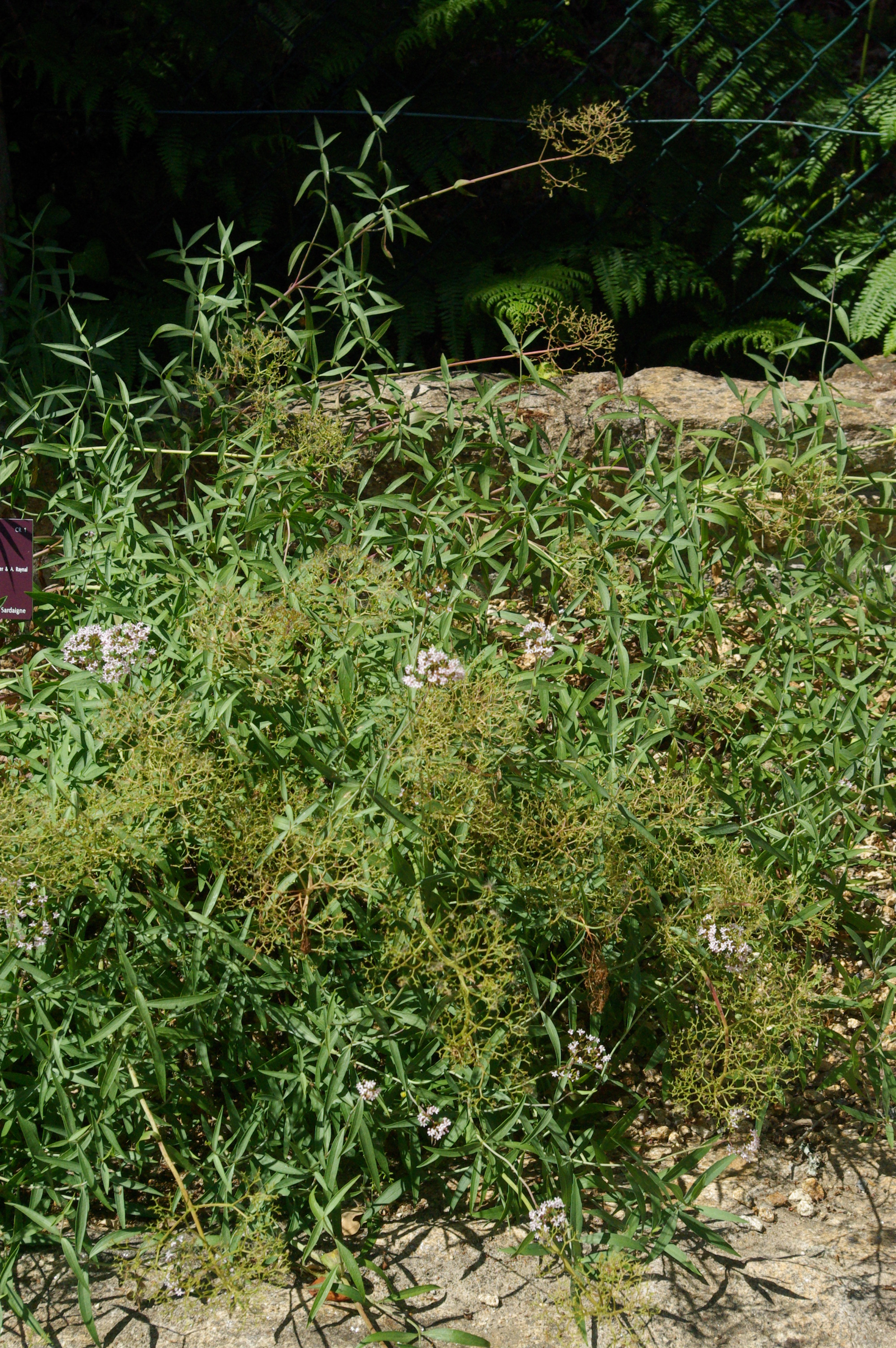

Conservation status
- Critically Endangered (IUCN 3.1)

Scientific classification
- Kingdom: Plantae
- Clade: Tracheophytes
- Clade: Angiosperms
- Clade: Eudicots
- Clade: Asterids
- Order: Dipsacales
- Family: Caprifoliaceae
- Genus: Valeriana
- Species: V. amazonum

Binomial name
- Valeriana amazonum (Fridl. & A.Raynal) Christenh. & Byng (2018)

Synonyms
- Centranthus amazonum Fridl. & A.Raynal (1998)

= Valeriana amazonum =

Species of flowering plant

Valeriana amazonum is a species of plant in the family Caprifoliaceae. It is endemic to the Italian island of Sardinia.

== Distribution ==
Valeriana amazonum occurs in eastern Sardinia, and is only found on Mount Oliena, at about 1,200 metres (3,900 ft) in elevation.

Its natural habitats are in Mediterranean shrubby vegetation and rocky areas.

== Endangered ==
It is an IUCN Red List Critically Endangered plant species, threatened by habitat loss.
