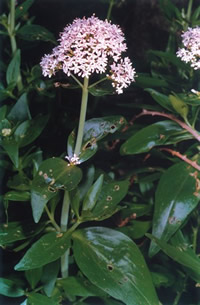

Conservation status
- Endangered (IUCN 3.1)

Scientific classification
- Kingdom: Plantae
- Clade: Tracheophytes
- Clade: Angiosperms
- Clade: Eudicots
- Clade: Asterids
- Order: Dipsacales
- Family: Caprifoliaceae
- Genus: Valeriana
- Species: V. trinervis

Binomial name
- Valeriana trinervis Viv. (1824)

Synonyms
- Centranthus nervosus Moris (1828); Centranthus trinervis (Viv.) Bég. (1903); Ocymastrum trinerve Kuntze (1891)

= Valeriana trinervis =

Species of flowering plant

Valeriana trinervis is a species of plant in the family Caprifoliaceae. It is endemic to Corsica, France where there is a single sub-population near Bonifacio of which the only 140 of the individual plants remain. The common name of the plant is Centranthe à trois nervures in French. Its natural habitat is Mediterranean-type shrubby vegetation. It is currently threatened by habitat loss.

It is considered by IUCN as one of the 50 most endangered species of the Mediterranean area.
