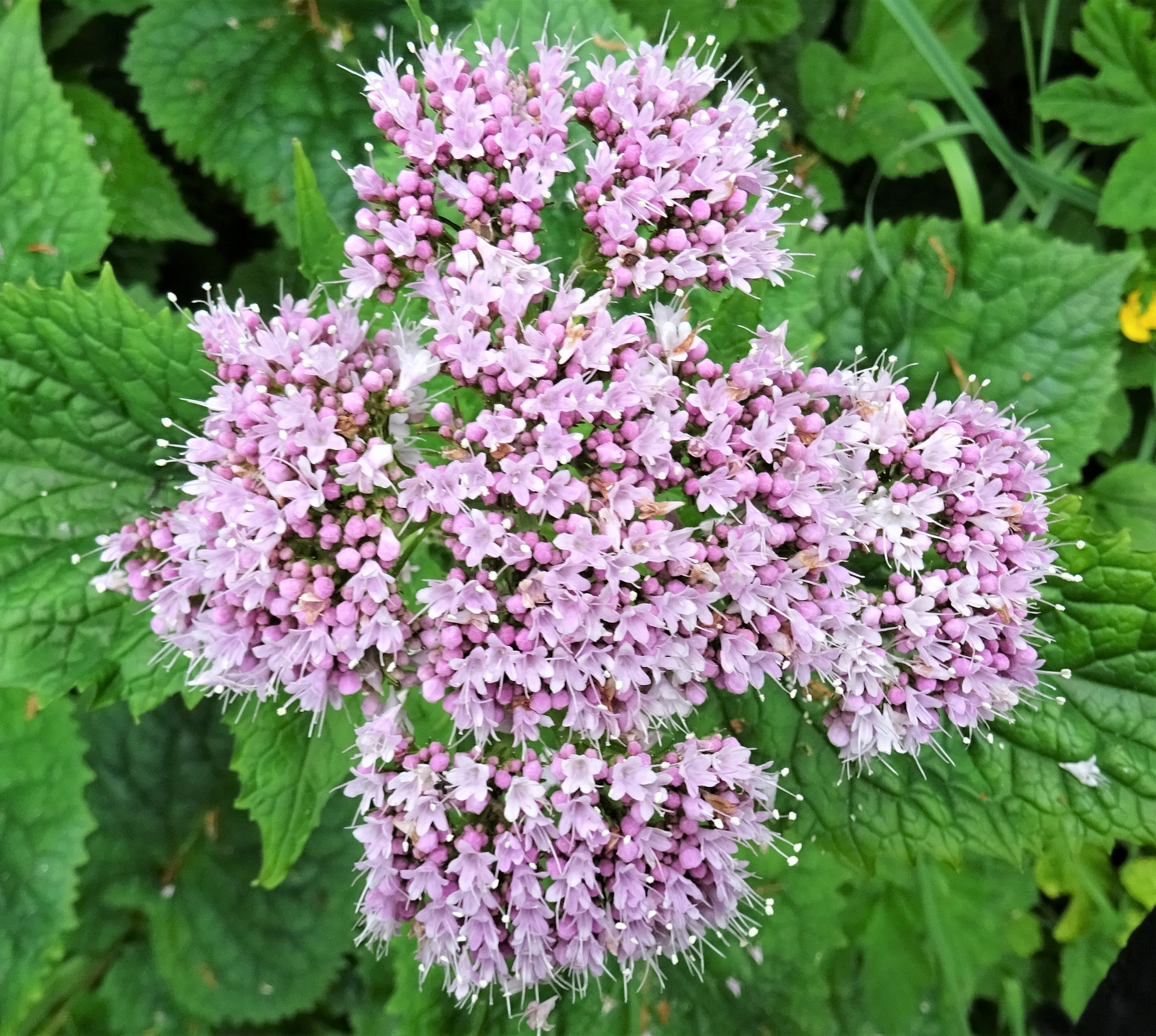
- Flowers
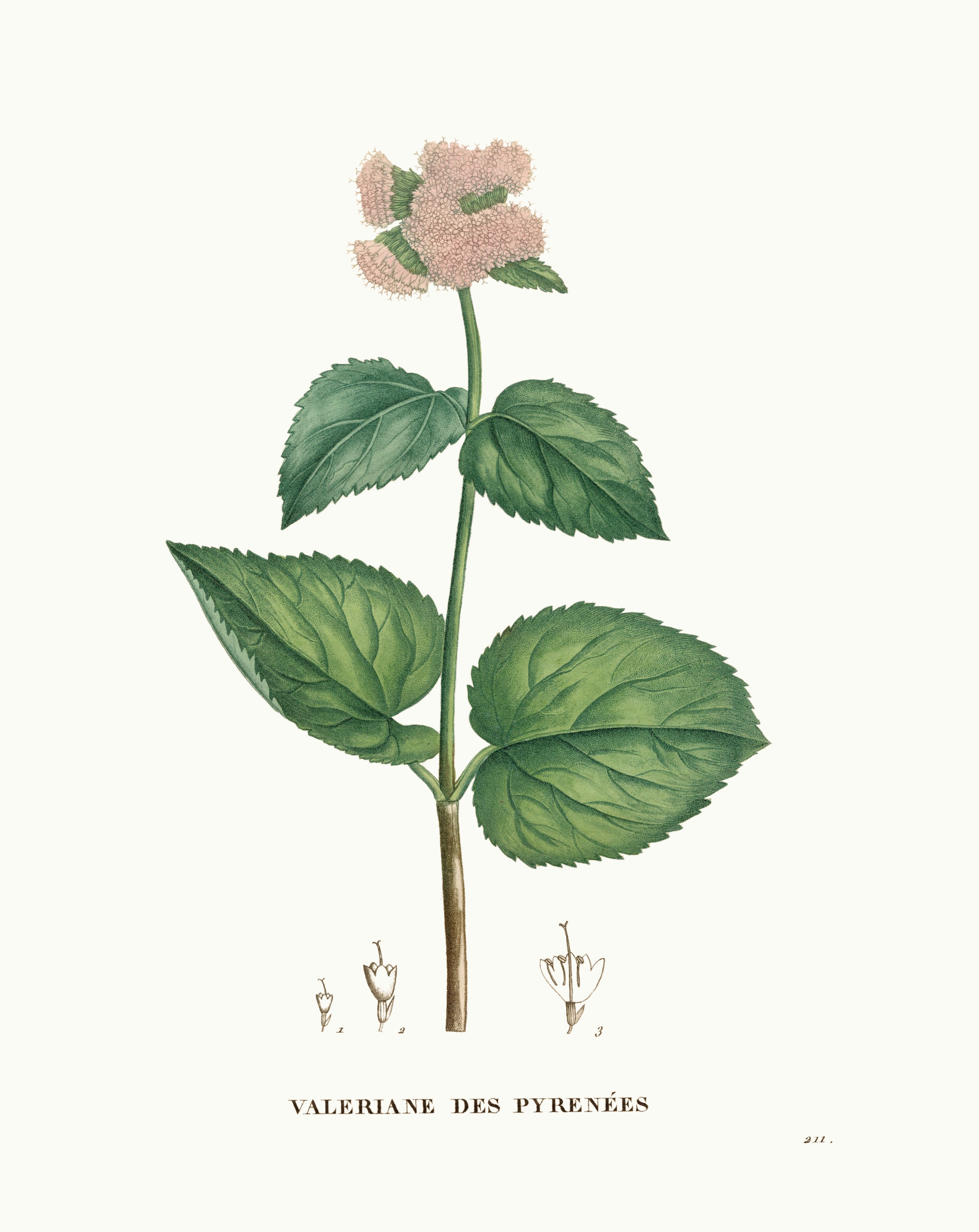
- Botanical illustration

Scientific classification
- Kingdom: Plantae
- Clade: Tracheophytes
- Clade: Angiosperms
- Clade: Eudicots
- Clade: Asterids
- Order: Dipsacales
- Family: Caprifoliaceae
- Genus: Valeriana
- Species: V. pyrenaica

Binomial name
- Valeriana pyrenaica L.

= Valeriana pyrenaica =

Species of plant

Valeriana pyrenaica, the capon's tail grass or Pyrenean valerian, is a species of flowering plant in the family Caprifoliaceae. It is native to Spain and France, and is a garden escapee in Ireland and Great Britain. A perennial herbaceous plant reaching 1.2 m (4 ft), it grows in the Pyrenees and Cantabrian Mountains, typically near water.

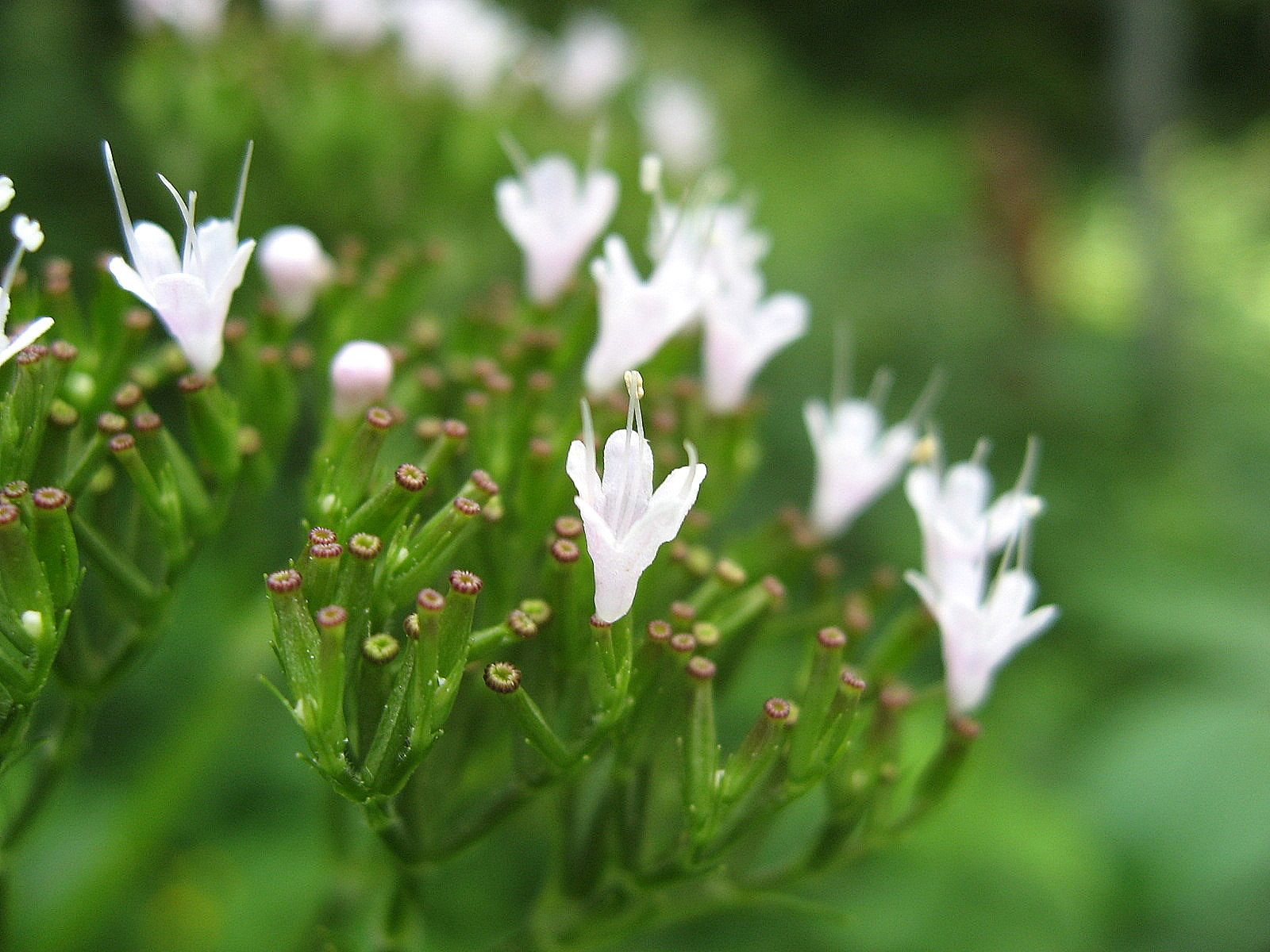
Extreme close-up of flowering structures

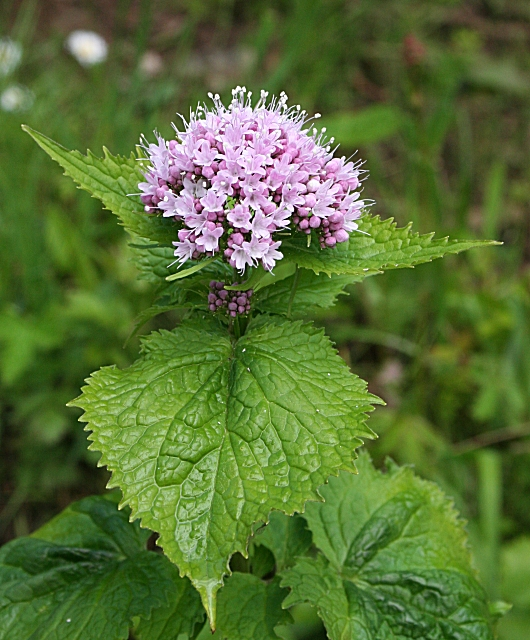
On the Scottish side of the Liddel Water

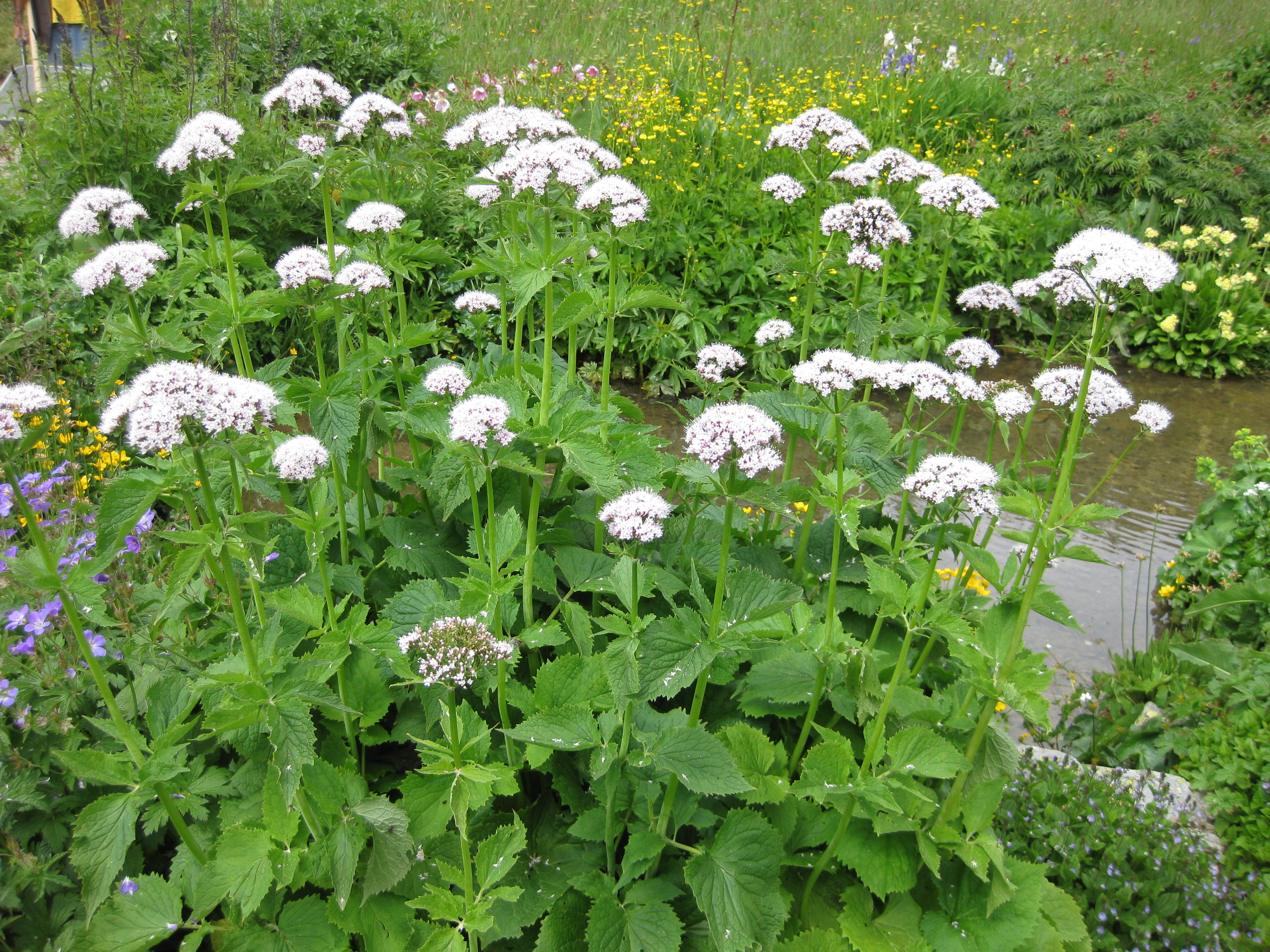
At the Jardin botanique alpin du Lautaret

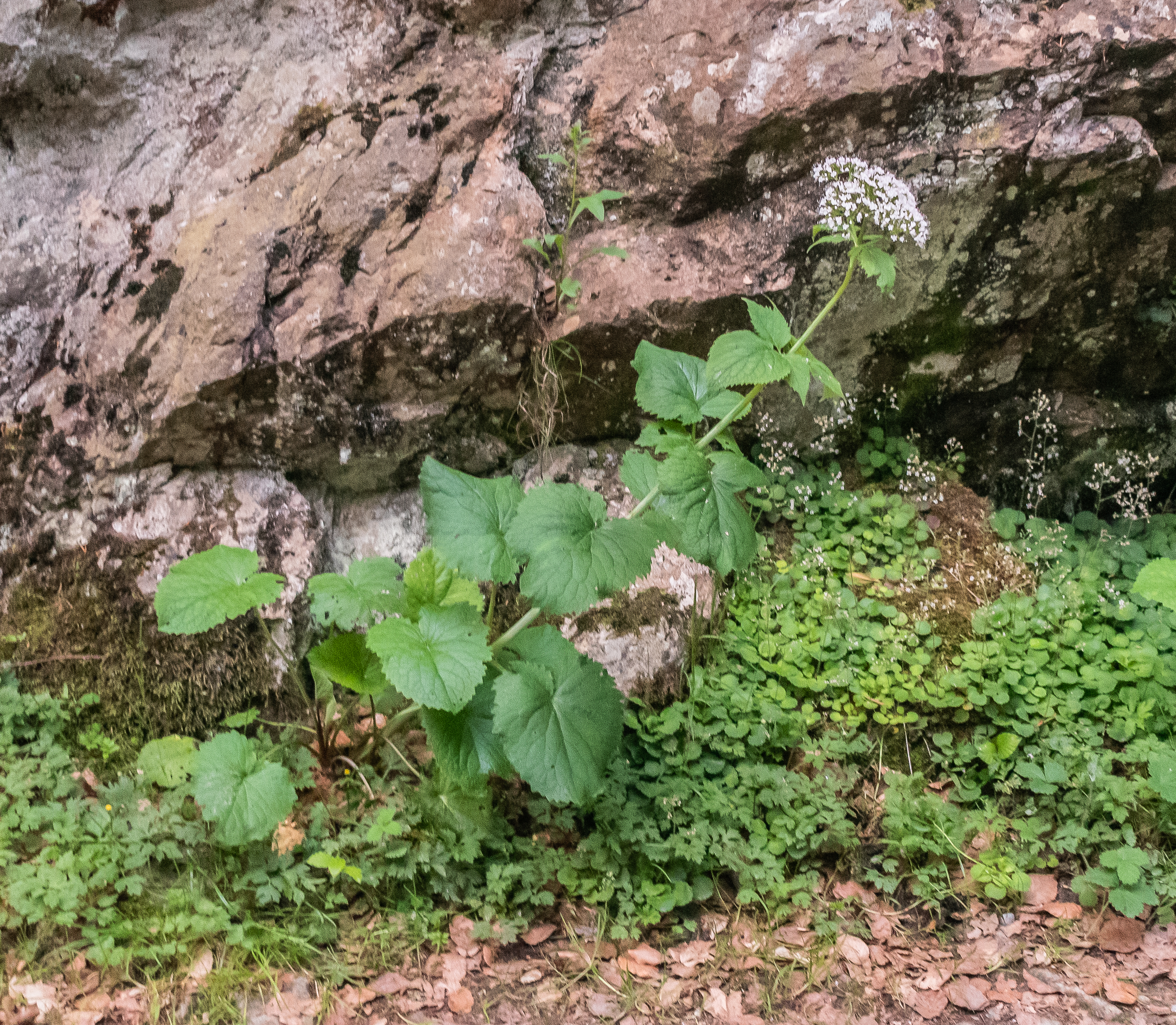
In the wild in the Pyrenees
