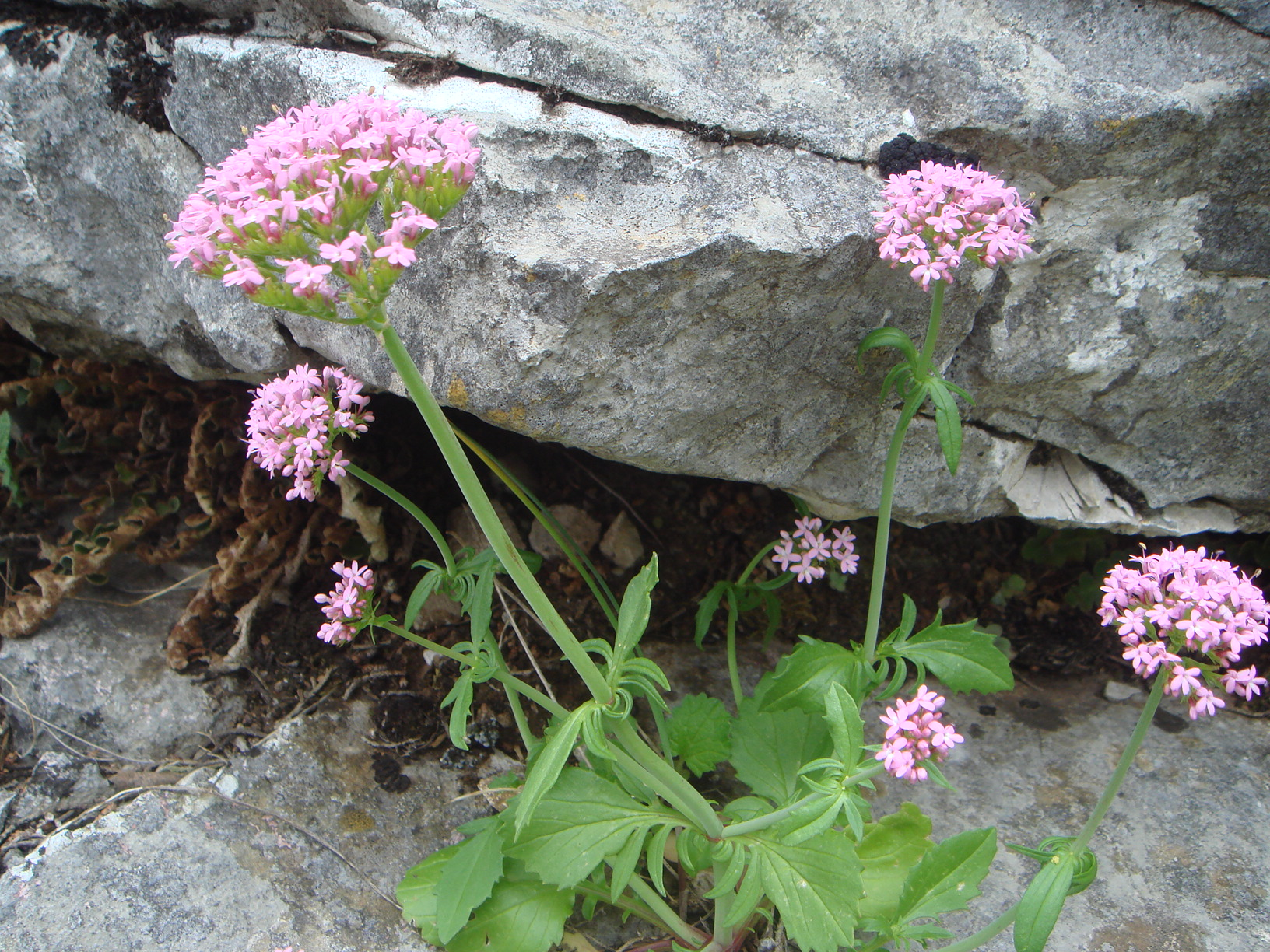

Scientific classification
- Kingdom: Plantae
- Clade: Tracheophytes
- Clade: Angiosperms
- Clade: Eudicots
- Clade: Asterids
- Order: Dipsacales
- Family: Caprifoliaceae
- Genus: Valeriana
- Species: V. calcitrapae

Binomial name
- Valeriana calcitrapae L. (1753)

Synonyms
- Centranthus baeticus Sennen (1936); Centranthus baeticus var. subintegrifolius Sennen (1936); Centranthus calcitrapae (L.) Dufr. (1811); Centranthus clausonis Pomel (1874); Centranthus macrosiphon var. micranthus Willk. (1865); Centranthus pinnatifidus St.-Lag. (1880); Hybidium calcitrapa Fourr. (1868); Ocymastrum calcitrapa Kuntze (1891); Rittera calcitrapae (L.) Raf. (1840); Valeriana annua Gray (1821 publ. 1822); Valeriana laciniata Salisb. (1796), nom. superfl.; Valeriana parviflora Miégev. (1867); Valeriana rotundifolia Sm. (1806), nom. illeg.; Valeriana stevenii Ledeb. (1844)

= Valeriana calcitrapae =

Species of plant

Valeriana calcitrapae is a species of annual herb in the family Caprifoliaceae. Individuals can grow to 18 cm tall. It is native to the Mediterranean Basin, Crimea, and Macaronesia (the Azores, Canary Islands, and Madeira).

== Sources ==
This article incorporates text from a free content work. Licensed under CC0 (license statement/permission). Text taken from Centranthus calcitrapae. Encyclopedia of Life.
