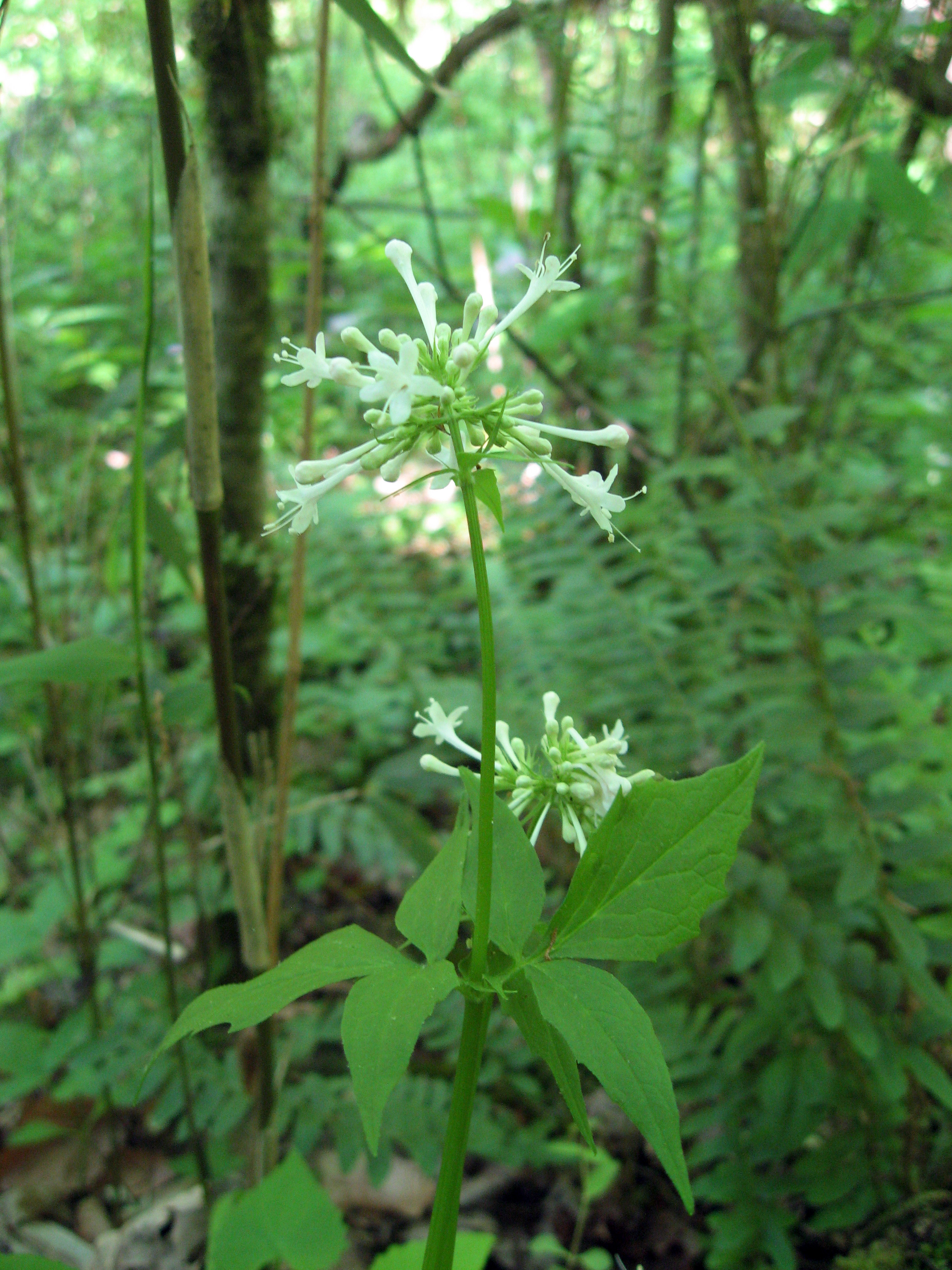

Scientific classification
- Kingdom: Plantae
- Clade: Tracheophytes
- Clade: Angiosperms
- Clade: Eudicots
- Clade: Asterids
- Order: Dipsacales
- Family: Caprifoliaceae
- Genus: Valeriana
- Species: V. pauciflora

Binomial name
- Valeriana pauciflora Michx.

= Valeriana pauciflora =

Species of flowering plant

Valeriana pauciflora, commonly called the largeflower valerian, is a flowering plant species in the family Caprifoliaceae. It is native to the Eastern United States, where it is found in the regions of the Interior Low Plateau, the Ohio River drainage, and the Potomac River Valley. In this region, it is found in very nutrient-rich, mesic forest communities, often in stream valleys or lower slopes.

Valeriana pauciflora is a conservative perennial restricted to high-quality habitat. It produces white through light pink flowers in late spring and early summer. This species can set seeds without insect pollination, and also might be cross-pollinated by butterflies

The specific epithet pauciflora, is Latin for 'few flowered'.
