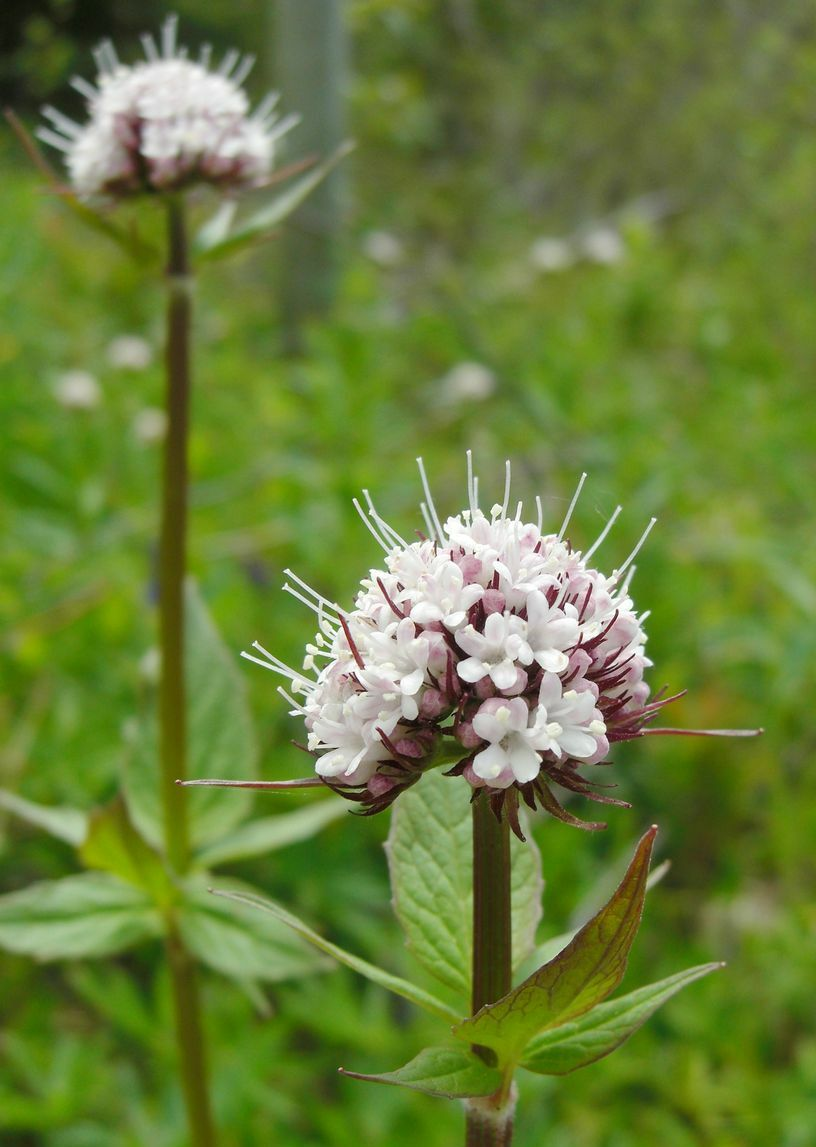
- Valeriana sitchensis in Wells Gray Provincial Park, British Columbia

Scientific classification
- Kingdom: Plantae
- Clade: Tracheophytes
- Clade: Angiosperms
- Clade: Eudicots
- Clade: Asterids
- Order: Dipsacales
- Family: Caprifoliaceae
- Genus: Valeriana
- Species: V. sitchensis

Binomial name
- Valeriana sitchensis Bong.

= Valeriana sitchensis =

Species of flowering plant

Valeriana sitchensis is a species of valerian known by the common name Sitka valerian. It is native to northwestern North America from Alaska and northern Canada to Montana to northern California, where it grows in many types of habitat, including moist mountain forests. In moist subalpine meadows, it is often one of the most common plants. This is a rhizomatous perennial herb producing a stout, erect stem to about 70 centimeters in maximum height, but known to exceed one meter at times. The leaves vary in size and shape, often having deep lobes or being composed of several leaflets. The inflorescence is a cyme of many white or pink-tinged flowers, each under a centimeter wide. The flower has five corolla lobes and three whiskery stamens protruding from the center.

Native Americans cooked and ate the roots, which have a poor scent. Some tribes also pounded the roots to make a poultice.
