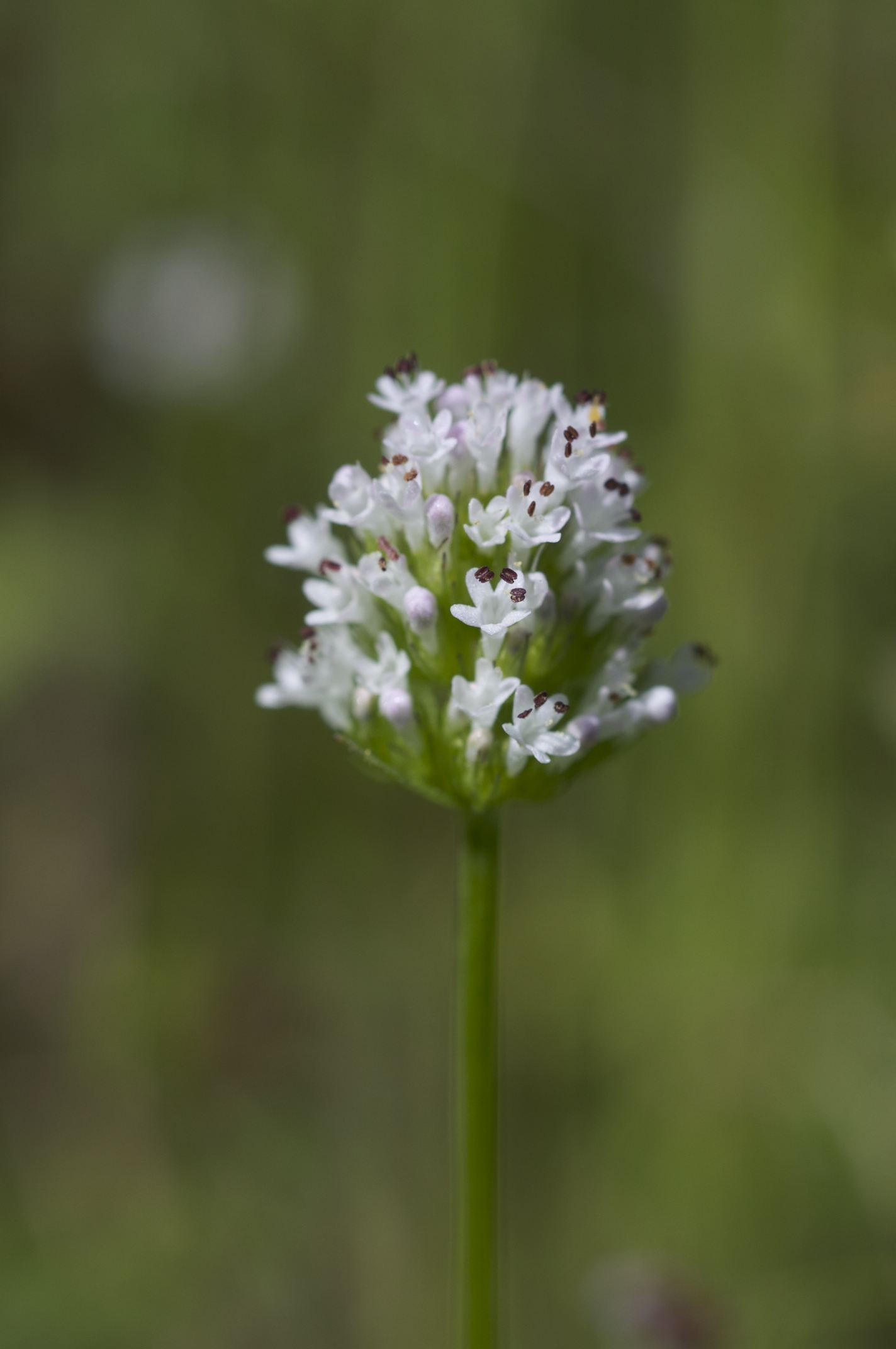

Scientific classification
- Kingdom: Plantae
- Clade: Tracheophytes
- Clade: Angiosperms
- Clade: Eudicots
- Clade: Asterids
- Order: Dipsacales
- Family: Caprifoliaceae
- Genus: Valeriana
- Species: V. macrocera

Binomial name
- Valeriana macrocera (Torr. & A.Gray) Byng & Christenh. (2018)

Synonyms
- List: Aligera collina (A.Heller) Suksd. (1927); Aligera eichleriana Suksd. (1897); Aligera jepsonii Suksd. (1898); Aligera macrocera (Torr. & A.Gray) Suksd. (1897); Aligera macroptera Suksd. (1897); Aligera minor A.Heller (1898); Aligera ostiolatata Suksd. (1897); Plectritis collina A.Heller (1907); Plectritis eichleriana (Suksd.) A.Heller (1907); Plectritis glabra Jeps. (1901); Plectritis jepsonii (Suksd.) Burtt Davy (1901); Plectritis macrocera Torr. & A.Gray (1841); Plectritis macrocera var. collina (A.Heller) Dyal (1949); Plectritis macrocera var. eichleriana (Suksd.) Dempster (1958); Plectritis macroptera (Suksd.) Rydb. (1917); Valeriana aligera Christenh. & Byng (2018); Valeriana jepsonii (Suksd.) Christenh. & Byng (2018); Valeriana macroptera (Suksd.) Byng & Christenh. (2018); Valerianella macrocera (Torr. & A.Gray) A.Gray (1883); Valerianella macroptera (Suksd.) Piper (1906)

= Valeriana macrocera =

Species of flowering plant in the honeysuckle family

Valeriana macrocera is a species of flowering plant in the honeysuckle family known by the common names longhorn seablush and white plectritis. It is native to California and Nevada in the western United States, where it is a common plant in mountains, valleys, open steppe, and coastal habitat types. It is an annual herb growing erect to a maximum height of 60–80 centimeters (24–31 in). The widely spaced, paired and oppositely arranged leaves are oval or somewhat oblong, smooth-edged, and up to 4.5 centimeters (1.8 in) long by 2 centimeters (0.79 in) wide. The upper ones lack petioles. The inflorescence is a dense, cylindrical, headlike cluster of flowers in shades of pale pink to white. The corolla is under a centimeter long and is divided into five lobes and a short, blunt spur.
