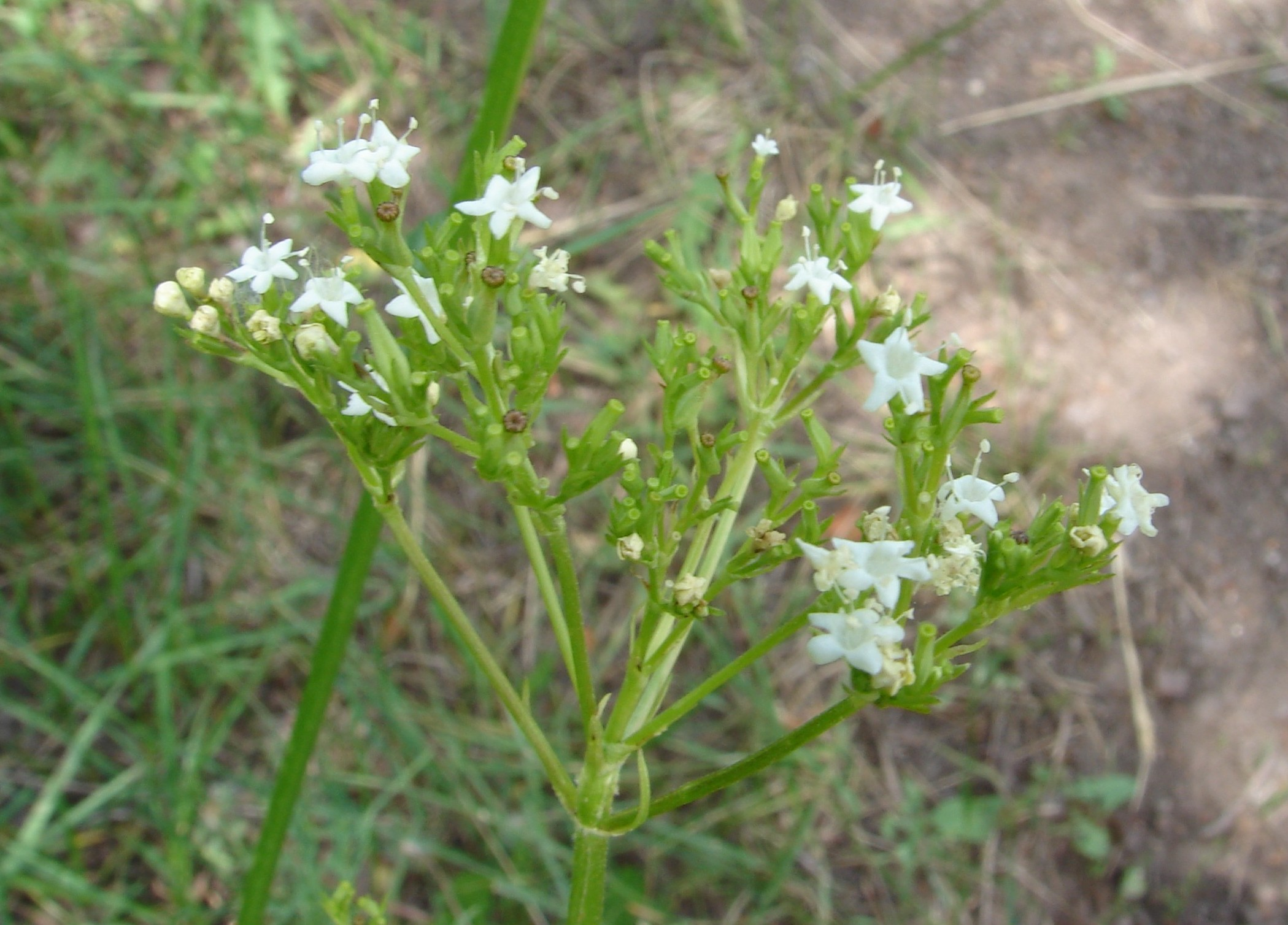

Conservation status
- Secure (NatureServe)

Scientific classification
- Kingdom: Plantae
- Clade: Tracheophytes
- Clade: Angiosperms
- Clade: Eudicots
- Clade: Asterids
- Order: Dipsacales
- Family: Caprifoliaceae
- Genus: Valeriana
- Species: V. occidentalis

Binomial name
- Valeriana occidentalis A.Heller

= Valeriana occidentalis =

Species of flowering plant

Valeriana occidentalis is a species of flowering plant in the honeysuckle family known by the common name western valerian. It is native to the western United States, particularly the northwestern quadrant, but it occurs as far south as Arizona and as far east as Colorado and South Dakota. It occurs in moist, forested mountain habitat. It is an erect herb growing 30 to 75 centimeters tall with whorls or opposite pairs of leaves at intervals along stem. The leaves are generally divided into lobes or are compound, with each leaf made up of a few oval-shaped leaflets. The inflorescence is a dense cyme of many funnel-shaped white flowers each 3 or 4 millimeters long with three long, protruding stamens. The fruit is a ribbed achene about half a centimeter long which may be tipped with the featherlike remains of the flower sepals.

== Distribution ==
Valeriana occidentalis is found in the US in the following states: AZ, CA, CO, ID, MT, NV, OR, SD, UT, WA, WY. It is also found in British Columbia, Canada. A map of its distribution can be found on the USDA Plants Site.
