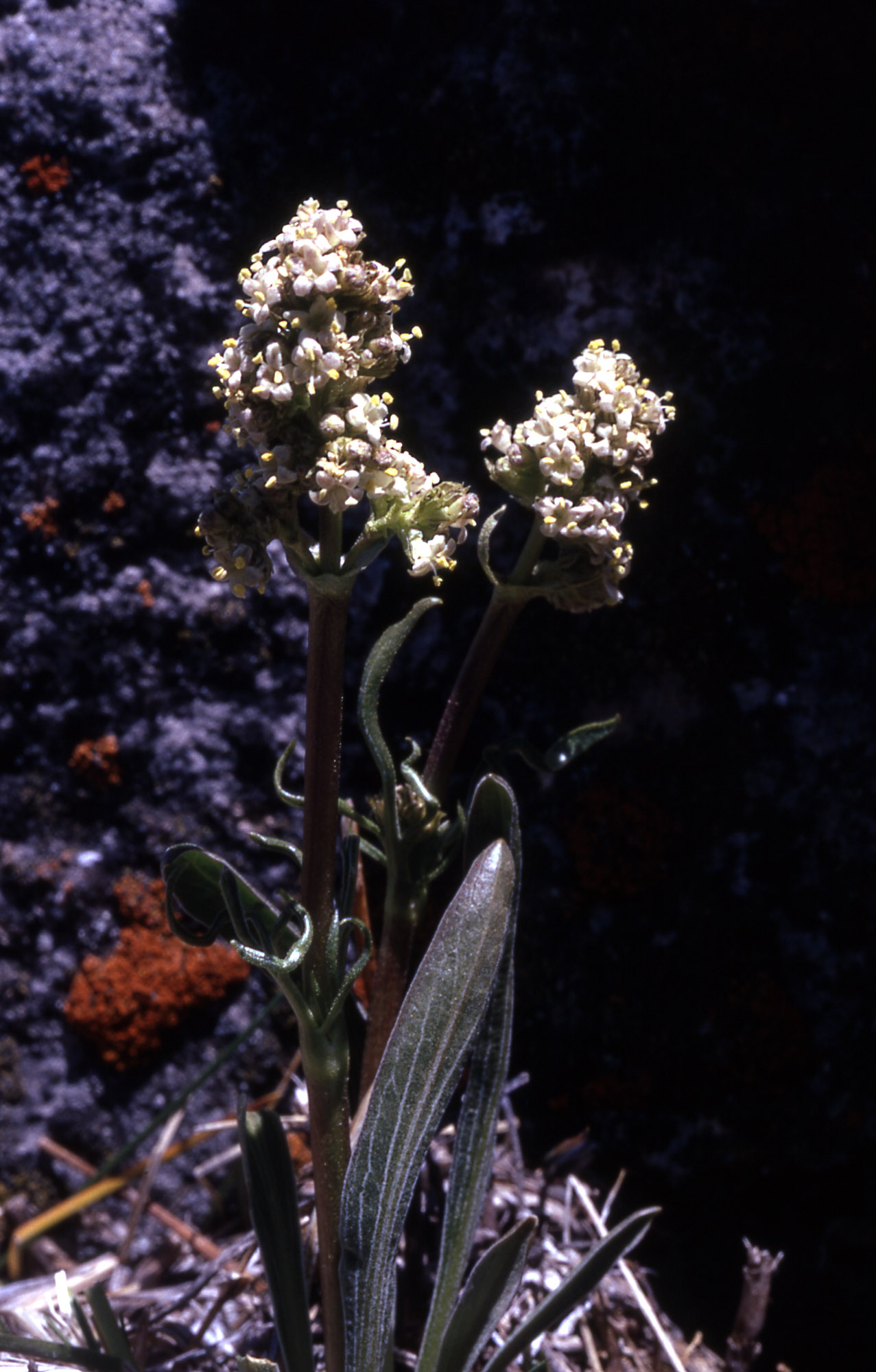

Conservation status
- Secure (NatureServe)

Scientific classification
- Kingdom: Plantae
- Clade: Tracheophytes
- Clade: Angiosperms
- Clade: Eudicots
- Clade: Asterids
- Order: Dipsacales
- Family: Caprifoliaceae
- Genus: Valeriana
- Species: V. edulis

Binomial name
- Valeriana edulis Nutt.

Subspecies and varieties
- V. e. var. ciliata; V. e. subsp. edulis; V. e. subsp. procera

= Valeriana edulis =

Edible valerian

Plant species in the honeysuckle family

Valeriana edulis, commonly known as edible valerian or tobacco root, is a species of flowering plant native to North America in the honeysuckle family.

Despite the common name, "tobacco root", edible valerian is not closely related to tobacco.

== Description ==
Edible valerian is a long-lived herbaceous plant. It has a long, often forked, cone shaped taproot that can be 0.8 to 3 centimeters thick. The exterior of the root is black, but its inside is bright yellow. Atop the root it has a short, branched caudex covered by deep brown to almost black bases of leaves from prior years.

The stems will have two to six leaf pairs, but most of a plant's leaves are basal. The leaves are occasionally as short as 6 centimeters (2.5 in), but more often are 10 to 40 cm (4–15.5 in). Their width is typically 0.3–4.2 cm with rare instances of reaching 6.5 cm.

Inflorescences are born on one to four elongated, sparsely leaved stems usually around 0.5–1.5 meters tall. Flowers are small (0.5 mm diameter for pistillate flowers, 2.5–3.5 mm diameter for stamenate flowers) and cream or white. In the US and Canada blooming can be as early as June or as late as August. In Mexico subspecies procera blooms and goes to seed in August and October.

== Taxonomy ==
Valeriana edulis was given its scientific name and described by Thomas Nuttall in 1841. It is classified as part of the genus Valeriana and together with it is part of the family Caprifoliaceae. Edible valerian and its close relatives in the Edulis clade of Valeriana is most closely related to the Central American clade. Its likely closest relative is Valeriana texana or Valeriana prionophylla, if V. procera is not considered a valid species.

According to Plants of the World Online it is subdivided into two subspecies and one variety.

- Valeriana edulis var. ciliata

This variety was given its first valid description by Frank Nicholas Meyer in 1951 as a subspecies. In 1963 the botanist Arthur Cronquist reduced it to a variety. It was previously described using the species name Valeriana ciliata in 1841 that had already been used making it an illegitimate name. It grows in southeastern Canada, the north central and northeastern US.

- Valeriana edulis subsp. edulis

The autonymic subspecies grows British Columbia to southwestern Mexico.

- Valeriana edulis subsp. procera

This subspecies was first described as a species Valeriana procera in 1819 by Karl Sigismund Kunth. It was classified as a subspecies of V. edulis in 1951 by Frank Nicholas Meyer. It grows in every states of central Mexico as well as parts of northeastern and southwestern Mexico. In the southwest it grows in three states, Jalisco, Michoacán, and Oaxaca. It is more widespread in the northeast, being found in Aguascalientes, Chihuahua, Durango, Hidalgo, Michoacán, and San Luis Potosí.

Valeriana edulis has 13 synonyms of its two subspecies and one variety.

Table of Synonyms
Name	Year	Rank	Synonym of:	Notes
Patrinia ceratophylla Hook.	1833	species	subsp. edulis	= het.
Patrinia longifolia J.McNab	1835	species	subsp. edulis	= het.
Phyllactis obovata Nutt.	1818	species	subsp. edulis	= het.
Valeriana ceratophylla MacMill.	1892	species	subsp. edulis	= het., pro syn.
Valeriana ciliata Torr. & A.Gray	1841	species	var. ciliata	≡ hom., nom. illeg.
Valeriana edulis subsp. ciliata F.G.Mey.	1951	subspecies	var. ciliata	≡ hom.
Valeriana edulis f. glabra H.St.John	1937	form	subsp. edulis	= het.
Valeriana furfurescens A.Nelson	1901	species	subsp. edulis	= het.
Valeriana knautioides Graebn.	1899	species	subsp. procera	= het.
Valeriana lesueurii Standl.	1940	species	subsp. edulis	= het.
Valeriana obovata Schult.	1822	species	subsp. edulis	= het.
Valeriana procera Kunth	1819	species	subsp. procera	≡ hom.
Valeriana trachycarpa Rydb.	1904	species	subsp. edulis	= het.
Notes: ≡ homotypic synonym; = heterotypic synonym

=== Names ===
The species name, edulis, is Botanical Latin meaning 'edible'. Related to its classification it is known by the common names edible valerian, taprooted valerian, western valerian, and tall valerian. It is also known as tobacco-root, edible tobacco-root, and Oregon-tobacco. The Tobacco Root Mountains in southwestern Montana are named after this species.

== Range and habitat ==
The native range of edible valarian is separated into two populations in North America. An eastern population that grows in the Midwestern United States in southeastern Minnesota, Iowa, southern Wisconsin, northern Illinois, northwest Indiana, Ohio, and southern Michigan. This also extends across the international border into southwestern Ontario. This eastern population is classified as variety ciliata and grows in swamps and bogs largely in areas that were glaciated though also in the Driftless Area in southwestern Wisconsin.

The western population's northernmost extent is in southern British Columbia. In the United States it is found in eastern Washington and Oregon, through much of Idaho, and western Montana. In South Dakota it is only recorded in three western counties, but it is widespread in Wyoming and the western, mountainous counties of Colorado. It is also widespread in Utah and Nevada, but is not found in California. It is native to both Arizona and New Mexico.

To the north it is all subspecies edulis, but the range overlaps in areas of Mexico with subspecies procera. In the northwest it only grows in Sonora. In the northeast it is known from Chihuahua, Coahuila, Durango, San Luis Potosí, Hidalgo, and Aguascalientes and is also in the state of Veracruz on the gulf. It is recorded in all the central Mexican states including Mexico City, the State of Mexico, Morelos, Puebla, and Tlaxcala. In the southwest it found in every state including Nayarit, Jalisco, Colima, Michoacán, and Oaxaca, but is absent from Guerrero. It does not extend into southeastern Mexico.

Edible valerian typically grows in moist montane meadows and subalpine parks. In the Intermountain West it grows at elevations as low 1,400 meters (4,600 ft); in Utah it grows as high as 3,700 meters (12,100 ft).

== Ecology ==
The small, shallow flowers of edible valerian make its pollen and nectar resources available to a wide range of small, generalist pollinators. In Colorado, solitary bees, flies, and moths are the most frequent floral visitors. Growth data indicate that individual plants may live up to 300 years.

=== Conservation status ===
The conservation organization NatureServe evaluated edible valarian in 1987 and found the species to be secure (G5) at the global level. The subspecies V. e. ciliata was listed as Endangered in Canada in 2018. Population extinctions in Ontario were primarily caused by wetland habitat degradation and loss to urban development and agriculture. Competition from invasive reed canary grass may be responsible for declining abundance at the largest extant population. In the United States, V. e. ciliata is not federally protected, but is considered a vulnerable variety (T3) by NatureServe when evaluated in 2000. At the state-level, it is listed as critically imperiled (S1) in Indiana, and Ohio, though the state of Ohio lists it as an endangered species as Valeriana ciliata. It is state threatened in Minnesota, and Michigan, and as a species of Special Concern in Wisconsin and Iowa. It is not listed only in Illinois.

== Uses ==
Edible valerian has long been used as food. One of the earliest written accounts is from the journal of explorer John Charles Frémont in the 1840s:

I ate here, for the first time, the kooyah, or tobacco root, (Valeriana edulis) the principal edible root among the Indians who inhabit the upper waters of the streams on the western side of the mountains. It has a very strong and remarkably peculiar taste and odor, which I can compare to no other vegetable that I am acquainted with, and which to some persons is extremely offensive. It was characterized by Mr. Preuss as the most horrid food he had ever put in his mouth; and when, in the evening, one of the chiefs sent his wife to me with a portion which she had prepared as a delicacy to regale us, the odor immediately drove him out of the lodge; and frequently afterwards he used to beg that when those who liked it had taken what they desired, it might be sent away. To others, however, the taste is rather an agreeable one, and I was afterwards always glad when it formed an addition to our scanty meals. It is full of nutriment; and in its unprepared state is said by the Indians to have very strong poisonous qualities, of which it is deprived by a peculiar process, being baked in the ground for about two days.

The botanist Harold Harrington and fellow researchers experimented with many methods of cooking the roots, including boiling them for varying periods of time with many changes of water, baking them in aluminum foil, and soaking them with sodium bicarbonate, but came to agree with Charles Preuss on the offensive taste. They described the flavor to be like chewing tobacco with a smell like unwashed feet. However, they did observe that spring is the best time for gathering the roots as they are less fibrous than in the fall and with less insect damage.

The botanist David Douglas observed native peoples cooking the roots on his journeys through northwestern America. He recorded, "The roots during the spring months, are collected by the Indians, baked on heated stones, and used as an article of winter or spring food. From a bitter and seemingly pernicious substance, it is thus converted into a soft and pulpy mass, which has a sweet taste, resembling that of treacle, and is apparently not unwholesome."
