= Valeriana rubra =

Scientific classification
- Kingdom: Plantae
- Clade: Tracheophytes
- Clade: Angiosperms
- Clade: Eudicots
- Clade: Asterids
- Order: Dipsacales
- Family: Caprifoliaceae
- Genus: Valeriana
- Species: V. rubra

Binomial name
- Valeriana rubra L

Synonyms
- List: Centranthus latifolius Dufr. (1811); Centranthus marinus Gray (1821 publ. 1822); Centranthus maritimus DC. (1830); Centranthus ruber L. DC. (1805); Centranthus ruber f. albiflorus Merino (1904), nom. nud.; Ocymastrum rubrum Kuntze (1891); Valeriana alba Mazziari (1834); Valeriana florida Salisb. (1796), nom. superfl.; Valeriana hortensis Garsault (1764), opus utique rej.

Species of flowering plant in the honeysuckle family

Valeriana rubra (synonym Centranthus ruber), the red valerian, spur valerian, kiss-me-quick, fox's brush, devil's beard or Jupiter's beard, is a popular garden plant grown for its ornamental flowers. It is not to be confused with the closely related Valeriana officinalis (the garden valerian).

== Description ==
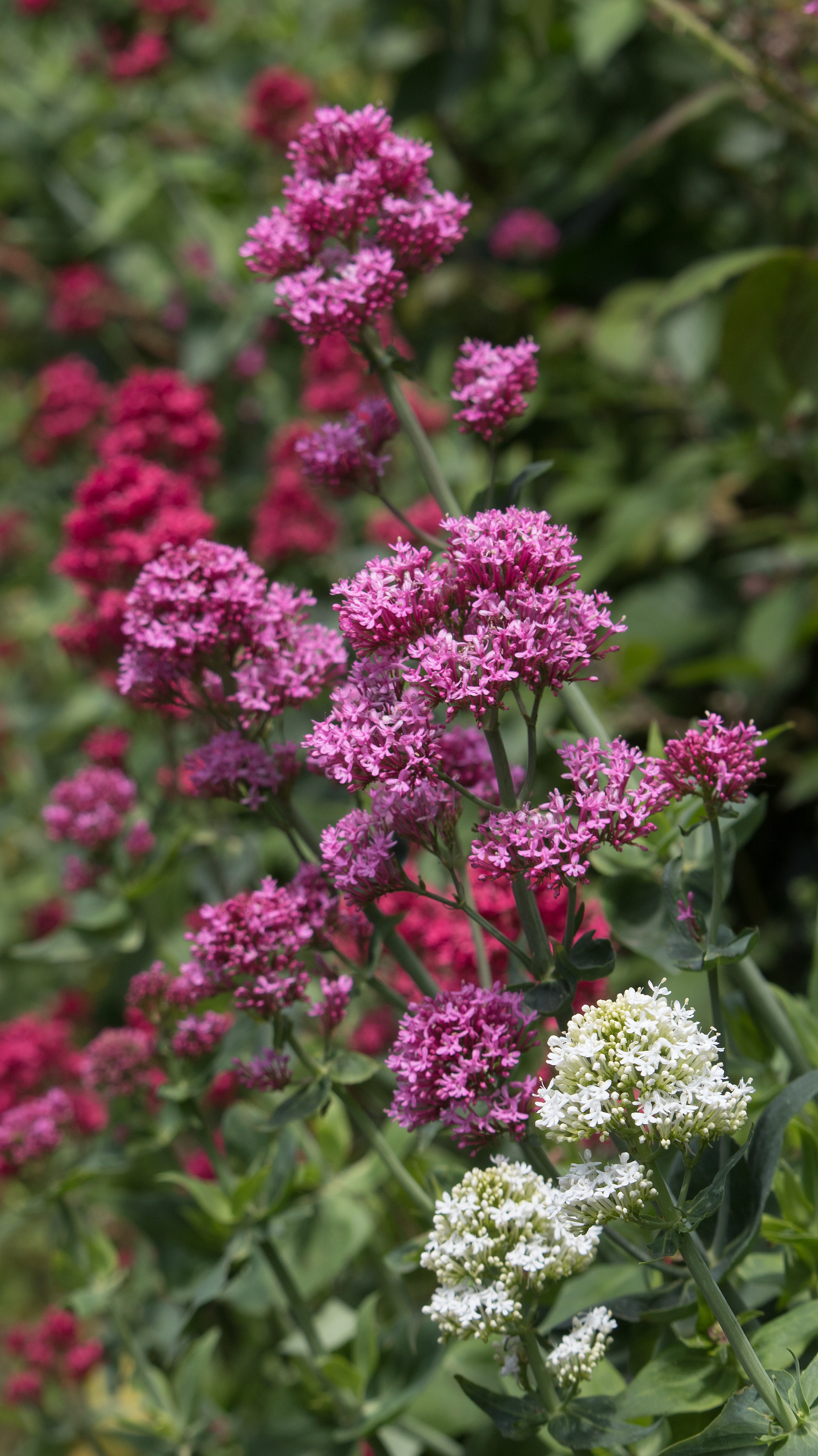
Three common colour forms

Valeriana rubra is a multi-stemmed perennial herbaceous plant up to 80 cm (31 in) tall with red, pink or white flowers. The leaves are generally 5–10 cm (2.0–3.9 in) long, the stem leaves being sessile and branch leaves sometimes having a petiole up to 5 cm long. The leaves grow in opposite pairs and are oval or lanceolate in shape.

The inflorescences occur at the tips of the branches, in multiparous cymes with a hundred or more flowers. Each plant has either red, pink or white flowers. Valeriana rubra 'Albus' (about 10% of individuals) has white blooms. The cultivar 'coccineus' is especially long-blooming. The blooms have a strong and somewhat rank scent.

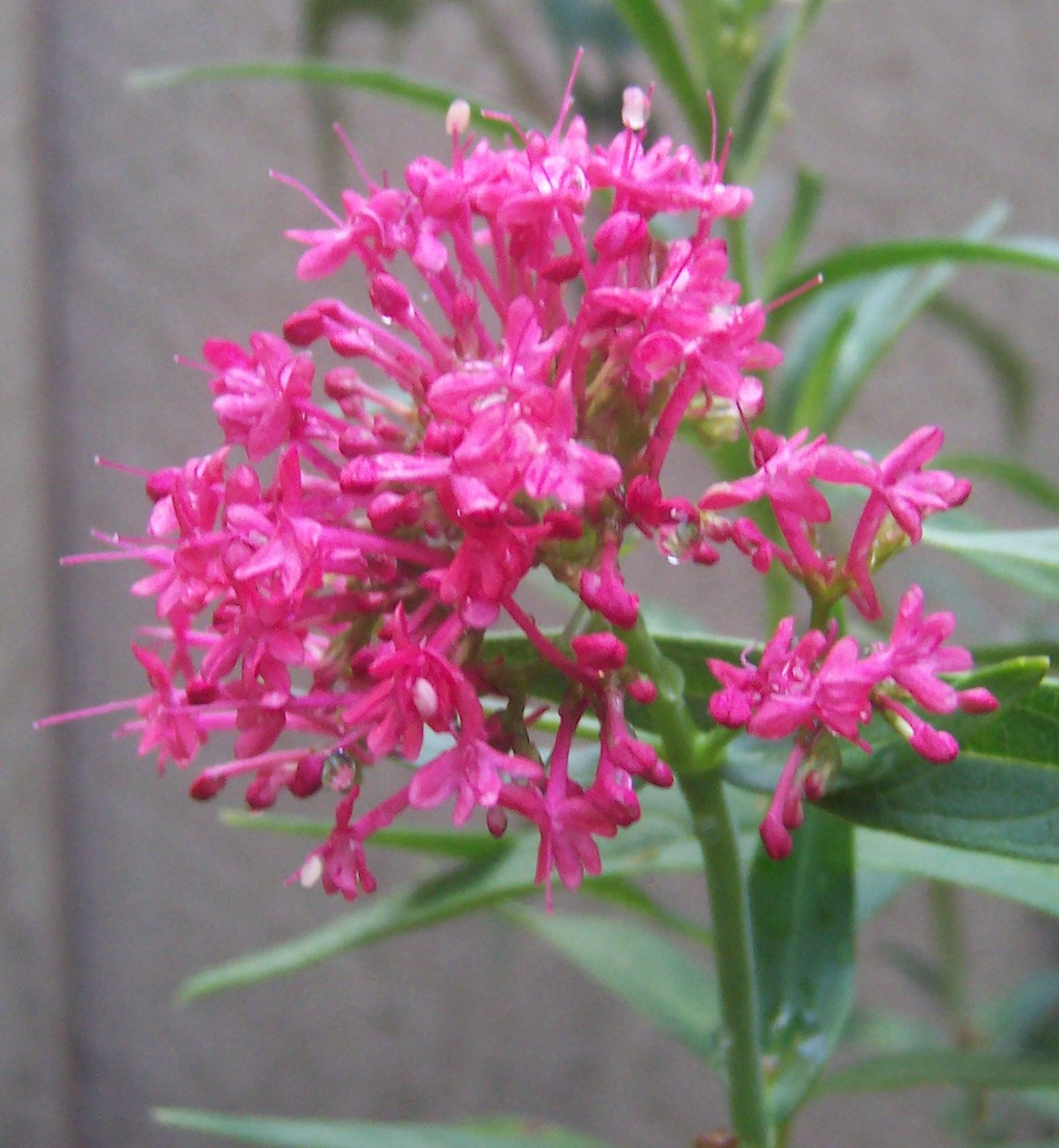
Closeup of inflorescence

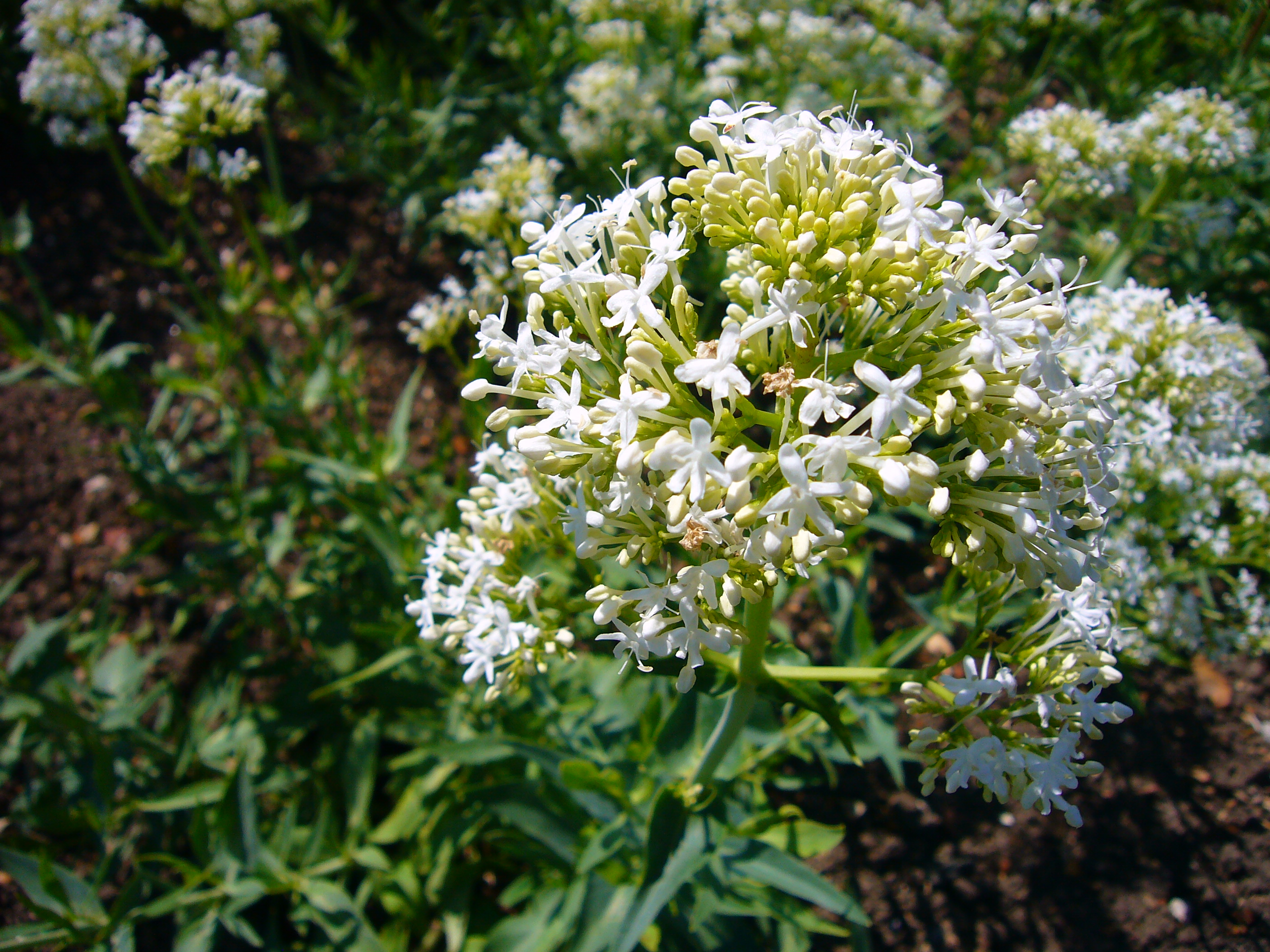
White form

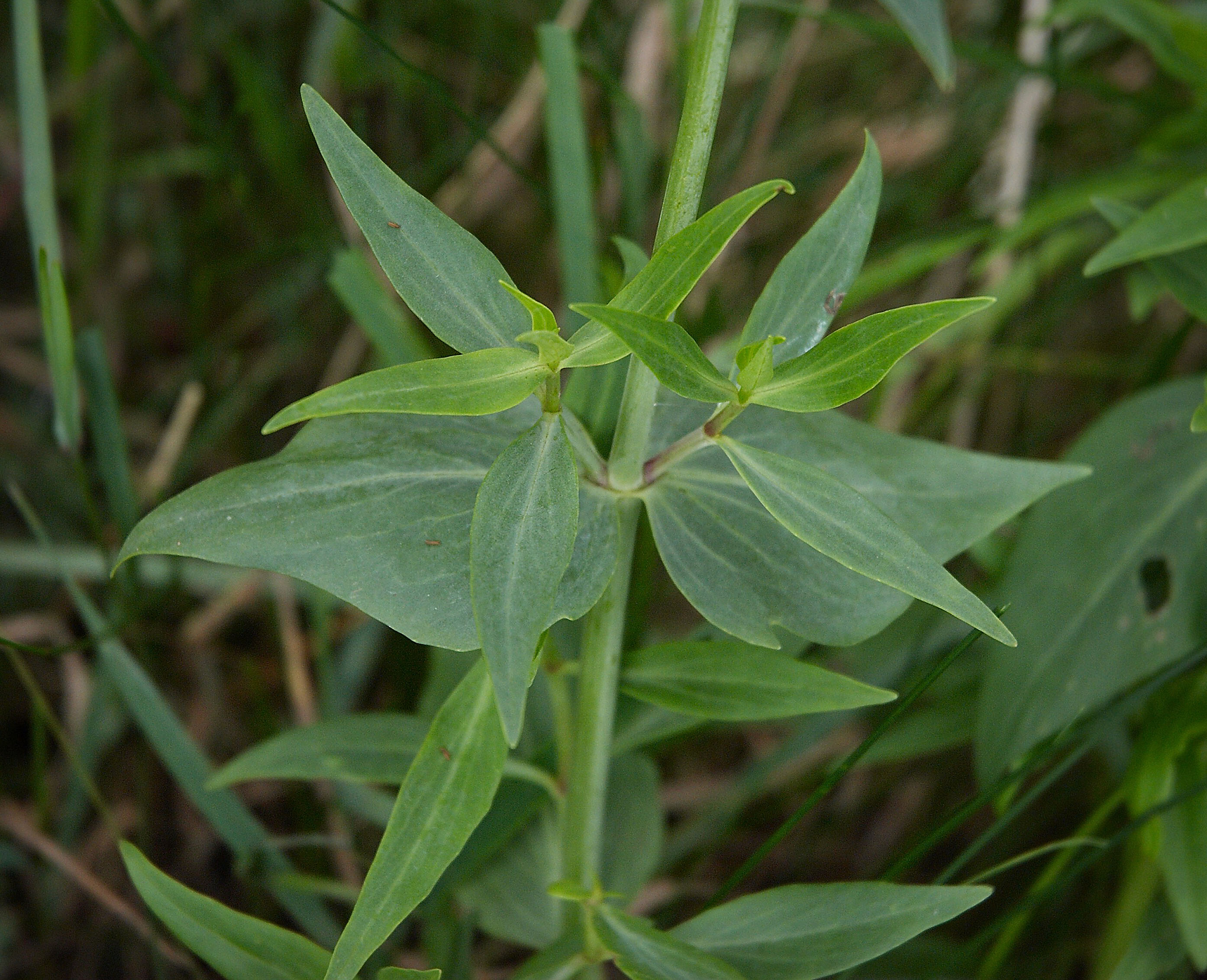
Showing both petioled and sessile leaf forms

== Ecology ==
They are pollinated by both bees and butterflies and the plant is noted for attracting insects. Flowering takes place in early summer and, in cool summer areas, continues sporadically throughout the summer and into fall. Red Valerian is used as a food plant by the larvae of some Lepidoptera species including angle shades. Fruits have feathery projections similar in appearance to the pappus of dandelion seeds that allow wind dispersal, and can self-seed freely and become invasive if not properly controlled.

== Taxonomy ==
Valeriana rubra was the original scientific name given to the species by Linnaeus in 1753. It means 'red valerian'. It was moved into a new genus, Centranthus, in 1805, but returned again to Valeriana by 2019. It is currently recognised by this name in the key international Plants of the World Online database and the World Flora Online Plantlist. However, the name Centranthus ruber is still a familiar gardeners' term for it, such as at the Royal Horticultural Society. As V. rubra is not a native of the UK and the native is Valeriana officinalis, the species commonly spoken of in folk medicine, V. rubra is often spoken of as "not real Valerian" in gardening circles in the UK.

== Distribution ==
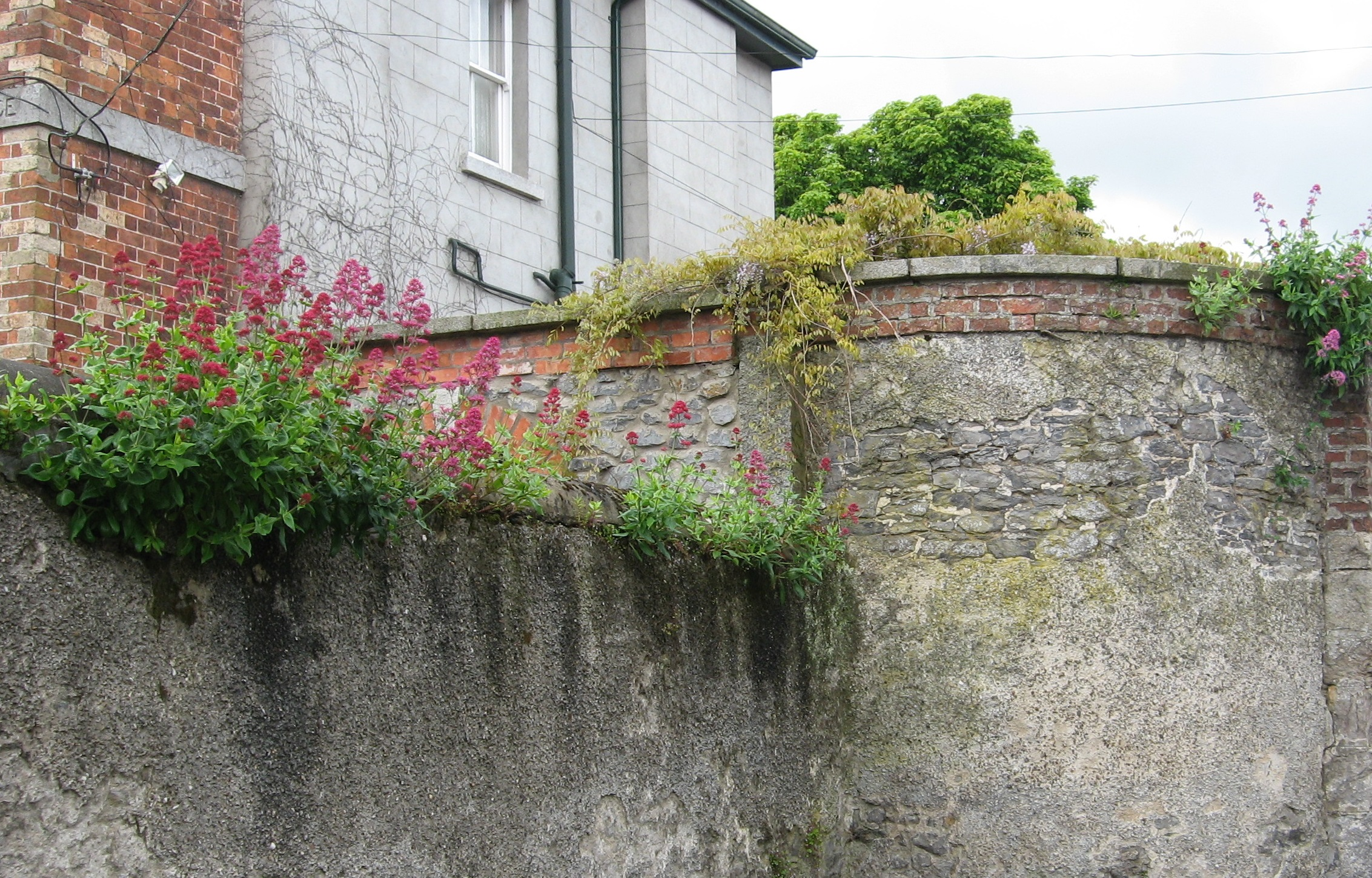
Growing atop old walls in Ireland

Valeriana rubra is native of the Mediterranean region, ranging from Portugal and Spain to France, Italy, former Yugoslavia, Albania, Greece and European Turkey, and from Morocco to Algeria and Tunisia. It has been introduced into many other parts of the world as a garden escape. It is naturalised in France, Australia, Great Britain, Ireland, Isle of Man and the United States. In the US it can be found growing wild in such western states as Arizona, Utah, California, Hawaii, Washington, and Oregon, usually in disturbed, rocky places at elevations below 200 m. It is often seen by roadsides or in urban wasteland. It can tolerate very alkaline soil conditions. Because of its ability to tolerate alkaline conditions, Valeriana rubra can tolerate lime in mortar, and may frequently be seen growing on old walls in Italy, southern France and south-west UK.

== Invasive species ==
The species is listed as a NEMBA 1b invasive in the Western Cape, South Africa. It may not be owned, imported, grown, moved, sold, given as a gift or dumped in a waterway. It requires compulsory control as part of an invasive species control programme to remove and destroy. The plants are deemed to have such a high invasive potential that infestations can qualify to be placed under a government sponsored invasive species management programme. No permits will be issued.
