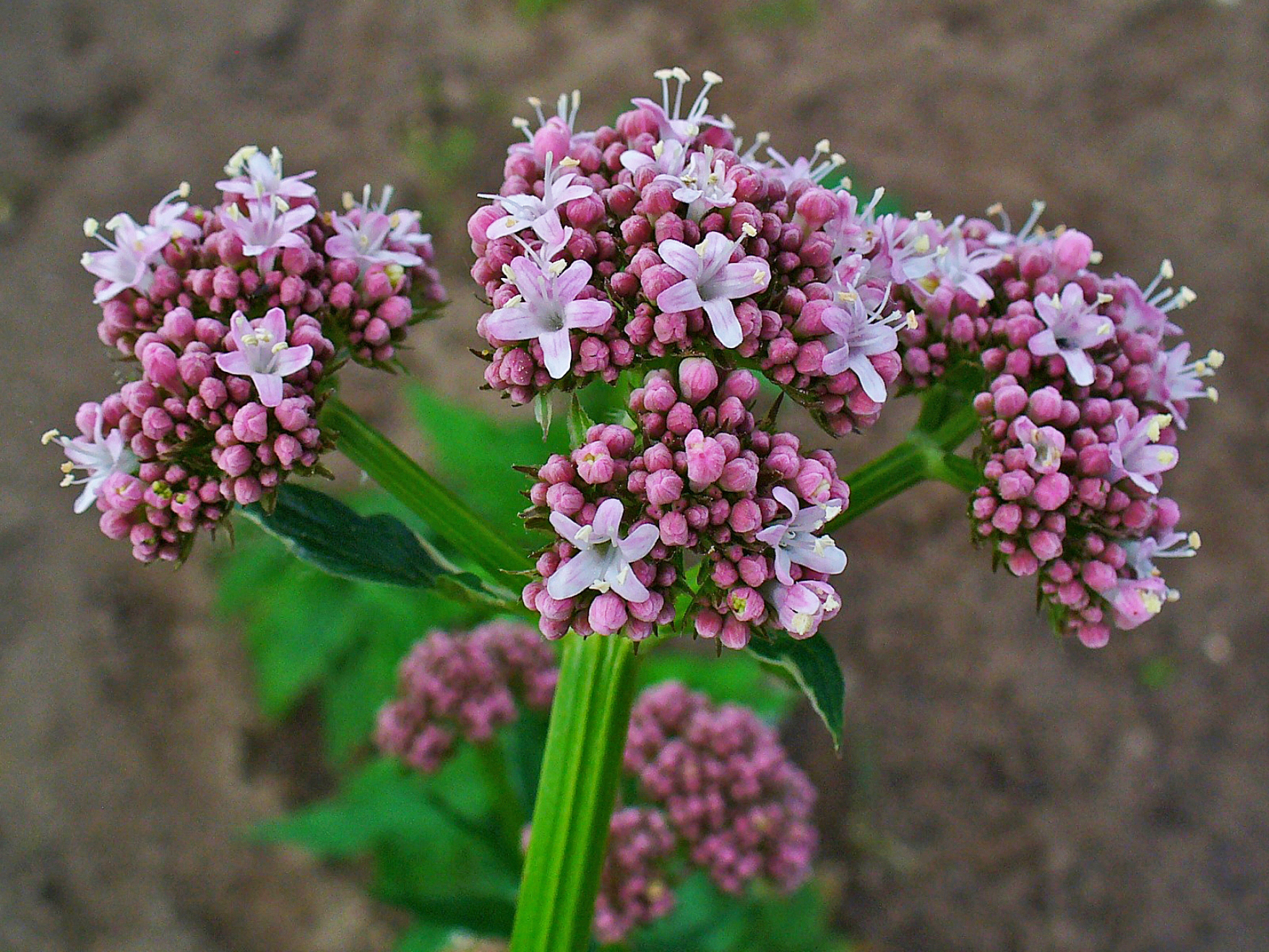
- Garden valerian, Valeriana officinalis

Scientific classification
- Kingdom: Plantae
- Clade: Tracheophytes
- Clade: Angiosperms
- Clade: Eudicots
- Clade: Asterids
- Order: Dipsacales
- Family: Caprifoliaceae
- Subfamily: Valerianoideae
- Genus: Valeriana; L., 1753

Synonyms
- List: Aligera Suksd. (1897); Amblyorhinum Turcz. (1852); Aretiastrum (DC.) Spach (1841); Astrephia Dufr. (1811); Belonanthus Graebn. (1906); Betckea DC. (1832); Centranthus DC. (1805); Dufresnia DC. (1834); Fedia Gaertn. (1790), nom. cons.; Fedia Kunth (1819), nom. illeg.; Fuisa Raf. (1840); Hemesotria Raf. (1820); Hybidium Fourr. (1868); Locusta Riv. ex Medik. (1789); Masema Dulac (1867); Mitrophora Neck. ex Raf. (1813); Monastes Raf. (1840); Ocymastrum Kuntze (1891); Odontocarpa Raf. (1840); Oligacoce Willd. ex DC. (1830); Phu Ludw. (1757); Phuodendron (Graebn.) Dalla Torre & Harms (1905); Phyllactis Pers. (1805); Plectritis DC. (1830); Polypremum Adans. (1763), nom. illeg.; Porteria Hook. (1851); Pseudobetckea (Höck) Lincz. (1958); Rittera Raf. (1840), nom. illeg.; Saliunca Raf. (1840); Siphonella Small (1903); Stangea Graebn. (1906); Valerianopsis C.A.Müll. (1885)

= Valeriana =

Genus of flowering plants in the honeysuckle family

Valeriana is a genus of flowering plants in the family Caprifoliaceae, members of which may be commonly known as valerians. It contains many species, including the garden valerian, Valeriana officinalis. Valeriana has centers of diversity in Eurasia and South America (especially in the Andes), and is represented by native species on all continents except Antarctica.

Some species have been introduced to parts of the world outside their native range, including Valeriana rubra in the western United States and Valeriana macrosiphon in Western Australia.

== Taxonomy ==
The genus was named by Carl Linnaeus after the Roman emperor Publius Licinius Valerianus who was said to use the plant as medicine. The emperor's personal name comes from Valeria and the Latin verb valeo which means "to be strong".

32 previously recognized genera, including Centranthus, Fedia, and Plectritis, are now considered synonyms of Valeriana. Species in the former genus Centranthus are unusual in having flowers with "handedness", that is, having neither radial nor bilateral symmetry.

== Botany ==
Valeriana species are herbaceous perennials with woody roots, producing stems bearing fine hairs and trifoliolate, pinnate leaves with serrated edges. The flowers are borne in cymes. Drying leads to plant material developing a strong, musky odour which has been likened to that of the scent glands of male cats.

== Fossil record ==
Fossil seeds of Valeriana sp, among them †Valeriana pliocenica, have been recovered from Late Miocene deposits of southern Ukraine, and from Pliocene deposits of south-eastern Belarus and Bashkortostan in central Russia. The fossil seeds are most similar to the extant European Valeriana simplicifolia (a subspecies of Valeriana dioica).

== Species ==
As of July 2024, Plants of the World Online accepts over 435 species and hybrids, including:

- Valeriana alypifolia Kunth
- Valeriana amazonum (Fridl. & A.Raynal) Christenh. & Byng
- Valeriana aretioides Kunth
- Valeriana asterothrix Killip
- Valeriana bertiscea Pančić
- Valeriana buxifolia F.G.Mey.
- Valeriana calcitrapae L.
- Valeriana californica A.Heller
- Valeriana celtica L. – Alpine valerian or valerian spikenard
- Valeriana cernua B.Eriksen
- Valeriana ciliosa (Greene) Byng & Christenh. (2018) – longspur seablush
- Valeriana coleophylla Diels
- Valeriana dioica L. – marsh valerian
- Valeriana edulis Nutt.
- Valeriana eriocarpa (Desv.) Christenh. & Byng – Italian corn salad
- Valeriana fauriei Briq. – Korean valerian
- Valeriana locusta L. – corn salad, lamb's lettuce, mâche, fetticus
- Valeriana macrocera (Torr. & A.Gray) Byng & Christenh. – longhorn seablush
- Valeriana macrosiphon (Boiss.) E.Vilm. – long-spurred valerian
- Valeriana montana L.
- Valeriana occidentalis A.Heller
- Valeriana officinalis L. – garden valerian
- Valeriana pauciflora Michx.
- Valeriana phu L.
- Valeriana pyrenaica L. – Pyrenean valerian
- Valeriana rubra L. – red valerian
- Valeriana secunda B.Eriksen
- Valeriana sitchensis Bong. – Sitka valerian
- Valeriana trinervis Viv.
- Valeriana uliginosa (Torr. & A.Gray) Rydb.
- Valeriana umbilicata (Sull.) Christenh. & Byng – navel corn salad
- Valeriana woodsiana (Torr. & A.Gray) Christenh. & Byng – beaked corn salad

== Gallery ==
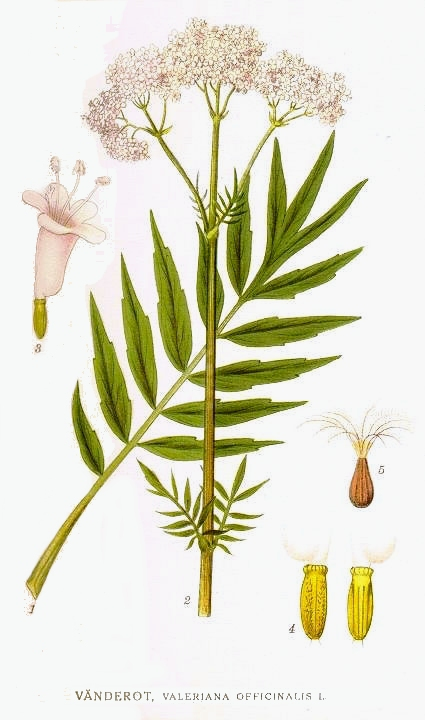
Valeriana officinalis

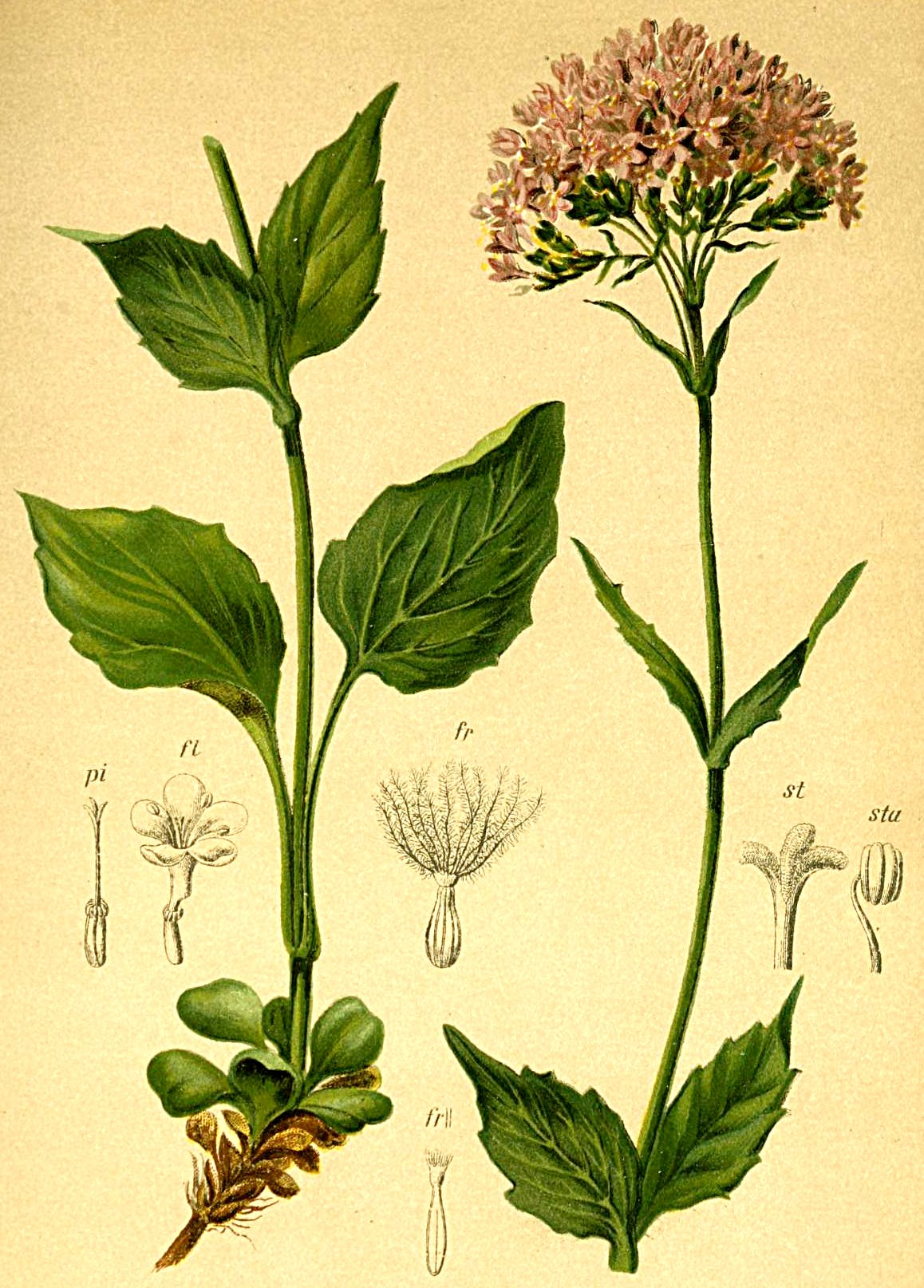
V. montana
