= List of Valeriana species =

The following species in the flowering plant genus Valeriana, the valerians, are accepted by Plants of the World Online. The South American genus Fedia was found to be nested within Valeriana.

== A ==
- Valeriana acutiloba Rydb.
- Valeriana adscendens Turcz.
- Valeriana aegaea Christenh. & Byng
- Valeriana aequiloba Clos
- Valeriana agrimoniifolia Killip
- Valeriana ajanensis Kom.
- Valeriana albiflora (Sharipova) Sharipova
- Valeriana albonervata B.L.Rob. ex Seaton
- Valeriana alliariifolia Vahl
- Valeriana alpestris Steven
- Valeriana altaica Sumnev.
- Valeriana alternifolia Ledeb.
- Valeriana alypifolia Kunth
- Valeriana amarella (Lindh. ex Engelm.) Christenh. & Byng
- Valeriana amazonum (Fridl. & A.Raynal) Christenh. & Byng
- Valeriana amurensis P.A.Smirn. ex Kom.
- Valeriana angustifolia Mill.
- Valeriana aphanoptera (A.Gray) Byng & Christenh.
- Valeriana apiifolia A.Gray ex S.Watson
- Valeriana apula Pourr.
- Valeriana arborea Killip & Cuatrec.
- Valeriana aretiastra Christenh. & Byng
- Valeriana aretioides Kunth
- Valeriana arizonica A.Gray
- Valeriana arkansana Christenh. & Byng
- Valeriana armena P.A.Smirn.
- Valeriana asarifolia Dufr.
- Valeriana aschersoniana Graebn. ex Weberb.
- Valeriana asplenifolia Killip
- Valeriana asterothrix Killip
- Valeriana atacamensis Borsini
- Valeriana × aurigerana (Giraudias) Christenh. & Byng

== B ==
- Valeriana baltana Graebn.
- Valeriana bambusicaulis Killip
- Valeriana barbareifolia M.Martens & Galeotti
- Valeriana barbulata Diels
- Valeriana battandieri (Maire) Christenh. & Byng
- Valeriana beddomei C.B.Clarke
- Valeriana belonantha Christenh. & Byng
- Valeriana bertiscea Pancic
- Valeriana boelckei Rossow
- Valeriana boliviana Britton
- Valeriana bolkarica Contandr. & Quézel
- Valeriana bornmuelleri Pilg.
- Valeriana borsinii Rossow
- Valeriana brachystemon (Fisch. & C.A.Mey.) Byng & Christenh.
- Valeriana bracteata Benth.
- Valeriana bracteosa Phil.
- Valeriana bractescens (Hook.) Höck
- Valeriana × braunii-blanquetii Lakuic
- Valeriana bridgesii Hook. & Arn.
- Valeriana briquetiana H.Lév.
- Valeriana bryophila Barrie
- Valeriana buxifolia F.G.Mey.

== C ==
- Valeriana calcitrapae L.
- Valeriana californica A.Heller
- Valeriana calvescens Briq.
- Valeriana calycina (Maire) Christenh. & Byng
- Valeriana candolleana Gardner
- Valeriana caparaoensis Rabuske, Sobral & Iganci
- Valeriana capensis Thunb.
- Valeriana capitata Pall. ex Link
- Valeriana cardamines M.Bieb.
- Valeriana carinata (Loisel.) Christenh. & Byng
- Valeriana carnosa Sm.
- Valeriana castellanosii Borsini
- Valeriana catharinensis Graebn.
- Valeriana caucasica (Boiss.) Christenh. & Byng
- Valeriana celtica L.
- Valeriana cephalantha Schltdl.
- Valeriana ceratophylla Kunth
- Valeriana cernua B.Eriksen
- Valeriana cerosifolia Xena
- Valeriana chaerophylloides Sm.
- Valeriana chamaedryfolia Cham. & Schltdl.
- Valeriana chenopodiifolia (Pursh) Christenh. & Byng
- Valeriana chiapensis Barrie
- Valeriana chilensis Borsini
- Valeriana chionophila Popov & Kult.
- Valeriana ciliosa (Greene) Byng & Christenh.
- Valeriana clarionifolia Phil.
- Valeriana clarkei Briq.
- Valeriana clematitis Kunth
- Valeriana coarctata Ruiz & Pav.
- Valeriana colchica Utkin
- Valeriana coleophylla Diels
- Valeriana columbiana Piper
- Valeriana comosa B.Eriksen
- Valeriana condamoana Graebn.
- Valeriana congesta (Lindl.) Byng & Christenh.
- Valeriana connata Ruiz & Pav.
- Valeriana convallarioides (Schmale) B.B.Larsen
- Valeriana cornucopiae L.
- Valeriana coronata (L.) Mill.
- Valeriana corymbulosa (Wedd.) Cabrera
- Valeriana corynodes Borsini
- Valeriana costata Schmale
- Valeriana crassifolia Kunth
- Valeriana crassipes (Wedd.) Höck
- Valeriana crinii Orph. ex Boiss.
- Valeriana crispa Ruiz & Pav.
- Valeriana cuatrecasasii F.G.Mey.
- Valeriana cucurbitifolia Standl.
- Valeriana cumbemayensis B.Eriksen
- Valeriana cyclophylla Graebn.

== D ==
- Valeriana daghestanica Rupr. ex Boiss.
- Valeriana daphniflora Hand.-Mazz.
- Valeriana davyana (Jeps.) Christenh. & Byng
- Valeriana decussata Ruiz & Pav.
- Valeriana deltoidea F.G.Mey.
- Valeriana densa (Wedd.) Höck
- Valeriana densiflora Benth.
- Valeriana dentata (L.) All.
- Valeriana descolei Borsini
- Valeriana dinorrhiza (Griseb.) Höck
- Valeriana dioica L.
- Valeriana dipsacoides Graebn.
- Valeriana discoidea (L.) Willd.
- Valeriana domingensis Urb.
- Valeriana dorotheae (Weberling) Christenh. & Byng
- Valeriana dubia Bunge

== E ==
- Valeriana echinata L.
- Valeriana edulis Nutt.
- Valeriana edwardsensis Christenh. & Byng
- Valeriana effusa Griseb.
- Valeriana eichleriana (C.A.Müll.) Graebn.
- Valeriana × ekmanii F.G.Mey.
- Valeriana elongata Jacq.
- Valeriana emmanuelii Rzed. & Calderón
- Valeriana engleriana Höck
- Valeriana erikae (Graebn.) Christenh. & Byng
- Valeriana eriocarpa (Desv.) Christenh. & Byng
- Valeriana eriophylla (Ledeb.) Utkin
- Valeriana erotica Christenh. & Byng
- Valeriana eupatoria Sobral
- Valeriana excelsa Poir.
- Valeriana extincta Christenh. & Byng

== F ==
- Valeriana fauriei Briq.
- Valeriana fedtschenkoi Coincy
- Valeriana ferax (Griseb.) Höck
- Valeriana ficariifolia Boiss.
- Valeriana flaccidissima Maxim.
- Valeriana flagellifera Batalin
- Valeriana florifera (Shinners) Christenh. & Byng
- Valeriana fonkii Phil.
- Valeriana fragilis Clos

== G ==
- Valeriana gaimanensis N.Nagah.
- Valeriana galeottiana M.Martens
- Valeriana gallinae Barrie
- Valeriana × gesneri Brügger
- Valeriana gibbosa (Suksd.) Christenh. & Byng
- Valeriana gilgiana Graebn.
- Valeriana × gillotii (Giraudias) ined.
- Valeriana glaziovii Taub.
- Valeriana glechomifolia F.G.Mey.
- Valeriana globiflora Ruiz & Pav.
- Valeriana globularioides Graebn.
- Valeriana globularis A.Gray
- Valeriana graciliflora (Fisch. & C.A.Mey.) Byng & Christenh.
- Valeriana gracilipes Clos
- Valeriana granataea Xena
- Valeriana grandifolia Phil.
- Valeriana grisiana Wedd.
- Valeriana grossheimii Vorosch.

== H ==
- Valeriana hadros Graebn.
- Valeriana hardwickei Wall.
- Valeriana hebecarpa DC.
- Valeriana hengduanensis D.Y.Hong
- Valeriana henrici (Graebn.) B.Eriksen
- Valeriana herrerae Killip
- Valeriana heterocarpa (Pomel) Christenh. & Byng
- Valeriana hiemalis Graebn.
- Valeriana himachalensis V.Prakash & Mehrotra
- Valeriana himalayana Grubov
- Valeriana hirsuta (Emb. & Maire) Christenh. & Byng
- Valeriana hirtella Kunth
- Valeriana hirticalyx L.C.Chiu
- Valeriana hornschuchiana Walp.
- Valeriana hsui M.J.Jung
- Valeriana humahuacensis Borsini
- Valeriana humboldtii Hook. & Arn.
- Valeriana hunzikeri Borsini
- Valeriana hyalinorrhiza Ruiz & Pav.

== I ==
- Valeriana ibika Christenh. & Byng
- Valeriana iganciana C.Rabuske & J.Külkamp
- Valeriana imbricata Killip
- Valeriana inconspicua (Wedd.) Höck
- Valeriana insignis (Suksd.) Christenh. & Byng
- Valeriana interrupta Ruiz & Pav.
- Valeriana isoetifolia Killip
- Valeriana italica Lam.

== J ==
- Valeriana jaeschkei C.B.Clarke
- Valeriana jasminoides Briq.
- Valeriana jatamansi Jones ex Roxb.
- Valeriana jelenevskyi P.A.Smirn.
- Valeriana johannae Weberling
- Valeriana juncea (Boiss. & Heldr.) Christenh. & Byng

== K ==
- Valeriana kamelinii Sharipova
- Valeriana karstenii Briq.
- Valeriana kassarica Kharadze & Kapeller
- Valeriana kawakamii Hayata
- Valeriana kellereri (Stoj., Stef. & T.Georgiev) Christenh. & Byng
- Valeriana kilimandscharica Engl.
- Valeriana kotschyi (Boiss.) Christenh. & Byng
- Valeriana kurtziana Borsini

== L ==
- Valeriana laciniosa M.Martens & Galeotti
- Valeriana lanata Christenh. & Byng
- Valeriana lancifolia Hand.-Mazz.
- Valeriana langei Christenh. & Byng
- Valeriana lapathifolia Vahl
- Valeriana lasiocarpa Griseb.
- Valeriana laxiflora DC.
- Valeriana laxissima Standl. & L.O.Williams
- Valeriana lecoqii (Jord.) Christenh. & Byng
- Valeriana ledoides Graebn.
- Valeriana lepidota Clos
- Valeriana leptothyrsos Graebn.
- Valeriana leschenaultii DC.
- Valeriana leucocarpa DC.
- Valeriana leucophaea DC.
- Valeriana locusta L.
- Valeriana longiflora Willk.
- Valeriana longitubulosa (Schmale) B.Eriksen
- Valeriana lyrata Vahl

== M ==
- Valeriana macbridei Killip
- Valeriana macrocera (Torr. & A.Gray) Byng & Christenh.
- Valeriana macropoda Greenm.
- Valeriana macrorhiza Poepp. ex DC.
- Valeriana macrosiphon (Boiss.) Bailly
- Valeriana maipoana Ravenna
- Valeriana malvacea Graebn.
- Valeriana mandoniana (Wedd.) Höck
- Valeriana mandonii Britton
- Valeriana mapirensis (Britton) Weberling
- Valeriana maroccana (Rouy) Christenh. & Byng
- Valeriana martini (Losco) Christenh. & Byng
- Valeriana martjanovii Krylov
- Valeriana matheziana Christenh. & Byng
- Valeriana meonantha C.Y.Cheng & H.B.Chen
- Valeriana merxmuelleri W.Seitz
- Valeriana microphylla Kunth
- Valeriana micropterina Wedd.
- Valeriana minor (Hook.) Byng & Christenh.
- Valeriana minutiflora Hand.-Mazz.
- Valeriana montana L.
- Valeriana moonii Arn. ex C.B.Clarke
- Valeriana moorei Barrie
- Valeriana moyanoi Speg.
- Valeriana muelleri Graebn.
- Valeriana munozii Borsini
- Valeriana murrayi Krasnob. & Berkut.
- Valeriana mussooriensis V.Prakash, Aswal & Mehrotra

== N ==
- Valeriana nahuelbutae Penneck.
- Valeriana naidae Barrie
- Valeriana neglecta R.Bernal
- Valeriana nelsonii Greenm.
- Valeriana nevadensis (Boiss.) Christenh. & Byng
- Valeriana nigricans Graebn.
- Valeriana niphobia Briq.
- Valeriana nivalis Wedd.
- Valeriana nuttallii (Torr. & A.Gray) Christenh. & Byng (unplaced)

== O ==
- Valeriana oaxacana Barrie
- Valeriana oblongifolia Ruiz & Pav.
- Valeriana obtusifolia DC.
- Valeriana obtusiloba (Boiss.) Christenh. & Byng
- Valeriana occidentalis A.Heller
- Valeriana officinalis L.
- Valeriana olenaea Boiss. & Heldr.
- Valeriana oligantha Boiss. & Heldr.
- Valeriana orbiculata Sm.
- Valeriana organensis (C.A.Müll.) Gardner
- Valeriana otomiana Barrie
- Valeriana oxyrhyncha (Fisch. & C.A.Mey.) Christenh. & Byng
- Valeriana ozarkana (Dyal) Christenh. & Byng

== P ==
- Valeriana pallescens (Maire) Byng & Christenh.
- Valeriana palmatiloba F.G.Mey.
- Valeriana palmeri A.Gray
- Valeriana paniculata Ruiz & Pav.
- Valeriana papilla Bertero ex DC.
- Valeriana pardoana Graebn.
- Valeriana parvula Killip
- Valeriana pauciflora Michx.
- Valeriana paucijuga Sumnev.
- Valeriana paulae (Graebn.) Christenh. & Byng
- Valeriana peltata Clos
- Valeriana pennellii Killip
- Valeriana petersenii Weberling & Reese-Krug
- Valeriana petrophila Bunge
- Valeriana philippiana Briq.
- Valeriana phitosiana Quézel & Contandr.
- Valeriana phu L.
- Valeriana phylicoides (Turcz.) Briq.
- Valeriana pilosa Ruiz & Pav.
- Valeriana pinnatifida Ruiz & Pav.
- Valeriana plagiostephana (Fisch. & C.A.Mey.) Christenh. & Byng
- Valeriana plectritoides Graebn.
- Valeriana pleurota Christenh. & Byng
- Valeriana polemonifolia Phil.
- Valeriana polybotrya (Griseb.) Höck
- Valeriana polyclada Briq.
- Valeriana polystachya Sm.
- Valeriana pontica (Lipsky) Christenh. & Byng
- Valeriana potopensis Briq.
- Valeriana pratensis Dierb.
- Valeriana prionophylla Standl.
- Valeriana protenta B.Eriksen
- Valeriana psychrophila Briq.
- Valeriana pulchella M.Martens & Galeotti
- Valeriana pulvinata (Rauh & Willer) Christenh. & Byng
- Valeriana pumila (L.) Willd.
- Valeriana punctata F.G.Mey.
- Valeriana pycnantha A.Gray
- Valeriana pyramidalis Kunth
- Valeriana pyrenaica L.
- Valeriana pyricarpa Borsini
- Valeriana pyrolifolia Decne.

== Q ==
- Valeriana quadrangularis Kunth
- Valeriana quindiensis Killip
- Valeriana quirorana Xena

== R ==
- Valeriana radicalis Clos
- Valeriana radicata Graebn.
- Valeriana reitziana Borsini
- Valeriana renifolia Killip
- Valeriana reverdattoana Sumnev.
- Valeriana rhizantha A.Gray
- Valeriana rigida Ruiz & Pav.
- Valeriana rimosa (Bastard) Christenh. & Byng
- Valeriana robertianifolia Briq.
- Valeriana rosaliana F.G.Mey.
- Valeriana rossica P.A.Smirn.
- Valeriana roylei Klotzsch
- Valeriana rubra L.
- Valeriana rufescens Killip
- Valeriana ruizlealii Borsini
- Valeriana rumicoides Wedd.
- Valeriana rusbyi Britton
- Valeriana rzedowskiorum Barrie

== S ==
- Valeriana salicariifolia Vahl
- Valeriana saliunca All.
- Valeriana samolifolia (Bertero) Colla
- Valeriana saxatilis L.
- Valeriana saxicola C.A.Mey.
- Valeriana scandens L.
- Valeriana schachristanica Kamelin & B.A.Sharipova
- Valeriana sclerocarpa (Fisch. & C.A.Mey.) Christenh. & Byng
- Valeriana scouleri Rydb.
- Valeriana secunda B.Eriksen
- Valeriana sedifolia d'Urv.
- Valeriana selerorum Graebn. & Loes.
- Valeriana senecioides Phil.
- Valeriana serrata Ruiz & Pav.
- Valeriana serratifolia J.M.Acosta, L.Salomón & C.A.Zanotti
- Valeriana sibthorpii (Heldr. & Sart. ex Boiss.) Christenh. & Byng
- Valeriana sichuanica D.Y.Hong
- Valeriana sieberi (Heldr.) Christenh. & Byng
- Valeriana sisymbriifolia Vahl
- Valeriana sitchensis Bong.
- Valeriana smithii Killip
- Valeriana sobraliana Rabuske & Iganci
- Valeriana sorbifolia Kunth
- Valeriana spathulata Ruiz & Pav.
- Valeriana speluncaria Boiss.
- Valeriana sphaerocarpa Phil.
- Valeriana sphaerocephala Graebn.
- Valeriana sphaerophora Graebn.
- Valeriana spicata (Turcz.) Briq.
- Valeriana spiroflora B.B.Larsen
- Valeriana stenophylla Killip
- Valeriana stenoptera Diels
- Valeriana stolonifera Czern.
- Valeriana stracheyi C.B.Clarke
- Valeriana stricta Clos
- Valeriana stuckertii Briq.
- Valeriana sulcata (Pomel) Christenh. & Byng
- Valeriana supina Ard.
- Valeriana szovitsiana (Fisch. & C.A.Mey.) Christenh. & Byng

== T ==
- Valeriana tachirensis Xena
- Valeriana tafiensis Borsini
- Valeriana tajuvensis Sobral
- Valeriana tanacetifolia F.G.Mey.
- Valeriana tangutica Batalin
- Valeriana tatamana Killip
- Valeriana tessendorffiana Graebn.
- Valeriana texana Steyerm.
- Valeriana theodorici (Weberling) B.Eriksen
- Valeriana tiliifolia Troickij
- Valeriana tomentosa Kunth
- Valeriana transjenisensis Kreyer
- Valeriana trichomanes Graebn.
- Valeriana trichostoma Hand.-Mazz.
- Valeriana trinervis Viv.
- Valeriana triphylla Kunth
- Valeriana triplaris (Boiss. & Buhse) Christenh. & Byng
- Valeriana triplinervis (Turcz.) Briq.
- Valeriana tripteris L.
- Valeriana tuberculata (Boiss.) Christenh. & Byng
- Valeriana tuberifera Graebn.
- Valeriana tuberosa L.
- Valeriana tucumana Borsini
- Valeriana tunuyanense Méndez
- Valeriana turgida (Steven) Christenh. & Byng
- Valeriana turkestanica Sumnev.
- Valeriana tzotziliana Barrie

== U ==
- Valeriana ulei Graebn.
- Valeriana uliginosa (Torr. & A.Gray) Rydb.
- Valeriana umbilicata (Sull.) Christenh. & Byng
- Valeriana uncinata M.Bieb.
- Valeriana urbani Phil.
- Valeriana urticifolia Kunth

== V ==
- Valeriana vaga Clos
- Valeriana vaginata Kunth
- Valeriana valdiviana Phil.
- Valeriana velutina Clos
- Valeriana venezuelana Briq.
- Valeriana verrucosa Schmale
- Valeriana verticillata Clos
- Valeriana vesicaria (L.) Mill.
- Valeriana vetasana Killip
- Valeriana vilcabambensis Sylvester & Barrie
- Valeriana virescens Clos
- Valeriana virgata Ruiz & Pav.
- Valeriana volkensii Engl.

== W ==
- Valeriana wandae (Graebn. & Tessend.) Christenh. & Byng
- Valeriana warburgii Graebn.
- Valeriana weberbaueri Graebn.
- Valeriana weddelliana Rouy
- Valeriana wolgensis Kazak.
- Valeriana woodsiana (Torr. & A.Gray) Christenh. & Byng

== Z ==
- Valeriana zamoranensis Rzed. & Calderón
- Valeriana zapotecana Barrie
