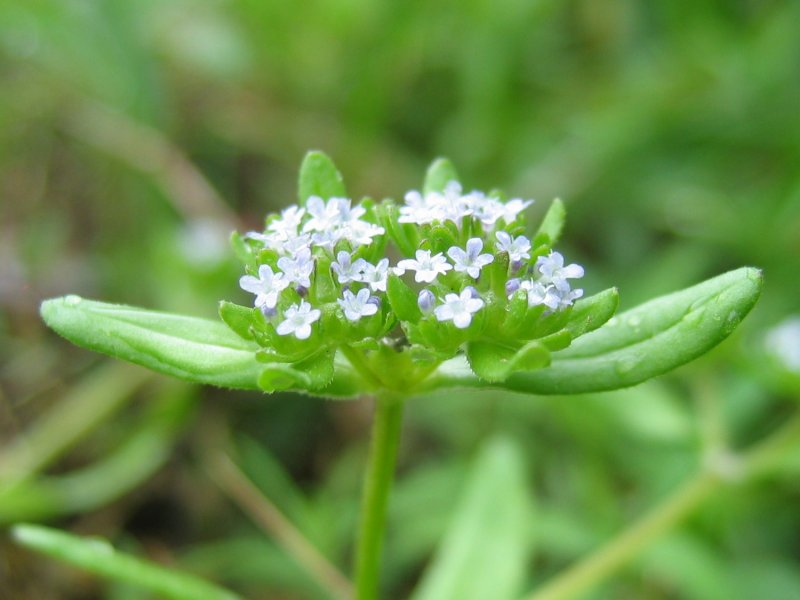
- Valerianella locusta

Scientific classification
- Kingdom: Plantae
- Clade: Embryophytes
- Clade: Tracheophytes
- Clade: Angiosperms
- Clade: Eudicots
- Clade: Asterids
- Order: Dipsacales
- Family: Caprifoliaceae
- Subfamily: Valerianoideae
- Genus: Valerianella; Mill. (1754)

Species
- 23; see text

= Valerianella =

Genus of flowering plants in the honeysuckle family

Valerianella is a genus of flowering plant in family Caprifoliaceae. It includes 23 species native to the Mediterranean Basin of southern Europe and North Africa, western and central Asia, Madeira and the Azores, and Ethiopia and Kenya. Many species formerly placed in Valerianella, including those native to the Americas, have been moved to Valeriana. Plants of Valerianella and Valeriana are sometimes known by the common name corn salad or cornsalad.

== Species ==
23 species are accepted.

1. Valerianella abyssinica Fresen.
2. Valerianella adylovii M.N.Abdull.
3. Valerianella amblyotis Fisch. & C.A.Mey. ex Hohen.
4. Valerianella antilibanotica Rech.f.
5. Valerianella balansae V.A.Matthews
6. Valerianella chlorodonta Coss. & Durieu
7. Valerianella chlorostephana Boiss. & Balansa
8. Valerianella corniculata C.A.Mey.
9. Valerianella deserticola Hadac
10. Valerianella falconida Shvedtsch.
11. Valerianella glomerata Boiss. & Balansa
12. Valerianella kulabensis Lipsky ex Lincz.
13. Valerianella leptocarpa Pomel
14. Valerianella multidentata Loscos & J.Pardo
15. Valerianella orientalis (Schltdl.) Boiss. & Balansa
16. Valerianella ovczinnikovii Sharipova
17. Valerianella petrovichii Asch.
18. Valerianella platycarpa Trautv.
19. Valerianella pomelii Batt.
20. Valerianella stenocarpa (Engelm. ex Gray) Krok
21. Valerianella stephanodon Coss. & Durieu
22. Valerianella triceras Bornm.
23. Valerianella turcica Doğru-Koca & G.Zare
24. Valerianella varzobica Sharipova
25. Valerianella × zoltanii Borbás (unplaced)

=== Formerly placed here ===
1. Valeriana aegaea Christenh. & Byng (as Valerianella hirsutissima Link)
2. Valeriana amarella (Lindh. ex Engelm.) Christenh. & Byng (as Valerianella amarella (Lindh. ex Engelm.) Krok) – hairy corn salad
3. Valeriana arkansana Christenh. & Byng (as Valerianella palmeri Dyal) – Palmer's corn salad
4. Valeriana carinata (Loisel.) Christenh. & Byng (as Valerianella carinata Loisel.) – European corn salad
5. Valeriana chenopodiifolia (Pursh) Christenh. & Byng (as Valerianella chenopodiifolia (Pursh) DC.) – goosefoot corn salad
6. Valeriana coronata (L.) Mill. (as Valerianella coronata (L.) DC.)
7. Valeriana cymbaecarpa (C.A.Mey.) Sennikov (as Valerianella cymbaecarpa C.A.Mey.)
8. Valeriana dactylophylla (Boiss. & Hohen.) Sennikov (as Valerianella dactylophylla Boiss. & Hohen.)
9. Valeriana dentata (L.) All. (as Valerianella dentata (L.) Pollich and Valerianella godayana Fanlo) – narrowfruit corn salad
10. Valeriana discoidea (L.) Willd. (as Valerianella discoidea (L.) Loisel.)
11. Valeriana echinata L. (as Valerianella echinata (L.) DC.)
12. Valeriana edwardsensis Christenh. & Byng (as Valerianella texana Dyal) – Edwards Plateau corn salad
13. Valeriana eriocarpa (Desv.) Christenh. & Byng (as Valerianella eriocarpa Desv.) – Italian corn salad
14. Valeriana extincta Christenh. & Byng (as Valerianella affinis Balf.f.) – believed extinct
15. Valeriana florifera (Shinners) Christenh. & Byng (as Valerianella florifera Shinners) – Texas corn salad
16. Valeriana ibika Christenh. & Byng (as Valerianella puberula (Bertol.) DC.)
17. Valeriana kotschyi (Boiss.) Christenh. & Byng (as Valerianella kotschyi Boiss.)
18. Valeriana lanata Christenh. & Byng (as Valerianella lasiocarpa (Steven) Betcke)
19. Valeriana langei Christenh. & Byng (as Valerianella divaricata Lange)
20. Valeriana locusta L. (as Valerianella locusta (L.) Laterr.) – corn salad, lamb's lettuce, mâche, fetticus
21. Valeriana matheziana Christenh. & Byng (as Valerianella longiflora (Torr. & A.Gray) Walp. – longtube corn salad
22. Valeriana martini (Losco) Christenh. & Byng (as Valerianella martini Loscos)
23. Valeriana muricata (Steven ex M.Bieb.) Sennikov (as Valerianella muricata (Steven ex M.Bieb.) W.H.Baxter)
24. Valeriana nuttallii (Torr. & A.Gray) Christenh. & Byng (as Valerianella nuttallii (Torr. & A.Gray) Walp.) – Nuttall's corn salad
25. Valeriana obtusiloba (Boiss.) Christenh. & Byng (as Valerianella obtusiloba Boiss.)
26. Valeriana orientalis (DC.) Sennikov (as Valerianella leiocarpa (K.Koch) Kuntze)
27. Valeriana oxyrhyncha (Fisch. & C.A.Mey.) Christenh. & Byng (as Valerianella oxyrhyncha Fisch. & C.A.Mey., V. anodon Lincz., and V. diodon Boiss.)
28. Valeriana ozarkana (Dyal) Christenh. & Byng (as Valerianella ozarkana Dyal) – Ozark corn salad
29. Valeriana plagiostephana (Fisch. & C.A.Mey.) Christenh. & Byng (as Valerianella plagiostephana Fisch. & C.A.Mey.)
30. Valeriana pleurota Christenh. & Byng (as Valerianella costata (Steven) Betcke)
31. Valeriana pontica (Lipsky) Christenh. & Byng (as Valerianella pontica Lipsky)
32. Valeriana pumila (L.) Willd. (as Valerianella pumila (L.) DC.)
33. Valeriana regelii Sennikov (as Valerianella turkestanica Regel & Schmalh.)
34. Valeriana rimosa (Bastard) Christenh. & Byng (as Valerianella rimosa Bastard)
35. Valeriana sclerocarpa (Fisch. & C.A.Mey.) Christenh. & Byng (as Valerianella sclerocarpa Fisch. & C.A.Mey.)
36. Valeriana szovitsiana (Fisch. & C.A.Mey.) Christenh. & Byng (as Valerianella szovitsiana Fisch. & C.A.Mey. and V. vvedenskyi Lincz.)
37. Valeriana triplaris (Boiss. & Buhse) Christenh. & Byng (as Valerianella triplaris Boiss. & Buhse)
38. Valeriana tuberculata (Boiss.) Christenh. & Byng (as Valerianella tuberculata Boiss. and V. aksaensis M.N.Abdull.)
39. Valeriana turgida (Steven) Christenh. & Byng (as Valerianella turgida (Steven) Betcke)
40. Valeriana umbilicata (Sull.) Christenh. & Byng (as Valerianella umbilicata (Sull.) Alph.Wood) – navel corn salad
41. Valeriana uncinata M.Bieb. (as Valerianella uncinata (M.Bieb.) Dufr.)
42. Valeriana vesicaria (L.) Mill. (as Valerianella vesicaria (L.) Moench)
43. Valeriana woodsiana (Torr. & A.Gray) Christenh. & Byng (as Valerianella woodsiana (Torr. & A.Gray) Walp and V. radiata (L.) Dufr.) – beaked corn salad
