= Spikenard =

Type of essential oil

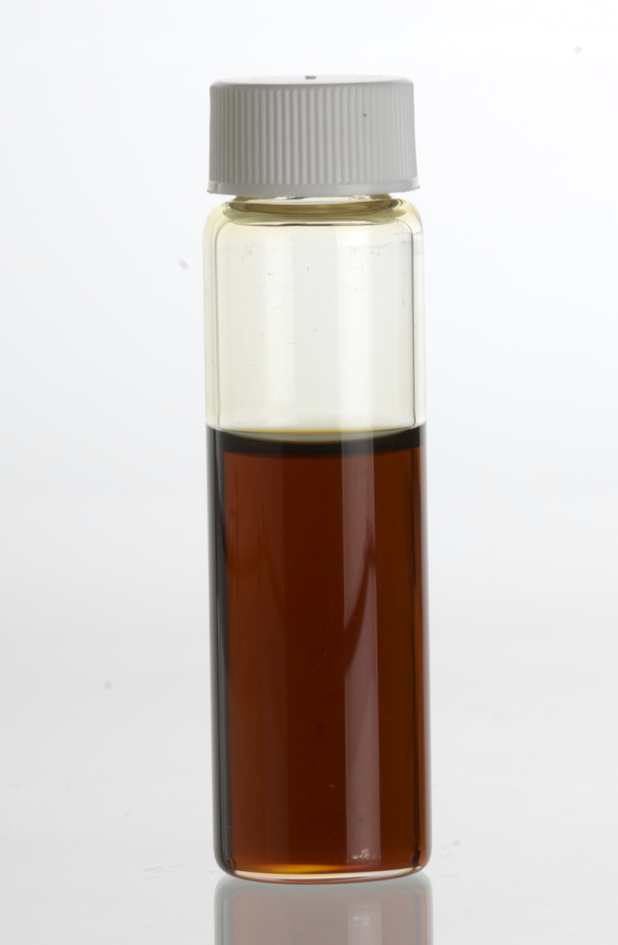
Spikenard (Nardostachys jatamansi) essential oil

Spikenard, also called nard, nardin, and muskroot, is a class of aromatic amber-colored essential oil derived from Nardostachys jatamansi, a flowering plant in the honeysuckle family which grows in the Himalayas of Nepal, China, and India. The oil has been used over centuries as a perfume, a traditional medicine, or in religious ceremonies across a wide territory from India to Europe. Historically, the name nard has also referred to essential oils derived from other species including the closely related valerian genus, as well as Spanish lavender; these cheaper, more common plants have been used in perfume-making, and sometimes to adulterate true spikenard.

== Etymology ==
The name nard is derived from Latin nardus, from Ancient Greek νάρδος (nárdos), from Hebrew: נֵרְדְּ (nērd). This word may ultimately derive either from Sanskrit नलद (nálada 'Indian spikenard'), or from Naarda, an ancient Assyrian city (possibly the modern town of Dohuk, Iraq). The "spike" in the English name refers to the inflorescence or flowering stem of the plant.

== Description ==
Nardostachys jatamansi is a flowering plant of the honeysuckle family that grows in the Himalayas of Nepal, China, and India. In bloom, the plant grows to about 1 meter (3 ft) in height and has small, pink, bell-shaped flowers. It is found at an altitude of about 3,000 to 5,000 m (9,800 to 16,400 ft). Its rhizomes can be crushed and distilled into an intensely aromatic, amber-colored essential oil with a thick consistency.

=== Oil constituents ===
Nard oil is used as a perfume, an incense, and in Ayurvedic practices. Sesquiterpenes contribute to the major portion of the volatile compounds, with the eponymous jatamansone (also known as (-)-valeranone) being dominant. Many coumarins are also present in the oil. The alkaloid actinidine has been isolated from the oil, and valerenal alongside valerenic acid (formerly called nardal and nardin respectively). Among the other phytochemical products found in the rhizomes are: nardostachysin, a terpenoid ester; nardostachnol; nardostachnone; jatamansic acid and jatamansinone.

== History ==
In ancient Rome, nardus was used to flavor wine, and occurs frequently in the recipes of Apicius. During the early Roman empire, nardus was the main ingredient of a perfume (unguentum nardinum).

Pliny's Natural History lists several species of nardus used in making perfume and spiced wine: Indian nard, a stinking nard called 'ozaenitidos' which is not used, a false nard ('pseudo-nard') with which true nard is adulterated, and several herbs local to Europe and the Eastern Mediterranean which are also called nardus, namely Syrian nard, Gallic nard, Cretan nard (also called 'agrion' or 'phun'), field nard (also called 'bacchar'), wild nard (also called 'asaron'), and Celtic nard. Celtic nard is the only species Pliny mentions which he does not describe when listing the species of nard in book 12 of Natural History suggesting it is synonymous with another species, probably with the species Pliny refers to as 'hirculus', a plant Pliny attests to growing in the same region as Gallic nard and which he says is used to adulterate Gallic nard. Both are widely assumed to be cultivars or varieties of Valeriana celtica. Gentner suggests that hirculus may be Valeriana saxatilis L., which, like Valeriana celtica, has a camphor-like odour, but it is less pleasant.

Indian nard refers to Nardostachys jatamansi, stinking nard possibly to Allium victorialis, false nard to Lavandula stoechas, Syrian nard to Cymbopogon nardus, Gallic nard to Valeriana celtica, Cretan nard to Valeriana italica (syn. V. dioscoridis, V. tuberosa), and wild nard to Asarum europaeum. Field nard, or 'bacchar', has not been conclusively identified and must not be confused with species now called "baccharises" referring to species native to North America. The English botanist John Hill mentions that a plant described by Dioscorides as baccharis may refer to ploughman's-spikenard.

== Culture ==
Coat of arms of Pope Francis. According to the Vatican, the plant (to the right of the star) is a spikenard and symbolises Saint Joseph.

Spikenard is mentioned in the Bible as being used for its fragrance.

While the king was on his couch, my nard gave forth its fragrance. My beloved is to me a sachet of myrrh that lies between my breasts.

— Song of Songs 1:12–13 ESV

Then Mary took about a pint of pure nard, an expensive perfume; she poured it on Jesus' feet and wiped his feet with her hair. And the house was filled with the fragrance of the perfume.

— Gospel of John 12:3 NIV

While he was in Bethany, reclining at the table in the home of Simon the Leper, a woman came with an alabaster jar of very expensive perfume, made of pure nard. She broke the jar and poured the perfume on his head.

— Gospel of Mark 14:3 NIV

In the Iberian iconographic tradition of the Catholic Church, the spikenard is used to represent Saint Joseph. The Vatican has said that the coat of arms of Pope Francis includes the spikenard in reference to Saint Joseph.

Nard (Italian nardo) is also mentioned in the Inferno of Dante Alighieri's Divine Comedy:

erba né biado in sua vita non pasce,
ma sol d’incenso lagrime e d’amomo,
e nardo e mirra son l’ultime fasce.

Translation:

He tastes, but tears of frankincense alone
And odorous amomum: swaths of nard
And myrrh his funeral shroud.

Spikenard is also mentioned as an herb protecting Saint Thecla from wild beasts in the apocryphal text The Acts of Paul and Thecla.
