= Valerianella stenocarpa =

Conservation status
- Vulnerable (NatureServe)

Scientific classification
- Kingdom: Plantae
- Clade: Tracheophytes
- Clade: Angiosperms
- Clade: Eudicots
- Clade: Asterids
- Order: Dipsacales
- Family: Caprifoliaceae
- Genus: Valerianella
- Species: V. stenocarpa

Binomial name
- Valerianella stenocarpa (Engelm. ex Gray) Krok

Species of flowering plant

Valeriana stenocarpa is a species of flowering plant.
