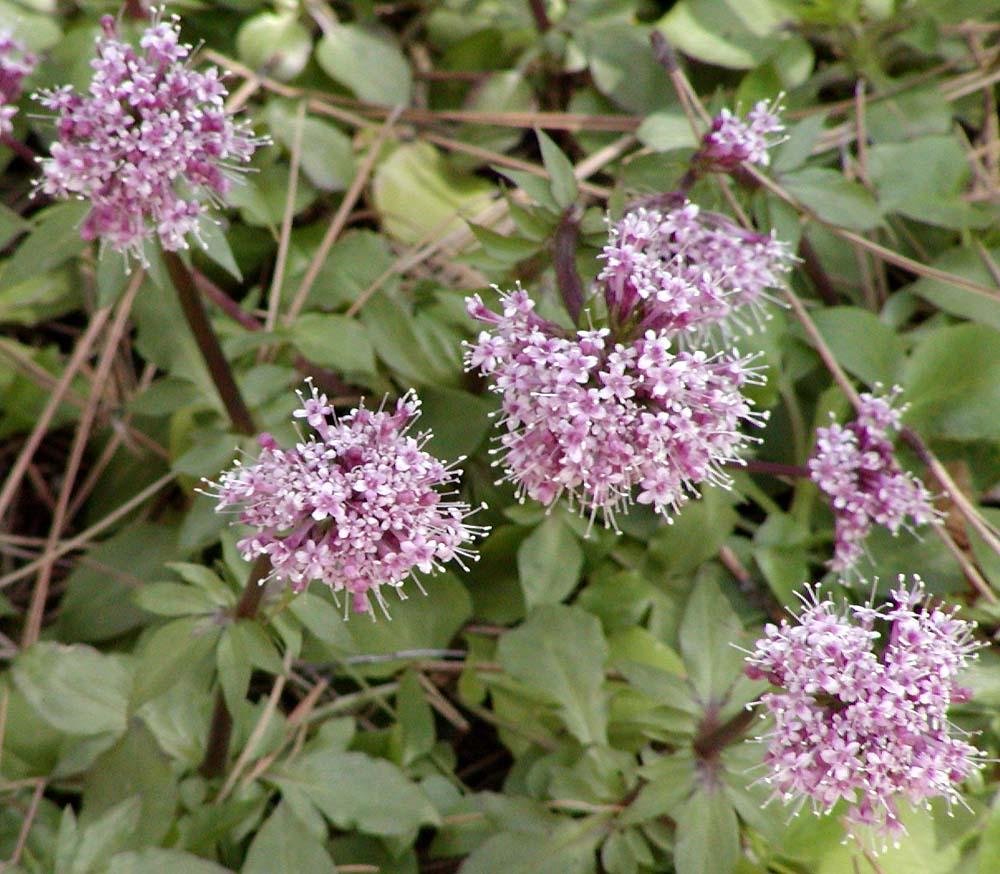
- At the Arboretum at Flagstaff
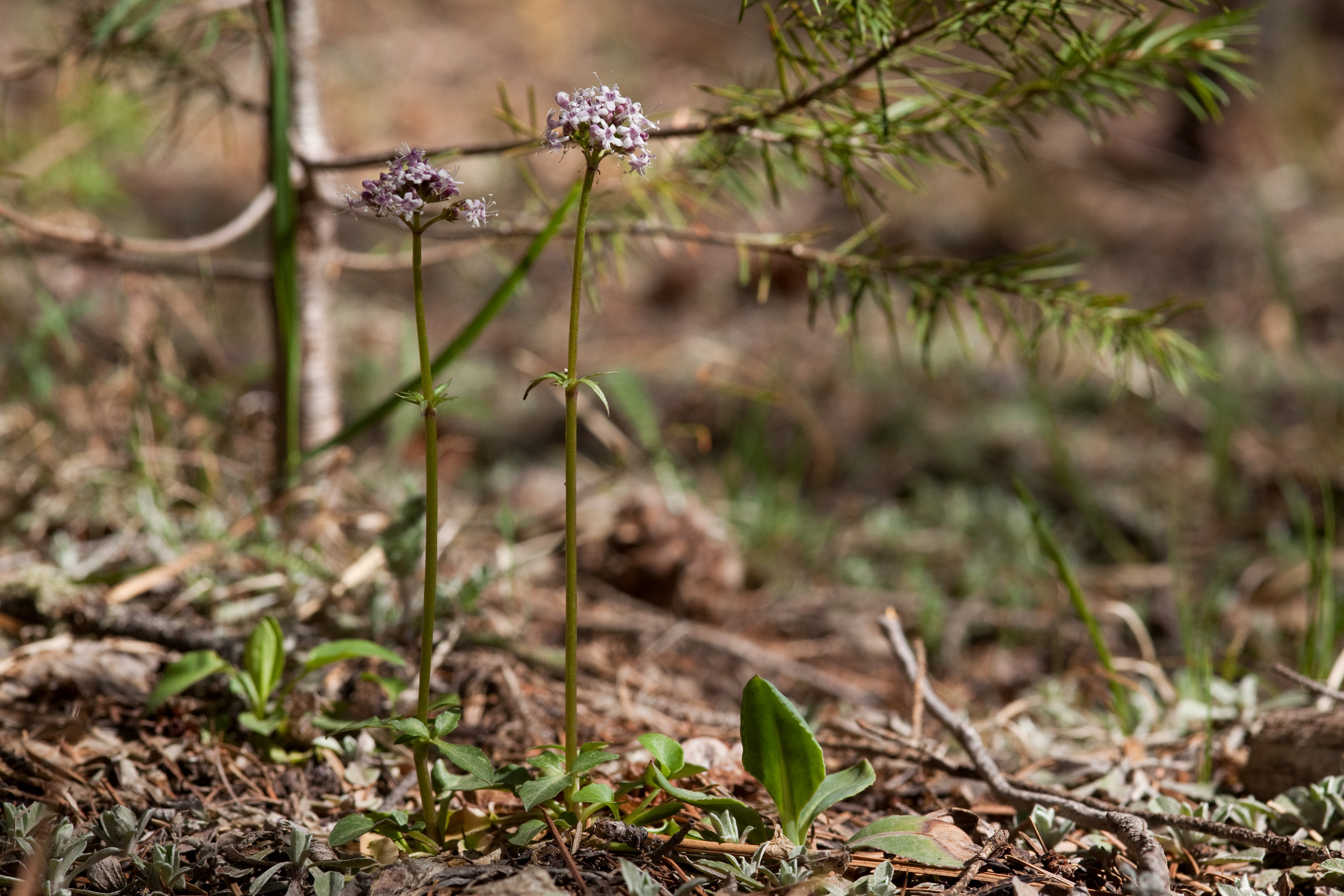
- In New Mexico

Scientific classification
- Kingdom: Plantae
- Clade: Tracheophytes
- Clade: Angiosperms
- Clade: Eudicots
- Clade: Asterids
- Order: Dipsacales
- Family: Caprifoliaceae
- Genus: Valeriana
- Species: V. arizonica

Binomial name
- Valeriana arizonica A.Gray

Synonyms
- Valeriana acutiloba var. ovata (Rydb.) A.Nelson; Valeriana ovata Rydb.

= Valeriana arizonica =

Species of plant

Valeriana arizonica, the Arizona valerian, is a species of flowering plant in the family Caprifoliaceae. It is native to the US states of Utah, Arizona, New Mexico, Colorado, and Texas. A perennial forb reaching 45 cm (18 in), it is found growing in coniferous forests at elevations from 1,400 to 2,400 m (4,500 to 8,000 ft).
