= Valeriana hsui =

Scientific classification
- Kingdom: Plantae
- Clade: Tracheophytes
- Clade: Angiosperms
- Clade: Eudicots
- Clade: Asterids
- Order: Dipsacales
- Family: Caprifoliaceae
- Genus: Valeriana
- Species: V. hsui

Binomial name
- Valeriana hsui M.J.Jung

Species of plant

Valeriana hsui is a species of flowering plant in the family Caprifoliaceae, native and exclusive to Taiwan. Its leaves have a consistent variegation pattern.It has a green leaves with light pink coloured flowers.
