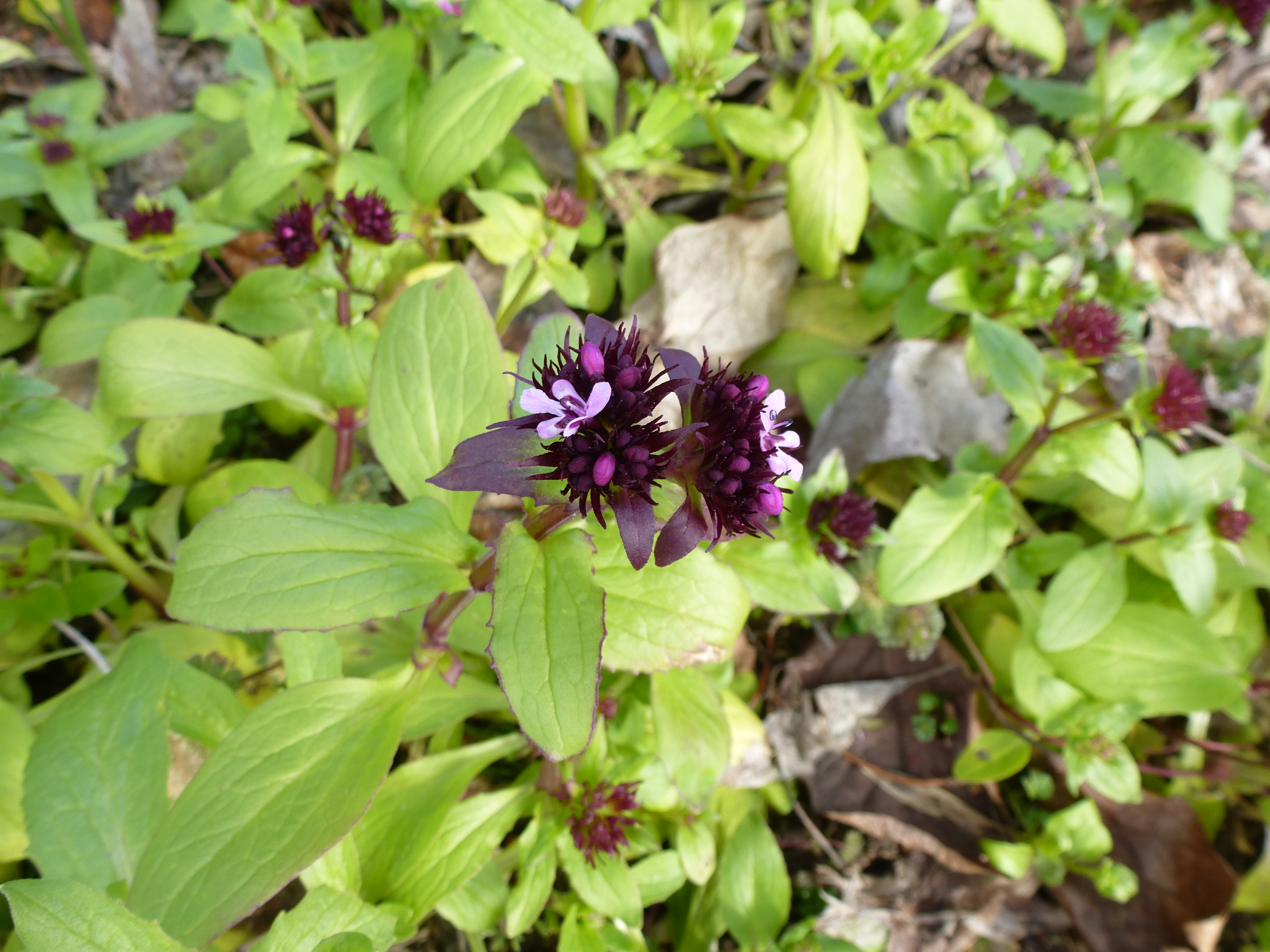

Scientific classification
- Kingdom: Plantae
- Clade: Tracheophytes
- Clade: Angiosperms
- Clade: Eudicots
- Clade: Asterids
- Order: Dipsacales
- Family: Caprifoliaceae
- Genus: Valeriana
- Species: V. graciliflora

Binomial name
- Valeriana graciliflora (Fisch. & C.A.Mey.) Byng & Christenh. (2018)

Synonyms
- Fedia cornucopiae var. graciliflora (Fisch. & C.A.Mey.) Ball; Fedia cornucopiae subsp. graciliflora (Fisch. & C.A.Mey.) Nyman; Fedia graciliflora Fisch. & C.A.Mey. (1840)

= Valeriana graciliflora =

Species of plant

Valeriana graciliflora is a species of flowering plant in the family Caprifoliaceae. It is an annual native to Algeria, the Balearic Islands, mainland Greece and Crete, mainland Italy and Sicily, Libya, and Tunisia. It has been introduced to Corsica, France, Mauritius, and Sardinia.

== Sources ==
This article incorporates text from a free content work. Licensed under CC0 (license statement/permission). Text taken from Fedia graciliflora. Encyclopedia of Life.
