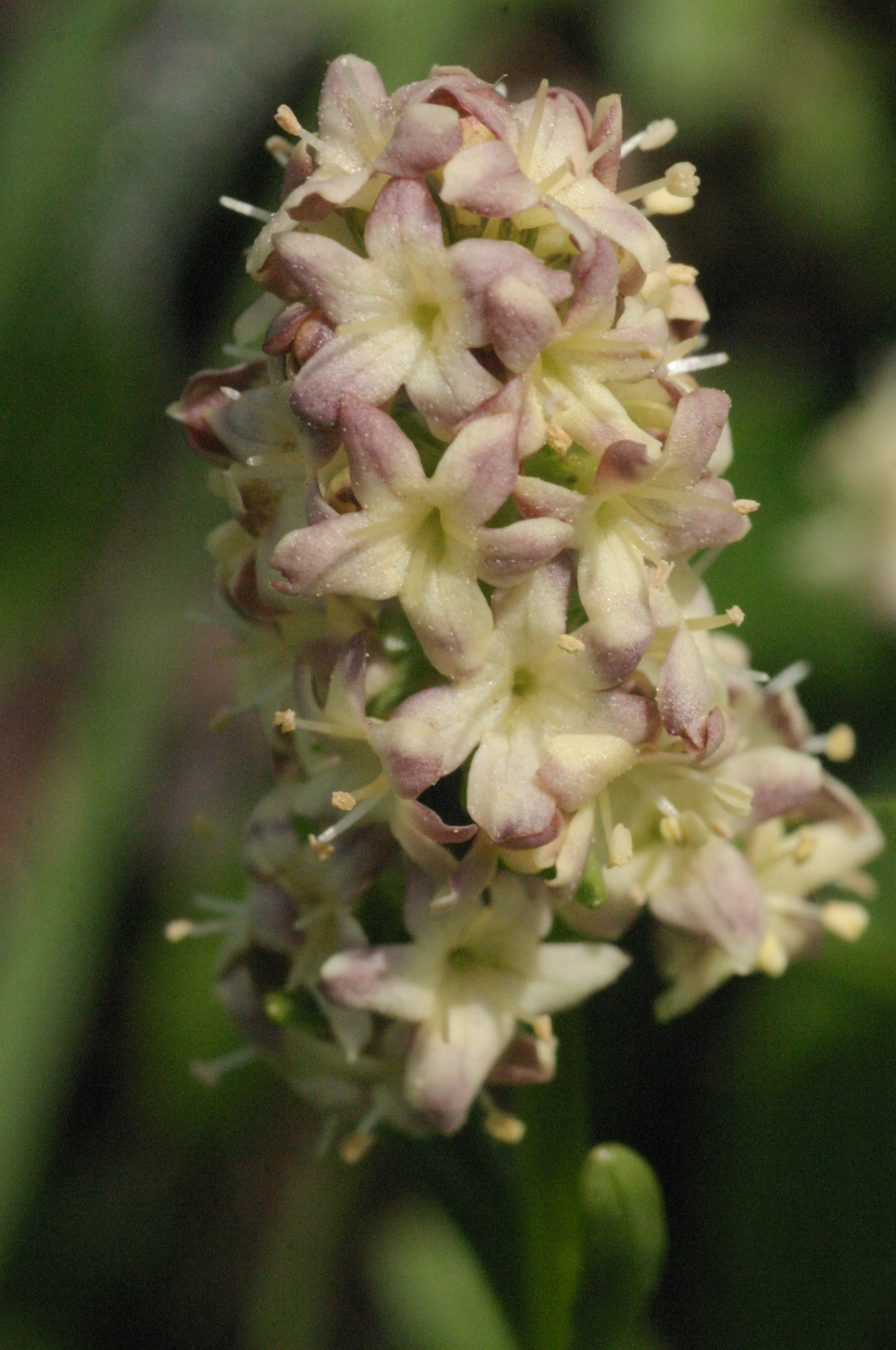

Scientific classification
- Kingdom: Plantae
- Clade: Tracheophytes
- Clade: Angiosperms
- Clade: Eudicots
- Clade: Asterids
- Order: Dipsacales
- Family: Caprifoliaceae
- Genus: Valeriana
- Species: V. celtica

Binomial name
- Valeriana celtica L.

Subspecies
- V. celtica subsp. norica; Valeriana celtica subsp. pancicii; Valeriana celtica subsp. pennina

Synonyms
- Valeriana saxatilis Vill.; Valeriana verticillata Clairv.

= Valeriana celtica =

Species of flowering plant

Valeriana celtica is a species of plant in the family Caprifoliaceae. It is also known as Alpine valerian and valerian spikenard. It is endemic to the Eastern Alps (V. celtica subsp. norica) and to the Graian and Pennine Alps. It grows as a perennial herb 5 to 15 cm (2.0–5.9 in) tall. Along with Valeriana saxatilis and Valeriana elongata, it forms a clade of dioecious plants. Until the 1930s, it was extensively harvested for export to Asia for use in perfumes. The root has been used as a folk remedy as a nerve tonic.

== Gallery ==
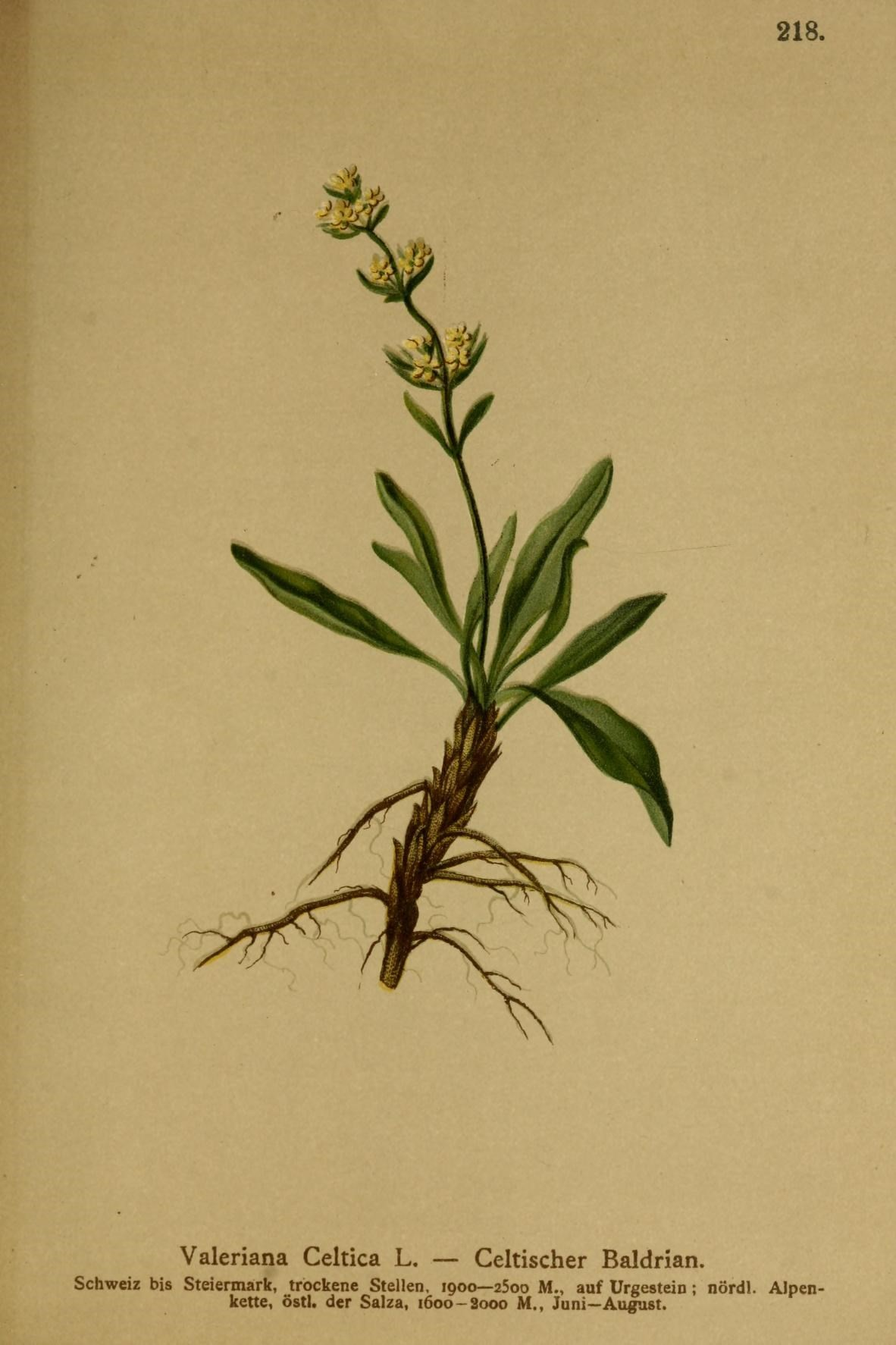
V. celtica from Atlas der Alpenflora, 1882

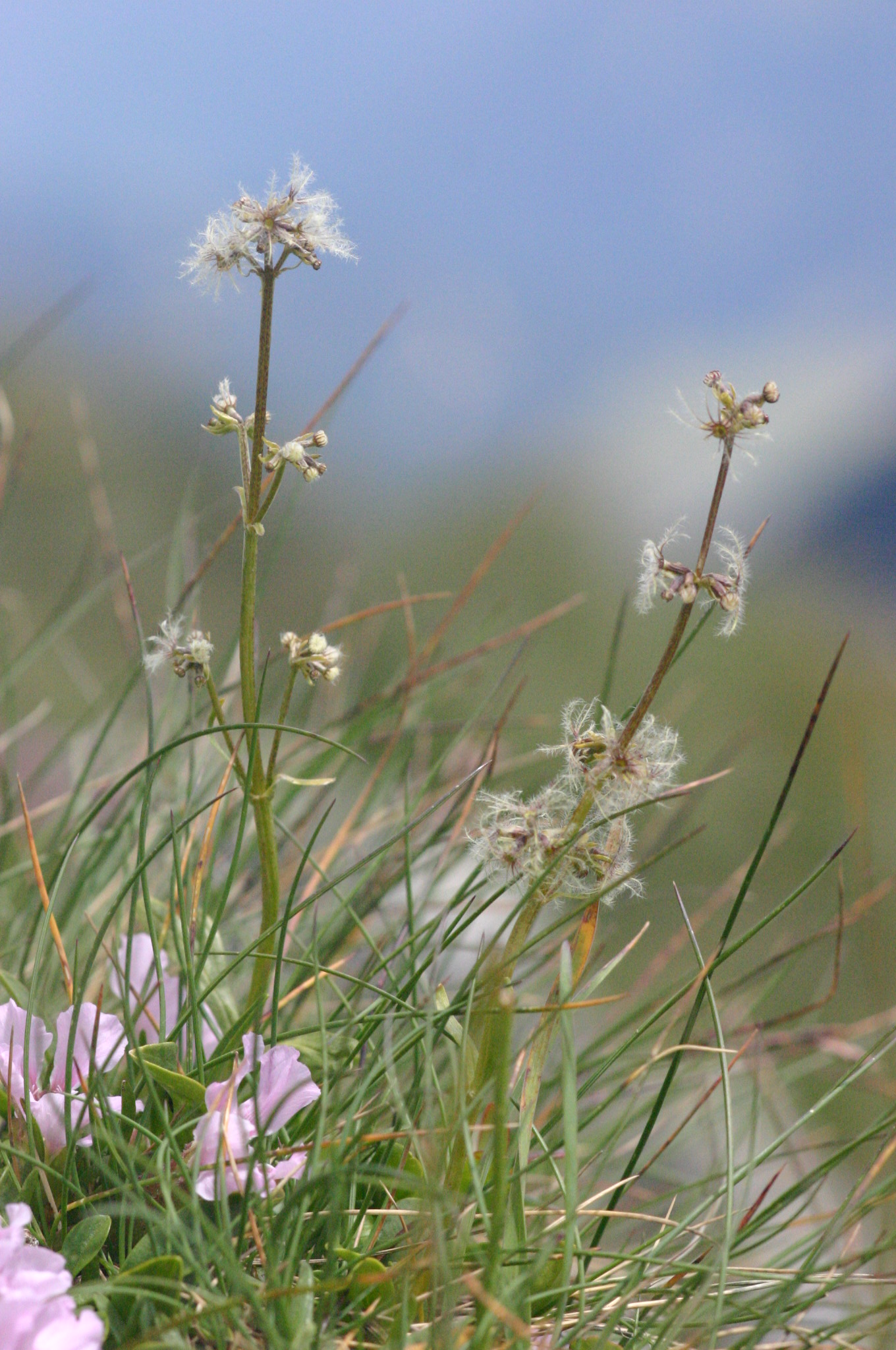
V. celtica in the wild

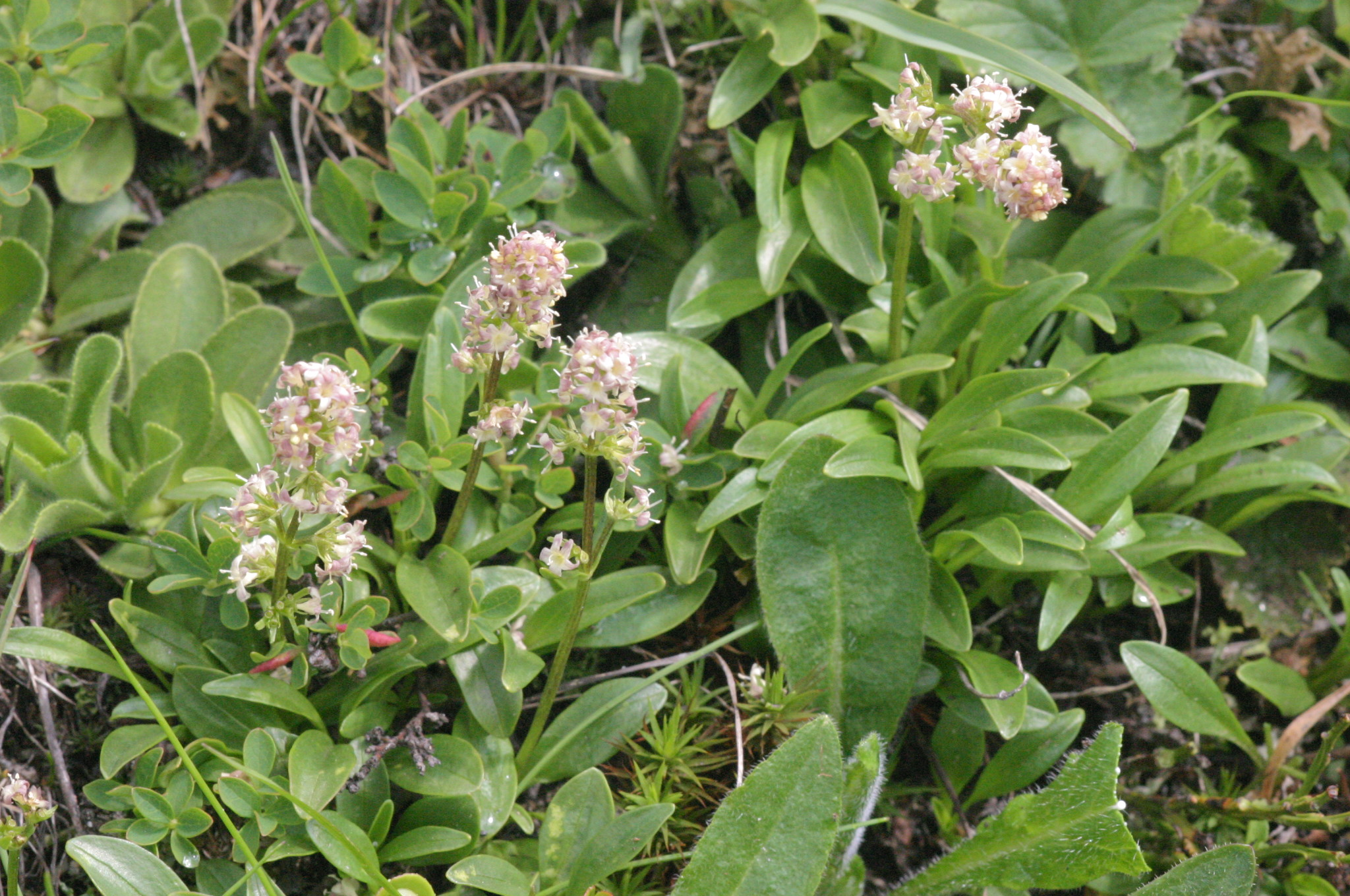

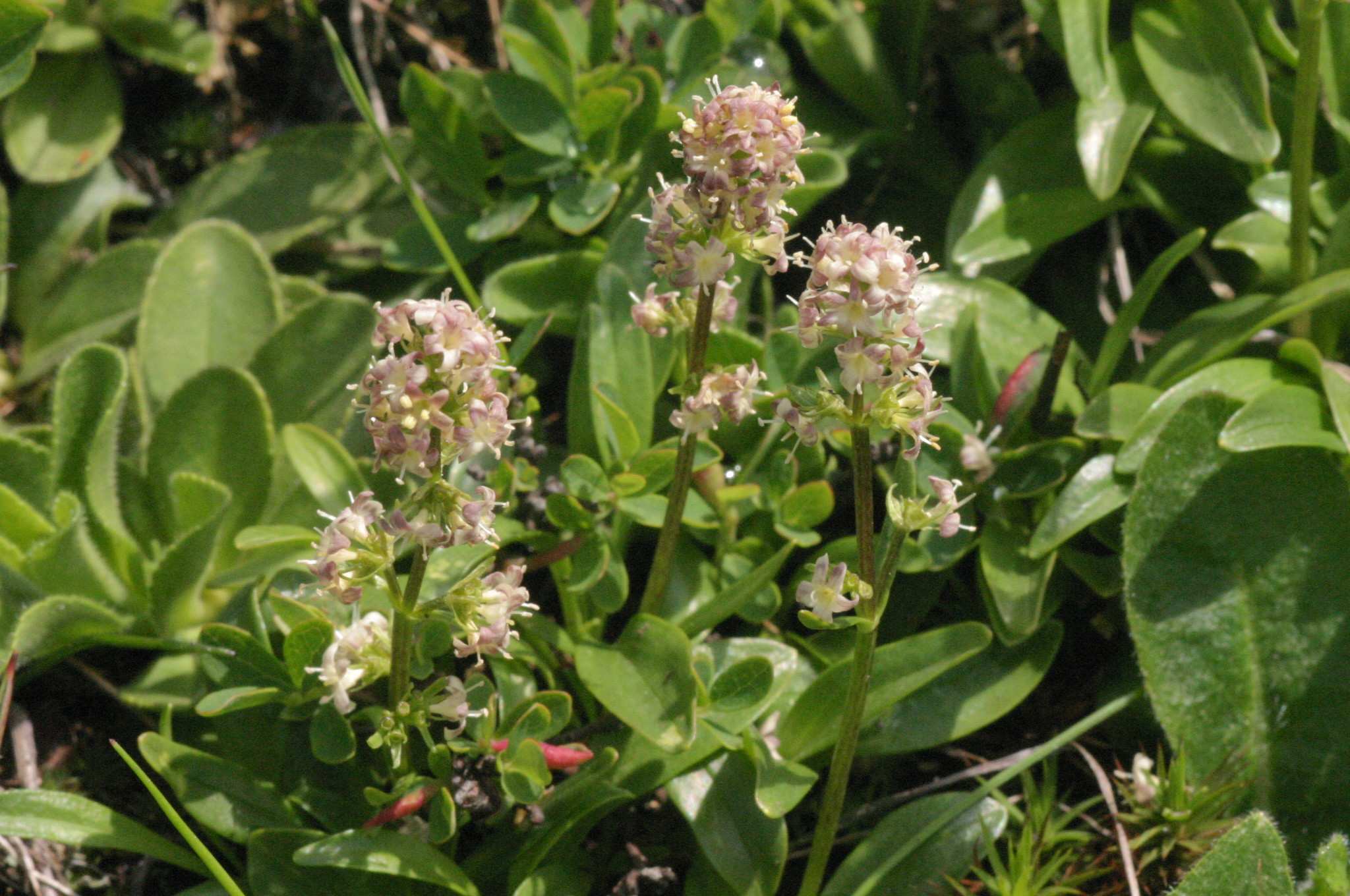

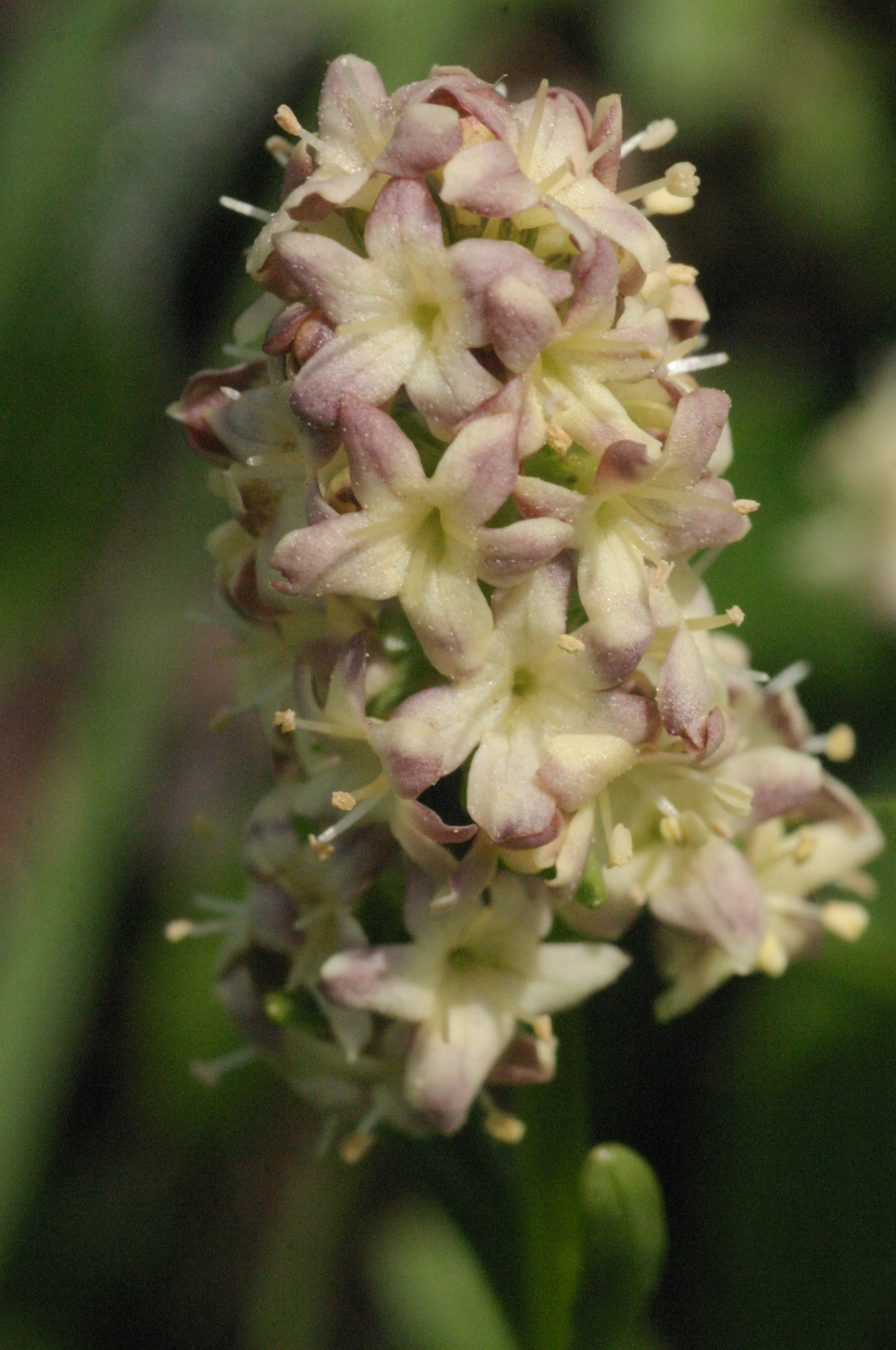

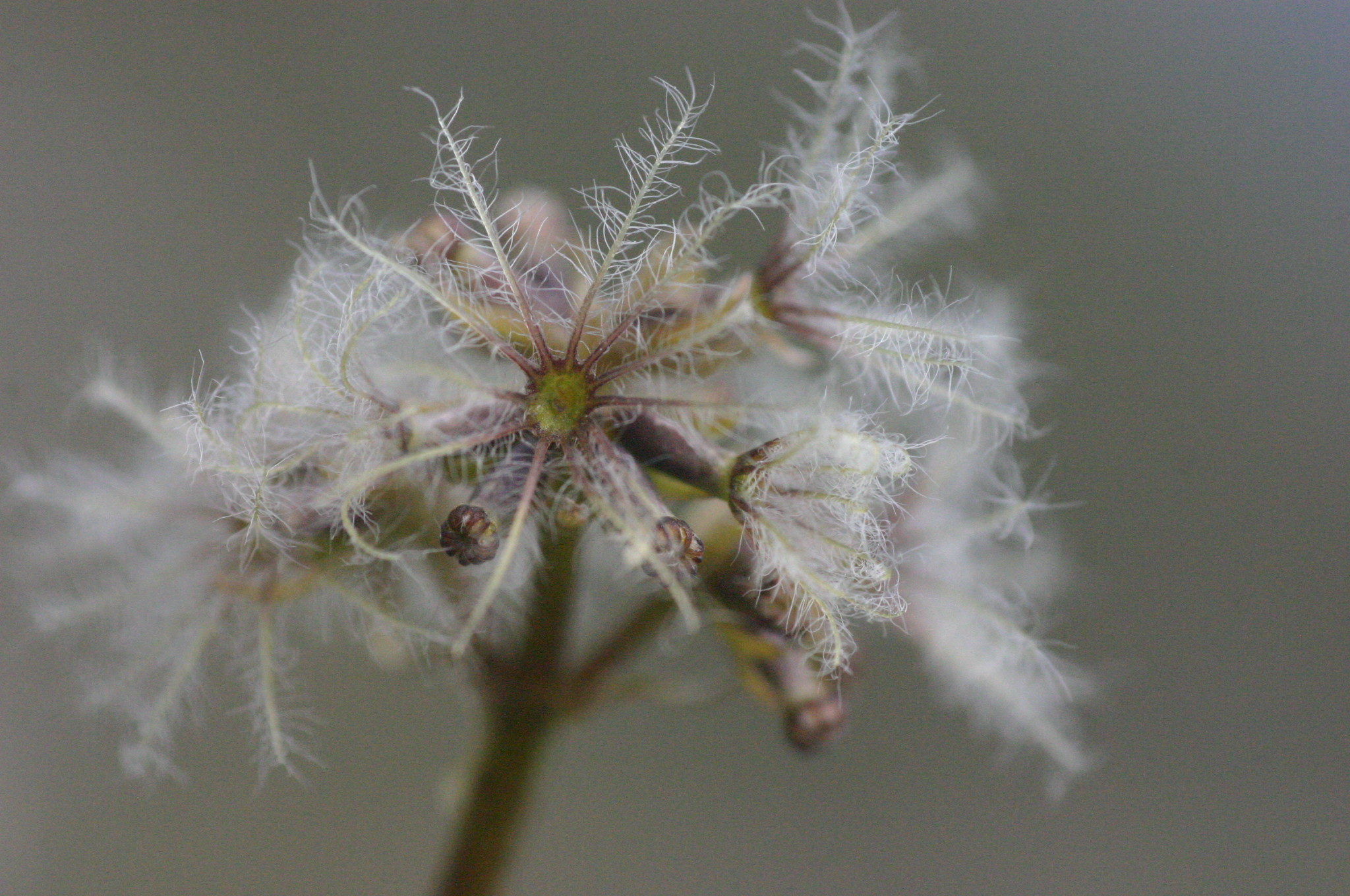

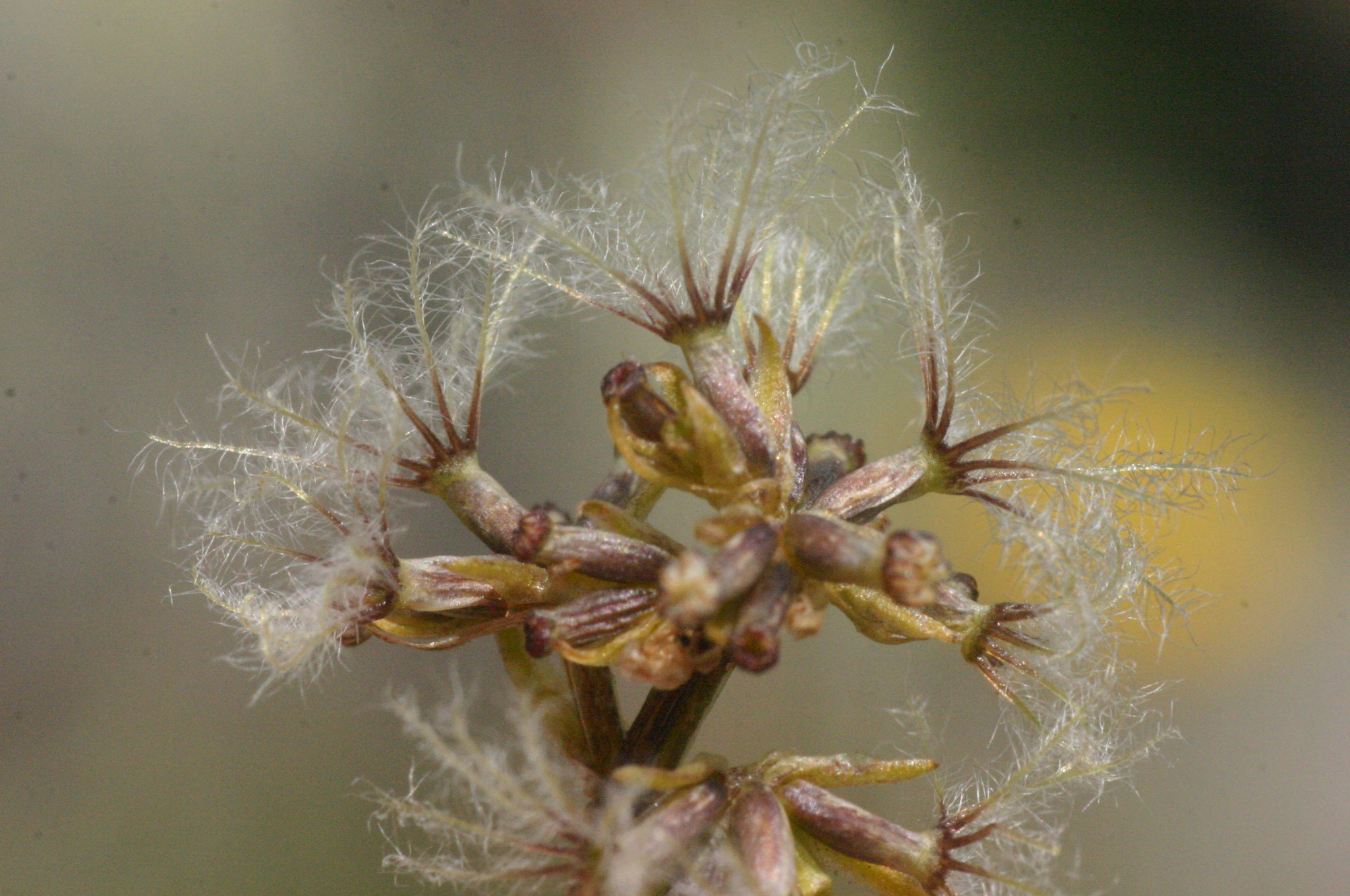

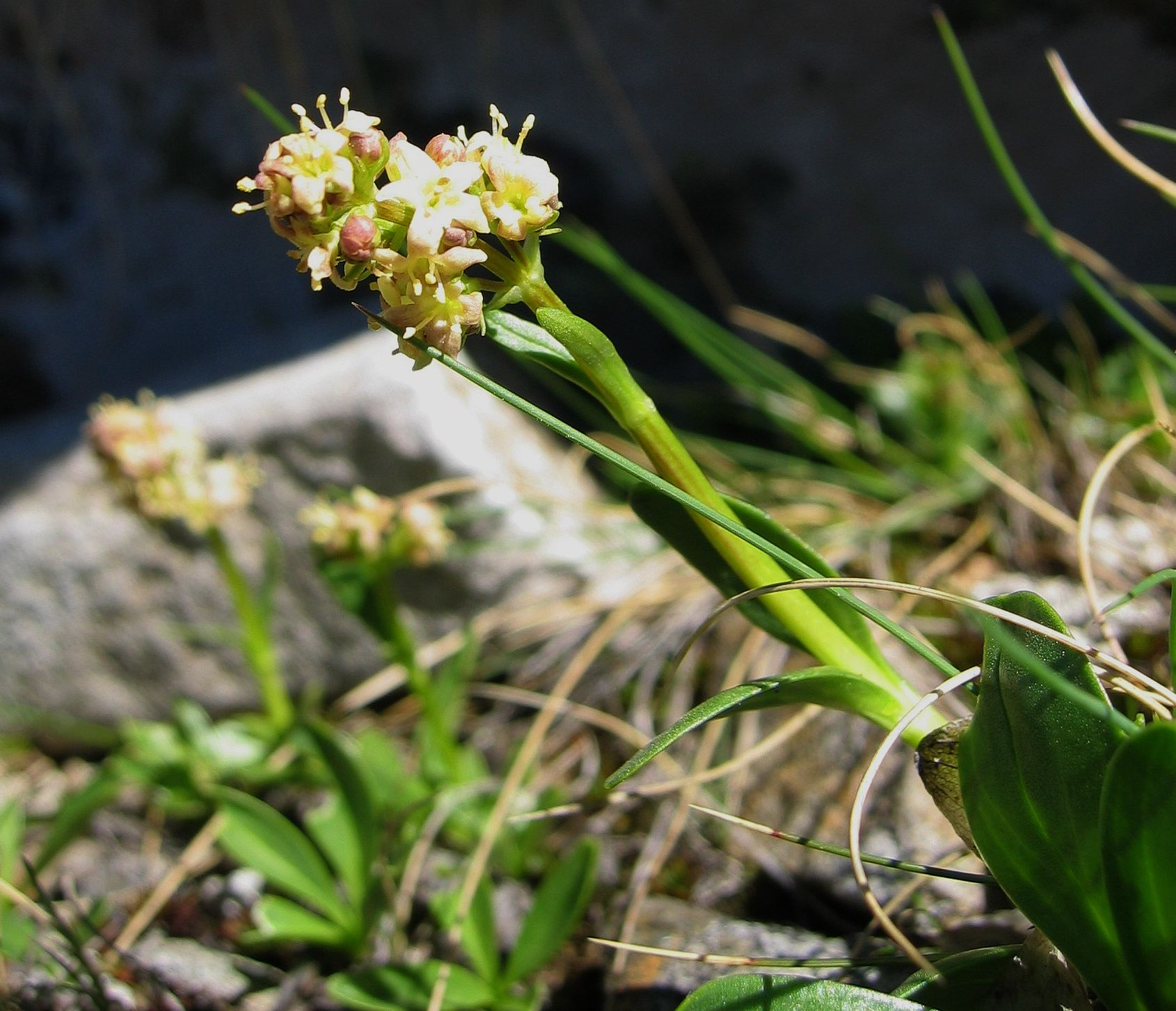
