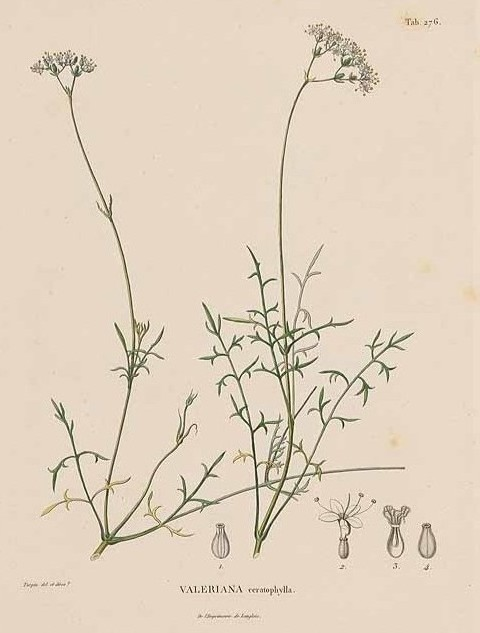
- Illustrated by Pierre Jean François Turpin

Scientific classification
- Kingdom: Plantae
- Clade: Tracheophytes
- Clade: Angiosperms
- Clade: Eudicots
- Clade: Asterids
- Order: Dipsacales
- Family: Caprifoliaceae
- Genus: Valeriana
- Species: V. ceratophylla

Binomial name
- Valeriana ceratophylla Kunth

Synonyms
- Valeriana dichotoma; Valeriana napus; Valeriana ramosissima

= Valeriana ceratophylla =

Plant species in the honeysuckle family

Valeriana ceratophylla, also known as raíz de gato, is a herbaceous plant that is native to Mexico. It is species of valerian in the honeysuckle family.

== Description ==
Valeriana ceratophylla is a perennial plant that can grow 31 to 60 centimeters (12 to 24 in) tall, but usually not taller than 50 cm (20 in). It grows from a taproot that is round at the top and taping downwards like a turnip to somewhat tapering at the top and often forking. The root can be as much as 20 cm (7.9 in) thick, but more usually is less than 10 cm (3.9 in). The caudex is 2–4 cm long and covered in the remains of leaf bases from past years and the brown stems of the present season.

Most of its leaves are basal leaves, springing directly from the base of the plant, with only occasional leaves on the stems. They are twice divided pinnate leaves like that of a fern. They are attached by leaf stems that measures 1–7 cm long while the blade of the leaf is 8–21.5 cm (3.1–8.5 in) long and 2–3.5 cm (0.8–1.4 in) wide.

The fused flower petals are form a bell shape about 5 millimeters long. They are white to somewhat pink in color and have silky hairs in the throat of the flower. It can flower as early as June or as late as September.

== Taxonomy ==
Valeriana ceratophylla was scientifically described and named by Karl Sigismund Kunth in 1819. It is classified in the genus Valeriana within the family Caprifoliaceae. It has three heterotypic synonyms.

Table of synonyms
Name	Year
Valeriana dichotoma DC.	1830
Valeriana napus Lindl.	1840
Valeriana ramosissima M.Martens & Galeotti	1844

=== Names ===
In Spanish Valeriana ceratophylla is known as raíz de gato or "cat's claw". It is also known as mazatates, raíz del oso, acuares, raíz de valeriana, or ucuares.

== Range and habitat ==
In central Mexico it grows in the states of Mexico City, the State of Mexico, Morelos, and Puebla, and it only absent from Tlaxcala. It is also recorded in the northeastern states of Guanajuato, Hidalgo, Querétaro, and San Luis Potosí, and also to the east in Veracruz on the Gulf of Mexico. To the southwest it only grows in Guerrero and Oaxaca. It grows in open, dry areas and is often found growing on disturbed ground.
