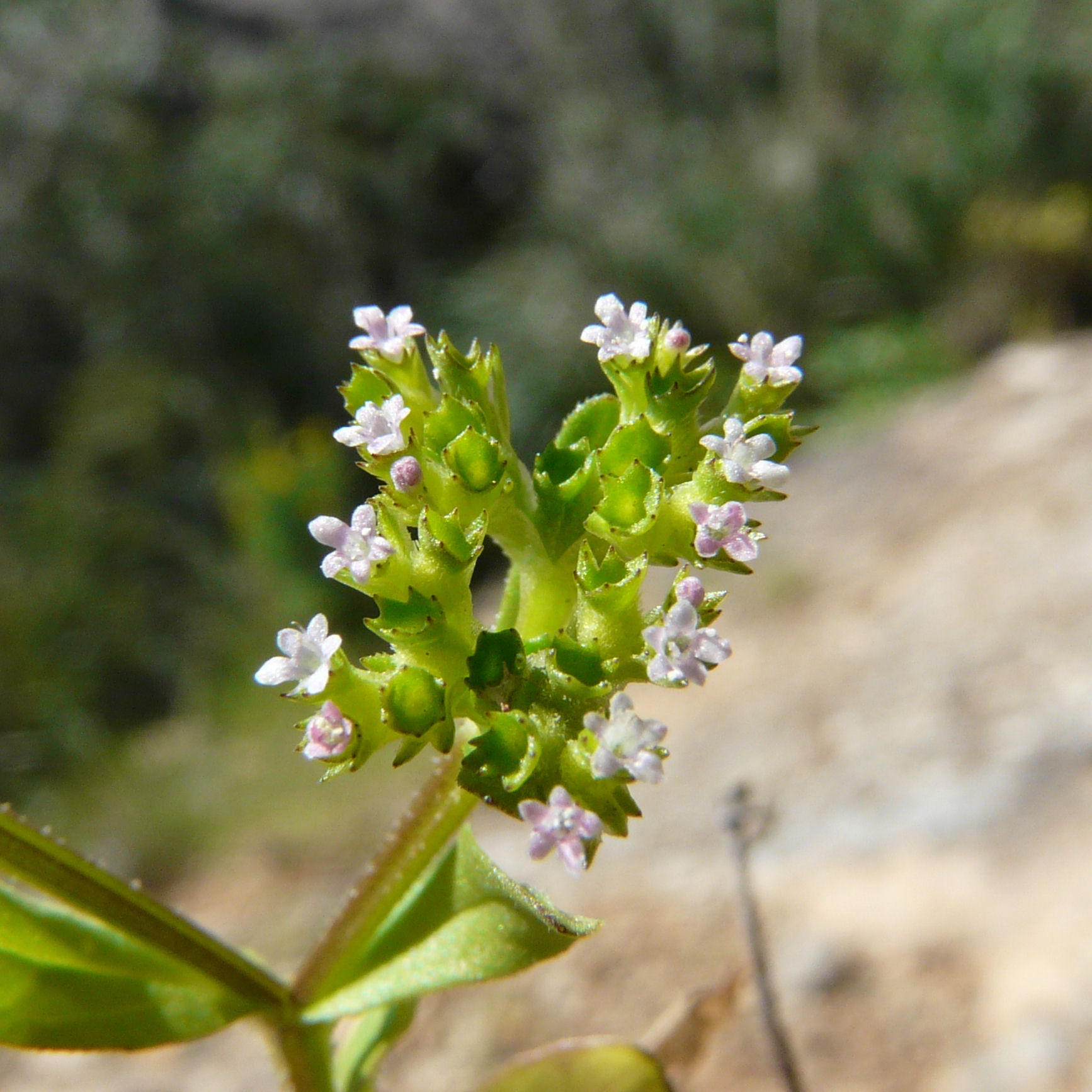

Scientific classification
- Kingdom: Plantae
- Clade: Tracheophytes
- Clade: Angiosperms
- Clade: Eudicots
- Clade: Asterids
- Order: Dipsacales
- Family: Caprifoliaceae
- Genus: Valeriana
- Species: V. eriocarpa

Binomial name
- Valeriana eriocarpa (Desv.) Christenh. & Byng (2018)

Synonyms
- Fedia eriocarpa (Desv.) Roem. & Schult. (1817); Valerianella eriocarpa Desv. (1809)

= Valeriana eriocarpa =

Species of plant

Valeriana eriocarpa is a species of flowering plant in the family Caprifoliaceae. It is an annual native to western and southern Europe, northwestern Turkey, and north Africa.

== Sources ==
This article incorporates text from a free content work. Licensed under CC0 (license statement/permission). Text taken from Valerianella eriocarpa. Encyclopedia of Life.
