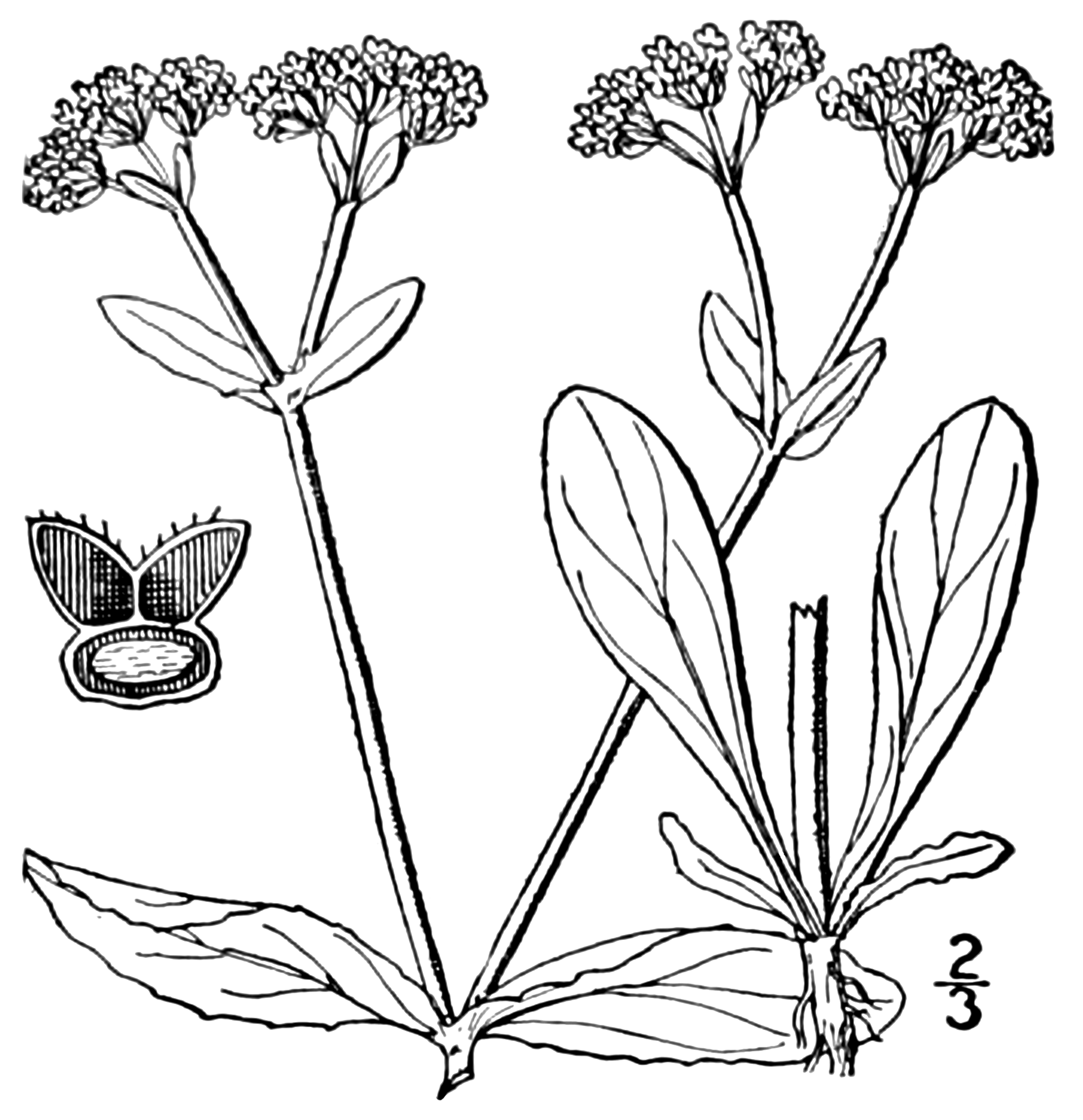

Conservation status
- Apparently Secure (NatureServe)

Scientific classification
- Kingdom: Plantae
- Clade: Tracheophytes
- Clade: Angiosperms
- Clade: Eudicots
- Clade: Asterids
- Order: Dipsacales
- Family: Caprifoliaceae
- Genus: Valeriana
- Species: V. umbilicata

Binomial name
- Valeriana umbilicata (Sull.) Christenh. & Byng (2018)

Synonyms
- Fedia radiata var. umbilicata (Sull.) Porter; Fedia umbilicata Sull.; Valerianella radiata var. umbilicata (Sull.); Valerianella umbilicata (Sull.) Alph.Wood; Valerianella woodsiana var. umbilicata (Sull.) A.Gray

= Valeriana umbilicata =

Species of plant

Valeriana umbilicata (synonym Valerianella umbilicata), known by the common name navel cornsalad. It is a dicot, annual plant in the flowering plant family Caprifoliaceae. It is native to the Eastern North America and some parts of Canada and has no known uses other than being edible.

== Description ==
Navel cornsalad is an herbaceous succulent annual plant. It has dichotomously branched leaves that are attached along the stem rather than attached at the base. The leaves are spatulate, or "spoon-like" and are attached directly to the stem without a petiole. It can be anywhere between 3-6 dm tall. The petals are either white or pink to red, and range from 2–5 mm long. The pollen bearing organs project out strongly. They are rare and found in fields, roadsides, and waste places.

== Distribution and habitat ==
Valeriana umbilicata is native to CAN N and L48 N (lower 48 states) and has a known distribution that includes specimens from the central Piedmont to the southern Mountains. This species appears to be absent from the northern mountains and the Piedmont foothills. V. umbilicata is rare and lives in damp and open environments. It thrives in disturbed areas such as damp meadows, bottomland openings, roadsides, marshes, and fields.

Human disturbances such as development, deforestation, and changes must be avoided by the Valerianella umbilicata species. This species has minimal comprehensive habitat information.

== Uses ==
This species of cornsalad is not known to be used by wildlife and has no known medical uses, but it can be eaten as a vegetable.

== Conservation status ==
The global ranking on conservation status is G4-G5. There is no US status, however individual states have included a state rank. In Michigan, V. umbilicata is threatened (T) and legally protected by the state and holds a state rank of S2 - Imperiled. North Carolina's state rank is SH - Endangered. New Jersey's state rank is SH - Endangered.
