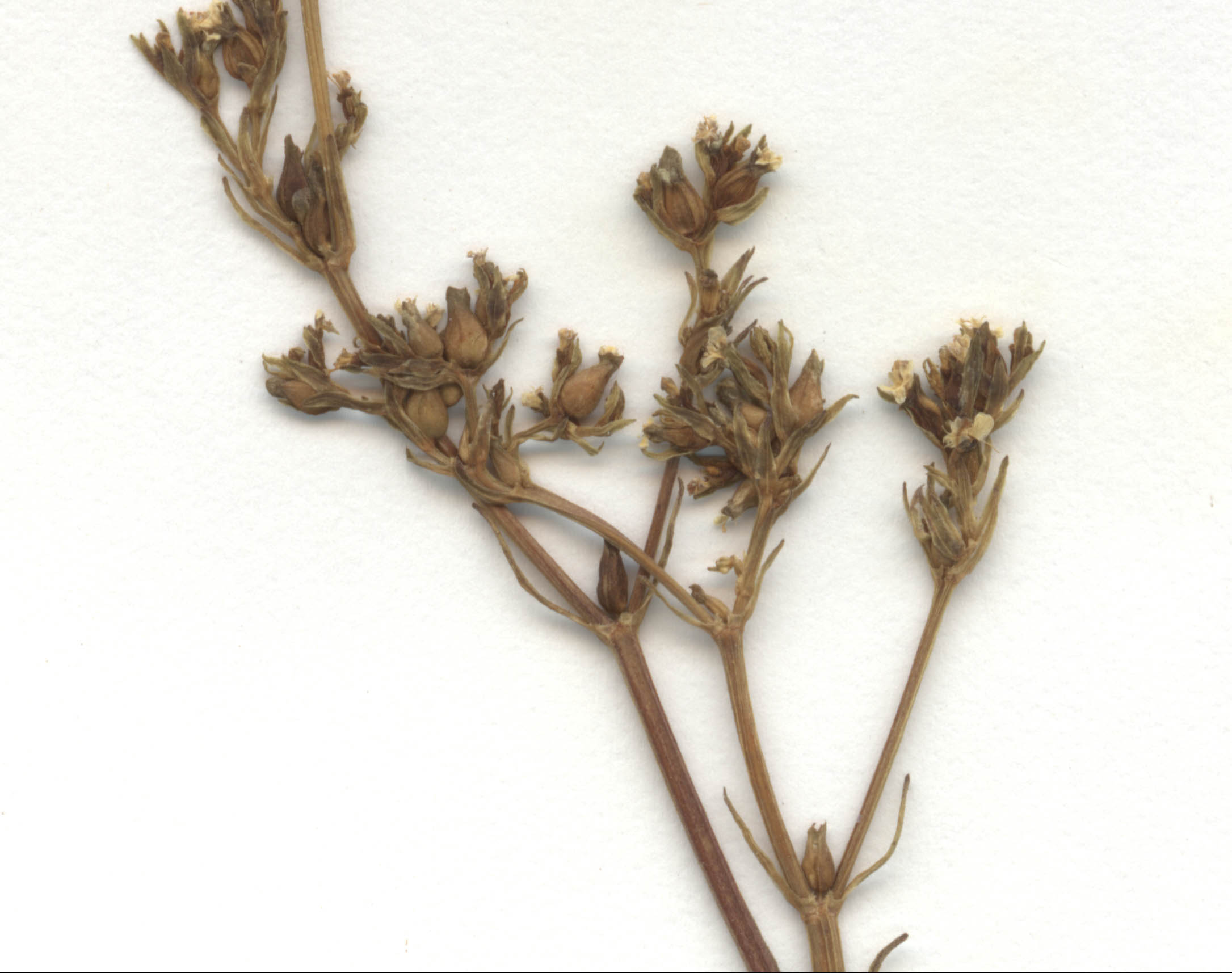

Scientific classification
- Kingdom: Plantae
- Clade: Tracheophytes
- Clade: Angiosperms
- Clade: Eudicots
- Clade: Asterids
- Order: Dipsacales
- Family: Caprifoliaceae
- Genus: Valeriana
- Species: V. dentata

Binomial name
- Valeriana dentata (L.) All. (1785)

Synonyms
- List: Fedia auricula (DC.) Mert. & W.D.J.Koch (1823); Fedia auricula var. dasycarpa Rchb. (1823); Fedia auricula var. leiocarpa Rchb. (1823); Fedia auriculata f. integrifolia Rchb. (1823); Fedia auriculata f. pinnatifida Rchb. (1823); Fedia dasycarpa Steven (1809); Fedia dentata (L.) Bernh. (1800); Fedia dentata var. dasycarpa (Steven) Rchb. (1823); Fedia dentata var. eriosperma Wallr. (1822); Fedia dentata var. gracilis Gaudin (1828); Fedia dentata var. leiocarpa Rchb. (1823); Fedia dentata var. leiosperma Wallr. (1822); Fedia dentata f. pinnatifida Rchb. (1823); Fedia dentata var. vera Soy.-Will. (1833); Fedia microcarpa Rchb. (1824); Fedia mixta Vahl (1805); Fedia morisonii Spreng. (1813); Fedia rugulosa Hornem. (1815), nom. illeg.; Masema auricula (DC.) Dulac (1867); Masema dentatum (L.) Dulac (1867); Odontocarpa dentata (L.) Raf. (1840); Valeriana auricula (DC.) Tardent (1841); Valeriana locusta var. dentata L. (1753) (basionym); Valeriana locusta subsp. dentata (L.) Ehrh. (1782); Valerianella auricula DC. (1815); Valerianella dasycarpa (Steven) Link (1821); Valerianella dentata (L.) Pollich (1776); Valerianella dentata var. dasycarpa Rchb. (1831), nom. superfl.; Valerianella dentata var. eriocarpa Ewart (1931); Valerianella dentata subsp. eriosperma (Wallr.) Holub (1978); Valerianella dentata var. leiocarpa (Rchb.) Bég. (1903), pro syn.; Valerianella dentata var. leiosperma (Wallr.) Fiori (1903); Valerianella dentata f. leiosperma (Wallr.) Kojić (1973); Valerianella dentata var. macrocarpa (Velen.) Ančev, Delip. & M.Popova (1995); Valerianella dentata var. serratifolia Gray (1821 publ. 1822); Valerianella godayana Fanlo (1975); Valerianella hispidiuscula Mérat (1843); Valerianella lingulata C.Presl (1845); Valerianella locusta var. dentata L. in Sp. Pl.: 34 (1753); Valerianella morisonii (Spreng.) DC. in Prodr. 4: 627 (1830); Valerianella morisonii var. dasycarpa (Steven) Lange (1861); Valerianella morisonii subsp. dentata (L.) P.Fourn. (1938), nom. superfl.; Valerianella morisonii var. lasiocarpa Boiss. (1875); Valerianella morisonii var. leiocarpa DC. (1830); Valerianella morisonii var. macrocarpa Velen. (1895); Valerianella otodonta Pomel (1874); Valerianella pubescens Mérat (1812); Valerianella rimosa var. auricula (DC.) Rouy & E.G.Camus (1903)

= Valeriana dentata =

Species of flowering plant

Valeriana dentata is a species of flowering plant belonging to the family Caprifoliaceae. It is an annual native to North Africa, Europe, and parts of western and central Asia east to the western Himalayas.
