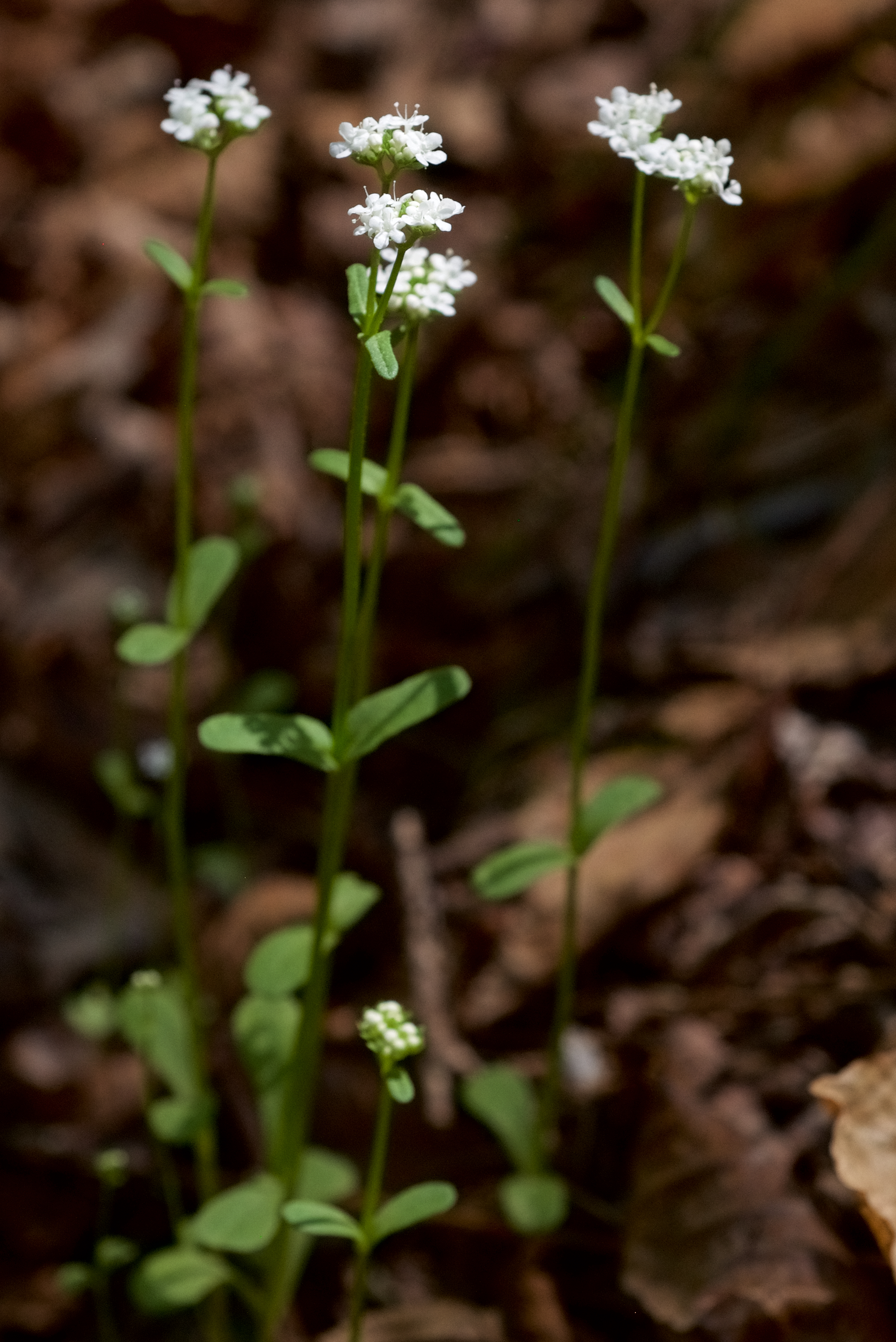

Conservation status
- Vulnerable (NatureServe)

Scientific classification
- Kingdom: Plantae
- Clade: Tracheophytes
- Clade: Angiosperms
- Clade: Eudicots
- Clade: Asterids
- Order: Dipsacales
- Family: Caprifoliaceae
- Genus: Valeriana
- Species: V. arkansana

Binomial name
- Valeriana arkansana Christenh. & Byng (2018)

Synonyms
- Valerianella palmeri Dyal (1938)

= Valeriana arkansana =

Species of flowering plant

Valeriana arkansana (synonym Valerianella palmeri) is a species of flowering plant in the honeysuckle family known by the common name Palmer's cornsalad. It is found in Arkansas and Oklahoma in the United States.
