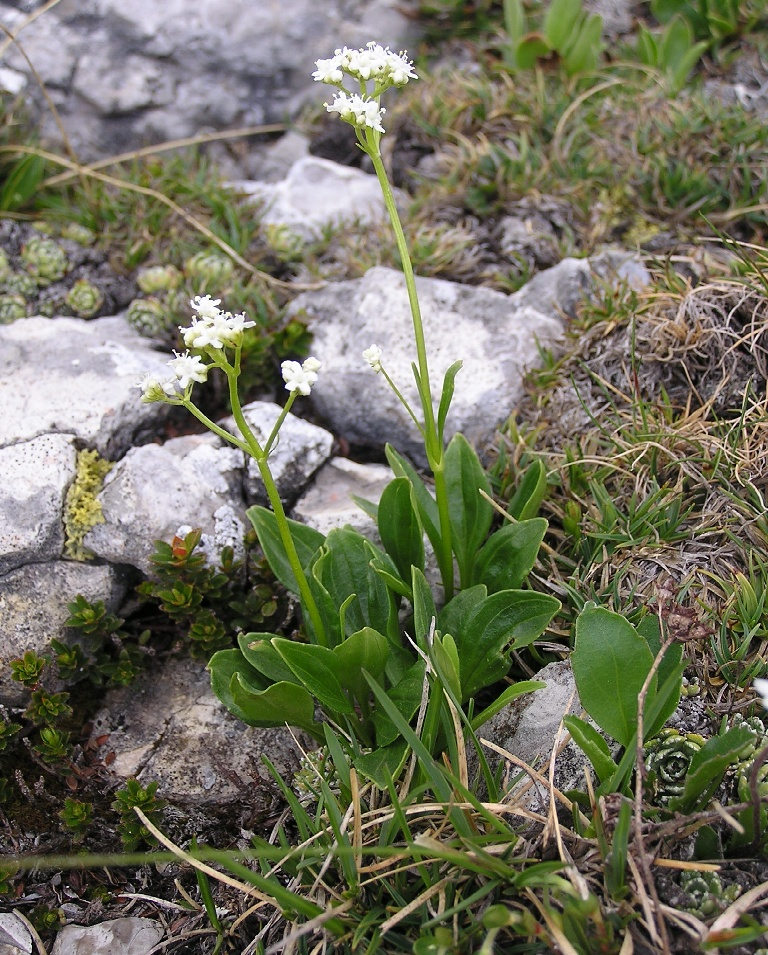

Scientific classification
- Kingdom: Plantae
- Clade: Tracheophytes
- Clade: Angiosperms
- Clade: Eudicots
- Clade: Asterids
- Order: Dipsacales
- Family: Caprifoliaceae
- Genus: Valeriana
- Species: V. saxatilis

Binomial name
- Valeriana saxatilis L.

Subspecies
- Valeriana saxatilis subsp. pancicii (Halácsy & Bald.) Ockendon; Valeriana saxatilis subsp. saxatilis

= Valeriana saxatilis =

Species of flowering plant

Valeriana saxatilis, commonly known as rock valerian, is a species of flowering plant in the family Caprifoliaceae. It is a perennial or rhizomatous geophyte native to the east-central and eastern Alps, northern Apennines, and southern Dinaric Alps of Albania, Austria, Germany, Italy, Montenegro, Slovenia, and Switzerland.

Two subspecies are accepted.

- Valeriana saxatilis subsp. pancicii (Halácsy & Bald.) Ockendon (synonyms Valeriana celtica subsp. pancicii (Halácsy & Bald.) Weberling and Valeriana pancicii Halácsy & Bald.) – southern Dinaric Alps of Montenegro and Albania
- Valeriana saxatilis subsp. saxatilis – east-central and eastern Alps and northern Apennine mountains of Austria, Germany, Italy, Slovenia, and Switzerland
