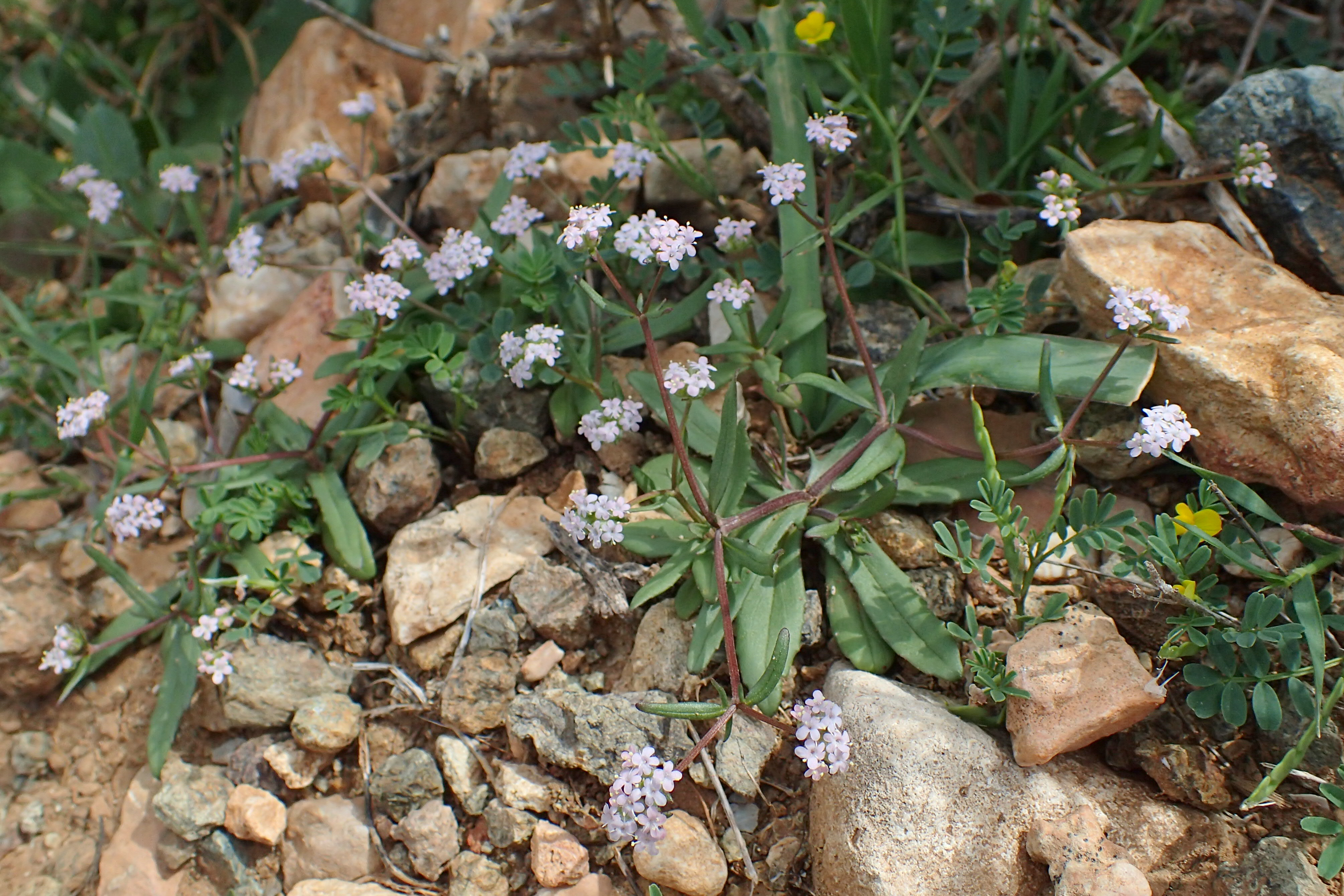
- Habit
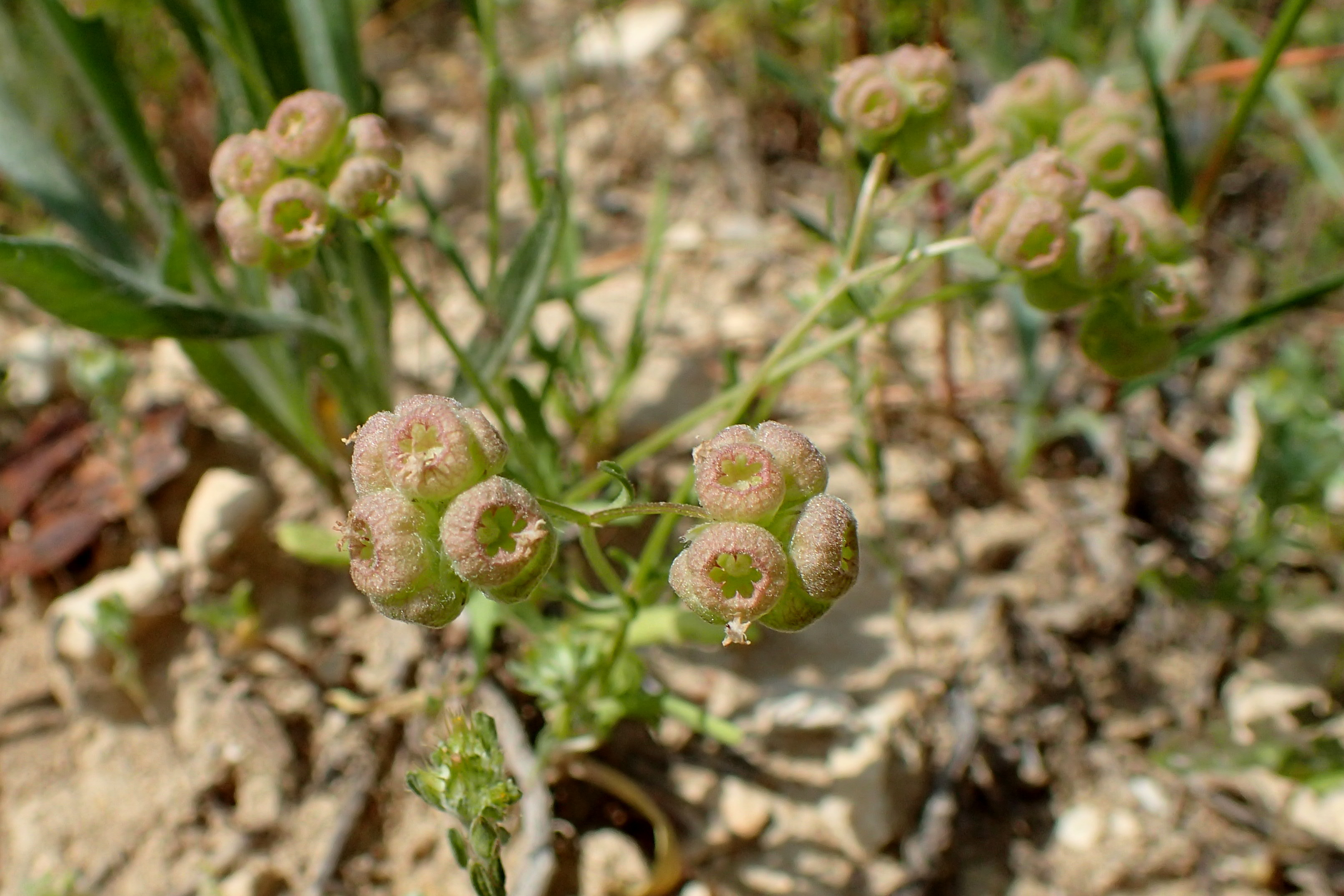
- In Cyprus

Scientific classification
- Kingdom: Plantae
- Clade: Tracheophytes
- Clade: Angiosperms
- Clade: Eudicots
- Clade: Asterids
- Order: Dipsacales
- Family: Caprifoliaceae
- Genus: Valeriana
- Species: V. vesicaria

Binomial name
- Valeriana vesicaria (L.) Mill.

Synonyms
- Fedia vesicaria (L.) Mirb.; Valeriana locusta var. vesicaria L.; Valerianella vesicaria (L.) Moench

= Valeriana vesicaria =

Species of plant

Valeriana vesicaria is a species of flowering plant in the family Caprifoliaceae, native to the central Mediterranean and western Asia, extinct in Algeria, and introduced in Argentina. A somewhat ruderal species, it is a minor weed of cultivation.
