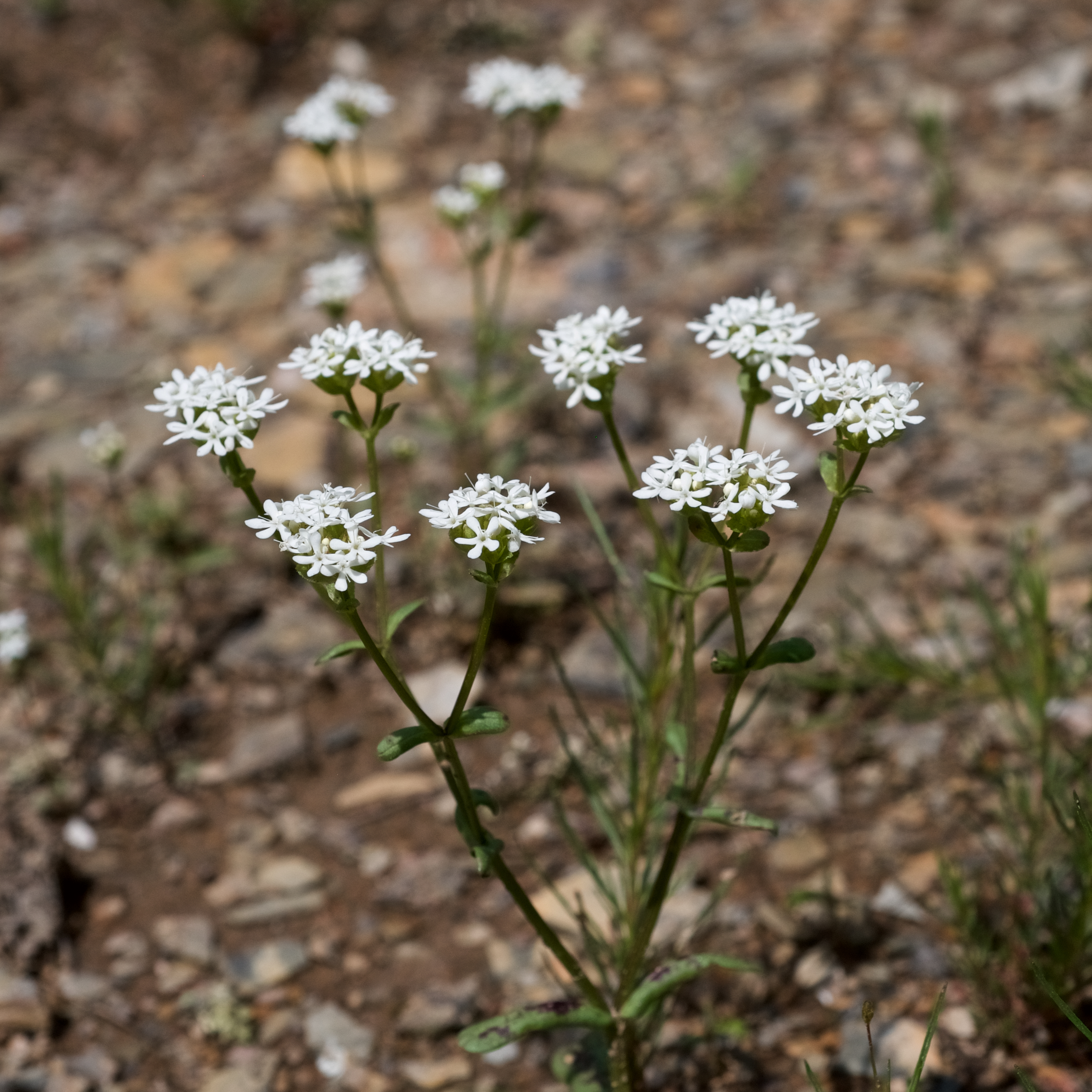

Conservation status
- Imperiled (NatureServe)

Scientific classification
- Kingdom: Plantae
- Clade: Tracheophytes
- Clade: Angiosperms
- Clade: Eudicots
- Clade: Asterids
- Order: Dipsacales
- Family: Caprifoliaceae
- Genus: Valeriana
- Species: V. nuttallii

Binomial name
- Valeriana nuttallii (Torr. & A.Gray) Christenh. & Byng (2018)

Synonyms
- Fedia nuttallii Torr. & A.Gray (1841); Plectritis spathulata Nutt. (1841); Siphonella nuttallii (Torr. & A.Gray) Small (1903); Valerianella nuttallii (Torr. & A.Gray) Walp. (1843); Valerianella nuttallii f. compacta Egg.Ware (1983)

= Valeriana nuttallii =

Nuttall's cornsalad

Species of flowering plant

Valeriana nuttallii, or Nuttall's cornsalad, is a small dicot annual plant of the family Caprifoliaceae which can be found growing within the United States in areas of Oklahoma and Arkansas.
