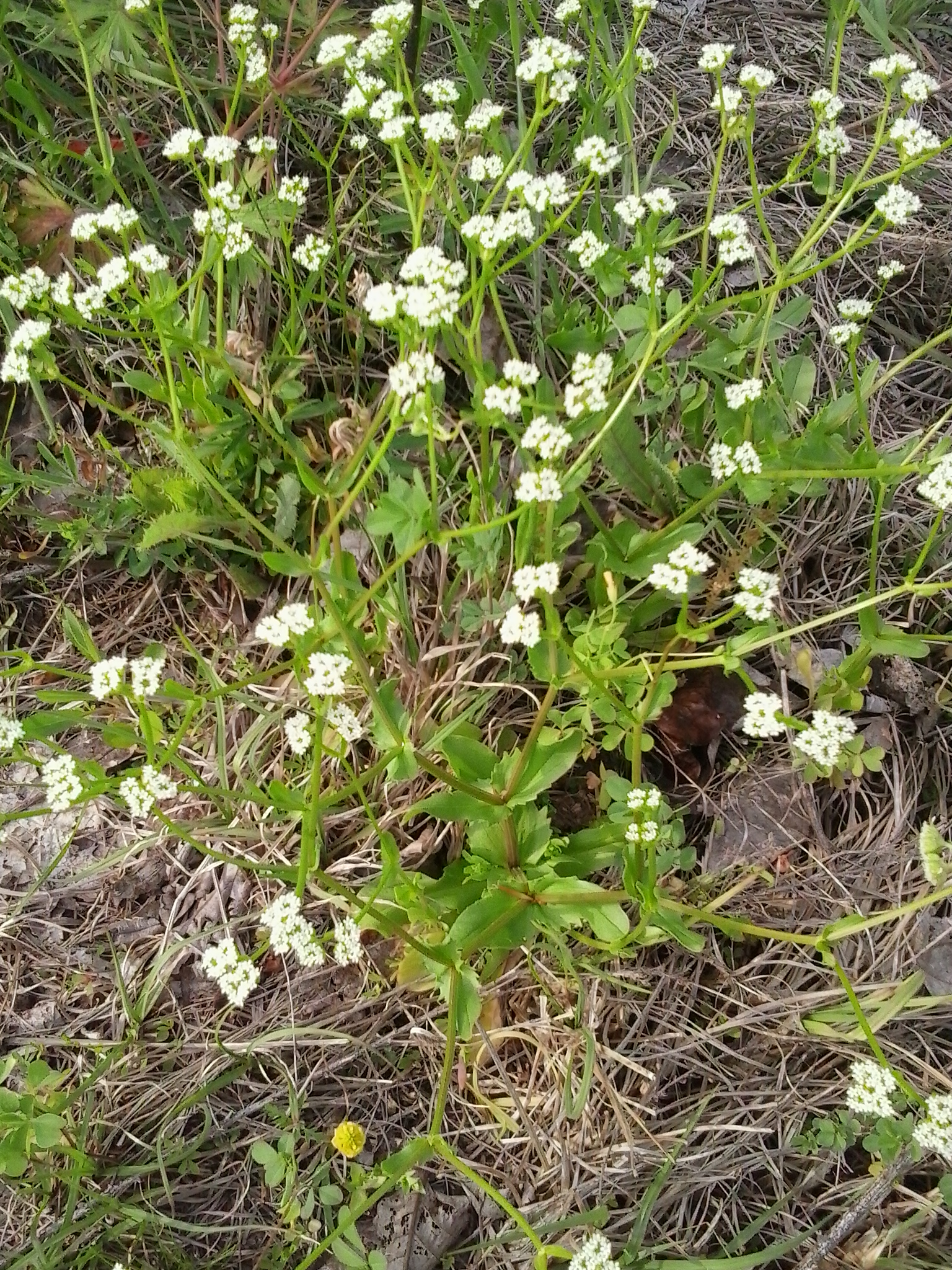

Scientific classification
- Kingdom: Plantae
- Clade: Tracheophytes
- Clade: Angiosperms
- Clade: Eudicots
- Clade: Asterids
- Order: Dipsacales
- Family: Caprifoliaceae
- Genus: Valeriana
- Species: V. woodsiana

Binomial name
- Valeriana woodsiana (Torr. & A.Gray) Christenh. & Byng

Synonyms
- Fedia radiata (L.) Michx. (1803); Fedia woodsiana Torr. & A.Gray (1841); Valeriana locusta var. radiata L. (1753); Valeriana radiata (L.) Willd.(1797); Valeriana valerianella Christenh. & Byng (2018); Valerianella radiata (L.) Dufr. (1811); Valerianella radiata f. demareei Egg.Ware (1983); Valerianella radiata var. fernaldii Dyal (1938); Valerianella radiata f. fernaldii (Dyal) Egg.Ware (1983); Valerianella radiata var. missouriensis Dyal (1938); Valerianella radiata f. parviflora (Dyal) Egg.Ware (1983); Valerianella woodsiana (Torr. & A.Gray) Walp. (1843)

= Valeriana woodsiana =

Species of flowering plant in the honeysuckle family

Valeriana woodsiana (synonym Valerianella radiata), common name beaked cornsalad, is a plant native to the United States. It is an annual self pollinating flowering plant and besides being edible there are no known uses. Valerianella radiata flowers from April to May.

== Description ==
Valeriana woodsiana typically grows to a height of 0.6 m (2 ft). Flowers are perfect. It has 5 white flower petals that are arranged bilaterally symmetrical with fused sepals. The leaves are simple, entire, and toothed with opposite arrangement of two leaves per node on stem. It has 3 stamens, one pistil with three carpels, an inferior ovary with 3 locules and one ovule per locule, slightly 3-lobed stigmas and produces dry fruit 2–2.5 mm long. Valerianella radiata has a corolla length of less than 2 mm. The fruit is usually yellowish and glabrous to finely pubescent and the fertile cells are slightly narrower than sterile cells. A groove forms between the narrow and fertile sides of the fruit. It is a self-fertile plant due to having both male and female organs. Stems are hollow and ascend to erect, dichotomously branching (an important diagnostic character), angled, and glabrous to sparse pubescence on stem wing margins. Basal leaves are sessile, short-petiolate, spatulate, obovate with bases fused around the stem, glabrous along margins and midvein of the undersurface. Inflorescences are clusters that are small, dense, and usually paired on branch tips that have lanceolate bracts to narrowly elliptic.

== Distribution and habitat ==
Valeriana woodsiana is native to the deciduous forest regions of the eastern United States. This species is commonly found in creek beds, roadsides, ditches, clearings, hilltops, and pasture lands. Valeriana woodsiana can be found in areas ranging from moderate shade to full sunlight exposure. It may be present in Japan as an introduced plant.

== Conservation status ==
It is listed as a special concern and believed extinct in Connecticut, and listed as endangered in New Jersey. It is listed as a weed in other parts of the United States.

== Taxonomy ==
Valeriana woodsiana is an annual, meaning that it grows from a seed, produces seeds, and dies all within a growing season, leaving dormant seeds. Valeriana woodsiana has funnelform flowers which commonly leads to inbreeding. This species has two varieties: var. radiata and var. fernaldii. The species is known by various synonyms including Valerianella radiata, which was originally described by Linnaeus but was later renamed by Pierre Dufresne.

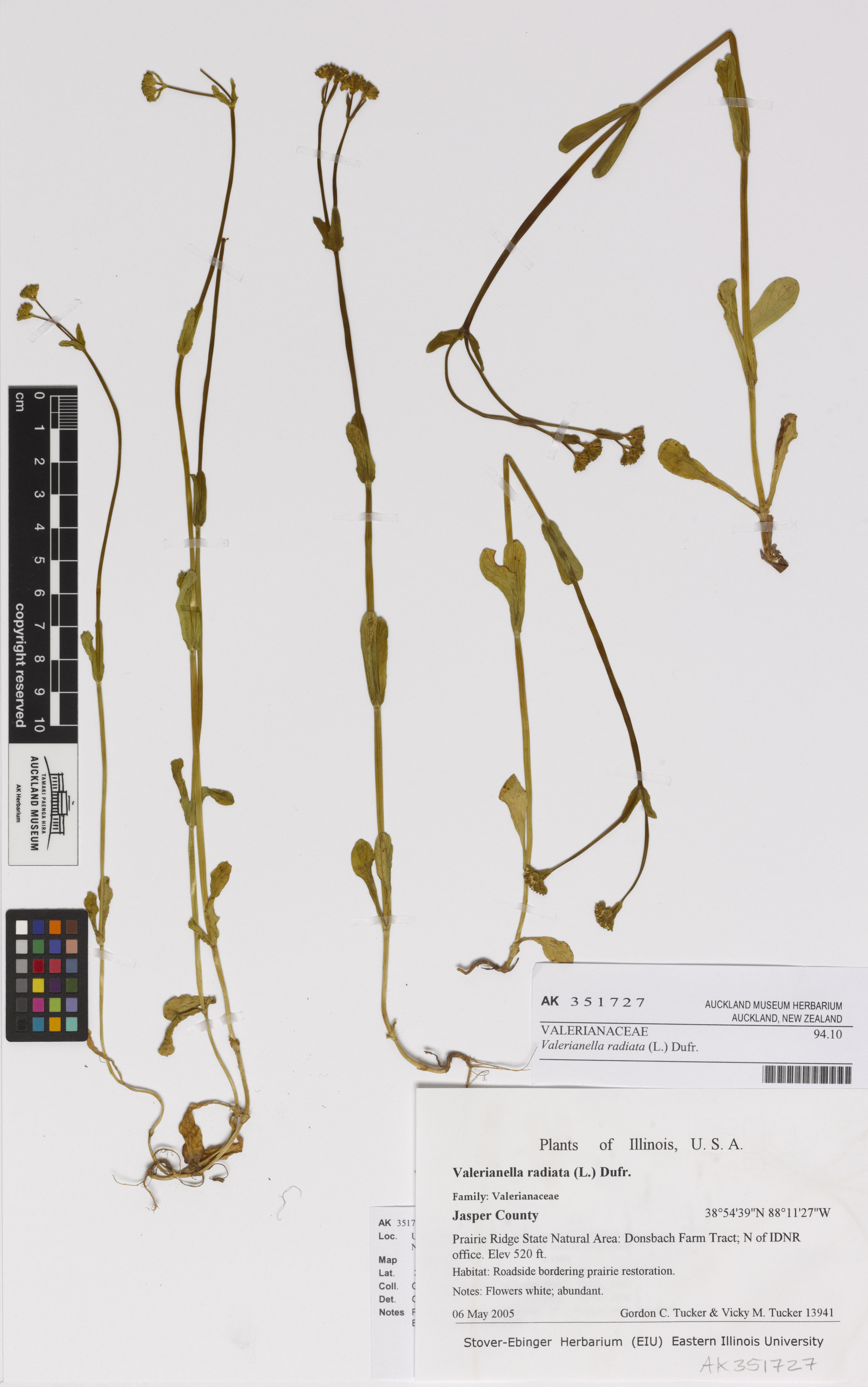
Valerianella radiata herbarium sheet

== Toxicity ==
This plant is not known to be toxic.

== Edibility ==
Young raw leaves and the roots of the plant are edible. Roots of plant are an unlikely food source due to their minuscule size.

== Weed control ==
Valeriana woodsiana is a common weed found in some gardens of the southeastern United States due to suitability in many types of soils and pH levels. Applications of 0.11 kg glyphosate/ha was used to controlled V. woodsiana in non-crop situations.
