= Valeriana extincta =

Conservation status
- Extinct (IUCN 3.1)

Scientific classification
- Kingdom: Plantae
- Clade: Tracheophytes
- Clade: Angiosperms
- Clade: Eudicots
- Clade: Asterids
- Order: Dipsacales
- Family: Caprifoliaceae
- Genus: Valeriana
- Species: †V. extincta

Binomial name
- †Valeriana extincta Christenh. & Byng (2018)

Synonyms
- Valerianella affinis Balf.f. (1882)

Species of flowering plant in the honeysuckle family

Valeriana extincta is an extinct species of flowering plant in the family Caprifoliaceae. It was an annual endemic to Jebel Ma'alih, a mountain in northwestern Socotra, Yemen.
