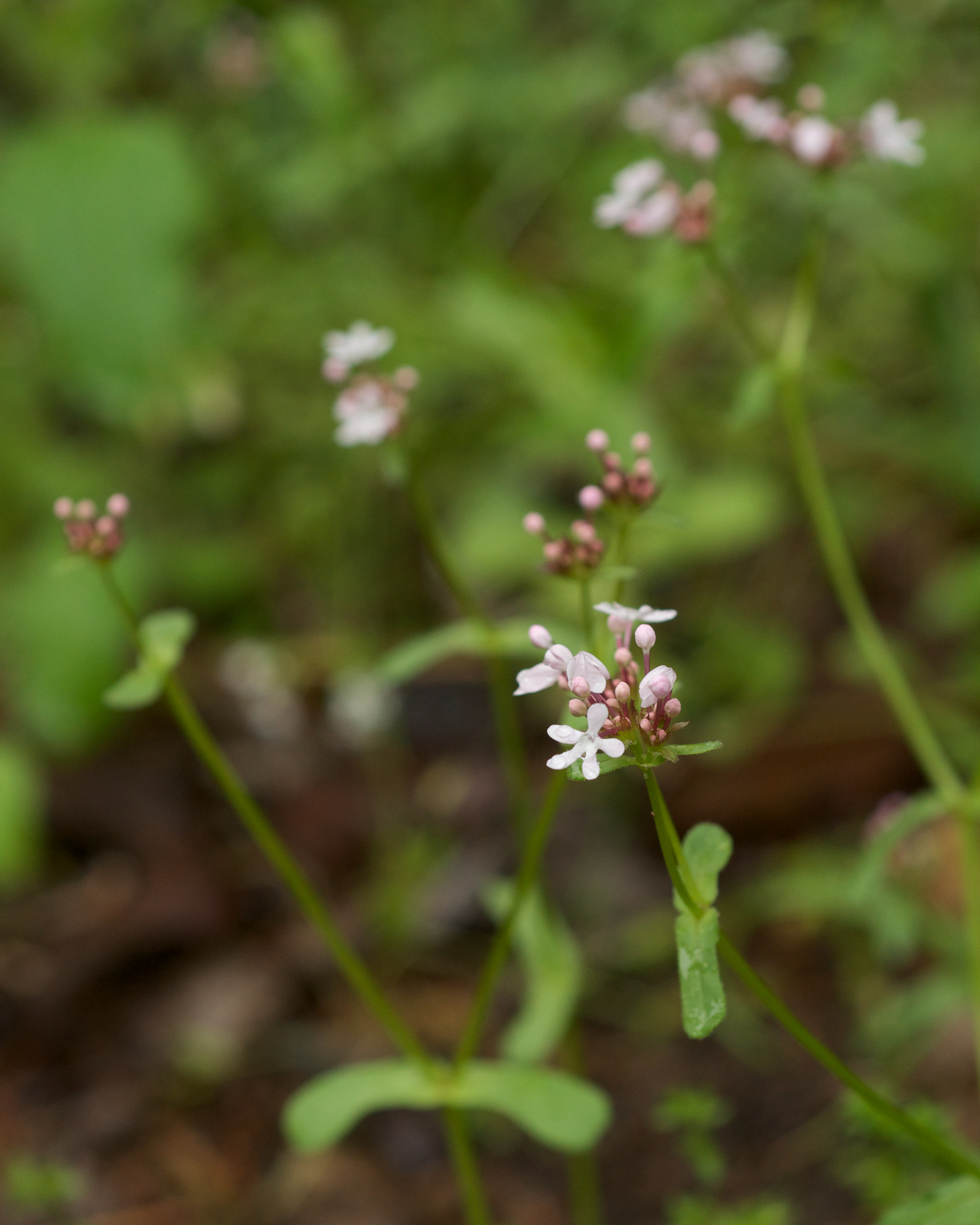

Conservation status
- Vulnerable (NatureServe)

Scientific classification
- Kingdom: Plantae
- Clade: Tracheophytes
- Clade: Angiosperms
- Clade: Eudicots
- Clade: Asterids
- Order: Dipsacales
- Family: Caprifoliaceae
- Genus: Valeriana
- Species: V. ozarkana

Binomial name
- Valeriana ozarkana (Dyal) Christenh. & Byng (2018)

Synonyms
- Valerianella bushii Dyal (1938); Valerianella ozarkana Dyal (1938); Valerianella ozarkana f. bushii (Dyal) Egg.Ware (1983)

= Valeriana ozarkana =

Species of flowering plant in the honeysuckle family

Valeriana ozarkana is a species of flowering plant in the honeysuckle family known by the common names Benjamin Franklin bush or Ozark cornsalad. It is found in Arkansas, Missouri and Oklahoma in the United States.
