= Dipsacaceae =

Family of flowering plants

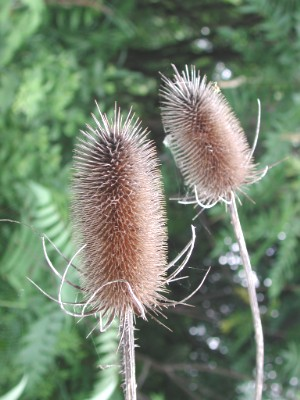
Seedhead of Dipsacus fullonum (wild teasel)

The Dipsacaceae were recognized as a family (the teasel family) of the order Dipsacales containing 350 species of perennial or biennial herbs and shrubs in eleven genera. It was published by Antoine Laurent de Jussieu in his book Genera plantarum on page 194 in 1789.

The family is now regarded as a synonym of the family Caprifoliaceae. Native to most temperate climates, they are found in Europe, Asia, and Africa. Some species of this family have been naturalized in other places. The spikes of the common teasel (pictured) are not particularly spiny and may be quite soft. In some places, the spikes were used in carding wool.

The family has contained these genera;

- Acanthocalyx
- Dipsacus (teasel)
- Knautia
- Scabiosa
- Succisa (devil's bit)
- Succisella
- Morina—also placed in its own family, Morinaceae
- Cephalaria
- Pterocephalus
- Pycnocomon
- Triplostegia
