= D. floribunda =

D. floribunda may refer to:

- Dactyladenia floribunda, a plant native to Africa
- Dalbergia floribunda, a flowering plant
- Dasiphora floribunda, a deciduous shrub
- Delonix floribunda, a legume endemic to Madagascar
- Delosperma floribunda, a succulent plant
- Dillwynia floribunda, a bushy shrub
- Dioscorea floribunda, a diosgenin-rich yam
- Dipelta floribunda, a deciduous shrub
- Diphysa floribunda, a flowering plant
- Dracaena floribunda, a lilioid monocot
- Drimia floribunda, a perennial plant
- Dryandra floribunda, a plant with prickly dark green leaves
- Dyckia floribunda, a plant with stiff and thorny leaves
