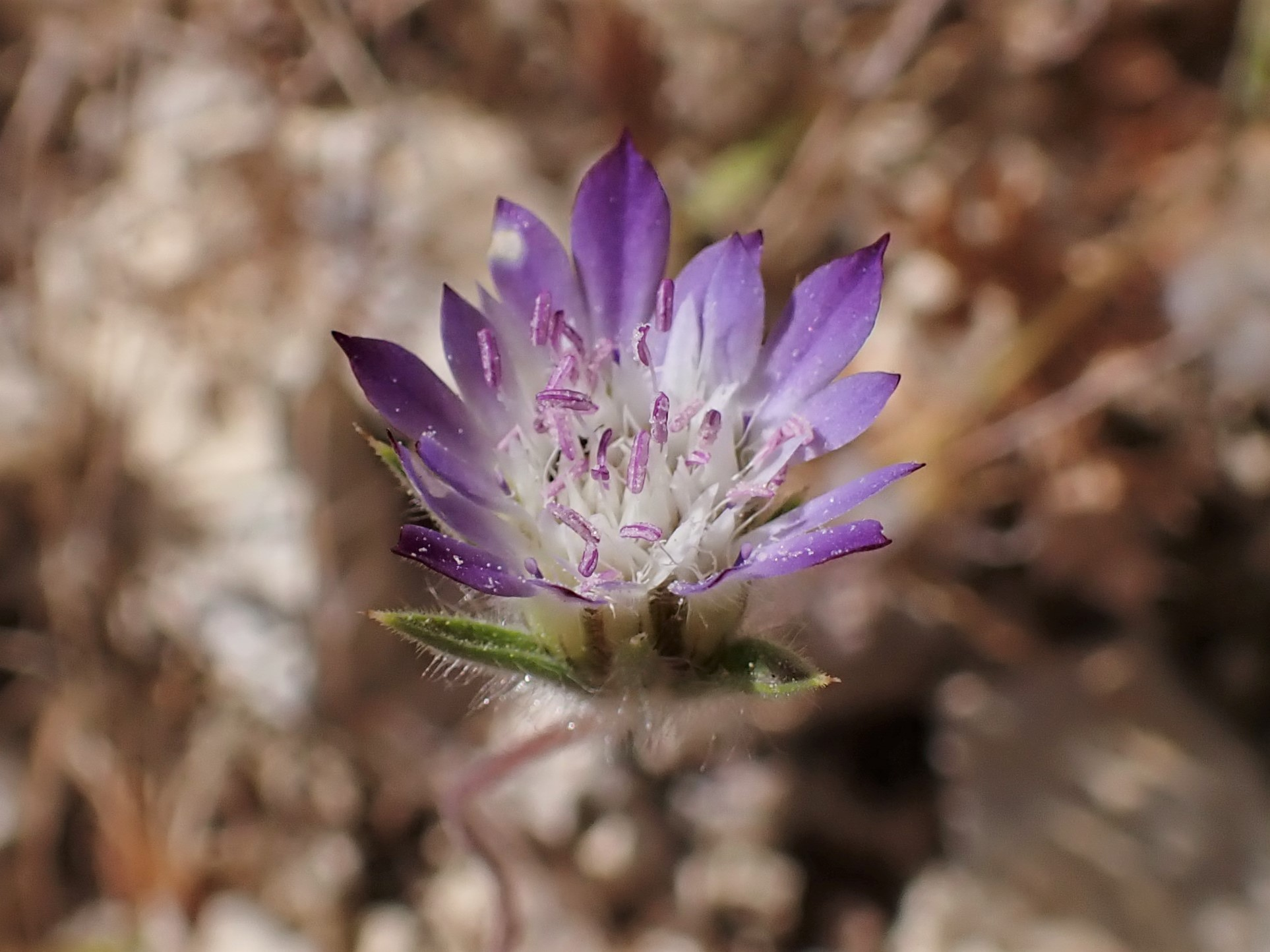

Scientific classification
- Kingdom: Plantae
- Clade: Embryophytes
- Clade: Tracheophytes
- Clade: Spermatophytes
- Clade: Angiosperms
- Clade: Eudicots
- Clade: Asterids
- Order: Dipsacales
- Family: Caprifoliaceae
- Genus: Pterocephalus
- Species: P. brevis

Binomial name
- Pterocephalus brevis Coult.

= Pterocephalus brevis =

Species of flowering plant

Pterocephalus brevis is a species of flowering plant in the family Caprifoliaceae.
