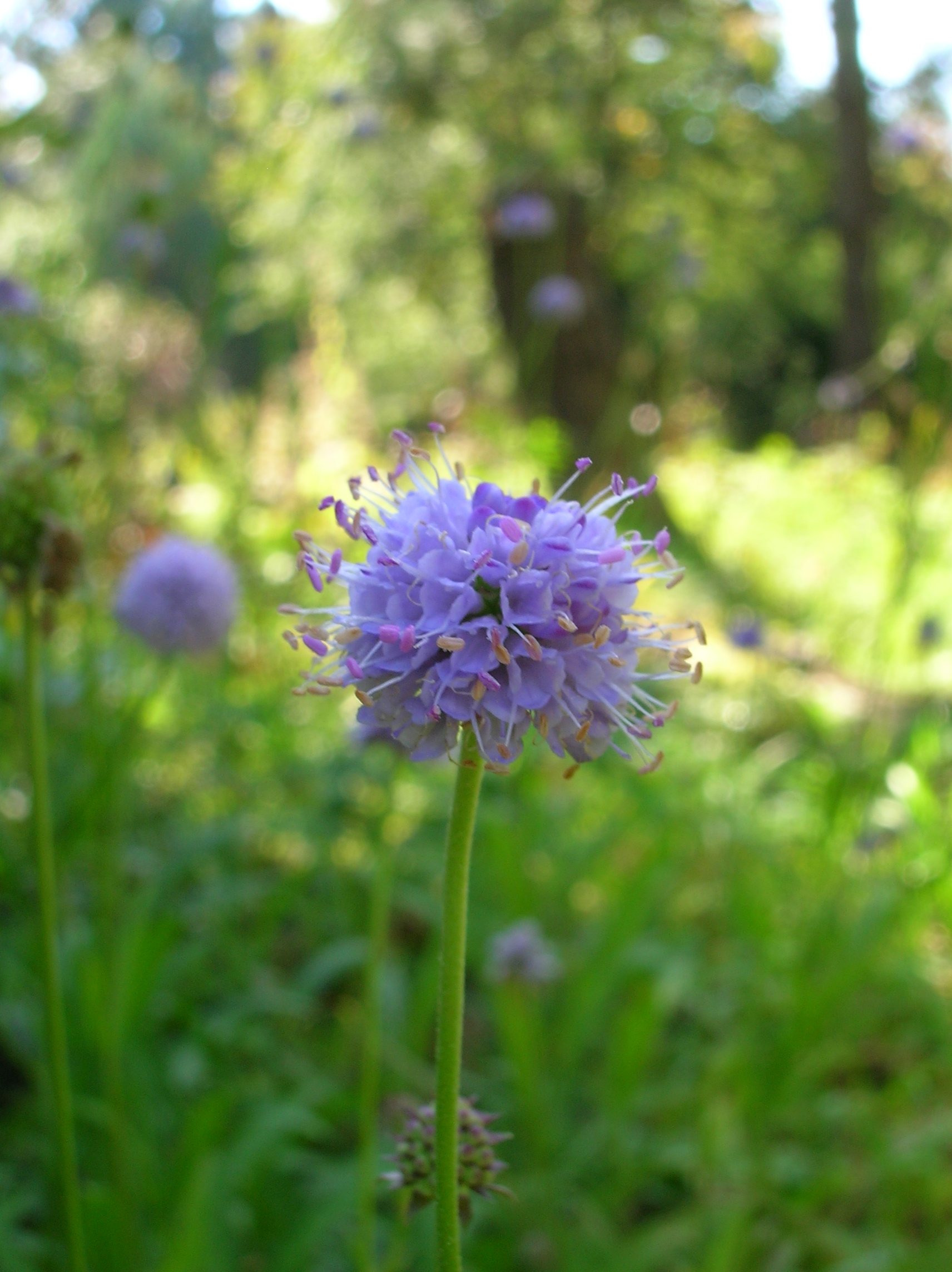

Scientific classification
- Kingdom: Plantae
- Clade: Tracheophytes
- Clade: Angiosperms
- Clade: Eudicots
- Clade: Asterids
- Order: Dipsacales
- Family: Caprifoliaceae
- Genus: Succisella
- Species: S. inflexa

Binomial name
- Succisella inflexa (Kluk) Beck

= Succisella inflexa =

Species of flowering plant

Succisella inflexa is a species of flowering plant belonging to the family Caprifoliaceae.

Its native range is Europe.
