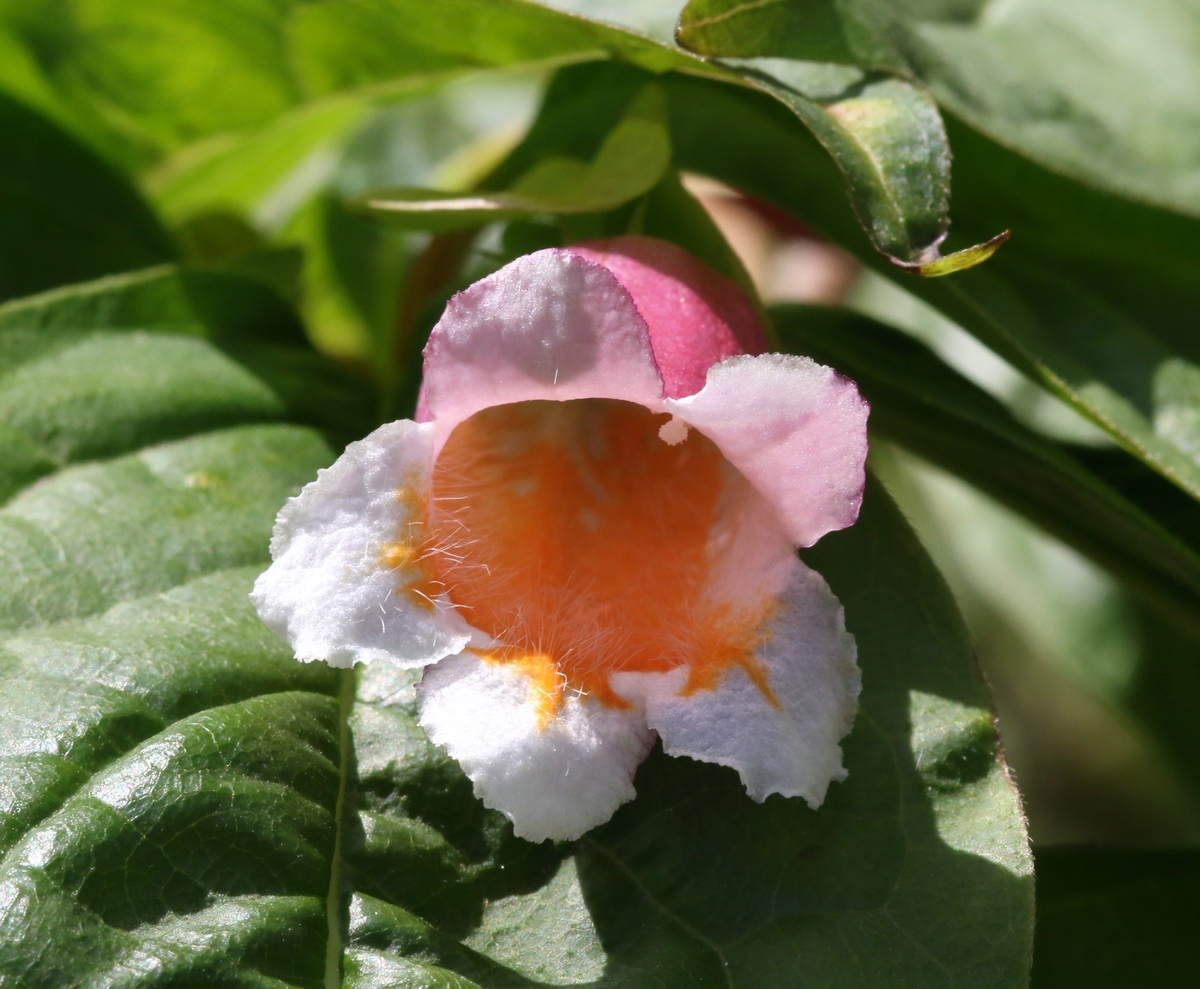

Scientific classification
- Kingdom: Plantae
- Clade: Embryophytes
- Clade: Tracheophytes
- Clade: Spermatophytes
- Clade: Angiosperms
- Clade: Eudicots
- Clade: Asterids
- Order: Dipsacales
- Family: Caprifoliaceae
- Genus: Dipelta
- Species: D. yunnanensis

Binomial name
- Dipelta yunnanensis Franch. (1891)

Synonyms
- Dipelta yunnanensis var. brachycalyx Hand.-Mazz. (1924 publ. 1925); Linnaea yunnanensis (Franch.) Christenh. (2013)

= Dipelta yunnanensis =

Species of flowering plant in the honeysuckle family

Dipelta yunnanensis, synonym Linnaea yunnanensis, is a species of deciduous shrub belonging to the honeysuckle family, Caprifoliaceae. It is native to southeastern Tibet, Yunnan Province of south-central China, and northern Myanmar.
