= Xanthoparmelia teydea =

Scientific classification
- Kingdom: Fungi
- Division: Ascomycota
- Class: Lecanoromycetes
- Order: Lecanorales
- Family: Parmeliaceae
- Genus: Xanthoparmelia
- Species: X. teydea

Binomial name
- Xanthoparmelia teydea Pérez-Varg., Hern.-Padr. & Elix (2010)

Species of lichen-forming fungus

Xanthoparmelia teydea is a species of rock-dwelling foliose lichen in the family Parmeliaceae. It has an olive-brown, tightly attached thallus with narrow lobes and frequently produces fruiting bodies. The species is endemic to Tenerife (Canary Islands), where it grows on basalt in the high mountains of Teide National Park.

== Taxonomy ==
Xanthoparmelia teydea was described as a new species in 2010 by Israel Pérez-Vargas, Consuelo Hernández-Padrón and John Elix, from material collected on basalt in Teide National Park on Tenerife (Canary Islands) at about 1,975 m elevation, near the Fuente de Mesa viewpoint. The type material is preserved as TFC LICH 8653 (holotype), with isotypes in CANB and TFC LICH. The epithet teydea refers to Mount Teide, the mountain massif where the species was collected.

The authors placed the species in the Xanthoparmelia pulla group, a set of brown, rock-dwelling taxa that can be difficult to separate by appearance alone and are often distinguished by their secondary chemistry. In overall form it resembles X. pulla and other Canary Island members of the group, but it is diagnosed by its olive-brown upper surface, the absence of isidia and soredia, frequent apothecia, and a medulla dominated by gyrophoric acid (rather than the stenosporic/divaricatic acid chemistry typical of X. pulla). It can also be separated from X. pulloides (which tends to have shorter, narrower lobes and a different fatty acid chemistry, and in the Canary Islands is reported mainly from maritime sites), from X. delisei (paler, more yellow thalli with maculate lobes and different compounds), and from X. glabrans (UV+ strong blue-white due to alectoronic acid).

== Description ==
The lichen forms a foliose thallus that grows on rock (saxicolous), typically 5–15 cm across, and is tightly attached to the substrate (sometimes becoming more loosely attached in parts). The lobes are narrow and elongated, with a scalloped (crenate) outline, about 2–4 mm wide at the tips, and mostly contiguous to slightly overlapping. The upper surface is olive-brown, smooth, flat and glossy near the lobe tips, but becoming duller and more wrinkled toward the centre; it lacks soredia, isidia and pseudocyphellae. The medulla is white.

The lower surface is dark brown to black and moderately covered with rhizines; these are simple, the same colour as the lower surface, and up to about 1 mm long. Apothecia are common, usually 2–4 mm wide (occasionally up to 8 mm), often crowded toward the thallus centre; they are sessile or more often short-stalked, with a dark-brown disc that is concave when young but becomes distorted and finally convex. The asci are clavate and eight-spored. Ascospores are simple, colourless, and ellipsoid, about 7–9 × 5–6 μm. Pycnidia are fairly common and immersed in the thallus. The conidia are more or less bifusiform, about 5–6 × 1 μm.

Chemical spot tests give a blue-green reaction on the upper surface with nitric acid (HNO_{3}+). The medulla is K–, but C+ and KC+ (pink to reddish); it is PD– and UV– (or only faintly whitish). The medulla contains gyrophoric acid as the main compound, with smaller amounts of lecanoric acid, methyl divaricate, stenosporic acid, homoscrobiculin, and methyl perlatolate.

== Habitat and distribution ==
As currently documented, Xanthoparmelia teydea is known from the high mountains of Tenerife in Teide National Park, where it grows on solid basaltic rocks. It has been recorded in the "retamar" zone, a high-elevation shrub community in the Canary Islands (including Cytisus supranubius and Pterocephalus lasiospermus), in areas with Canary Island pine reafforestation.

Within the surveyed area it was reported as quite frequent and sometimes locally abundant. It is better developed on sites exposed to the north-east, where it occurs alongside other saxicolous lichens such as Glaucomaria rupicola and Lecanora muralis, and with crustose genera including Acarospora, Aspicilia, Caloplaca and Rhizocarpon.

== See also ==
- List of Xanthoparmelia species
