= Succisella andreae-molinae =

Conservation status
- Endangered (IUCN 3.1)

Scientific classification
- Kingdom: Plantae
- Clade: Embryophytes
- Clade: Tracheophytes
- Clade: Spermatophytes
- Clade: Angiosperms
- Clade: Eudicots
- Clade: Asterids
- Order: Dipsacales
- Family: Caprifoliaceae
- Genus: Succisella
- Species: S. andreae-molinae

Binomial name
- Succisella andreae-molinae Escudero & Pajarón

Species of flowering plant in the honeysuckle family

Succisella andreae-molinae is a species of plant in the family Caprifoliaceae. It is endemic to Spain. Its natural habitat is rivers. It is threatened by habitat loss.
