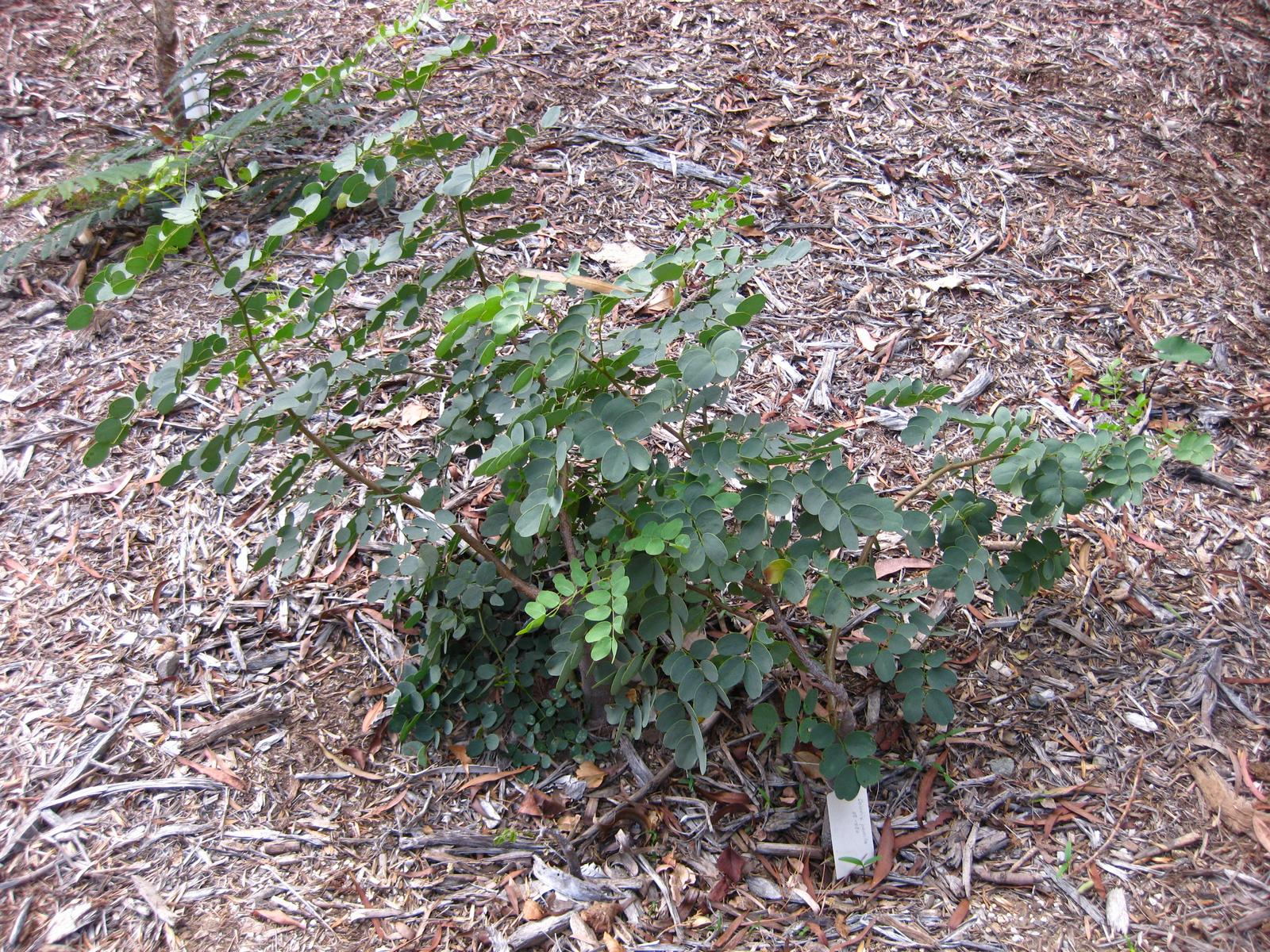
- young Delonix pumila plant at the Mildred E. Mathias Botanical Garden in Los Angeles

Conservation status
- Endangered (IUCN 3.1)

Scientific classification
- Kingdom: Plantae
- Clade: Tracheophytes
- Clade: Angiosperms
- Clade: Eudicots
- Clade: Rosids
- Order: Fabales
- Family: Fabaceae
- Subfamily: Caesalpinioideae
- Genus: Delonix
- Species: D. pumila

Binomial name
- Delonix pumila Du Puy, Phillipson & R.Rabev.

= Delonix pumila =

Species of legume

Delonix pumila is a species of flowering plant in the family Fabaceae. It is endemic to Madagascar.

== Description ==
Delonix pumila is a small, dwarfed tree growing up to 3 meters tall. It is a slow-growing plant which loses its leaves during the dry season and develops a swollen caudiciform trunk as it matures. Its flowers open at night, and have white petals, including an upper petal with a narrow tubular nectariferous claw, and long dark stamens.

== Range and habitat ==
This species is limited to a small area around Toliara in southwestern Madagascar. It has been found near 'La Table' hill approximately 25 km east of Toliara, along the escarpment edge of the adjacent Mahafaly Plateau, and in an area south of Onilahy River. Its estimated extent of occurrence (EOO) is 311 km^{2} and the area of occupancy (AOO) is 93 km^{2}.

It inhabits spiny thicket and coastal bushland with succulent species of Euphorbia on limestone rock, from sea level up to 160 meters elevation.

== Ecology ==
Its night-opening flowers are thought to be pollinated by moths.

== Conservation and threats ==
The spiny thicket plant communities of southern Madagascar are threatened by human activity. The climate is arid, and mature thicket grows and regenerates slowly. It is being degraded by livestock grazing, firewood collecting, charcoal production, selective logging, and agricultural expansion. The species' main population is close to Toliara, a large and expanding town, which increases human impact on the landscape, including roadbuilding and widening. Collection of mature specimens from the wild for sale internationally as ornamental plants is also a threat.

== Uses ==
It is cultivated as an ornamental plant.
