= Delonix boiviniana =

Conservation status
- Least Concern (IUCN 3.1)

Scientific classification
- Kingdom: Plantae
- Clade: Tracheophytes
- Clade: Angiosperms
- Clade: Eudicots
- Clade: Rosids
- Order: Fabales
- Family: Fabaceae
- Subfamily: Caesalpinioideae
- Genus: Delonix
- Species: D. boiviniana

Binomial name
- Delonix boiviniana (Baill.) Capuron

Species of legume

Delonix boiviniana is a species of plant in the family Fabaceae. It is found only in Madagascar.
