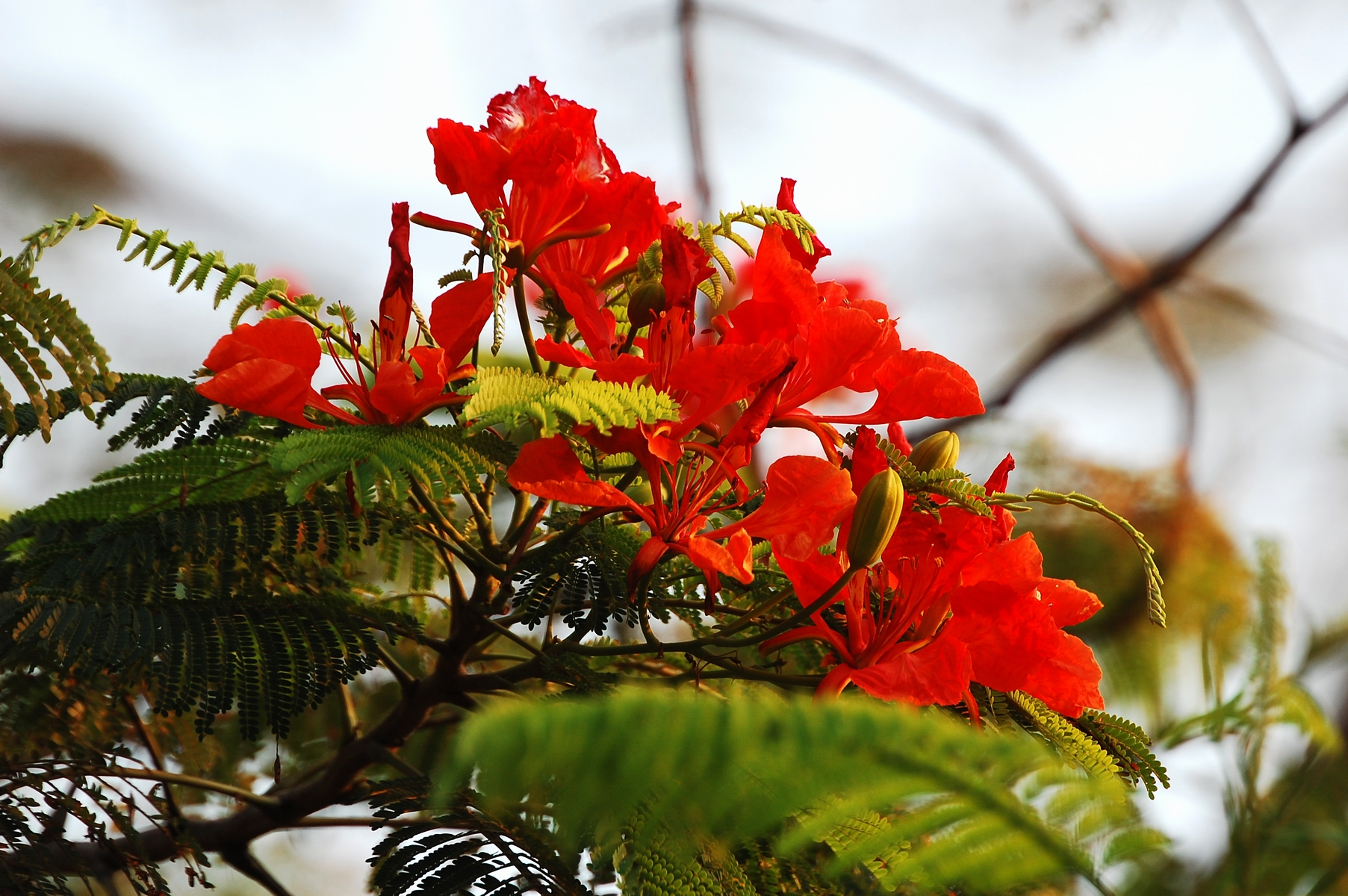
- Royal poinciana (Delonix regia)

Scientific classification
- Kingdom: Plantae
- Clade: Embryophytes
- Clade: Tracheophytes
- Clade: Angiosperms
- Clade: Eudicots
- Clade: Rosids
- Order: Fabales
- Family: Fabaceae
- Subfamily: Caesalpinioideae
- Genus: Delonix; Raf. (1837)

Type species
- Delonix regia (Bojer ex Hook.) Raf.

Species
- See text

Synonyms
- Aprevalia Baill. (1884); Lemuropisum H.Perrier (1938 publ. 1939)

= Delonix =

Genus of flowering plants in the bean family

Delonix is a genus of flowering plants in the family Fabaceae, subfamily Caesalpinioideae. It contains trees that are native to Madagascar and East Africa. By far the best known species is the Royal Poinciana (D. regia).

The name of the genus is derived from the Greek words δηλος (delos), meaning "evident," and ονυξ (onyx), meaning "claw," referring to the petals. The common name, poinciana, comes from a former genus of the same name in which the members of the current genus Delonix were classified along with plants now placed in the genus Caesalpinia.

== Species ==
12 species are accepted:

Image	Scientific name	Distribution
	Delonix baccal (Chiov.) Baker f.	Ethiopia, Kenya, Somalia
	Delonix boiviniana (Baill.) Capuron	Madagascar
	Delonix brachycarpa (R.Vig.) Capuron	Madagascar
	Delonix decaryi (R.Vig.) Capuron	Madagascar
	Delonix edulis (H.Perrier) Babineau & Bruneau	Madagascar
	Delonix elata (L.) Gamble	East Africa, southern Arabia east to western India
	Delonix floribunda (Baill.) Capuron	Madagascar
	Delonix leucantha (R.Vig.) Du Puy, Phillipson & R.Rabev.	Madagascar
	Delonix pumila Du Puy, Phillipson & R.Rabev.	Madagascar
	Delonix regia (Bojer ex Hook.) Raf.	Madagascar
	Delonix tomentosa (R.Vig.) Capuron	Madagascar
	Delonix velutina (R.Vig.) Capuron	Madagascar

== Use ==
These plants (collectively known as fengoky or fengoka) release brown resin lumps that can be dissolved to make glue, or sucked as edible sweets among the Malagasy. Their seeds too are roasted and eaten as a snack in the south.
