= Pterocephalidium =

Scientific classification
- Kingdom: Plantae
- Clade: Tracheophytes
- Clade: Angiosperms
- Clade: Eudicots
- Clade: Asterids
- Order: Dipsacales
- Family: Caprifoliaceae
- Genus: Pterocephalidium; G.López
- Species: P. diandrum

Binomial name
- Pterocephalidium diandrum (Lag.) G.López

Genus of plants

Pterocephalidium is a monotypic genus of flowering plants belonging to the family Caprifoliaceae. The only species is Pterocephalidium diandrum.

The species is found in the Iberian Peninsula.
