= Delonix baccal =

Conservation status
- Near Threatened (IUCN 3.1)

Scientific classification
- Kingdom: Plantae
- Clade: Tracheophytes
- Clade: Angiosperms
- Clade: Eudicots
- Clade: Rosids
- Order: Fabales
- Family: Fabaceae
- Subfamily: Caesalpinioideae
- Genus: Delonix
- Species: D. baccal

Binomial name
- Delonix baccal (Chiov.) Baker f.

Species of legume

Delonix baccal is a species of leguminous tree in the family Fabaceae. It is found in Ethiopia, Kenya, and Somalia.
