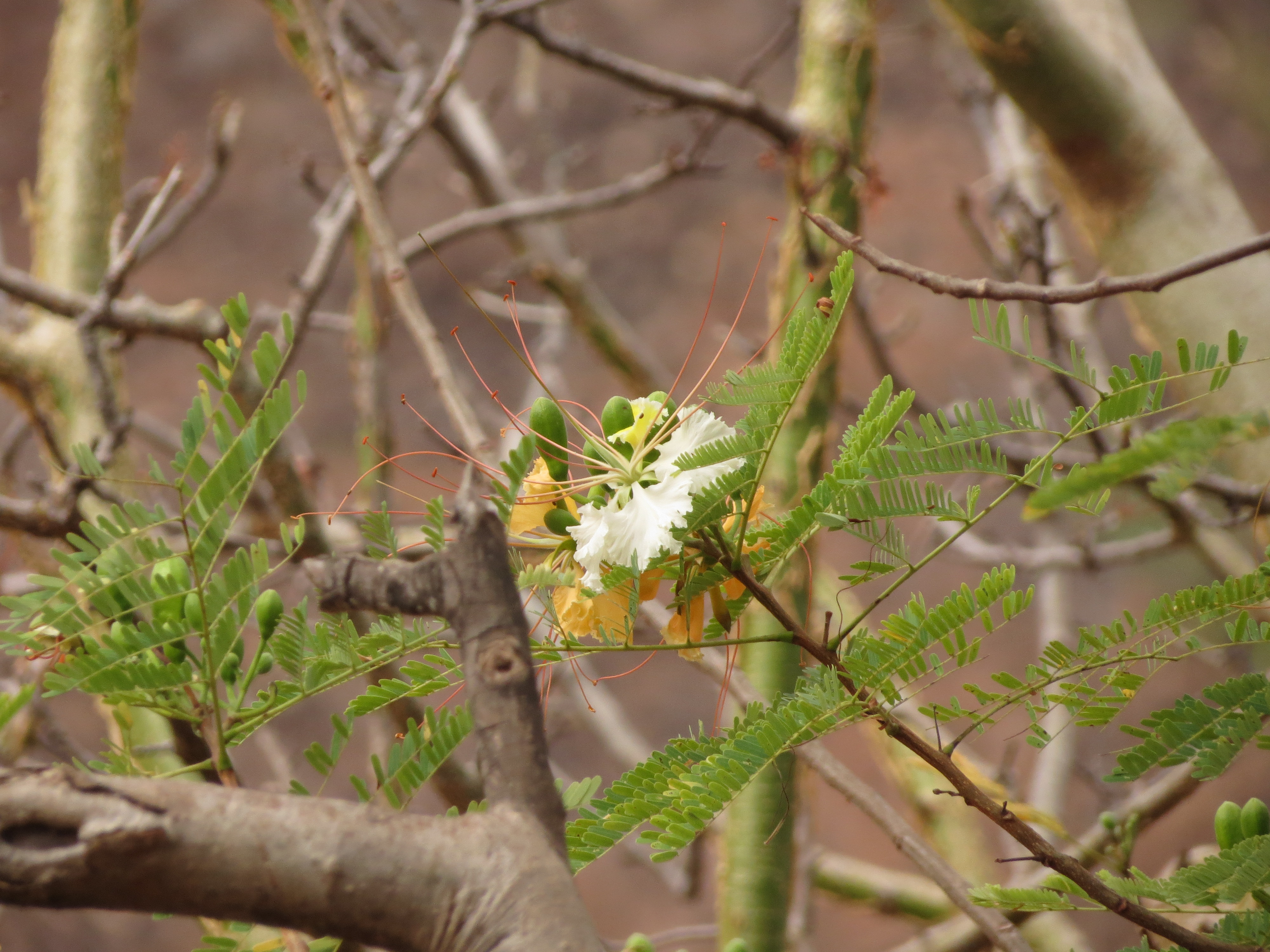

Conservation status
- Least Concern (IUCN 3.1)

Scientific classification
- Kingdom: Plantae
- Clade: Embryophytes
- Clade: Tracheophytes
- Clade: Angiosperms
- Clade: Eudicots
- Clade: Rosids
- Order: Fabales
- Family: Fabaceae
- Subfamily: Caesalpinioideae
- Genus: Delonix
- Species: D. elata

Binomial name
- Delonix elata (L) Gamble

Synonyms
- Caesalpinia elata (L.) Sw.; Poinciana elata L.; Poinciana playfairii T.Anderson

= Delonix elata =

Species of legume

Delonix elata is a species of flowering plant in the family Fabaceae. Common names in English include white gul mohur, creamy peacock flower and yellow gul mohur.

== Taxonomy ==
The species was described by Carl Linnaeus in 1756, and placed in the genus Poinciana.

== Distribution ==
The species is native to the deserts and dry shrublands of Africa (from Sudan to Tanzania) and the Arabian Peninsula. It has been introduced to Asia.
