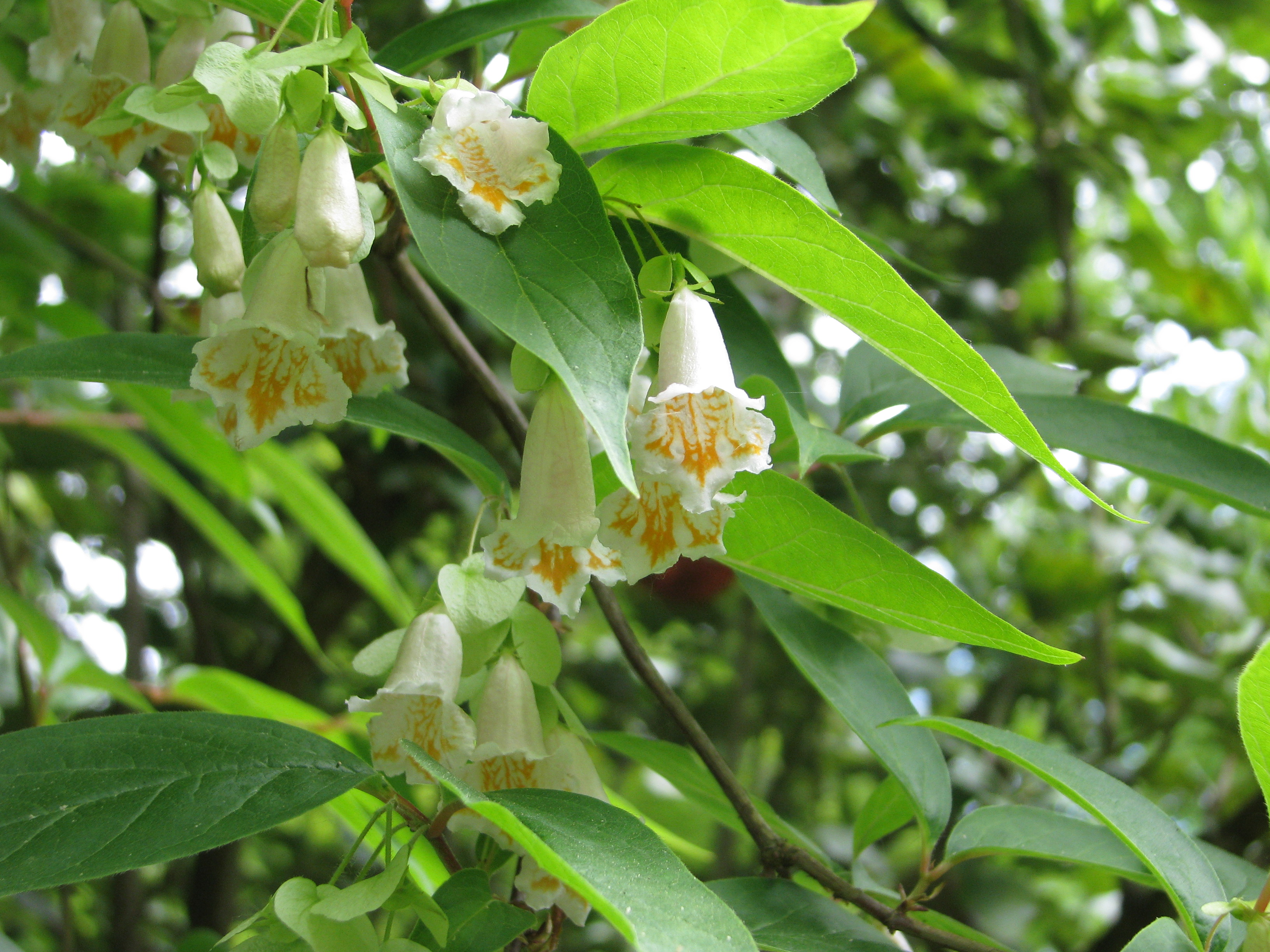
- Dipelta floribunda

Scientific classification
- Kingdom: Plantae
- Clade: Tracheophytes
- Clade: Angiosperms
- Clade: Eudicots
- Clade: Asterids
- Order: Dipsacales
- Family: Caprifoliaceae
- Subfamily: Linnaeoideae
- Genus: Dipelta; Maxim. (1877)

Species
- Dipelta elegans Batalin; Dipelta floribunda Maxim.; Dipelta yunnanensis Franch.

Synonyms
- Cavaleriella H.Lév. (1914)

= Dipelta =

Genus of flowering plants

Dipelta is a genus of three large, deciduous shrubs that are members of the family Caprifoliaceae. They are native to north-central and southern China, southeastern Tibet, and northern Myanmar, but have been cultivated widely as decorative garden plants. They have attractive peeling bark, bell-shaped flowers carried singly or in corymbs and fruit with papery bracts. They develop in a rounded shape and attain a height of about 3–4 metres (10–13 ft). The leaves are simple, oval to lance shaped and borne in opposite pairs.

Dipelta floribunda has gained the Royal Horticultural Society's Award of Garden Merit.

== Species ==
Three species are accepted.

- Dipelta elegans Batalin – Gansu and northern Sichuan in west-central China
- Dipelta floribunda Maxim. – central and east-central China
- Dipelta yunnanensis Franch. – south-central China, southeastern Tibet, and northern Myanmar
