= Delonix tomentosa =

Conservation status
- Critically endangered, possibly extinct (IUCN 3.1)

Scientific classification
- Kingdom: Plantae
- Clade: Tracheophytes
- Clade: Angiosperms
- Clade: Eudicots
- Clade: Rosids
- Order: Fabales
- Family: Fabaceae
- Subfamily: Caesalpinioideae
- Genus: Delonix
- Species: D. tomentosa

Binomial name
- Delonix tomentosa (R. Vig.) Capuron

Species of legume

Delonix tomentosa is a species of flowering plant in the family Fabaceae. It is endemic to Madagascar, where it is known only from the type specimen collected over 100 years ago. It has not been seen since and may be extinct.
