= Pseudoscabiosa =

Scientific classification
- Kingdom: Plantae
- Clade: Tracheophytes
- Clade: Angiosperms
- Clade: Eudicots
- Clade: Asterids
- Order: Dipsacales
- Family: Caprifoliaceae
- Genus: Pseudoscabiosa; Devesa

Genus of plants

Pseudoscabiosa is a genus of flowering plants belonging to the family Caprifoliaceae.

Its native range is Western Mediterranean.

Species:

- Pseudoscabiosa grosii (Font Quer) Devesa
- Pseudoscabiosa limonifolia (Vahl) Devesa
- Pseudoscabiosa saxatilis (Cav.) Devesa
