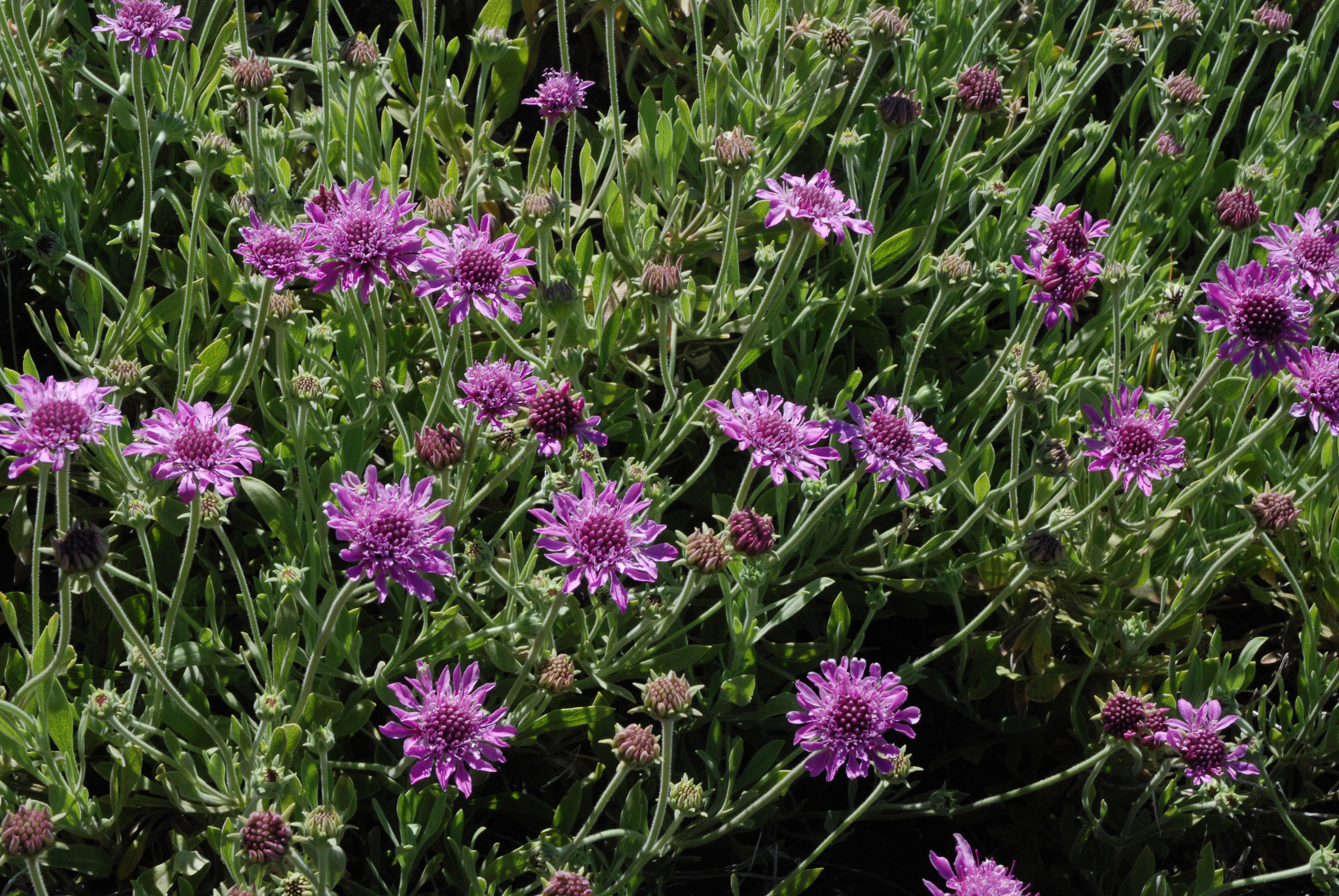
- Pterocephalus porphyranthus

Scientific classification
- Kingdom: Plantae
- Clade: Embryophytes
- Clade: Tracheophytes
- Clade: Spermatophytes
- Clade: Angiosperms
- Clade: Eudicots
- Clade: Asterids
- Order: Dipsacales
- Family: Caprifoliaceae
- Subfamily: Dipsacoideae
- Genus: Pterocephalus; Vaill. ex Adans. (1763)

Species
- 34; see text

Synonyms
- Coulterella Tiegh. (1909), nom. illeg.

= Pterocephalus =

Genus of flowering plants in the honeysuckle family

Pterocephalus is a genus of flowering plants in the family Caprifoliaceae. It comprises 34 species of herbs and shrubs ranging from the Mediterranean to central Asia, the Himalayas, and tropical Africa.

From Greek πτερον, pteron, a wing, and κεφαλη, kephale, a head, in reference to the receptacle of the flowers being villous or chaffy.

== Species ==
34 species are accepted.

- Pterocephalus afghanicus (Aitch. & Hemsl.) Boiss.
- Pterocephalus arabicus Boiss.
- Pterocephalus bellidifolius Boiss.
- Pterocephalus brevis Coult.
- Pterocephalus canus Coult. ex DC.
- Pterocephalus depressus Coss. & Balansa
- Pterocephalus dumetorum (Brouss. ex Willd.) Coult. - Mountain scabious
- Pterocephalus frutescens Hochst. ex A.Rich.
- Pterocephalus fruticulosus Korovin
- Pterocephalus gedrosiacus Rech.f., Aellen & Esfand.
- Pterocephalus ghahremanii Jamzad
- Pterocephalus glandulosissimus Ponert
- Pterocephalus khorassanicus Czerniak.
- Pterocephalus kurdicus Vatke
- Pterocephalus lasiospermus Link
- Pterocephalus laxus I.K.Ferguson
- Pterocephalus lignosus Freyn & Bornm.
- Pterocephalus multiflorus Poech
- Pterocephalus nestorianus Nábělek
- Pterocephalus persicus Boiss.
- Pterocephalus pinardii Boiss.
- Pterocephalus plumosus (L.) F.Dietr.
- Pterocephalus porphyranthus Svent.
- Pterocephalus pterocephala (L.) Dörfl.
- Pterocephalus pulverulentus Boiss. & Balansa
- Pterocephalus pyrethrifolius Boiss. & Hohen.
- Pterocephalus ramianensis Ranjbar & Z.Ranjbar
- Pterocephalus sanctus Decne.
- Pterocephalus shepardii Post & Beauverd
- Pterocephalus spathulatus (Lag.) Coult.
- Pterocephalus strictus Boiss. & Hohen.
- Pterocephalus szovitsii Boiss.
- Pterocephalus virens Webb & Berthel.
- Pterocephalus wendelboi Rech.f.

=== Formerly placed here ===
Pterothamnus centennii (M.J.Cannon) V.Mayer & Ehrend. (as Pterocephalus centennii M.J.Cannon)
