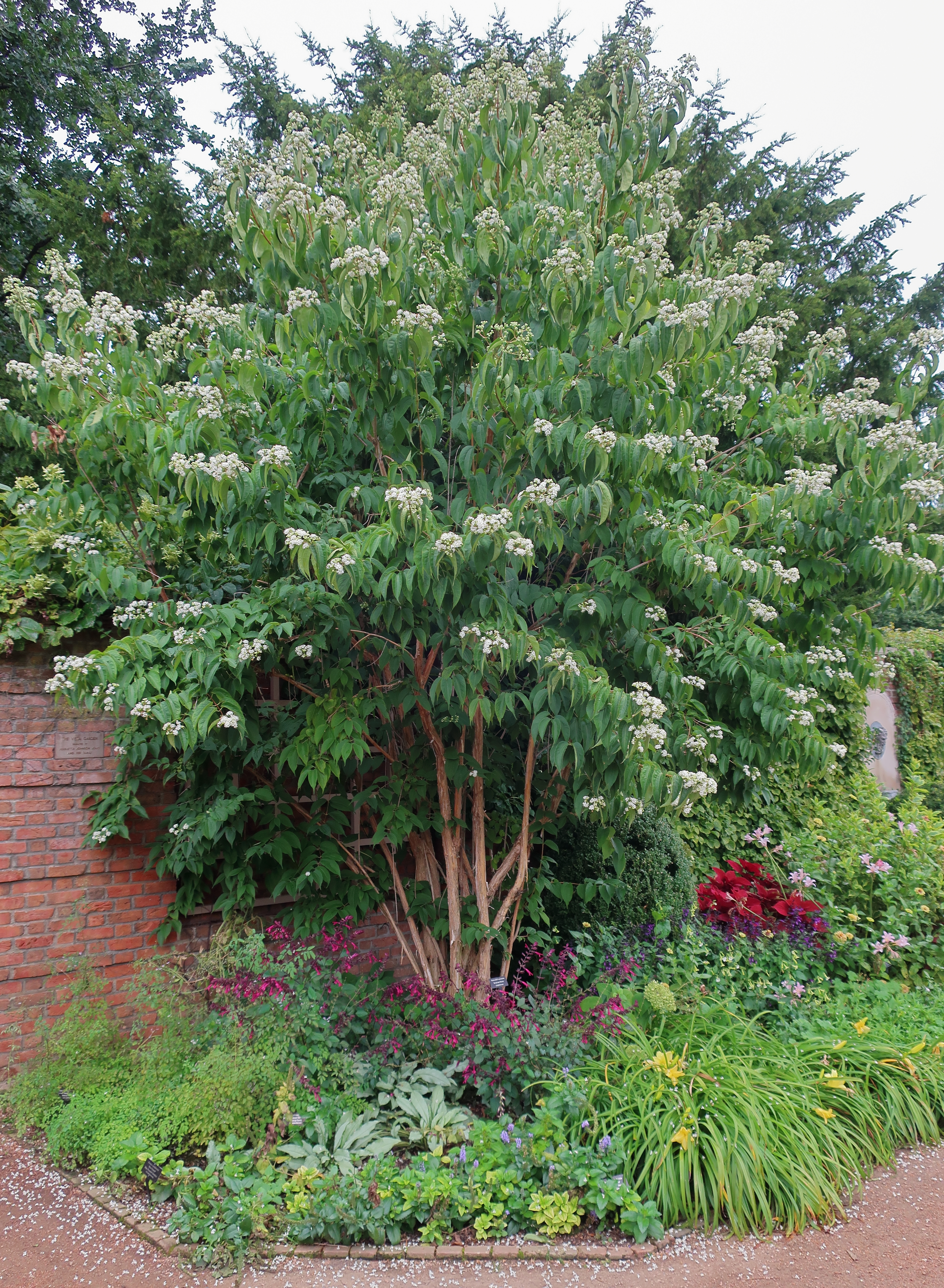
- Heptacodium miconioides in Chicago Botanic Garden (Illinois, USA)

Conservation status
- Vulnerable (IUCN 2.3)

Scientific classification
- Kingdom: Plantae
- Clade: Tracheophytes
- Clade: Angiosperms
- Clade: Eudicots
- Clade: Asterids
- Order: Dipsacales
- Family: Caprifoliaceae
- Subfamily: Caprifolioideae
- Genus: Heptacodium; Rehder
- Species: H. miconioides

Binomial name
- Heptacodium miconioides Rehder

Synonyms
- Heptacodium jasminoides Airy Shaw

= Heptacodium =

Tree endemic to China (seven-son tree)

Heptacodium miconioides, the seven-son flower, is a species of flowering plant. It is the sole species in the monotypic genus Heptacodium, of the honeysuckle family Caprifoliaceae. The common name "seven-son flower" is a direct translation of the Standard Chinese name 七子花 qī zi huā.

Endemic to China, this species was discovered for Western horticulture in 1907 by the British plant hunter Ernest Wilson on behalf of the Arnold Arboretum. It was growing on mountain cliffs at 'Hsing-Shan Hsien' in present-day Xingshan County in the west of Hubei Province in central China. Considered rare even at that time, only nine populations are known to remain in the wild (e.g. one on Tiantai Mountain), all of them in Anhui and Zhejiang provinces and threatened by habitat loss. The species is now under second-class national protection in China. The Sino-American Botanical Expedition of 1980 collected viable seeds and sent them to the Arnold Arboretum where it was found to be readily cultivated. The plant is now grown as an ornamental around the world and is considered an important source of food for insects due to its late flowering period.

== Description ==
Heptacodium miconioides is a deciduous large shrub or small tree, typically growing to a height of 4–9 m (13–30 ft). The bark of the trunk is papery and thin, light tan in colour, and exfoliates in strips or sheets. The upright, spreading, quadrangular branches give the plant a rounded, often irregular shape. The dark-green cordate leaves are opposite, 8–10 cm long by 5–6 cm wide, with entire margins and deeply impressed venation running parallel to the margin. In September, H. miconioides produces large shows of small fragrant white blooms attractive to honey bees, solitary bees, bumblebees, butterflies and (in North America) hummingbirds, the flowers five-petalled, < 13 mm across. When the white corollas have fallen, the calyces develop into deep red expanded lobes which persist into November. The plant may be found in scrub, woodlands, and on the margins of broadleaved evergreen forests, often on cliffs, at altitudes of 600–1000 metres.

=== Six flowers, not seven ===
Noted plantsman John Grimshaw, Editor-in Chief of Curtis’s Botanical Magazine and former Director of the Yorkshire Arboretum, relayed the following observation of H. miconioides from distinguished botanist Allen J. Coombes, (formerly of the Hillier Gardens and currently coordinator of scientific collections at the University Botanic Garden Puebla, Mexico):

'Seven' is actually misleading, for the flowers in each capitulum are held in two rows of three clustered around a central bud, which is not a flower bud but in fact a continuation of the inflorescence axis, which will push up as the flowers fade and develop a new ring of six flowers, again around a central bud. Three such iterations have been observed.

== Cultivation ==
Readily propagated from either seed or by softwood cuttings, the species has since become widely available in North America and Europe, and was stocked by 26 nurseries in the UK alone in 2011. H. miconioides is extremely hardy, and tolerant of temperatures as low as −35 °C (−31 °F). It is also fast-growing, and can reach a height of 3 m (9.8 ft) in just five years; it is also very shade tolerant. All six of the first H. miconioides planted in the United States in 1980 at the Arnold Arboretum are still alive, indicating an expected lifespan greater than 40 years. This plant has gained the Royal Horticultural Society's Award of Garden Merit.

=== Varieties ===
After the seven-son flower was introduced to the market in North America and Europe in the late 1980s, only the wild form was available for many years, as the selection and breeding of woody plant varieties takes a long time. Now, the first cultivated varieties are slowly coming onto the market:

- ‘Temple of Bloom’: This variety was developed in the United States as part of a planned mutation breeding program using X-ray irradiation of plant material. It was selected in 2008 in a commercial nursery in Michigan and, after further testing, a patent application was filed in 2017. It differs from the wild form in that it has a lower and more compact growth habit, more abundant inflorescences, and a bright red coloration of the calyxes after the corollas have fallen off.
- ‘Tianshan’: Launched in 2014, this French selection has a lower and more compact growth habit than the wild form, flowers more profusely, and also flowers when younger.
- ‘Stars & Sparks’: This variety was selected in Oregon/USA with the aim of finding a vegetatively propagable variety with a single-stemmed, slender growth habit, particularly for planting along urban streets and for landscaping. The mother plant of this variety was selected in 2017 and a patent was filed for it in 2024.

== Notable trees ==
In the UK, a specimen 8 m high (2012) planted in 1981 formerly grew in the Flagpole Bed alongside Jermyn House at the Sir Harold Hillier Gardens, Ampfield, near Romsey.

== Etymology ==
The generic name of Heptacodium has sometimes erroneously been said to mean 'seven bells' with a second element derived from Greek κώδων (codon) - 'bell', but was in fact coined by Arnold Arboretum taxonomist Alfred Rehder from the Greek κώδειά (codeia) - 'poppy head' with the prefix έπτά (hepta-) 'seven', giving the meaning 'having seven structures resembling poppy heads'. The specific epithet miconioides alludes to the similarities in the plant, particularly its boldly-veined leaves, to certain species belonging to the unrelated genus Miconia (family Melastomataceae).

The common name in Standard Chinese 七子花 (qī zi huā) is composed of the characters 七 (qī) 'seven', 子 (zi) 'son' / 'child' and 花 (huā) 'flower' - whence 'Seven Son(s) Flower' ('Flower with seven children'). Approximate pronunciation (not allowing for tonality of Chinese language) 'Chee-dzu-hwaa'.

== Medicinal potential ==
Recent tests have demonstrated that extracts from the plant possess antibacterial activity. The leaf blades of Heptacodium have been found to contain flavonoids, tannins, alkaloids, saponins, lignin and chlorogenic acid.

== Gallery ==
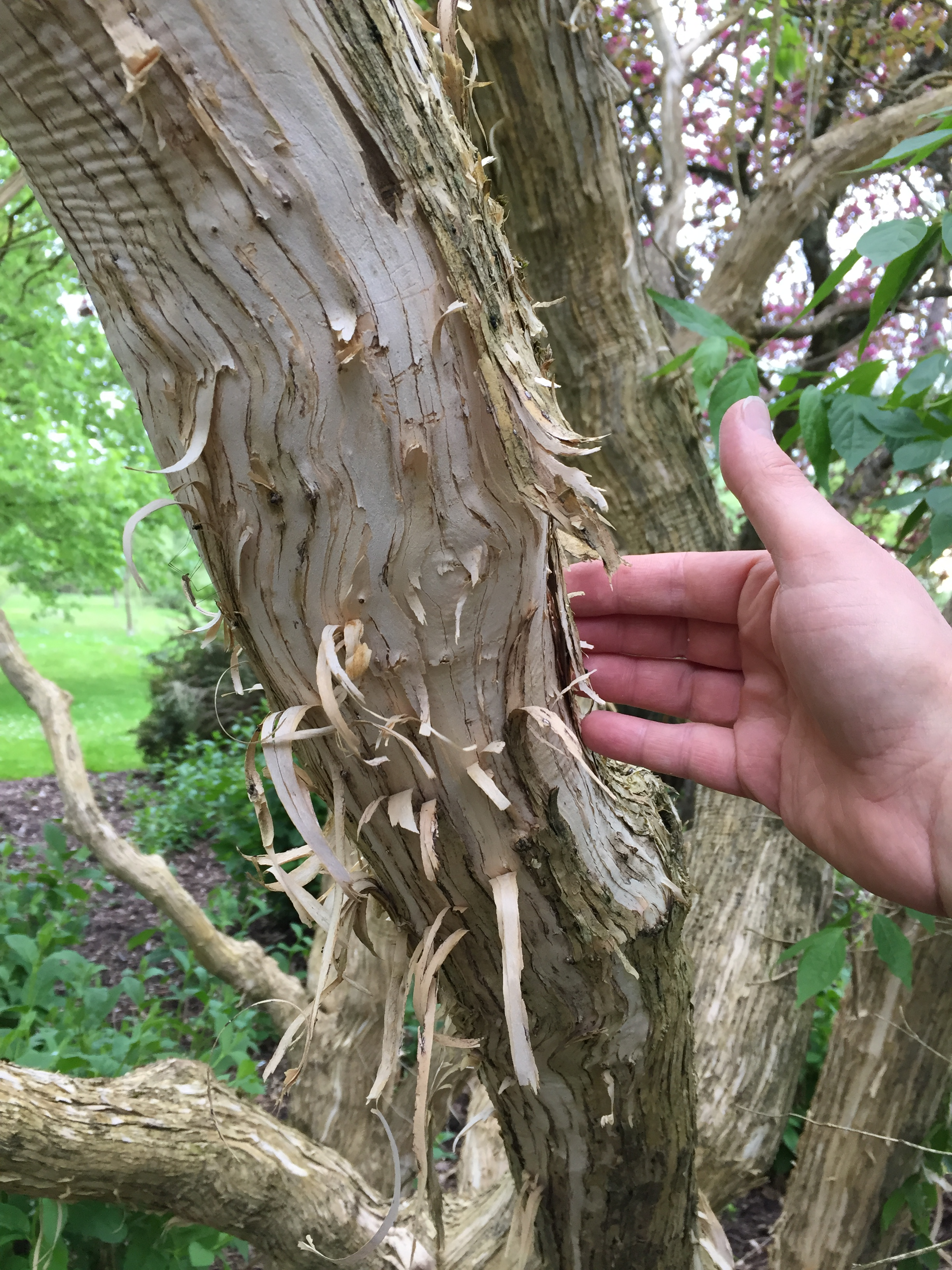
Characteristic peeling bark of mature specimen.

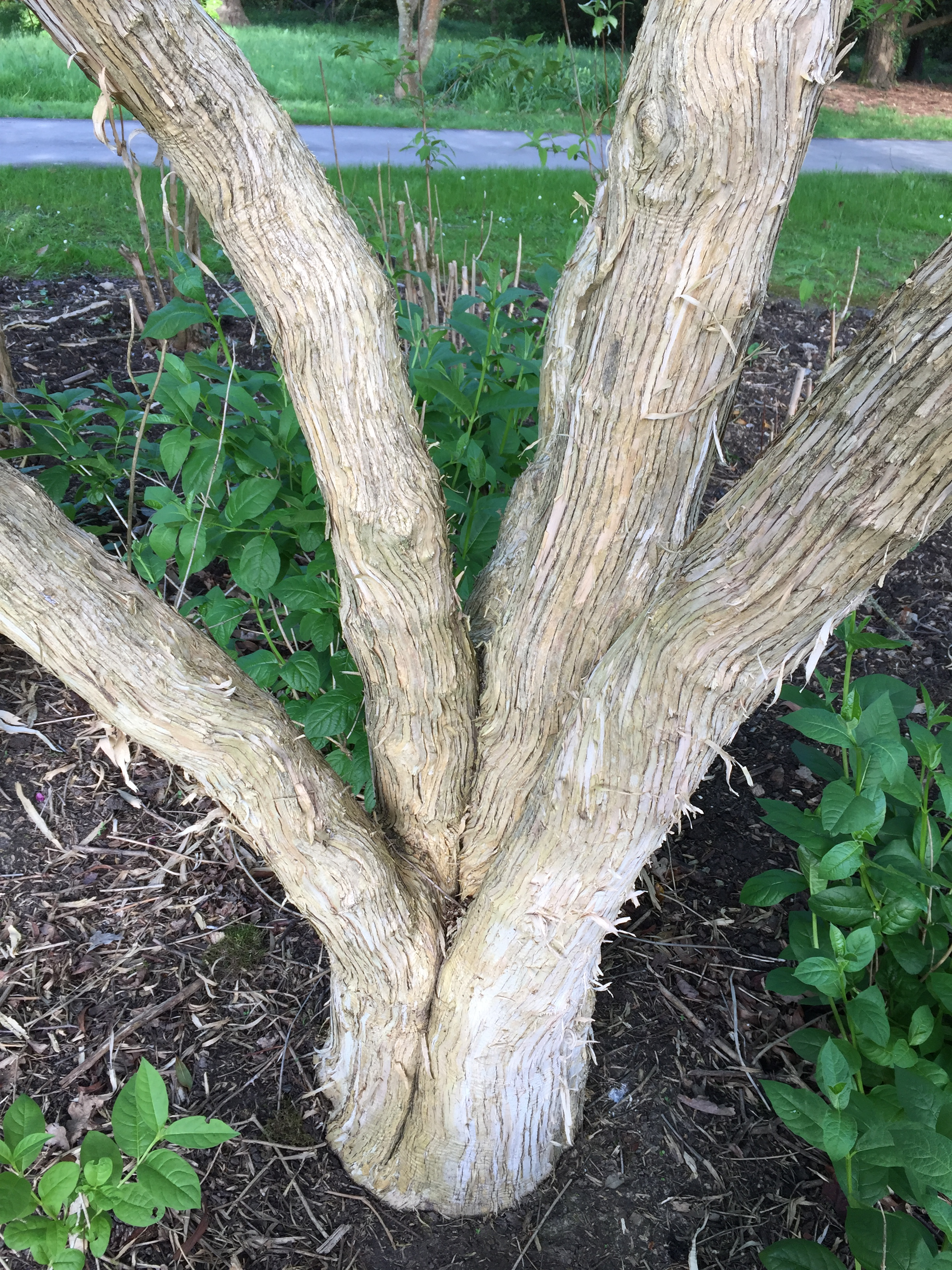
Four trunks of mature specimen, side view.

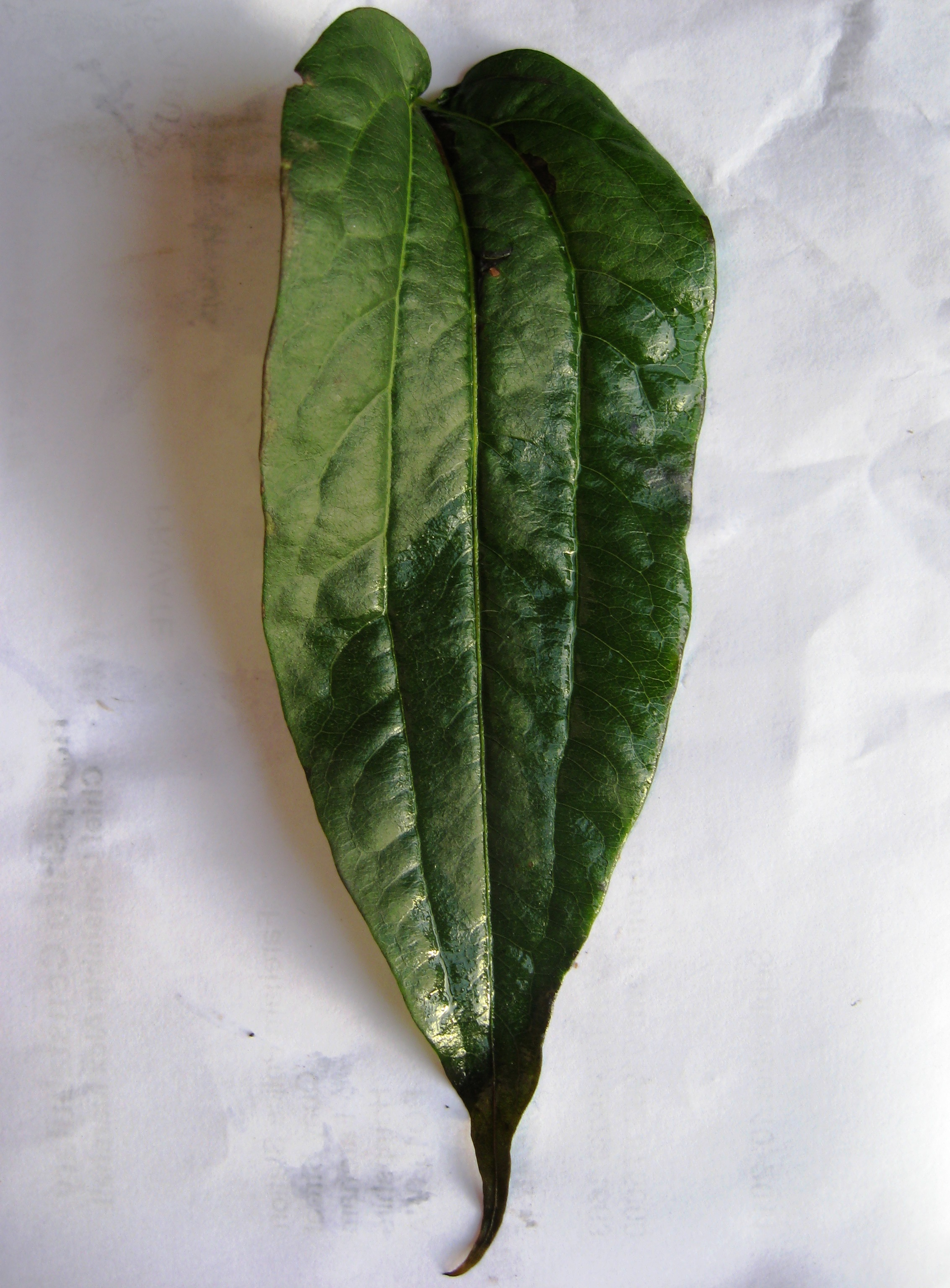
Single leaf, showing characteristic, three, parallel, longitudinal veins.

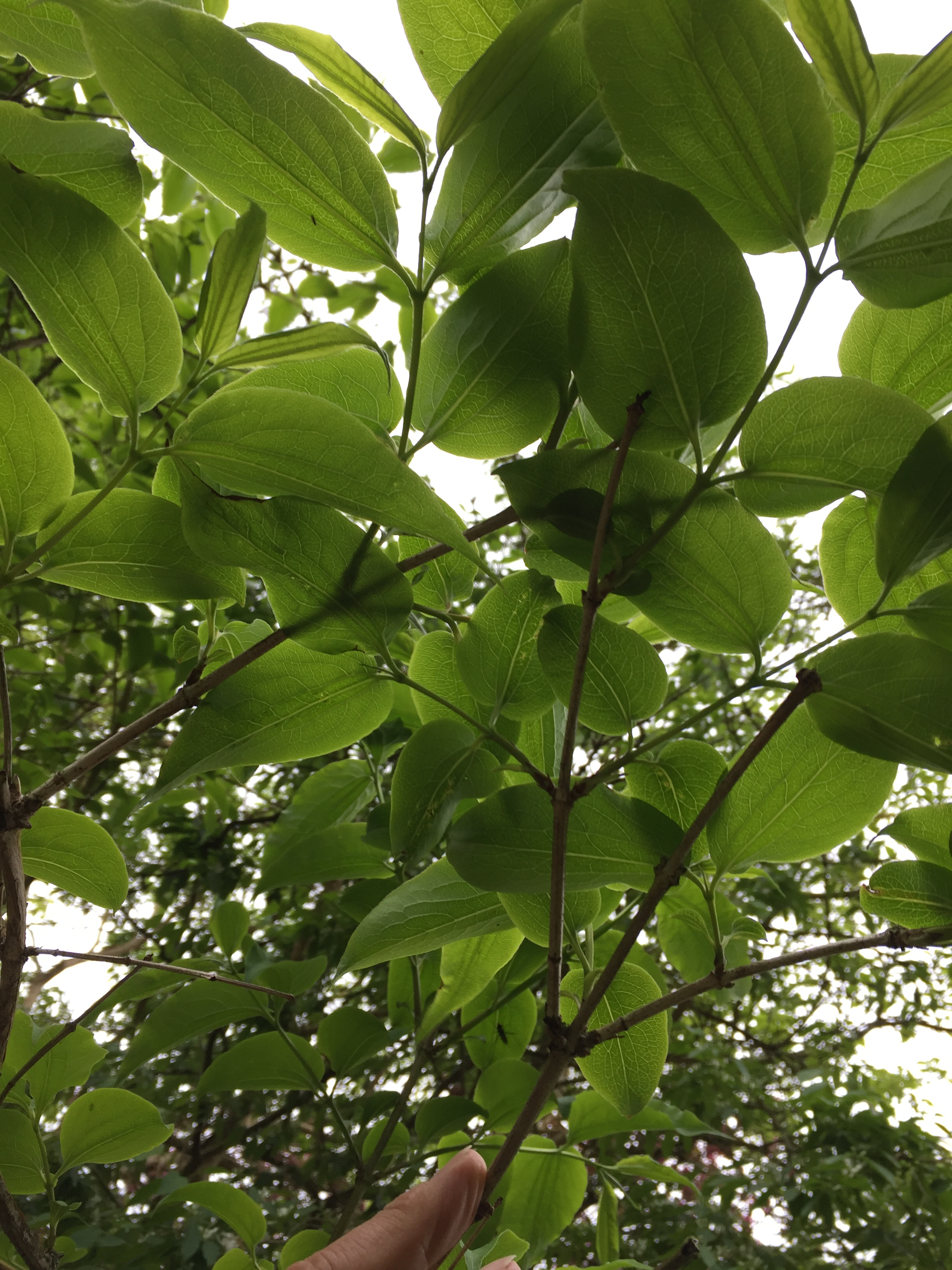
Spring foliage in canopy of mature specimen, viewed from beneath.

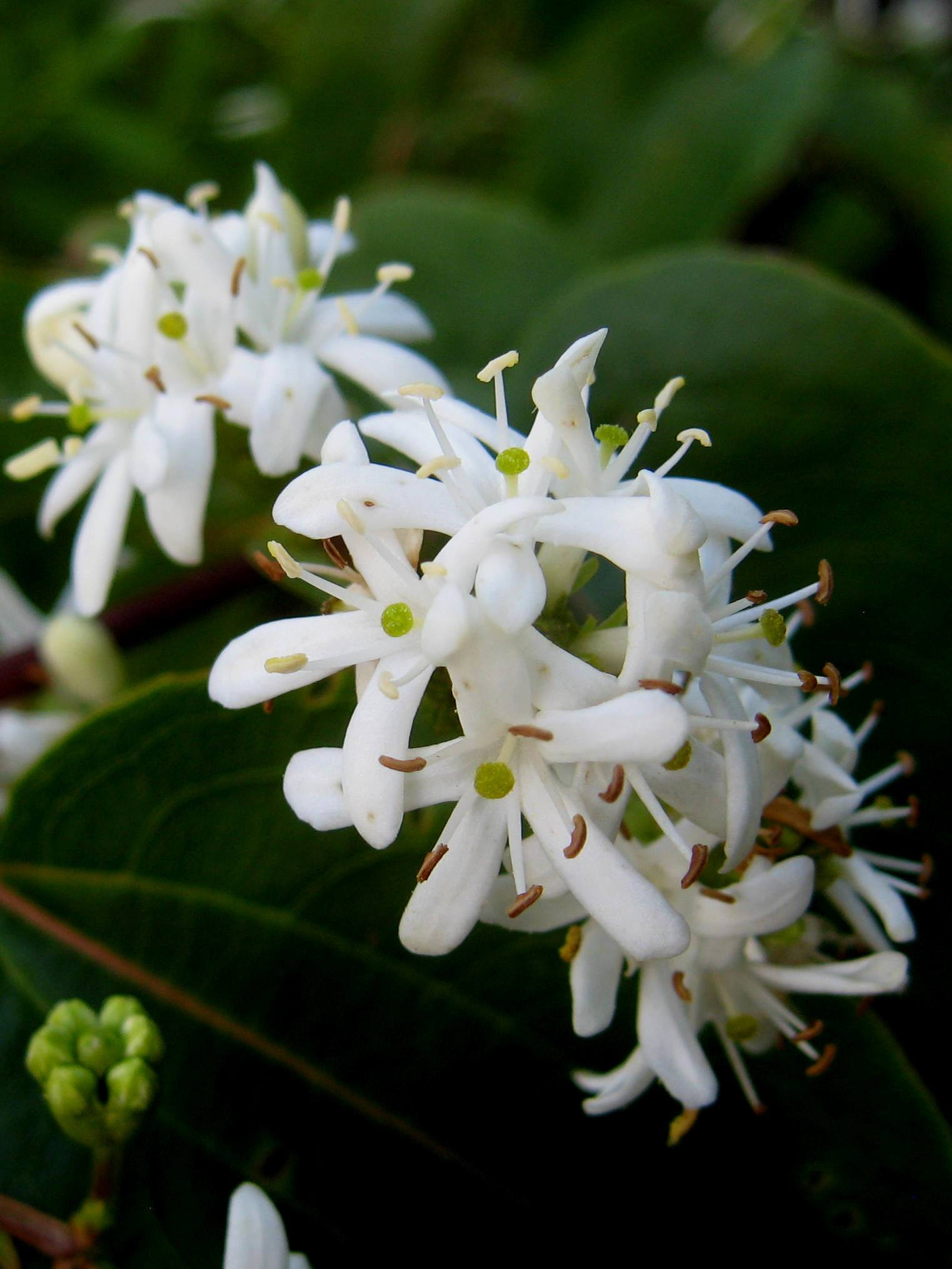
Close-up of small, scented, white flowers in late Summer / Early Autumn.

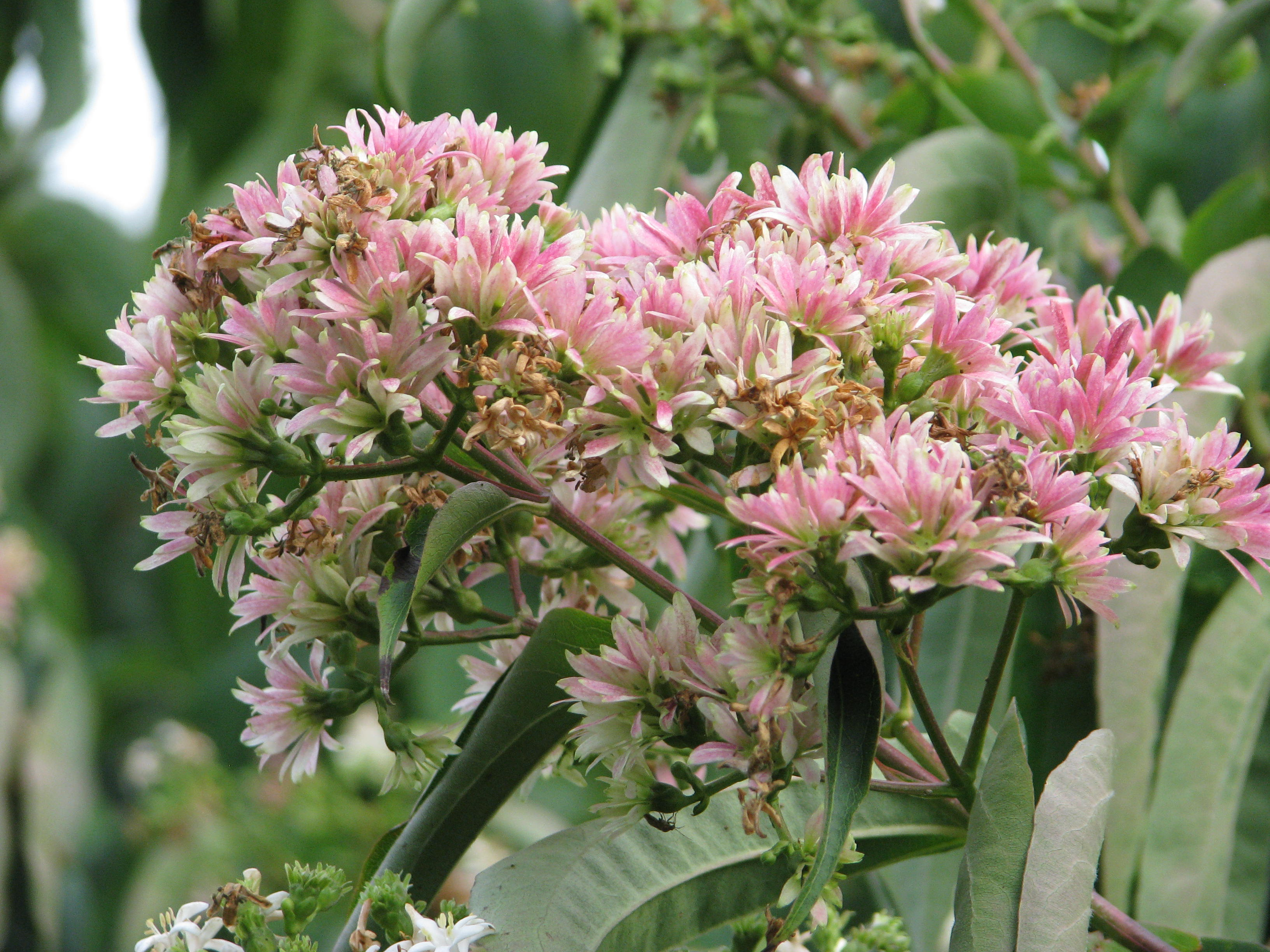
Pink colouration of fruiting calyces.

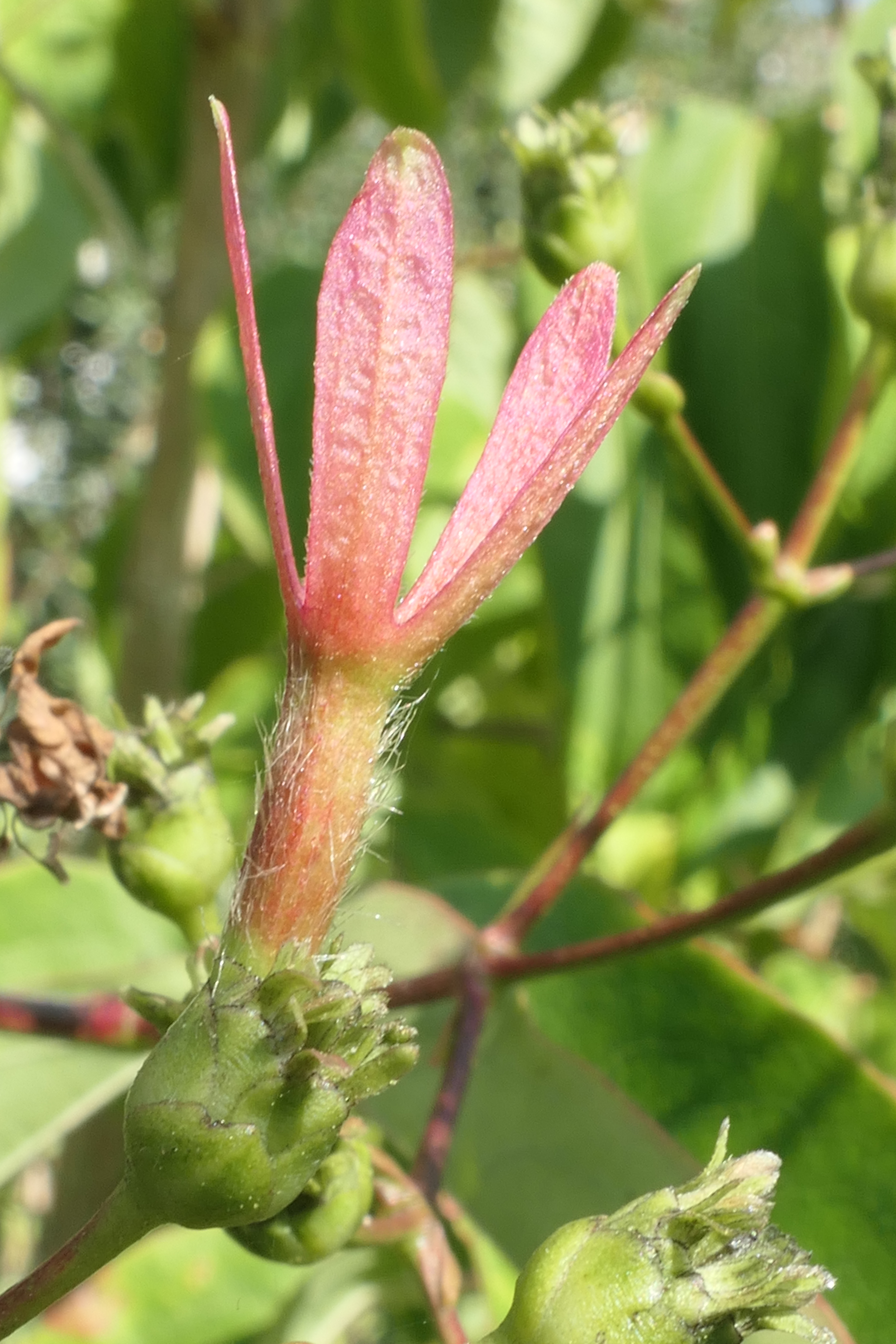
Close-up of a single achene fruit

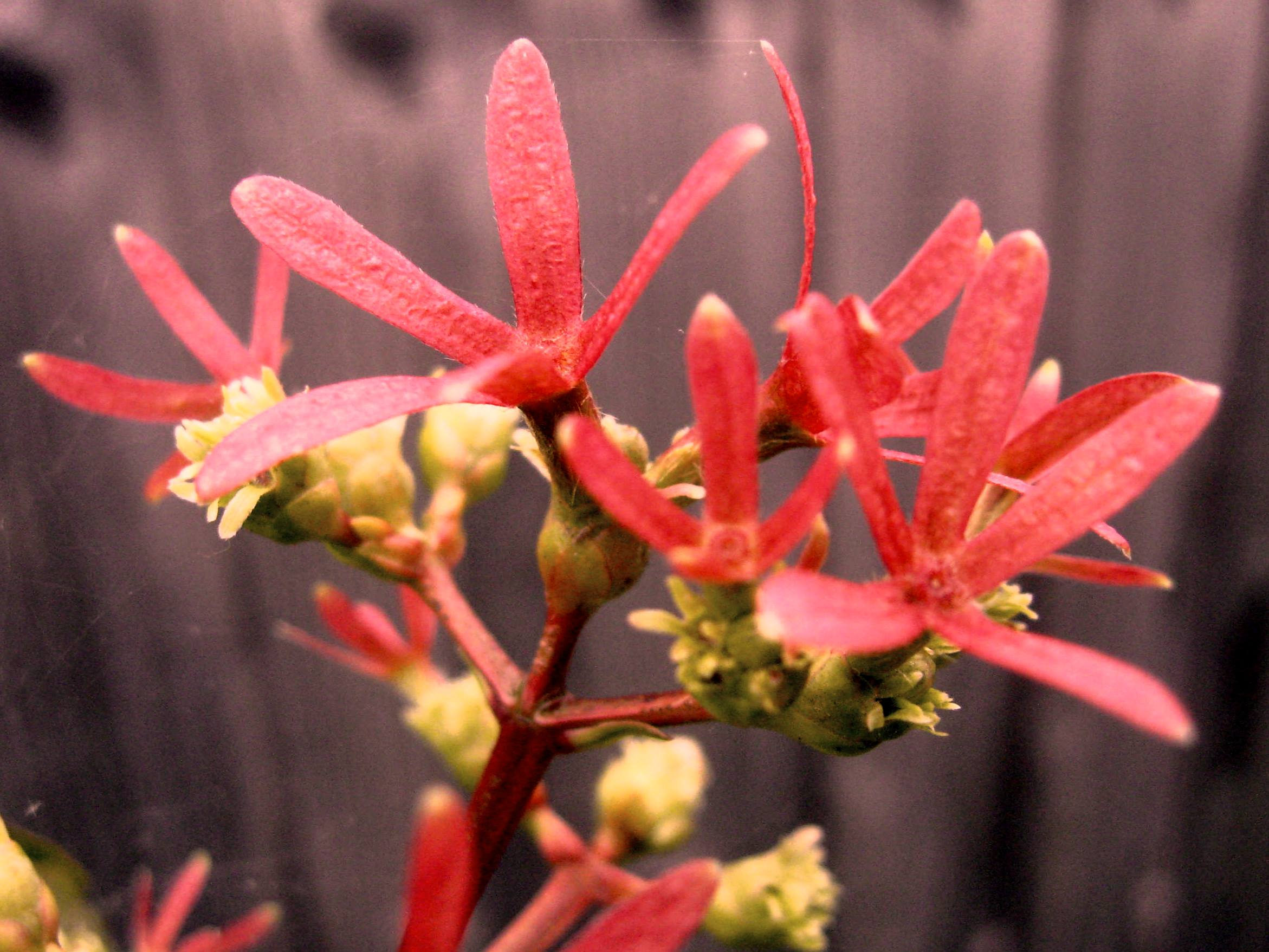
Close-up of fruiting Calyces in late October.

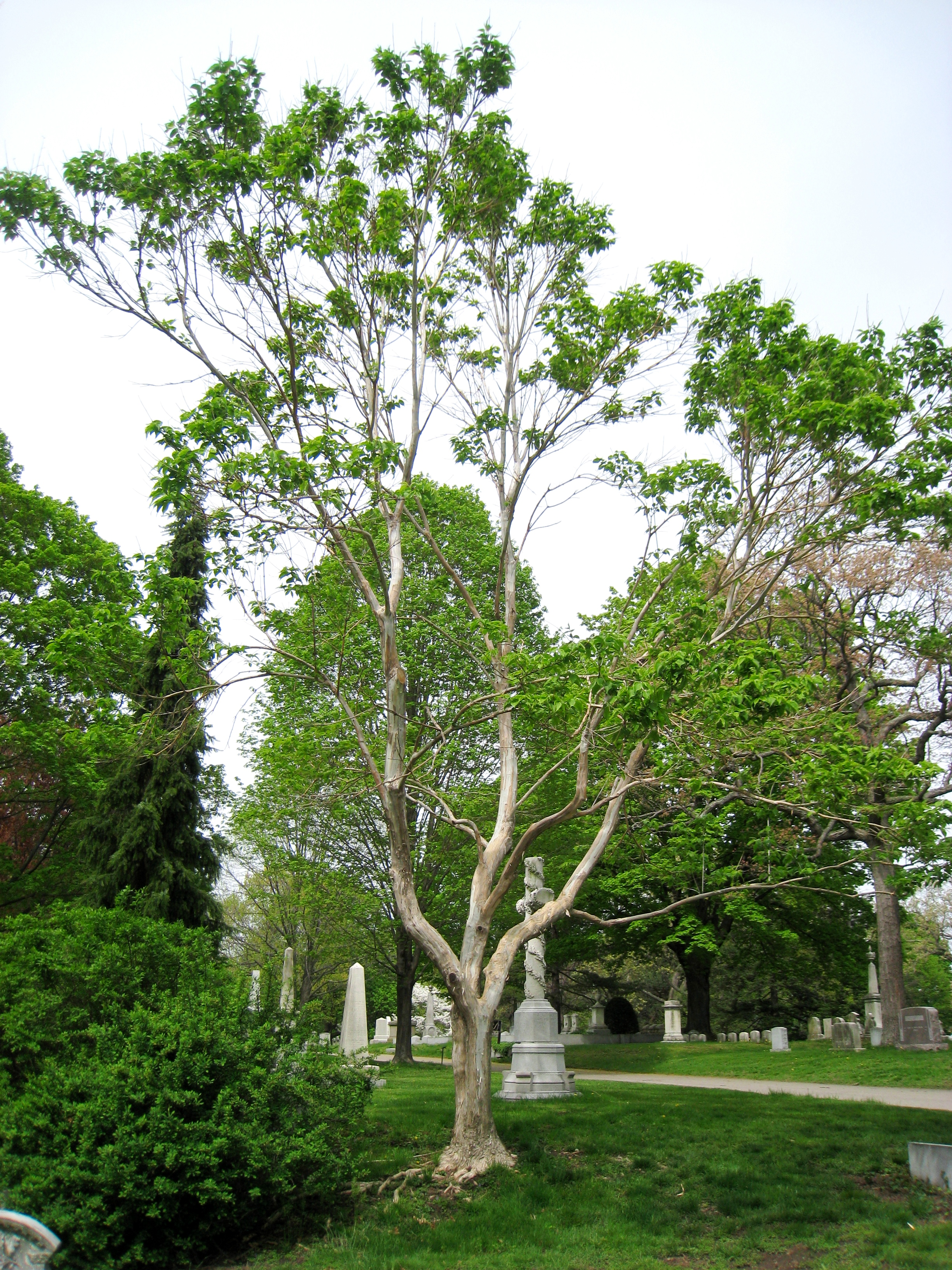
Notable tree in Mount Auburn Cemetery
