= Bassecoia =

Scientific classification
- Kingdom: Plantae
- Clade: Tracheophytes
- Clade: Angiosperms
- Clade: Eudicots
- Clade: Asterids
- Order: Dipsacales
- Family: Caprifoliaceae
- Genus: Bassecoia; B.L.Burtt

Synonyms
- Pterocephalodes V.Mayer & Ehrend.

Genus of flowering plants

Bassecoia is a genus of flowering plants belonging to the family Caprifoliaceae. It is also in the subfamily of Dipsacoideae.

Its native range is Nepal to Southern Central China and Northern Indo-China.

Known species:

- Bassecoia bretschneideri (Batalin) B.L.Burtt
- Bassecoia hookeri (C.B.Clarke) V.Mayer & Ehrend.
- Bassecoia siamensis (Craib) B.L.Burtt
