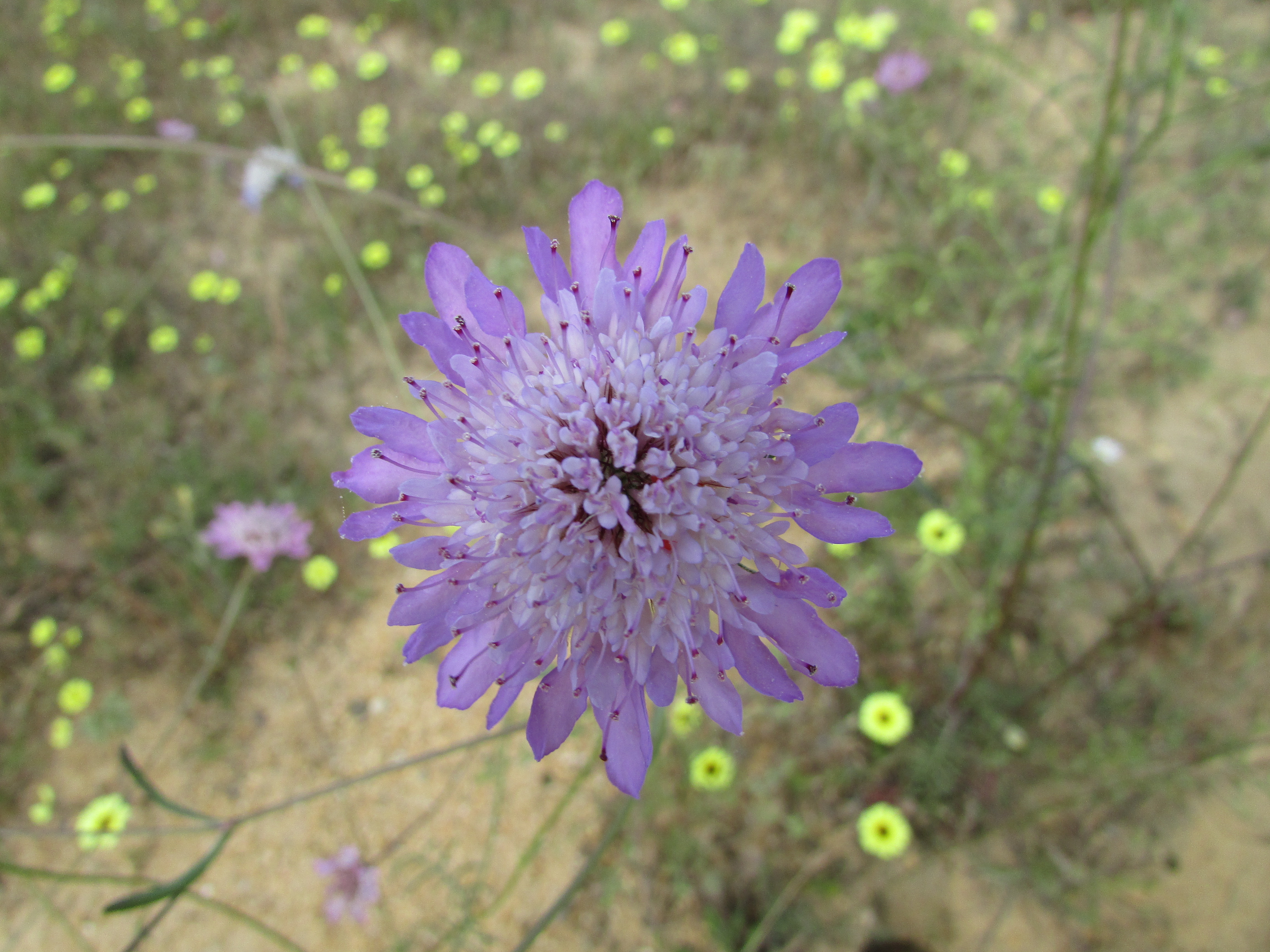
- Pycnocomon intermedium between Branqueira and Olhos de Água, Algarve in Portugal.

Scientific classification
- Kingdom: Plantae
- Clade: Embryophytes
- Clade: Tracheophytes
- Clade: Spermatophytes
- Clade: Angiosperms
- Clade: Eudicots
- Clade: Asterids
- Order: Dipsacales
- Family: Caprifoliaceae
- Genus: Pycnocomon; Hoffmanns. & Link

= Pycnocomon =

Genus of plants

Pycnocomon is a genus of flowering plants belonging to the family Caprifoliaceae. They were formerly placed in the defunct family of Dipsacaceae.

It is native to the Mediterranean and found in the countries of Algeria, Corsica, Greece, Italy, Morocco, Portugal, Sardinia, Sicily, Spain and Tunisia.

It was first published in Fl. Portug. vol.2 on page 93 in 1820.

It was included in genus Scabiosa L. for a long time but molecular data demonstrated that genera Pycnocomon and Lomelosia (another Scabiosa-like genus) form a clade distinct from Scabiosa.

In 2017, a new species from the family Eriophyidae, the gall mites, Aceria pycnocomi was found on Pycnocomon rutifolium in Spain.

Pycnocomon rutifolium in Spain was screened for Anticancer activity in 2021.

== Species ==
As accepted by Plants of the World Online;

| Image | Scientific name | Distribution |
|---|---|---|
| | Pycnocomon intermedium (Lag.) Greuter & Burdet | Central & S. Portugal to S. Spain |
| | Pycnocomon rutifolium (Vahl) Hoffmanns. & Link | Algeria, Corse, Greece, Italy, Morocco, Portugal, Sardegna, Sicilia, Spain, Tunisia |
