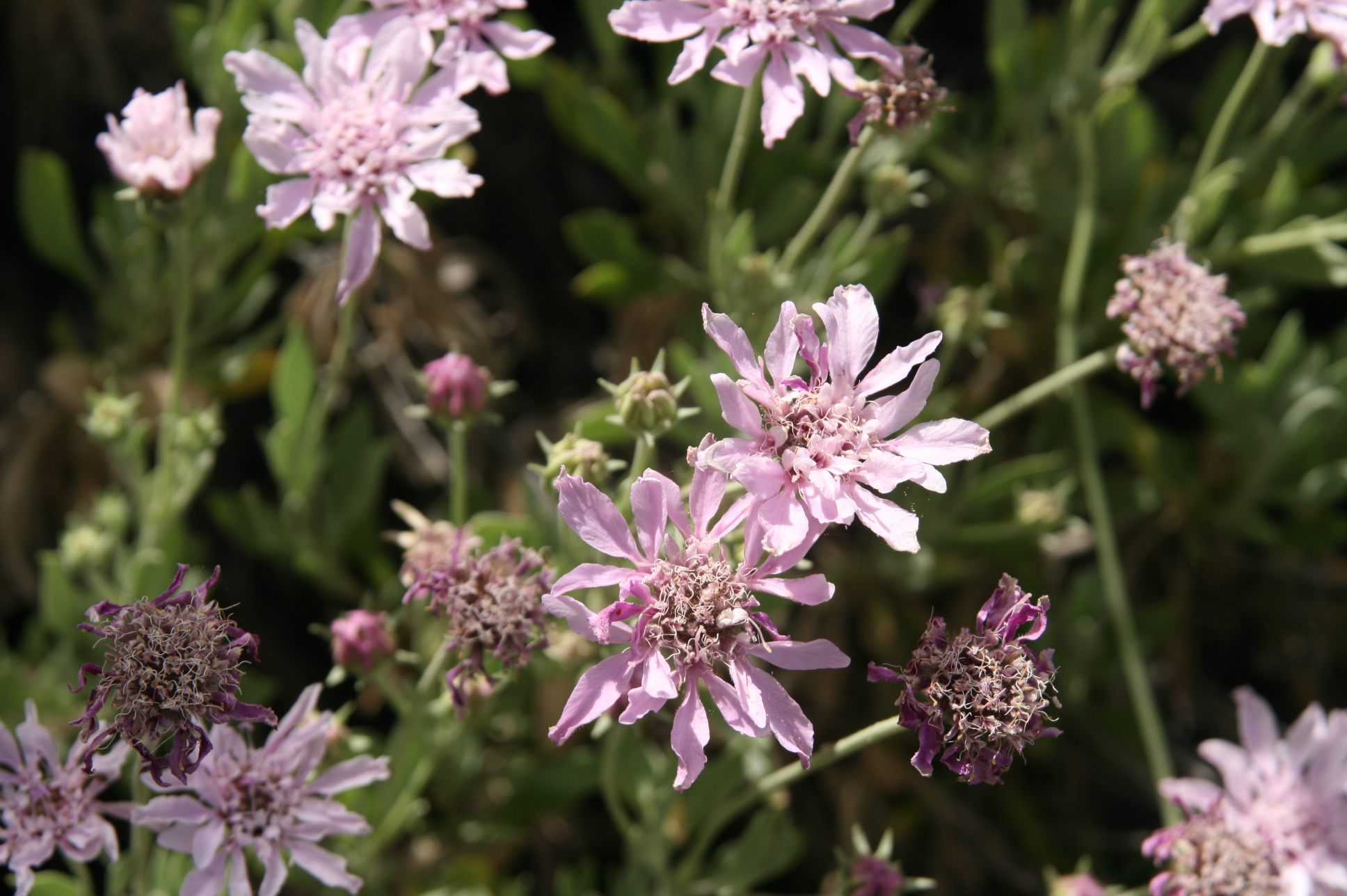

Scientific classification
- Kingdom: Plantae
- Clade: Tracheophytes
- Clade: Angiosperms
- Clade: Eudicots
- Clade: Asterids
- Order: Dipsacales
- Family: Caprifoliaceae
- Genus: Pterocephalus
- Species: P. lasiospermus

Binomial name
- Pterocephalus lasiospermus Link ex Buch

= Pterocephalus lasiospermus =

Rosalillo de cumbre

Species of shrub

Pterocephalus lasiospermus (rosalillo de cumbre) is a species of shrub in the family Caprifoliaceae.

== Etymology ==
lasiospermus: lasios from the Greek, meaning "hairy" and sperma, meaning "seed", referring to it pappus. The Spanish common name means "summit rosebush" in English.

== Geographic distribution ==
Endemic to Cañadas del Teide depression on Tenerife and the scrub of the upper zones of the surrounding pine forest. Before the creation of the Teide National Park it was very scarce due to the damage from livestock pasturing.

== Description ==
Form is a shrub up to one meter in height. Its stems are grey, with simple leaves of pale green-grey, both are hairy. The inflorescence is a cushion-like head of pale pink flowers at the end of long stems. It blooms in early summer, which is late with respect to other species in its environment. As summer progresses, the flower head becomes a ball of whitish chaffy seeds.
