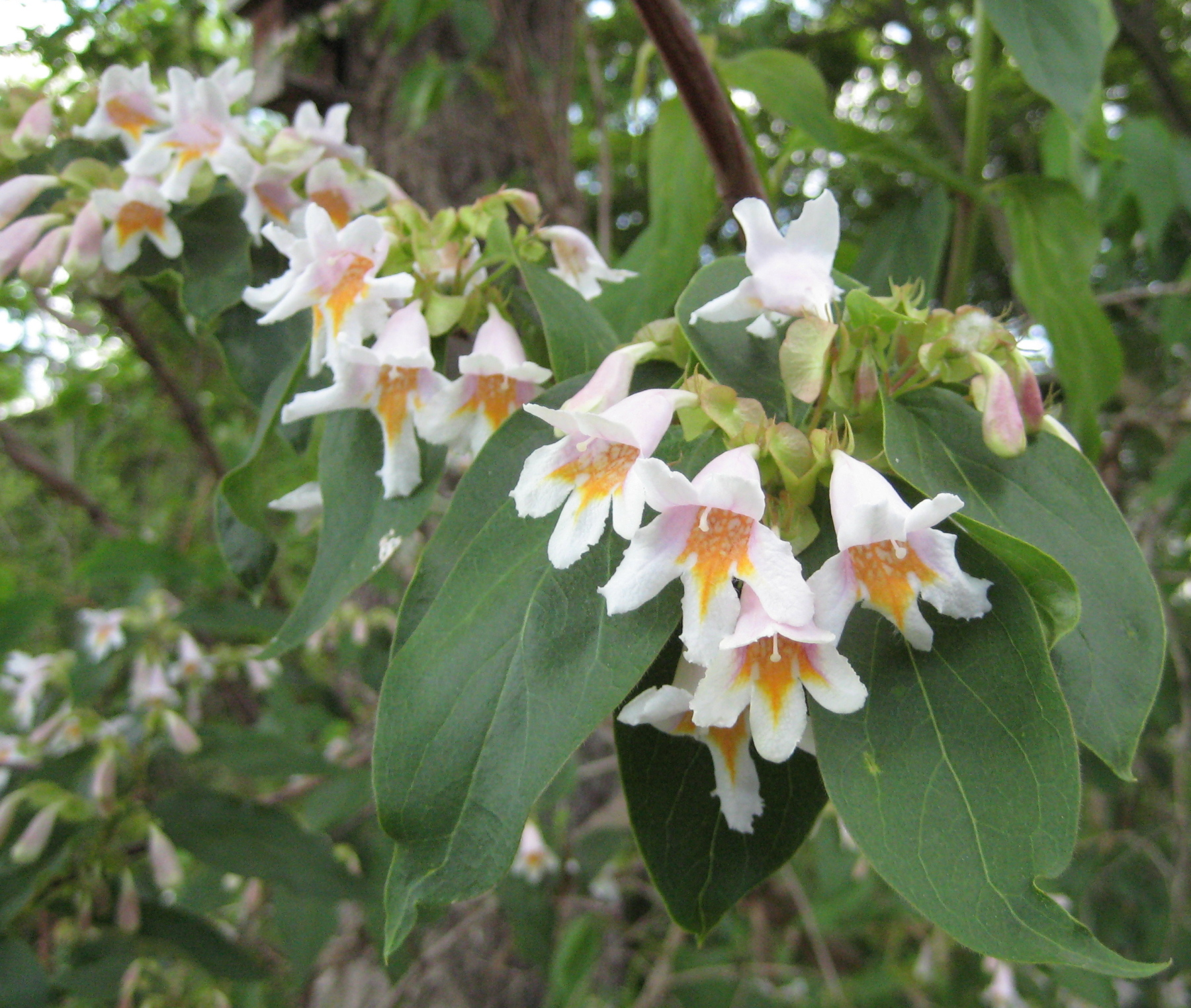

Conservation status
- Least Concern (IUCN 3.1)

Scientific classification
- Kingdom: Plantae
- Clade: Embryophytes
- Clade: Tracheophytes
- Clade: Spermatophytes
- Clade: Angiosperms
- Clade: Eudicots
- Clade: Asterids
- Order: Dipsacales
- Family: Caprifoliaceae
- Genus: Dipelta
- Species: D. floribunda

Binomial name
- Dipelta floribunda Maxim. (1877)

Varieties
- Dipelta floribunda var. dunniana (H.Lév.) Landrein; Dipelta floribunda var. floribunda; Dipelta floribunda var. wenxianensis (Yi F.Wang & Y.S.Lian) Landrein

Synonyms
- Linnaea dipelta Christenh. (2013)

= Dipelta floribunda =

Species of flowering plant

Dipelta floribunda, synonym Linnaea dipelta, is a species of deciduous shrub in the family Caprifoliaceae. It is native to central and east-central China. In late spring and early summer it produces masses of white trumpet-shaped flowers with orange throats.

Three varieties are accepted.

- Dipelta floribunda var. dunniana (H.Lév.) Landrein
- Dipelta floribunda var. floribunda
- Dipelta floribunda var. wenxianensis (Yi F.Wang & Y.S.Lian) Landrein

In cultivation it prefers alkaline soils with full sun or partial shade. It has received the Royal Horticultural Society's Award of Garden Merit.

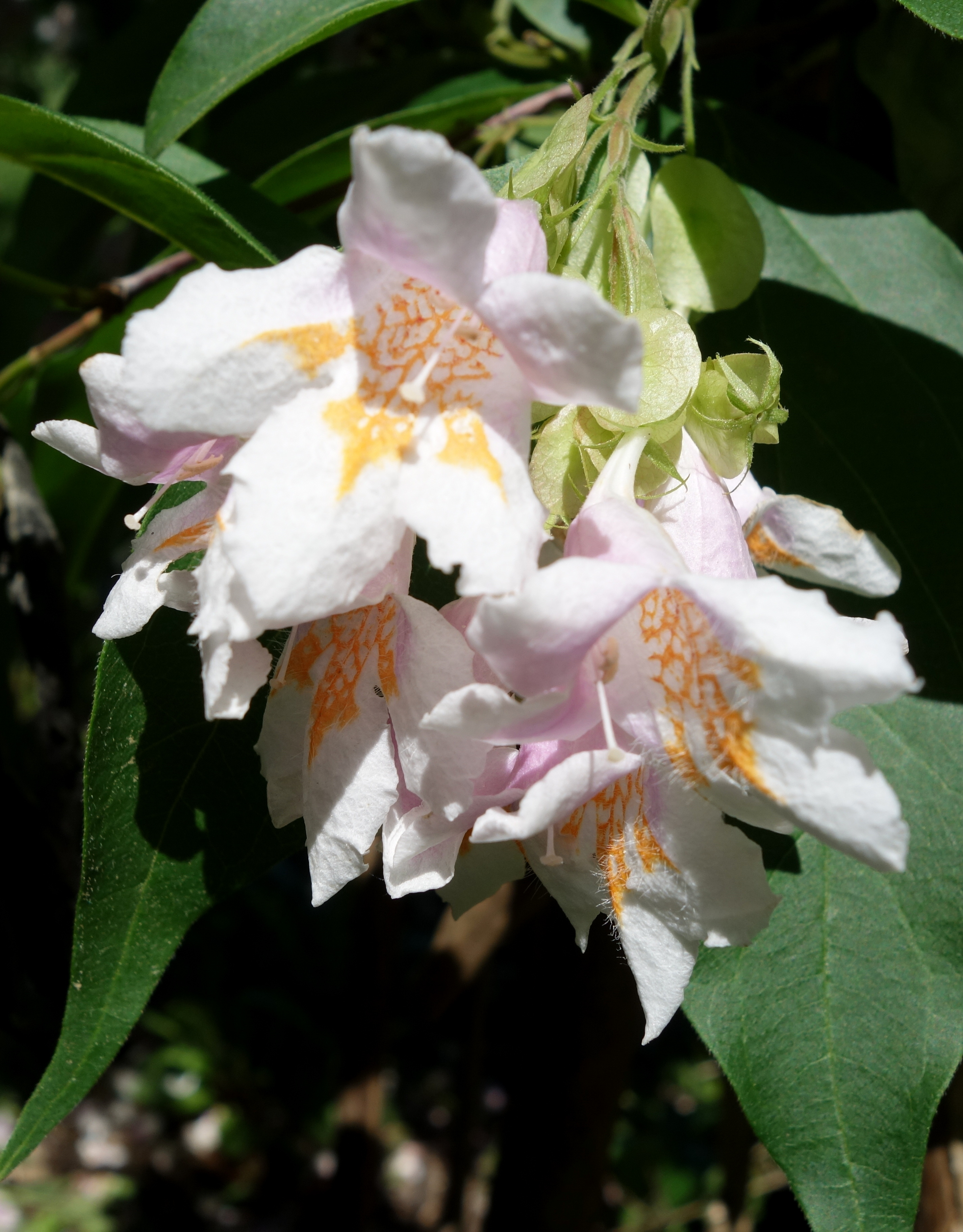

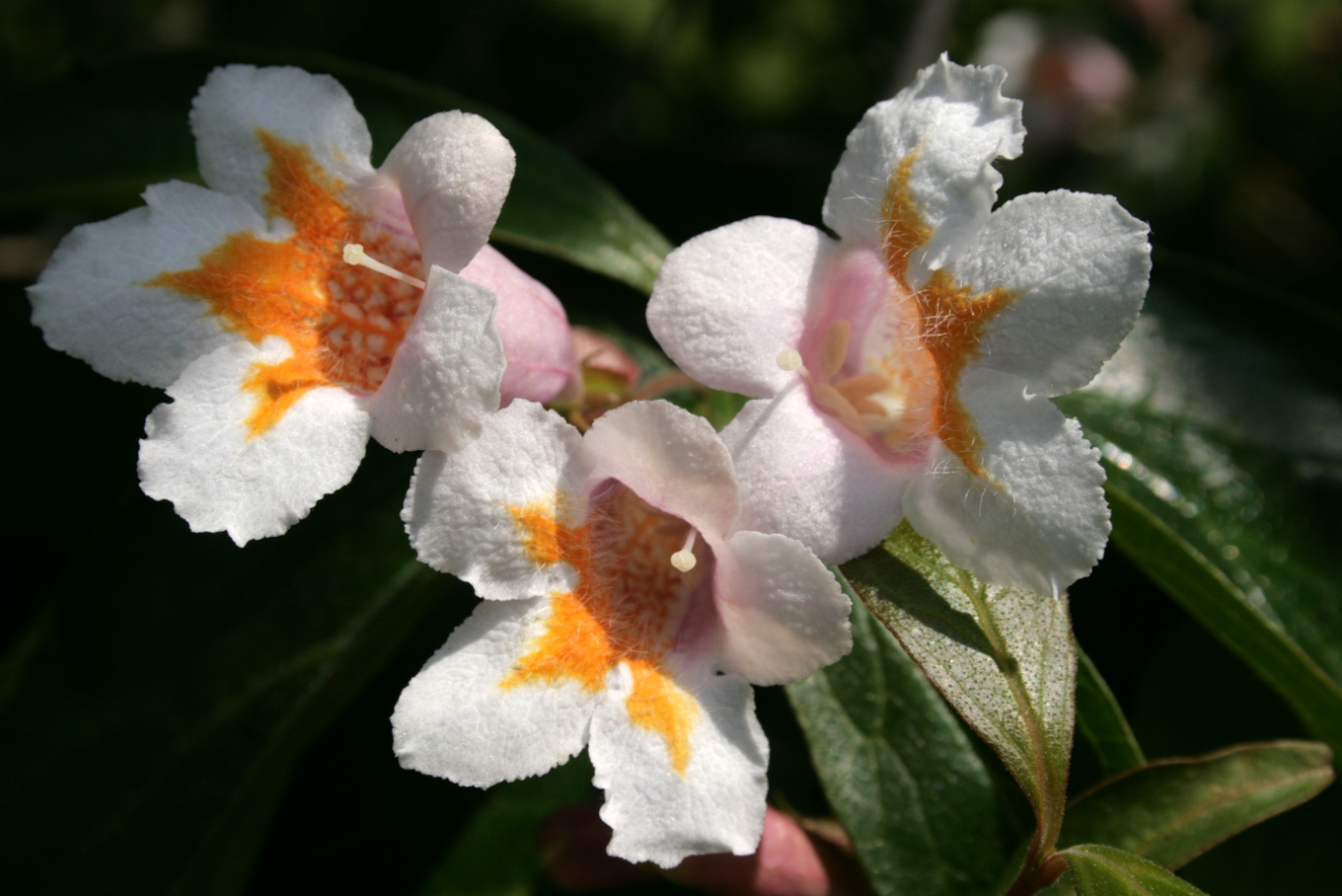
