= Delonix velutina =

Conservation status
- Endangered (IUCN 3.1)

Scientific classification
- Kingdom: Plantae
- Clade: Tracheophytes
- Clade: Angiosperms
- Clade: Eudicots
- Clade: Rosids
- Order: Fabales
- Family: Fabaceae
- Subfamily: Caesalpinioideae
- Genus: Delonix
- Species: D. velutina

Binomial name
- Delonix velutina Capuron

Species of legume

Delonix velutina is a species of plant in the family Fabaceae. It is found only in Madagascar.
