= Dioscorea floribunda =

Scientific classification
- Kingdom: Plantae
- Clade: Embryophytes
- Clade: Tracheophytes
- Clade: Spermatophytes
- Clade: Angiosperms
- Clade: Monocots
- Order: Dioscoreales
- Family: Dioscoreaceae
- Genus: Dioscorea
- Species: D. floribunda

Binomial name
- Dioscorea floribunda M.Martens & Galeotti

Synonyms
- Dioscorea barclayi R.Knuth

Species of flowering plant

Dioscorea floribunda, the medicinal yam or mule's-hoof, is a species of flowering plant in the family Dioscoreaceae. It is found from central Mexico to northern Central America. It is grown commercially for its diosgenin content.
