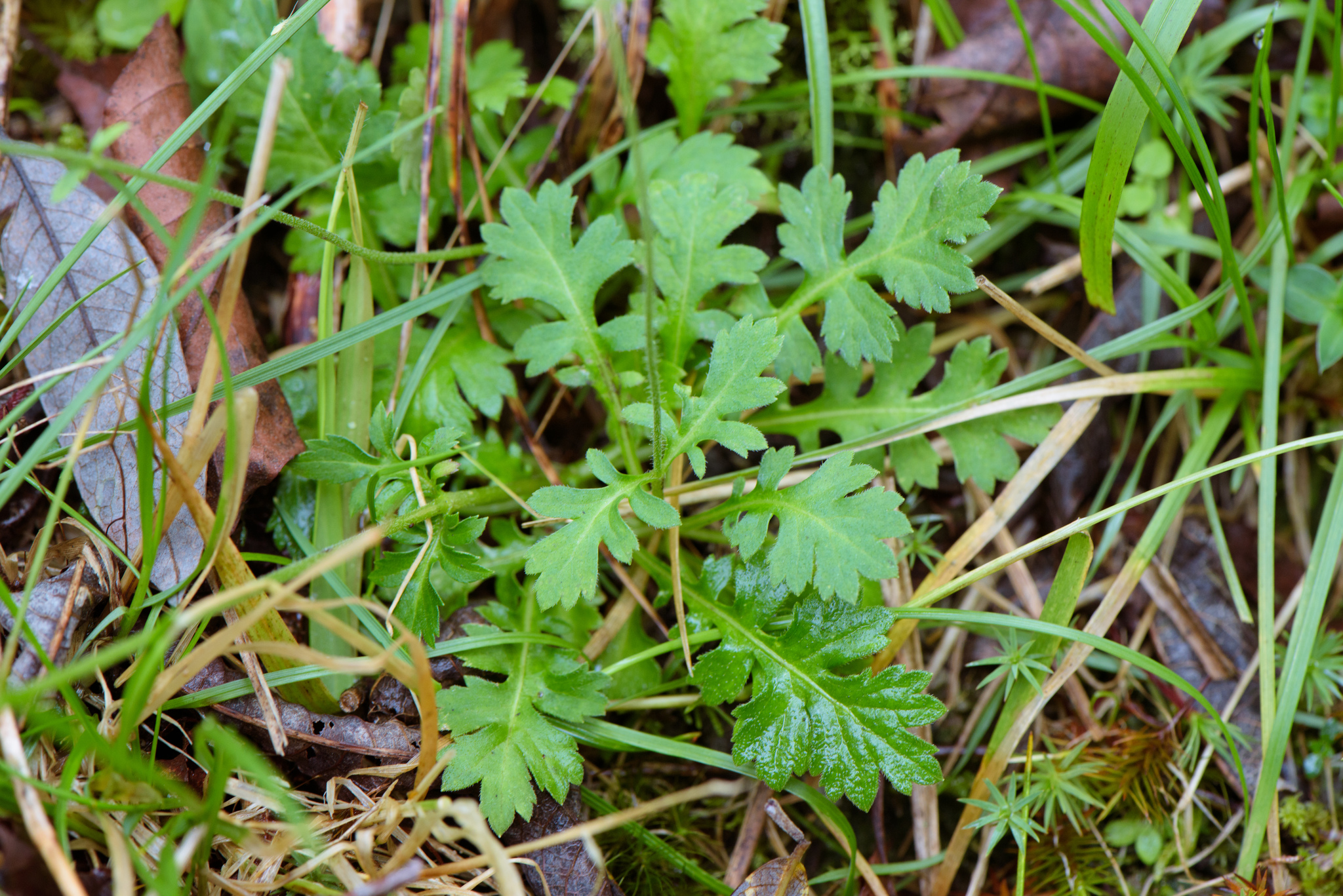
- Triplostegia glandulifera

Scientific classification
- Kingdom: Plantae
- Clade: Tracheophytes
- Clade: Angiosperms
- Clade: Eudicots
- Clade: Asterids
- Order: Dipsacales
- Family: Caprifoliaceae
- Genus: Triplostegia; Wall. ex DC. (1830)
- Species: T. glandulifera

Binomial name
- Triplostegia glandulifera Wall. ex DC. (1830)

Synonyms
- Hoeckia Engl. & Graebn. ex Diels (1901); Hoeckia aschersoniana Engl. & Graebn. (1901); Triplostegia aschersoniana (Engl. & Graebn.) Diels (1912), opus utique oppr.; Triplostegia delavayi Franch. ex Diels (1912); Triplostegia epilobiifolia H.Lév.(1915); Triplostegia grandiflora Gagnep. (1900); Triplostegia repens Hemsl. (1899)

= Triplostegia =

Genus of flowering plants

Triplostegia glandulifera is a species of flowering plant belonging to the family Caprifoliaceae. It is one of the two species in genus Triplostegia. with Triplostegia grandiflora. It is a perennial native to the Himalayas, Myanmar, central China, Taiwan, central Sulawesi, and New Guinea.
