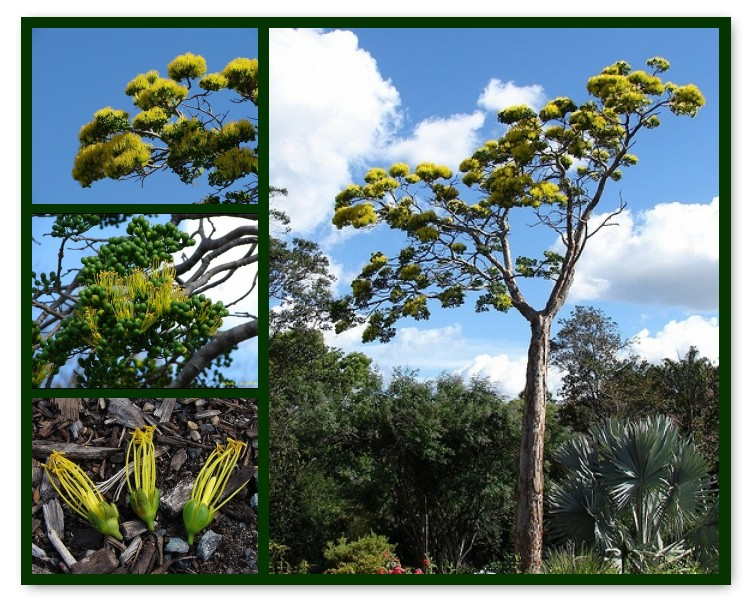

Conservation status
- Least Concern (IUCN 3.1)

Scientific classification
- Kingdom: Plantae
- Clade: Tracheophytes
- Clade: Angiosperms
- Clade: Eudicots
- Clade: Rosids
- Order: Fabales
- Family: Fabaceae
- Subfamily: Caesalpinioideae
- Genus: Delonix
- Species: D. floribunda

Binomial name
- Delonix floribunda (Baill.) Capuron

Synonyms
- Aprevalia floribunda Baill. Aprevalia perrieri R.Vig. Delonix adansonioides (R.Vig.) Capuron; Poinciana adansonioides R.Vig.

= Delonix floribunda =

Species of legume

Delonix floribunda is a species of plant in the family Fabaceae. It is found only in Madagascar.

It has very large flat heads of yellow flowers in late spring. It is grown as a showy ornamental in rich soil in a temperate to tropical climate. It can be propagated from seed.
