= Pterothamnus =

Scientific classification
- Kingdom: Plantae
- Clade: Tracheophytes
- Clade: Angiosperms
- Clade: Eudicots
- Clade: Asterids
- Order: Dipsacales
- Family: Caprifoliaceae
- Genus: Pterothamnus; V.Mayer & Ehrend. (2013)
- Species: P. centennii

Binomial name
- Pterothamnus centennii (M.J.Cannon) V.Mayer & Ehrend. (2013)

Synonyms
- Pterocephalus centennii M.J.Cannon (1980-1981 publ. 1981)

Genus of flowering plants

Pterothamnus centennii is a species of flowering plant in the honeysuckle family, Caprifoliaceae. It is the sole species in genus Pterothamnus. It is a subshrub or shrub endemic to the Tsetsera Plateau in the Eastern Highlands of Mozambique.
