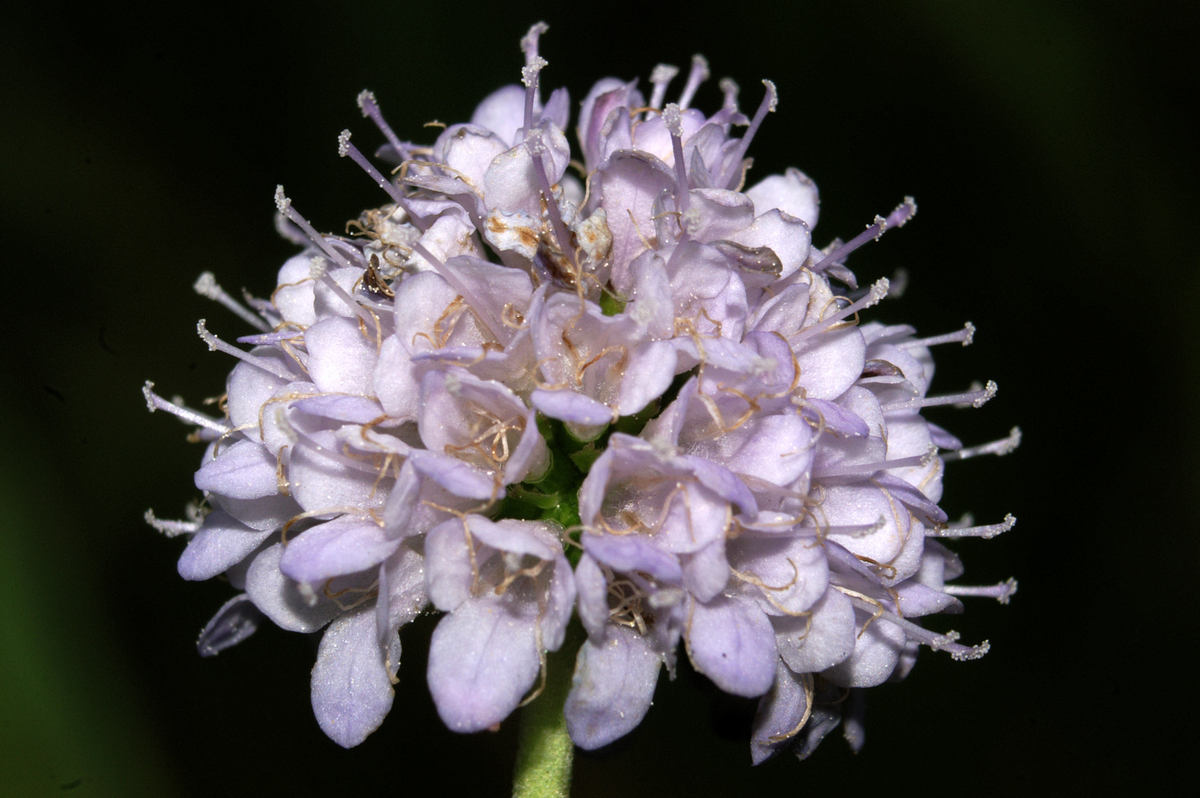
- Succisella inflexa (southern succisella)

Scientific classification
- Kingdom: Plantae
- Clade: Embryophytes
- Clade: Tracheophytes
- Clade: Spermatophytes
- Clade: Angiosperms
- Clade: Eudicots
- Clade: Asterids
- Order: Dipsacales
- Family: Caprifoliaceae
- Subfamily: Dipsacoideae
- Genus: Succisella; Beck (1893)

Species
- 5; see text

= Succisella =

Genus of flowering plants in the honeysuckle family

Succisella is a genus of flowering plants in the family Caprifoliaceae. There are four or five species in the genus. They are all native to Europe; three are endemic to the Iberian Peninsula.

== Species ==
Five species are accepted.

- Succisella andreae-molinae Pajarón & Escudero – Spain
- Succisella carvalhoana (Mariz) Baksay – west-central Portugal
- Succisella inflexa (Kluk) Beck – southern succisella, Italy to Poland, Belarus, Ukraine, Albania, and the Caucasus
- Succisella microcephala (Willk.) Beck – west-central Spain
- Succisella petteri (J.Kern. & Murb.) Beck – Albania and former Yugoslavia

== Etymology ==
Succisella ostensibly means ‘cut off from below’ or ‘abruptly ending’.
