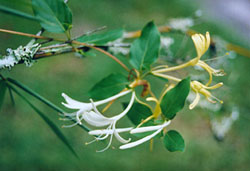
- Lonicera japonica

Scientific classification
- Kingdom: Plantae
- Clade: Tracheophytes
- Clade: Angiosperms
- Clade: Eudicots
- Clade: Asterids
- Order: Dipsacales
- Family: Caprifoliaceae; Juss.

Type genus
- Lonicera

Genera
- See text

Synonyms
- Dipsacaceae Juss., Gen. Pl. [Jussieu] 194. 1789 [4 Aug 1789] (1789) nom. cons. Valerianaceae Batsch, Tab. Affin. Regni Veg. 227. 1802 [2 May 1802] (1802) nom. cons.

= Caprifoliaceae =

Family of flowering plants

The Caprifoliaceae or honeysuckle family is a clade of dicotyledonous flowering plants consisting of about 860 species in 33 to 42 genera, with a nearly cosmopolitan distribution. Centres of diversity are found in eastern North America and eastern Asia, while they are absent in tropical and southern Africa.

== Description ==
The flowering plants in this clade are mostly shrubs and vines: rarely herbs. They include some ornamental garden plants grown in temperate regions. The leaves are mostly opposite with no stipules (appendages at the base of a leafstalk or petiole), and may be either evergreen or deciduous. The flowers are tubular funnel-shaped or bell-like, usually with five outward spreading lobes or points, and are often fragrant. They usually form a small calyx with small bracts. The fruit is in most cases a berry or a drupe. The genera Diervilla and Weigela have capsular fruit, while Heptacodium has an achene.

== Taxonomy ==
Views of the family-level classification of the traditionally accepted Caprifoliaceae and other plants in the botanical order Dipsacales have been considerably revised in recent decades. Most botanists now accept the placement of two of the most familiar members of this group, the elderberries (Sambucus) and the viburnums (Viburnum), in the family Adoxaceae instead; these were formerly classified here. 33 genera are currently accepted.

Several other families of the more broadly treated Caprifoliaceae s.l. are separated by some but not all authors; these are treated as subfamilies in the listing of genera below, along with estimated numbers of species.

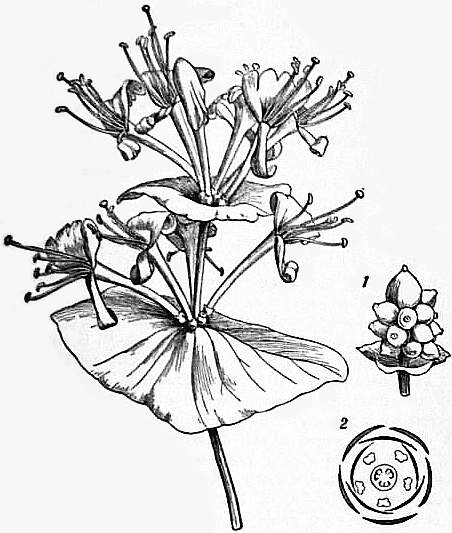
Flowering shoot of Lonicera caprifolium. 1, Fruit; 2, horizontal plan of flower.

Subfamily Diervilloideae

- Diervilla Tourn. ex Mill. – bush honeysuckle, 3 species
- Weigela Thunb. – 10 species

Subfamily Caprifolioideae s.s.

- Heptacodium Rehder – seven-son flower, 1 species
- Leycesteria Wall. – 7 species
- Lonicera L. – honeysuckle, 158 species
- Symphoricarpos Duhamel – snowberry, 15 species
- Triosteum L. – horse gentian, 6 species

Subfamily Dipsacoideae

  - × Succisoknautia Baksay – 1 species
  - Triplostegia Wall. ex DC. – 1 species
- Tribe Bassecoieae
  - Bassecoia B.L.Burtt – 3 species
- Tribe Dipsaceae
  - Cephalaria Schrad. – 102 species
  - Dipsacus L. – teasel, 21 species
- Tribe Knautieae
  - Knautia L. – 55 species
- Tribe Pseudoscabioseae
  - Pseudoscabiosa Devesa – 3 species
- Tribe Pterocephalidieae
  - Pterocephalidium G.López – 1 species
  - Pterothamnus Vaill. ex Adans. – 1 species
- Tribe Succiseae
  - Succisa Haller - 3 species
  - Succisella Beck – 5 species

Subfamily Scabiosoideae

- Tribe Scabioseae
  - Pterocephalus Vaill. ex Adans. – 34 species
  - Scabiosa L. – scabious or pincushion flower, 68 species
- Tribe Lomelosieae
  - Lomelosia Raf. – 63 species
  - Pycnocomon Hoffmanns. & Link – 2 species

Subfamily Linnaeoideae

- Abelia R.Br. – 6 species
- Diabelia Landrein – 4 species
- Dipelta Maxim. – 3 species
- Kolkwitzia Graebn. – beautybush, 1 species
- Linnaea Gronov. ex L. – twinflower, 1 species
- Vesalea M.Martens & Galeotti – 6 species

Subfamily Morinoideae

- Morina L. – 14 species
- Zabelia (Rehder) Makino – 8 species

Subfamily Valerianoideae

- Nardostachys DC. – 1 species
- Patrinia Juss. – 14 species
- Valeriana L. – valerians, 426 species
- Valerianella Mill. – cornsalads, 28 species

== Uses ==
The plants belonging to this family are mainly hardy shrubs or vines of ornamental value, many of which are popular garden shrubs, notably species belonging to the genera Abelia, Lonicera, and Weigela. Valerianella locusta is cultivated for use in food. Plants belonging to the family are sometimes used in Traditional Chinese Medicine (TCM).

A few, however, have become invasive weeds outside their native ranges (such as Lonicera japonica).

== Other sources ==
- Flowering Plants of the World, 1987, Vernon H. Heywood, Andromeda Oxford Ltd., ISBN 90-5210-165-5
- Botanica, Gordon Cheers, Random House Australia, ISBN 3-8290-1953-X
