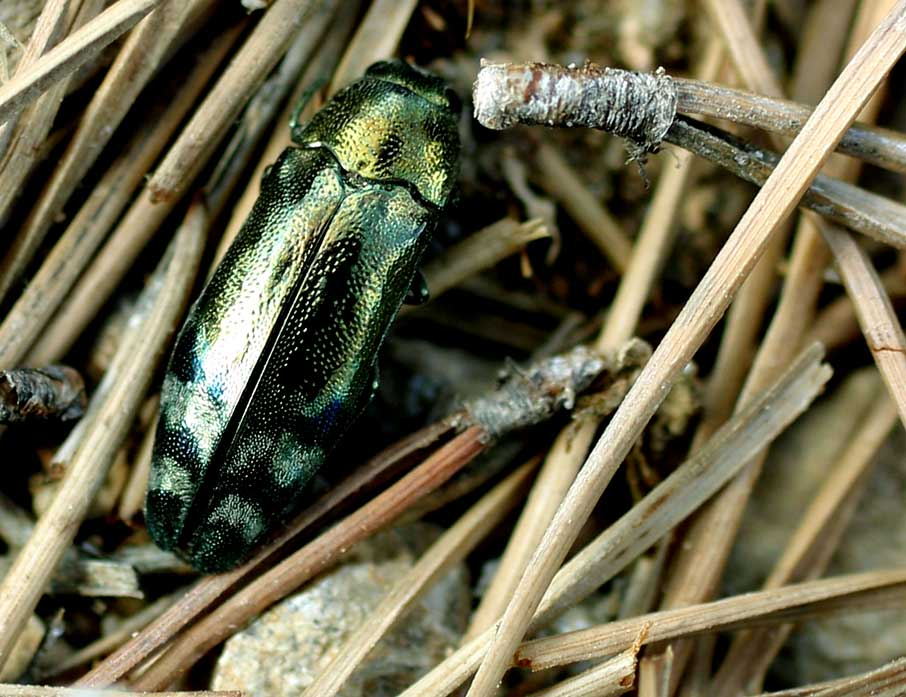
- Coraebus florentinus

Scientific classification
- Domain: Eukaryota
- Kingdom: Animalia
- Phylum: Arthropoda
- Class: Insecta
- Order: Coleoptera
- Suborder: Polyphaga
- Infraorder: Elateriformia
- Superfamily: Buprestoidea
- Family: Buprestidae
- Subfamily: Agrilinae
- Tribe: Coraebini
- Subtribe: Coraebina; Bedel, 1921

= Coraebina =

Subtribe of beetles

Coraebina is a subtribe of metallic wood-boring beetles in the family Buprestidae, subfamily Agrilinae.

== Genera ==
- Belgaumia Kerremans, 1903
- Brachycoraebus Kerremans, 1903
- Cisseicoraebus Kerremans, 1903
- Coraebosoma Obenberger, 1923
- Coraebus Gory & Laporte, 1839
- Eupristocerus Deyrolle, 1864
- Mundaria Kerremans, 1894
- Philocoroebus Bellamy, 1991
