= C15H22O3 =

The molecular formula C_{15}H_{22}O_{3} (molar mass: 255.33 g/mol) may refer to:

- Gemfibrozil, an oral drug used to lower lipid levels
- Nardosinone, a sesquiterpene
- Octyl salicylate, an ingredient in sunscreens
- Sterpuric acid, a sesquiterpene
- Xanthoxin, a carotenoid
