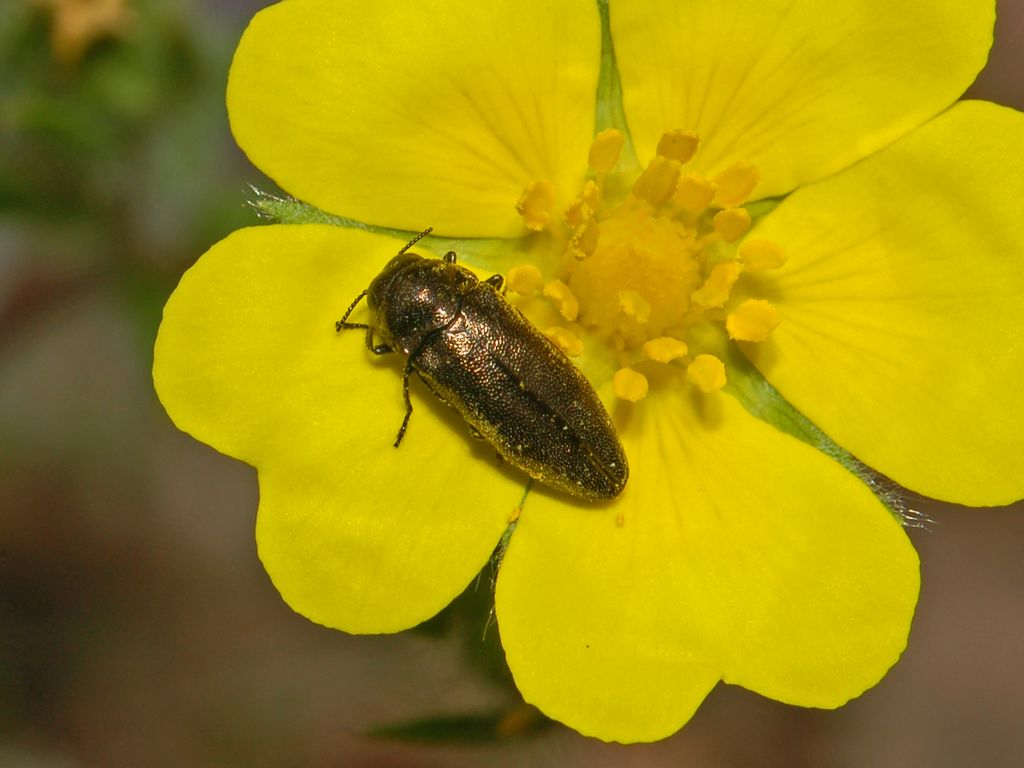

Scientific classification
- Kingdom: Animalia
- Phylum: Arthropoda
- Class: Insecta
- Order: Coleoptera
- Suborder: Polyphaga
- Infraorder: Elateriformia
- Family: Buprestidae
- Genus: Coraebus
- Species: C. elatus

Binomial name
- Coraebus elatus (Fabricius, 1787)

Synonyms
- Coraebus lampsanae (Bonelli, 1804); Anthaxia sinuatus (Creutzer, 1796)

= Coraebus elatus =

Species of beetle

Coraebus elatus is a species of jewel beetles belonging to the family Buprestidae, subfamily Agrilinae.

This beetle is present in most of Europe, in the Near East, and in the eastern Palearctic realm.

Main larval host plants are in genera Agrimonia, Filipendula, Fragaria, Lapsana, Potentilla, Poterium and Sanguisorba.

The length of adults varies from 4.5 to 7.2 millimetres (0.18 to 0.28 in).

== Subspecies ==
- Coraebus elatus elatus (Fabricius, 1787)
- Coraebus elatus repletus (Abeille de Perrin, 1893)
