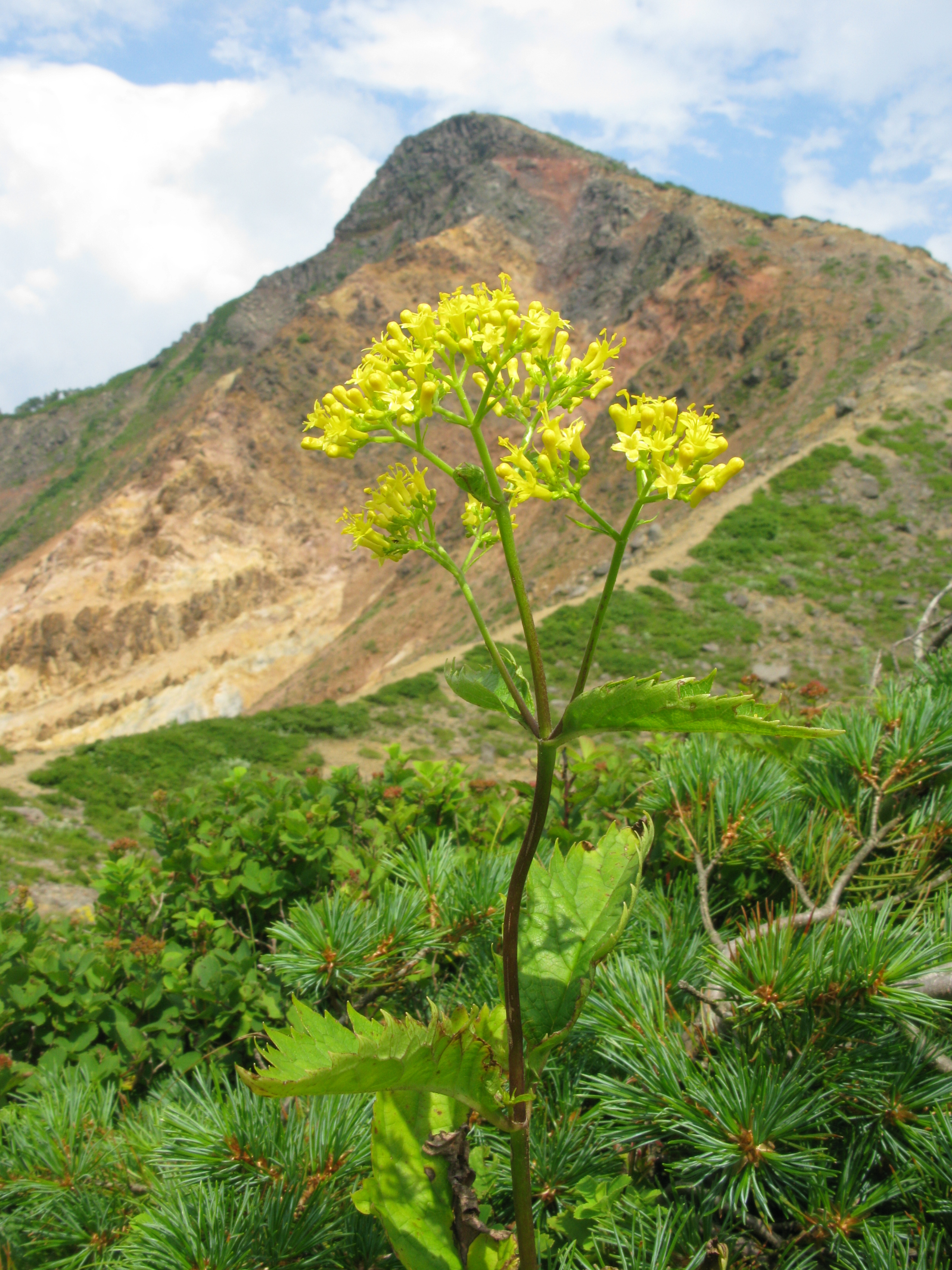
- On Mount Bandai
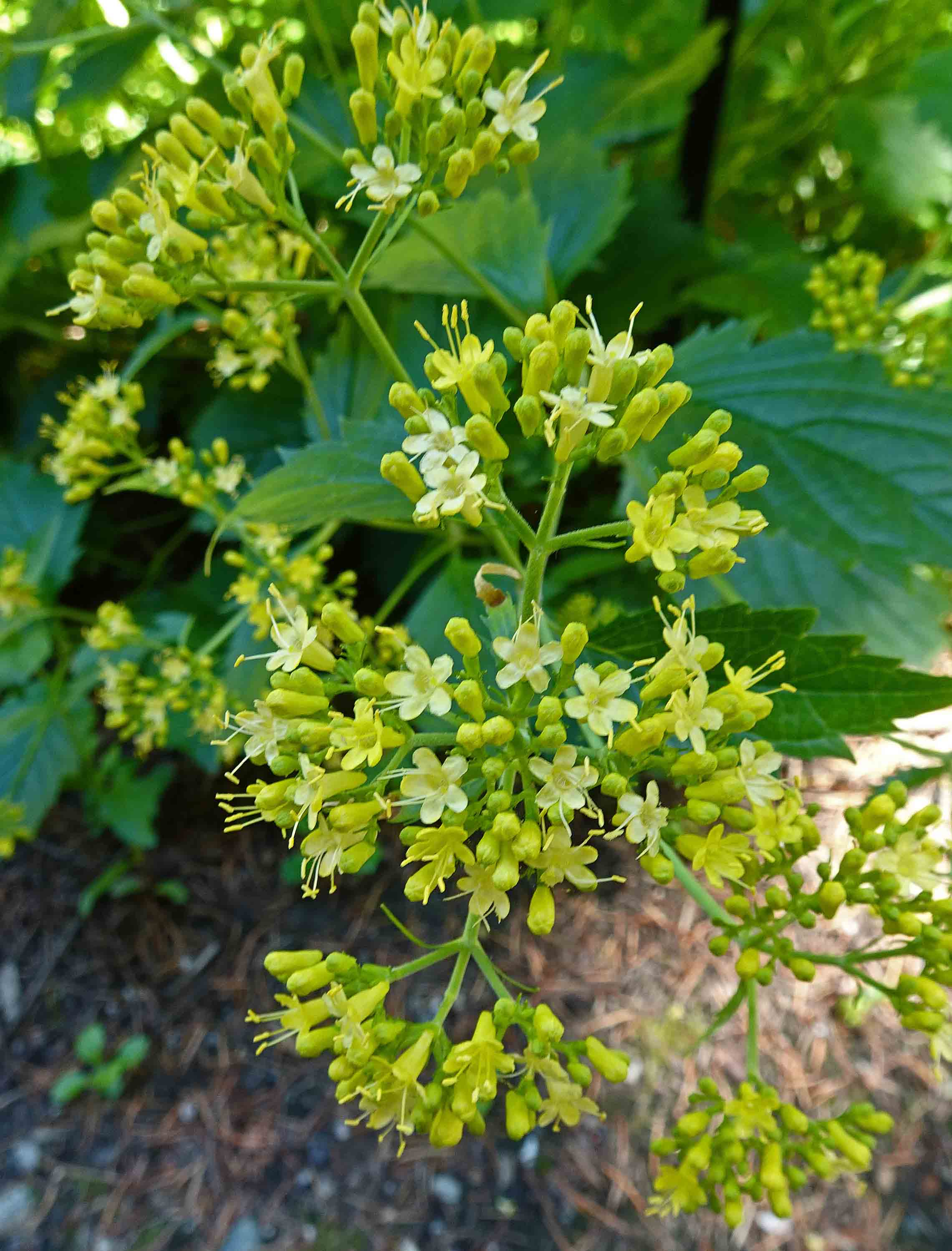
- Close-up of flowers at VanDusen Botanical Garden

Scientific classification
- Kingdom: Plantae
- Clade: Embryophytes
- Clade: Tracheophytes
- Clade: Spermatophytes
- Clade: Angiosperms
- Clade: Eudicots
- Clade: Asterids
- Order: Dipsacales
- Family: Caprifoliaceae
- Genus: Patrinia
- Species: P. gibbosa

Binomial name
- Patrinia gibbosa Maxim.

Synonyms
- Fedia gibbosa (Maxim.) Kuntze

= Patrinia gibbosa =

Species of flowering plant

Patrinia gibbosa, the swollen patrinia, is a species of flowering plant in the family Caprifoliaceae, native to northern Japan and the Kuril Islands. A clumping perennial, it is smaller than the better-known Patrinia scabiosifolia.
