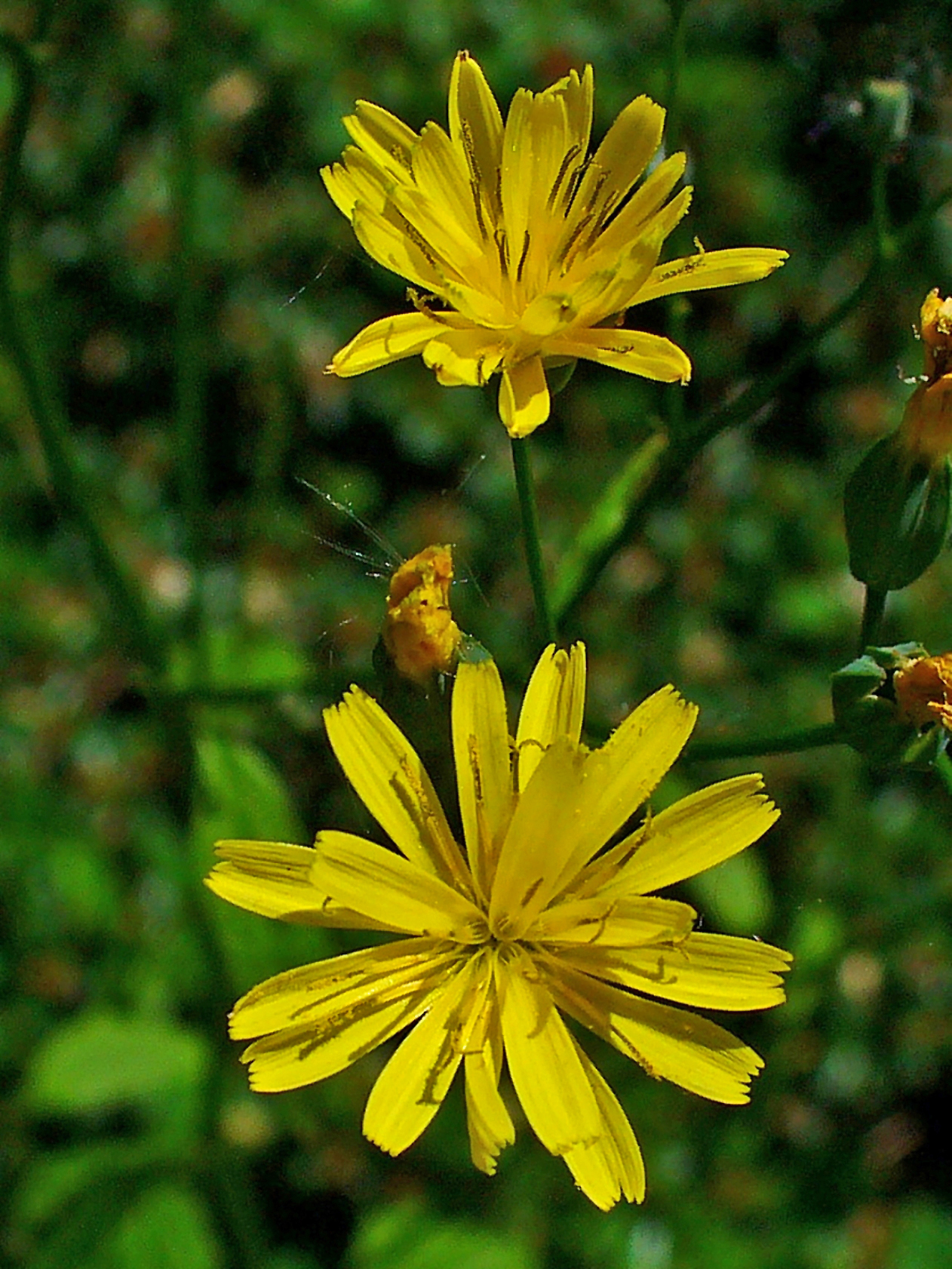

Scientific classification
- Kingdom: Plantae
- Clade: Embryophytes
- Clade: Tracheophytes
- Clade: Angiosperms
- Clade: Eudicots
- Clade: Asterids
- Order: Asterales
- Family: Asteraceae
- Genus: Lapsana
- Species: L. communis

Binomial name
- Lapsana communis L.

Synonyms
- Synonymy: Lapsana cancellata Borbás; Lapsana cappadocica Bornm.; Lapsana crispa Willd.; Lapsana glandulosa (Freyn) Klokov; Lapsana olympica Candargy; Lapsana pubescens Hornem.; Lapsana sonchifolia Gilib.; Lapsana sylvatica Wallr.; Lapsana adenophora Boiss., syn. of subsp. adenophora; Lapsana alpina Boiss. & Balansa, syn. of subsp. alpina; Lapsana glandulifera Cass., syn. of subsp. grandiflora; Lapsana grandiflora M.Bieb., syn. of subsp. grandiflora; Lapsana lyrata Willd., syn. of subsp. grandiflora; Lapsana aipetriensis Vassilcz., syn. of subsp. intermedia; Lapsana intermedia M.Bieb., syn. of subsp. intermedia; Lapsana macrocarpa Coss., syn. of subsp. macrocarpa; Lapsana cassia Boiss., syn. of subsp. pisidica; Lapsana peduncularis Boiss., syn. of subsp. pisidica; Lapsana pisidica Boiss. & Heldr., syn. of subsp. pisidica; Lapsana ramosissima Boiss., syn. of subsp. pisidica

= Lapsana communis =

Species of flowering plant

Lapsana communis, the common nipplewort, is a species of flowering plant in the family Asteraceae. It is native to Europe and southwestern Asia, and it is widely naturalized in other regions including North America.

== Description ==
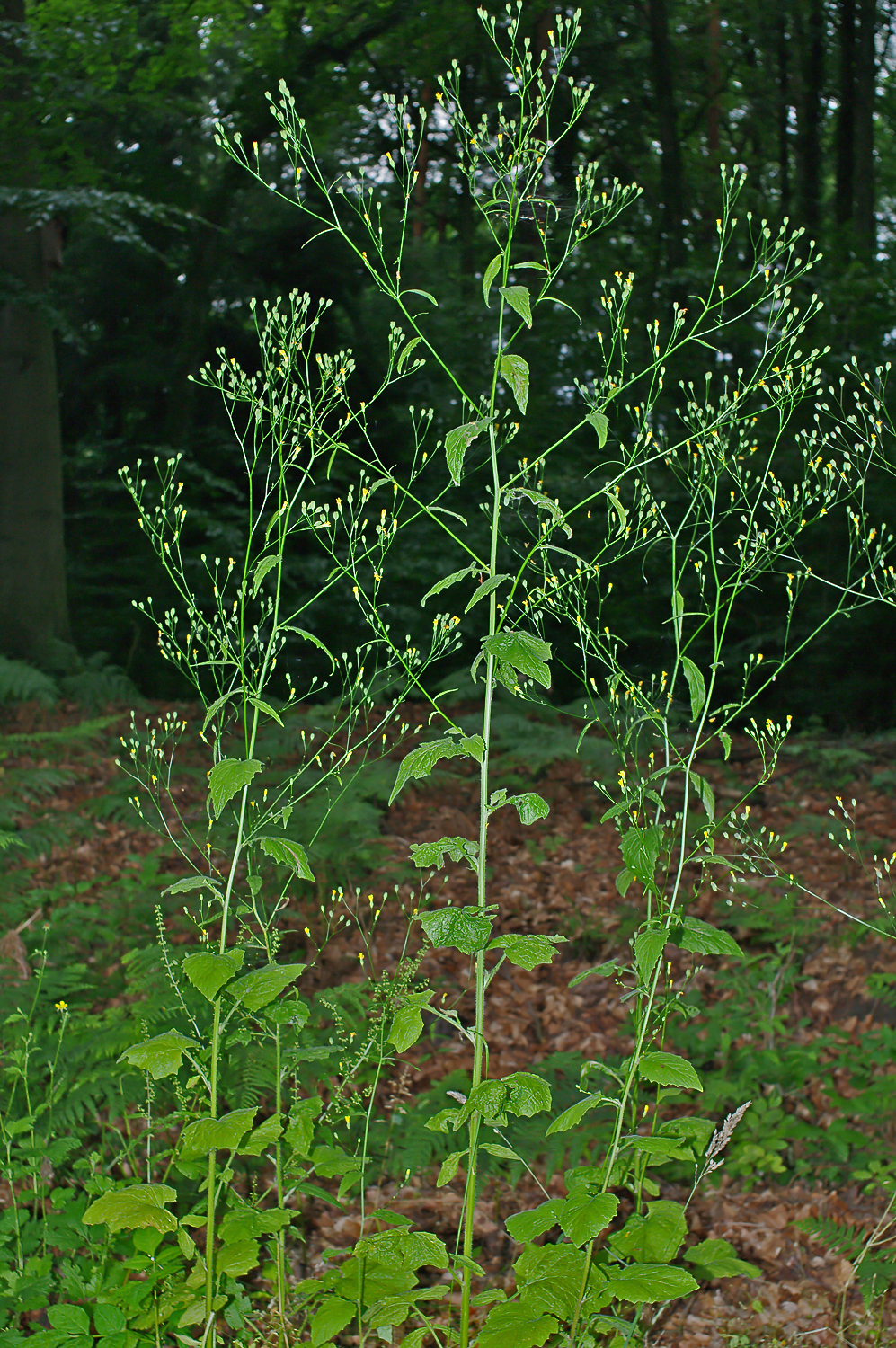
Habitus of full-grown plants

Lapsana communis is an annual or perennial herbaceous plant growing to 1–1.2 m (3 ft 3 in – 3 ft 11 in) tall, with erect, hairy branching stems and milky sap. The leaves are alternate and spirally arranged; the larger leaves at the base of the flowering stem are often pinnate, with a large oval terminal leaflet and one to four small side leaflets, while smaller leaves higher on the stem are simple oval; all leaves have toothed margins. The flowers are yellow, produced in a capitulum 1–2 cm (0.39–0.79 in) diameter, the capitula being numerous in loose clusters at the top of the stem. The capitulum is surrounded by a whorl of involucral bracts, the outer ones very small and the inner ones erect, narrow and stiff and all the same length. The eight to fifteen florets are all ligulate and pale yellow, shaped like a tongue with a five-toothed tip. Each has five stamens and a gynoecium composed of two fused carpels. The fruit is a cypsela surrounded by the hardened remains of the involucral bracts. The numerous small seeds are retained in the cypsela until the plant is shaken by the wind or a passing animal. Pappus is absent.

Subspecies

- Lapsana communis subsp. adenophora (Boiss.) Rech.f. – Southeast Europe
- Lapsana communis subsp. alpina (Boiss. & Balansa) P.D.Sell. – Crimea
- Lapsana communis subsp. communis – most of Europe, except the southeast
- Lapsana communis subsp. grandiflora (M. Bieb.) P.D.Sell. – Southwest Asia
- Lapsana communis subsp. intermedia (M. Bieb.) Hayek. – Southwest Asia, southeast Europe
- Lapsana communis subsp. pisidica (Boiss. & Heldr.) Rech.f. – Greece

== Distribution and habitat ==
Away from its native area, Lapsana communis is common throughout the British Isles, naturalised, and sometimes considered an invasive species, in many areas around the world, including Australia, Chile, New Zealand, Greenland, and most of Canada and the United States.

Lapsana communis is found growing in arable fields, woods, hedges, roadsides, wasteland, hedgerows, woodland margins and clear-felled areas in forests.

== Cultivation and uses ==
The young leaves are edible, and can be used in salads or cooked like spinach. Because of its tiny hairs, some might prefer it mixed with other vegetables. The scientific name comes from lapsane, an edible herb described by Marcus Terentius Varro of ancient Rome. The English name 'nipplewort' was coined in the 17th century as an equivalent of papillaris (from Latin papilla, meaning a nipple), the name used by German apothecaries, since the plant was used to treat cracked nipples and ulcerated breasts, especially under the doctrine of signatures on account of the flower buds' resemblance to nipples.

== See also ==
- Nanakusa-no-sekku
