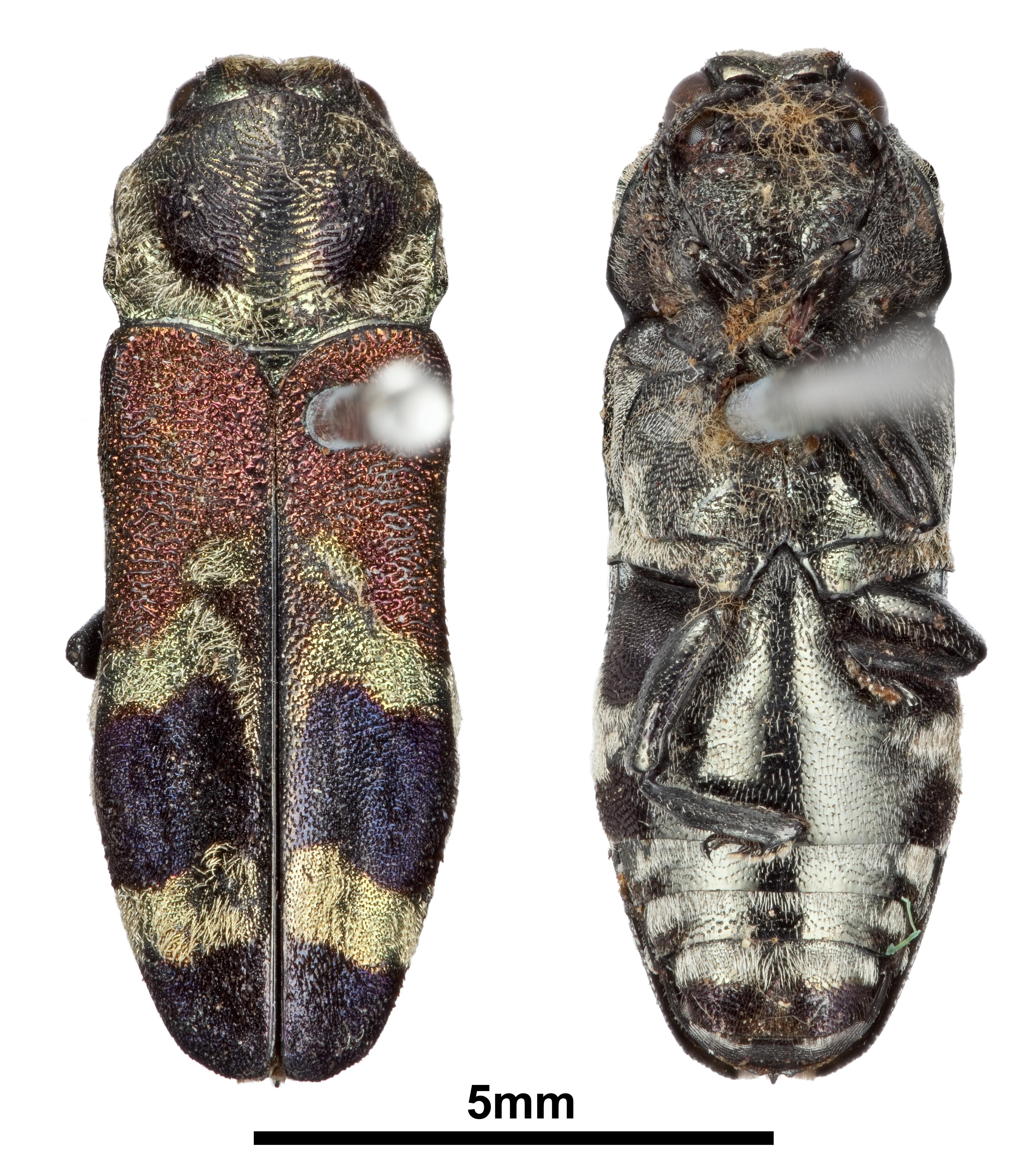
- Polyonychus tricolor

Scientific classification
- Kingdom: Animalia
- Phylum: Arthropoda
- Clade: Pancrustacea
- Class: Insecta
- Order: Coleoptera
- Suborder: Polyphaga
- Infraorder: Elateriformia
- Family: Buprestidae
- Genus: Polyonychus; Chevrolat, 1838

Type species
- Polyonychus mucidus Chevrolat 1838

Diversity
- 6 (see text)

= Polyonychus =

Genus of jewel beetles

Polyonychus is a genus of jewel beetles that belongs to the subfamily Agrilinae. Some species belonging to this genus have been found in Australia.

== Taxonomy ==
This genus was established in 1838 by Louis Alexandre Auguste Chevrolat, a French entomologist that specialized in the study of beetles. It was not accepted as a subgenus of Coraebus by Lacordaire or Kiesenwetter due to characteristics which distinguish it from Coraebus. However Andrew Murray, a Scottish naturalist, thought of Polyonychus as a useful section of Coraebus arguing that it is worthy of being preserved as such because of how many species are within Coraebus.

=== Species ===
There are currently six species that belong to this genus. They are listed below:

- Polyonychus apicalis (Kerremans, 1912)
- Polyonychus dessumi (Descarpentries & Villiers, 1966)
- Polyonychus mucidus Chevrolat, 1838 (Type species)
- Polyonychus nigropictus (Gory & Laporte, 1839)
- Polyonychus proximus (Kerremans, 1890)
- Polyonychus tricolor (Saunders, 1866)
