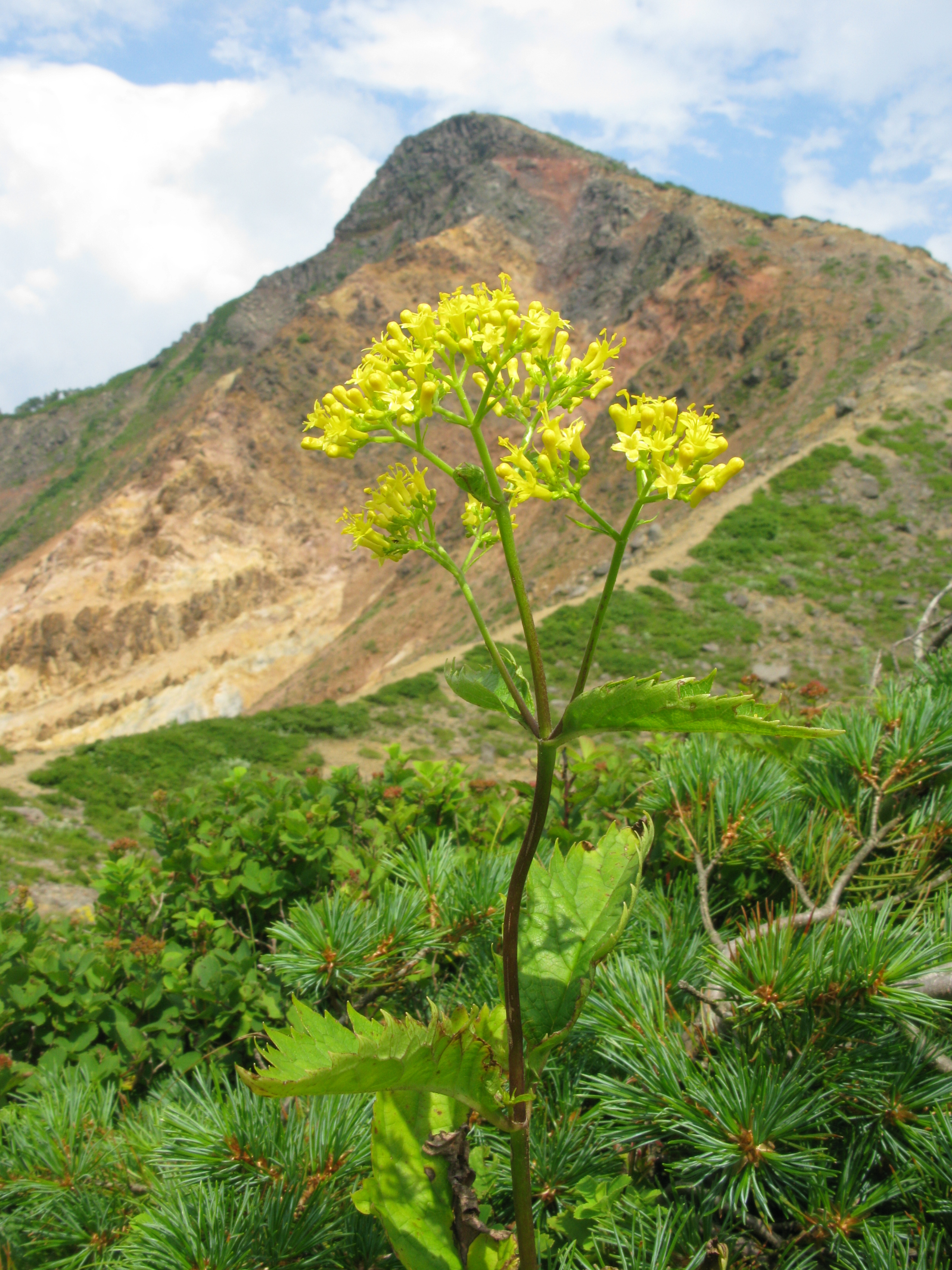
- P. gibbosa with Mt. Bandaisan, Fukushima pref., Japan, in the background

Scientific classification
- Kingdom: Plantae
- Clade: Embryophytes
- Clade: Tracheophytes
- Clade: Spermatophytes
- Clade: Angiosperms
- Clade: Eudicots
- Clade: Asterids
- Order: Dipsacales
- Family: Caprifoliaceae
- Subfamily: Valerianoideae
- Genus: Patrinia; Juss. (1807)

Species
- See text

Synonyms
- Clarkeifedia Kuntze (1903); Fedia Adans. (1763), nom. rej.; Gytonanthus Raf. (1820); Mouffetta Neck. (1790), opus utique oppr.

= Patrinia =

Genus of flowering plants in the honeysuckle family

Patrinia is a genus of herbaceous plants in the honeysuckle family (Caprifoliaceae). It includes 14 species native to grassy mountain habitats from eastern European Russia to China, Siberia, Korea, and Japan. These are unassuming clump-forming perennial plants having thin, erect stems with few leaves and bearing a terminal inflorescence with yellow or white flowers.

== Species ==
14 species are accepted.

- Patrinia gibbosa Maxim.
- Patrinia glabrifolia Yamam. & Sasaki
- Patrinia heterophylla Bunge
- Patrinia × hybrida Makino
- Patrinia intermedia (Hornem.) Roem. & Schult.
- Patrinia monandra C.B.Clarke
- Patrinia rupestris (Pall.) Dufr.
- Patrinia saniculifolia Hemsl.
- Patrinia scabiosifolia Link
- Patrinia scabra Bunge
- Patrinia sibirica (L.) Juss.
- Patrinia speciosa Hand.-Mazz.
- Patrinia trifoliata L.Jin & R.N.Zhao
- Patrinia triloba (Miq.) Miq.
- Patrinia villosa (Thunb.) Dufr.

== Fossil record ==
One fossil fruit of †Patrinia palaeosibirica has been extracted from borehole samples of the Middle Miocene fresh water deposits in Nowy Sacz Basin, West Carpathians, Poland.
