= Bucladesine =

Chemical compound

Clinical data
- Other names: Dibutyryl cyclic adenosine monophosphate (N6,2'-O-dibutyryl)-adenosine-3',5'-mono-phosphate; Dibutyryl cAMP; DcAMP; DBcAMP
- AHFS/Drugs.com: International Drug Names
- ATC code: C01CE04 (WHO)

Identifiers
- IUPAC name: boring(3aR,4R,6R,6aR)-4-(6-butanamido-9H-purin-9-yl)-6-[(butanoyloxy)methyl]-2-oxo-tetrahydro-2H-1,3,5,2λ^{5}-furo[3,4-d][1,3,2]dioxaphosphol-2-olate
- CAS Number: 362-74-3
- PubChem CID: 9687
- IUPHAR/BPS: 5485
- ChemSpider: 9306
- UNII: 63X7MBT2LQ
- ChEBI: CHEBI:50095
- ChEMBL: ChEMBL485980
- CompTox Dashboard (EPA): DTXSID1040459
- ECHA InfoCard: 100.006.046

Chemical and physical data
- Formula: C_{18}H_{23}N_{5}NaO_{8}P
- Molar mass: 491.373 g·mol^{−1}
- 3D model (JSmol): Interactive image
- SMILES: O=C(Nc4ncnc1c4ncn1[C@@H]2O[C@@H]3COP(=O)(O[C@H]3[C@H]2OC(=O)CCC)O)CCC
- InChI: InChI=1S/C18H24N5O8P/c1-3-5-11(24)22-16-13-17(20-8-19-16)23(9-21-13)18-15(30-12(25)6-4-2)14-10(29-18)7-28-32(26,27)31-14/h8-10,14-15,18H,3-7H2,1-2H3,(H,26,27)(H,19,20,22,24)/t10-,14-,15-,18-/m1/s1; Key:CJGYSWNGNKCJSB-YVLZZHOMSA-N

Bucladesine is a cyclic nucleotide derivative which mimics the action of endogenous cAMP and is a phosphodiesterase inhibitor.

Bucladesine is a cell permeable cAMP analog. The compound is used in a wide variety of research applications because it mimics cAMP and can induce normal physiological responses when added to cells in experimental conditions. cAMP is only able to elicit minimal responses in these situations.

The neurite outgrowth instigated by bucladesine in cell cultures has been shown to be enhanced by nardosinone.

== Bucladesine and seizure ==
The effect of bucladesine as a cAMP analog has been studied on the pentylenetetrazol-induced seizure in the wild-type mice. The data showed that bucladesine (300nM/mouse) reduced the seizure latency and threshold. In addition they found that combination of bucladesine and pentoxyfillin has additive effect on seizure latency and threshold.

== Bucladesine and morphine withdrawal syndrome ==
Bucladesine (50-100nM/mouse) showed significant attenuation in the morphine withdrawal syndrome in the wild-type mice. In addition, its high dose (200nM/mouse) combination with H-89, as a protein kinase inhibitor, had additive attenuating effect on withdrawal syndromes.
