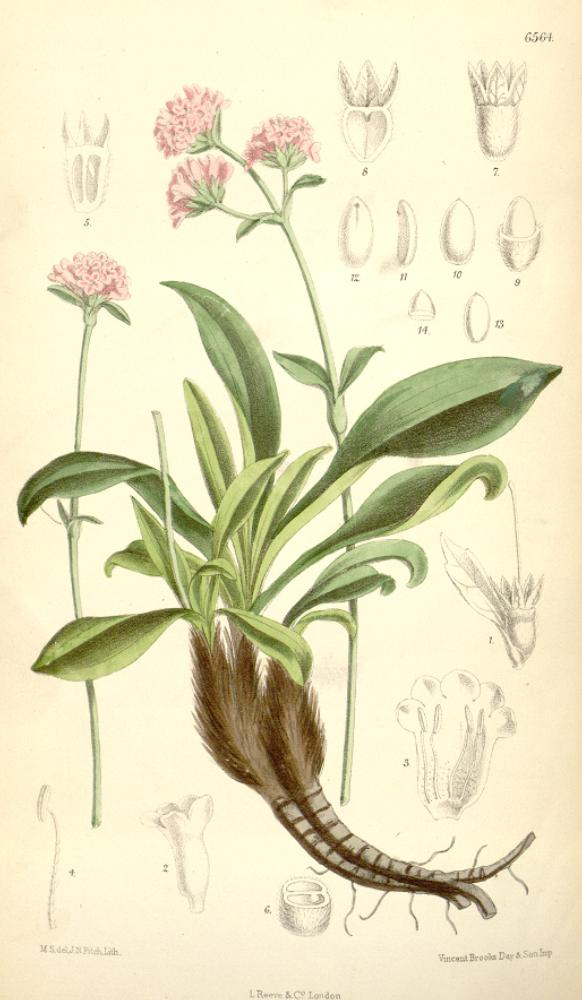

Conservation status
- Critically Endangered (IUCN 3.1)
- CITES Appendix II

Scientific classification
- Kingdom: Plantae
- Clade: Tracheophytes
- Clade: Angiosperms
- Clade: Eudicots
- Clade: Asterids
- Order: Dipsacales
- Family: Caprifoliaceae
- Subfamily: Valerianoideae
- Genus: Nardostachys; DC. (1830)
- Species: N. jatamansi

Binomial name
- Nardostachys jatamansi (D.Don) DC. (1830)

Synonyms
- Fedia grandiflora Wall. (1829), nom. nud.; Fedia jatamansi Wall. ex DC. (1830), not validly publ.; Nardostachys chinensis Batalin (1894); Nardostachys gracilis Kitam. (1954); Nardostachys grandiflora DC. (1830); Nardostachys jatamansi C.B.Clarke (1881), nom. illeg.; Patrinia jatamansi D.Don (1825); Valeriana jatamansi D.Don (1821), nom. illeg.; Valeriana jatamansi (D.Don) Wall. (1829), nom. illeg.

= Nardostachys =

Genus of flowering plants

Nardostachys is a genus of flowering plant in the honeysuckle family (Caprifoliaceae). Nardostachys jatamansi is the sole species in the genus.

It is a perennial that grows in the Himalayas, primarily in a belt through Kumaon, Nepal, Sikkim and Bhutan at elevations of 3,000–5,000 m (9,800–16,400 ft), and in northern Myanmar and western and central China.

It is a source of a type of intensely aromatic amber-colored essential oil, spikenard. The oil has, since ancient times, been used as a perfume, as traditional medicine, and in religious ceremonies. It is also called spikenard, nard, nardin, or muskroot. It is considered endangered due to overharvesting for folk medicine, overgrazing, loss of habitat, and forest degradation.

== Description ==
The plant grows 10–50 cm (4–20 in) in height and has pink, bell-shaped flowers. Rhizome (underground stems) can be crushed and distilled into an intensely aromatic amber-colored essential oil, which is very thick in consistency. Nard oil is used as a perfume, an incense, a sedative, and a herbal medicine said to fight insomnia, birth difficulties, and other minor ailments. Inhalations with added oil help relieve symptoms of colds, coughs and nasal congestion.

== Phytochemistry ==
Preliminary research on the chemical components of Nardostachys jatamansi indicates the plant contains:

- acaciin
- ursolic acid
- octacosanol
- kanshone A
- nardosinonediol
- nardosinone
- aristolen-9beta-ol
- oleanolic acid
- beta-sitosterol

== In spikenard ==
Nardostachys jatamansi may have been used as an ingredient in the incense known as spikenard, although lavender has also been suggested as a candidate for the spikenard of classical times.
