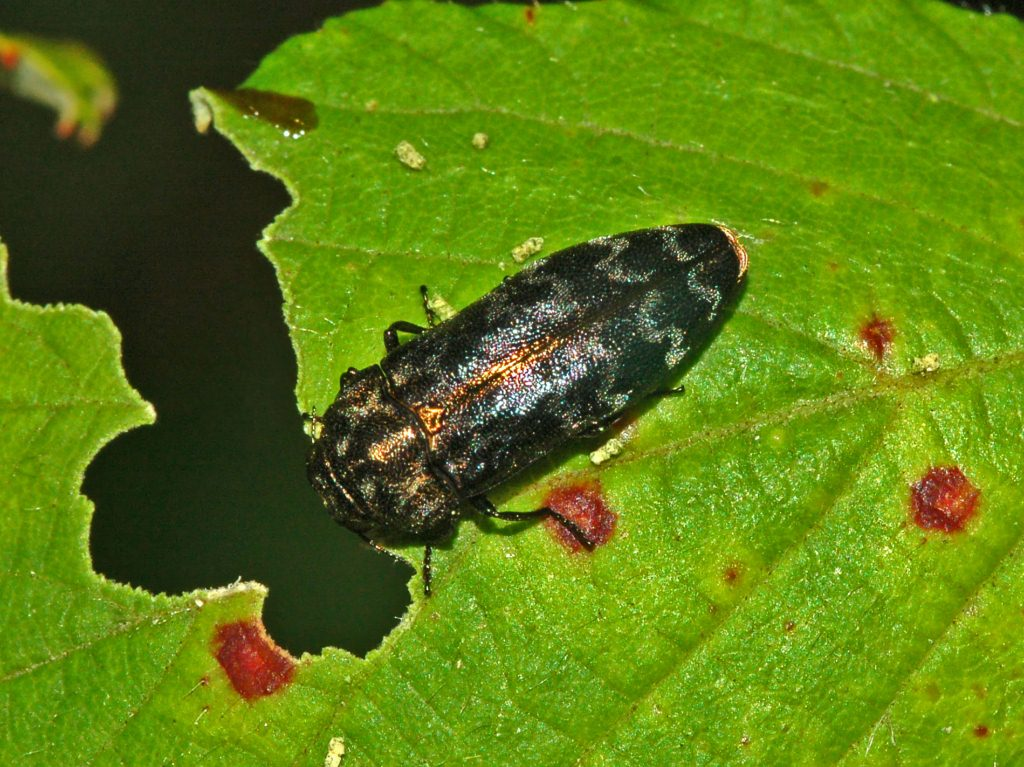

Scientific classification
- Kingdom: Animalia
- Phylum: Arthropoda
- Class: Insecta
- Order: Coleoptera
- Suborder: Polyphaga
- Infraorder: Elateriformia
- Family: Buprestidae
- Genus: Coraebus
- Species: C. rubi

Binomial name
- Coraebus rubi (Linnaeus, 1767)

Synonyms
- Buprestis rubi (Linnaeus, 1767); Mordella nebulosus (Scopoli, 1772)

= Coraebus rubi =

Species of beetle

Coraebus rubi is a species of jewel beetles belonging to the family Buprestidae, subfamily Agrilinae.

== Description ==
C. rubi measures 7.5–11 mm in length. It has blueish elytra with five jagged transverse bands of white hair (the front two of which are variably merged). The head and pronotum have a bronze tinge and the scutellum is black and rugose.

== Distribution and habitat ==
This beetle is present in all the central and southern European countries but absent from North-Western France, The Netherlands, and the Scandinavian counties. A 2018 sighting of the beetle in North Lincolnshire was the first confirmed sighting of this species in the UK; it was probably imported with raspberry plant stock. It is also found in India and maybe present in North Africa. It had previously been trialled as a biological control agent for Rubus fruticosus aggregate in New Zealand though was abandoned for its lack of host specificity.

== Diet and Lifecycle ==
The lifecycle of C. rubi may last up to two years. Adult beetles feed on the leaves of plants in the genera Rubus, Rosa, and Fragaria, whilst the larvae are cane-borers.
