= Nanakusa-no-sekku =

Japanese custom of eating seven-herb rice porridge

Nanakusa-no-sekku 七草の節句
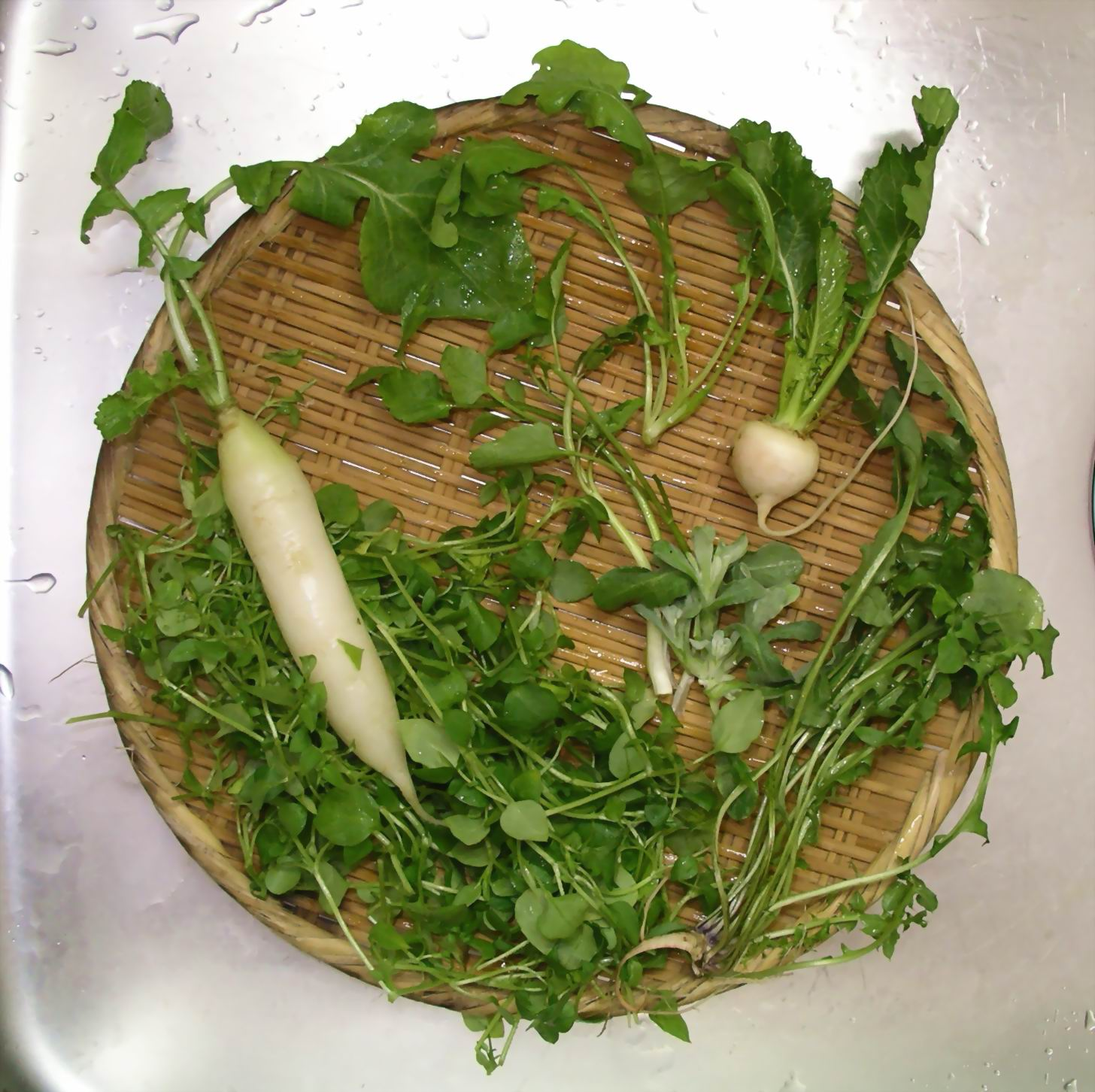
- Nanakusa being prepared
- Genre: Custom
- Date: January 7
- Frequency: Annually
- Country: Japan
- Major events: Eating seven-herb rice porridge

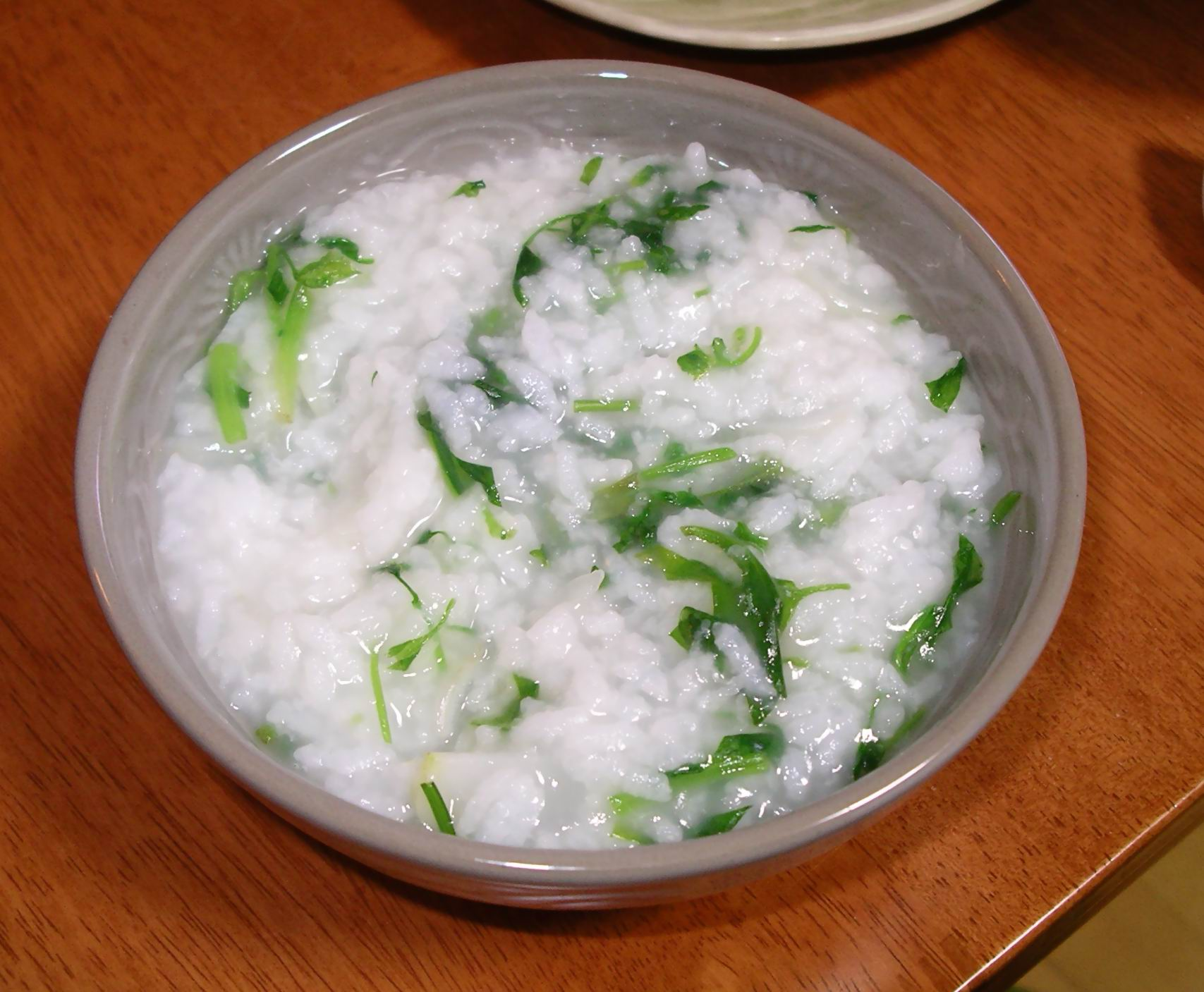
Nanakusa-gayu

The Festival of Seven Herbs or Nanakusa no sekku (Japanese: 七草の節句) is the long-standing Japanese custom of eating seven-herb rice porridge (七草粥, nanakusa-gayu, lit. "7 Herbs Rice-Congee") on January 7 (人日, Jinjitsu); one of the Gosekku.

== History ==
The seventh of the first month has been an important Japanese festival since ancient times. Jingchu Suishiji, written in the Six Dynasties China, recorded the Southern Chinese custom of eating a hot soup that contains seven vegetables to bring longevity and health and ward off evil on the 7th day of the first month of the Chinese calendar. Since there is little green at that time of the year, the young green herbs bring color to the table and eating them suits the spirit of the New Year. The custom was present in Taiwan until the mid-Qing Dynasty, and is still present in parts of rural Guangdong province.

== Seven spring flowers ==
The nanakusa (七草/七種), or more specifically, haru no nanakusa (春の七草/春の七種), spring's seven flowers (or herbs), are seven edible wild herbs of spring. Traditionally, they are:

| Image | Traditional name | Modern name | English |
|---|---|---|---|
| | 芹 (せり seri) | セリ seri | Japanese parsley |
| | 薺 (なずな nazuna) | ナズナ nazuna ぺんぺん草 penpengusa | Shepherd's purse |
| | 御形 (ごぎょう gogyō) | ハハコグサ (母子草) hahakogusa | Cudweed |
| | 繁縷 (はこべら hakobera) | コハコベ (小蘩蔞) kohakobe | Chickweed |
| | 仏の座 (ほとけのざ hotokenoza) | コオニタビラコ (小鬼田平子) koonitabirako | Nipplewort |
| | 菘 (すずな suzuna) | カブ (蕪) kabu | Turnip |
| | 蘿蔔 (すずしろ suzushiro) | ダイコン (大根) daikon | Radish |

There is considerable variation in the precise ingredients, with common local herbs often being substituted.

On the morning of January 7, or the night before, people place the nanakusa, rice scoop, and/or wooden pestle on the cutting board and, facing the good-luck direction, chant "Before the birds of the continent (China) fly to Japan, let's get nanakusa" while cutting the herbs into pieces. The chant may vary from place to place.

=== Musical accompaniment ===
| Standard | Hiragana | Romaji | Translation |
|---|---|---|---|
| 唐土の鳥と、 日本の鳥と、 渡らぬ先に、 七種なずな、 手につみ入れて、 亢觜斗張となる | とうどのとりと、 にほんのとりと、 わたらぬさきに、 ななくさなずな、 てにつみいれて、 こうしとちょうとなる | tōdo no tori to, nihon no tori to, wataranu saki ni, nanakusa nazuna, te ni tsumi-ire te, kōshitochō to naru | China-land's birds and Japanese birds, earlier than bring on their coming, seven species wild herb, I pluck them to the hand and it becomes Neck, Turtle Beak, Dipper and Extended Net. |

== Seven autumn flowers ==
The spring-time nanakusa are mirrored by aki no nanakusa (秋の七草/秋の七種), meaning autumn's seven flowers. They are listed below:

| Image | Traditional name | Modern name | English |
|---|---|---|---|
| | 女郎花 (おみなえし ominaeshi) | オミナエシ ominaeshi | Patrinia scabiosifolia |
| | 尾花 (おばな obana) | ススキ susuki | Miscanthus sinensis |
| | 桔梗 (ききょう kikyou) | キキョウ kikyou | Platycodon grandiflorus |
| | 撫子 (なでしこ nadeshiko) | カワラナデシコ kawaranadeshiko | Dianthus superbus |
| | 藤袴 (ふじばかま fujibakama) | フジバカマ fujibakama | Eupatorium fortunei |
| | 葛 (くず kuzu) | クズ kuzu | Pueraria lobata |
| | 萩 (はぎ hagi) | ハギ hagi | Lespedeza |

The seven flowers of autumn are bush clover (hagi), miscanthus (obana, Miscanthus sinensis), kudzu, large pink (nadeshiko, Dianthus superbus), yellow-flowered valerian (ominaeshi, Patrinia scabiosifolia), boneset (fujibakama, Eupatorium fortunei), and Chinese bellflower (kikyō, Platycodon gradiflorus). These seven autumn flowers provide visual enjoyment. Their simplicity was very much admired: they are small and dainty yet beautifully colored. They are named as typical autumn flowers in a verse from the Man'yōshū anthology.

Unlike their spring counterparts, there is no particular event to do anything about the seven flowers of autumn. The autumn flowers are not intended for picking or eating, but for appreciation, despite each one is believed to have medical efficacy in traditional Chinese medicine. Tanka and haiku theming hanano (花野, lit. flower field), meaning fields where the autumn wildflowers are in full bloom, have a centuries-old history.

== Cautionary note ==
The Japanese parsley (Oenanthe javanica) species of the Oenanthe (water dropworts) genus is closely related to and easily confused with toxic water hemlock. Although accidental poisoning is rare, caution should be exercised when dealing with oenanthe species. As Oenanthe javanica is not found outside of Asia unless specifically cultivated, wild-growing varieties of water dropworts should be considered lethal, even in small amounts.
