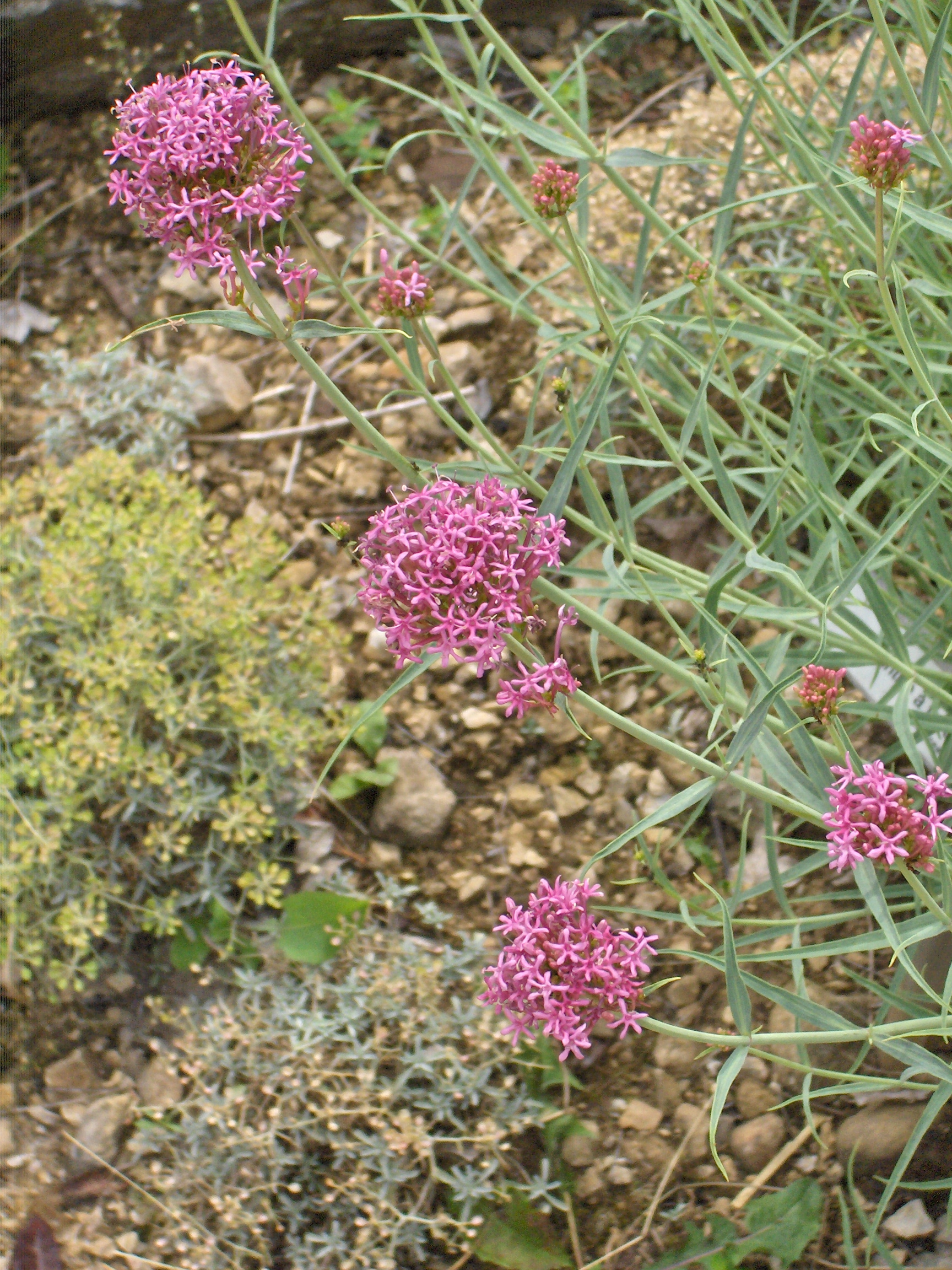
- Flowers of the narrow-leaved valerian (Centranthus angustifolius)

Scientific classification
- Kingdom: Plantae
- Clade: Tracheophytes
- Clade: Angiosperms
- Clade: Eudicots
- Clade: Asterids
- Order: Dipsacales
- Family: Caprifoliaceae
- Subfamily: Valerianoideae; Raf. (1820)

Genera
- see text

= Valerianoideae =

Subfamily of flowering plants

Valerianoideae is a subfamily of plants.

== Genera ==
- Centranthus - 12 species
- Fedia
- Nardostachys - 1 species
- Patrinia - 14 species
- Plectritis (Seablushes) - 5 species
- Valeriana (Valerians) - 426 species
- Valerianella (Cornsalads) - 28 species
