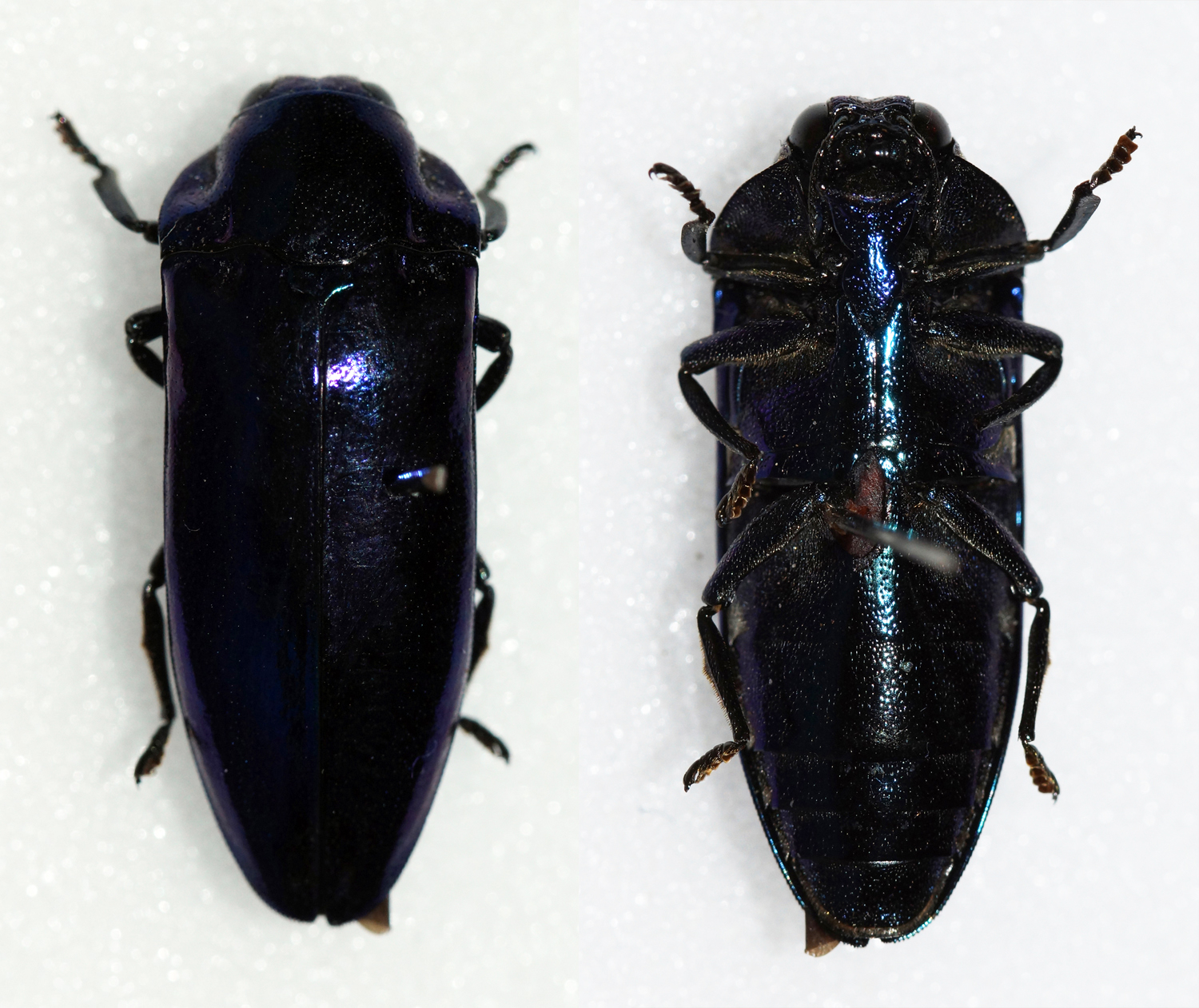
- Coraebosoma violaceum

Scientific classification
- Kingdom: Animalia
- Phylum: Arthropoda
- Class: Insecta
- Order: Coleoptera
- Suborder: Polyphaga
- Infraorder: Elateriformia
- Family: Buprestidae
- Genus: Coraebosoma; Obenberger, 1923

= Coraebosoma =

Genus of beetles

Coraebosoma is a genus of beetles in the family Buprestidae, containing the following species:

- Coraebosoma carteri Hoscheck, 1931
- Coraebosoma indicum Bellamy, 1990
- Coraebosoma manilense Obenberger, 1923
- Coraebosoma mindoroense Ohmomo, 2002
- Coraebosoma negrosianum Bellamy, 1990
- Coraebosoma panayense Bellamy, 1990
- Coraebosoma samarense Bellamy, 1990
- Coraebosoma sibuyanicum Bellamy, 1990
- Coraebosoma violaceum Bellamy, 1990
- Coraebosoma viridis Bellamy & Ohmomo, 2009
