= Belgaumia =

Scientific classification
- Kingdom: Animalia
- Phylum: Arthropoda
- Class: Insecta
- Order: Coleoptera
- Suborder: Polyphaga
- Infraorder: Elateriformia
- Family: Buprestidae
- Genus: Belgaumia; Kerremans, 1903

Genus of beetles

Belgaumia is a genus of beetles in the family Buprestidae, containing the following species:

- Belgaumia capucinea (Kerremans, 1893)
- Belgaumia horni Thery, 1941
- Belgaumia sarrauti (Bourgoin, 1922)
