= Philocoroebus =

Scientific classification
- Kingdom: Animalia
- Phylum: Arthropoda
- Class: Insecta
- Order: Coleoptera
- Suborder: Polyphaga
- Infraorder: Elateriformia
- Family: Buprestidae
- Genus: Philocoroebus; Bellamy, 1991

Genus of beetles

Philocoroebus is a genus of beetles in the family Buprestidae, the jewel beetles. They are native to the Philippines.

Species include:

- Philocoroebus adamantinus Bellamy, 1991
- Philocoroebus alius Bellamy, 1991
- Philocoroebus azureipennis (Obenberger, 1934)
- Philocoroebus banahaoensis (Obenberger, 1928)
- Philocoroebus cynaeoviridis (Fisher, 1922)
- Philocoroebus elongatus Bellamy, 1991
- Philocoroebus maquilingensis Bellamy, 1991
- Philocoroebus meliboeiformis (Saunders, 1874)
- Philocoroebus pseudocisseis Bellamy, 1991
- Philocoroebus purpureus Bellamy, 1991
- Philocoroebus samarensis Bellamy, 1991
