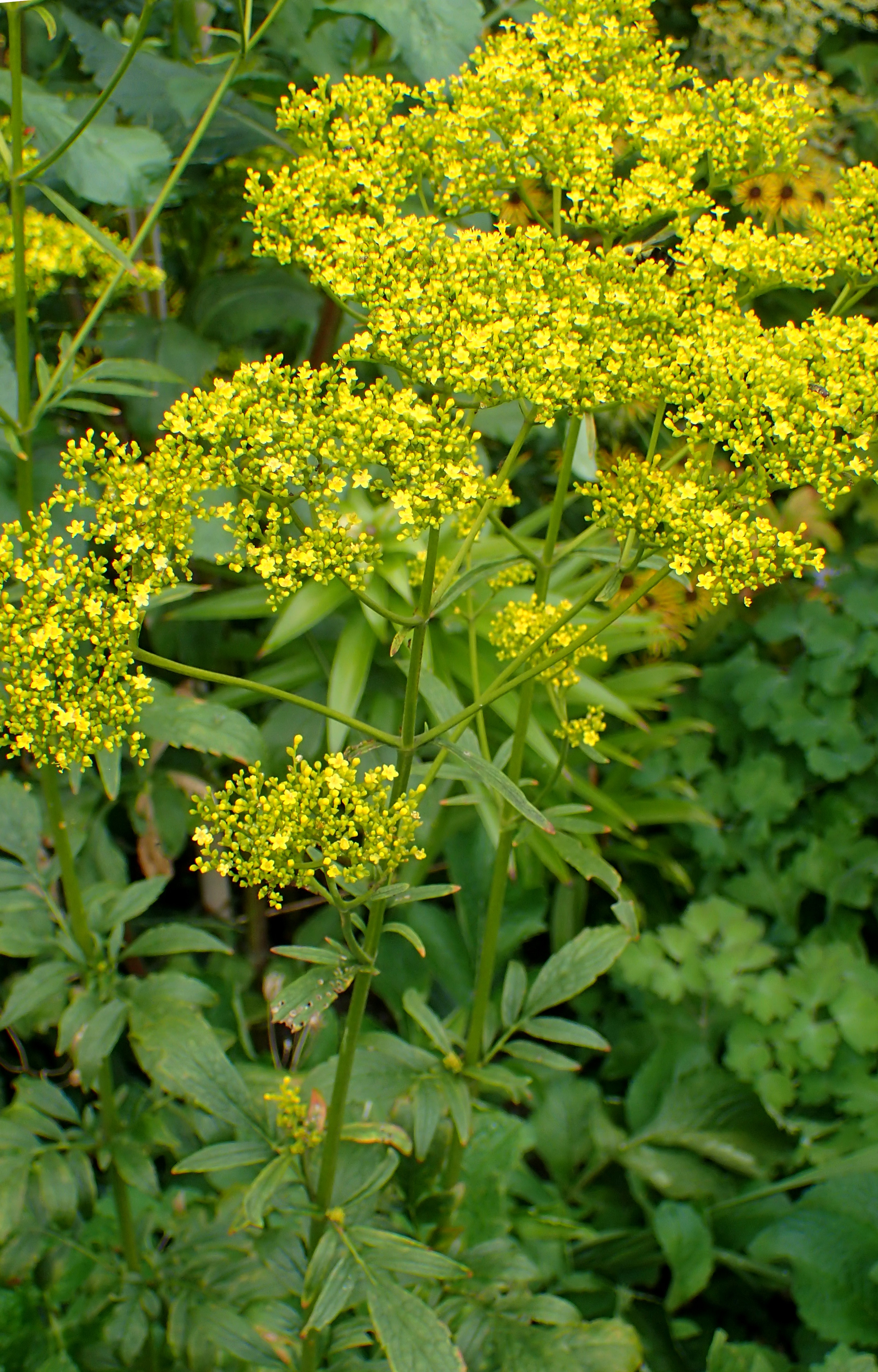
- At the New York Botanical Garden
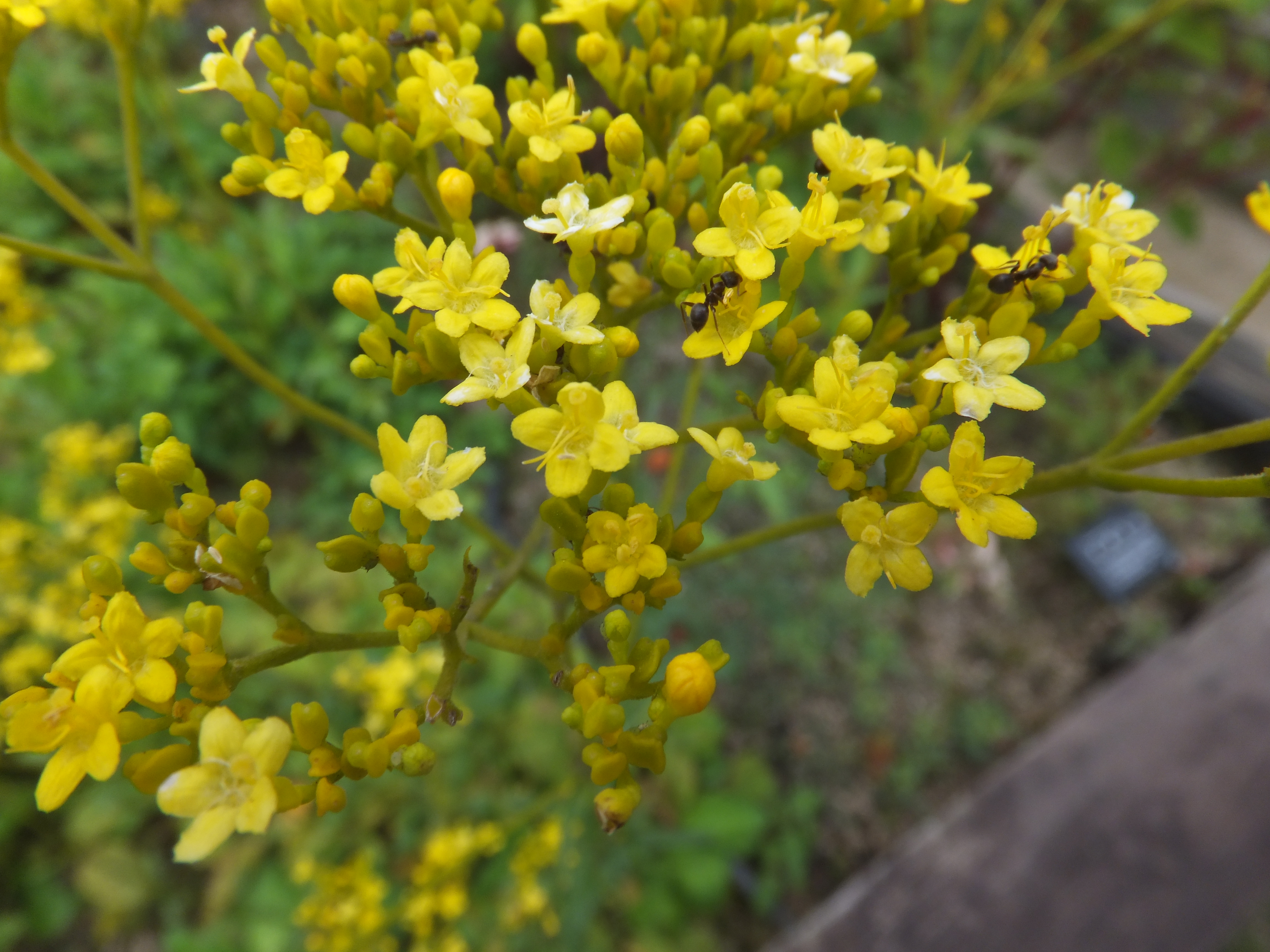
- Close-up of flowers at Kōko-en

Scientific classification
- Kingdom: Plantae
- Clade: Embryophytes
- Clade: Tracheophytes
- Clade: Spermatophytes
- Clade: Angiosperms
- Clade: Eudicots
- Clade: Asterids
- Order: Dipsacales
- Family: Caprifoliaceae
- Genus: Patrinia
- Species: P. scabiosifolia

Binomial name
- Patrinia scabiosifolia Link

Synonyms
- List: Fedia scabiosifolia Trevir.; Fedia serratulifolia Trevir.; Patrinia diandra Kitag.; Patrinia hispida Bunge; Patrinia japonica (Miq.) Miq.; Patrinia parviflora Siebold & Zucc.; Patrinia scabiosifolia Fisch. ex Trevir.; Patrinia scabiosifolia var. crassa Masam. & Satomi; Patrinia scabiosifolia var. hispida (Bunge) Franch.; Patrinia serratulifolia (Trevir.) Fisch. ex Rchb.; Valeriana japonica Miq.

= Patrinia scabiosifolia =

Species of flowering plant

Patrinia scabiosifolia, the eastern valerian or golden lace, is a species of flowering plant in the family Caprifoliaceae. It is native to southeastern Siberia, Mongolia, the Russian Far East, most of China, Vietnam, Korea, Japan, and the Ryukyu Islands, and it has been introduced to Irkutsk. In Japan it is one of the popular Seven Flowers of Autumn. A spreading perennial, it is readily available in commerce.

== Subtaxa ==
The following forms are accepted:

- Patrinia scabiosifolia f. crassa (Masam. & Satomi) Kitam. ex T.Yamaz. – central Honshu
- Patrinia scabiosifolia f. scabiosifolia – entire range
