= Eupristocerus =

Eupristocerus cogitans

Scientific classification
- Kingdom: Animalia
- Phylum: Arthropoda
- Class: Insecta
- Order: Coleoptera
- Suborder: Polyphaga
- Infraorder: Elateriformia
- Family: Buprestidae
- Genus: Eupristocerus; Deyrolle, 1864
- Species: E. cogitans

Binomial name
- Eupristocerus cogitans (Weber, 1801)

Genus of beetles

Eupristocerus cogitans is a species of beetles in the family Buprestidae, the only species in the genus Eupristocerus.
