= Cisseicoraebus =

Scientific classification
- Kingdom: Animalia
- Phylum: Arthropoda
- Class: Insecta
- Order: Coleoptera
- Suborder: Polyphaga
- Infraorder: Elateriformia
- Family: Buprestidae
- Genus: Cisseicoraebus; Kerremans, 1903

Genus of beetles

Cisseicoraebus is a genus of beetles in the family Buprestidae, containing the following species:

- Cisseicoraebus bicoloratus Bellamy, 1991
- Cisseicoraebus boudanti Bellamy, 1998
- Cisseicoraebus cisseoides (Saunders, 1974)
- Cisseicoraebus grandis (Kerremans, 1900)
- Cisseicoraebus nigroviolaceus (Deyrolle, 1864)
- Cisseicoraebus opaculus Obenberger, 1932
- Cisseicoraebus piperi (Fisher, 1921)
- Cisseicoraebus pullatus (Saunders, 1874)
- Cisseicoraebus retrolatus (Deyrolle, 1864)
- Cisseicoraebus subgrandis Bellamy, 1998
- Cisseicoraebus violaceus Bellamy, 1998
