= Brachycoraebus =

Scientific classification
- Kingdom: Animalia
- Phylum: Arthropoda
- Class: Insecta
- Order: Coleoptera
- Suborder: Polyphaga
- Infraorder: Elateriformia
- Family: Buprestidae
- Genus: Brachycoraebus; Kerremans, 1903

Genus of beetles

Brachycoraebus is a genus of beetles in the family Buprestidae, containing the following species:

- Brachycoraebus aeneus Cheong, 2016
- Brachycoraebus aruensis Kuban, 1996
- Brachycoraebus basilanensis Bellamy, 2005
- Brachycoraebus baumi (Obenberger, 1929)
- Brachycoraebus borneensis (Kerremans, 1912)
- Brachycoraebus brodskyi Kuban, 1995
- Brachycoraebus buyteti (Baudon, 1961)
- Brachycoraebus cumatilis (Bourgoin, 1922)
- Brachycoraebus disponsae (Baudon, 1968)
- Brachycoraebus helferi Obenberger, 1922
- Brachycoraebus helferiana Cobos, 1957
- Brachycoraebus herychi Obenberger, 1940
- Brachycoraebus horakianus Kuban, 1995
- Brachycoraebus klapperichi Obenberger, 1959
- Brachycoraebus krali Kuban, 1996
- Brachycoraebus longicornis Kuban, 1997
- Brachycoraebus luzonicus Obenberger, 1959
- Brachycoraebus mindanaoensis Bellamy, 2005
- Brachycoraebus minutus Bellamy, 2005
- Brachycoraebus navratili Kuban, 1995
- Brachycoraebus piliferus (Deyrolle, 1864)
- Brachycoraebus punctatus (Baudon, 1968)
- Brachycoraebus rondoni (Baudon, 1968)
- Brachycoraebus svatopluki Kuban, 1995
- Brachycoraebus vicinus (Kerremans, 1900)
- Brachycoraebus viridus (Kerremans, 1900)
