= Nardosinone =

Names
- Preferred IUPAC name (3aR,9R,9aR,9bS)-1,1,9,9a-Tetramethyl-1,3a,4,7,8,9,9a,9b-octahydro-5H-naphtho[2,1-c][1,2]dioxol-5-one

Identifiers
CAS Number	23720-80-1
3D model (JSmol)	Interactive image
ChemSpider	147074
PubChem CID	168136
UNII	5VA93HYL8U
CompTox Dashboard (EPA)	DTXSID50946520
- InChI: InChI=1S/C15H22O3/c1-9-6-5-7-10-11(16)8-12-13(15(9,10)4)14(2,3)18-17-12/h7,9,12-13H,5-6,8H2,1-4H3/t9-,12-,13+,15+/m1/s1 Key: KXGHHSIMRWPVQM-JWFUOXDNSA-N; InChI=1/C15H22O3/c1-9-6-5-7-10-11(16)8-12-13(15(9,10)4)14(2,3)18-17-12/h7,9,12-13H,5-6,8H2,1-4H3/t9-,12-,13+,15+/m1/s1 Key: KXGHHSIMRWPVQM-JWFUOXDNBH
- SMILES: O=C2/C1=C/CC[C@@H](C)[C@@]1([C@@H]3C(OO[C@@H]3C2)(C)C)C

Properties
Chemical formula	C_{15}H_{22}O_{3}
Molar mass	250.338 g·mol^{−1}
- Except where otherwise noted, data are given for materials in their standard state (at 25 °C [77 °F], 100 kPa). Infobox references

Nardosinone is a sesquiterpene and chemical constituent of Nardostachys jatamansi. In in vitro studies, the compound has demonstrated concentration-dependent enhancement of bucladesine and staurosporine-induced neurite outgrowth. Nardosinone has similarly been demonstrated to enhance NGF-mediated neurite outgrowth and synaptogenesis from PC12D cells.

Additionally, nardosinone has demonstrated cytotoxic activity against cultured P-388 lymphocytic leukemia cells.
