= Sterpuric acid =

Phytotoxic metabolite

Names
- Preferred IUPAC name (2aS,3aR,5S,7aR)-7a-Hydroxy-2a,5,7-trimethyl-2,2a,3,3a,4,5,6,7a-octahydro-1H-cyclobuta[f]indene-5-carboxylic acid

Identifiers
CAS Number	79367-59-2
3D model (JSmol)	Interactive image
ChEMBL	ChEMBL2071322
ChemSpider	22899163
PubChem CID	14108443
CompTox Dashboard (EPA)	DTXSID701045357
- InChI: InChI=1S/C15H22O3/c1-9-11-8-13(2,12(16)17)6-10(11)7-14(3)4-5-15(9,14)18/h10,18H,4-8H2,1-3H3,(H,16,17)/t10-,13-,14-,15-/m0/s1 Key: PQUVTIVCCBHWFH-HJPIBITLSA-N
- SMILES: OC12C(=C3CC(CC3CC1(CC2)C)(C(=O)O)C)C

Properties
Chemical formula	C_{15}H_{22}O_{3}
Molar mass	250.338 g·mol^{−1}
- Except where otherwise noted, data are given for materials in their standard state (at 25 °C [77 °F], 100 kPa). Infobox references

Sterpuric acid is a phytotoxic metabolite derived from the fungus Stereum purpureum, from which it derives its name. This fungus causes silver-leaf disease of fruit trees.

Sterpuric acid disrupts plant cell membranes, leading to necrosis and the characteristic silvering of leaves. The fungus also produces other phytotoxic compounds, such as sterpurene, which contribute to its pathogenicity.
