= Mundaria =

Scientific classification
- Kingdom: Animalia
- Phylum: Arthropoda
- Class: Insecta
- Order: Coleoptera
- Suborder: Polyphaga
- Infraorder: Elateriformia
- Family: Buprestidae
- Genus: Mundaria; Kerremans, 1894

Genus of beetles

Mundaria is a genus of beetles in the family Buprestidae, containing the following species:

- Mundaria analis (Saunders, 1867)
- Mundaria brooksi (Kerremans, 1912)
- Mundaria dessumi Descarpentries & Villiers, 1966
- Mundaria harmandi (Thery, 1941)
- Mundaria postfasciata Obenberger, 1922
- Mundaria typica Kerremans, 1894
