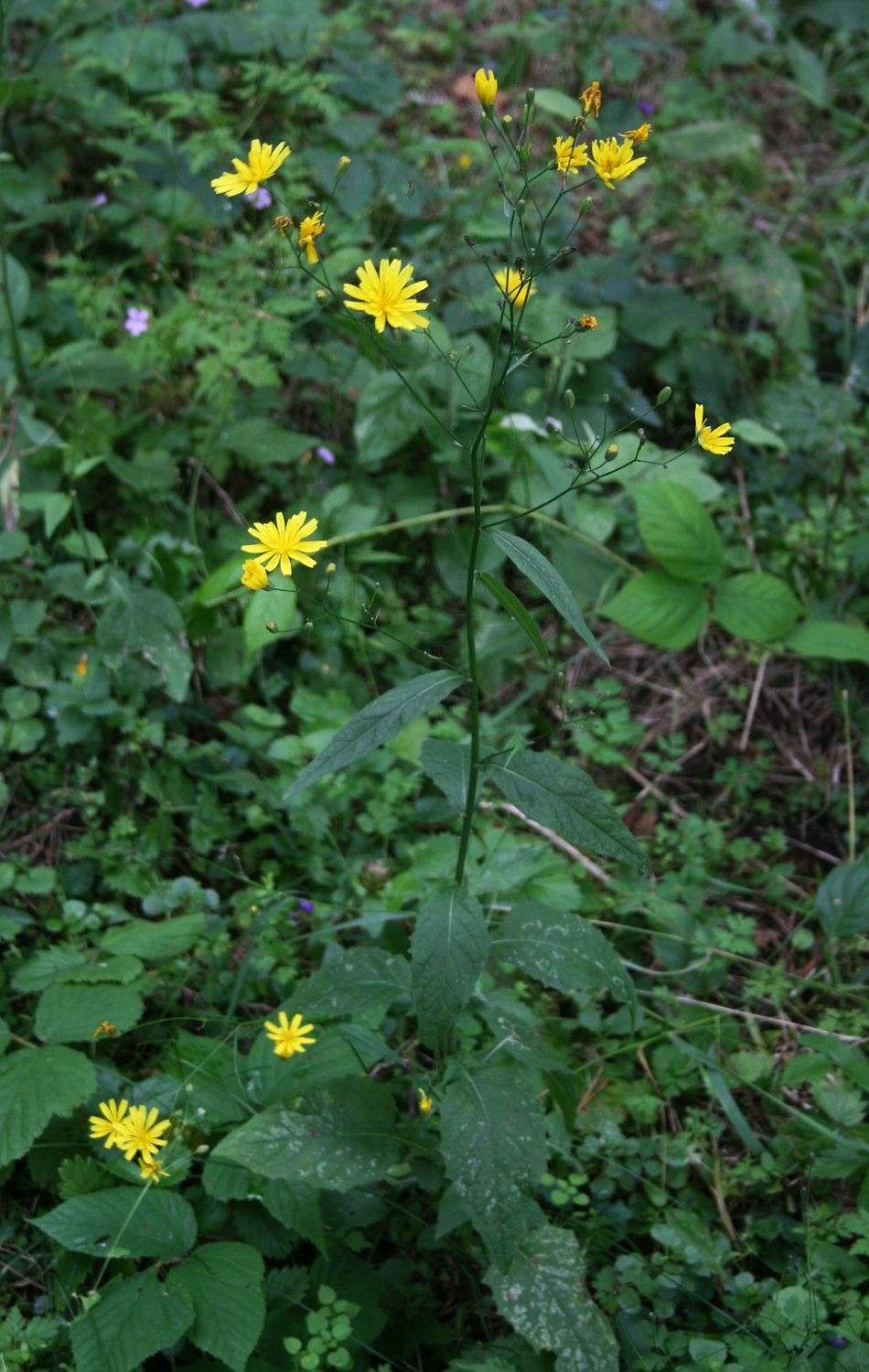
- Lapsana communis

Scientific classification
- Kingdom: Plantae
- Clade: Tracheophytes
- Clade: Angiosperms
- Clade: Eudicots
- Clade: Asterids
- Order: Asterales
- Family: Asteraceae
- Subfamily: Cichorioideae
- Tribe: Cichorieae
- Subtribe: Crepidinae
- Genus: Lapsana; L.

Type species
- Lapsana communis L.

= Lapsana =

Genus of flowering plants

Lapsana is a genus of flowering plants in the family Asteraceae. It is native to Europe and northern Asia. Nipplewort is a common name for plants in this genus.

== Species ==
Plant list

- Lapsana chondrilloides L.
- Lapsana communis L.
- Lapsana crassifolia Vahl ex DC.
- Lapsana lampsanifolia Mill.
- Lapsana taraxacoides Forssk.
- Lapsana taraxaconoides J.F.Gmel.
