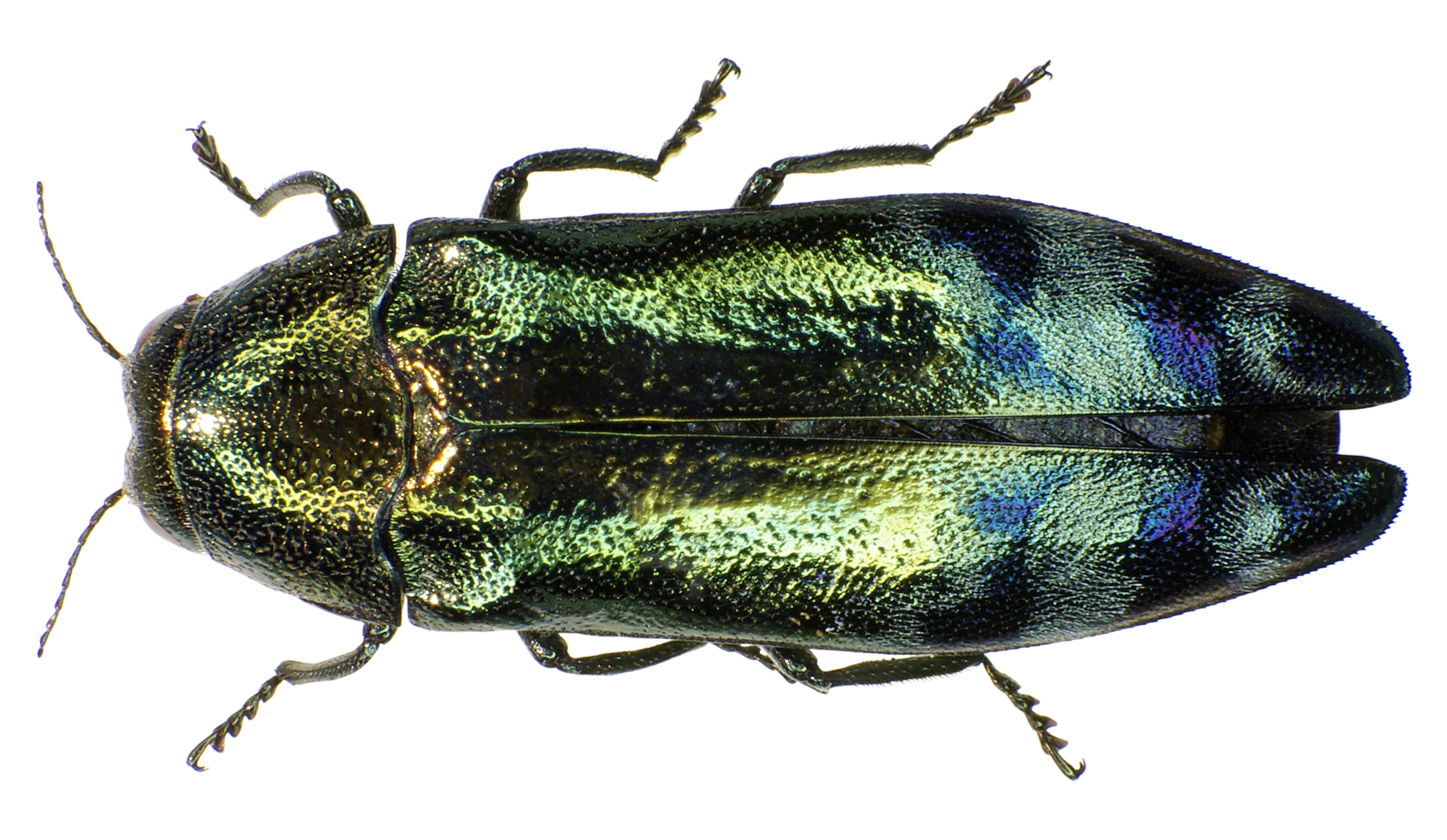
- Coraebus florentinus

Scientific classification
- Domain: Eukaryota
- Kingdom: Animalia
- Phylum: Arthropoda
- Class: Insecta
- Order: Coleoptera
- Suborder: Polyphaga
- Infraorder: Elateriformia
- Family: Buprestidae
- Genus: Coraebus; Gory & Laporte, 1839

= Coraebus =

Genus of beetles

Coraebus is a genus of beetles in the family Buprestidae, containing the following species:

- Coraebus aculeatus Ganglbauer, 1890
- Coraebus acutus Thomson, 1879
- Coraebus aeneopictus (Kerremans, 1895)
- Coraebus aequalipennis Fairmaire, 1888
- Coraebus aesopus Kerremans, 1913
- Coraebus akiyamai Kubán, 1997
- Coraebus albivestitus Bellamy, 1991
- Coraebus aldo Kubán, 1996
- Coraebus amabilis Kerremans, 1895
- Coraebus amamianus Kurosawa, 1985
- Coraebus amplithorax (Fairmaire, 1889)
- Coraebus andreorum Kubán, 1996
- Coraebus andrewesi Obenberger, 1922
- Coraebus annamensis Descarpentries & Villiers, 1967
- Coraebus anniae Obenberger, 1928
- Coraebus auberti Théry, 1923
- Coraebus auriventris Kerremans, 1912
- Coraebus aurofasciatus (Hope, 1831)
- Coraebus baoshanensis Kubán, 1996
- Coraebus battareli Descarpentries & Villiers, 1967
- Coraebus baylei Bourgoin, 1922
- Coraebus becvari Kubán, 1995
- Coraebus bilyi Kubán, 1996
- Coraebus bilyianus Kubán, 1995
- Coraebus binhensis Descarpentries & Villiers, 1967
- Coraebus bivestitus Bellamy, 1991
- Coraebus blandus Akiyama & Ohmomo, 1989
- Coraebus blaoensis Descarpentries & Villiers, 1967
- Coraebus borneensis Kerremans, 1912
- Coraebus bunun Miwa & Chûjô, 1940
- Coraebus cavifrons Descarpentries & Villiers, 1967
- Coraebus cervenkai Kubán, 1995
- Coraebus chapensis Descarpentries & Villiers, 1967
- Coraebus chrysogaster Kurosawa, 1953
- Coraebus chucki Kubán, 1997
- Coraebus cingulatus (Hope, 1831)
- Coraebus circularis Kerremans, 1888
- Coraebus cisseiformis Obenberger, 1913
- Coraebus clermonti Bourgoin, 1924
- Coraebus cloueti Théry, 1895
- Coraebus coelestiofulgens Akiyama & Ohmomo, 1993
- Coraebus coelestis Saunders, 1874
- Coraebus coeruleus Kerremans, 1892
- Coraebus collaris Gory & Laporte, 1839
- Coraebus conjunctus Deyrolle, 1864
- Coraebus conspicuus Thomson, 1878
- Coraebus coomani Descarpentries & Villiers, 1967
- Coraebus cornutus Deyrolle, 1864
- Coraebus corporaali Obenberger, 1932
- Coraebus cupreosplendens Akiyama, 1989
- Coraebus cupricollis Deyrolle, 1864
- Coraebus cyaneopictus Kerremans, 1892
- Coraebus daisenensis Miwa, 1940
- Coraebus davidis Fairmaire, 1886
- Coraebus delepinei Baudon, 1960
- Coraebus delicatus Kerremans, 1895
- Coraebus dembickyi Kubán, 1995
- Coraebus demonstratus Kubán, 1995
- Coraebus denticollis Saunders, 1866
- Coraebus dessumi Descarpentries & Villiers, 1967
- Coraebus diminutus Gebhardt, 1928
- Coraebus disponsae Baudon, 1968
- Coraebus disponsi Baudon, 1962
- Coraebus duodecimpunctatus Obenberger, 1940
- Coraebus elatus (Fabricius, 1787)
- Coraebus elegantissimus Akiyama, 1989
- Coraebus elongaticollis Akiyama & Ohmomo, 1993
- Coraebus elongatus Peng, 1998
- Coraebus embriki Obenberger, 1932
- Coraebus fallaciosus Bourgoin, 1925
- Coraebus fasciatus (Villers, 1789)
- Coraebus femina Kubán, 1997
- Coraebus fokienicus Obenberger, 1940
- Coraebus formosanus Miwa & Chûjô, 1935
- Coraebus francoisi Baudon, 1968
- Coraebus frater Bourgoin, 1925
- Coraebus fukamachii Akiyama, 1987
- Coraebus fulgidus Obenberger, 1916
- Coraebus gagneuxi Baudon, 1963
- Coraebus gestroi Kerremans, 1892
- Coraebus gorkai Gebhardt, 1928
- Coraebus gorkaianus Kubán, 1997
- Coraebus grisator (Gory & Laporte, 1839)
- Coraebus guangxiensis Peng, 1998
- Coraebus hastanus Gory & Laporte, 1839
- Coraebus hauseri Obenberger, 1930
- Coraebus herychi Obenberger, 1940
- Coraebus hewitti Kerremans, 1912
- Coraebus holzschuhi Kubán, 1996
- Coraebus honza Kubán, 1995
- Coraebus horaki Kubán, 1995
- Coraebus hoscheki Gebhardt, 1928
- Coraebus houianus Kubán, 1995
- Coraebus hovorkai Kubán, 1997
- Coraebus ignifrons Fairmaire, 1895
- Coraebus ignotus Saunders, 1873
- Coraebus inornatus Kerremans, 1912
- Coraebus insignis Kerremans, 1898
- Coraebus insulicolus Kerremans, 1912
- Coraebus intemeratus Obenberger, 1940
- Coraebus iriei Kurosawa, 1985
- Coraebus ishiharai Kurosawa, 1953
- Coraebus jeanvoinei Descarpentries & Villiers, 1967
- Coraebus jedlickai Obenberger, 1934
- Coraebus jelineki Descarpentries & Villiers, 1967
- Coraebus jendeki Kubán, 1997
- Coraebus jiangxiensis Peng, 1989
- Coraebus karenorum Kubán, 1995
- Coraebus kerremansi Théry, 1926
- Coraebus kiangsuanus Obenberger, 1934
- Coraebus kiyoshii Akiyama, 1989
- Coraebus klapaleki Obenberger, 1924
- Coraebus klickai Obenberger, 1930
- Coraebus komiyai Akiyama, 1988
- Coraebus kubani Peng, 1998
- Coraebus kulti Obenberger, 1940
- Coraebus kurosawai Akiyama, 1988
- Coraebus laportei Saunders, 1871
- Coraebus larminati Kubán, 1995
- Coraebus lepidulus Obenberger, 1940
- Coraebus lesnei Bourgoin, 1922
- Coraebus leucospilotus Bourgoin, 1922
- Coraebus levasseuri Bourgoin, 1925
- Coraebus lienhwachiensis Akiyama, 1988
- Coraebus linnei Obenberger, 1922
- Coraebus longipennis Deyrolle, 1864
- Coraebus loochooensis Kano, 1929
- Coraebus lubopetri Kubán, 1995
- Coraebus maculifer Abeille de Perrin, 1897
- Coraebus magnus Kerremans, 1898
- Coraebus malabaricus Obenberger, 1922
- Coraebus malayanus Kubán, 1995
- Coraebus meditabundus (Fabricius, 1787)
- Coraebus melancholicus Obenberger, 1932
- Coraebus meliboeoides Bílý, 1983
- Coraebus mianningensis Peng, 1991
- Coraebus mirus Kubán, 1996
- Coraebus modestus Kerremans, 1892
- Coraebus modiglianii Kerremans, 1894
- Coraebus montanus (Fisher, 1935)
- Coraebus moultoni Kerremans, 1912
- Coraebus muehlei Kubán, 1996
- Coraebus muelleri Théry, 1925
- Coraebus natator Kubán, 1996
- Coraebus nigromaculatus Kurosawa, 1953
- Coraebus nikodymi Kubán, 1995
- Coraebus niponicus Lewis, 1894
- Coraebus obscurus Peng, 1991
- Coraebus occidentalis Kubán, 1997
- Coraebus oertzeni Ganglbauer, 1886
- Coraebus olexai Bílý, 1983
- Coraebus orothi (Baudon, 1962)
- Coraebus pacholatkoi Kubán, 1996
- Coraebus pascoei Saunders, 1867
- Coraebus perpulcher Obenberger, 1916
- Coraebus perroti Descarpentries, 1948
- Coraebus perrotianus Descarpentries & Villiers, 1967
- Coraebus petri Kubán, 1996
- Coraebus pickai Kubán, 1995
- Coraebus probstorum Kubán, 1995
- Coraebus pseudoblandus Kubán, 1997
- Coraebus pseudopurpura Kubán, 1997
- Coraebus pulchellus Nonfried, 1895
- Coraebus purkynei Obenberger, 1934
- Coraebus purpura Kubán, 1996
- Coraebus purpuratiformis Kubán, 1995
- Coraebus purpureicollis Gestro, 1877
- Coraebus quadriundulatus Motschulsky, 1866
- Coraebus quangxiensis Peng, 1998
- Coraebus rambouseki Obenberger, 1934
- Coraebus rubi (Linnaeus, 1767)
- Coraebus rugosus Deyrolle, 1864
- Coraebus rusticanus Lewis, 1893
- Coraebus sainvali Kubán, 1997
- Coraebus sakagutii Kurosawa, 1963
- Coraebus salamandra Kubán, 1995
- Coraebus salamandriformis Kubán, 1995
- Coraebus salvazai Bourgoin, 1922
- Coraebus sausai Kubán, 1997
- Coraebus sauteri Kerremans, 1912
- Coraebus semipurpureus Fairmaire, 1889
- Coraebus semiviolaceus Deyrolle, 1864
- Coraebus sericeus Kerremans, 1894
- Coraebus sherpa Kubán, 1996
- Coraebus sidae Kerremans, 1888
- Coraebus simplex Peng, 1991
- Coraebus sinomeridionalis Kubán, 1995
- Coraebus smaragdineus Kerremans, 1892
- Coraebus sonani Miwa & Chûjô, 1935
- Coraebus spathatus (Kerremans, 1892)
- Coraebus spectabiliformis Kubán, 1995
- Coraebus spectabilis Bílý, 1983
- Coraebus spevari Kubán, 1995
- Coraebus splendens Peng, 1998
- Coraebus stichai Obenberger, 1924
- Coraebus strnadianus Kubán, 1995
- Coraebus sumatrensis Kerremans, 1894
- Coraebus suturalis Kerremans, 1893
- Coraebus svaneki Kubán, 1997
- Coraebus svihlai Kubán, 1995
- Coraebus taiwanus Akiyama, 1988
- Coraebus tamensis Descarpentries & Villiers, 1967
- Coraebus tazoei Akiyama, 1988
- Coraebus teres Kubán, 1996
- Coraebus thailandicus Kubán, 1995
- Coraebus theryanus Gebhardt, 1926
- Coraebus thoracellus Kerremans, 1900
- Coraebus torigaii Akiyama & Ohmomo, 1993
- Coraebus tubulosus Kubán, 1997
- Coraebus umphangicus Kubán, 1995
- Coraebus undatus (Fabricius, 1787)
- Coraebus vagepictus Obenberger, 1934
- Coraebus vicarius Kubán, 1995
- Coraebus vientianensis Baudon, 1968
- Coraebus vietnamensis Kubán, 1996
- Coraebus violaceipennis Saunders, 1866
- Coraebus viridimicans Akiyama & Ohmomo, 1993
- Coraebus vuilletae Bourgoin, 1925
- Coraebus wiwuti Ohmomo, 2004
- Coraebus yanshanensis Peng, 1991
- Coraebus yuanyunae Peng, 1998
- Coraebus zhangi Peng, 1989
- Coraebus zhejiangensis Peng, 1998
- Coraebus zonatus Kubán, 1996
- Coraebus zoufali Obenberger, 1930
