= Trachys =

Trachys may refer to:

- Trachys (plant), a genus of grass
- Trachys (beetle), a genus of beetles
