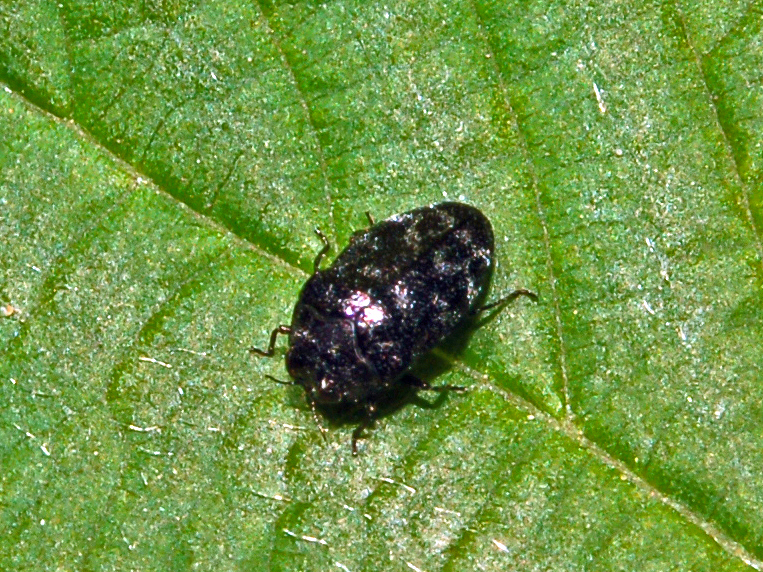

Scientific classification
- Kingdom: Animalia
- Phylum: Arthropoda
- Class: Insecta
- Order: Coleoptera
- Suborder: Polyphaga
- Infraorder: Elateriformia
- Family: Buprestidae
- Genus: Trachys
- Species: T. minutus

Binomial name
- Trachys minutus (Linnaeus, 1758)

Synonyms
- Trachys minuta (Linnaeus, 1758); Buprestis minuta Linnaeus, 1758

= Trachys minutus =

Species of beetle

Trachys minutus is a species of beetle belonging to the family Buprestidae.

== Description ==
Trachys minutus is a beetle of the small size reaching a length of 3 to 3.5 millimeters. It is dark colored, shiny and slightly hairy. The female lays eggs on the leaves of deciduous trees, especially elm (Ulmus). The larvae eat the green tissue between the upper and lower layer of the leaves, making cavities called mines.

== Distribution ==
This species is present in most of Europe, the eastern Palearctic realm, and the Near East.

== Subspecies ==
- Trachys minutus minutus (Linnaeus, 1758)
- Trachys minutus salicis (Lewis, 1893)
