= Trachys troglodytiformis =

Scientific classification
- Domain: Eukaryota
- Kingdom: Animalia
- Phylum: Arthropoda
- Class: Insecta
- Order: Coleoptera
- Suborder: Polyphaga
- Infraorder: Elateriformia
- Family: Buprestidae
- Genus: Trachys
- Species: T. troglodytiformis

Binomial name
- Trachys troglodytiformis Obenberger, 1918

Species of beetle

Trachys troglodytiformis is a species of metallic wood-boring beetle in the family Buprestidae. It is found natively in Europe and it has been introduced to Northern Asia (excluding China) and North America. Larvae are known leaf miners of Malvaceae.

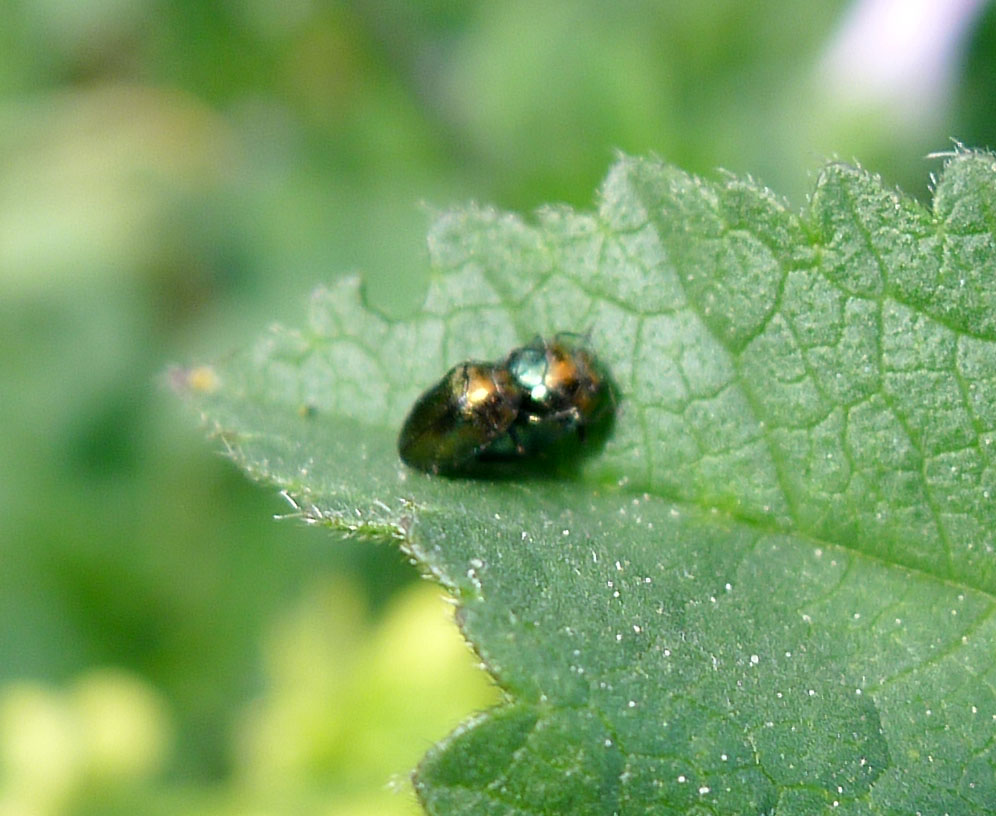
