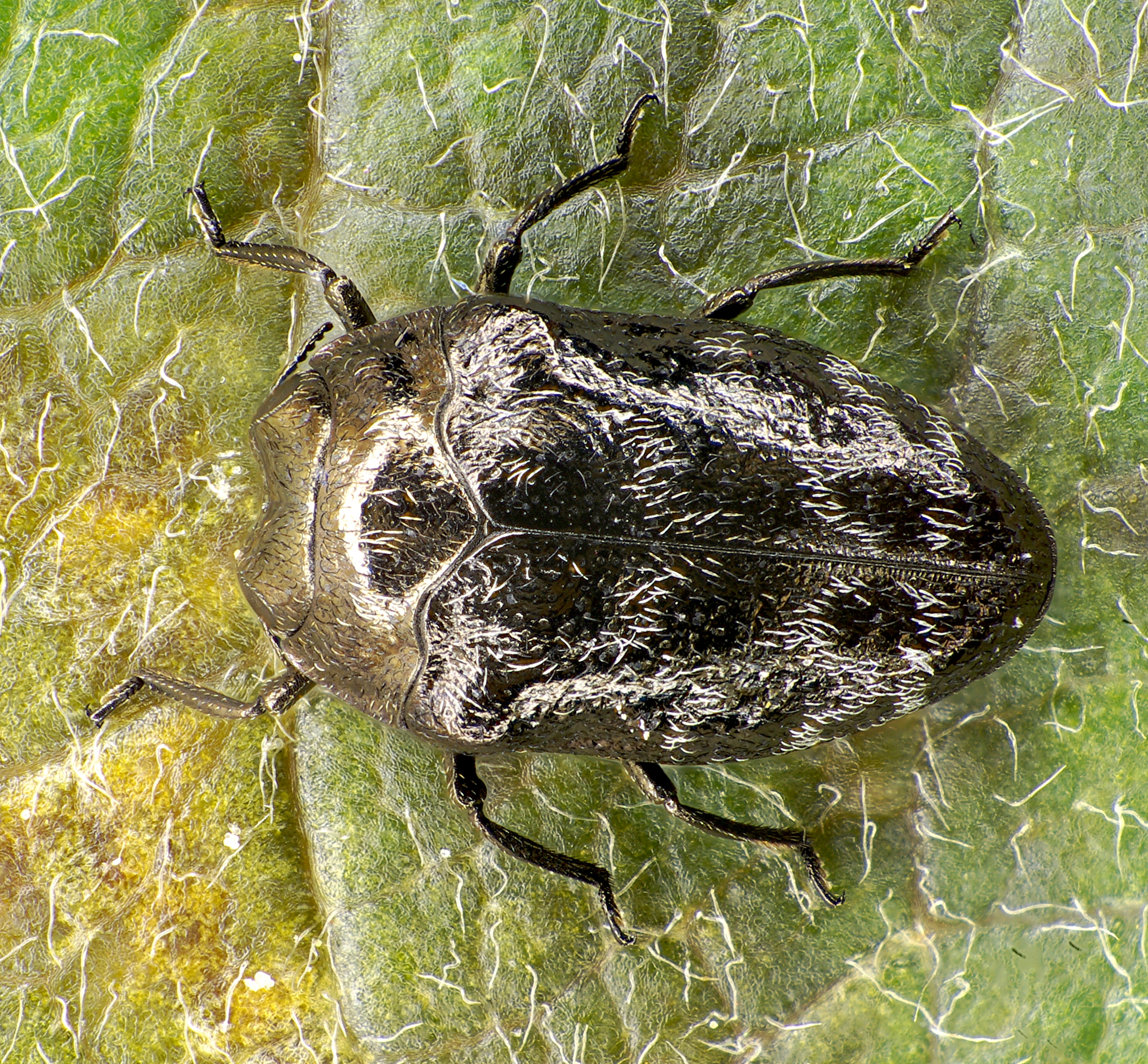
- Trachys minutus, Germany

Scientific classification
- Kingdom: Animalia
- Phylum: Arthropoda
- Class: Insecta
- Order: Coleoptera
- Suborder: Polyphaga
- Infraorder: Elateriformia
- Family: Buprestidae
- Subfamily: Agrilinae
- Tribe: Tracheini
- Genus: Trachys; Fabricius, 1801

Synonyms
- Phytotera Gistel, 1856

= Trachys (beetle) =

Genus of beetles

Trachys is a genus of leaf-mining jewel beetles in the family Buprestidae. There are more than 600 described species in Trachys, found mainly in Europe, Africa, and Asia.

== Gallery ==
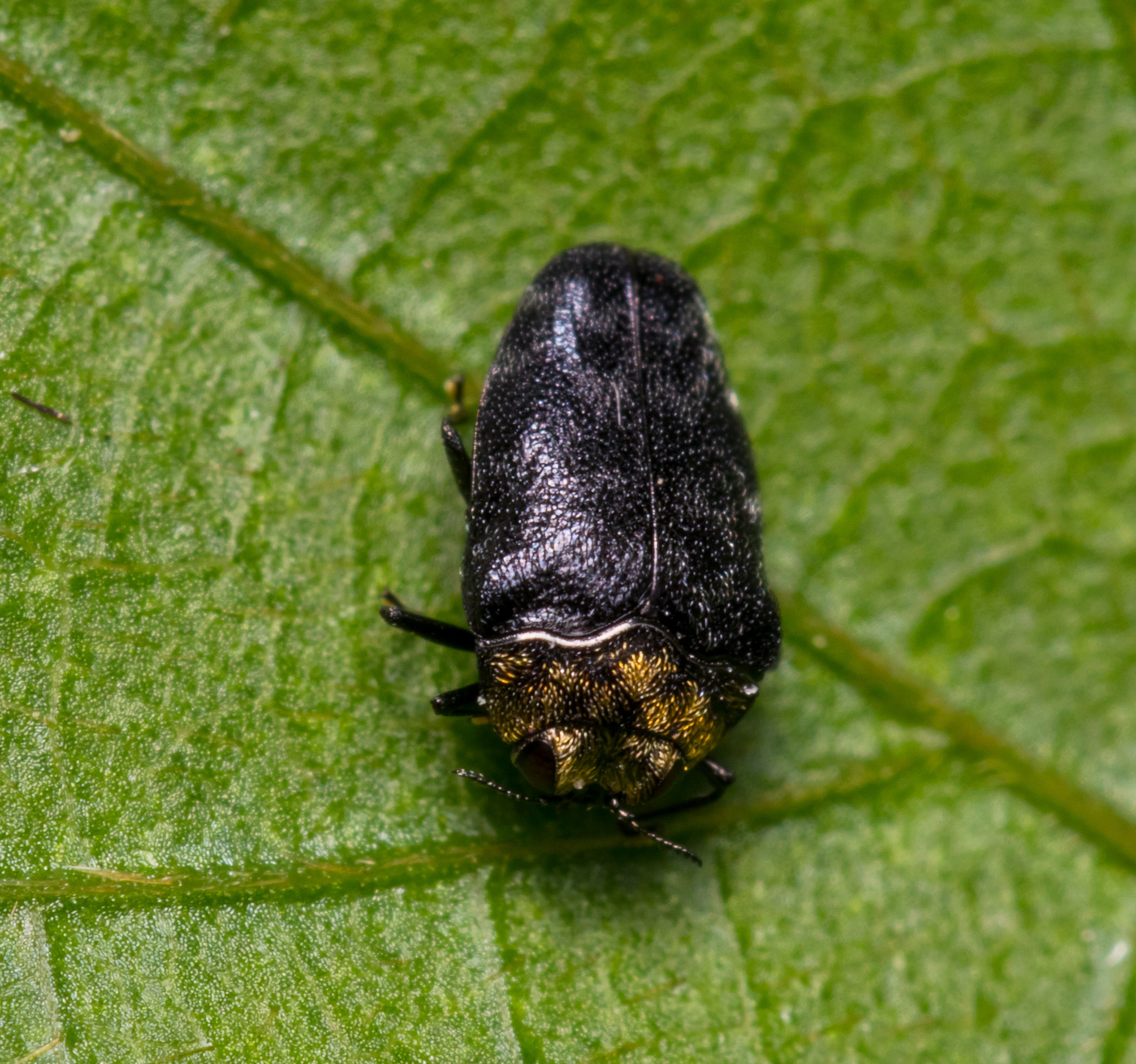
Trachys auricollis, China

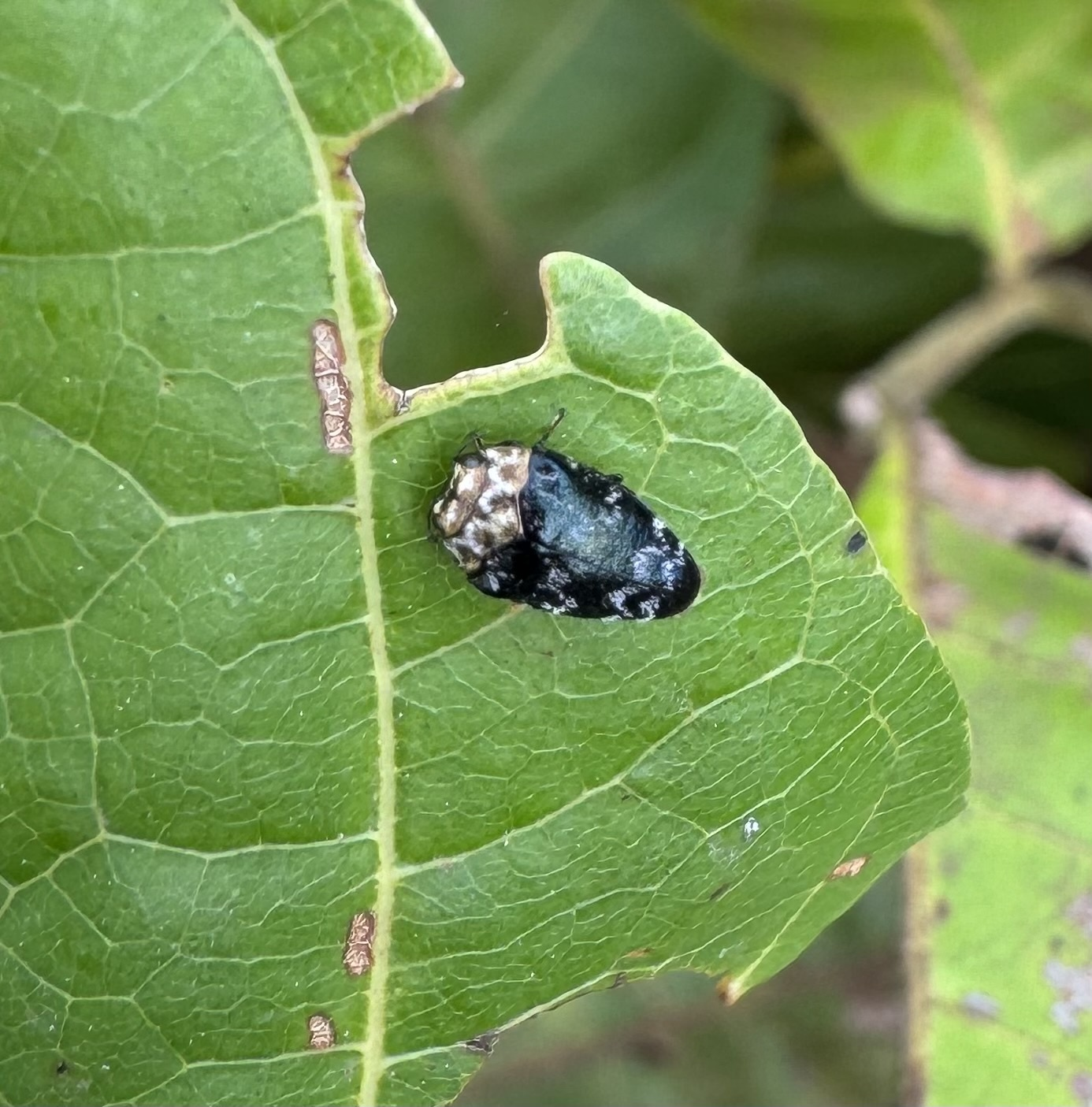
Trachys bicolor, India

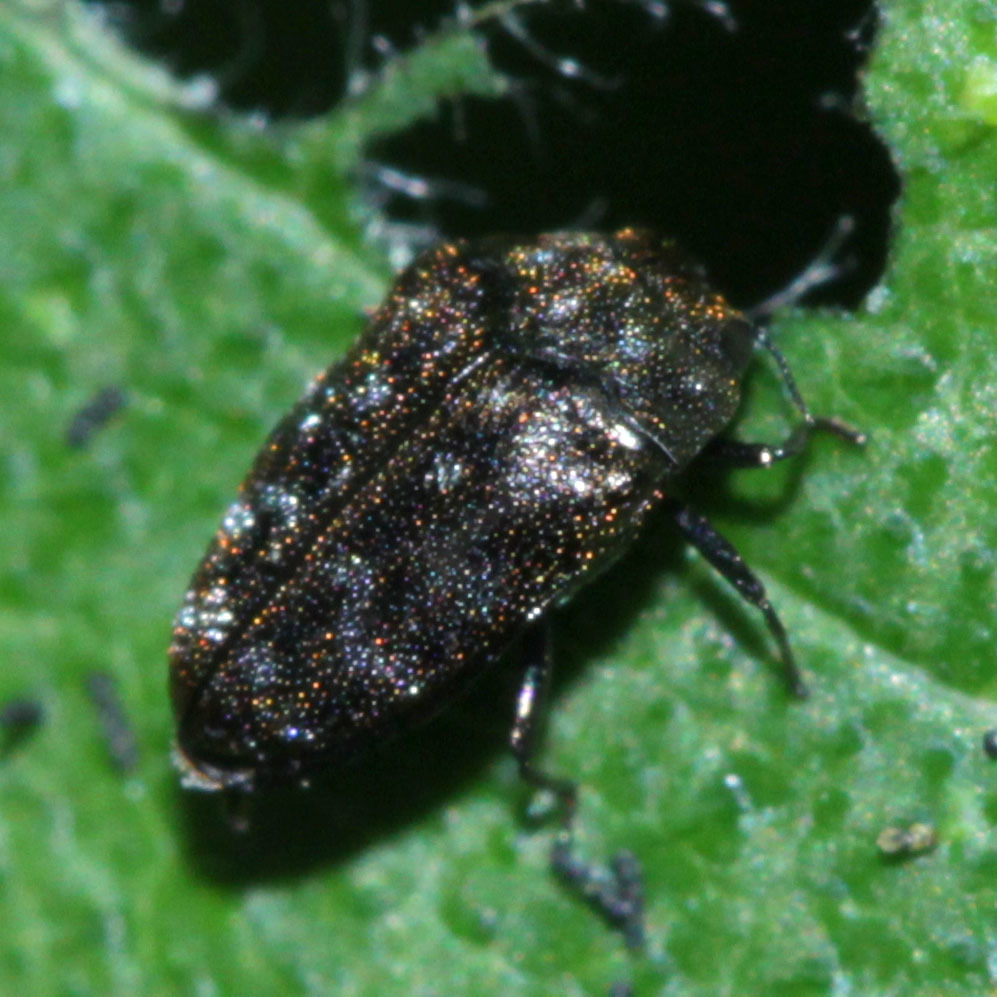
Trachys broussonetiae, Japan

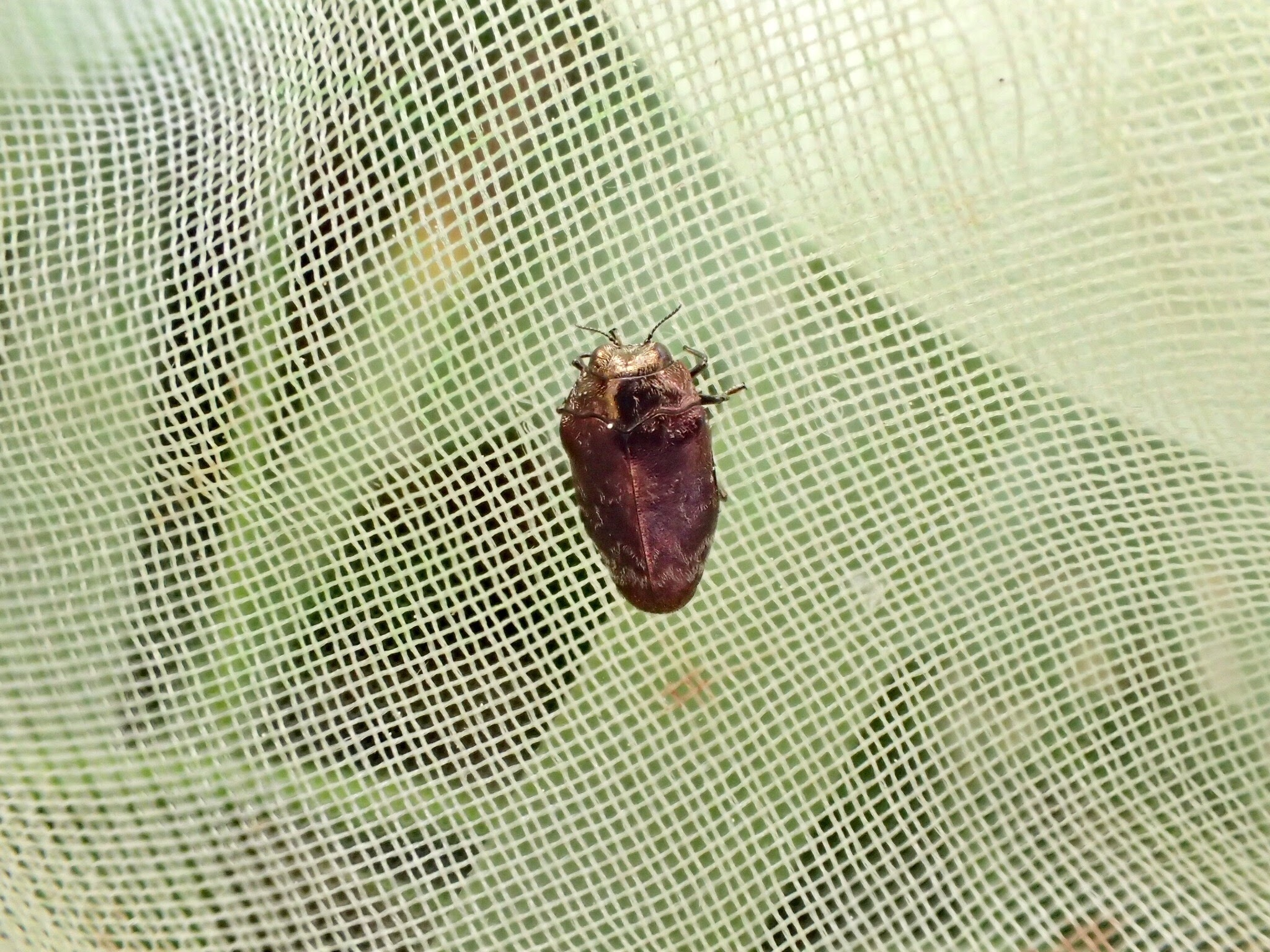
Trachys cupricolor, Japan

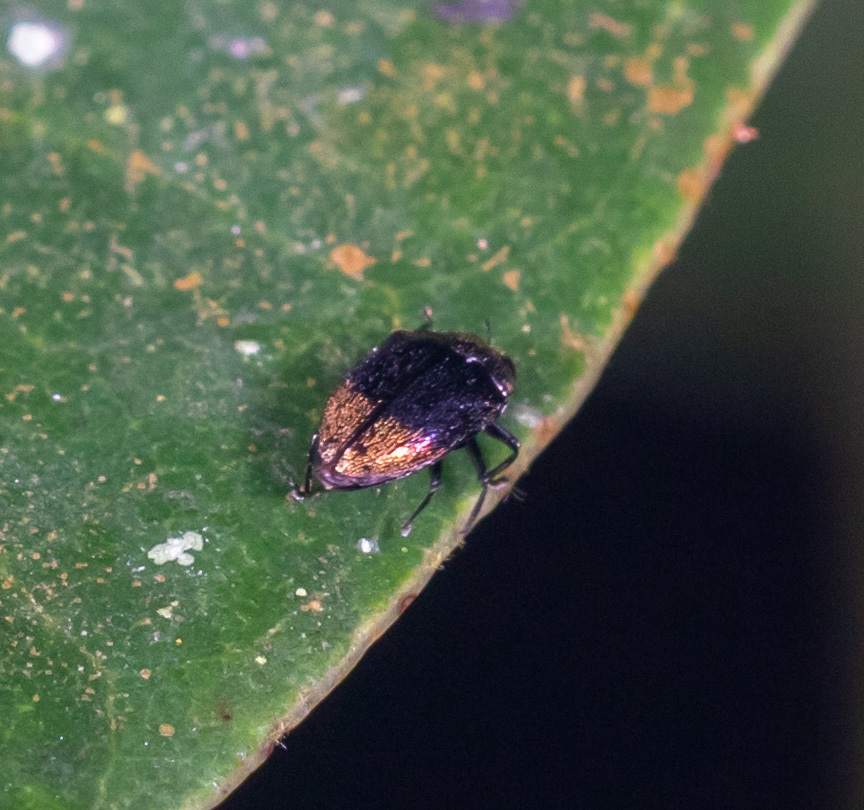
Trachys cupripyga, Malaysia

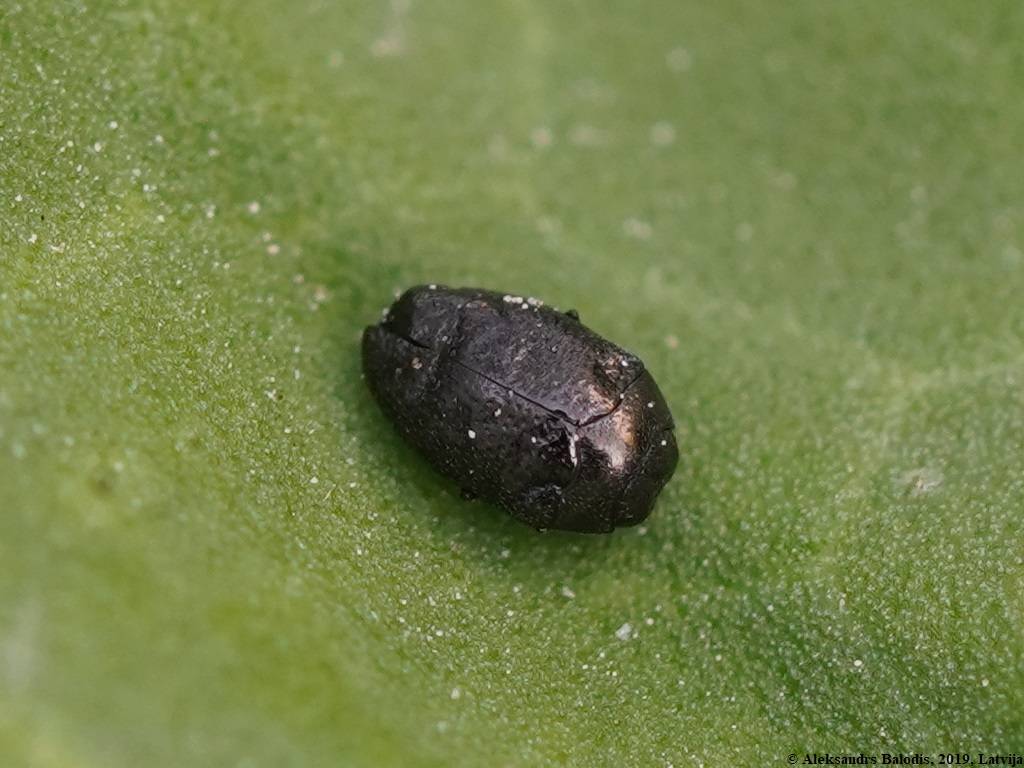
Trachys fragariae, Latvia

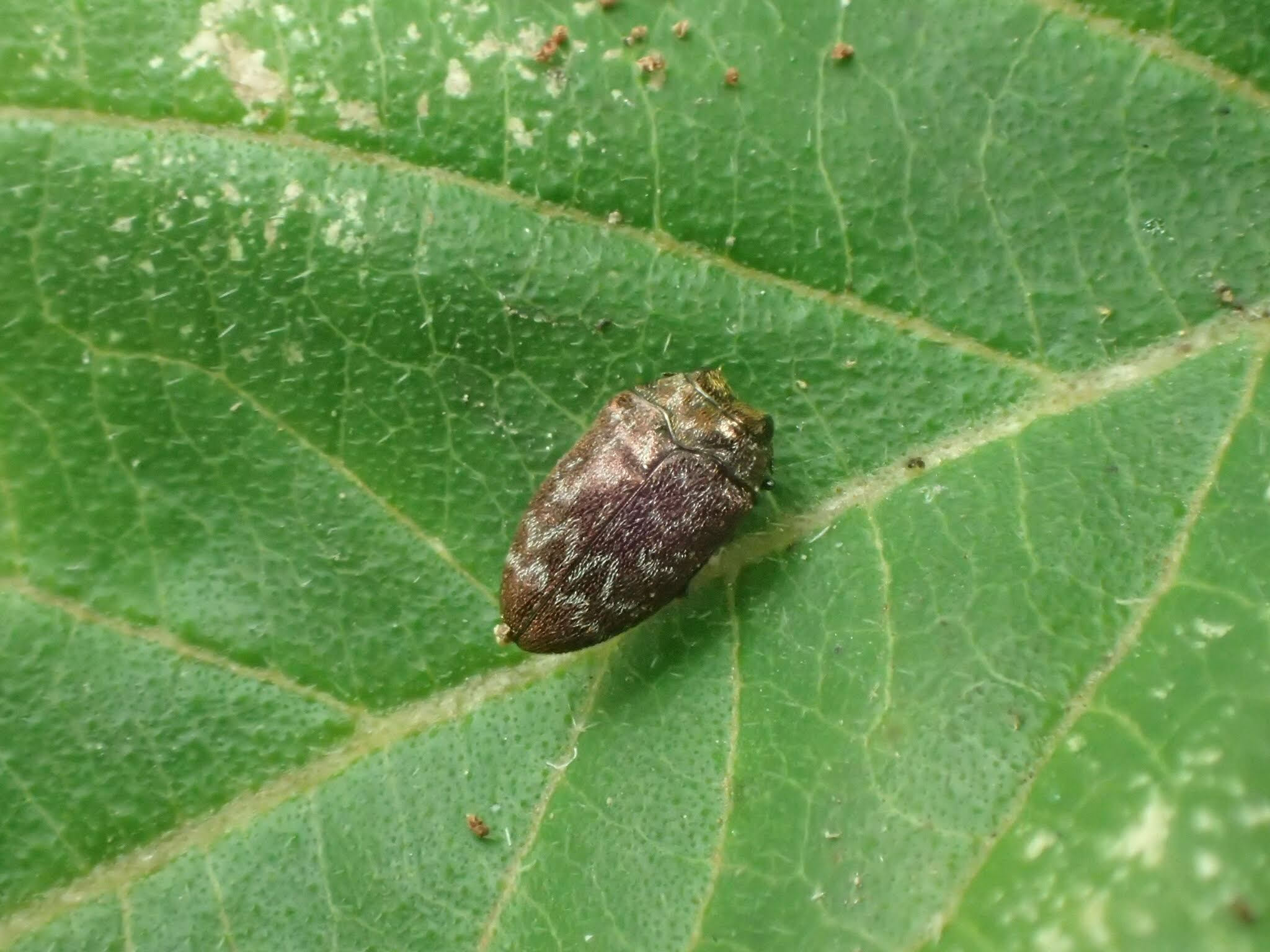
Trachys griseofasciatus, Japan

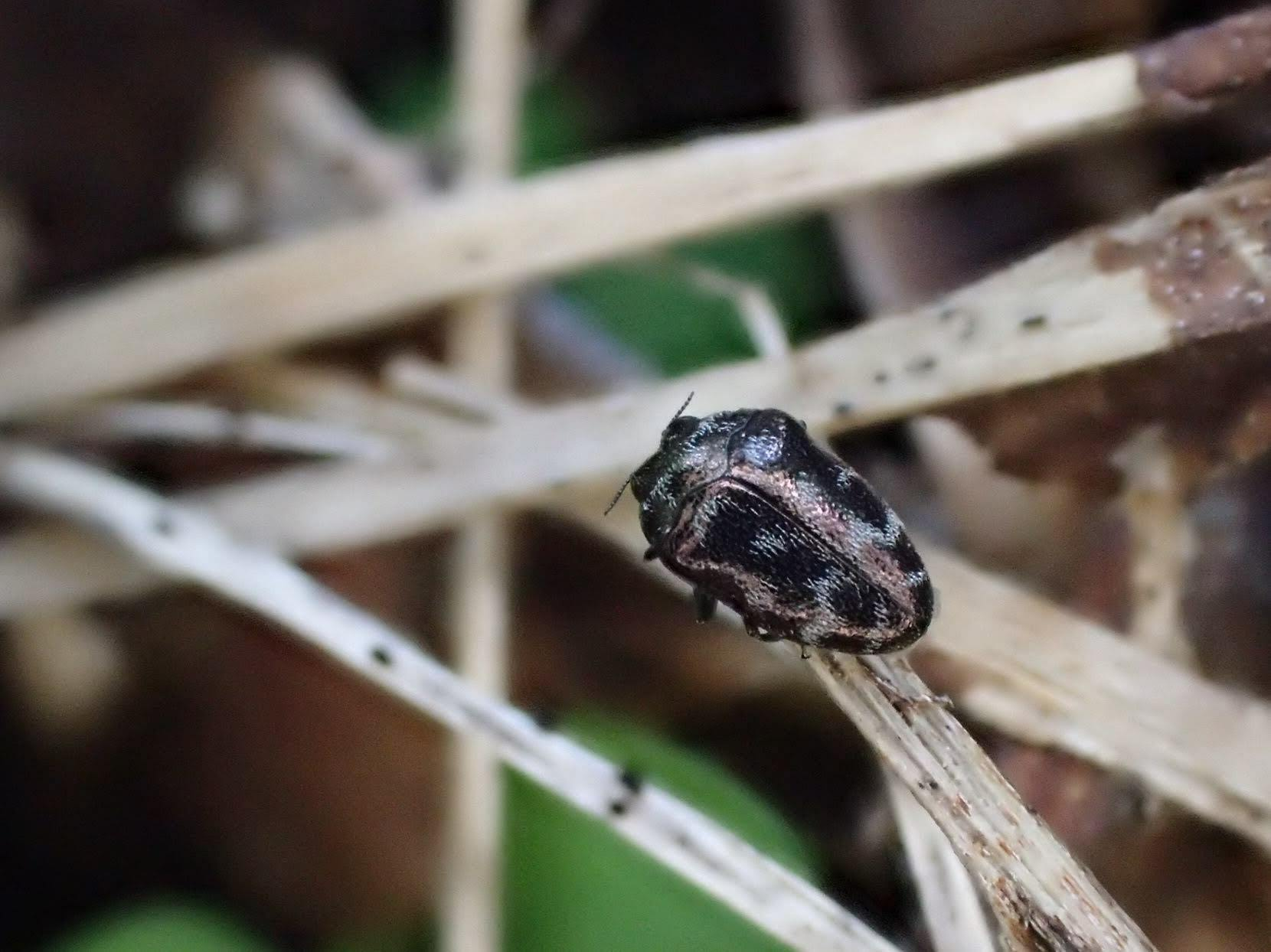
Trachys inconspicuus, Japan

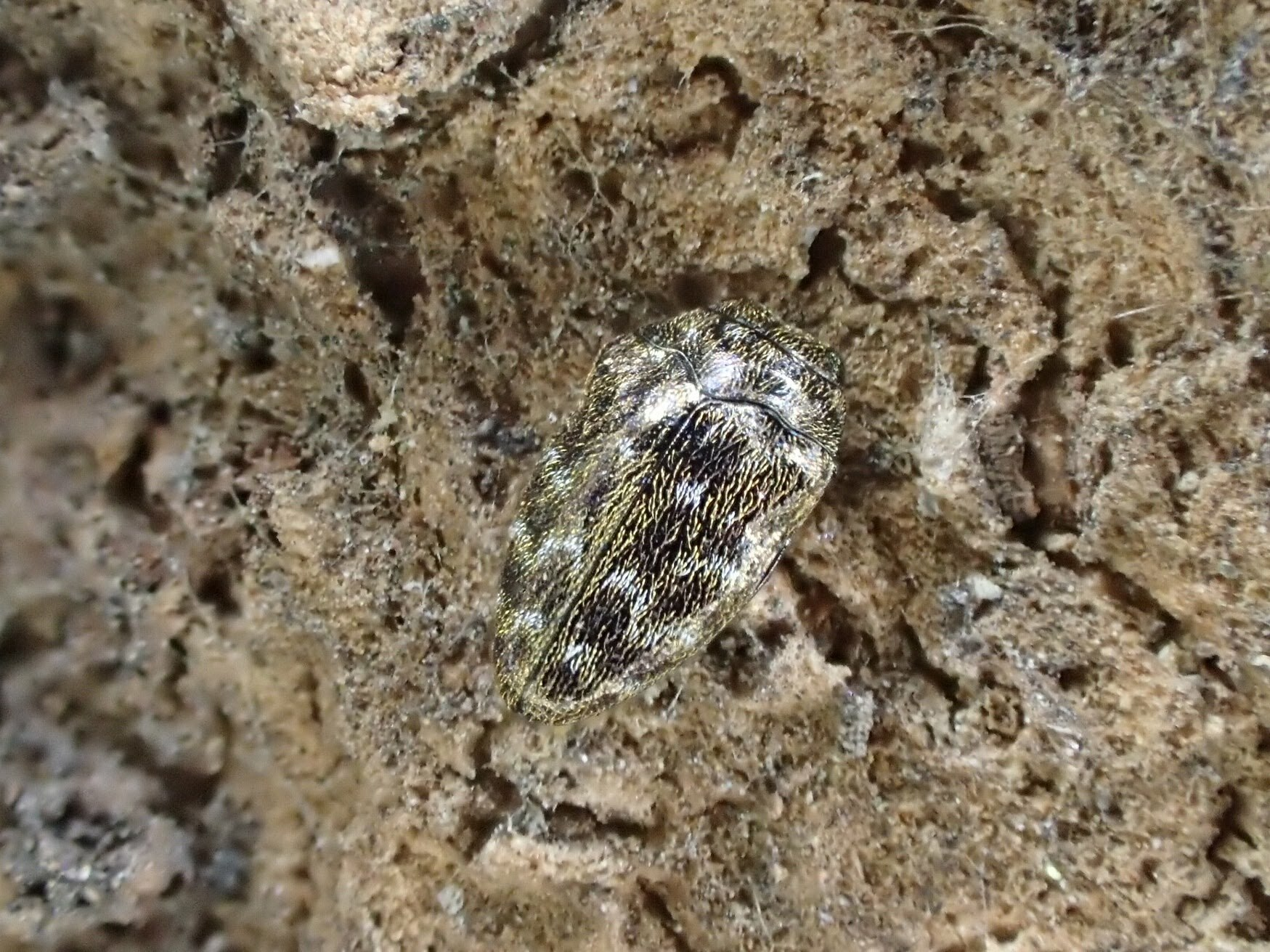
Trachys ineditus, Japan

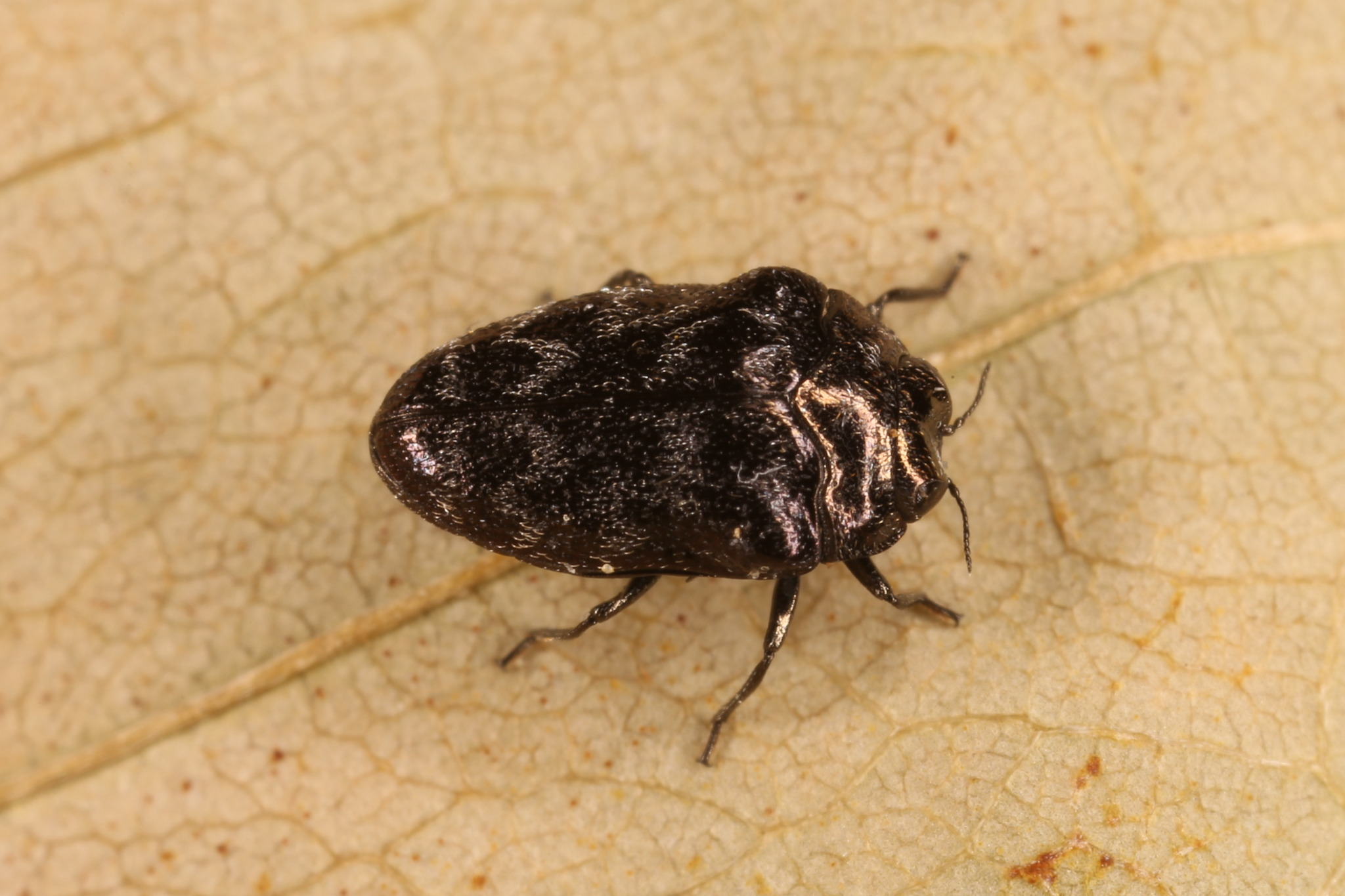
Trachys minutus, Austria

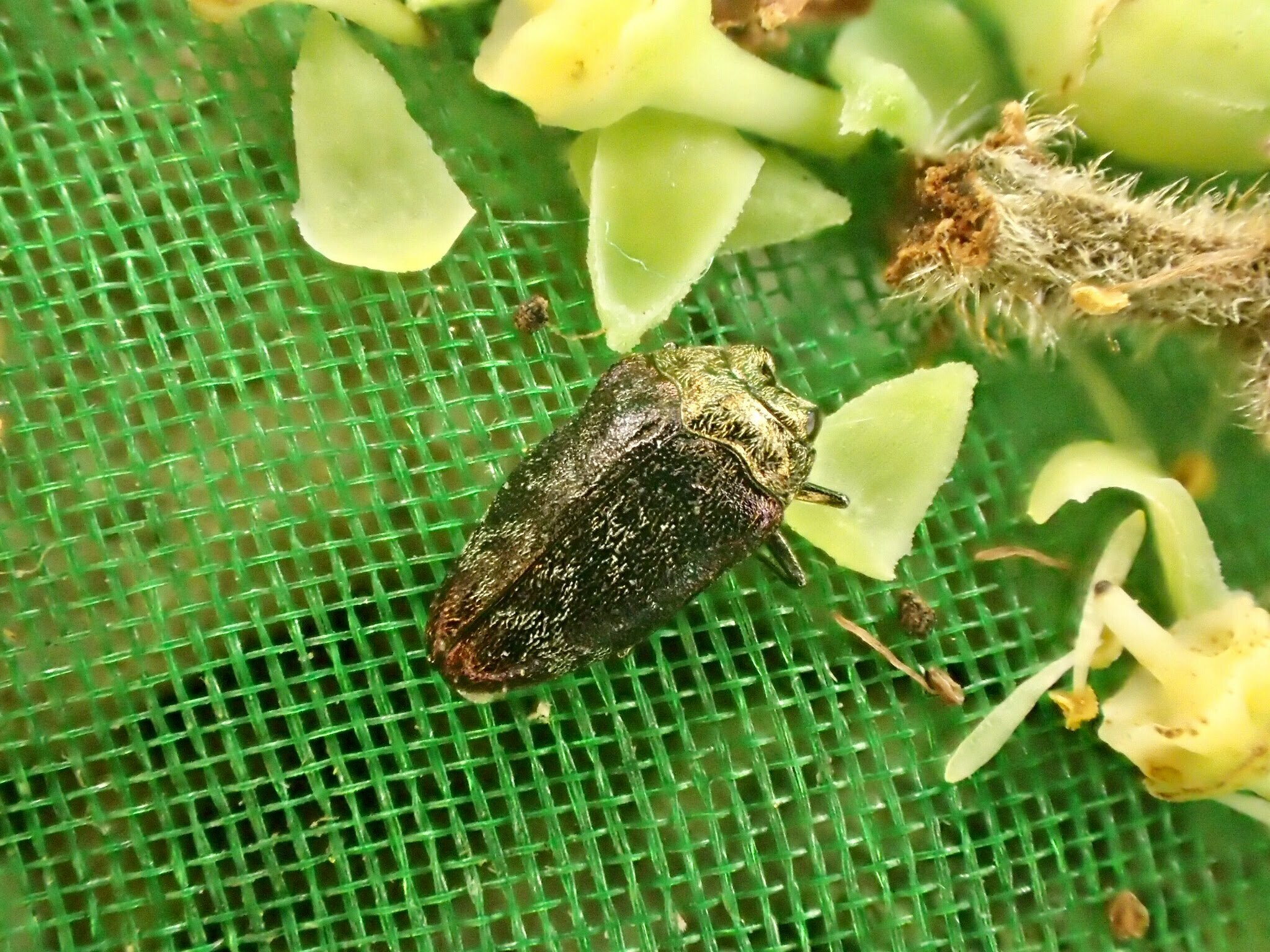
Trachys pecirkai, Japan

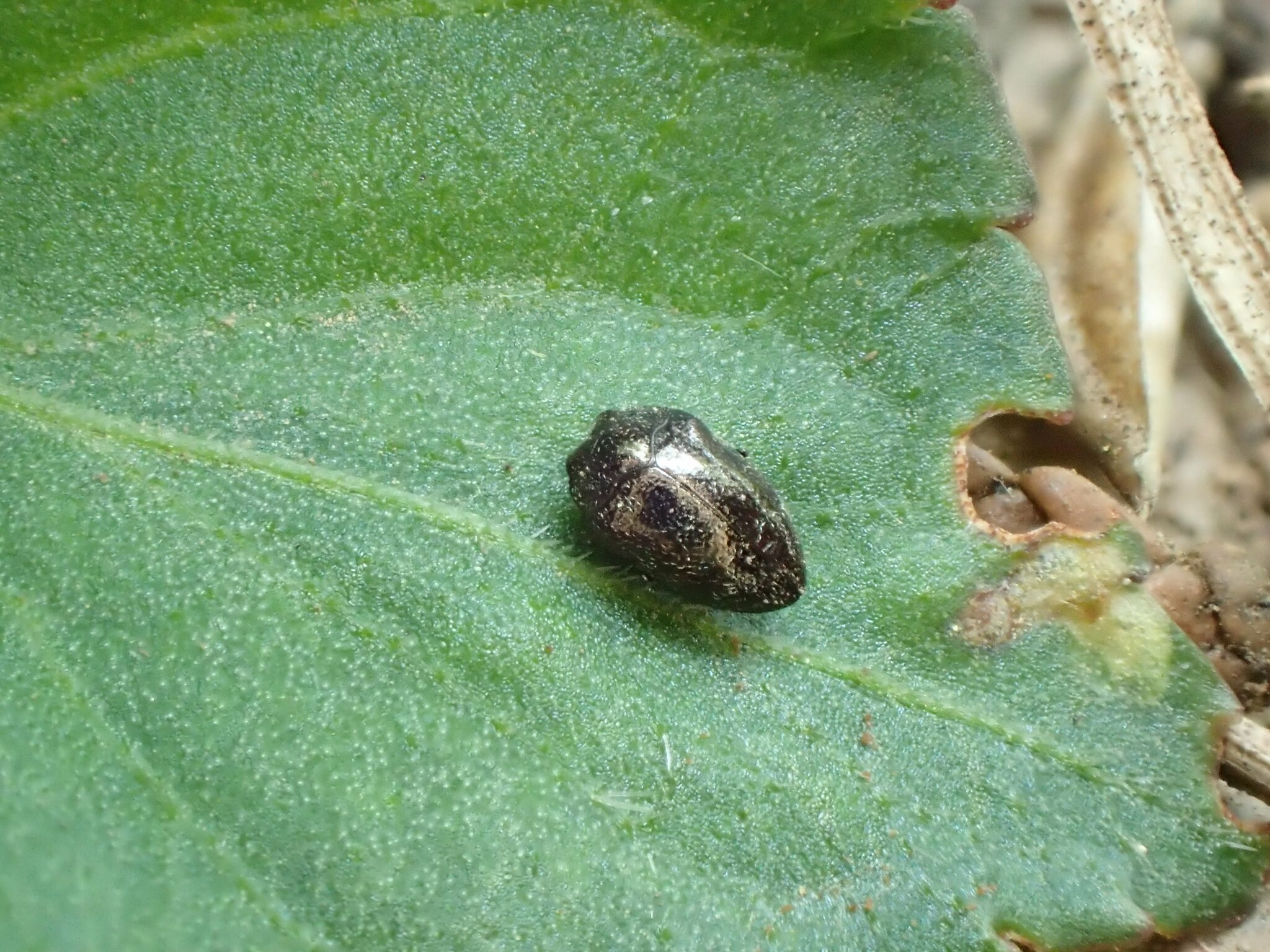
Trachys pseudoscrobiculatus, Japan

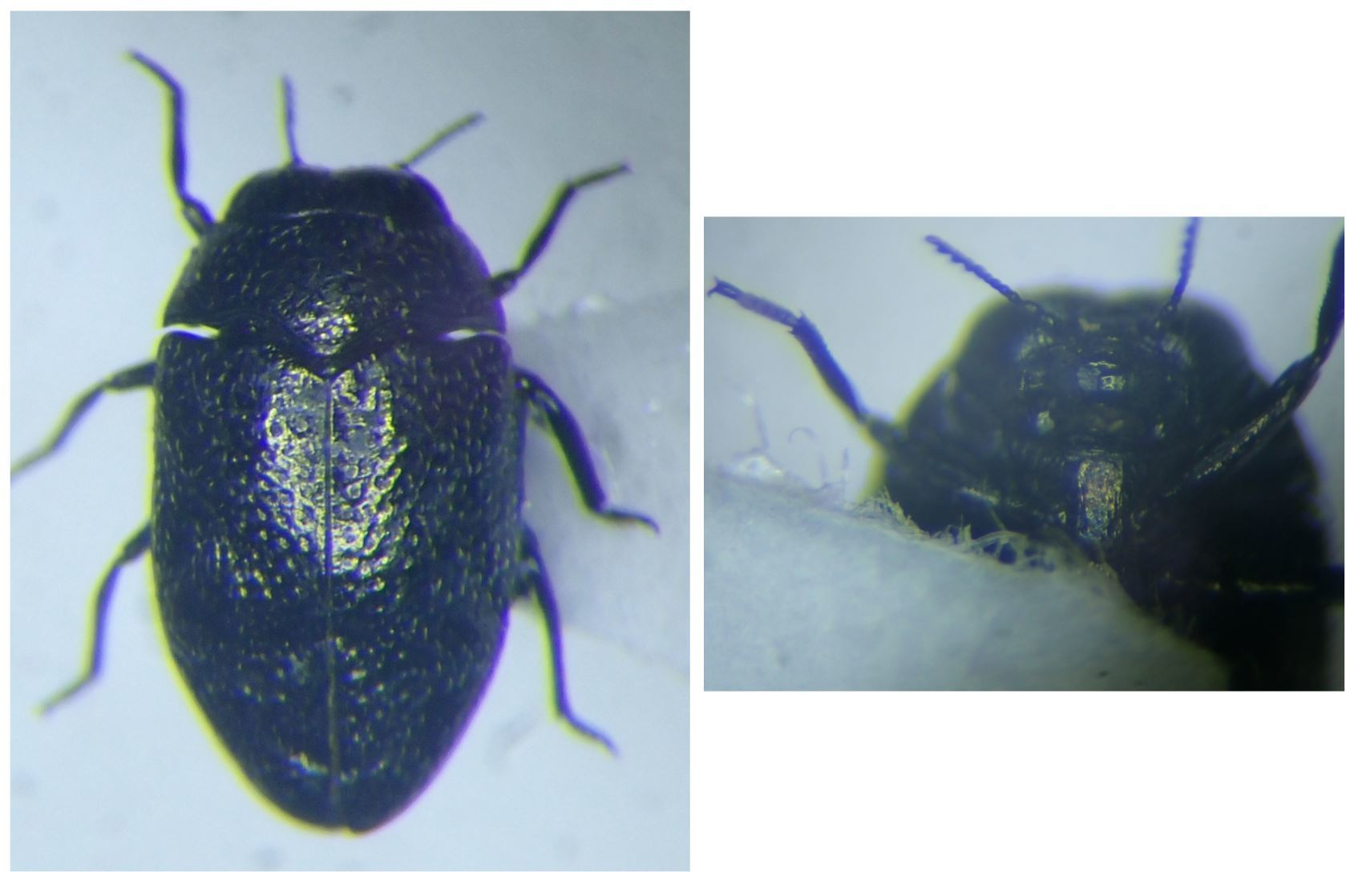
Trachys quercicolus, France

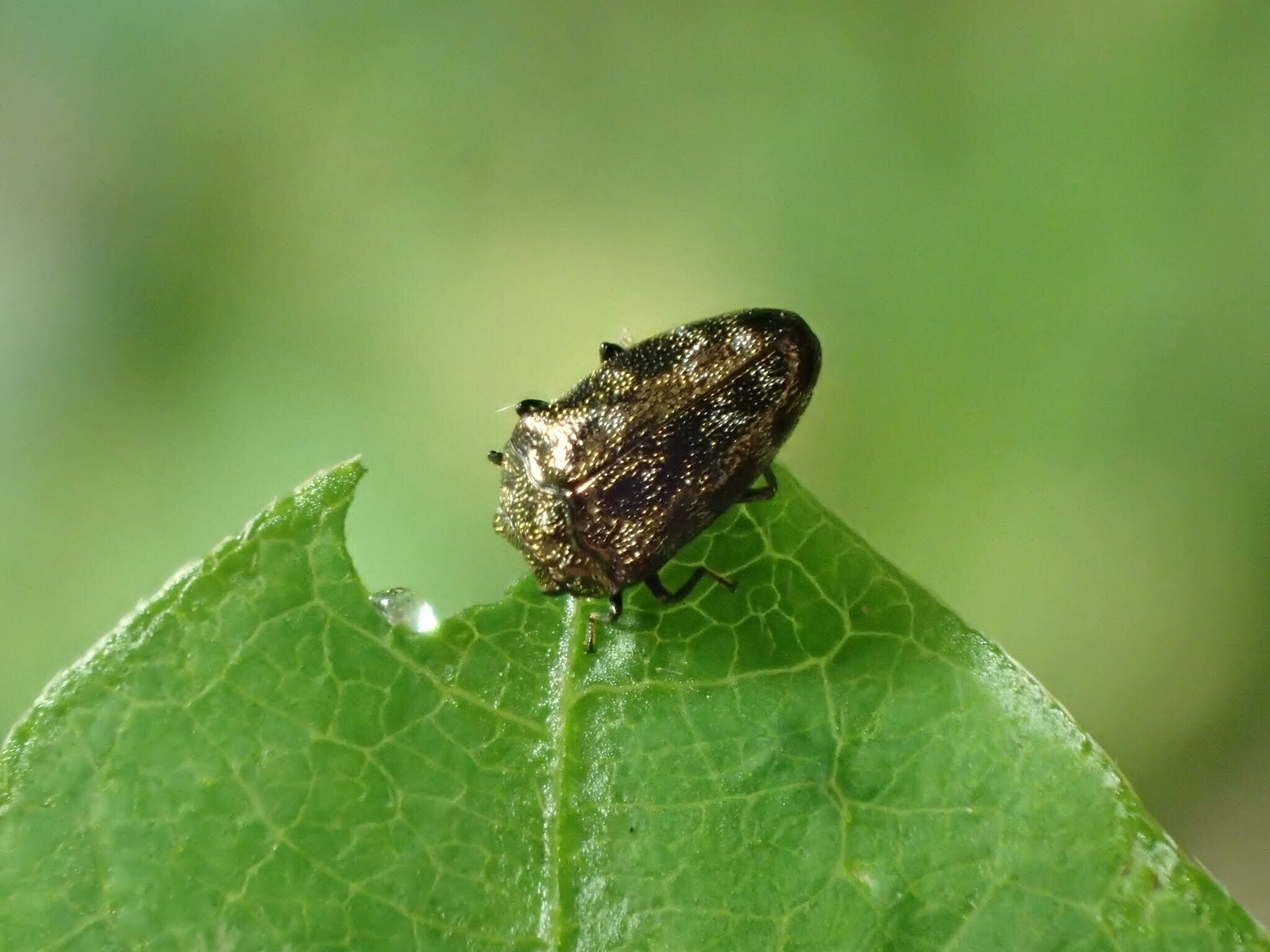
Trachys reitteri, Japan

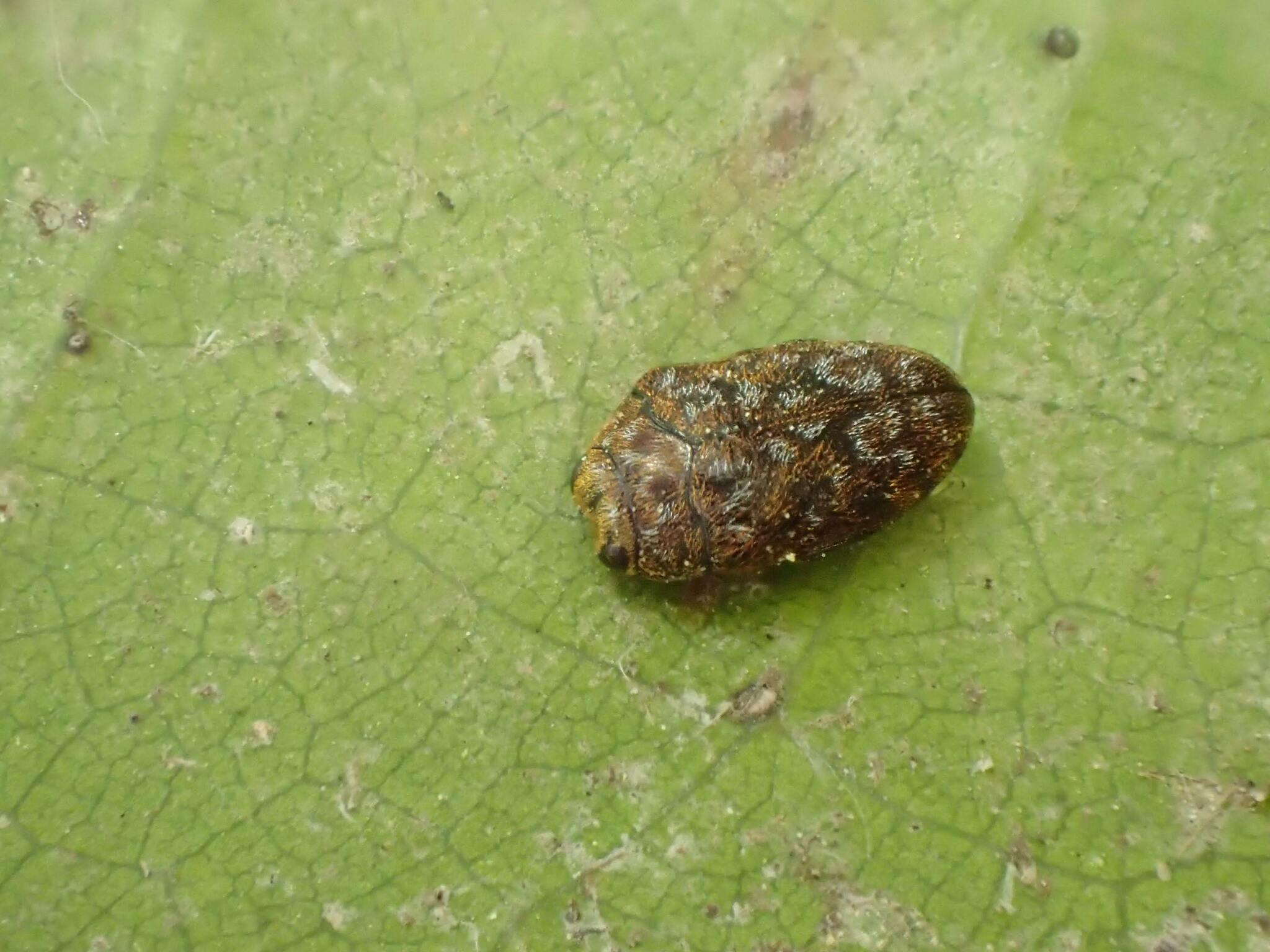
Trachys robustus, Japan

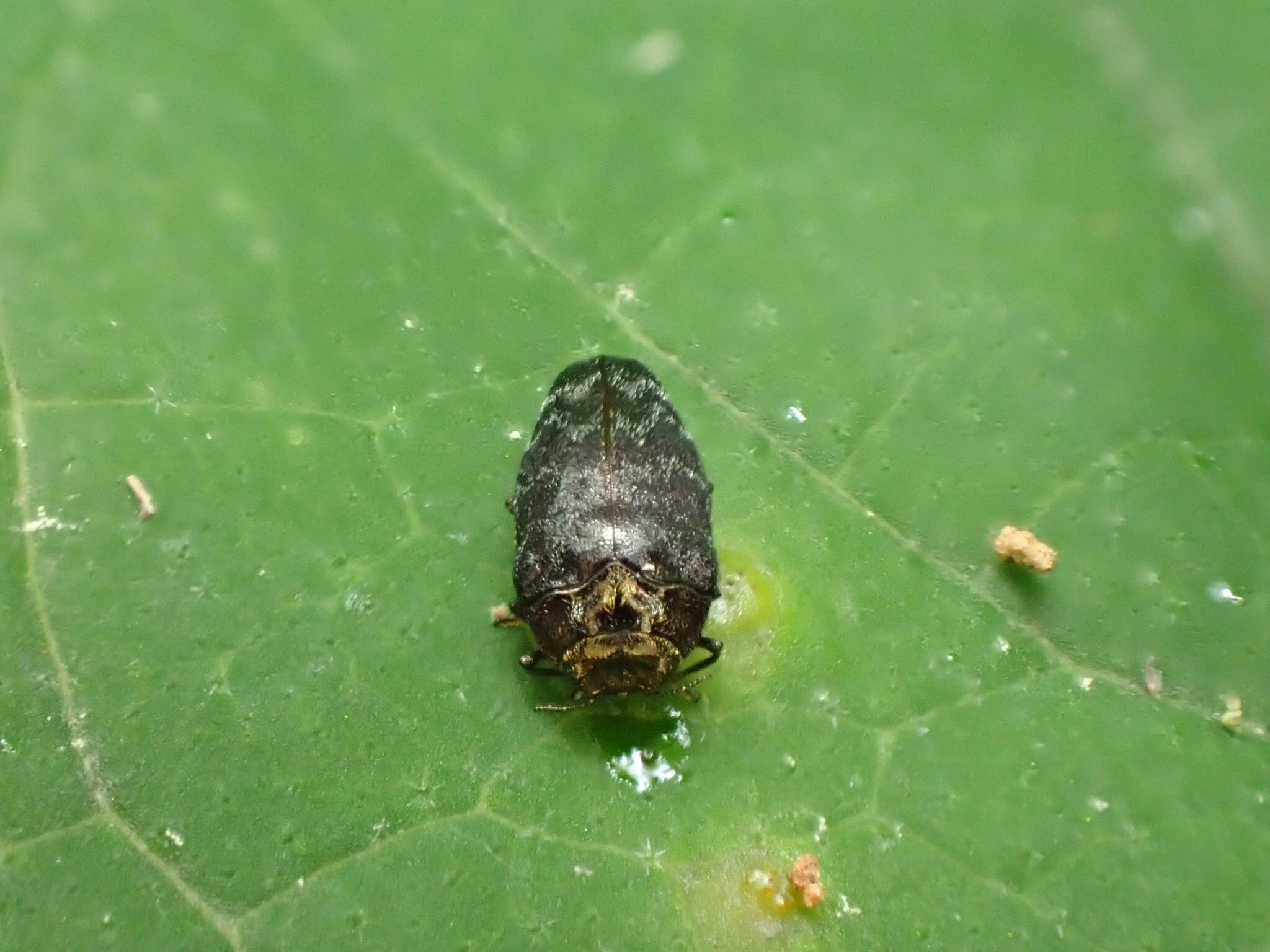
Trachys saundersi, Japan

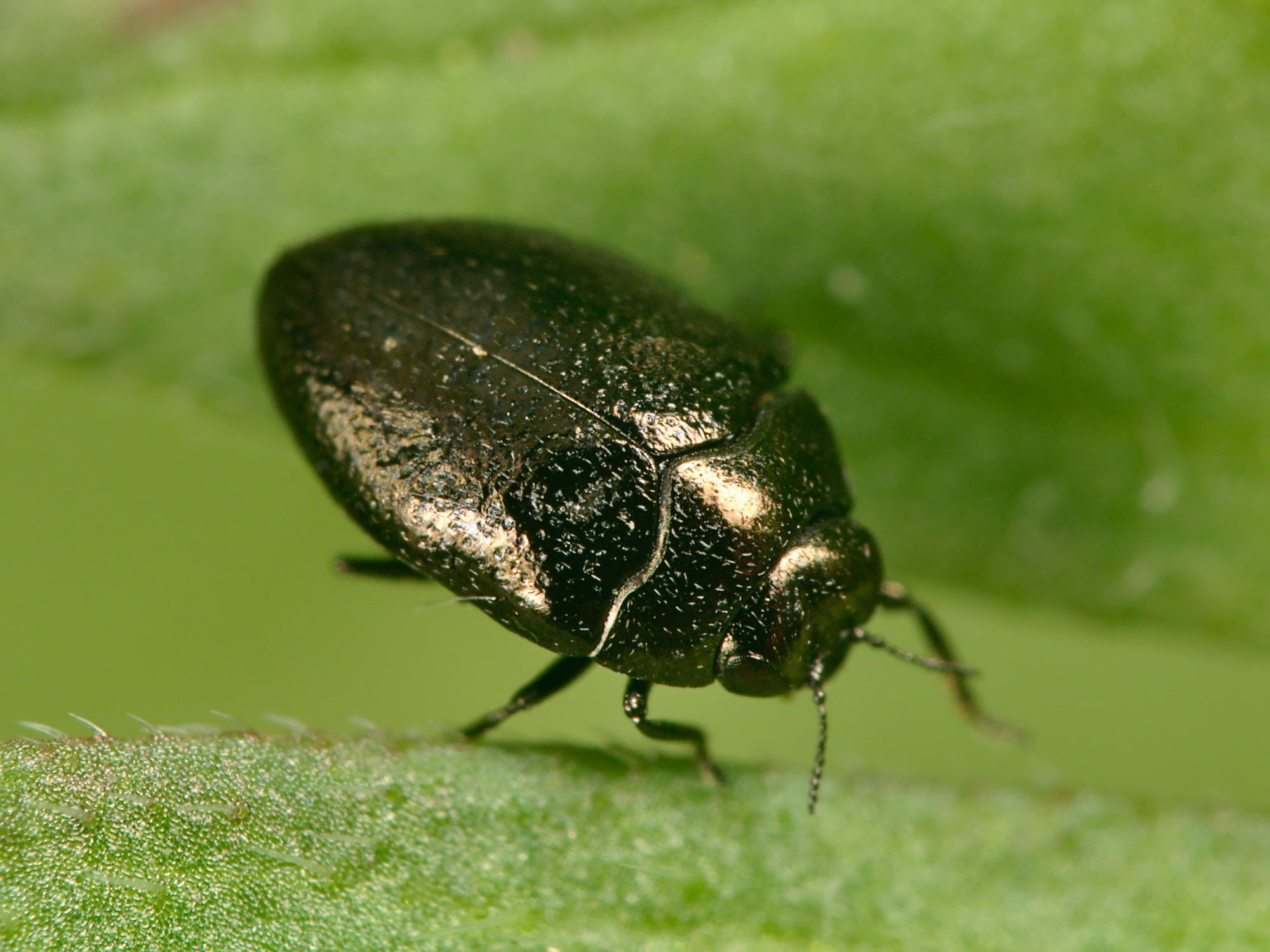
Trachys scrobiculatus, Belgium

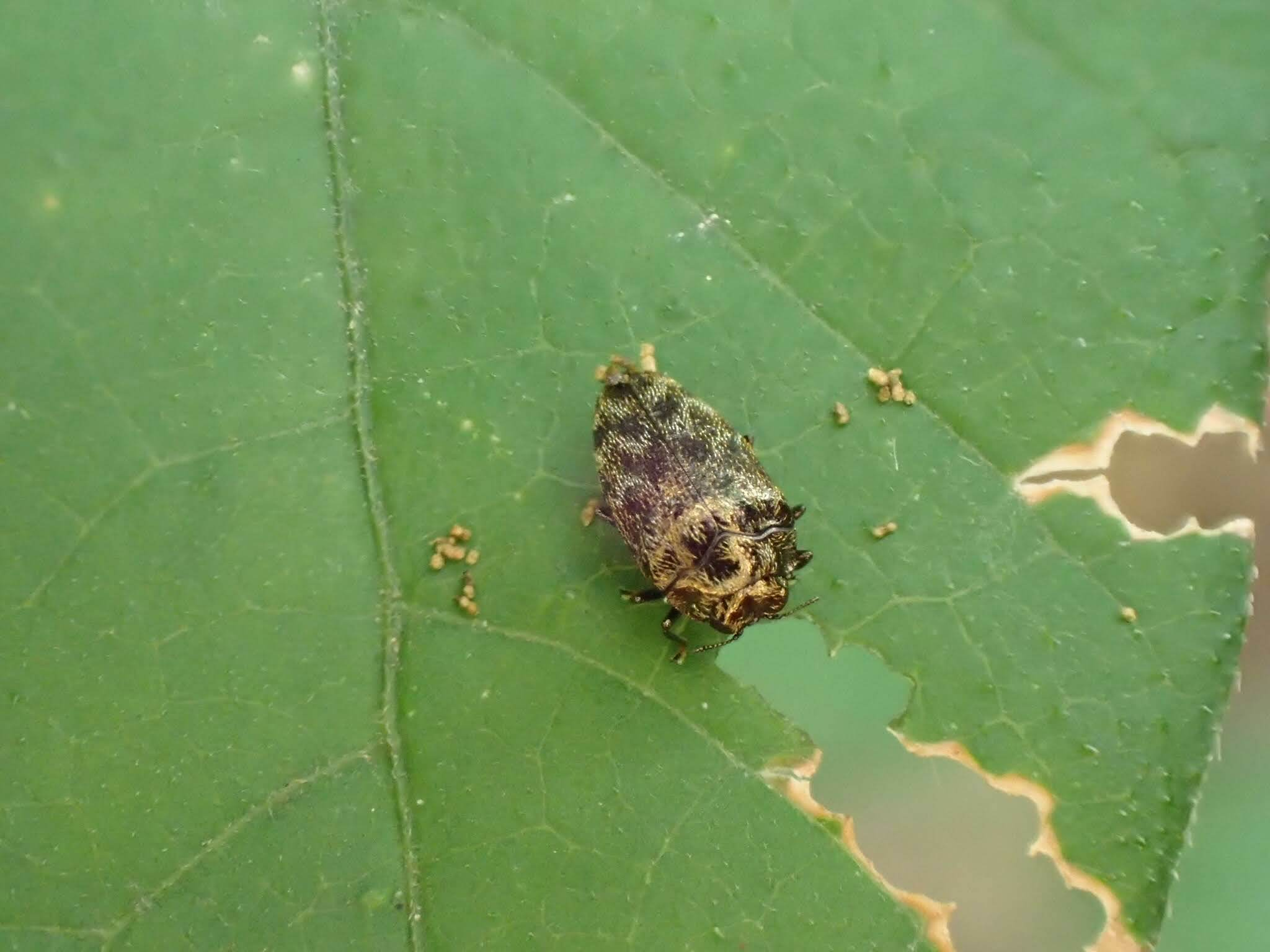
Trachys tokyoensis, Japan

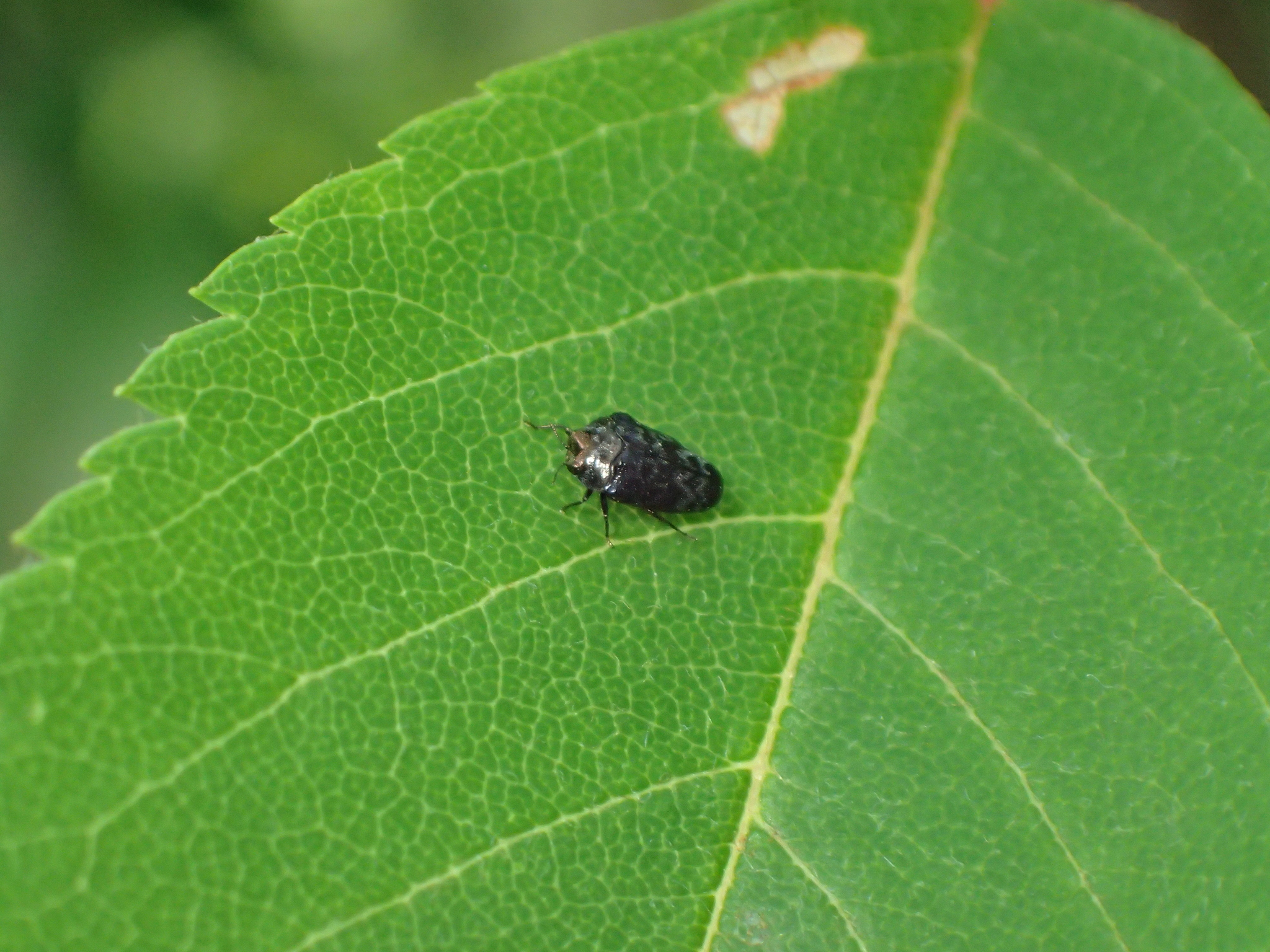
Trachys toringoi, Japan

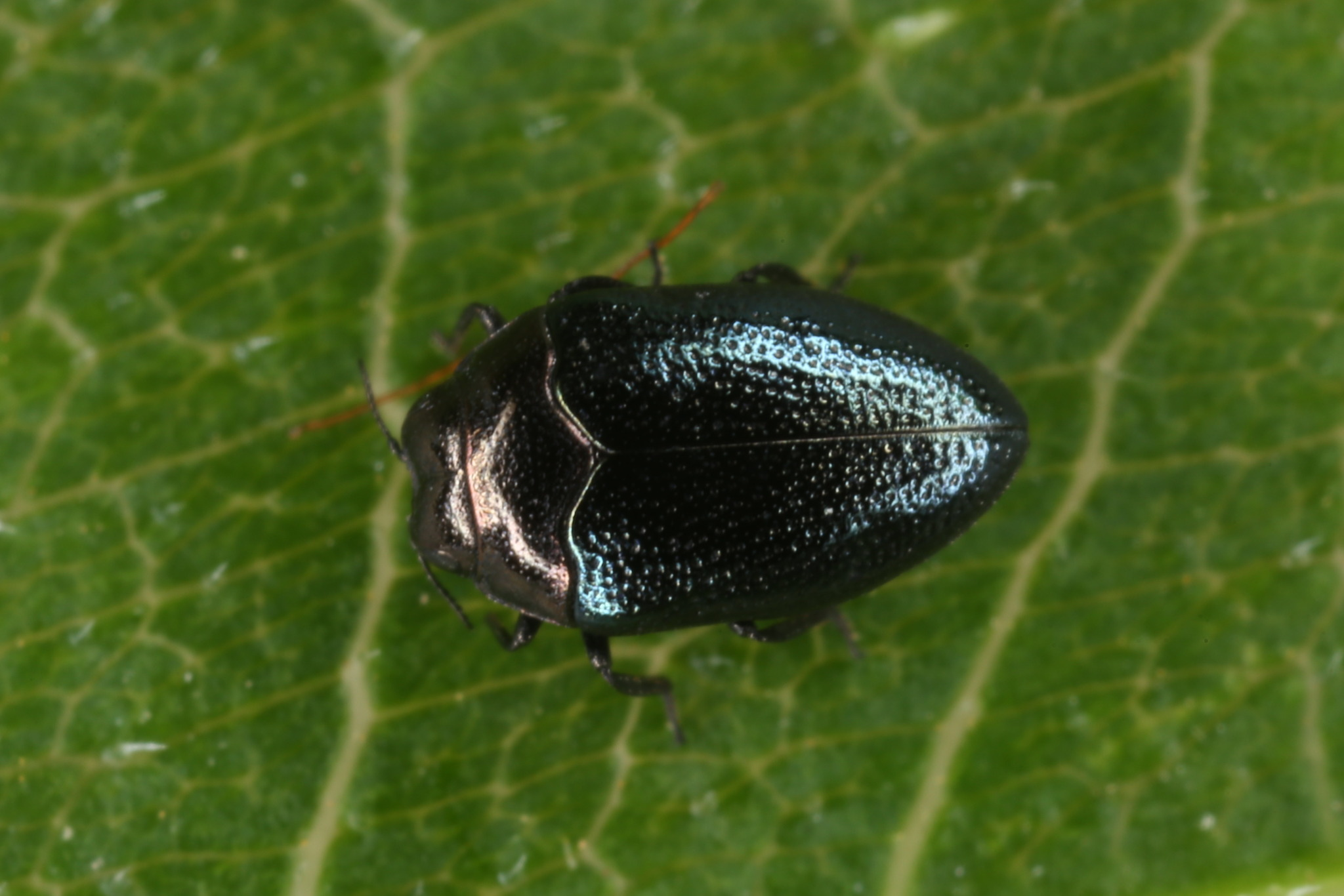
Trachys troglodytes, Austria

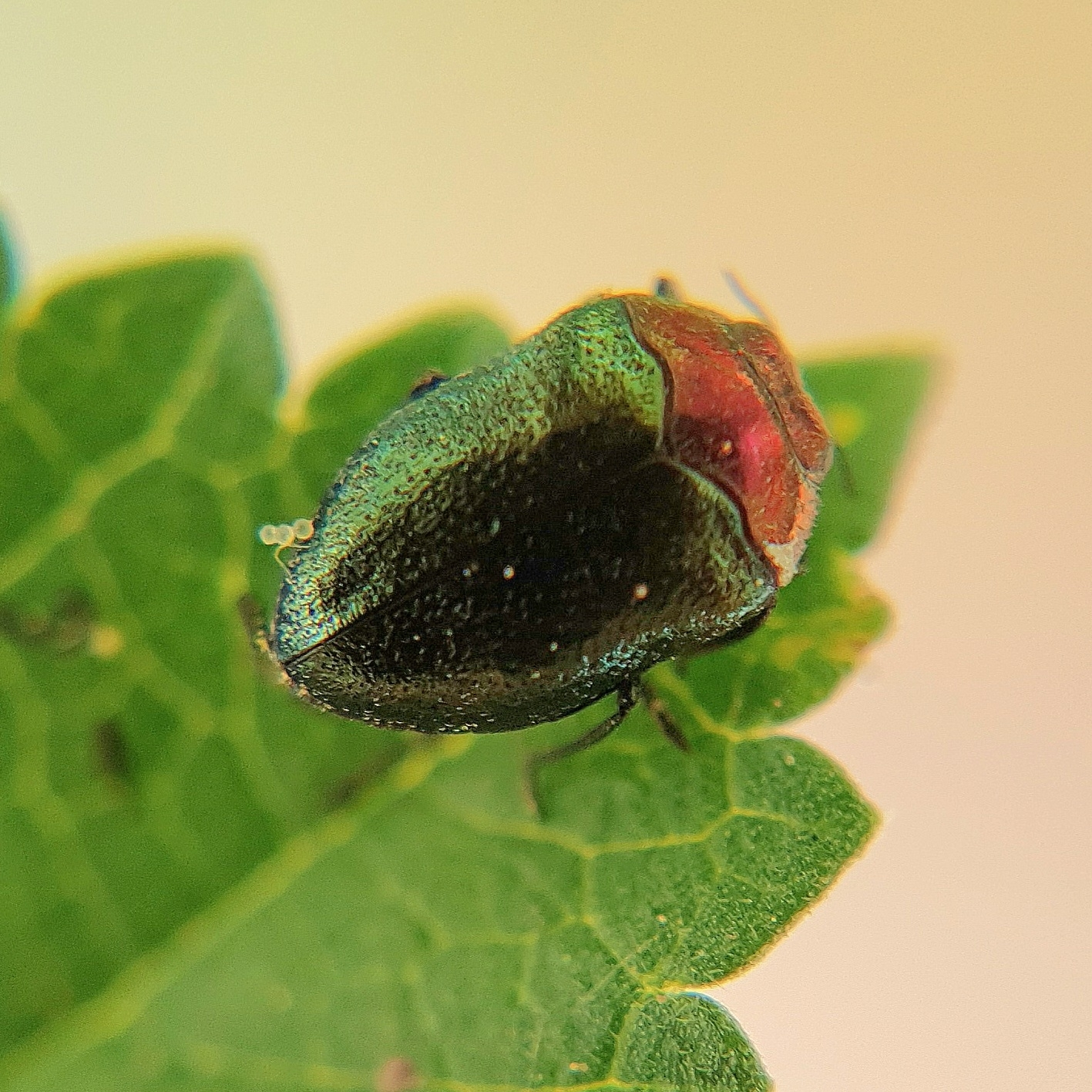
Trachys troglodytiformis, Algeria

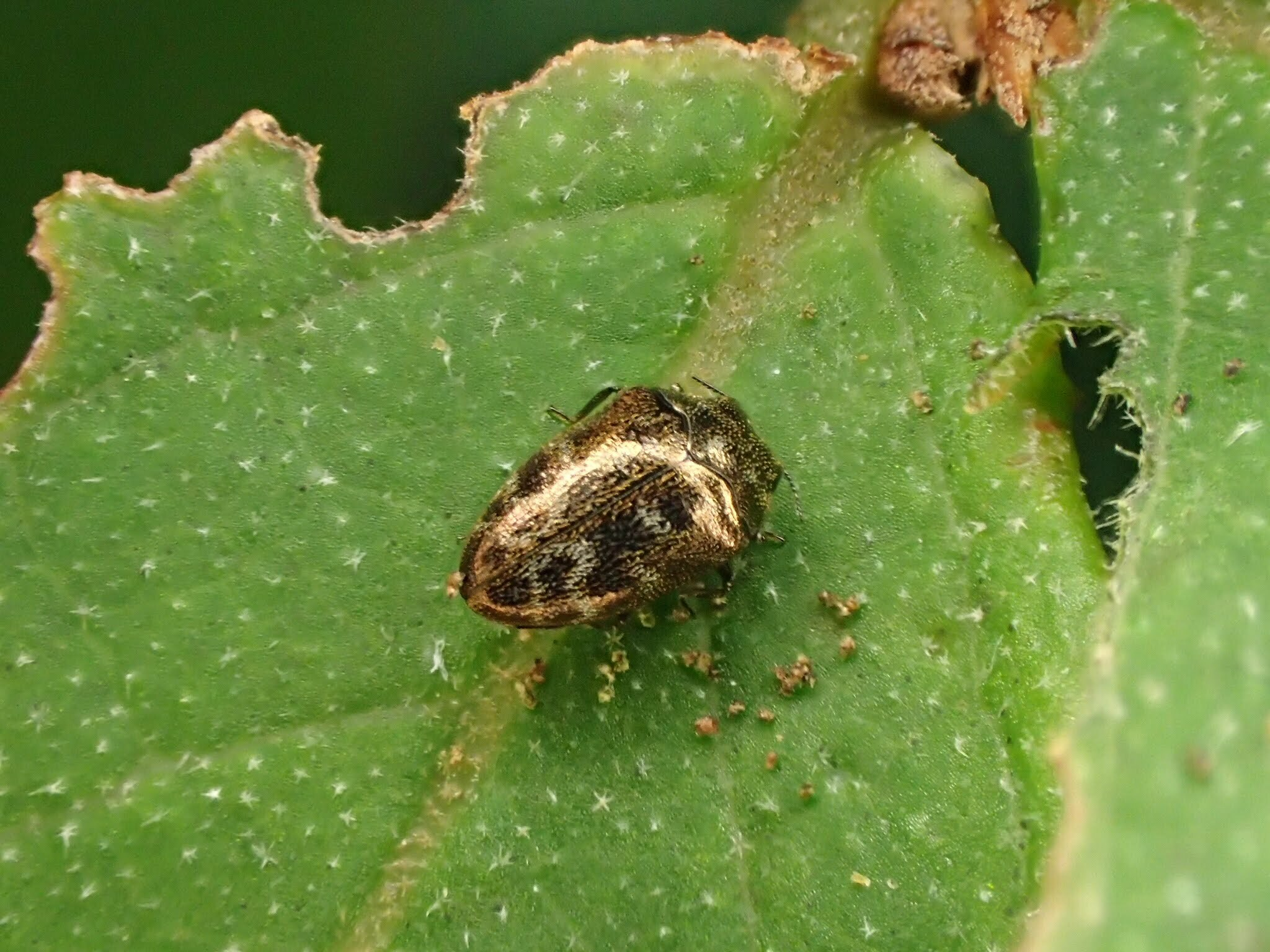
Trachys tsushimae, Japan

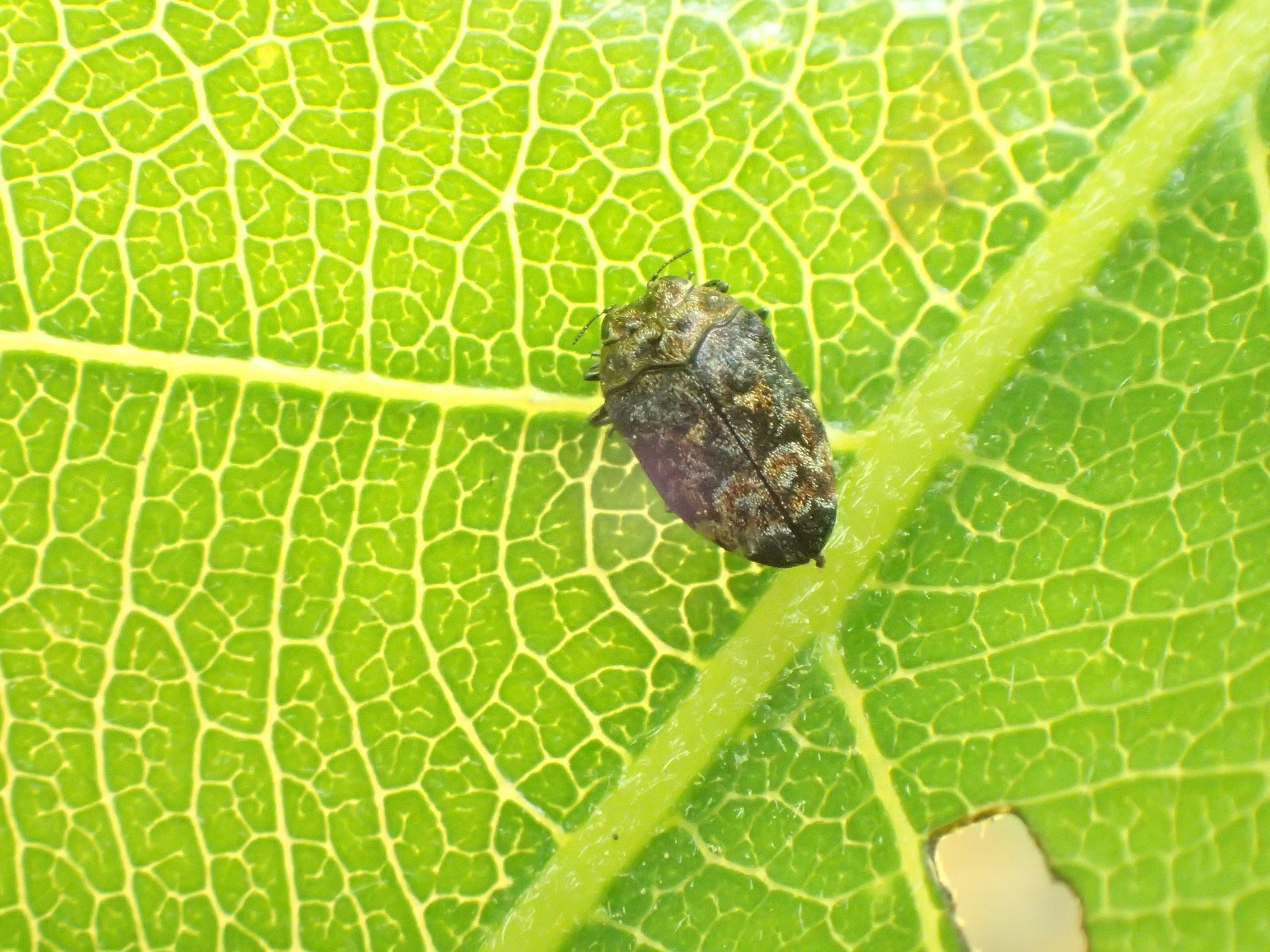
Trachys variolaris, Japan

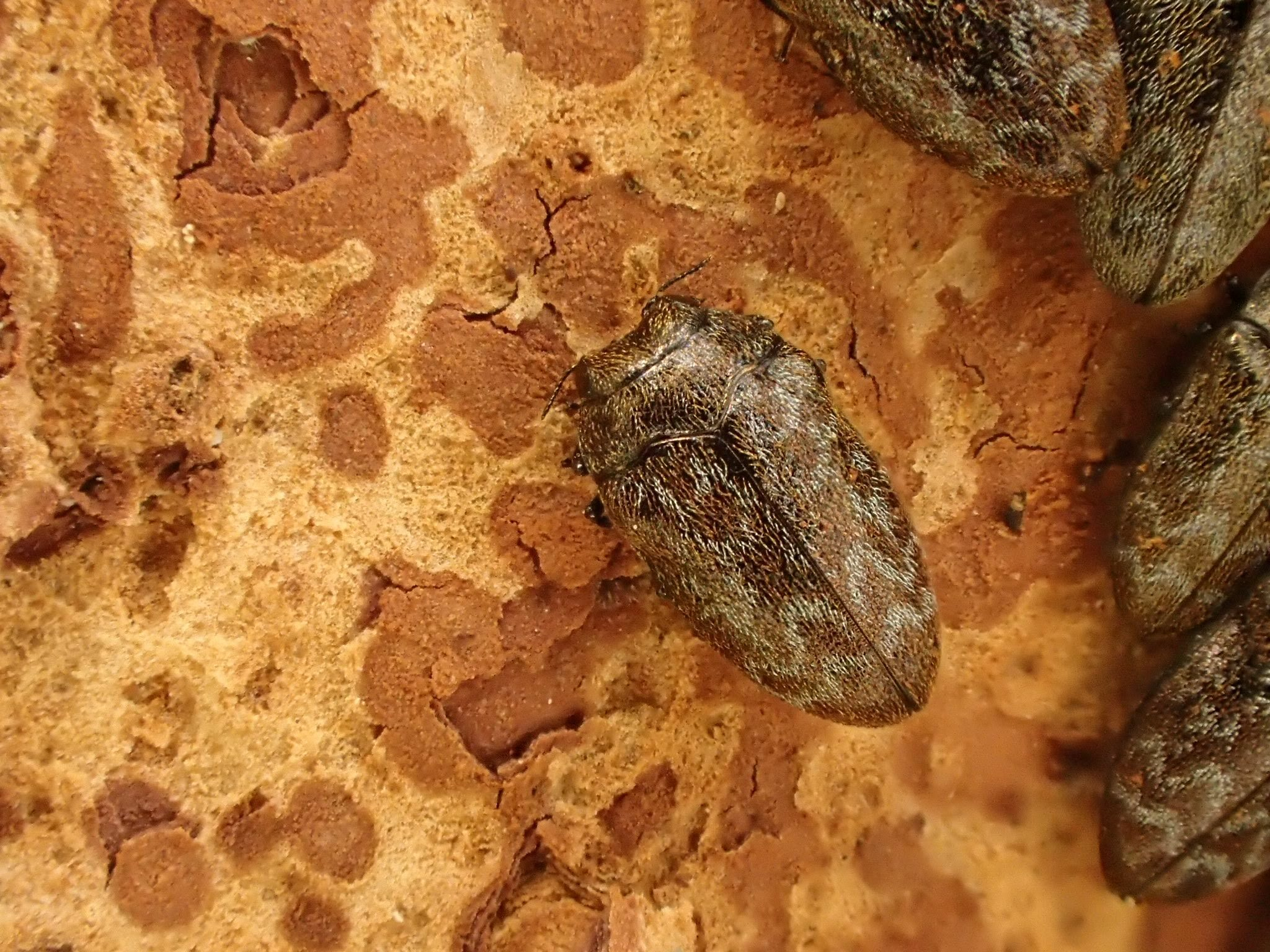
Trachys yanoi, Japan

== Species ==
- Trachys abeillei Obenberger, 1940
- Trachys abietis Kerremans, 1903
- Trachys abyssinicus Théry, 1927
- Trachys acaliphae Théry, 1947
- Trachys aeneiceps Obenberger, 1929
- Trachys aeneocephalus Fisher, 1930
- Trachys aenescens Kerremans, 1892
- Trachys aequalipennis Obenberger, 1921
- Trachys aequalis Kerremans, 1900
- Trachys africanus Kerremans, 1903
- Trachys agatha Obenberger, 1937
- Trachys agitosus Obenberger, 1937
- Trachys ahenatus Mulsant & Rey, 1863
- Trachys alberti Kerremans, 1912
- Trachys albolineatus Kerremans, 1912
- Trachys allectus Kerremans, 1914
- Trachys alluaudi Kerremans, 1894
- Trachys alongensis Descarpentries & Villiers, 1965
- Trachys alpinus Obenberger, 1918
- Trachys althaeus Obenberger, 1929
- Trachys althasius Obenberger, 1937
- Trachys alticolus Cobos, 1966
- Trachys ambiguus Descarpentries & Villiers, 1965
- Trachys ambrosus Kerremans, 1894
- Trachys amiartus Obenberger, 1938
- Trachys amplus Roubal, 1920
- Trachys andrewesi Kerremans, 1893
- Trachys andromedus Obenberger, 1929
- Trachys angolensis Théry, 1947
- Trachys anthraorus Obenberger, 1937
- Trachys anthrenoides Thomson, 1879
- Trachys antistes Obenberger, 1937
- Trachys aone Obenberger, 1929
- Trachys apicalis van de Poll, 1887
- Trachys apollonius Obenberger, 1929
- Trachys araxicolus Obenberger, 1918
- Trachys areroensis Obenberger, 1940
- Trachys argenteosparsus Théry, 1898
- Trachys argentipilis Obenberger, 1930
- Trachys argyronetus Obenberger, 1930
- Trachys arhemus Obenberger, 1929
- Trachys ariaxis Obenberger, 1937
- Trachys aristaeus Obenberger, 1929
- Trachys aristomache Obenberger, 1929
- Trachys armaeone Obenberger, 1937
- Trachys armillus Obenberger, 1937
- Trachys artaoxus Obenberger, 1937
- Trachys arxus Obenberger, 1937
- Trachys asiaticus Kerremans, 1900
- Trachys assinicus Kerremans, 1903
- Trachys astarte Obenberger, 1929
- Trachys asterius Obenberger, 1929
- Trachys atra Kerremans, 1893
- Trachys auricollis Saunders, 1873
- Trachys auriferus Cobos, 1959
- Trachys aurifluus Solsky, 1875
- Trachys auropictus Kerremans, 1912
- Trachys azureus Deyrolle, 1864
- Trachys bacchus Obenberger, 1929
- Trachys bakeri Kerremans, 1914
- Trachys bali Guérin-Méneville, 1840
- Trachys barbatulus Obenberger, 1937
- Trachys barbieri Descarpentries & Villiers, 1966
- Trachys barnevillei Tournier, 1868
- Trachys bathyllus Obenberger, 1929
- Trachys batoerradinis Fisher, 1935
- Trachys baudoni Descarpentries & Villiers, 1966
- Trachys baumiellus Obenberger, 1937
- Trachys bedfordi Théry, 1929
- Trachys bellicosus Théry, 1904
- Trachys bellonus Obenberger, 1929
- Trachys bellus Kerremans, 1894
- Trachys bequaerti Kerremans, 1912
- Trachys bettotanus Fisher, 1930
- Trachys bicolor Kerremans, 1890
- Trachys bicoloritarsis Descarpentries & Villiers, 1966
- Trachys binhensis Descarpentries & Villiers, 1965
- Trachys blackburni Kerremans, 1896
- Trachys blairi Obenberger, 1929
- Trachys blaisei Obenberger, 1921
- Trachys blandulus Obenberger, 1937
- Trachys blaoensis Descarpentries & Villiers, 1966
- Trachys bodenheimeri Théry, 1934
- Trachys boerus Obenberger, 1937
- Trachys boettcheri Obenberger, 1924
- Trachys bolivari Obenberger, 1921
- Trachys borneensis Kerremans, 1900
- Trachys bos Descarpentries & Villiers, 1966
- Trachys brasiliae Obenberger, 1924
- Trachys brevior Fairmaire, 1901
- Trachys brevis Théry, 1948
- Trachys brideliae Cobos, 1958
- Trachys bronzeus Cobos, 1959
- Trachys broussonetiae Kurosawa, 1985
- Trachys bruneianus Kerremans, 1900
- Trachys buffoni Descarpentries & Villiers, 1966
- Trachys calais Obenberger, 1929
- Trachys calopogoniae Théry, 1937
- Trachys cambouei Théry, 1905
- Trachys canescens Cobos, 1959
- Trachys capeneri Cobos, 1952
- Trachys capicolus Obenberger, 1937
- Trachys carbonarius Deyrolle, 1864
- Trachys carmentis Obenberger, 1929
- Trachys carus Kerremans, 1914
- Trachys cassiae Obenberger, 1937
- Trachys ceballosi Cobos, 1959
- Trachys centrimaculatus Théry, 1904
- Trachys ceylonicus Obenberger, 1916
- Trachys chembanus Théry, 1934
- Trachys chinensis Kerremans, 1898
- Trachys cicutus Obenberger, 1930
- Trachys cinctus Kerremans, 1900
- Trachys cinereoirroratus Motschulsky, 1861
- Trachys circumdatus Kerremans, 1908
- Trachys clathriferus Obenberger, 1937
- Trachys cleopatra Obenberger, 1930
- Trachys cochinchinae Descarpentries, 1958
- Trachys coelicolor Cobos, 1959
- Trachys collarti Théry, 1948
- Trachys commixtus Thomson, 1879
- Trachys compactus Théry, 1905
- Trachys confusissimus Obenberger, 1925
- Trachys confusulus Obenberger, 1928
- Trachys consimilis Kerremans, 1894
- Trachys contextus Obenberger, 1937
- Trachys coracinus Fåhraeus in Boheman, 1851
- Trachys corculus Théry, 1905
- Trachys corinnus Théry, 1905
- Trachys corporaali Obenberger, 1924
- Trachys coryphaeus Obenberger, 1937
- Trachys crassatus Obenberger, 1937
- Trachys crassulus Fairmaire, 1903
- Trachys credulus Kerremans, 1914
- Trachys creon Théry, 1905
- Trachys csikii Pochon, 1965
- Trachys cuneatus Fairmaire, 1903
- Trachys cuneiferus Kurosawa, 1959
- Trachys cupricolor Saunders, 1873
- Trachys cupripygus Deyrolle, 1864
- Trachys curius Obenberger, 1929
- Trachys cuvieri Descarpentries & Villiers, 1966
- Trachys cyaneus Théry, 1948
- Trachys cyanipennis Fisher, 1921
- Trachys cyanurus Kerremans, 1900
- Trachys cybele Obenberger, 1929
- Trachys cythaeris Obenberger, 1937
- Trachys dabalthus Obenberger, 1937
- Trachys dabraxus Obenberger, 1937
- Trachys daghmus Obenberger, 1937
- Trachys dalaraeus Obenberger, 1937
- Trachys damarigenus Obenberger, 1937
- Trachys danae Obenberger, 1929
- Trachys daoensis Descarpentries & Villiers, 1965
- Trachys daphnaeus Obenberger, 1937
- Trachys dapitanus Obenberger, 1924
- Trachys darlingtoni Théry, 1937
- Trachys darnothus Obenberger, 1937
- Trachys darwini Descarpentries & Villiers, 1966
- Trachys dasi Théry, 1947
- Trachys dasytrichus Obenberger, 1937
- Trachys davidis Fairmaire, 1888
- Trachys decorsei Théry, 1905
- Trachys deditus Théry, 1905
- Trachys dejectus Kerremans, 1900
- Trachys deliae Théry, 1905
- Trachys denti Théry, 1941
- Trachys denudatus Ritsema, 1879
- Trachys dessumi Descarpentries & Villiers, 1965
- Trachys deyrollei Fisher, 1926
- Trachys dichrous Obenberger, 1918
- Trachys dictynnus Obenberger, 1937
- Trachys dido Obenberger, 1930
- Trachys differens Kerremans, 1903
- Trachys dilaticeps Gebhardt, 1928
- Trachys dirus Théry, 1905
- Trachys discalis Kerremans, 1912
- Trachys divaricatus Cobos, 1952
- Trachys divergens Kerremans, 1893
- Trachys dives Théry, 1955
- Trachys dolabellus Obenberger, 1929
- Trachys dolomedeus Obenberger, 1937
- Trachys downingi Obenberger, 1929
- Trachys drescheri Fisher, 1935
- Trachys dubius Saunders, 1874
- Trachys dughbarus Obenberger, 1937
- Trachys dummeri Théry, 1928
- Trachys duplofasciatus Gebhardt, 1928
- Trachys duvivieri Kerremans, 1892
- Trachys earias Obenberger, 1937
- Trachys echo Obenberger, 1929
- Trachys eclogus Obenberger, 1937
- Trachys electrus Obenberger, 1929
- Trachys elegans Gestro, 1877
- Trachys elgus Obenberger, 1929
- Trachys eliminatus Obenberger, 1937
- Trachys elvira Obenberger, 1929
- Trachys epischius Obenberger, 1937
- Trachys erastrius Obenberger, 1937
- Trachys erogatus Obenberger, 1937
- Trachys erraticus Kerremans, 1903
- Trachys eruditsua Obenberger, 1937
- Trachys erythreae Obenberger, 1937
- Trachys eryx Obenberger, 1929
- Trachys escalerai Cobos, 1959
- Trachys eschscholtzi Obenberger, 1924
- Trachys eucyaneus Obenberger, 1937
- Trachys eurycephalus Obenberger, 1937
- Trachys eurynome Obenberger, 1929
- Trachys euterpe Obenberger, 1929
- Trachys evanescens Fåhraeus in Boheman, 1851
- Trachys excavatus Kerremans, 1893
- Trachys exilis Kerremans, 1894
- Trachys exmiaris Obenberger, 1937
- Trachys exsculptus Kerremans, 1894
- Trachys fairmairei Kerremans, 1903
- Trachys fallax Kerremans, 1893
- Trachys fasciunculus Saunders, 1866
- Trachys fenestrellus Obenberger, 1937
- Trachys fidens Kerremans, 1903
- Trachys fischeri Théry, 1905
- Trachys fisheri Obenberger, 1924
- Trachys flaviceps Kerremans, 1892
- Trachys flavius Obenberger, 1929
- Trachys fleutiauxi van de Poll, 1892
- Trachys fluviatilis Kerremans, 1896
- Trachys foliivorus Obenberger, 1937
- Trachys formosanus Kerremans, 1912
- Trachys fragariae Brisout de Barneville, 1874
- Trachys francisci Descarpentries & Villiers, 1966
- Trachys furius Obenberger, 1929
- Trachys furnius Obenberger, 1930
- Trachys gabbalus Obenberger, 1937
- Trachys gambianus Obenberger, 1937
- Trachys gapi Obenberger, 1929
- Trachys garuus Obenberger, 1937
- Trachys gasurrus Obenberger, 1937
- Trachys gedyei Théry, 1941
- Trachys gerardi Obenberger, 1937
- Trachys gestroanus Obenberger, 1924
- Trachys gilli Obenberger, 1937
- Trachys giubbanus Obenberger, 1937
- Trachys globosus Kerremans, 1896
- Trachys goberti Gozis, 1889
- Trachys grandiceps Théry, 1905
- Trachys grandidieri Théry, 1937
- Trachys gravidus Kerremans, 1900
- Trachys griseofasciatus Saunders, 1873
- Trachys habrolomoides Descarpentries & Villiers, 1966
- Trachys harmandi Descarpentries & Villiers, 1965
- Trachys helena Obenberger, 1929
- Trachys helferi Obenberger, 1918
- Trachys helferianus Cobos, 1957
- Trachys heliochaerus Obenberger, 1937
- Trachys heliomachus Obenberger, 1929
- Trachys hera Obenberger, 1929
- Trachys herillus Obenberger, 1929
- Trachys hermione Obenberger, 1929
- Trachys hessei Obenberger, 1937
- Trachys hipponensis Marseul, 1866
- Trachys hoaensis Descarpentries & Villiers, 1966
- Trachys horni Théry, 1904
- Trachys hornianus Obenberger, 1918
- Trachys horvathi Pochon, 1965
- Trachys houskai Obenberger, 1946
- Trachys hylophilus Obenberger, 1937
- Trachys hypsipile Obenberger, 1929
- Trachys hyrcaeus Obenberger, 1929
- Trachys ida Obenberger, 1929
- Trachys immotus Théry, 1905
- Trachys imperatrix Kerremans, 1894
- Trachys impressus Boheman, 1858
- Trachys incertus Fåhraeus in Boheman, 1851
- Trachys inconspicuus Saunders, 1873
- Trachys indrus Obenberger, 1929
- Trachys ine Obenberger, 1918
- Trachys ineditus Saunders, 1873
- Trachys insulicolus Fisher, 1935
- Trachys ioccosulus Obenberger, 1937
- Trachys iphitheus Obenberger, 1937
- Trachys ipomeaeus Théry, 1930
- Trachys isabellae Obenberger, 1921
- Trachys isis Obenberger, 1937
- Trachys isolatus Obenberger, 1924
- Trachys jacobi Théry, 1927
- Trachys jakobsoni Obenberger, 1929
- Trachys janthe Obenberger, 1929
- Trachys jeanneli Kerremans, 1914
- Trachys jeannelianus Descarpentries & Villiers, 1966
- Trachys jo Obenberger, 1918
- Trachys judith Obenberger, 1929
- Trachys juno Obenberger, 1918
- Trachys junodella Théry, 1938
- Trachys junodi Obenberger, 1937
- Trachys juvenilis Kerremans, 1903
- Trachys kalshoveni Fisher, 1935
- Trachys kaszabi Pochon, 1965
- Trachys kikuyinus Obenberger, 1928
- Trachys kittenbergeri Pochon, 1965
- Trachys kivuensis Théry, 1948
- Trachys klapaleki Obenberger, 1930
- Trachys kocheri Baudon, 1958
- Trachys koenigi Reitter, 1890
- Trachys koshunensis Obenberger, 1940
- Trachys kraatzi Kerremans, 1899
- Trachys krakatoanus Obenberger, 1929
- Trachys kurosawai Bellamy, 2004
- Trachys lacthoensis Descarpentries & Villiers, 1966
- Trachys lagalus Cobos, 1963
- Trachys lakshmi Obenberger, 1937
- Trachys lamarcki Descarpentries & Villiers, 1966
- Trachys lameerei Kerremans, 1912
- Trachys lao Descarpentries & Villiers, 1966
- Trachys laoticus Baudon, 1962
- Trachys latifrons Kerremans, 1907
- Trachys latreillei Descarpentries & Villiers, 1966
- Trachys laurencii Obenberger, 1937
- Trachys lavinius Obenberger, 1937
- Trachys layus Obenberger, 1952
- Trachys lembanus Kerremans, 1912
- Trachys lenus Obenberger, 1937
- Trachys lesnei Théry, 1934
- Trachys leucippe Obenberger, 1930
- Trachys leuctrius Obenberger, 1937
- Trachys levipennis Kerremans, 1903
- Trachys libanonicus Obenberger, 1937
- Trachys libitinus Obenberger, 1930
- Trachys lichtensteini Buysson, 1918
- Trachys lithus Obenberger, 1937
- Trachys livius Obenberger, 1937
- Trachys lucia Obenberger, 1937
- Trachys lucidulus Fåhraeus in Boheman, 1851
- Trachys lunatus Fisher, 1921
- Trachys luxuriosus Obenberger, 1937
- Trachys luzonicus Kerremans, 1900
- Trachys lyrus Kerremans, 1892
- Trachys macrocephalus Cobos, 1957
- Trachys maculatus Kerremans, 1894
- Trachys madurensis Obenberger, 1921
- Trachys magnificus Kerremans, 1894
- Trachys maia Obenberger, 1929
- Trachys malignus Obenberger, 1937
- Trachys mandarinus Obenberger, 1917
- Trachys manilius Obenberger, 1930
- Trachys mansueta Kerremans, 1894
- Trachys mariaxis Obenberger, 1937
- Trachys marineanus Obenberger, 1930
- Trachys marmoratus Fisher, 1921
- Trachys marogis Obenberger, 1937
- Trachys marshalli Théry, 1931
- Trachys mateui Cobos, 1954
- Trachys mathaba Bellamy, 1998
- Trachys matronus Obenberger, 1937
- Trachys maxaphus Obenberger, 1937
- Trachys medianus Fairmaire, 1903
- Trachys megacephalus Descarpentries & Villiers, 1965
- Trachys melliculus Deyrolle, 1864
- Trachys mendicus Deyrolle, 1864
- Trachys menthae Bedel, 1921
- Trachys meo Descarpentries & Villiers, 1966
- Trachys meridianus Obenberger, 1937
- Trachys miargus Obenberger, 1937
- Trachys micans Obenberger, 1937
- Trachys micros Fairmaire, 1901
- Trachys minimus (Wiedemann, 1823)
- Trachys minor Théry, 1947
- Trachys minutus (Linnaeus, 1758)
- Trachys misanthrus Obenberger, 1937
- Trachys mixiorus Obenberger, 1937
- Trachys mixtipilis Obenberger, 1929
- Trachys moi Descarpentries & Villiers, 1965
- Trachys montanus Kerremans, 1908
- Trachys moralesi Cobos, 1959
- Trachys morenoi Cobos, 1958
- Trachys mouhoti Descarpentries & Villiers, 1966
- Trachys moultoni Kerremans, 1912
- Trachys muelleri Obenberger, 1940
- Trachys mundamus Obenberger, 1937
- Trachys muong Descarpentries & Villiers, 1966
- Trachys mystaxidorus Obenberger, 1937
- Trachys nairobiensis Théry, 1941
- Trachys namensis Descarpentries & Villiers, 1965
- Trachys namithrus Obenberger, 1937
- Trachys nanubis Obenberger, 1937
- Trachys natalesianus Cobos, 1952
- Trachys natalicus Obenberger, 1937
- Trachys nathani Cobos, 1957
- Trachys nauticus Obenberger, 1937
- Trachys nemethi Théry, 1928
- Trachys ngongensis Théry, 1941
- Trachys nickerli Obenberger, 1924
- Trachys nigerellus Obenberger, 1935
- Trachys niobae Théry, 1905
- Trachys nitidus Kerremans, 1893
- Trachys noarche Obenberger, 1930
- Trachys nodulipennis Obenberger, 1940
- Trachys nomas Obenberger, 1937
- Trachys novellus Obenberger, 1937
- Trachys novicius Obenberger, 1937
- Trachys novus Kerremans, 1894
- Trachys nudus Abeille de Perrin, 1893
- Trachys obesulus Obenberger, 1918
- Trachys obesus Kerremans, 1900
- Trachys obliquus Kerremans, 1892
- Trachys obscurus Kerremans, 1896
- Trachys occisus Kerremans, 1903
- Trachys ocellipunctatus Fisher, 1926
- Trachys ohbayashii Kurosawa, 1954
- Trachys olifantinus Obenberger, 1939
- Trachys olmyrus Obenberger, 1929
- Trachys olyrus Obenberger, 1929
- Trachys oncoxius Obenberger, 1929
- Trachys opulentus Abeille de Perrin, 1893
- Trachys orcas Obenberger, 1930
- Trachys orientalis Thomson, 1879
- Trachys ovatus Fisher, 1921
- Trachys ovis Kerremans, 1908
- Trachys pacificus Kerremans, 1894
- Trachys paklayanus Descarpentries & Villiers, 1966
- Trachys paphne Obenberger, 1937
- Trachys parallelus Kerremans, 1898
- Trachys parvulus Kerremans, 1893
- Trachys patrizianus Théry, 1927
- Trachys patronus Obenberger, 1937
- Trachys pecirkai Obenberger, 1926
- Trachys penarius Obenberger, 1937
- Trachys pendleburyi Fisher, 1930
- Trachys penicillatus Kerremans, 1892
- Trachys percautus Kerremans, 1903
- Trachys perparvus Obenberger, 1918
- Trachys perrieri Fairmaire, 1901
- Trachys perroti Descarpentries & Villiers, 1965
- Trachys perrotianus Descarpentries & Villiers, 1965
- Trachys pertoldi Obenberger, 1929
- Trachys phaedaenus Obenberger, 1937
- Trachys phanerogaea Obenberger, 1937
- Trachys pharameis Obenberger, 1937
- Trachys pharaxis Obenberger, 1937
- Trachys philomelus Obenberger, 1937
- Trachys phlyctaenoides Kolenati, 1846
- Trachys phoebe Obenberger, 1930
- Trachys piceiventris Fisher, 1921
- Trachys pictus Fisher, 1921
- Trachys pilosulus Kerremans, 1893
- Trachys pipturi Fisher, 1937
- Trachys plausibilis Obenberger, 1937
- Trachys plebejus Kerremans, 1894
- Trachys pollentius Obenberger, 1929
- Trachys polyhymnius Obenberger, 1929
- Trachys polyxenus Obenberger, 1937
- Trachys pomonus Obenberger, 1937
- Trachys popilius Obenberger, 1929
- Trachys porcius Obenberger, 1937
- Trachys posticalis Fairmaire, 1903
- Trachys praocris Obenberger, 1937
- Trachys princeps Saunders, 1874
- Trachys proagorus Obenberger, 1937
- Trachys problematicus Obenberger, 1918
- Trachys procris Obenberger, 1937
- Trachys proculeius Obenberger, 1937
- Trachys proflatus Obenberger, 1937
- Trachys prolongatulus Obenberger, 1937
- Trachys proserpinus Obenberger, 1929
- Trachys psecas Obenberger, 1937
- Trachys pseuderato Descarpentries & Villiers, 1966
- Trachys pseudolyrus Descarpentries & Villiers, 1965
- Trachys pseudoscrobiculatus Obenberger, 1940
- Trachys puberulus Fåhraeus in Boheman, 1851
- Trachys pulex Obenberger, 1937
- Trachys pullus Obenberger, 1937
- Trachys pumilus (Illiger, 1803)
- Trachys puncticollis Abeille de Perrin, 1900
- Trachys purpuridorsis Obenberger, 1937
- Trachys pyrameis Obenberger, 1937
- Trachys quercicolus Marseul, 1871
- Trachys racilius Obenberger, 1937
- Trachys ramisinus Obenberger, 1928
- Trachys reflexus Gené, 1839
- Trachys regius Kerremans, 1914
- Trachys regularis Cobos, 1959
- Trachys reitteri Obenberger, 1930
- Trachys resupinans Obenberger, 1937
- Trachys rhexinius Obenberger, 1937
- Trachys riparius Kerremans, 1913
- Trachys rita Obenberger, 1937
- Trachys rivularis Obenberger, 1937
- Trachys robustus Saunders, 1873
- Trachys rotundatus Kerremans, 1893
- Trachys rufescens Kerremans, 1892
- Trachys rufopubens Fairmaire, 1888
- Trachys ruralis Obenberger, 1937
- Trachys rwindiensis Théry, 1948
- Trachys sabirrus Obenberger, 1937
- Trachys sagus Obenberger, 1937
- Trachys saigonensis Descarpentries, 1958
- Trachys sakaliani Bellamy, 2004
- Trachys salpius Obenberger, 1937
- Trachys saltzi Bellamy, 1999
- Trachys salvazai Descarpentries & Villiers, 1966
- Trachys sanguinipilis Descarpentries & Villiers, 1966
- Trachys satanas Descarpentries & Villiers, 1965
- Trachys saundersi Lewis, 1893
- Trachys schoutedeni Kerremans, 1912
- Trachys schultzei Kerremans, 1907
- Trachys scriptellus Obenberger, 1924
- Trachys scrobiculatus Kiesenwetter, 1857
- Trachys scyrrhaeus Obenberger, 1937
- Trachys sebakwensis Obenberger, 1937
- Trachys segundus Bellamy, 1996
- Trachys sellatus Fairmaire, 1901
- Trachys semen Théry, 1937
- Trachys semiramis Obenberger, 1929
- Trachys sempronius Obenberger, 1937
- Trachys senegalensis Gory, 1841
- Trachys serapis Obenberger, 1929
- Trachys sibitiensis Descarpentries, 1970
- Trachys sibylla Obenberger, 1937
- Trachys sicardi Théry, 1905
- Trachys signatus Kerremans, 1896
- Trachys silius Obenberger, 1929
- Trachys simbus Obenberger, 1937
- Trachys simoni Kerremans, 1903
- Trachys simulans Kerremans, 1893
- Trachys sinicus Obenberger, 1929
- Trachys sjoestedti Kerremans, 1908
- Trachys solarius Obenberger, 1937
- Trachys solitarius Kerremans, 1894
- Trachys solivagus Obenberger, 1937
- Trachys somalus Gestro, 1895
- Trachys sordidulus Obenberger, 1918
- Trachys sororculus Obenberger, 1929
- Trachys sparsutus Kerremans, 1900
- Trachys spectatrix Obenberger, 1937
- Trachys spectrus Théry, 1905
- Trachys sphaxus Obenberger, 1937
- Trachys splendidulus Reitter, 1890
- Trachys staudingeri Théry, 1932
- Trachys sternax Obenberger, 1937
- Trachys straeleni Théry, 1948
- Trachys stricticollis Descarpentries & Villiers, 1965
- Trachys suarezi Cobos, 1958
- Trachys subaeneellus Obenberger, 1924
- Trachys subcorpulentus Descarpentries & Villiers, 1965
- Trachys subglabrus Rey, 1891
- Trachys subviolaceus Kerremans, 1892
- Trachys sumbawanus Kerremans, 1898
- Trachys suspectatrix Obenberger, 1918
- Trachys sussamyrensis Obenberger, 1937
- Trachys swiertsrae Obenberger, 1937
- Trachys tagalus Cobos, 1963
- Trachys taiwanensis Obenberger, 1929
- Trachys tamensis Descarpentries & Villiers, 1966
- Trachys tavetanus Kerremans, 1913
- Trachys taxillus Obenberger, 1937
- Trachys tenuis Obenberger, 1937
- Trachys thais Obenberger, 1929
- Trachys theochaerus Obenberger, 1937
- Trachys thoracicus Kerremans, 1912
- Trachys tiburtius Obenberger, 1937
- Trachys timidus Fåhraeus in Boheman, 1851
- Trachys tiwianus Obenberger, 1928
- Trachys tokyoensis Obenberger, 1940
- Trachys tonkineus Obenberger, 1921
- Trachys toringoi Kurosawa, 1951
- Trachys torridus Thomson, 1879
- Trachys transversus Kerremans, 1892
- Trachys tristiculus Obenberger, 1918
- Trachys tristis Abeille de Perrin, 1900
- Trachys troglodytes Gyllenhal in Schönherr, 1817
- Trachys troglodytiformis Obenberger, 1918
- Trachys tschoffeni Kerremans, 1896
- Trachys tsushimae Obenberger, 1922
- Trachys turanicus Semenov, 1893
- Trachys ugandicus Obenberger, 1937
- Trachys ukerewensis Obenberger, 1937
- Trachys umbrosus Kerremans, 1894
- Trachys undulatus Deyrolle, 1864
- Trachys usambarae Obenberger, 1937
- Trachys valverdei Cobos, 1958
- Trachys vandenplasi Obenberger, 1937
- Trachys vanrooni Obenberger, 1930
- Trachys varii Cobos, 1958
- Trachys variolaris Saunders, 1873
- Trachys variolipennis Cobos, 1963
- Trachys varius Deyrolle, 1864
- Trachys vaulogeri Abeille de Perrin, 1900
- Trachys vavrai Obenberger, 1918
- Trachys ventricosus Deyrolle, 1864
- Trachys vermiculatus Kerremans, 1900
- Trachys vernus Kerremans, 1900
- Trachys vicarians Obenberger, 1918
- Trachys vientianensis Descarpentries & Villiers, 1966
- Trachys villiersi Descarpentries, 1952
- Trachys violae Kurosawa, 1959
- Trachys virescens Kerremans, 1892
- Trachys viridis Samouelle, 1819
- Trachys viridulus Kerremans, 1892
- Trachys welwitschi Théry, 1947
- Trachys wittei Théry, 1948
- Trachys xampethis Obenberger, 1937
- Trachys xanthe Obenberger, 1937
- Trachys xauarius Obenberger, 1937
- Trachys xenarthrus Obenberger, 1937
- Trachys xenius Obenberger, 1929
- Trachys xenonymus Obenberger, 1937
- Trachys xiengensis Descarpentries & Villiers, 1966
- Trachys xithris Obenberger, 1937
- Trachys yanoi Kurosawa, 1959
- Trachys yoshidai Kurosawa, 1959
- Trachys zaghrus Obenberger, 1937
- Trachys zambesicus Obenberger, 1937
- Trachys zanzibaricus Kerremans, 1896
- Trachys zaroghus Obenberger, 1937
- Trachys zavattarii Obenberger, 1940
- Trachys zebrinus Deyrolle, 1864
- Trachys zethmaeus Obenberger, 1937
- Trachys ziziphusii Cobos, 1958
- Trachys zuluanus Obenberger, 1937
- Trachys zulukaffra Obenberger, 1937
