= List of dicotyledons of Great Britain and Ireland =

This page covers a group of dicotyledon families (Lauraceae to Salicaceae). For the background to this list see parent article List of the vascular plants of Britain and Ireland.

Status key: * indicates an introduced species and e indicates an extinct species.

This division of the eudicots is shown in the following cladogram:

- eudicots
  - basal eudicots
    (paraphyletic group: Buxales, Proteales, Ranunculales, Trochodendrales)
  - core eudicots
    - Gunnerales
    - Pentapetalae
      - Dilleniales
      - - superrosids
          - Saxifragales
          - rosids
            - Vitales
            - eurosids
              - fabids
              - malvids
        - superasterids
          - Santalales
          - - Berberidopsidales
            - - Caryophyllales
              - asterids
                - Cornales
                - - Ericales
                  - euasterids
                    - campanulids
                    - lamiids

== Order Ceratophyllales ==
=== Family Ceratophyllaceae (coontails, hornworts) ===
English name	Scientific name	Status
Rigid hornwort	Ceratophyllum demersum	
Soft hornwort	Ceratophyllum submersum	

== Order Ranunculales ==
=== Family Ranunculaceae (buttercup family) ===
English name	Scientific name	Status
Marsh-marigold	Caltha palustris	
Globeflower	Trollius europaeus	
Stinking hellebore	Helleborus foetidus	
Green hellebore	Helleborus viridis	
Lenten-rose	Helleborus orientalis	*
Winter aconite	Eranthis hyemalis	*
Love-in-a-mist	Nigella damascena	*
Monk's-hood	Aconitum napellus	
Wolf's-bane	Aconitum lycoctonum	*
Larkspur	Consolida ajacis	*
Baneberry	Actaea spicata	
Wood anemone	Anemone nemorosa	
Blue anemone	Anemone apennina	*
Yellow anemone	Anemone ranunculoides	*
Liverleaf	Anemone hepatica	*
Pasqueflower	Pulsatilla vulgaris	
Traveller's joy	Clematis vitalba	
Virgin's-bower	Clematis flammula	*
Orange-peel clematis	Clematis tangutica	*
Himalayan clematis	Clematis montana	*
Purple clematis	Clematis viticella	*
Meadow buttercup	Ranunculus acris	
Creeping buttercup	Ranunculus repens	
Bulbous buttercup	Ranunculus bulbosus	
Hairy buttercup	Ranunculus sardous	
St Martin's buttercup	Ranunculus marginatus	*
Rough-fruited buttercup	Ranunculus muricatus	*
Small-flowered buttercup	Ranunculus parviflorus	
Corn buttercup	Ranunculus arvensis	
Jersey buttercup	Ranunculus paludosus	
Goldilocks buttercup	Ranunculus auricomus	
Celery-leaved buttercup	Ranunculus sceleratus	
Greater spearwort	Ranunculus lingua	
Lesser spearwort	Ranunculus flammula	
Creeping spearwort	Ranunculus reptans	
Adder's-tongue spearwort	Ranunculus ophioglossifolius	
Aconite-leaved buttercup	Ranunculus aconitifolius	*
Lesser celandine	Ranunculus ficaria	
Ivy-leaved crowfoot	Ranunculus hederaceus	
Round-leaved crowfoot	Ranunculus omiophyllus	
Three-lobed crowfoot	Ranunculus tripartitus	
Brackish water-crowfoot	Ranunculus baudotii	
Thread-leaved water-crowfoot	Ranunculus trichophyllus	
Common water-crowfoot	Ranunculus aquatilis	
Pond water-crowfoot	Ranunculus peltatus	
Stream water-crowfoot	Ranunculus penicillatus	
River water-crowfoot	Ranunculus fluitans	
Fan-leaved water-crowfoot	Ranunculus circinatus	
Pheasant's-eye	Adonis annua	*
Mousetail	Myosurus minimus	
Columbine	Aquilegia vulgaris	
Pyrenean columbine	Aquilegia pyrenaica	*
French meadow-rue	Thalictrum aquilegiifolium	*
Chinese meadow-rue	Thalictrum delavayi	*
Common meadow-rue	Thalictrum flavum	
Lesser meadow-rue	Thalictrum minus	
Alpine meadow-rue	Thalictrum alpinum	

== Order Gunnerales ==
=== Family Gunneraceae ===
English name	Scientific name	Status
Giant-rhubarb	Gunnera tinctoria	*

== Basal angiosperms ==
=== Order Nymphaeales ===
==== Family Nymphaeaceae (waterlilies) ====
English name	Scientific name	Status
White water-lily	Nymphaea alba	
Yellow water-lily	Nuphar lutea	
Least water-lily	Nuphar pumila	
Spatter-dock	Nuphar advena	*

== Magnoliids ==
=== Order Laurales ===
==== Family Lauraceae (laurel family) ====
English name	Scientific name	Status
Bay laurel	Laurus nobilis	*

=== Order Piperales ===
==== Family Aristolochiaceae (birthwort family) ====
English name	Scientific name	Status
Asarabacca	Asarum europaeum	*
Birthwort	Aristolochia clematitis	*
Smearwort	Aristolochia rotunda	*

== Superasterids ==
=== Order Caryophyllales ===
==== Family Aizoaceae (ice plants, carpet weeds) ====
English name	Scientific name	Status
Indian pokeweed	Phytolacca acinosa	*
Heart-leaf ice-plant	Aptenia cordifolia	*
Shrubby dewplant	Ruschia caroli	*
Sickle-leaved dewplant	Lampranthus falciformis	*
Rosy dewplant	Lampranthus multiradiatus (syn. L. roseus)	*
Deltoid-leaved dewplant	Oscularia deltoides	*
Purple dewplant	Disphyma crassifolium	*
Pale dewplant	Drosanthemum floribundum	*
Lesser sea-fig	Erepsia heteropetala	*
Sally-my-handsome	Carpobrotus acinaciformis	*
Hottentot-fig	Carpobrotus edulis	*
Angular sea-fig	Carpobrotus glaucescens	*

=== Order Santalales ===
==== Family Santalaceae (sandalwoods) ====
English name	Scientific name	Status
Mistletoe	Viscum album	

=== Asterids ===
==== Order Cornales ====
===== Family Hydrangeaceae (hydrangea family) =====
English name	Scientific name	Status
Mock-orange	Philadelphus coronarius	*

==== Order Escalloniales ====
===== Family Escalloniaceae (Escallonia family) =====
English name	Scientific name	Status
Escallonia	Escallonia macrantha	*

==== Order Ericales ====
===== Family Balsaminaceae (balsam family) =====
English name	Scientific name	Status
Touch-me-not balsam	Impatiens noli-tangere	
Orange balsam	Impatiens capensis	*
Small balsam	Impatiens parviflora	*
Himalayan balsam	Impatiens glandulifera	*

==== Campanulids ====
===== Order Asterales =====
====== Family Menyanthaceae ======
English name	Scientific name	Status
Bogbean	Menyanthes trifoliata	
Fringed water-lily	Nymphoides peltata	

===== Order Apiales =====
====== Family Pittosporaceae ======
English name	Scientific name	Status
Karo	Pittosporum crassifolium	*
Kohuhu	Pittosporum tenuifolium	*

====== Family Araliaceae (ginseng family) ======
English name	Scientific name	Status
Persian ivy	Hedera colchica	*
Ivy	Hedera helix	
Chinese angelica-tree	Aralia chinensis	*
Japanese angelica-tree	Aralia elata	*
American-spikenard	Aralia racemosa	*
Marsh pennywort	Hydrocotyle vulgaris	
Hairy pennywort	Hydrocotyle moschata	*
New Zealand pennywort	Hydrocotyle novae-zeelandiae	*

====== Family Apiaceae (celery, carrot or parsley family; umbellifers) ======
English name	Scientific name	Status
Sanicle	Sanicula europaea	
Astrantia	Astrantia major	*
Tall eryngo	Eryngium giganteum	*
Blue eryngo	Eryngium planum	*
Sea-holly	Eryngium maritimum	
Field eryngo	Eryngium campestre	
Hairy chervil	Chaerophyllum hirsutum	*
Golden chervil	Chaerophyllum aureum	*
Rough chervil	Chaerophyllum temulum	
Cow parsley	Anthriscus sylvestris	
Bur chervil	Anthriscus caucalis	
Shepherd's-needle	Scandix pecten-veneris	
Sweet cicely	Myrrhis odorata	*
Coriander	Coriandrum sativum	*
Alexanders	Smyrnium olusatrum	*
Perfoliate alexanders	Smyrnium perfoliatum	*
Great pignut	Bunium bulbocastanum	
Pignut	Conopodium majus	
Greater burnet-saxifrage	Pimpinella major	
Burnet-saxifrage	Pimpinella saxifraga	
Ground-elder	Aegopodium podagraria	*
Greater water-parsnip	Sium latifolium	
Lesser water-parsnip	Berula erecta	
Rock samphire	Crithmum maritimum	
Moon carrot	Seseli libanotis	
Tubular water-dropwort	Oenanthe fistulosa	
Narrow-leaved water-dropwort	Oenanthe silaifolia	
Corky-fruited water-dropwort	Oenanthe pimpinelloides	
Parsley water-dropwort	Oenanthe lachenalii	
Hemlock water-dropwort	Oenanthe crocata	
River water-dropwort	Oenanthe fluviatilis	
Fine-leaved water-dropwort	Oenanthe aquatica	
Fool's parsley	Aethusa cynapium	
Fennel	Foeniculum vulgare	*
Pepper-saxifrage	Silaum silaus	
Spignel	Meum athamanticum	
Bladderseed	Physospermum cornubiense	
Hemlock	Conium maculatum	
Shrubby hare's-ear	Bupleurum fruticosum	*
Sickle-leaved hare's-ear	Bupleurum falcatum	
Slender hare's-ear	Bupleurum tenuissimum	
Small hare's-ear	Bupleurum baldense	
False thorow-wax	Bupleurum subovatum	*
Honewort	Trinia glauca	
Wild celery	Apium graveolens	
Fool's water-cress	Apium nodiflorum	
Creeping marshwort	Apium repens	
Lesser marshwort	Apium inundatum	
Garden parsley	Petroselinum crispum	*
Corn parsley	Petroselinum segetum	
Stone parsley	Sison amomum	
Cowbane	Cicuta virosa	
Bullwort	Ammi majus	*
Longleaf	Falcaria vulgaris	*
Caraway	Carum carvi	*
Whorled caraway	Carum verticillatum	
Cambridge milk-parsley	Selinum carvifolia	
Scots lovage	Ligusticum scoticum	
Wild angelica	Angelica sylvestris	
Garden angelica	Angelica archangelica	*
Lovage	Levisticum officinale	*
Hog's fennel	Peucedanum officinale	
Milk-parsley	Peucedanum palustre	
Masterwort	Peucedanum ostruthium	*
Wild parsnip	Pastinaca sativa	
Hogweed	Heracleum sphondylium	
Giant hogweed	Heracleum mantegazzianum	*
Hartwort	Tordylium maximum	*
Upright hedge-parsley	Torilis japonica	
Spreading hedge-parsley	Torilis arvensis	
Knotted hedge-parsley	Torilis nodosa	
Wild carrot	Daucus carota	

====== Family Polemoniaceae (Jacob's-ladder or phlox family) ======
English name	Scientific name	Status
Jacob's-ladder	Polemonium caeruleum	

===== Order Aquifoliales =====
====== Family Aquifoliaceae (holly) ======
English name	Scientific name	Status
Holly	Ilex aquifolium	

===== Order Dipsacales =====
====== Family Adoxaceae (moschatel family) ======
English name	Scientific name	Status
Red-berried elder	Sambucus racemosa	*
Elder	Sambucus nigra	
American elder	Sambucus canadensis	*
Dwarf elder	Sambucus ebulus	
Guelder-rose	Viburnum opulus	
Wayfaring-tree	Viburnum lantana	
Laurustinus	Viburnum tinus	*
Wrinkled viburnum	Viburnum rhytidophyllum	*
Snowberry	Symphoricarpos albus	*
Twinflower	Linnaea borealis	
Himalayan honeysuckle	Leycesteria formosa	*
Box-leaved honeysuckle	Lonicera pileata	*
Wilson's honeysuckle	Lonicera nitida	*
Californian honeysuckle	Lonicera involucrata	*
Fly honeysuckle	Lonicera xylosteum	
Henry's honeysuckle	Lonicera henryi	*
Japanese honeysuckle	Lonicera japonica	*
Honeysuckle	Lonicera periclymenum	
Perfoliate honeysuckle	Lonicera caprifolium	*
Moschatel	Adoxa moschatellina	

====== Family Caprifoliaceae (honeysuckle family) ======
English name	Scientific name	Status
Common cornsalad	Valerianella locusta	
Keeled-fruited cornsalad	Valerianella carinata	
Broad-fruited cornsalad	Valerianella rimosa	
Narrow-fruited cornsalad	Valerianella dentata	
Hairy-fruited cornsalad	Valerianella eriocarpa	*
Common valerian	Valeriana officinalis	
Pyrenean valerian	Valeriana pyrenaica	*
Marsh valerian	Valeriana dioica	
Red valerian	Centranthus ruber	*
Annual valerian	Centranthus calcitrapae	*
Wild teasel	Dipsacus fullonum	
Fuller's teasel	Dipsacus sativus	*
Small teasel	Dipsacus pilosus	
Yellow-flowered teasel	Dipsacus strigosus	*
Giant scabious	Cephalaria gigantea	*
Field scabious	Knautia arvensis	
Devil's-bit scabious	Succisa pratensis	
Small scabious	Scabiosa columbaria	
Sweet scabious	Scabiosa atropurpurea	*
