= Bupleurotoxin =

Names
- IUPAC name (2Z,8E,10E,14S)-heptadeca-2,8,10-trien-4,6-diyne-1,14-diol
- Other names 14-Hydroxy-bupleurynol

Identifiers
CAS Number	111128-27-9
3D model (JSmol)	Interactive image
ChEMBL	ChEMBL1092811
ChemSpider	24669839
PubChem CID	44613554
UNII	47M62W36U4
- InChI: InChI=1S/C17H22O2/c1-2-14-17(19)15-12-10-8-6-4-3-5-7-9-11-13-16-18/h4,6,8,10-11,13,17-19H,2,12,14-16H2,1H3/b6-4+,10-8+,13-11-/t17-/m0/s1 Key: UPXPHJXYZGEBCW-PFTJZPSUSA-N
- SMILES: CCC[C@@H](CC/C=C/C=C/C#CC#C/C=C\CO)O

Properties
Chemical formula	C_{17}H_{22}O_{2}
Molar mass	258.361 g·mol^{−1}
Density	1.025 g/cm^{3}
Boiling point	458.7 °C (857.7 °F; 731.8 K)

Hazards
Flash point	213.8 °C (416.8 °F; 486.9 K)
- Lethal dose or concentration (LD, LC)
LD_{50} (median dose)	3.03 mg/kg (IP, mice)
- Except where otherwise noted, data are given for materials in their standard state (at 25 °C [77 °F], 100 kPa). Infobox references

Bupleurotoxin (BETX) is a highly toxic polyyne compound isolated primarily from the rhizomes of Bupleurum longiradiatum, a poisonous plant native to Northeast China. It is a structural isomer of cicutoxin and oenanthotoxin, and all three are powerful central nervous system stimulants and convulsants by acting as potent antagonists of GABA_{A} receptor.

Bupleurotoxin and its derivative acetylbupleurotoxin are responsible for numerous poisoning cases caused by B. longiradiatum. Historically, B. longiradiatum, particularly in Northeast China, was used as a substitute for Bupleurum chinense and Bupleurum scorzonerifolium in the traditional Chinese medicine Chaihu (Radix Bupleuri), leading to sporadic poisoning incidents. In the early 1970s, a severe poisoning outbreak occurred in Mulan County, Heilongjiang, followed by other incidents, some of which were fatal, resulting in B. longiradiatum being explicitly listed as toxic and prohibited in the 1977 edition of the Pharmacopoeia of the People's Republic of China. Research into B. longiradiatum's toxic constituents began around early 1980s, leading to the isolation and identification of bupleurotoxin and acetylbupleurotoxin in 1986. There are still occasional poisoning cases thereafter, primarily due to misidentification or mistaken use.

Bupleurotoxin is almost exclusively found in B. longiradiatum, and is only found in trace or non-detectable amount in other Bupleurum species, thus can be used as a chemical marker to identify and exclude the toxic B. longiradiatum contaminant in Chinese medicine supplies.
