= Bupleurum stenophyllum =

Scientific classification
- Kingdom: Plantae
- Clade: Tracheophytes
- Clade: Angiosperms
- Clade: Eudicots
- Clade: Asterids
- Order: Apiales
- Family: Apiaceae
- Genus: Bupleurum
- Species: B. stenophyllum

Binomial name
- Bupleurum stenophyllum (Nakai) Kitag.

Species of plant

Bupleurum stenophyllum is a species of Bupleurum native to Japan, Korea, and mainland China; it is also introduced to Taiwan. Its root is used as a traditional medicine in East Asia known as Radix Bupleuri (柴胡).

Some sources treat Bupleurum falcatum as a species complex incorporating many East Asian species such as Bupleurum stenophyllum, Bupleurum scorzonerifolium, and Bupleurum chinense. However, molecular studies indicate that these are all separate species.

== Varieties ==
- Bupleurum stenophyllum var. stenophyllum (2n = 26): Japan, Korea, Northeast China.
- Bupleurum stenophyllum var. kiusianum Kitag. (2n = 20): Japan (Kyushu and Yamaguchi), Korea, and Northeast China.
- Bupleurum stenophyllum var. leiocarpum X.J.He & C.B.Wang (2n = 26): Southwest China (Sichuan).
- Bupleurum stenophyllum var. obvallatum (Nakai) Kitag.: Japan (Iki).
