= Paul Sintenis =

German botanist, pharmacist and important plant collector

Paul Ernst Emil Sintenis (4 April 1847 Seidenberg, Oberlausitz, Prussia – 6 March 1907) was a German botanist, pharmacist and important plant collector.

== Biography ==
He studied at the gymnasium in Görlitz, became a pharmacist's apprentice in 1863 and worked as such in several German cities. His first collecting trip, in the years 1872–1876, was as helper to his brother Max, with whom he collected birds, mammals and plants in the Dobruja. After further pharmaceutical studies in Breslau (now Wrocław) and another short stint as pharmacist, he spent the rest of his professional life as a plant collector. Between the years 1880 and 1883 he collected on Rhodes, Cyprus, Northern Italy, and Istria. Sintenis arrived in Puerto Rico in October 1884 and, supported by Leopold Krug, remained there until June 1887. He subsequently collected in Turkey, Syria, Iraq, Turkmenistan, Iran, and Greece. Sintensis issued about ten exsiccata-like series, among others Iter orientale 1888 and Iter transcaspico-persicum 1900-1901.. For editing and distributing the series Iter cyprium 1880 and Iter turcicum 1891 Sintenis cooperated with Gregorio Rigo and Alfred Bornmüller.

Sintenis's herbarium was acquired by Lund University (Sweden), where it is still kept. The first set of his Puerto Rican collections was mostly destroyed at Dahlem (Berlin) during the Second World War, but duplicates survived in all major herbaria, primarily Kew, the British Museum, Harvard, New York Botanical Garden, and the National Museum of Natural History in Washington.

== Eponymy ==
The plant taxa Bupleurum sintenisii, Hieracium sintenisii, Iris sintenisii, Cistus sintenisii, Rhinanthus sintenisii, Psidium sintenisii, Marlierea sintenisii, Matelea sintenisii, Ornithogalum sintenisii, Podonosma sintenisii and Ilex sintenisii are named in his honor.

== Bibliography ==
(from WorldCat)

- Crépin, François. Les roses récoltées par M. Paul Sintenis dans l'Arménie turque en 1889. S.l., 1890.
- Bresadola, G.; P Hennings; P Magnus; . Sintenis, P.E.E. Die vom Herrn P. Sintenis auf der Insel Portorico 1884-1887 gesammelten Pilze. W. Engelmann, Leipzig, 1893.
- Freyn, J. Plantæ novæ orientales. VI, Verzeichnis der von P. Sintenis in Ost-Masenderan gesammelten Pflanzen. Impr. Romet, Genève, 1902.

== Sources ==
- Stafleu, F.A. & Cowan, R.S. 1985. Taxonomic literature. Vol. 5: Sal-Ste. 2nd ed. Bohn, Scheltema & Holkema, Utrecht/Antwerpen.
- Urban, Ignaz, Notae Biographicae, Symbolae Antillanae 3:127,1902.
