= Petrocoptis pseudoviscosa =

Conservation status
- Vulnerable (IUCN 3.1)

Scientific classification
- Kingdom: Plantae
- Clade: Tracheophytes
- Clade: Angiosperms
- Clade: Eudicots
- Order: Caryophyllales
- Family: Caryophyllaceae
- Genus: Petrocoptis
- Species: P. pseudoviscosa

Binomial name
- Petrocoptis pseudoviscosa Fern. Casas
- Approximate location in the Iberian Peninsula

Species of flowering plant

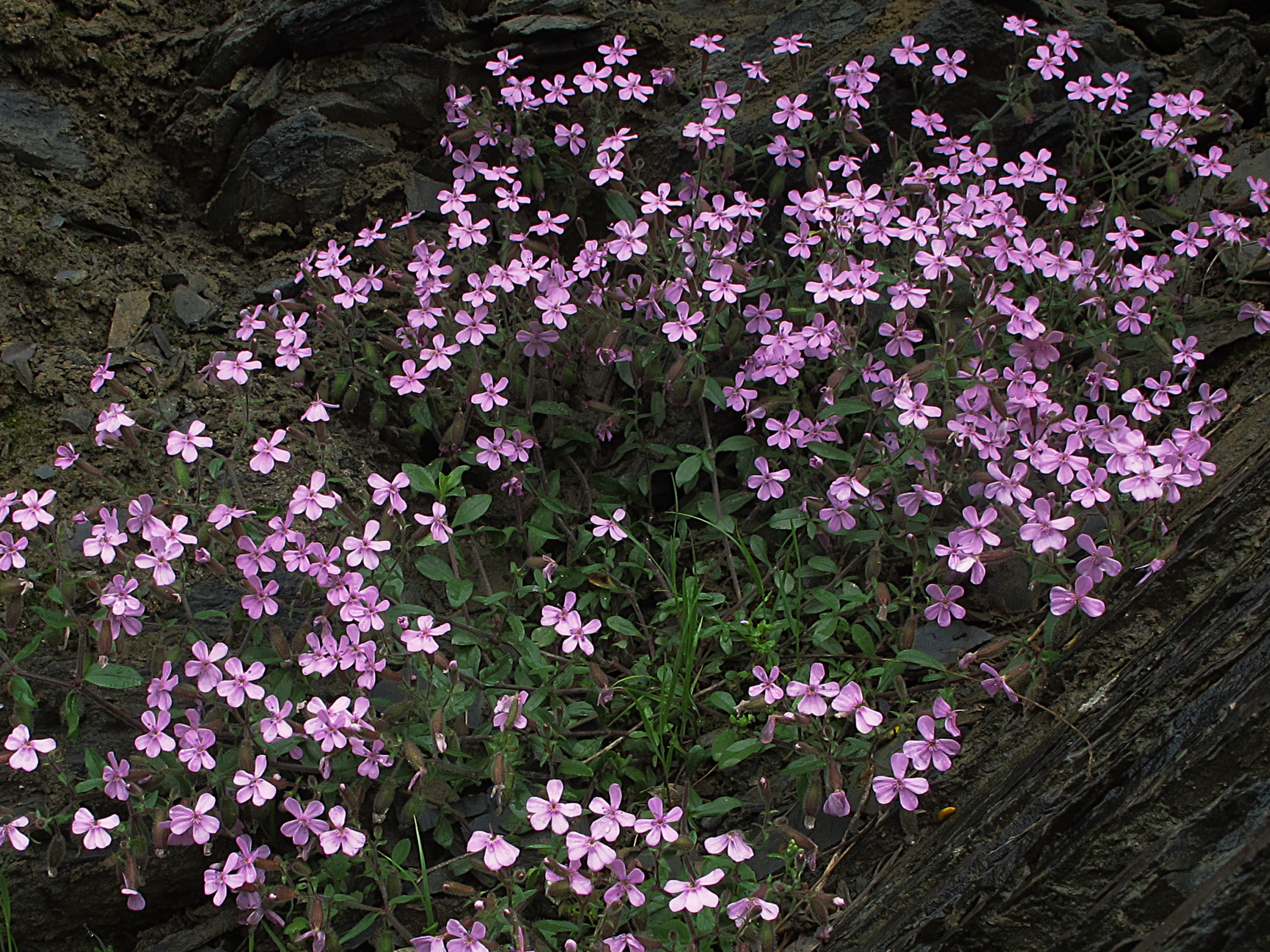
Petrocoptis crassifolia, a close relative of P. pseudoviscosa

Petrocoptis pseudoviscosa, commonly known as falguera, is a species of plant in the family Caryophyllaceae. It is endemic to the Spanish province of Huesca, where it is only known from the Valle del Ésera in the Pyrenees. Its natural habitat is calcareous cliffs, crags and caves.

== Distribution and habitat ==
Petrocoptis pseudoviscosa is known from a single valley on the Spanish side of the Pyrenees Mountains. The total area of occupancy of the plant is about 11 km^{2} (4 mi^{2}) with locations scattered along about 20 km (12 mi) of the valley at altitudes varying between 700 and 1,600 m (2,300 and 5,200 ft). The plants grow in crevices in inaccessible rocky outcrops, cliffs and caves. There are five populations, varying in size from about a hundred plants to a few thousands.

== Ecology ==
Although cross pollination is normal in this species, the flowers can self-pollinate, and the seeds produced by this process have been found to germinate equally well as those from cross-fertilised flowers. Other plants growing in close vicinity to Petrocoptis pseudoviscosa include the ferns Cystopteris fragilis, Asplenium ruta-muraria, Asplenium fontanum and Asplenium csikii, as well as the herbs Lonicera pyrenaica, Saxifraga longifolia, Chaenorhinum origanifolium, Sarcocapnos enneaphylla, Hieracium phlomoides and Bupleurum angulosum.

== Conservation status ==
Because of its restricted distribution and the small number of locations at which it occurs, the International Union for Conservation of Nature has assessed the conservation status of this plant as "vulnerable", with the main threats it faces coming from quarrying of stone for road maintenance, and from damage to the plants by rock climbers. Seed predation is another problem, but if seeds successfully disperse to a new suitable habitats, the plant's ability to self-pollinate may be crucial to it in establishing a new population.
