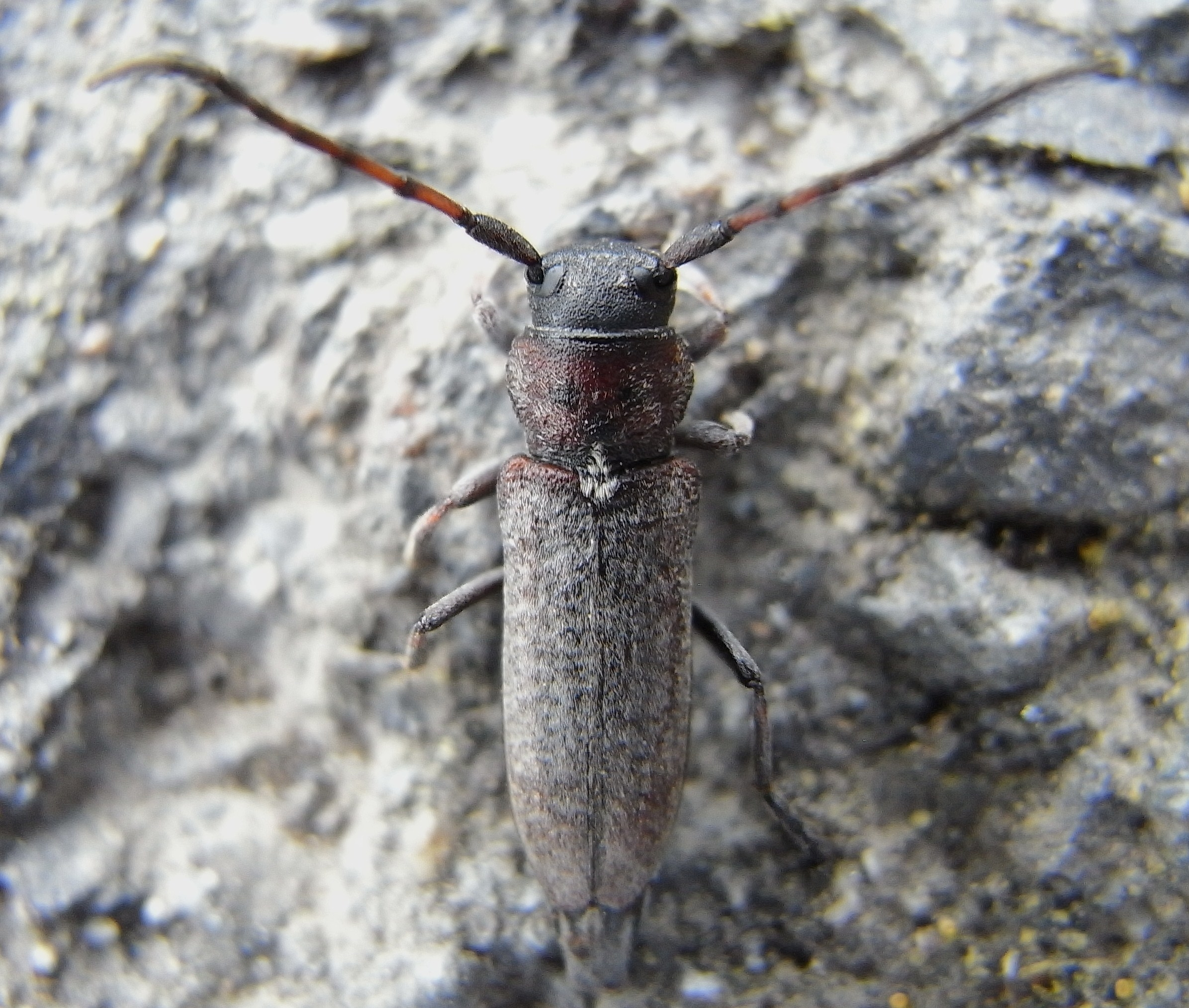

Scientific classification
- Kingdom: Animalia
- Phylum: Arthropoda
- Clade: Pancrustacea
- Class: Insecta
- Order: Coleoptera
- Suborder: Polyphaga
- Infraorder: Cucujiformia
- Family: Cerambycidae
- Genus: Phytoecia
- Species: P. scutellata

Binomial name
- Phytoecia scutellata (Fabricius, 1793)

Synonyms
- Saperda scutellata Fabricius, 1793; Cardoria scutellata (Fabricius)

= Phytoecia scutellata =

Species of beetle

Phytoecia scutellata is a species of beetle in the family Cerambycidae. It was described by Johan Christian Fabricius in 1793, originally under the genus Saperda. It has a wide distribution in Europe, although its populations in Germany and the Czech Republic are reportedly extinct. It measures between 7 and 14 mm (0.28 and 0.55 in).

P. scutellata feeds on Falcaria vulgaris.
