= C17H22O2 =

The molecular formula C_{17}H_{22}O_{2} (molar mass: 258.35 g/mol, exact mass: 258.1620 u) may refer to:

- Bupleurotoxin
- Cannabidiorcol
- Cicutoxin
- Oenanthotoxin
- O-1602
