= Agonopterix adspersella =

Scientific classification
- Kingdom: Animalia
- Phylum: Arthropoda
- Clade: Pancrustacea
- Class: Insecta
- Order: Lepidoptera
- Family: Depressariidae
- Genus: Agonopterix
- Species: A. adspersella

Binomial name
- Agonopterix adspersella (Kollar, 1832)

Synonyms
- Haemylis adspersella Kollar, 1832; Depressaria amanthicella Heinemann, 1870; Agonopterix athamanticella Steudel & Hofmann, 1882; Agonopterix reichlini Heinemann, 1870; Depressaria sabulatella Turati, 1921; Depressaria rubripunctella Amsel, 1935; Depressaria karmeliella Amsel, 1935

Species of moth

Agonopterix adspersella is a moth of the family Depressariidae. It is found in southern Europe, Asia Minor, the Palestinian Territories, Iran and the Crimea.

The larvae feed on Bupleurum falcatum. They spin the leaves of their host plant together to create a shelter from which they feed. Pupation takes place on the ground in a spinning of sand grains.
