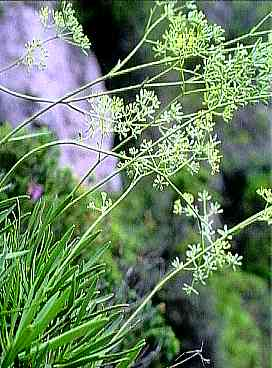

Conservation status
- Critically Endangered (IUCN 3.1)

Scientific classification
- Kingdom: Plantae
- Clade: Tracheophytes
- Clade: Angiosperms
- Clade: Eudicots
- Clade: Asterids
- Order: Apiales
- Family: Apiaceae
- Genus: Bupleurum
- Species: B. dianthifolium

Binomial name
- Bupleurum dianthifolium Guss.

= Bupleurum dianthifolium =

Species of flowering plant

Bupleurum dianthifolium is a species of flowering plant in the family Apiaceae. It is endemic to Marettimo in the Aegadian Islands west of Sicily. Its natural habitat is Mediterranean-type shrubby vegetation. It is threatened by habitat loss.
