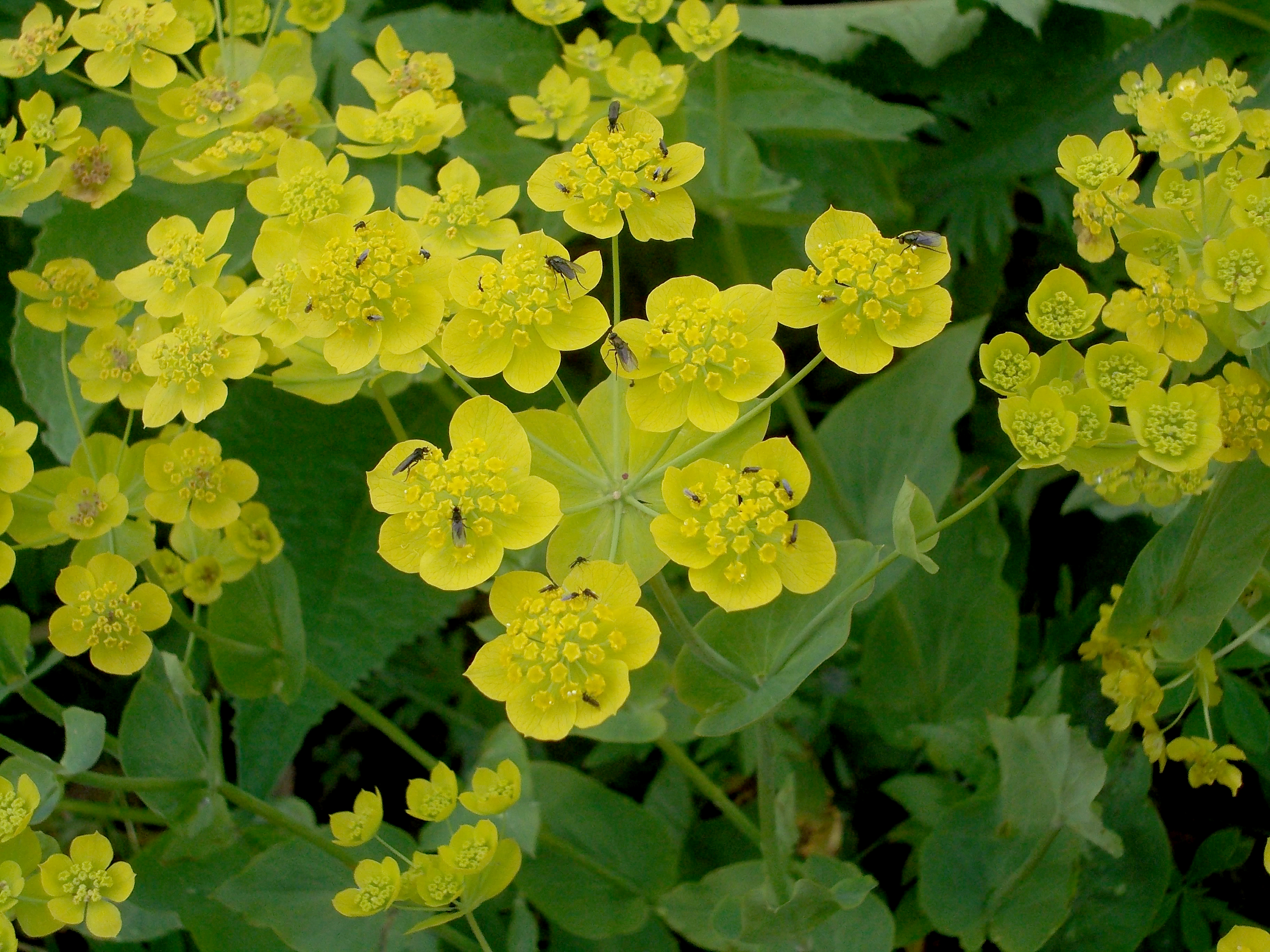

Scientific classification
- Kingdom: Plantae
- Clade: Tracheophytes
- Clade: Angiosperms
- Clade: Eudicots
- Clade: Asterids
- Order: Apiales
- Family: Apiaceae
- Genus: Bupleurum
- Species: B. aureum

Binomial name
- Bupleurum aureum Fisch. ex Hoffm. ,1814

= Bupleurum aureum =

Species of flowering plant

Bupleurum aureum is a flowering plant in the family Apiaceae. The plant is native to Xinjiang, Kazakhstan, Kyrgyzstan, Mongolia, and Russia. It is a perennial plant that grows 50–120 cm (20–47 in). Its habitats include open forests, mountain slopes, and river banks.
