= Bupleurum semicompositum =

Scientific classification
- Kingdom: Plantae
- Clade: Tracheophytes
- Clade: Angiosperms
- Clade: Eudicots
- Clade: Asterids
- Order: Apiales
- Family: Apiaceae
- Genus: Bupleurum
- Species: B. semicompositum

Binomial name
- Bupleurum semicompositum L.

Synonyms
- Bupleurum glaucum

Species of plant

Bupleurum semicompositum, the dwarf hare's ear, is a species of annual herb in the family Apiaceae. They have a self-supporting growth form and simple, broad leaves and dry fruit. Individuals can grow to 0.3m tall.

== Sources ==
This article incorporates text from a free content work. Licensed under CC0 (license statement/permission). Text taken from Bupleurum semicompositum. Encyclopedia of Life.
