= Bupleurum libanoticum =

Scientific classification
- Kingdom: Plantae
- Clade: Tracheophytes
- Clade: Angiosperms
- Clade: Eudicots
- Clade: Asterids
- Order: Apiales
- Family: Apiaceae
- Genus: Bupleurum
- Species: B. libanoticum

Binomial name
- Bupleurum libanoticum Boiss. & C.I.Blanche

Synonyms
- Bupleurum libanoticum f. laxum Bornm.; Bupleurum libanoticum f. strictum Bornm.

Species of flowering plant

Bupleurum libanoticum, the Lebanon hare's ear (Arabic: دبيق لبناني), is an annual flowering plant in the family Apiaceae. It is native to Lebanon, Syria and southern Turkey. It grows in rocky mountain habitats and on limestone slopes.

== Taxonomy ==
The species was described by Edmond Boissier and Charles Isidore Blanche in 1856. The description was published in the second series of Boissier's Diagnoses Plantarum Orientalium Novarum. In 1898, the German botanist Joseph Bornmüller described two distinct infraspecific forms of the taxon based on variations in growth habit: Bupleurum libanoticum f. laxum and Bupleurum libanoticum f. strictum.

== Description ==
The erect stem is 30–80 cm tall, with flattened, spreading branches. The leaves are entire and linear, with five parallel longitudinal veins. The inflorescence is a compound umbel with four or five short, unequal rays and small yellow flowers. The fruits are dry and prismatic.

== Distribution and habitat ==
The native distribution of Bupleurum libanoticum is restricted to the Levant and southern Anatolia. The species occurs in southern Turkey, western Syria, the West Syrian Mountains, the Anti-Lebanon Mountains and central and western Lebanon. It grows in rocky mountain habitats and on limestone slopes. In Lebanon, it has been recorded in the Jaj Cedars Nature Reserve and Jabal Moussa Biosphere Reserve.

== See also ==
- Flora of Lebanon
