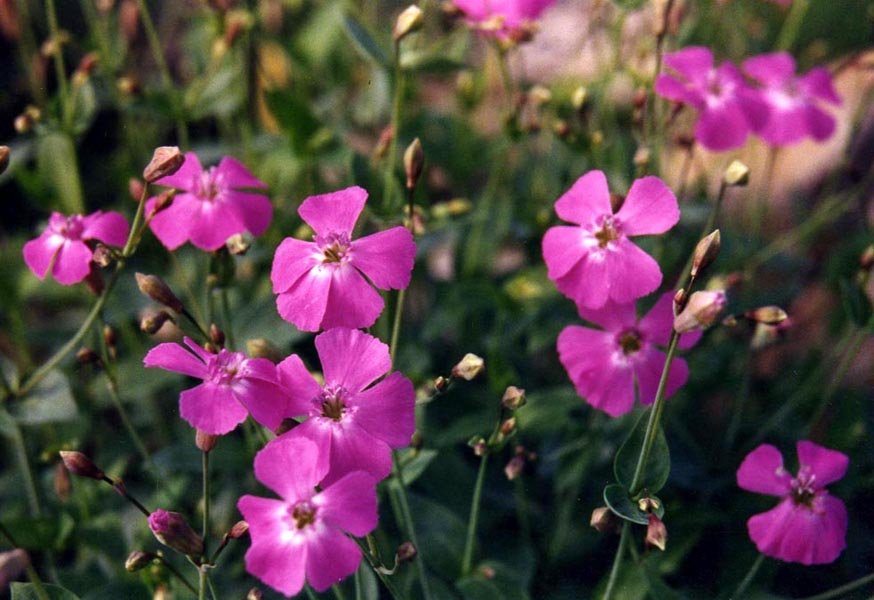
- Petrocoptis glaucifolia.

Scientific classification
- Kingdom: Plantae
- Clade: Tracheophytes
- Clade: Angiosperms
- Clade: Eudicots
- Order: Caryophyllales
- Family: Caryophyllaceae
- Genus: Petrocoptis; A.Braun ex Endl.

= Petrocoptis =

Genus of plants

Petrocoptis is a genus of flowering plants belonging to the family Caryophyllaceae.

Its native range is Pyrenees to Northern Spain.

== Species ==
Species:

- Petrocoptis crassifolia Rouy
- Petrocoptis glaucifolia (Lag.) Boiss.
- Petrocoptis grandiflora Rothm.
- Petrocoptis guarensis Fern.Casas
- Petrocoptis hispanica (Willk.) Pau
- Petrocoptis montserratii Fern.Casas
- Petrocoptis montsicciana O.Bolòs & Rivas Mart.
- Petrocoptis pardoi Pau
- Petrocoptis pseudoviscosa Fern.Casas
- Petrocoptis pyrenaica (Bergeret) A.Braun ex Walp.
- Petrocoptis wiedmannii Merxm. & Grau
