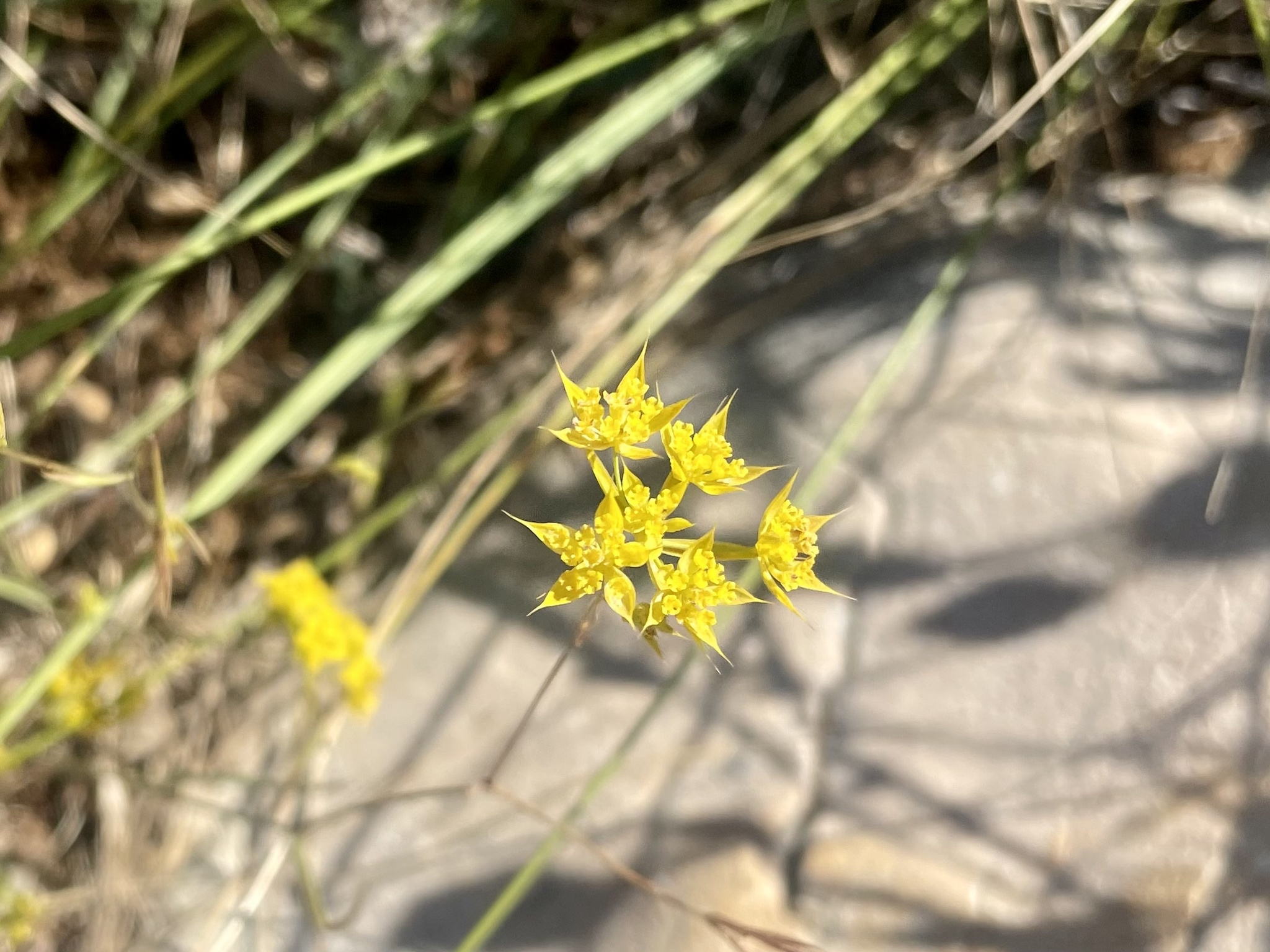

Scientific classification
- Kingdom: Plantae
- Clade: Tracheophytes
- Clade: Angiosperms
- Clade: Eudicots
- Clade: Asterids
- Order: Apiales
- Family: Apiaceae
- Genus: Bupleurum
- Species: B. veronense

Binomial name
- Bupleurum veronense Turra

= Bupleurum veronense =

Species of flowering plant

Bupleurum veronense is a plant species of the genus Bupleurum.
