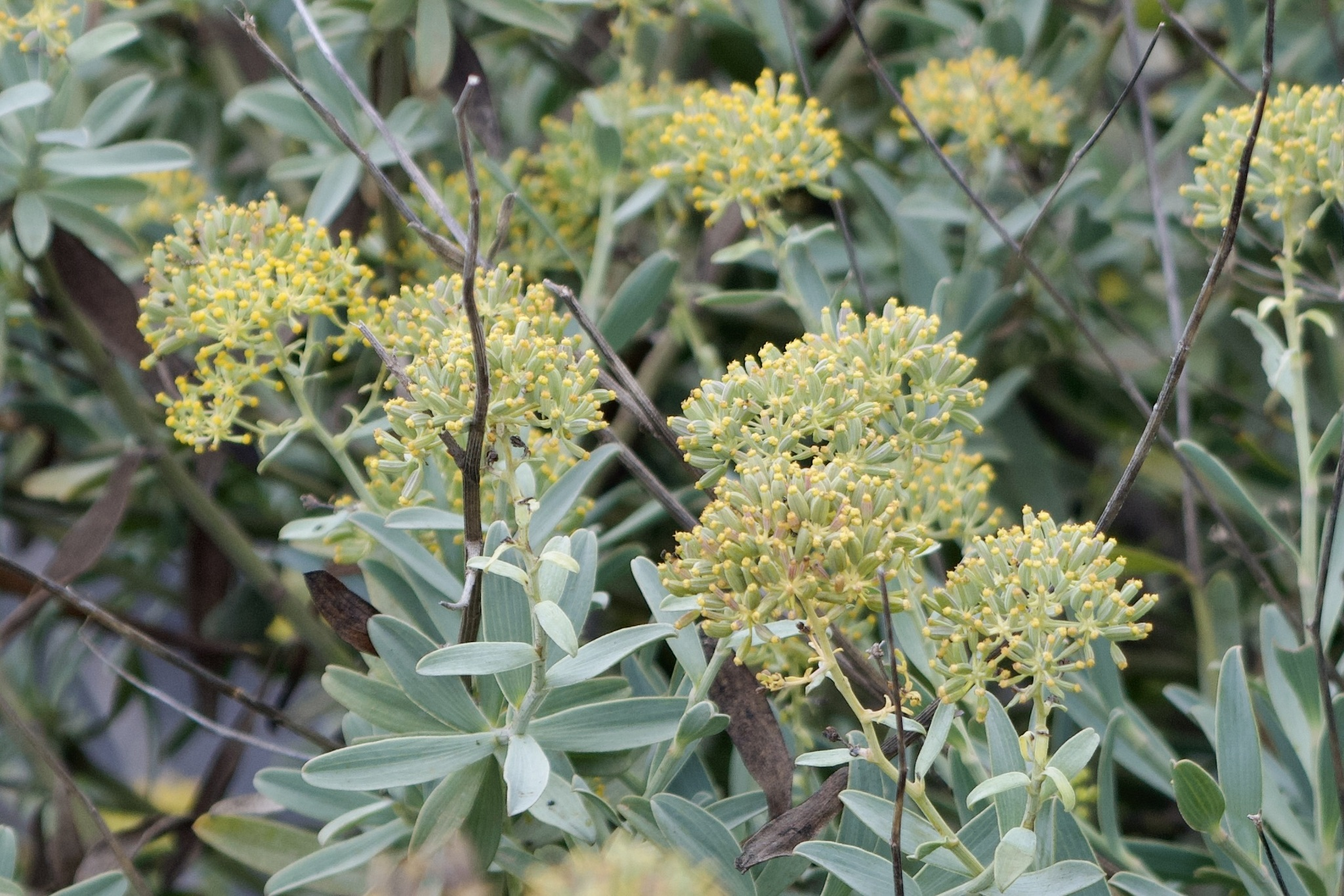

Conservation status
- Endangered (IUCN 3.1)

Scientific classification
- Kingdom: Plantae
- Clade: Tracheophytes
- Clade: Angiosperms
- Clade: Eudicots
- Clade: Asterids
- Order: Apiales
- Family: Apiaceae
- Genus: Bupleurum
- Species: B. handiense

Binomial name
- Bupleurum handiense (Bolle) Kunkel, 1977

= Bupleurum handiense =

Species of plant

Bupleurum handiense, the Jandía anise, is a species of flowering plant in the Apiaceae family. It was described by Günther Willi Hermann Kunkel in 1976. It is endemic to the eastern Canary Islands (Lanzarote and Fuerteventura), where it grows between 300 and 800 meters above sea level. It is classified by the IUCN Red List as endangered and it's primarily threatened by animal grazing.
