= Marettimo =

- Island
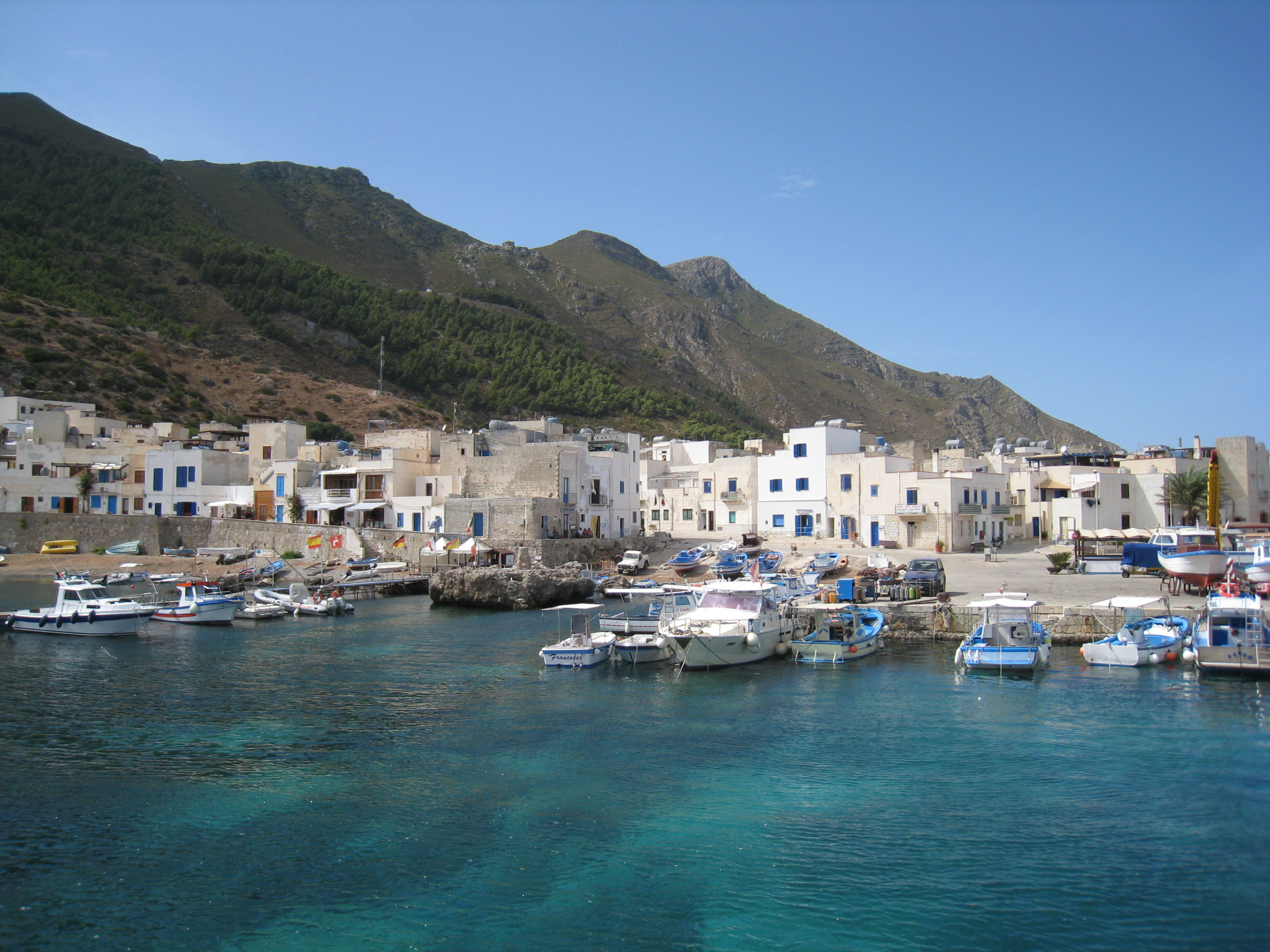
- Port of Marettimo

- Location in Italy
- Coordinates: 37°58′10″N 12°03′26″E
- Country: Italy
- Province: Trapani
- Comune: Favignana
- Elevation: 686 m (2,251 ft)

Population
  - Total: 300−700

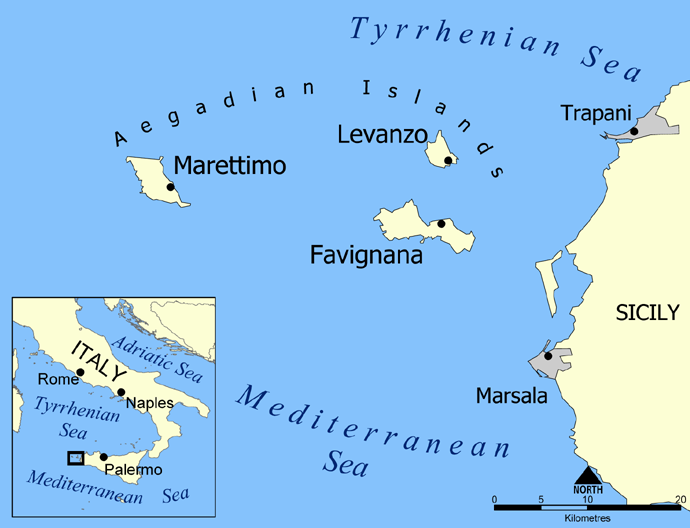
A map showing the Aegadian Islands. Marettimo is the westernmost island.

Marettimo (Italian pronunciation: [maˈrettimo]; Sicilian: Marrètimu) is one of the Aegadian Islands in the Mediterranean Sea west of Sicily, Italy. It forms a part of the municipality (comune) of Favignana in the Province of Trapani. It takes about an hour to reach the island from Trapani.

== History ==
The ancient name of the island was Hiera, part of the Greek name Hierà Nèsos (Ἱερά Νήσος), which means "Sacred Island" in Greek. Indeed, its Latin name used by Pliny was also "Sacra". The name Marettimo probably comes from the words mar (sea) and timo (thyme) due to the profusion of thyme on the island. However, it may stem from a local pronunciation of the word "maritimo".

The island was an important observation point during Roman times, hence the Casa Romana, where it was easy to observe passing maritime traffic. The sea routes between Italy and North Africa and Italy and Spain (via Sardinia) would pass Marettimo.

Abu Abd Allah Muhammad al-Idrisi (1099–1165 or 1166), the Moroccan Muslim geographer, cartographer, Egyptologist and traveller who lived in Sicily at the court of King Roger II, mentioned this island, naming it جزيرة مليطمة (jazīrat Malīṭma, "the island of Malitma") on page 583 of his book Nuzhat al-mushtaq fi ihtiraq ghal afaq, otherwise known as The Book of Roger, considered a geographic encyclopaedia of the medieval world.

There is a restored Byzantine-Norman church adjacent to the Casa Romana. There are several grottos around the island's coast and spots for swimming in the waters on the western coast accessible only by boat.

== Geography ==
Marettimo is the second largest of the Aegadian Islands. The highest point is Montefalcone with a height of 686 m (2,251 ft). The island has about 300 inhabitants in the winter and 700 in the summer (not including tourists), who mainly live from fishing, tourism and traditional handcrafts. Fishing is predominantly conducted in the summer months.

== Flora and fauna ==
The island is home to about 500 plant species, many of them indigenous and very rare, among the most endangered being Bupleurum dianthifolium, Brassica macrocarpa, Scilla hughii and Thymus richardii subsp. nitidus; the last was chemically investigated.

There is a sizeable population of donkeys and horses on the island. There are wild goats, rabbits, eagles, peregrine falcons, and gulls.

== See also ==
- List of islands of Italy

== Gallery ==
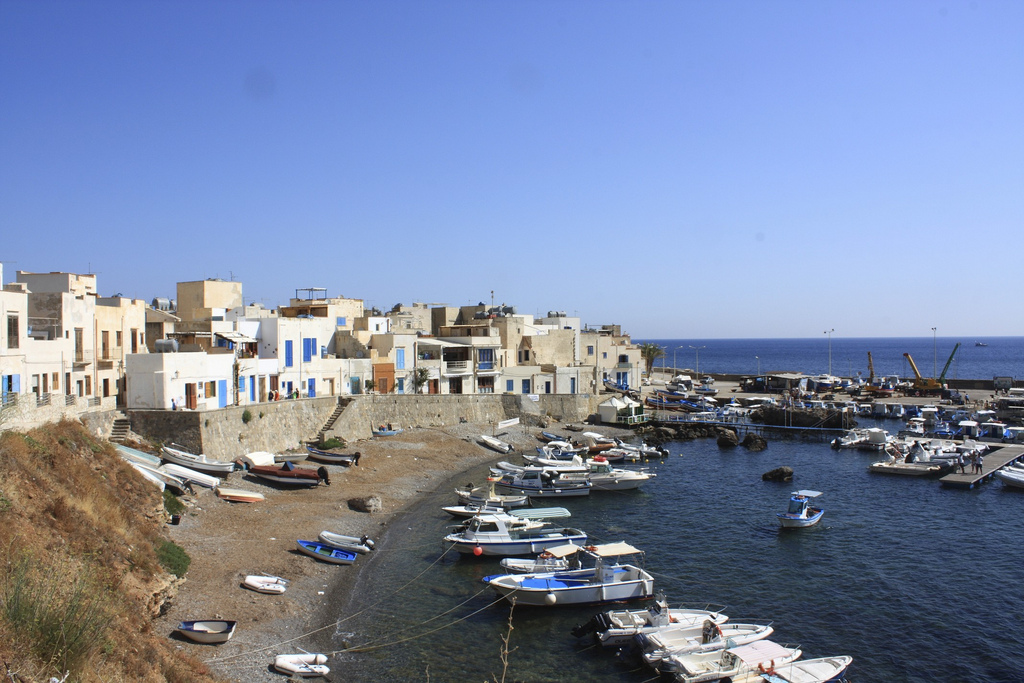
The village of Marettimo

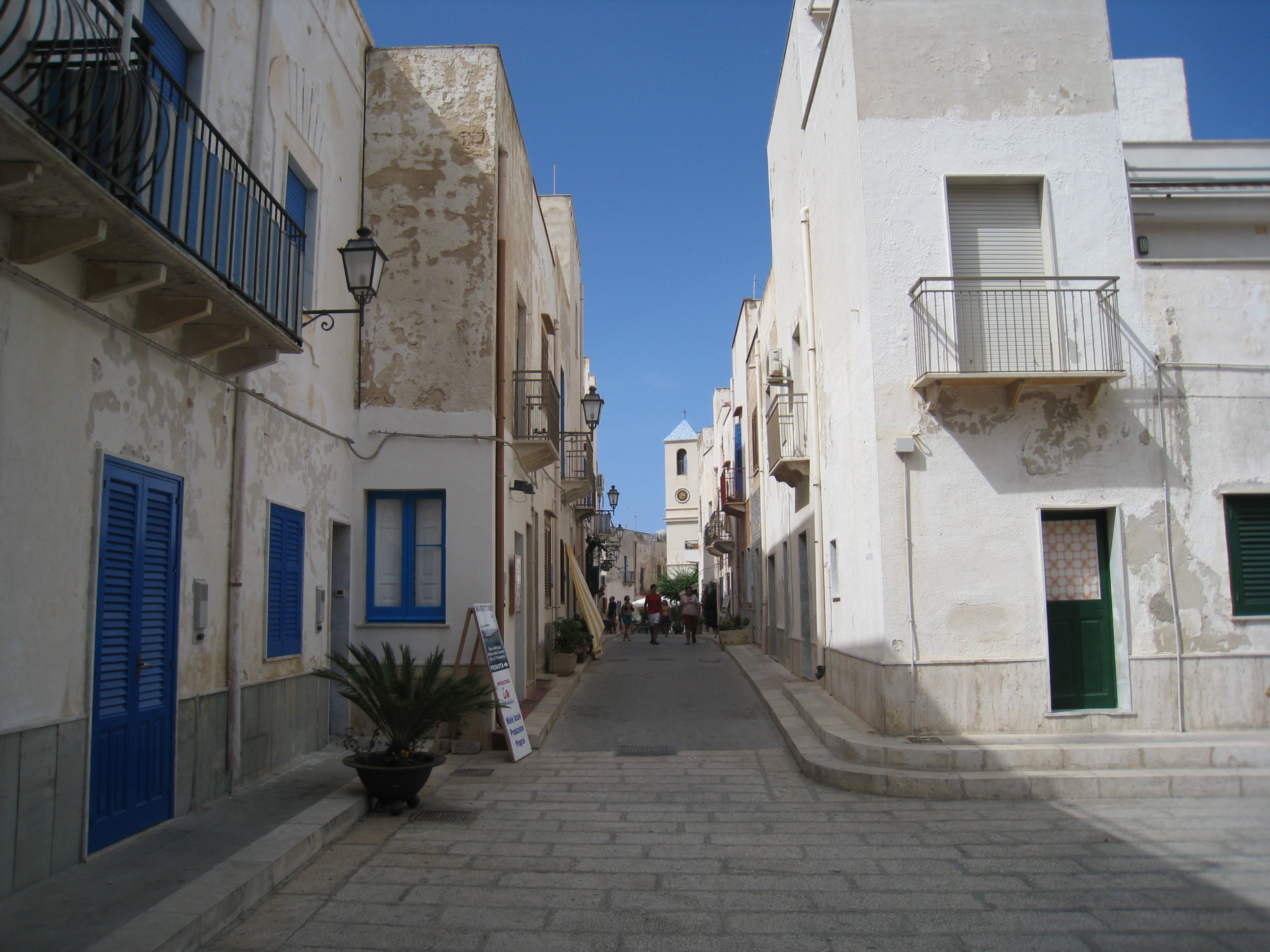
Inside the village

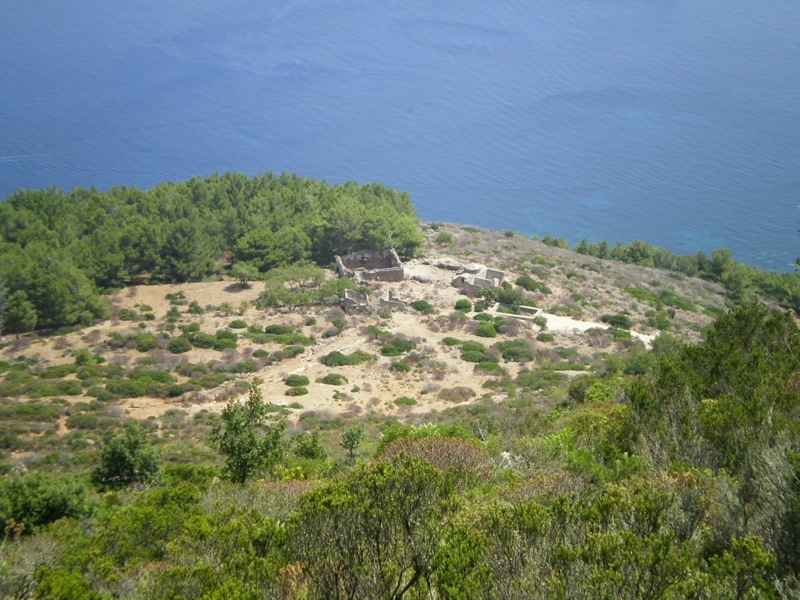
The ruins of the "Casa Romana" settlement.

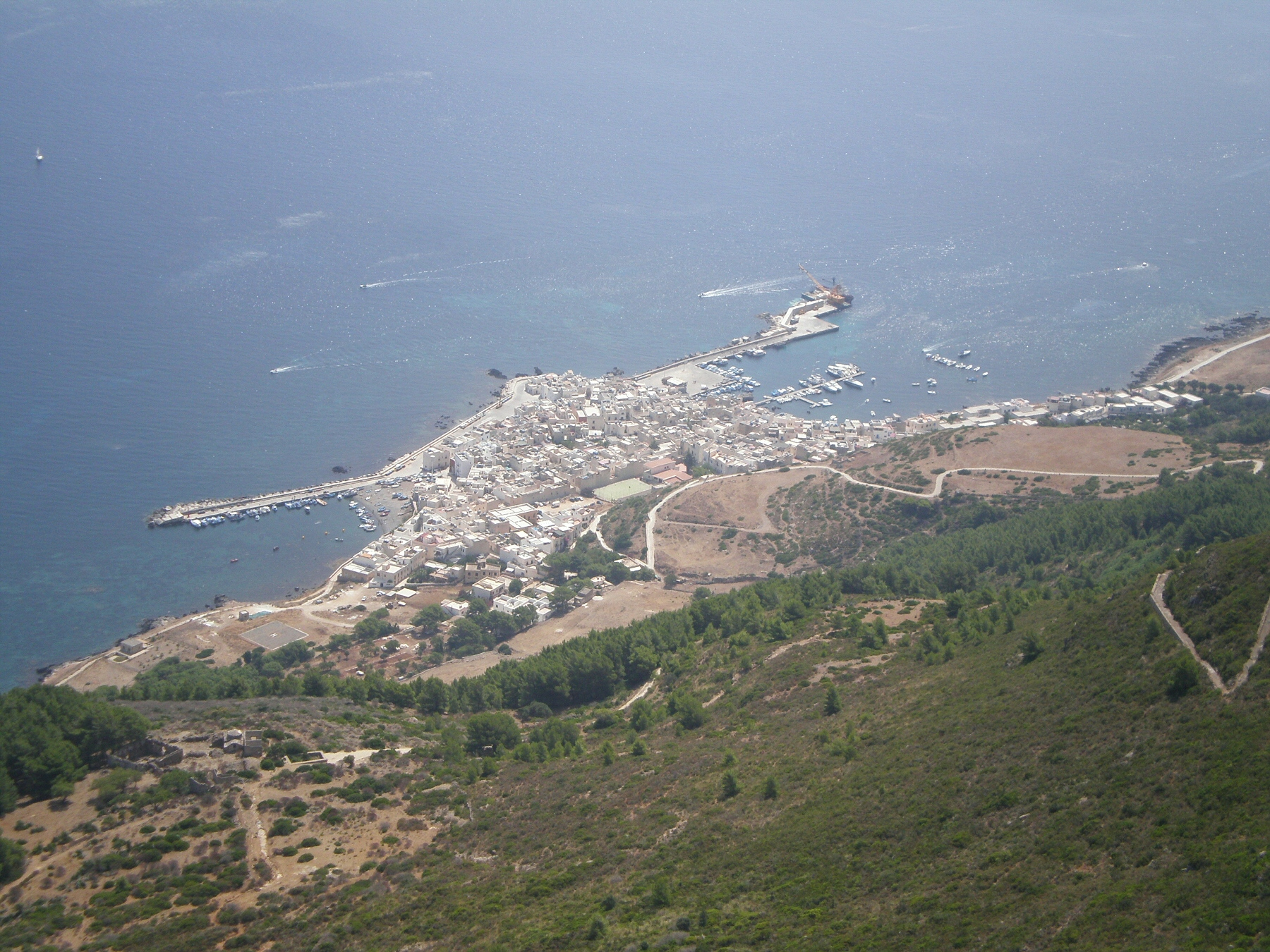
From a ridge above town: Scalo Vecchio on the left, Scalo Nuovo on the right, and the Casa Romana in the left foreground.

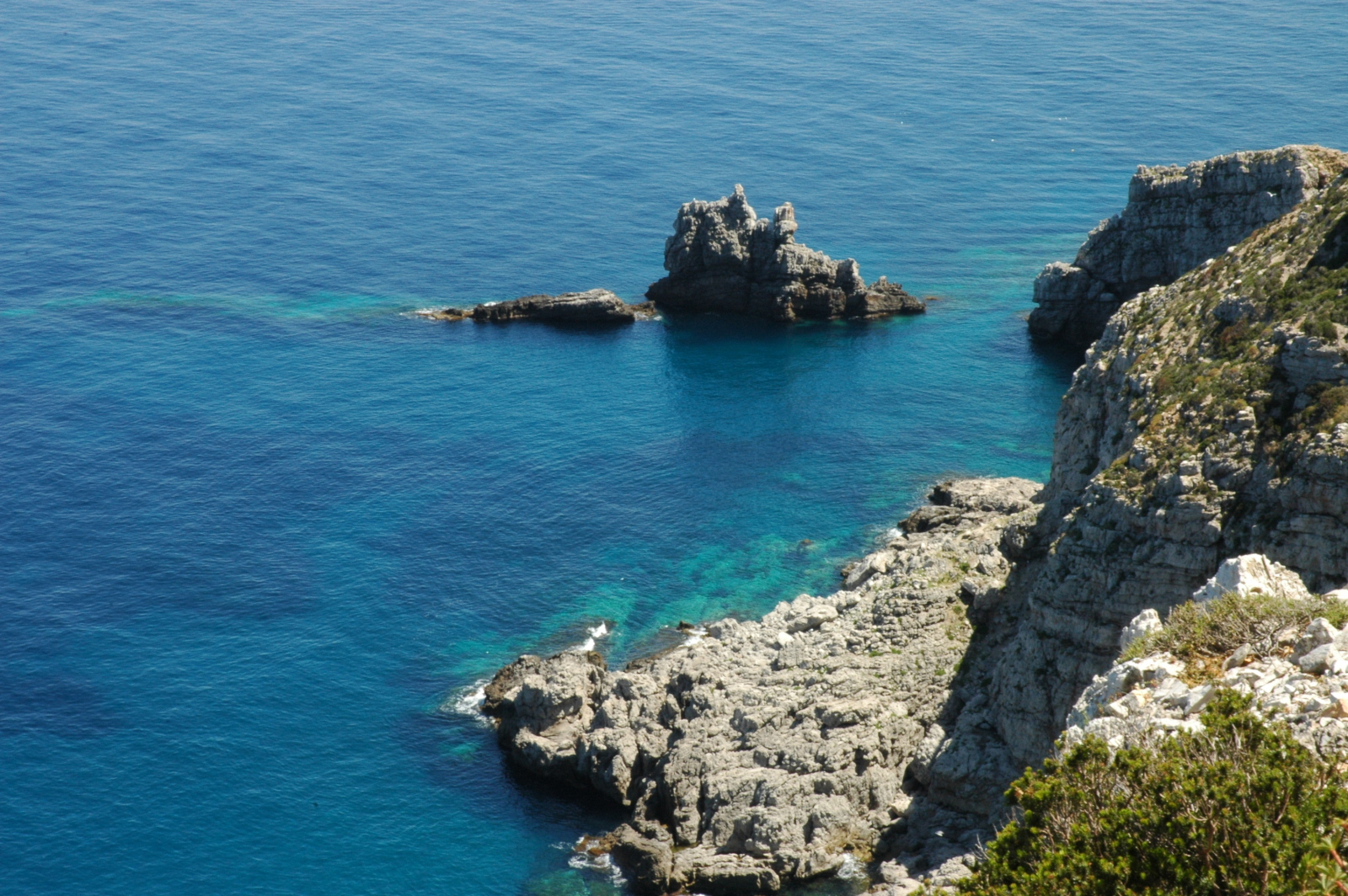
Scoglio del Cammello
