= Bupleurum kakiskalae =

Conservation status
- Endangered (IUCN 3.1)

Scientific classification
- Kingdom: Plantae
- Clade: Tracheophytes
- Clade: Angiosperms
- Clade: Eudicots
- Clade: Asterids
- Order: Apiales
- Family: Apiaceae
- Genus: Bupleurum
- Species: B. kakiskalae

Binomial name
- Bupleurum kakiskalae Greuter

Species of flowering plant

Bupleurum kakiskalae is a species of flowering plant in the family Apiaceae. It is endemic to western Crete, an island which is part of Greece.

One of Crete's rarest plants, B. kakiskalae grows on a few calcareous cliffs at 1450-1500m in the Lefka Ori (White Mountains) of western Crete. Plants produce a single, monocarpic rosette of narrow oblanceolate, blue-green leaves which flowers after three to twelve years. The flower stem is branched and up to one metre tall, with numerous heads of yellow flowers in late summer. The plant reproduces by seed, but most seed falls to the ground below the cliffs where the young seedlings are destroyed by goats. The plant is taxonomically isolated within the genus Bupleurum.

It was classified as 'endangered' in the IUCN Red List in 2024. In the European Union it has been designated as a 'priority species' under Annex II of the Habitats Directive since 1992, which means areas in which it occurs can be declared Special Areas of Conservation, if these areas belong to one of the number of habitats listed in Annex I of the directive.
