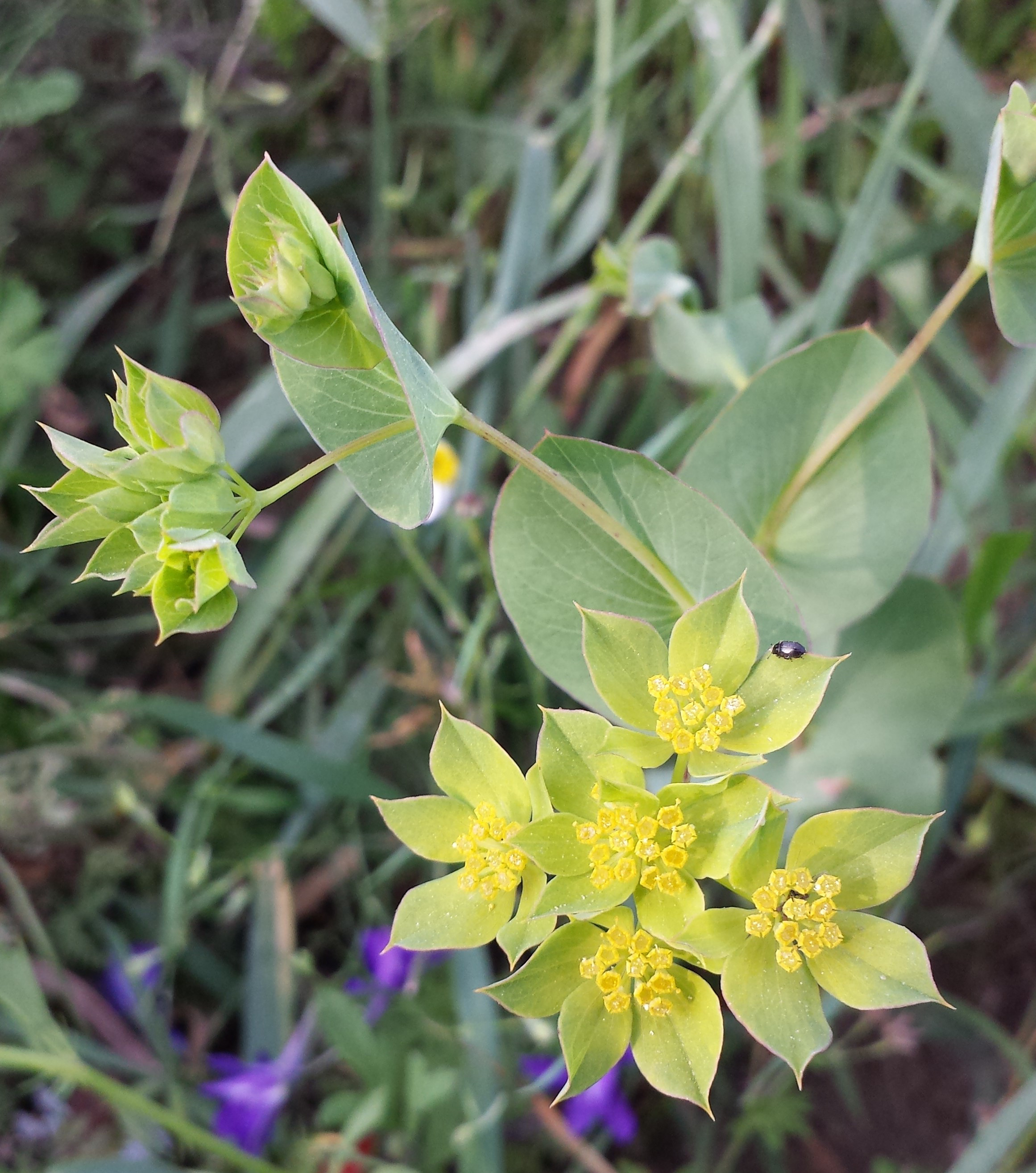

Scientific classification
- Kingdom: Plantae
- Clade: Embryophytes
- Clade: Tracheophytes
- Clade: Angiosperms
- Clade: Eudicots
- Clade: Asterids
- Order: Apiales
- Family: Apiaceae
- Genus: Bupleurum
- Species: B. rotundifolium

Binomial name
- Bupleurum rotundifolium L.

Synonyms
- List: Bupleurum perfoliatum Lam.; Bupleurum perfoliatum var. rotundifolium (L.) Desv.; Diatropa rotundifolia (L.) Dumort.; Perfoliata rotundifolia (L.) Fourr.; Perfolisa obtusifolia Raf.; Selinum perfoliatum E.H.L.Krause; Tenoria rotundifolia Bubani

= Bupleurum rotundifolium =

Species of flowering plant

Bupleurum rotundifolium, hare's ear or hound's ear, is a species of flowering plant in the genus Bupleurum, it is native to Morocco, Algeria, southern, central and eastern Europe, Turkey, Iran, Turkmenistan, and Kyrgyzstan. Successful in disturbed areas, it is now an established weed in the eastern United States, and in South Africa, and is introduced elsewhere.
