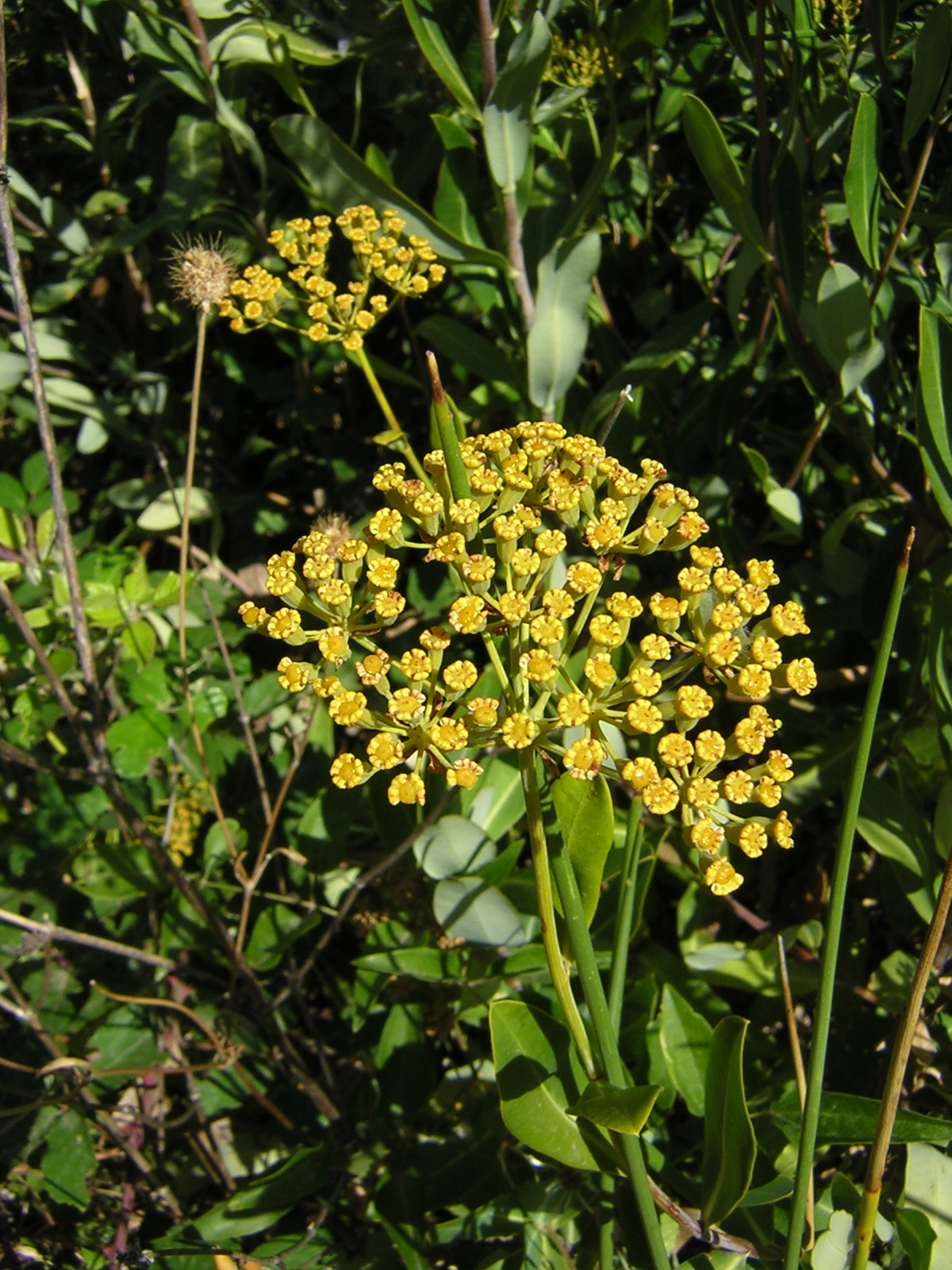

Scientific classification
- Kingdom: Plantae
- Clade: Tracheophytes
- Clade: Angiosperms
- Clade: Eudicots
- Clade: Asterids
- Order: Apiales
- Family: Apiaceae
- Genus: Bupleurum
- Species: B. fruticosum

Binomial name
- Bupleurum fruticosum L., 1753

= Bupleurum fruticosum =

Species of flowering plant

Bupleurum fruticosum or shrubby hare's-ear is a species of flowering plant in the family Apiaceae. It is endemic to the Mediterranean region. It lives in sunny hills, walls and rocky places.

== Description ==
This plant is an evergreen shrub up to 2 metres (6.6 ft) tall, with simple, obovate, blue-green leaves and clusters of tiny yellow flowers. It is in flower from June to September, and the seeds ripen from August to October. The flowers are hermaphrodite (have both male and female organs) and are pollinated by wasps. The plant is self-fertile. It is noted for attracting wildlife.

== Cultivation and uses ==
It grows in any well-drained soil in a warm sheltered site with full sun. It propagates by seed in containers in a cold frame in spring, and semi-ripe cuttings can also be rooted in summer.

This species makes a very good wind-shelter hedge in exposed maritime positions, though it is slow growing. Plants can be used as a tall ground cover when planted about 1.2 metres (3.9 ft) apart each way.
