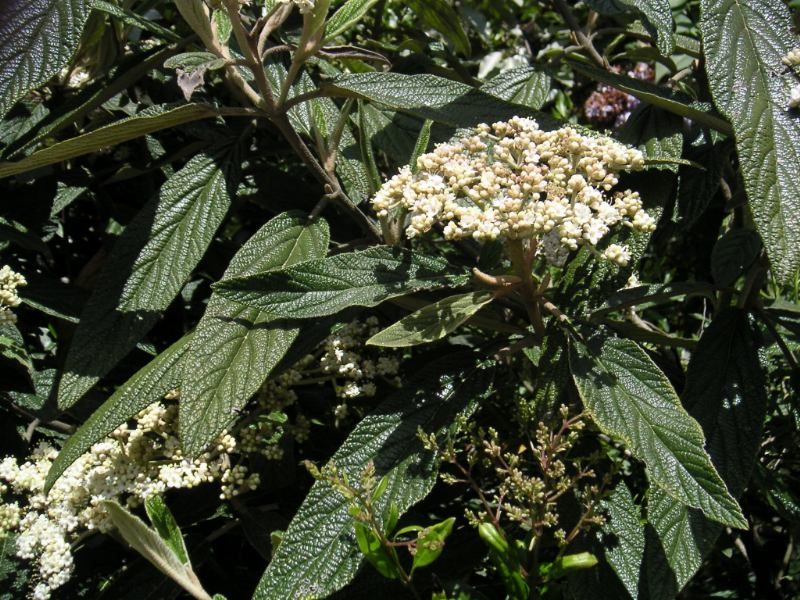
- Foliage and inflorescence

Scientific classification
- Kingdom: Plantae
- Clade: Tracheophytes
- Clade: Angiosperms
- Clade: Eudicots
- Clade: Asterids
- Order: Dipsacales
- Family: Adoxaceae
- Genus: Viburnum
- Species: V. rhytidophyllum

Binomial name
- Viburnum rhytidophyllum Hemsl.

Synonyms
- Callicarpa vastifolia Diels; Viburnum rhytidophyllum f. roseum (Anon.) Rehder; Viburnum rhytidophyllum roseum C.H.Curtis

= Viburnum rhytidophyllum =

Species of shrub

Viburnum rhytidophyllum, the leatherleaf viburnum, is a species of flowering plant in the family Viburnaceae. It is native to Asia.

This vigorous, coarsely textured evergreen shrub has an upright habit and 8-inch (20 cm) long, lustrous, deeply veined oval leaves with dark blue-green surfaces and pale green undersides. The leaf stems are fuzzy brown. In spring, fragrant creamy-white flowers bloom in clusters. Blue berries form in June and become plump through September, maturing to glossy black. Plants grow 10–15 feet (3.0–4.6 m) tall and wide.

The plant is an evergreen shrub or small tree with a suckering habit. The leaves are opposite, crinkled, downy on the underside, less so on the upper surface.

== Etymology ==
Rhytidophyllum comes from the Ancient Greek ῤυτίς, (rhytis), "wrinkled," and φύλλον (phyllon), which means "leaf."

== Cultivation and uses ==
It is commonly grown as an ornamental plant for its evergreen foliage and tolerance of deep shade.
