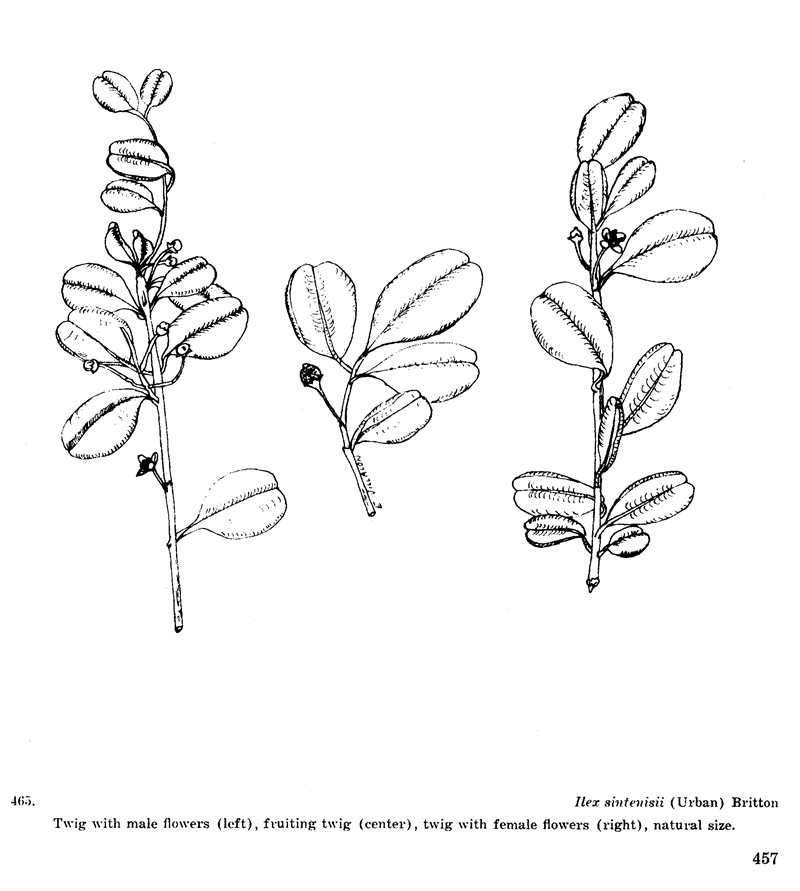

Conservation status
- Least Concern (IUCN 3.1)

Scientific classification
- Kingdom: Plantae
- Clade: Tracheophytes
- Clade: Angiosperms
- Clade: Eudicots
- Clade: Asterids
- Order: Aquifoliales
- Family: Aquifoliaceae
- Genus: Ilex
- Species: I. obcordata

Binomial name
- Ilex obcordata Sw.

Varieties
- Ilex obcordata var. obcordata; Ilex obcordata var. vaccinioides (Loes.) P.A.González

Synonyms
- of var. obcordata: Braxylis obcordata Raf.; Ilex cristalensis Loes.; Ilex cuneifolia Hook.; Ilex ekmaniana Loes.; Ilex ekmaniana var. regnelliana Loes.; Ilex formonica Loes.; Ilex shaferi Britton & P.Wilson; Ilex sintenisii (Urb.) Britton; Vaccinium sintenisii Urb.; of var. vaccinioides: Ilex vaccinioides Loes.

= Ilex obcordata =

Species of plant

Ilex obcordata is a species of holly in the family Aquifoliaceae. It is native to the Greater Antilles – Cuba, Hispaniola (the Dominican Republic and Haiti), Jamaica, and Puerto Rico.

There are two accepted varieties:

- Ilex obcordata var. obcordata – Cuba, Hispaniola, Jamaica, and Puerto Rico
- Ilex obcordata var. vaccinioides (Loes.) P.A.González – Jamaica and Puerto Rico

Some consider the Puerto Rican population a separate species, Ilex sintenisii (Urb.) Britton, while González-Gutiérrez (2007) and Plants of the World Online consider I. sintenisii to be a synonym of I. obcordata var. obcordata, which occurs on the islands of Cuba, Jamaica, and Hispaniola in addition to Puerto Rico.

There are only 150 individuals remaining in the Luquillo Mountains of Puerto Rico, restricted to Toro Negro State Forest.

The species is assessed as Least Concern by the IUCN Red List. The synonym Ilex sintenisii (Sintenis' holly or cuero de sapo) is assessed as Endangered by the IUCN, and is a federally listed endangered species of the United States.
