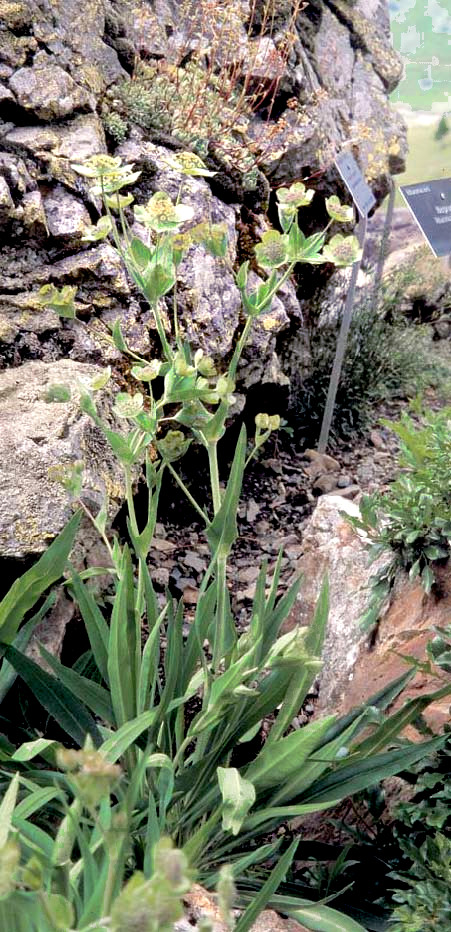

Scientific classification
- Kingdom: Plantae
- Clade: Tracheophytes
- Clade: Angiosperms
- Clade: Eudicots
- Clade: Asterids
- Order: Apiales
- Family: Apiaceae
- Genus: Bupleurum
- Species: B. angulosum

Binomial name
- Bupleurum angulosum L.

= Bupleurum angulosum =

Species of flowering plant

Bupleurum angulosum is a species of flowering plant in the family Apiaceae. It is endemic to the Pyrenees and the Cantabrian Mountains in Spain.
