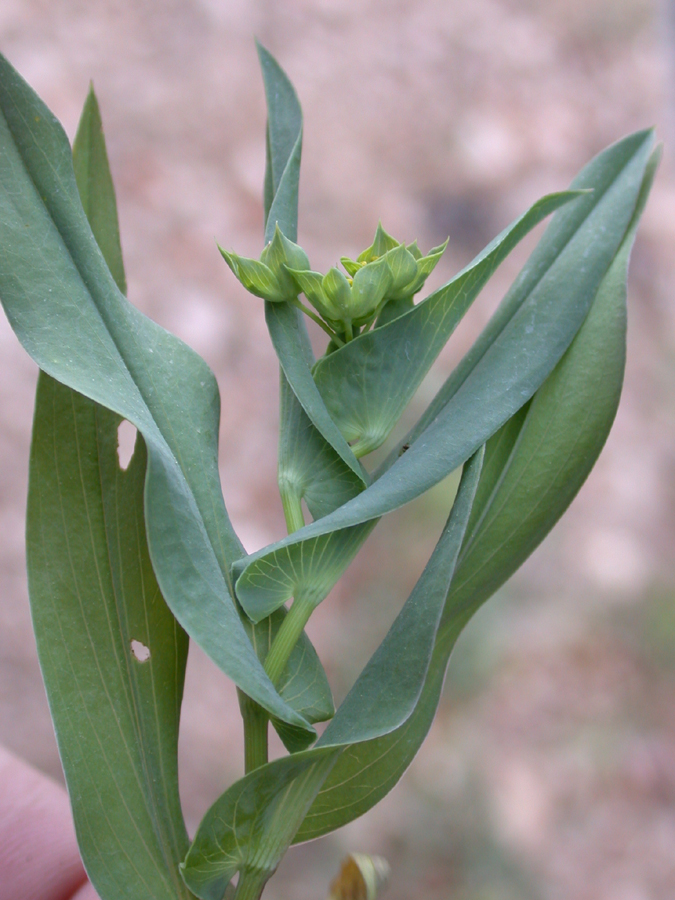

Scientific classification
- Kingdom: Plantae
- Clade: Tracheophytes
- Clade: Angiosperms
- Clade: Eudicots
- Clade: Asterids
- Order: Apiales
- Family: Apiaceae
- Genus: Bupleurum
- Species: B. lancifolium

Binomial name
- Bupleurum lancifolium Hornem.

Synonyms
- Bupleurum protractum Bupleurum subovatum

= Bupleurum lancifolium =

Species of flowering plant

Bupleurum lancifolium is a species of flowering plant in the family Apiaceae known by the common name lanceleaf thorow-wax. It is native to the Mediterranean Basin and it is known elsewhere, including parts of North America, as an introduced species. It grows up to 50 centimetres (20 in) tall with a hairless, waxy stem around which leaves are fused at their bases. The dull, waxy, deep-green leaves are narrowly lance-shaped to nearly oval and 3 to 10 centimetres (1.2 to 3.9 in) long. The inflorescence is a compound umbel borne on a peduncle which may be several centimeters tall. The umbel is surrounded by five wide, round to oval, and sometimes pointed bractlets at the base. The flowers are yellow to yellow-green.

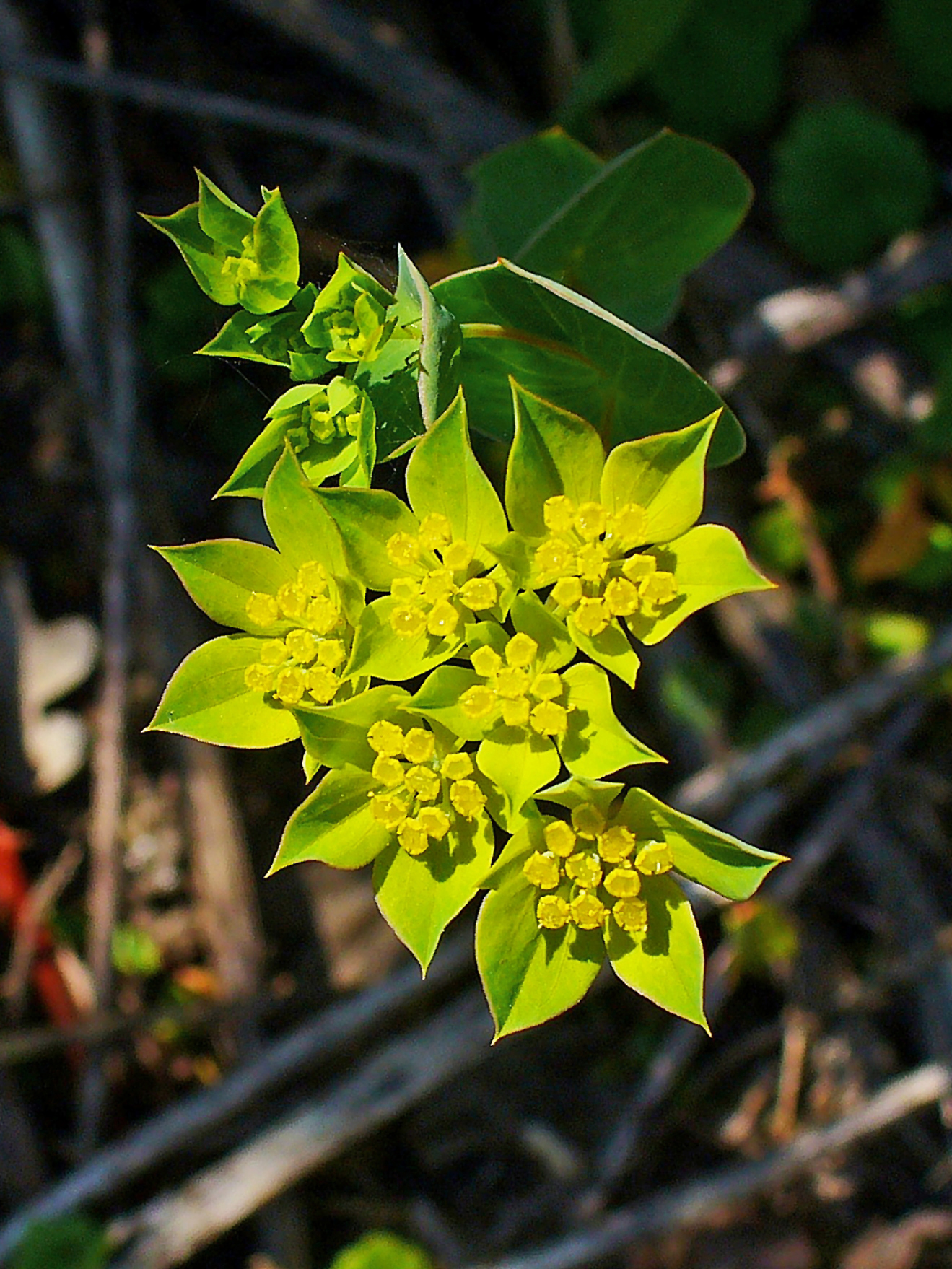
Bupleurum lancifolium inflorecence
