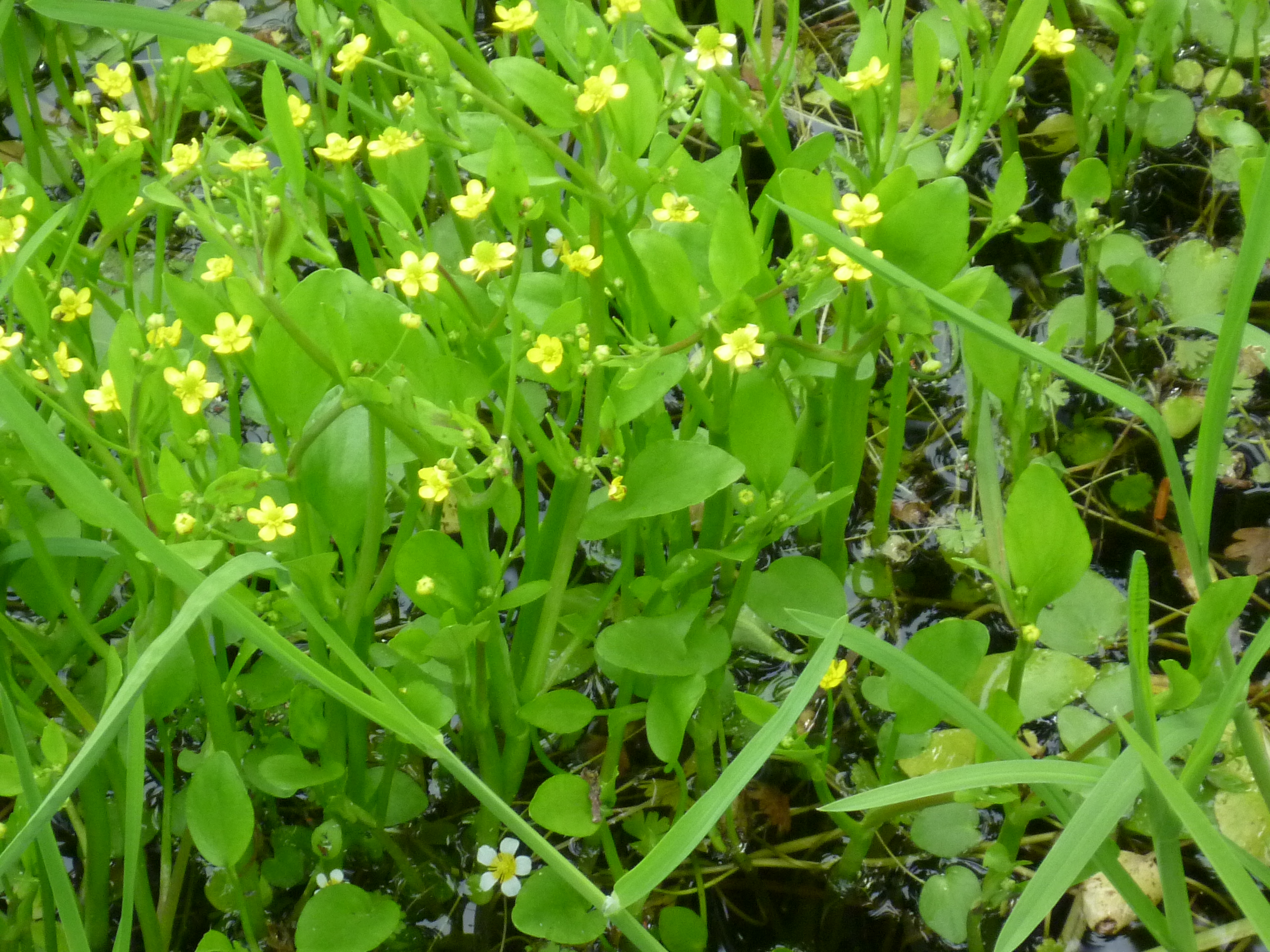

Scientific classification
- Kingdom: Plantae
- Clade: Tracheophytes
- Clade: Angiosperms
- Clade: Eudicots
- Order: Ranunculales
- Family: Ranunculaceae
- Genus: Ranunculus
- Species: R. ophioglossifolius

Binomial name
- Ranunculus ophioglossifolius Vill.

= Ranunculus ophioglossifolius =

Species of plant

Ranunculus ophioglossifolius, known as adder's-tongue spearwort, is a herbaceous plant in the family Ranunculaceae ("buttercup family"), with small, bright yellow, buttercup-like flowers.

== Distribution ==
Ranunculus ophioglossifolius is found widely in southern Europe (especially in Sardinia), North Africa (including Macaronesia) and western Asia. In 1957, it was introduced to New Zealand. In the British Isles, it is now restricted to two sites, and in Scandinavia, it is only found at a few sites on the island of Gotland.

== Status in Great Britain ==
Also known as the "Badgeworth buttercup", this plant has been the subject of considerable conservation effort from Gloucestershire Wildlife Trust and Plantlife. It is currently found in only two sites in the UK (Badgeworth and Inglestone Common), making it one of the rarest species of the country.

A historical timeline is published by the Gloucestershire Wildlife Trust:

- In 1789, adder's-tonguespearwort was first described by Dominique Villars in Histoire des plantes de Dauphiné.
- In June 1838, it was discovered in the Channel Islands at St Peter's Marsh on Jersey by Charles Cardale Babington.
- In 1843, Sowerby's English Botany included illustrations.
- Mentioned in 1846 by Edward Forbes in a classic article on a theory of floral distribution of the British Isles.
- In 1878 in England, a few specimens were found in a wet ditch at Hythe, Hampshire by Mr. H Groves (not fully identified until 1882).
- In 1884, the last known specimens were collected from St Peter's Marsh, Jersey and are in the Herbarium of Carlisle City Museum.
- In 1890, adder's-tongue spearwort was discovered at Cold Pool, Badgeworth by Mr. Buckell and Mrs. Frances Fawkes.
- In 1914, it was found in a wet meadow near Woodsford, Dorset by Professor R Good.
- In 1926, a second Gloucestershire site was found around a pond on Inglestone Common by Mrs C I Sandwith and Mr N Y Sandwith.
- In 1929, specimens were collected by Frere Louis-Arsene at Grouville, Jersey (later found to be adder's-tongue spearwort) and are now in the Herbarium at the Natural History Museum.
