= Bupleurum sintenisii =

Scientific classification
- Kingdom: Plantae
- Clade: Embryophytes
- Clade: Tracheophytes
- Clade: Spermatophytes
- Clade: Angiosperms
- Clade: Eudicots
- Clade: Asterids
- Order: Apiales
- Family: Apiaceae
- Genus: Bupleurum
- Species: B. sintenisii

Binomial name
- Bupleurum sintenisii Asch. & Urb. ex Huter

Synonyms
- Bupleurum rigoi Huter; Glochidopleurum sintenisii (Asch. & Urb. ex Huter) Koso-Pol.

Species of flowering plant

Bupleurum sintenisii is a species of flowering plant in the family Apiaceae. It is referred to by the common name dwarf hare's ear, and is an annual herb, 1–5 cm (0.4–2.0 in) high, hairless and glaucous. Leaves alternate, simple, entire, linear, 10–20 x 0.5–1.5 mm. The inconspicuous flowers are yellowish to brownish and crowded in umbels. Flowers from May to July. The fruit is a dry schizocarp, covered by hooded bristles.

== Habitat ==
It grows in dry rocky sites with sparse garigue vegetation at 100–200 m (330–660 ft) altitude.

== Distribution ==
It is endemic to Cyprus where it occurs around Nicosia (Athalassa) and the area Pergamos-Troulli. It has also been recorded in the Akhna area.
