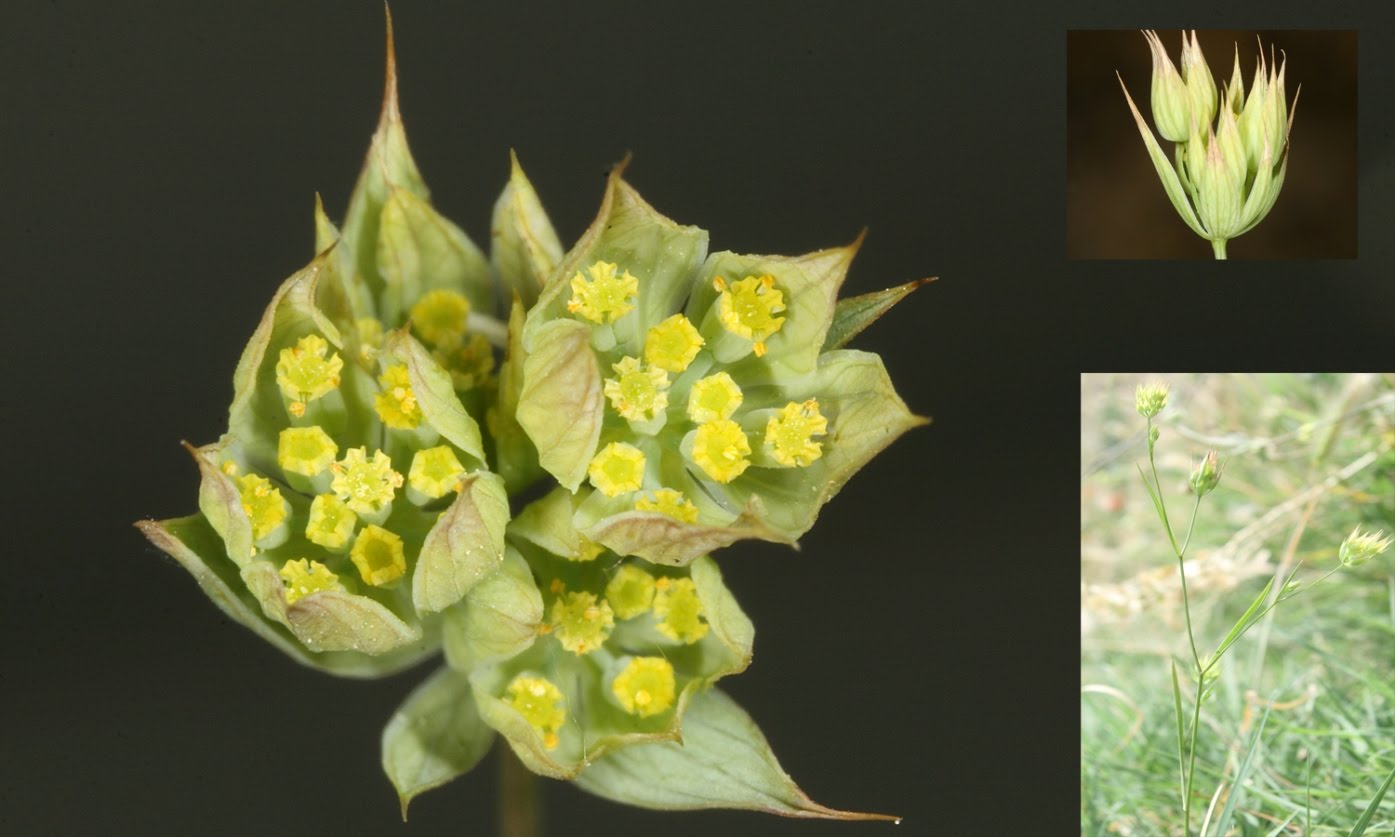

Scientific classification
- Kingdom: Plantae
- Clade: Tracheophytes
- Clade: Angiosperms
- Clade: Eudicots
- Clade: Asterids
- Order: Apiales
- Family: Apiaceae
- Genus: Bupleurum
- Species: B. baldense

Binomial name
- Bupleurum baldense Turra

= Bupleurum baldense =

Species of flowering plant

Bupleurum baldense, the small hare's ear, is a plant species of the genus Bupleurum.
