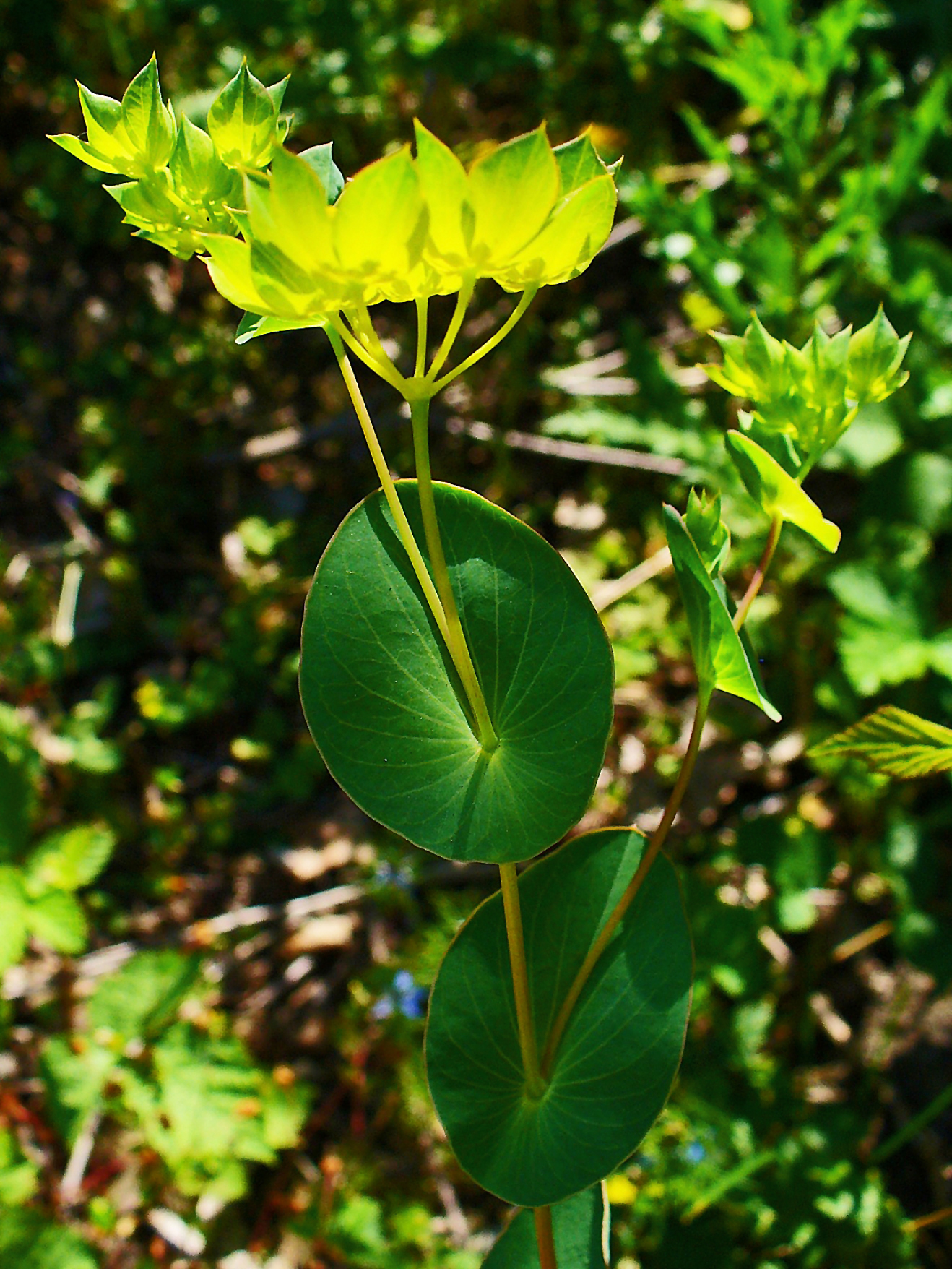

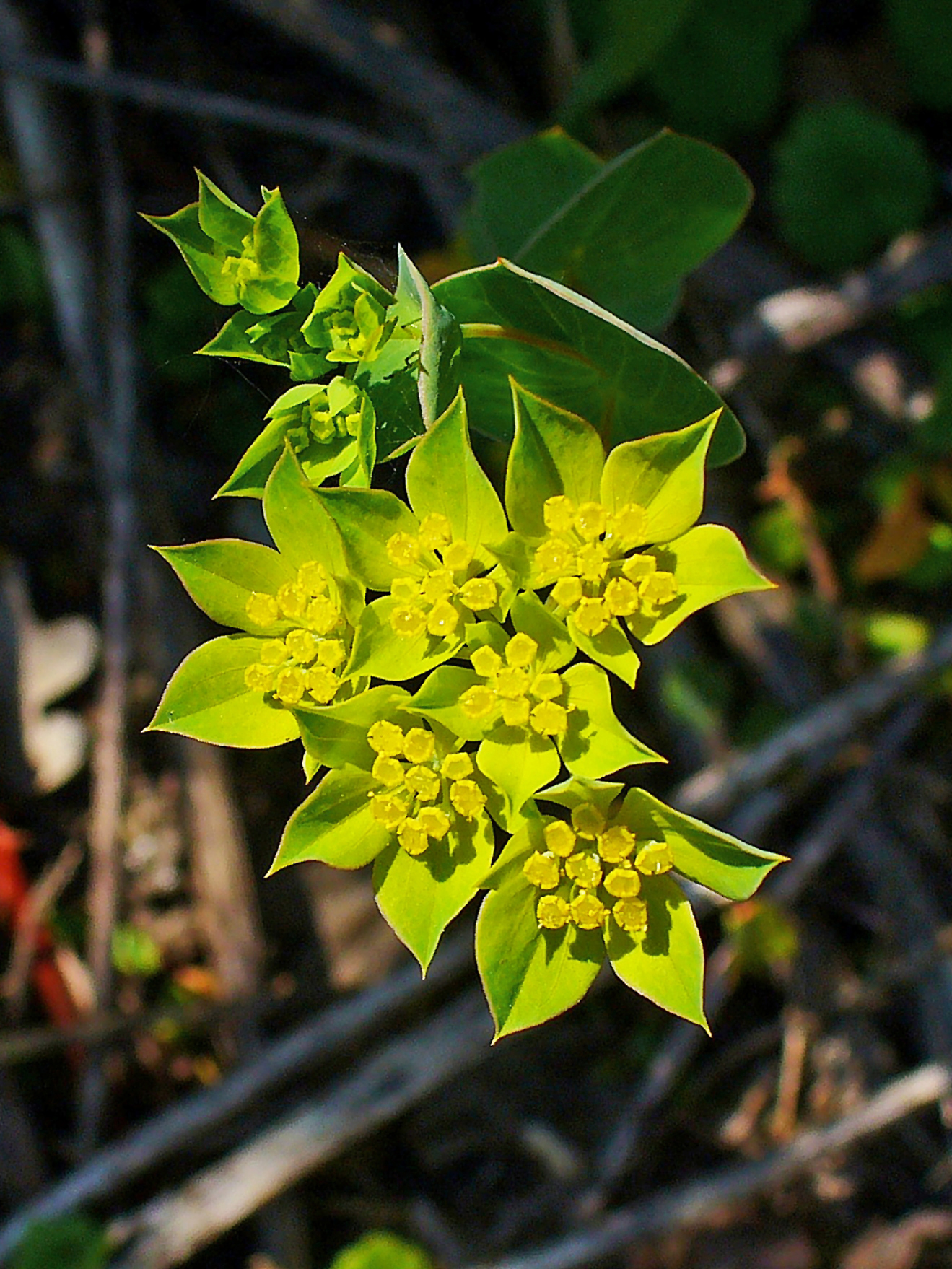
- Bupleurum rotundifolium

Scientific classification
- Kingdom: Plantae
- Clade: Embryophytes
- Clade: Tracheophytes
- Clade: Spermatophytes
- Clade: Angiosperms
- Clade: Eudicots
- Clade: Asterids
- Order: Apiales
- Family: Apiaceae
- Subfamily: Apioideae
- Tribe: Bupleureae
- Genus: Bupleurum; L.

Synonyms
- Buprestis Spreng.

= Bupleurum =

Genus of flowering plants in the celery family

Bupleurum is a large genus of annual or perennial herbs or woody shrubs, with about 190 species, belonging to the family Apiaceae. The full size of its species may vary between a few cm to up to 3 m high. Their compound umbels of small flowers are adorned with bracteoles that are sometimes large and may play a role in attracting pollinators. Rare among the Apiaceae are the simple leaves, bracts (if present), and bracteoles. The genus is almost exclusively native in the Old World Northern Hemisphere, with one species native to North America and one species native to southern Africa.

== Species ==
Species accepted by the Plants of the World Online as of December 2022:

- Bupleurum acutifolium Boiss.
- Bupleurum aeneum Boiss. & A.Huet
- Bupleurum aequiradiatum (H.Wolff) Snogerup & B.Snogerup
- Bupleurum affine Sadler
- Bupleurum aira Snogerup
- Bupleurum aitchisonii (Boiss.) H.Wolff
- Bupleurum alatum R.H.Shan & M.L.Sheh
- Bupleurum album Maire
- Bupleurum aleppicum Boiss.
- Bupleurum alpigenum Jord. & Fourr.
- Bupleurum americanum J.M.Coult. & Rose
- Bupleurum anatolicum Hub.-Mor. & Reese
- Bupleurum andhricum M.P.Nayar & R.N.Banerjee
- Bupleurum angulosum L.
- Bupleurum angustissimum (Franch.) Kitag.
- Bupleurum antonii Maire
- Bupleurum apiculatum Friv.
- Bupleurum asperuloides Heldr.
- Bupleurum atlanticum Murb.
- Bupleurum aureum Fisch. ex Hoffm.
- Bupleurum badachschanicum Lincz.
- Bupleurum baimaense X.G.Ma & X.J.He
- Bupleurum balansae Boiss. & Reut.
- Bupleurum baldense Turra
- Bupleurum barceloi Coss. ex Willk.
- Bupleurum benoistii Litard. & Maire
- Bupleurum bicaule Helm
- Bupleurum boissieri Post
- Bupleurum boissieuanum H.Wolff
- Bupleurum bourgaei Boiss. & Reut.
- Bupleurum brachiatum K.Koch ex Boiss.
- Bupleurum brevicaule Schltdl.
- Bupleurum canaliculatum Diels
- Bupleurum candollei Wall. ex DC.
- Bupleurum canescens Schousb.
- Bupleurum capillare Boiss. & Heldr.
- Bupleurum cappadocicum Boiss.
- Bupleurum chaishoui R.H.Shan & M.L.Sheh
- Bupleurum chevalieri Cherm.
- Bupleurum chinense DC.
- Bupleurum citrinum Hochst.
- Bupleurum clarkeanum (H.Wolff) Nasir
- Bupleurum commelynoideum H.Boissieu
- Bupleurum commutatum Boiss. & Balansa
- Bupleurum condensatum R.H.Shan & Y.Li
- Bupleurum constancei Nazir
- Bupleurum contractum Korovin
- Bupleurum croceum Fenzl
- Bupleurum dalhousianum (C.B.Clarke) Koso-Pol.
- Bupleurum davisii Snogerup
- Bupleurum densiflorum Rupr.
- Bupleurum dianthifolium Guss.
- Bupleurum dichotomum Boiss.
- Bupleurum dielsianum H.Wolff
- Bupleurum distichophyllum Wight & Arn.
- Bupleurum dracaenoides Huan C.Wang, Z.R.He & H.Sun
- Bupleurum dumosum Coss. & Balansa
- Bupleurum eginense (H.Wolff) Snogerup
- Bupleurum elatum Guss.
- Bupleurum erubescens Boiss.
- Bupleurum euboeum Beauverd & Topali
- Bupleurum euphorbioides Nakai
- Bupleurum exaltatum M.Bieb.
- Bupleurum falcatum L.
- Bupleurum faurelii Maire
- Bupleurum ferganense Lincz.
- Bupleurum flavicans Boiss. & Heldr.
- Bupleurum flavum Forssk.
- Bupleurum flexile Bornm. & Gauba
- Bupleurum foliosum Salzm. ex DC.
- Bupleurum freitagii Rech.f.
- Bupleurum fruticescens L.
- Bupleurum fruticosum L.
- Bupleurum gansuense S.L.Pan & P.S.Hsu
- Bupleurum gaudianum Snogerup
- Bupleurum gerardi All.
- Bupleurum ghahremanii Mozaff.
- Bupleurum gibraltaricum Lam.
- Bupleurum gilanicum Mozaff.
- Bupleurum gilesii H.Wolff
- Bupleurum glumaceum Sm.
- Bupleurum gracile d'Urv.
- Bupleurum gracilipes Diels
- Bupleurum gracillimum Klotzsch
- Bupleurum greuteri Snogerup
- Bupleurum gulczense O.Fedtsch. & B.Fedtsch.
- Bupleurum gussonei (Arcang.) Snogerup & B.Snogerup
- Bupleurum hakgalense Klack.
- Bupleurum hamiltonii N.P.Balakr.
- Bupleurum handiense (Bolle) G.Kunkel
- Bupleurum haussknechtii Boiss.
- Bupleurum heldreichii Boiss. & Balansa
- Bupleurum hoffmeisteri Klotzsch
- Bupleurum imaicola J.Kern.
- Bupleurum isphairamicum Pimenov
- Bupleurum jucundum Kurz
- Bupleurum kabulicum Rech.f.
- Bupleurum kakiskalae Greuter
- Bupleurum kaoi Liu, C.Y.Chao & Chuang
- Bupleurum karglii Vis.
- Bupleurum khasianum (Clarke) P.K.Mukh.
- Bupleurum koechelii Fenzl
- Bupleurum kohistanicum Nasir
- Bupleurum komarovianum Lincz.
- Bupleurum kosopolianskyi Grossh.
- Bupleurum krylovianum Schischk.
- Bupleurum kunmingense Yin Li & S.L.Pan
- Bupleurum kurdicum Boiss.
- Bupleurum kurzii P.K.Mukh.
- Bupleurum kweichowense R.H.Shan
- Bupleurum lanceolatum Wall. ex DC.
- Bupleurum lancifolium Hornem.
- Bupleurum lateriflorum Coss.
- Bupleurum latissimum Nakai
- Bupleurum leucocladum Boiss.
- Bupleurum libanoticum Boiss. & C.I.Blanche
- Bupleurum linczevskii Pimenov & Sdobnina
- Bupleurum lipskyanum (Koso-Pol.) Lincz.
- Bupleurum longeradiatum Turcz.
- Bupleurum longicaule Wall. ex DC.
- Bupleurum longifolium L.
- Bupleurum lophocarpum Boiss. & Balansa
- Bupleurum luxiense Yin Li & S.L.Pan
- Bupleurum lycaonicum Snogerup
- Bupleurum maddenii C.B.Clarke
- Bupleurum malconense R.H.Shan & Y.Li
- Bupleurum marginatum Wall. ex DC.
- Bupleurum marschallianum C.A.Mey.
- Bupleurum martjanovii Krylov
- Bupleurum mayeri Micevski
- Bupleurum mesatlanticum Litard. & Maire
- Bupleurum microcephalum Diels
- Bupleurum miyamorii Kitag.
- Bupleurum mongolicum V.M.Vinogr.
- Bupleurum montanum Coss. & Durieu
- Bupleurum multinerve DC.
- Bupleurum mundii Cham. & Schltdl.
- Bupleurum muschleri H.Wolff
- Bupleurum nanum Poir.
- Bupleurum nematocladum Rech.f.
- Bupleurum nigrescens Nasir
- Bupleurum nipponicum Koso-Pol.
- Bupleurum nodiflorum Sm.
- Bupleurum nordmannianum Ledeb.
- Bupleurum odontites L.
- Bupleurum oligactis Boiss.
- Bupleurum orientale Snogerup
- Bupleurum pachnospermum Pančić
- Bupleurum pamiricum Pimenov & Kljuykov
- Bupleurum papillosum DC.
- Bupleurum pauciradiatum Fenzl ex Boiss.
- Bupleurum pendikum Snogerup
- Bupleurum persicum Boiss.
- Bupleurum petiolulatum Franch.
- Bupleurum petraeum L.
- Bupleurum plantagineum Desf.
- Bupleurum plantaginifolium Wight
- Bupleurum polyactis Post ex Snogerup
- Bupleurum polyclonum Yin Li & S.L.Pan
- Bupleurum polyphyllum Ledeb.
- Bupleurum postii H.Wolff
- Bupleurum praealtum L.
- Bupleurum pulchellum Boiss. & Heldr.
- Bupleurum qinghaiense Yin Li & J.X.Guo
- Bupleurum ramosissimum Wight & Arn.
- Bupleurum ranunculoides L.
- Bupleurum regelii Lincz. & V.M.Vinogr.
- Bupleurum rigidum L.
- Bupleurum rischawianum Albov
- Bupleurum rockii H.Wolff
- Bupleurum rollii (Montel.) Pignatti
- Bupleurum rosulare Korovin ex Pimenov & Sdobnina
- Bupleurum rotundifolium L.
- Bupleurum rupestre Edgew.
- Bupleurum sachalinense F.Schmidt
- Bupleurum salicifolium R.Br.
- Bupleurum schistosum Woronow
- Bupleurum scorzonerifolium Willd.
- Bupleurum semicompositum L.
- Bupleurum setaceum Fenzl
- Bupleurum shanianum X.G.Ma & X.J.He
- Bupleurum shikotanense M.Hiroe
- Bupleurum sibiricum Vest ex Spreng.
- Bupleurum sikkimensis P.K.Mukh.
- Bupleurum sintenisii Asch. & Urb. ex Huter
- Bupleurum × sitenskyi Šourková
- Bupleurum smithii H.Wolff
- Bupleurum sosnowskyi Manden.
- Bupleurum spinosum Gouan
- Bupleurum stellatum L.
- Bupleurum stenophyllum (Nakai) Kitag.
- Bupleurum stewartianum Nasir
- Bupleurum subnivale (Galushko) Galushko
- Bupleurum subovatum Link ex Spreng.
- Bupleurum subspinosum Maire & Weiller
- Bupleurum subuniflorum Boiss. & Heldr.
- Bupleurum sulphureum Boiss. & Balansa
- Bupleurum swatianum Nasir
- Bupleurum tenuissimum L.
- Bupleurum terminum A.P.Khokhr.
- Bupleurum thianschanicum Freyn
- Bupleurum thomsonii C.B.Clarke
- Bupleurum trichopodum Boiss. & Spruner
- Bupleurum triradiatum Adams ex Hoffm.
- Bupleurum turcicum Snogerup
- Bupleurum tuschkanczik Stepanov
- Bupleurum veronense Turra
- Bupleurum virgatum Cav.
- Bupleurum wenchuanense R.H.Shan & Y.Li
- Bupleurum wittmannii Steven
- Bupleurum wolffianum Bornm. ex H.Wolff
- Bupleurum woronowii Manden.
- Bupleurum yinchowense R.H.Shan & Y.Li
- Bupleurum yunnanense Franch.
- Bupleurum zoharii Snogerup
