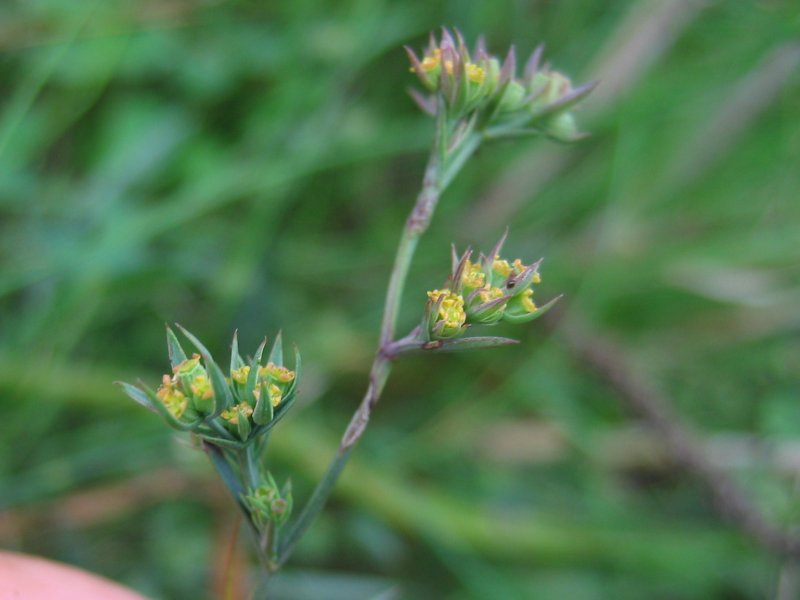

Scientific classification
- Kingdom: Plantae
- Clade: Tracheophytes
- Clade: Angiosperms
- Clade: Eudicots
- Clade: Asterids
- Order: Apiales
- Family: Apiaceae
- Genus: Bupleurum
- Species: B. tenuissimum

Binomial name
- Bupleurum tenuissimum L.

= Bupleurum tenuissimum =

Species of flowering plant

Bupleurum tenuissimum, the slender hare's-ear, is a coastal plant of the family Apiaceae.
