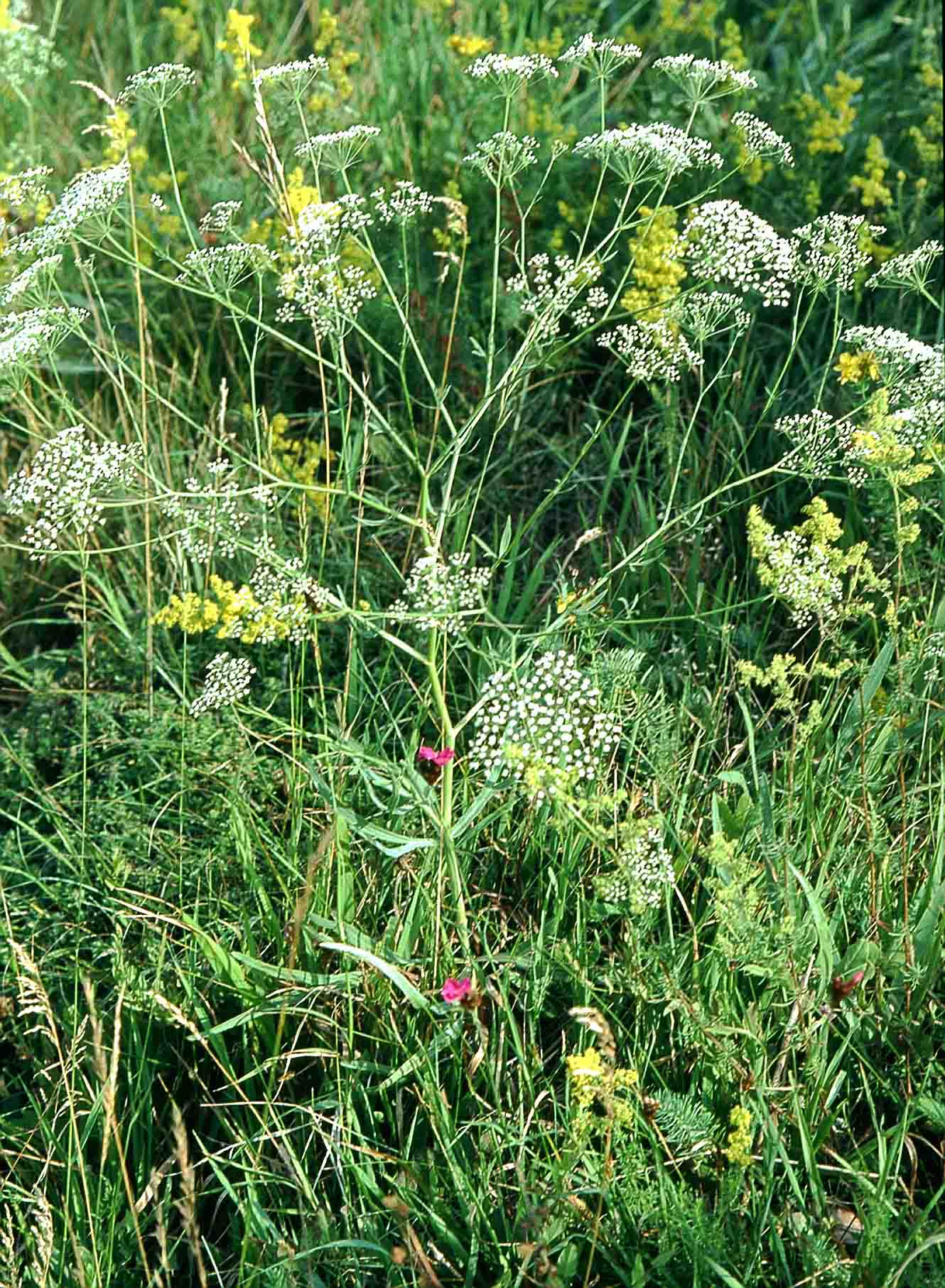

Scientific classification
- Kingdom: Plantae
- Clade: Tracheophytes
- Clade: Angiosperms
- Clade: Eudicots
- Clade: Asterids
- Order: Apiales
- Family: Apiaceae
- Subfamily: Apioideae
- Tribe: Careae
- Genus: Falcaria; Fabr.
- Species: F. vulgaris

Binomial name
- Falcaria vulgaris Bernh.

= Falcaria vulgaris =

Species of flowering plant

Falcaria vulgaris, the sickleweed or longleaf, is the sole species in the genus Falcaria. It is a biennial herb of the spherical shape. Blossoms in June–July. Grows in Europe, Siberia, Middle East, Northern Africa, North and South Americas. Contains alkaloids, carotene, vitamin C, proteins.

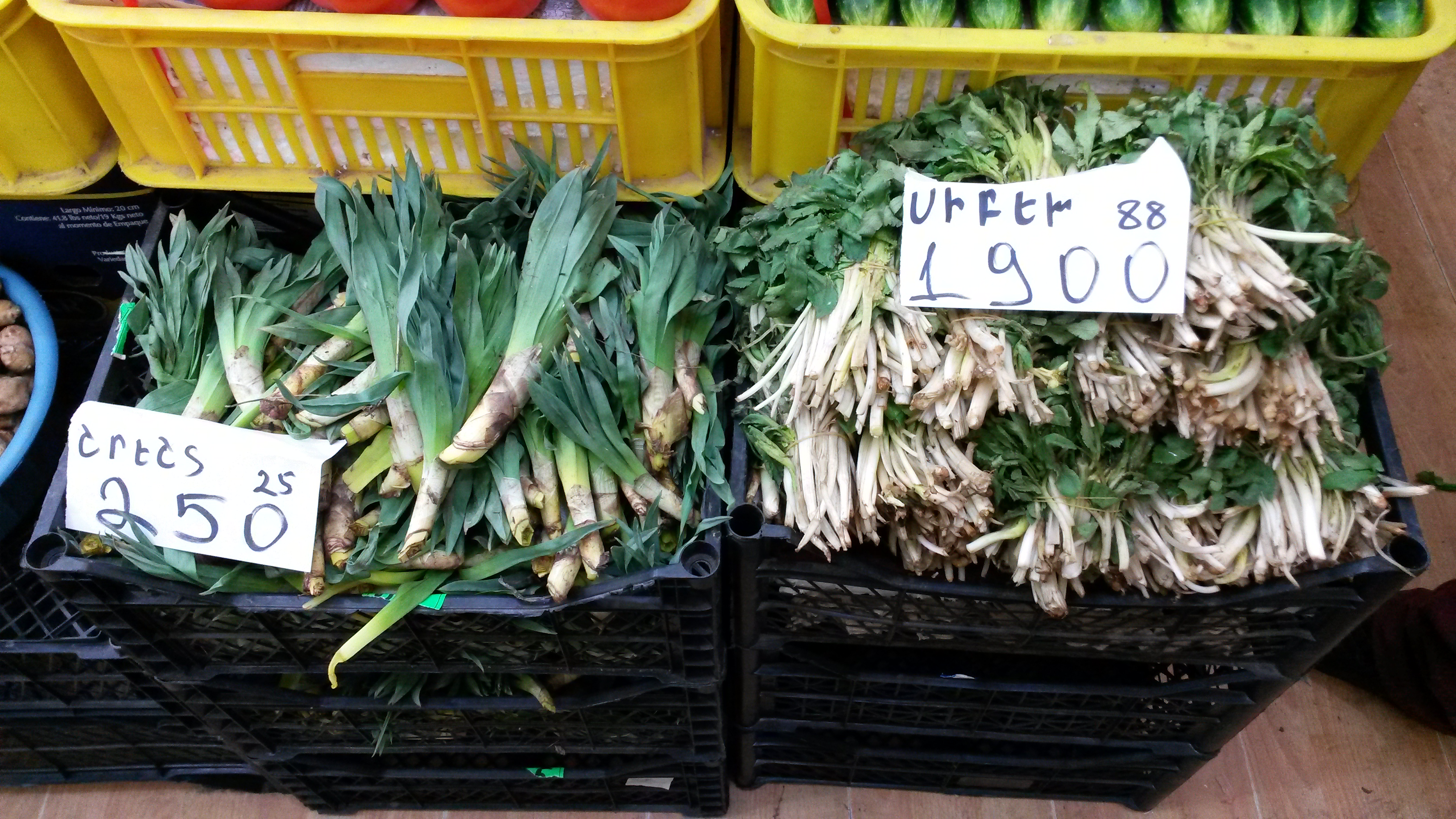
Eremurus and falcaria leaves are consumed as food in Armenia

Its use as an alternative medicine may offer several advantages, especially in the treatment of stomach and skin ulcers, diabetes, infections, and liver and kidney disorders.
