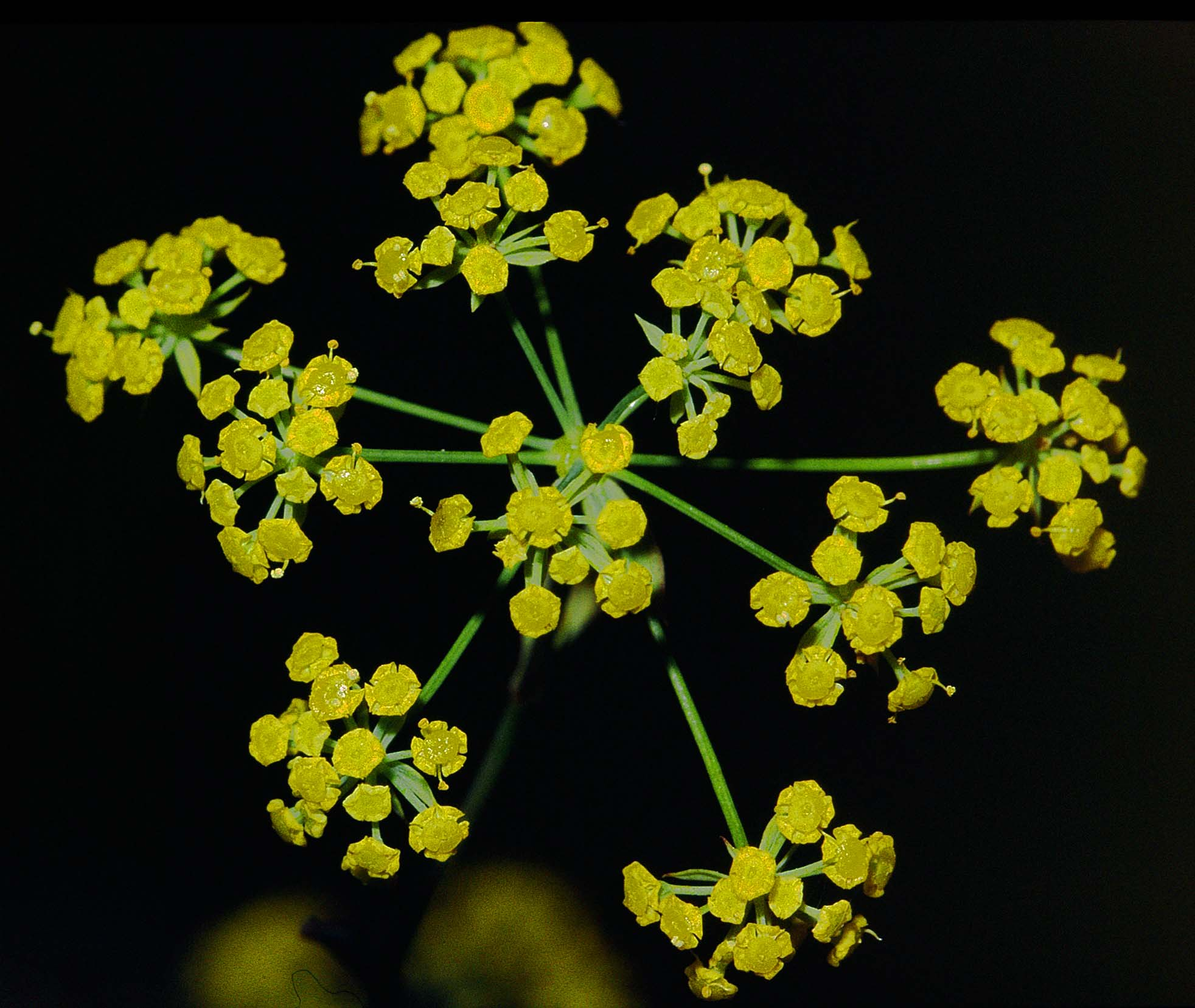

Scientific classification
- Kingdom: Plantae
- Clade: Tracheophytes
- Clade: Angiosperms
- Clade: Eudicots
- Clade: Asterids
- Order: Apiales
- Family: Apiaceae
- Genus: Bupleurum
- Species: B. falcatum

Binomial name
- Bupleurum falcatum L.

= Bupleurum falcatum =

Species of flowering plant

Bupleurum falcatum, the sickle-leaved hare's-ear, sickle hare's ear or sickle-leaf hare's ear, is a species of flowering plant in the family Apiaceae.

It is found in Europe and the Caucasus.

In East Asia, the scientific name Bupleurum falcatum is often misapplied to another species, Bupleurum stenophyllum.

Bupleurum falcatum has been found to possess antidepressant properties, mediated through the serotonergic and noradrenergic systems (although the precise mechanism remains to be found).

== Subspecies ==
Three subspecies are accepted.

- Bupleurum falcatum subsp. corsicum (Coss. & Kralik) Rouy & E.G.Camus – Corsica
- Bupleurum falcatum subsp. dilatatum (Schur) Soó – Slovakia, Hungary, and Romania
- Bupleurum falcatum subsp. falcatum – France to the Caucasus and eastern European Russia
