= Bupleurum scorzonerifolium =

Scientific classification
- Kingdom: Plantae
- Clade: Tracheophytes
- Clade: Angiosperms
- Clade: Eudicots
- Clade: Asterids
- Order: Apiales
- Family: Apiaceae
- Genus: Bupleurum
- Species: B. scorzonerifolium

Binomial name
- Bupleurum scorzonerifolium Willd.

Synonyms
- Bupleurum falcatum var. komarovii Koso-Pol.; Bupleurum falcatum subf. latum H.Wolff; Bupleurum falcatum var. longipedunculatum H.Boissieu; Bupleurum falcatum subf. longipedunculatum (H.Boissieu) H.Wolff; Bupleurum falcatum f. normale H.Wolff; Bupleurum falcatum f. scorzonerifolium (Willd.) Regel; Bupleurum falcatum var. scorzonerifolium (Willd.) Ledeb.; Bupleurum falcatum subsp. scorzonerifolium (Willd.) Koso-Pol.; Bupleurum scorzonerifolium f. latum Nakai; Bupleurum scorzonerifolium f. longiradiatum R.H.Shan & Y.Li; Bupleurum scorzonerifolium f. pauciflorum R.H.Shan & Y.Li; Bupleurum sinensium Gand.

Species of plant

Bupleurum scorzonerifolium is a species of Bupleurum native to China, Siberia, Russian Far East, Korea, and Japan. Its root is used in traditional Chinese medicine known as Radix Bupleuri (柴胡).
