= Bupleurum chinense =

Scientific classification
- Kingdom: Plantae
- Clade: Tracheophytes
- Clade: Angiosperms
- Clade: Eudicots
- Clade: Asterids
- Order: Apiales
- Family: Apiaceae
- Genus: Bupleurum
- Species: B. chinense

Binomial name
- Bupleurum chinense DC.

Species of flowering plant

Bupleurum chinense (Chai Hu, Chinese: 柴胡; pinyin: chaí hú; Jyutping: caai^{4} wu^{4}, Thorowax) is a plant of the family Apiaceae.

== Distribution and appearance ==
Bupleurum chinense is native to East Asia. The leaves of the plant are long and thin and resemble fennel.

== Use in traditional Chinese medicine ==
The root of B. chinense, known as Radix Bupleuri, is used in traditional Chinese medicine. It has a large number of uses in Chinese medicine, including the application for liver issues.

There is evidence that Chinese herbal medicines, including those derived from B. chinense, is potentially beneficial in treating fatty liver disease through a variety of different observed pathways. The safety of this particular herb is well established and known through several thousand years of use, and millions of patients who have taken this medicinal compound for different medical issues.

== Chemical constituents ==
Bupleurum chinense roots, also known as Radix Bupleuri, contain polyacetylenes and saponins/triterpenoids.
