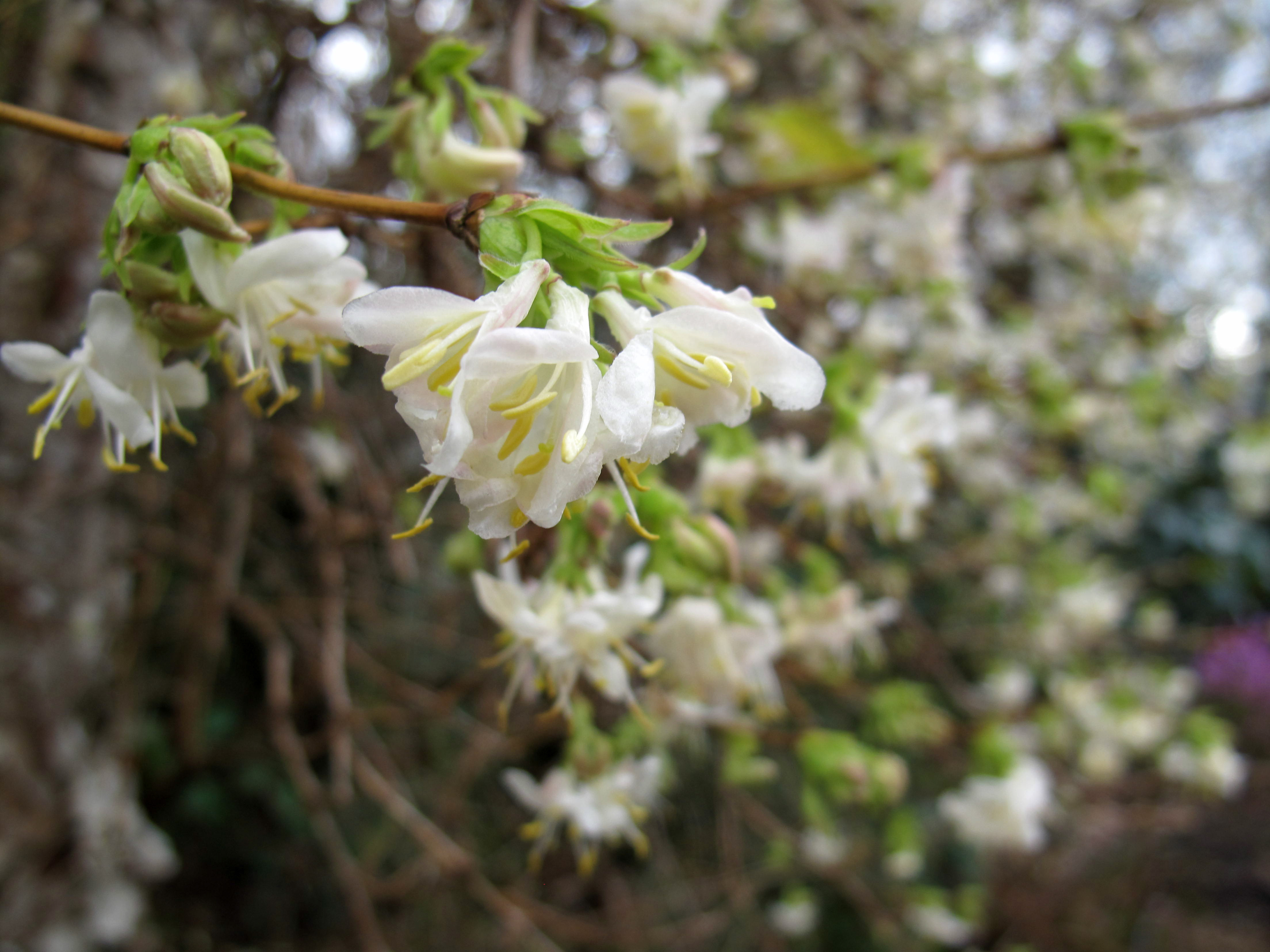

Scientific classification
- Kingdom: Plantae
- Clade: Tracheophytes
- Clade: Angiosperms
- Clade: Eudicots
- Clade: Asterids
- Order: Dipsacales
- Family: Caprifoliaceae
- Genus: Lonicera
- Species: L. × purpusii

Binomial name
- Lonicera × purpusii Rehder (1923)

= Lonicera × purpusii =

Species of honeysuckle

Lonicera × purpusii, the Purpus honeysuckle, is a hybrid species of flowering plant in the family Caprifoliaceae. It originated as a cross of garden origin between two Chinese species, L. fragrantissima and L. standishii.

Growing to 2.5 m (8.2 ft) tall and broad, it is a somewhat untidy shrub with ovate leaves and small paired cream/yellow flowers in winter. The flowers are strongly fragrant with the typical honeysuckle scent. It is extremely hardy, tolerating temperatures down to −20 °C (−4 °F) and a wide range of conditions. In a favourable environment it may be evergreen but is otherwise deciduous. In the latter case, the flowers are borne on the bare branches.

The widely grown cultivar 'Winter Beauty' is a recipient of the Royal Horticultural Society's Award of Garden Merit. It flowers best in full sun.
