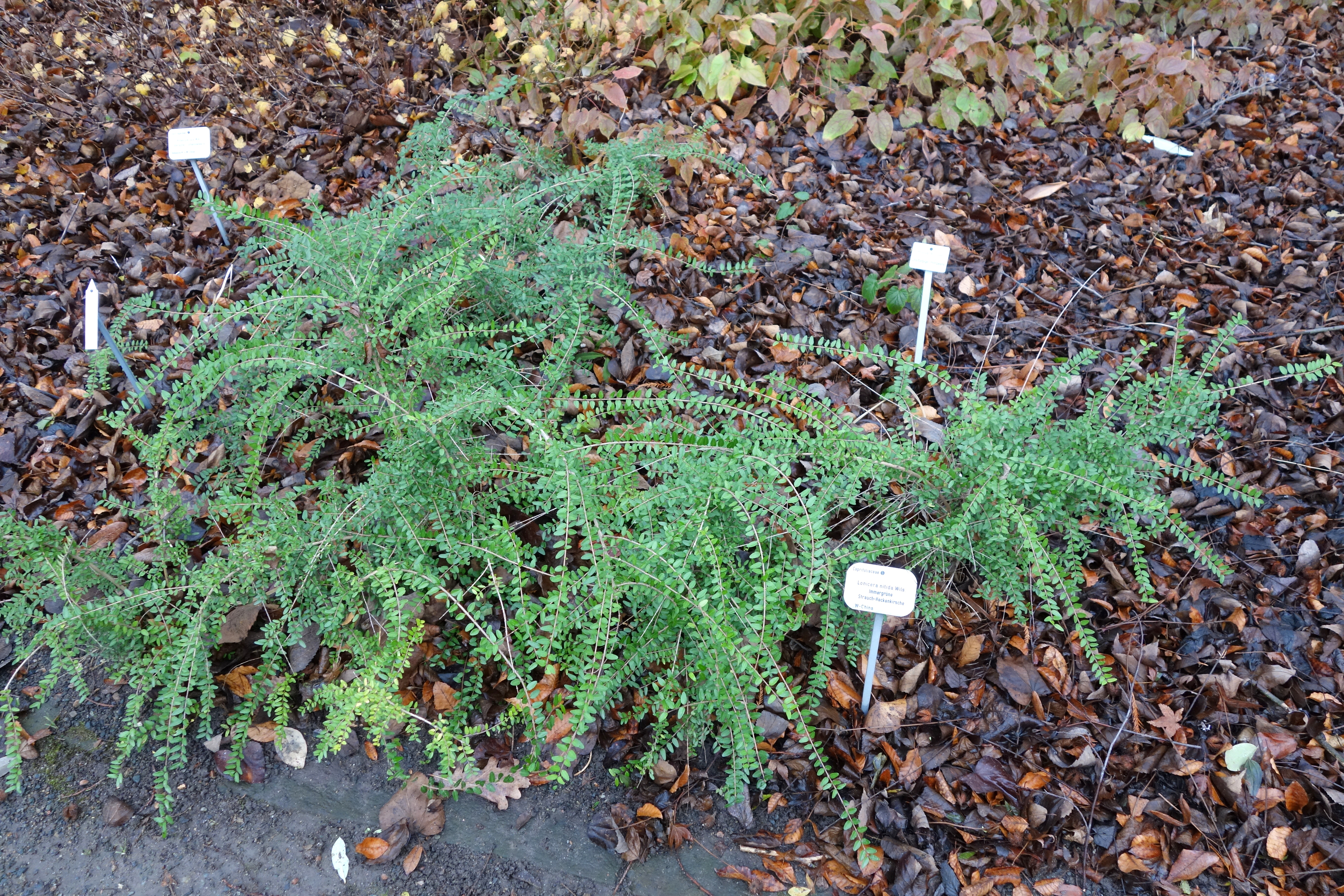
- Lonicera ligustrina var. yunnanensis Franch.

Scientific classification
- Kingdom: Plantae
- Clade: Tracheophytes
- Clade: Angiosperms
- Clade: Eudicots
- Clade: Asterids
- Order: Dipsacales
- Family: Caprifoliaceae
- Genus: Lonicera
- Species: L. ligustrina

Binomial name
- Lonicera ligustrina Wall. (1824)

Varieties
- Lonicera ligustrina var. ligustrina; Lonicera ligustrina var. pileata (Oliv.) Franch.; Lonicera ligustrina var. yunnanensis Franch.

Synonyms
- Xylosteon ligustrinum (Wall.) D.Don (1825)

= Lonicera ligustrina =

Species of honeysuckle

Lonicera ligustrina (女贞叶忍冬, nü zhen ye ren dong), the privet-like honeysuckle, is a species of honeysuckle found in the central and eastern Himalayas of Bhutan, India, Nepal, and in southern and central China. It grows as an evergreen, semi-evergreen, or deciduous shrub approximately 1.5-2.5 meters in height, with leathery or paper-like leaves 0.4-8 × 0.2-1.5 cm in size.

== Varieties ==
Three varieties are accepted.

- Lonicera ligustrina var. ligustrina (synonyms Lonicera buxifolia H.Lév., Lonicera missionis H.Lév., Lonicera virgultorum W.W.Sm., and Lonicera wightiana Wall.) – central and eastern Himalayas and southern China.
- Lonicera ligustrina var. pileata (Oliv.) Franch. (synonym Lonicera pileata Oliv.) – central and southern China
- Lonicera ligustrina var. yunnanensis Franch. (synonym Lonicera nitida E.H.Wilson) – central China. The cultivar 'Baggesen's Gold' has received the Royal Horticultural Society's Award of Garden Merit.
