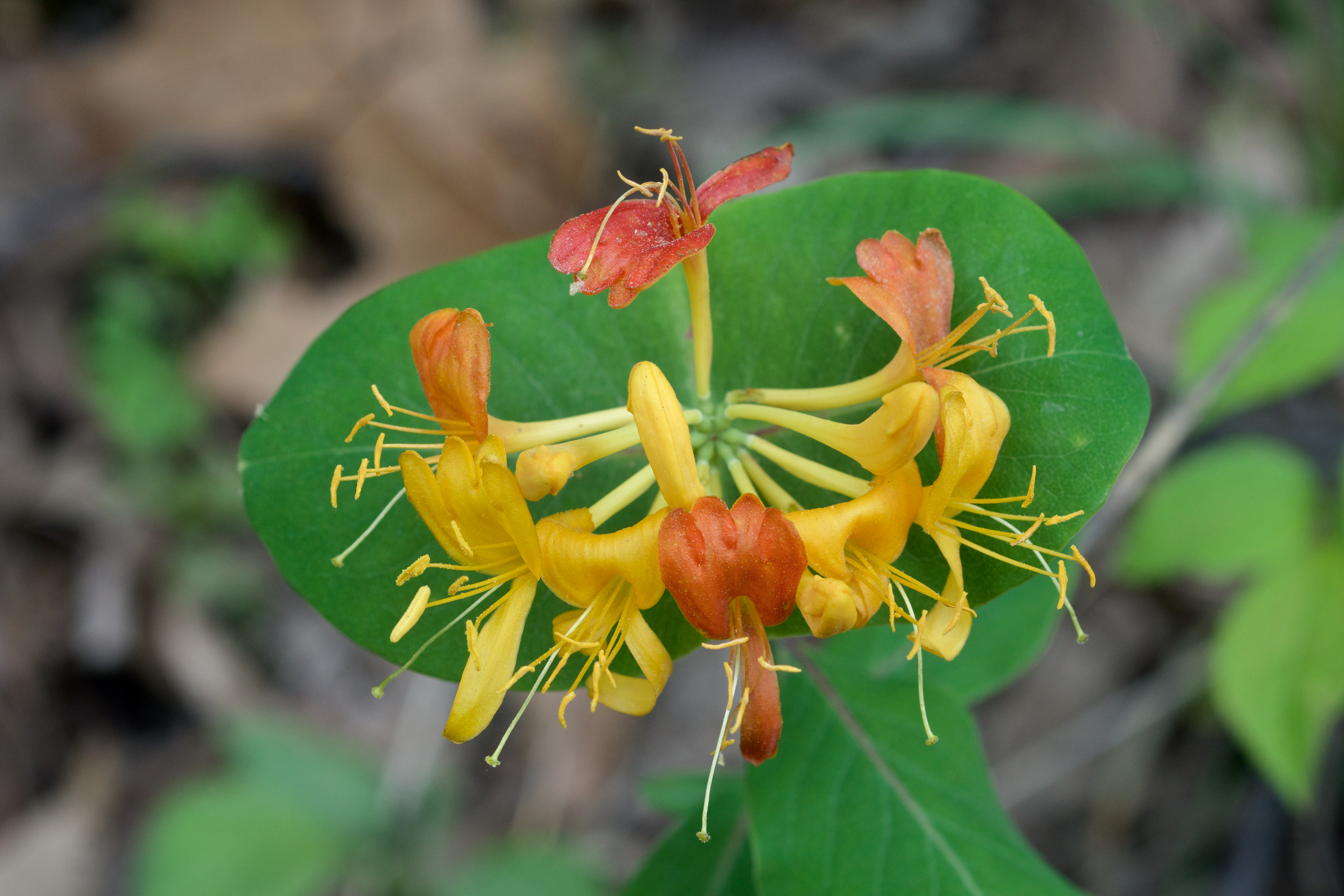

Conservation status
- Secure (NatureServe)

Scientific classification
- Kingdom: Plantae
- Clade: Tracheophytes
- Clade: Angiosperms
- Clade: Eudicots
- Clade: Asterids
- Order: Dipsacales
- Family: Caprifoliaceae
- Genus: Lonicera
- Species: L. flava

Binomial name
- Lonicera flava Sims

= Lonicera flava =

Species of honeysuckle native to the eastern United States

Lonicera flava (commonly known as yellow honeysuckle) is a species of honeysuckle native to the central and eastern United States. It is a woody vine with yellow-orange flowers that are slightly fragrant.

== Description ==
Lonicera flava is a vine that twines or climbs on other vegetation or structures or trails along the ground, with a length up to about 4 m (13 ft). Its gray bark becomes shredded as it ages. Leaves are simple with smooth margins and opposite, measuring 3–9 cm (1.2–3.5 in) long and 2–6.5 cm (0.8–2.6 in) wide. They are elliptic in shape, and the uppermost 1 or 2 pairs of leaves are fused around the stem (perfoliate). The upper surface of the leaves is bright green, and the underside is paler green or gray.

The flowers are yellow to orange, growing in terminal clusters. They are tubular and about 2.5 cm (1 in) long and have protruding stamens. The fruit is a red or reddish-orange berry.

== Etymology ==
The genus name Lonicera honors the German physician and botanist Adam Lonitzer (1528 – 1586), and the specific epithet flava is Latin for "yellow".

== Distribution and habitat ==
L. flava is native in the United States in Alabama, Arkansas, Georgia, Illinois, Kansas, Kentucky, Missouri, North Carolina, Ohio, Oklahoma, South Carolina, and Tennessee. The plant grows in dry to mesic upland woods and forests, along stream banks, on bluffs, and at the margins of glades.

== Ecology ==
The flowers bloom April to May, and the berries appear August to September. Hummingbirds and butterflies are attracted to the flowers, and birds and small mammals eat the berries.
