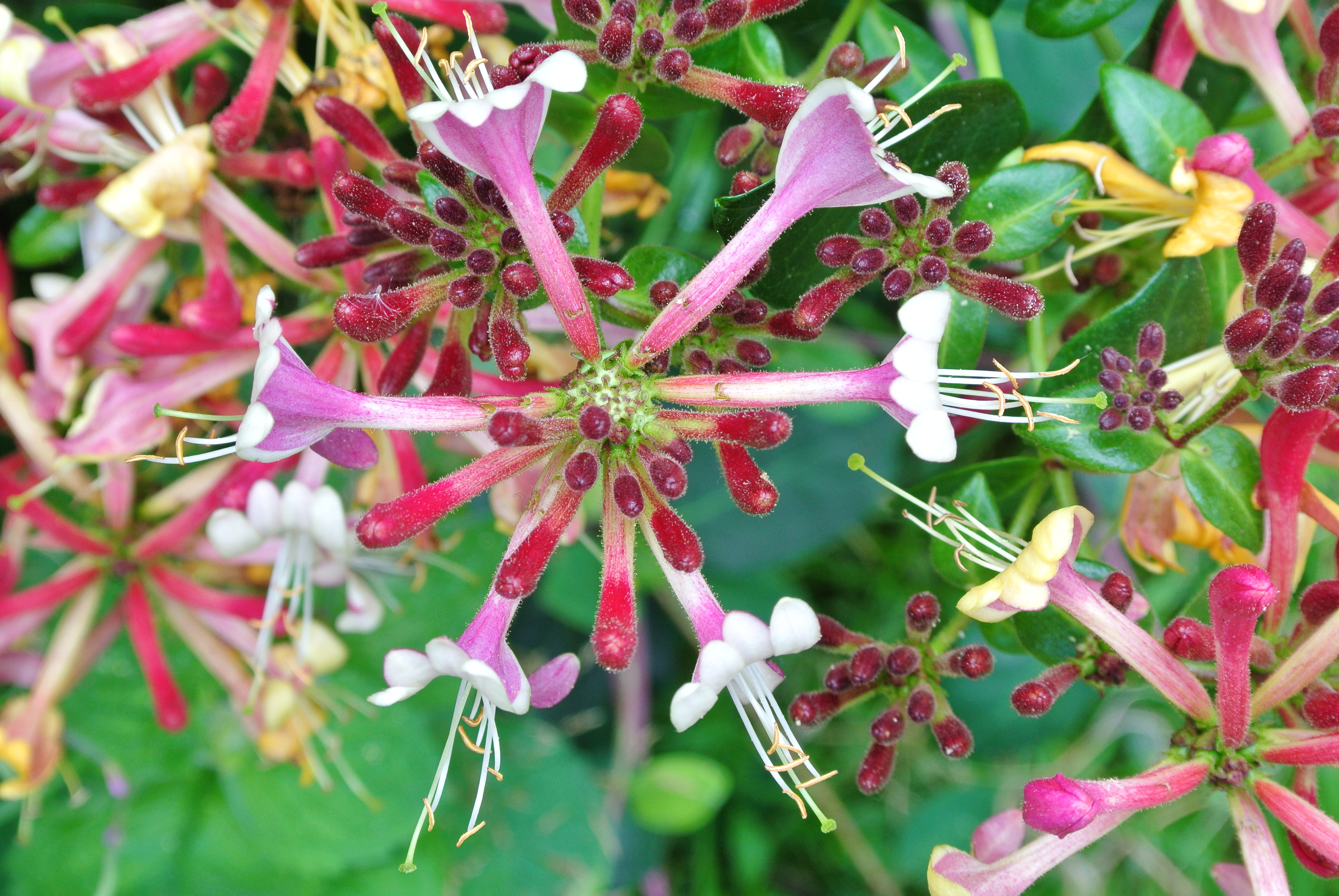

Scientific classification
- Kingdom: Plantae
- Clade: Tracheophytes
- Clade: Angiosperms
- Clade: Eudicots
- Clade: Asterids
- Order: Dipsacales
- Family: Caprifoliaceae
- Genus: Lonicera
- Species: L. × heckrottii

Binomial name
- Lonicera × heckrottii Rehder

= Lonicera × heckrottii =

Species of honeysuckle

Lonicera × heckrottii, the golden flame honeysuckle, is a plant in the honeysuckle family, Caprifoliaceae, grown in gardens for its showy flowers and long season of bloom.

== Description ==
Lonicera × heckrottii is a vine with opposite, simple leaves, on twining stems. They have fragrant pink to yellow flowers. Lonicera x heckrotti is believed to be a hybrid of Lonicera sempervirens and Lonicera x americana.
