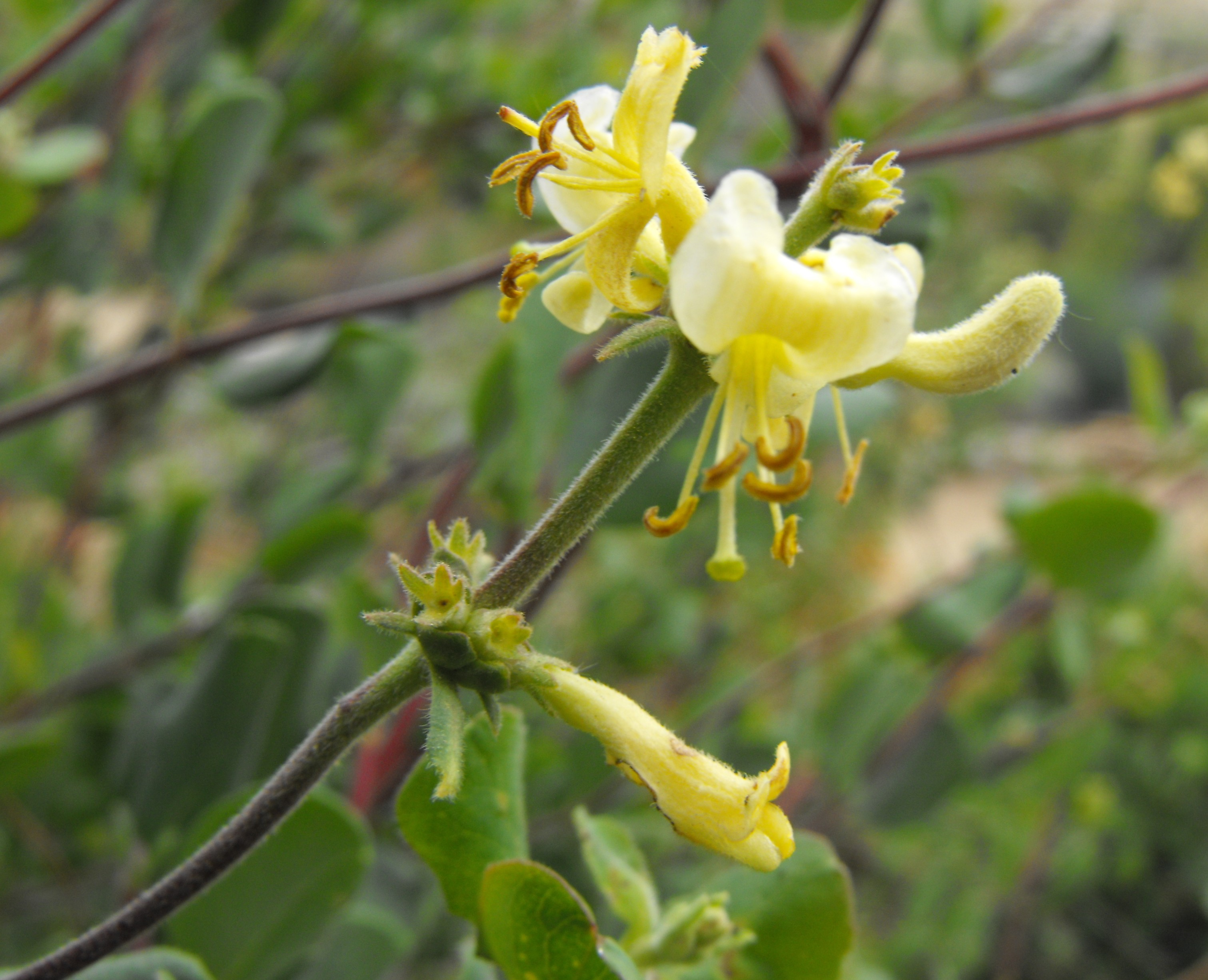

Conservation status
- Secure (NatureServe)

Scientific classification
- Kingdom: Plantae
- Clade: Tracheophytes
- Clade: Angiosperms
- Clade: Eudicots
- Clade: Asterids
- Order: Dipsacales
- Family: Caprifoliaceae
- Genus: Lonicera
- Species: L. subspicata

Binomial name
- Lonicera subspicata Hook. & Arn.

= Lonicera subspicata =

Species of honeysuckle

Lonicera subspicata is a species of honeysuckle known by the common name southern honeysuckle. It is native to Baja California, California, and northern Baja California Sur, where it is known from several areas in mountain and coastal habitat, particularly chaparral. It is a vining shrub which usually climbs on other plants for support.

== Description ==
This plant grows twining or reclining on shrubs, and may reach 9 to 24 decimeters in length. The herbage is glabrous to puberulent. The leaves are generally 1 to 4 cm long, with the base of the leaf blade round or more or less tapered, and the tip of the leaf shaped round or obtuse. Upper pairs are not fused around the stem. The inflorescence is a long, fuzzy spike of light yellow flowers each about a centimeter long. The flower has an upper and lower lip with hairy stamens and style protruding. The corolla is 8 to 12 mm long, colored pale yellow, and often hairy. The fruit is around 8 mm in size, and is a red or yellow berry.

== Subdivisions ==
=== var. denudata ===
Rehder Johnston's honeysuckle

Synonyms: Lonicera subspicata var. johnstonii D.D. Keck

In this variety, the leaves are shaped wide-elliptic to more or less round, and are less than twice as long as they are wide. It is found in Butte County, the California Coast Ranges, the Transverse Ranges, and the Peninsular Ranges into Baja California. Flowering is from June to July

=== var. subspicata ===
Santa Barbara honeysuckle

In this variety, the leaves are shaped narrowly elliptic, and are 3 to 4 times longer than they are wide. It is found only on Santa Catalina Island and the western Transverse Ranges. Flowering is from April to May.

== Distribution and habitat ==
This shrub occurs from the San Francisco Bay Area and the northern Sierra Nevada south through the Coast Ranges, into the Transverse Ranges and Peninsular Ranges that extend through Baja California. It reaches its southern distribution at the Tres Vírgenes in Baja California Sur. It is also found on Cedros Island.

== Cultivation ==
For variety denudata, the fruit is reportedly edible. In cultivation, the plant makes a drought-tolerant vining shrub that is good cover for a low fence or the north side of a house. It will climb with support. It is cold hardy to 25 degrees Fahrenheit.
