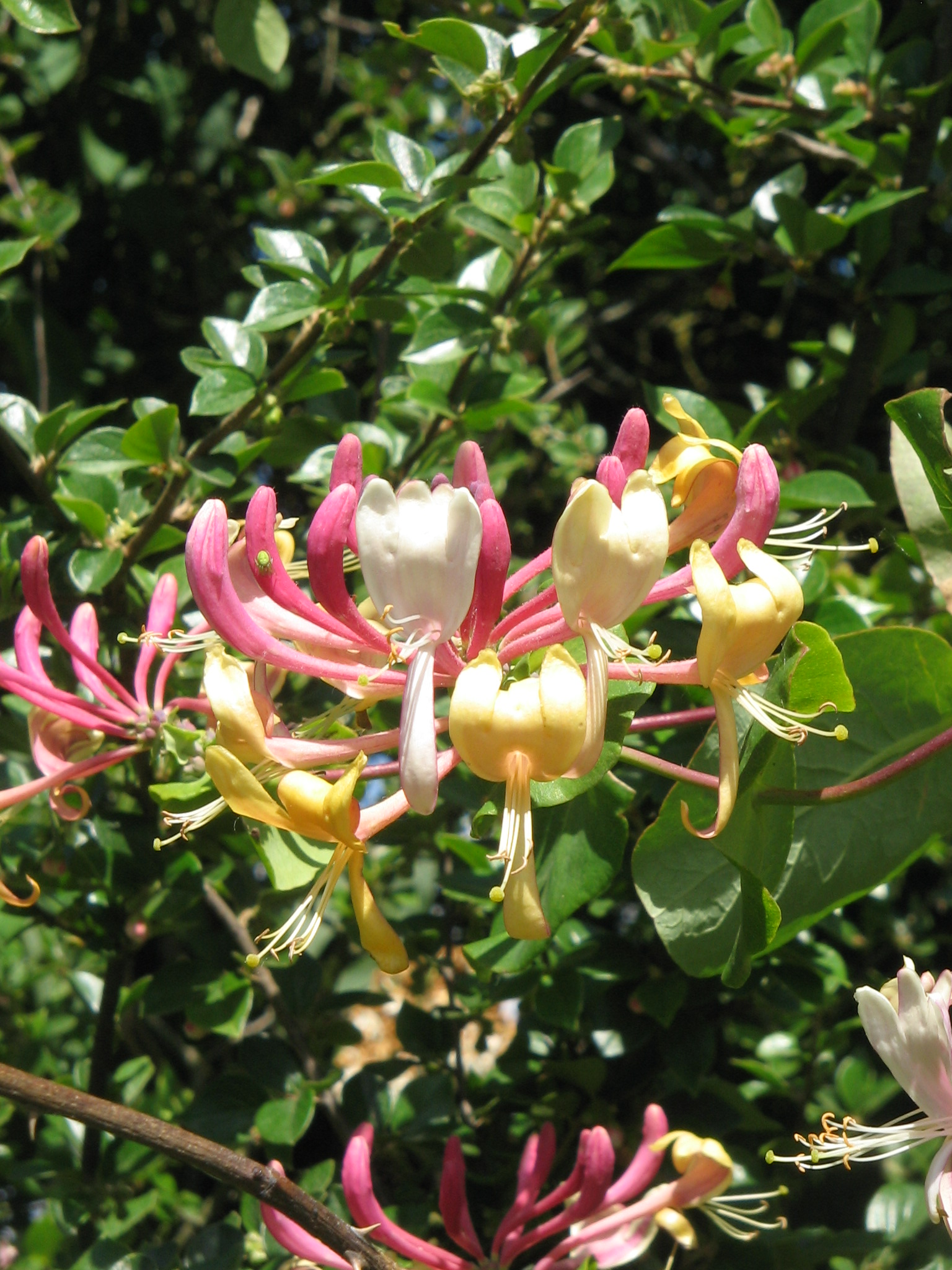

- 1. A flowering branch, 2. A fruiting branch, 3. Longitudinal section of a flower, 4. Fruit cut horizontally.

Scientific classification
- Kingdom: Plantae
- Clade: Tracheophytes
- Clade: Angiosperms
- Clade: Eudicots
- Clade: Asterids
- Order: Dipsacales
- Family: Caprifoliaceae
- Subfamily: Caprifolioideae
- Genus: Lonicera; L. (1753)

Type species
- Lonicera caprifolium L.

Species
- 158; see text

Synonyms
- List: Caprifolium Mill. (1754); Chamaecerasus Medik. (1789); Cobaea Neck. (1790), opus utique oppr.; Devendraea Pusalkar (2011); Distegia Raf. (1838); Euchylia Dulac (1867), nom. superfl.; Isika Adans. (1763); Itia Molina (1810); Kantemon Raf. (1838); Metalonicera Wang & A.G.Gu (1988); Nintooa Sweet (1830), nom. nud.; Periclymenum Mill. (1754); Phenianthus Raf. (1820); Xylosteon Mill. (1754)

= Honeysuckle =

Honeysuckle Temporal range: Miocene–Recent

Genus of flowering plants

Honeysuckle is an arching shrub or twining vine in the genus Lonicera (/lɒˈnɪsərə/) of the family Caprifoliaceae. The genus includes 158 species native to northern latitudes in North America, Eurasia, and North Africa.

Widely known species include Lonicera periclymenum (common honeysuckle or woodbine), Lonicera japonica (Japanese honeysuckle, white honeysuckle, jinyinhua in Chinese), Lonicera tragophylla (Chinese honeysuckle), and Lonicera sempervirens (coral honeysuckle, trumpet honeysuckle, or woodbine honeysuckle).

L. japonica is an aggressive generalist species. Introduced globally from Asia in the early 1800s, it has become an invasive species in parts of North America, Europe, South America, New Zealand, Australia, and Africa.

Some species are highly fragrant and colorful, so are cultivated as ornamental garden plants. In North America, hummingbirds are attracted to the flowers, especially L. sempervirens and L. ciliosa (orange honeysuckle). Honeysuckle derives its name from the edible sweet nectar obtainable from its tubular flowers. The name Lonicera stems from Adam Lonicer, a Renaissance botanist.

== Description ==
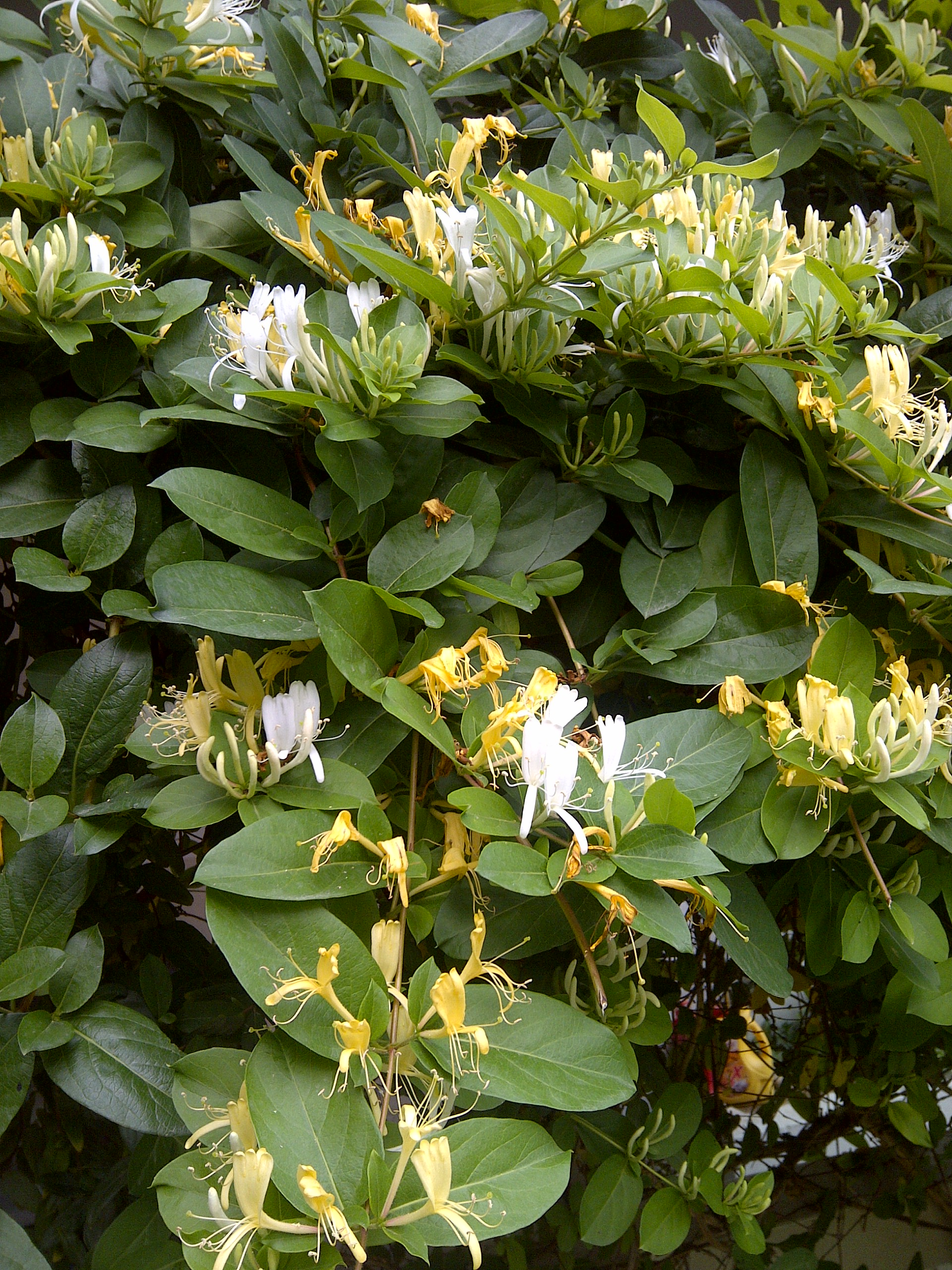
Japanese honeysuckle (Lonicera japonica)

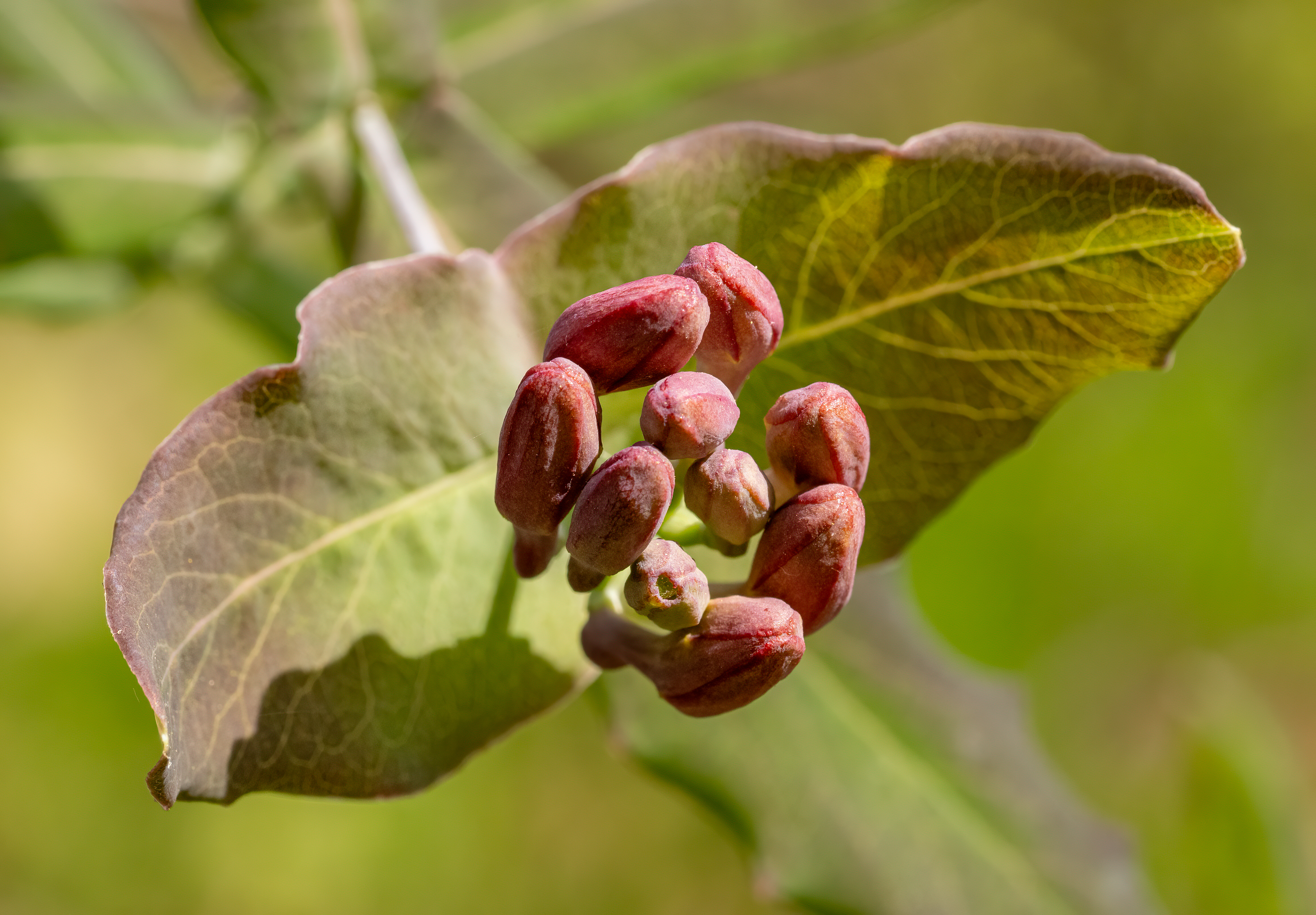
Wild honeysuckle buds in New York

Most species of Lonicera are hardy twining climbers, with a minority of shrubby habit. Some species (including Lonicera hildebrandiana from the Himalayan foothills and L. etrusca from the Mediterranean) are tender and can be grown outside only in subtropical zones. The leaves are opposite, simple oval, 1–10 cm (0.39–3.94 in) long; most are deciduous but some are evergreen.

Many of the species have sweetly scented, bilaterally symmetrical flowers that produce a sweet, edible nectar, and most flowers are borne in clusters of two (leading to the common name of "twinberry" for certain North American species). Both shrubby and vining sorts have strongly fibrous stems which have been used for binding and textiles.

The fruit is a red, blue or black spherical or elongated berry containing several seeds; in most species the berries are mildly poisonous, but in a few (notably Lonicera caerulea) they are edible and grown for home use and commerce. Most honeysuckle berries are attractive to wildlife, which has led to species such as L. japonica and L. maackii spreading invasively outside of their home ranges. Many species of Lonicera are eaten by the larvae of some Lepidoptera species—see a list of Lepidoptera that feed on honeysuckles.

=== Invasive species ===
Several species of honeysuckle have become invasive when introduced outside their native range, particularly in North America, Europe, South America, Australia, and Africa. Invasive species include L. japonica, L. maackii, L. morrowii, L. tatarica, and the hybrid between the last two, L. × bella.

The spread of L. japonica in North America began in 1806, and it was widely cultivated by the 1860s, including in Canada and in Massachusetts. It was first discovered in the wild of Ontario forests in 1976, and became invasive by 2007. L. japonica was introduced in Australia between 1820 and 1840.

As of 2026, honeysuckles occur in Canada from Alberta eastward to Ontario, Quebec, and Atlantic Canada, and in some 25 American states.

== Cultivation ==
Honeysuckle is valued as a garden plant, for its ability to cover unsightly walls and outbuildings, its profuse tubular flowers in early summer, and the intense fragrance of many varieties. The hardy climbing types need their roots in shade, and their flowering tops in sunlight or very light shade. Varieties need to be chosen with care, as they can become substantial. Cultivars of the dense, small-leaved L. nitida are used as low, narrow hedges.

The following hybrids have gained the Royal Horticultural Society's Award of Garden Merit:

- L. × heckrottii 'Gold Flame'
- L. 'Mandarin'
- L. × purpusii 'Winter Beauty'
- L. × tellmanniana

Other cultivars are dealt with under their species names.

The honeysuckle species L. japonica is grown as a commercial crop for use in traditional Chinese medicine.

Honeysuckle is also used to scent Chinese teas in a process similar to Jasmine tea. This was popularized in the Qing dynasty.

== Phytochemicals ==
Component analyses of berries from 27 different cultivars and 3 genotypes of edible honeysuckle (Lonicera caerulea var. kamtschatica) showed the presence of iridoids, anthocyanins, flavonols, flavanonols, flavones, flavan-3-ols, and phenolic acids. While sugars determine the level of sweetness in the berries, organic acids and polyphenols are responsible for the sour taste and tartness. Some 51 of the same compounds in berries are found in flowers, although the proportions of these compounds varied among cultivars studied.

== Interaction with other species ==
Many insects in the order Lepidoptera visit honeysuckles as a food source. An example of this is the moth Deilephila elpenor. This nocturnal species of moth is especially attracted to honeysuckles, which visits the flowers at night to feed on their nectar.

== Species ==
158 species are accepted.

- Lonicera acuminata Wall. or Lonicera pampaninii – fragrant grove honeysuckle or vine honeysuckle
- Lonicera affinis Hook. & Arn.
- Lonicera alberti Regel
- Lonicera albiflora Torr. & A.Gray – white honeysuckle
- Lonicera alpigena L. – alpine honeysuckle
- Lonicera altmannii Regel & Schmalh.
- Lonicera × americana (Mill.) K.Koch
- Lonicera angustifolia Wall. ex DC.
- Lonicera annamensis Fukuoka
- Lonicera arborea Boiss.
- Lonicera arizonica Rehder – Arizona honeysuckle
- Lonicera asperifolia (Decne.) Hook.f. & Thomson
- Lonicera × bella – Bell's honeysuckle or showy fly honeysuckle
- Lonicera biflora Desf.
- Lonicera bournei Hemsl.
- Lonicera bracteolaris Boiss. & Buhse
- Lonicera buschiorum Pojark.
- Lonicera caerulea L. – blue-berried honeysuckle
- Lonicera calcarata Hemsl.
- Lonicera cambodiana Pierre ex Danguy
- Lonicera canadensis J.Bartram & W.Bartram ex Marshall – Canada fly honeysuckle, American fly honeysuckle
- Lonicera caprifolium L. – goat-leaf honeysuckle, perfoliate honeysuckle
- Lonicera caucasica Pall.
- Lonicera cerasina Maxim.
- Lonicera cerviculata S.S.White
- Lonicera chamissoi Bunge
- Lonicera chrysantha Turcz. ex Ledeb. – Chrysantha honeysuckle
- Lonicera ciliosa Poir. – orange honeysuckle
- Lonicera confusa DC.
- Lonicera conjugialis Kellogg – purpleflower honeysuckle
- Lonicera crassifolia Batalin
- Lonicera cyanocarpa Franch.
- Lonicera deleiensis C.E.C.Fisch. & Kaul
- Lonicera demissa Rehder
- Lonicera dioica L. – limber honeysuckle
- Lonicera elisae Franch.
- Lonicera etrusca Santi – Etruscan honeysuckle
- Lonicera fargesii Franch.
- Lonicera ferdinandii Franch.
- Lonicera ferruginea Rehder
- Lonicera flava Sims – yellow honeysuckle
- Lonicera floribunda Boiss. & Buhse
- Lonicera fragrantissima Lindl. & Paxton – winter honeysuckle
- Lonicera glabrata Wall.
- Lonicera glehnii F.Schmidt
- Lonicera gracilipes Miq.
- Lonicera griffithii Hook.f. & Thomson
- Lonicera guatemalensis Véliz & E.Carrillo
- Lonicera guillonii H.Lév. & Vaniot
- Lonicera gynochlamydea Hemsl.
- Lonicera harae Makino
- Lonicera × heckrottii – golden flame honeysuckle
- Lonicera × helvetica Brügger
- Lonicera heterotricha Pojark. & Zakirov
- Lonicera hildebrandiana Collett & Hemsl. – giant Burmese honeysuckle
- Lonicera himalayensis Gand.
- Lonicera hirsuta Eaton – hairy honeysuckle
- Lonicera hispida Pall. ex Schult.
- Lonicera hispidula (Lindl.) F.Dietr. – pink honeysuckle
- Lonicera humilis Kar. & Kir.
- Lonicera hypoglauca Miq.
- Lonicera hypoleuca Decne.
- Lonicera iberica M.Bieb.
- Lonicera iliensis Pojark.
- Lonicera implexa Aiton
- Lonicera interrupta Benth. – Chaparral honeysuckle
- Lonicera involucrata (Richardson) Banks ex Spreng. – bearberry honeysuckle
- Lonicera × italica Kütz.
- Lonicera japonica Thunb. – Japanese honeysuckle
- Lonicera kansuensis (Batalin ex Rehder) Pojark.
- Lonicera kawakamii (Hayata) Masam.
- Lonicera korolkowii Stapf – blueleaf honeysuckle
- Lonicera kurobushiensis Kadota
- Lonicera laceana M.P.Nayar & G.S.Giri
- Lonicera lanceolata Wall.
- Lonicera ligustrina Wall.
  - Lonicera ligustrina var. ligustrina
  - Lonicera ligustrina var. pileata (Oliv.) Franch. (syn. Lonicera pileata Oliv.) – privet honeysuckle
  - Lonicera ligustrina var. yunnanensis Franch. (syn. Lonicera nitida E.H.Wilson) – boxleaf honeysuckle
- Lonicera litangensis Batalin
- Lonicera longiflora DC.
- Lonicera longituba H.T.Chang
- Lonicera maackii (Rupr.) Maxim. – Amur honeysuckle
- Lonicera macrantha (D.Don) Spreng.
- Lonicera macranthoides Hand.-Mazz.
- Lonicera magnibracteata M.P.Nayar & G.S.Giri
- Lonicera malayana M.R.Hend.
- Lonicera maximowiczii (Rupr.) Regel
- Lonicera mexicana (Kunth) Rehder
- Lonicera micrantha Trautv. ex Regel
- Lonicera microphylla Willd. ex Schult.
- Lonicera minutifolia Kitam.
- Lonicera mochidzukiana Makino
- Lonicera modesta Rehder
- Lonicera morrowii A.Gray – Morrow's honeysuckle
- Lonicera mucronata Rehder
- Lonicera myrtilloides Purpus
- Lonicera nervosa Maxim.
- Lonicera nigra L. – black-berried honeysuckle
- Lonicera nummulariifolia Jaub. & Spach
- Lonicera oblata K.S.Hao ex P.S.Hsu & H.J.Wang
- Lonicera oblongifolia Hook. – swamp fly honeysuckle
- Lonicera obovata Royle ex Hook.f. & Thomson
- Lonicera olgae Regel & Schmalh.
- Lonicera oreodoxa Harry Sm. ex Rehder
- Lonicera pamirica Pojark.
- Lonicera paradoxa Pojark.
- Lonicera periclymenum L. – (common) honeysuckle, European honeysuckle, or woodbine
- Lonicera pilosa (Kunth) Steud. – Mexican honeysuckle
- Lonicera praeflorens Batalin
- Lonicera purpurascens (Jacquem. ex Decne.) Walp.
- Lonicera pyrenaica L. – Pyrenean honeysuckle
- Lonicera quinquelocularis Hardw. – translucent honeysuckle
- Lonicera reticulata Raf. – grape honeysuckle
- Lonicera retusa Franch.
- Lonicera robertsonii Gamble
- Lonicera rupicola Hook.f. & Thomson
- Lonicera ruprechtiana Regel – Manchurian honeysuckle
- Lonicera × sargentii Rehder
- Lonicera schmitziana Roezl ex Dippel
- Lonicera semenovii Regel
- Lonicera sempervirens L. – trumpet honeysuckle
- Lonicera setifera Franch.
- Lonicera siamensis Gamble
- Lonicera similis Hemsl. – var. delavayi – Delavay honeysuckle
- Lonicera sinomacrantha Z.H.Chen, L.X.Ye & X.F.Jin
- Lonicera sovetkinae Tkatsch.
- Lonicera spinosa (Decne.) Jacquem. ex Walp.
- Lonicera splendida Boiss. – evergreen honeysuckle
- Lonicera stabiana Guss. ex Pasq.
- Lonicera stephanocarpa Franch.
- Lonicera steveniana Fisch. ex Pojark.
- Lonicera strophiophora Franch.
- Lonicera subaequalis Rehder
- Lonicera subhispida Nakai
- Lonicera sublabiata P.S.Hsu & H.J.Wang
- Lonicera subsessilis Rehder
- Lonicera subspicata Hook. & Arn. – southern honeysuckle
- Lonicera sumatrana Miq.
- Lonicera taiwanensis S.S.Ying
- Lonicera tangutica Maxim.
- Lonicera tatarica L. – Tatarian honeysuckle
- Lonicera tatarinowii Maxim.
- Lonicera tolmatchevii Pojark.
- Lonicera tomentella Hook.f. & Thomson
- Lonicera tragophylla Hemsl. – Chinese honeysuckle
- Lonicera tricalysioides C.Y.Wu
- Lonicera trichosantha Bureau & Franch.
- Lonicera tschonoskii Maxim.
- Lonicera tubuliflora Rehder
- Lonicera tulinensis S.S.Ying
- Lonicera utahensis S.Watson – Utah honeysuckle
- Lonicera uzenensis Kadota
- Lonicera vaccinioides Rehder
- Lonicera vidalii Franch. & Sav.
- Lonicera villosa (Michx.) Schult. – mountain fly honeysuckle
- Lonicera webbiana Wall. ex DC.
- Lonicera xylosteum L. – fly woodbine
- Lonicera yunnanensis Franch.
- Lonicera zeravshanica Pojark.

Several fossil species are known from the Miocene of Asia.

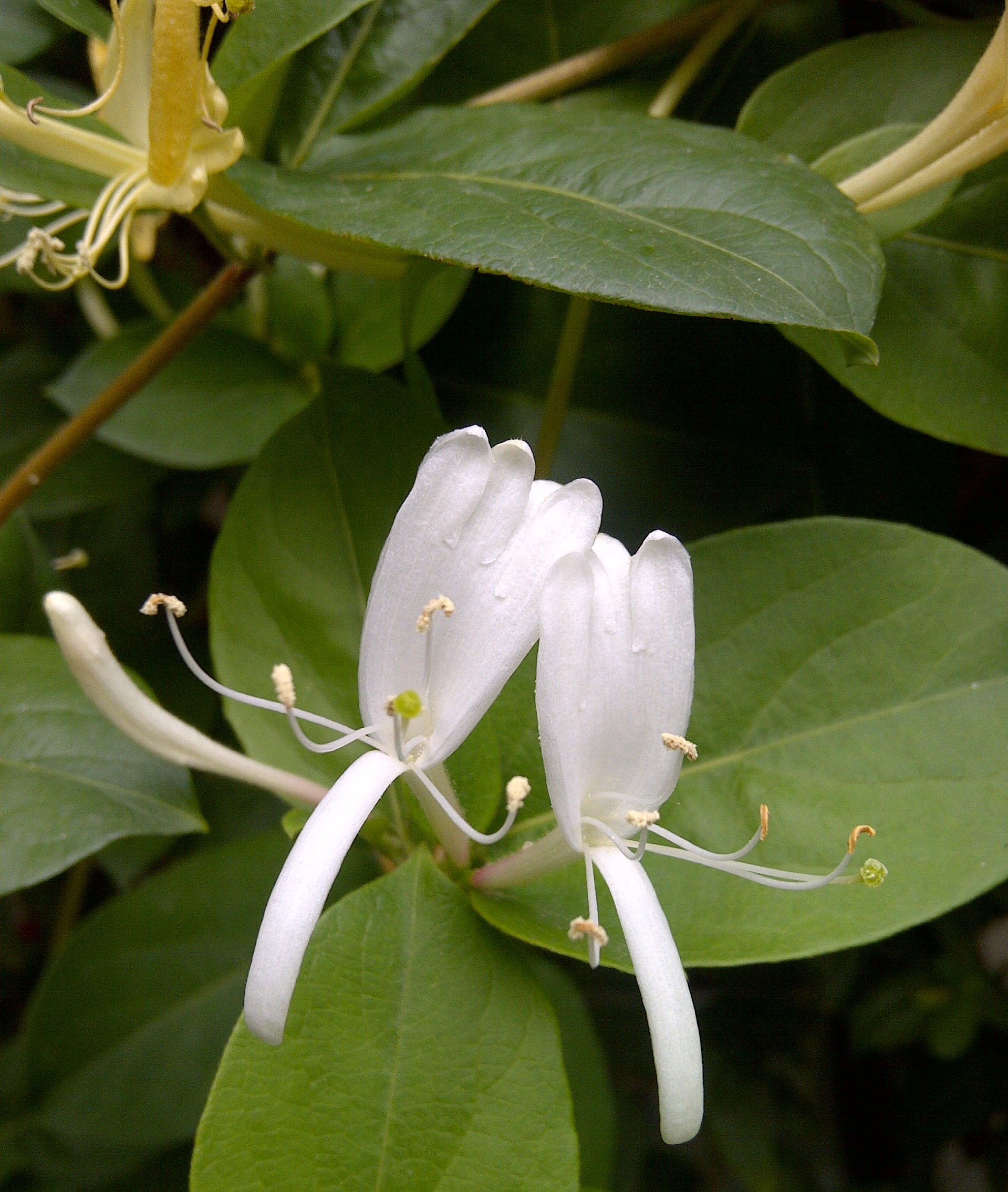
Lonicera japonica

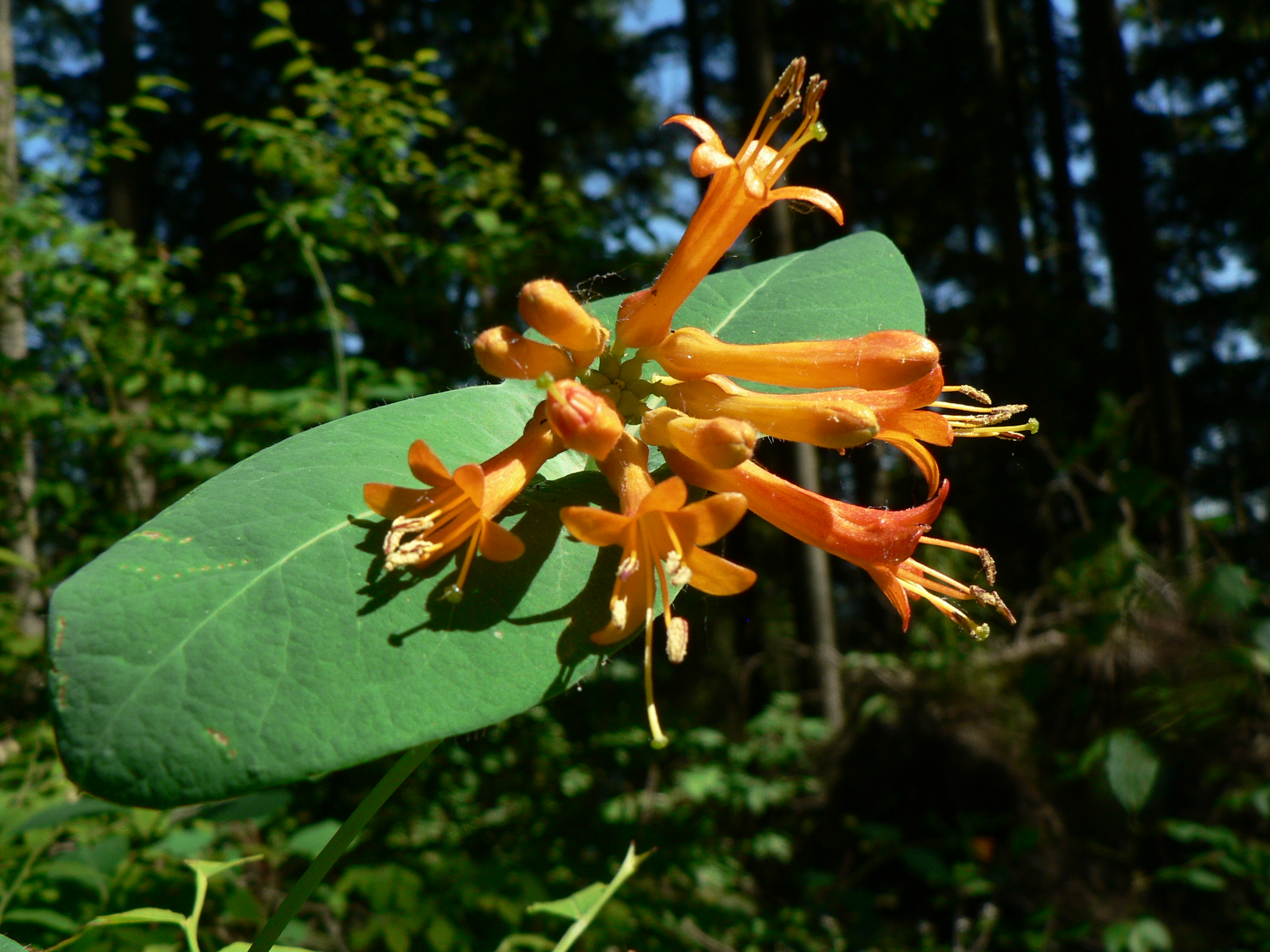
L. ciliosa

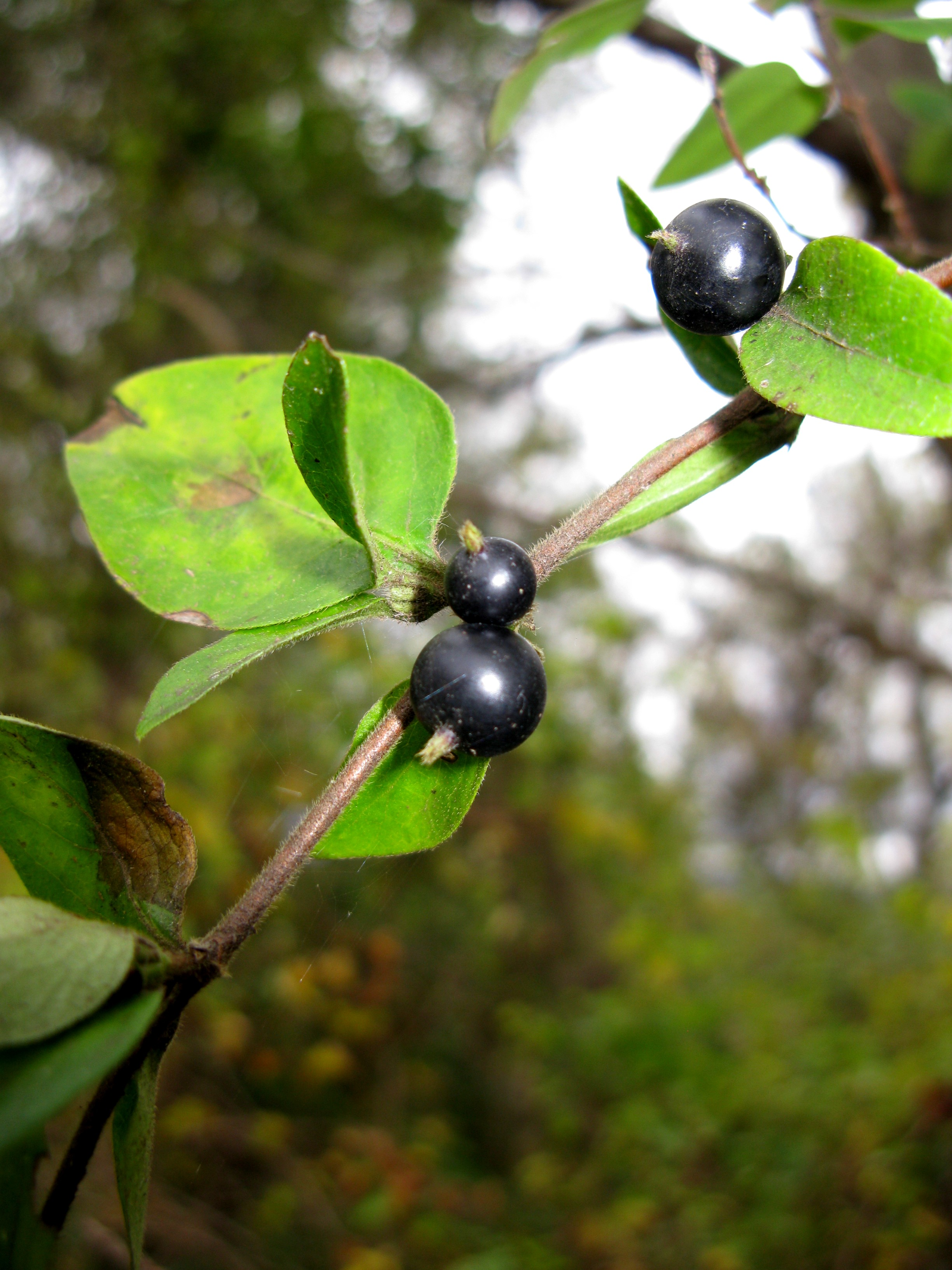
L. japonica fruit

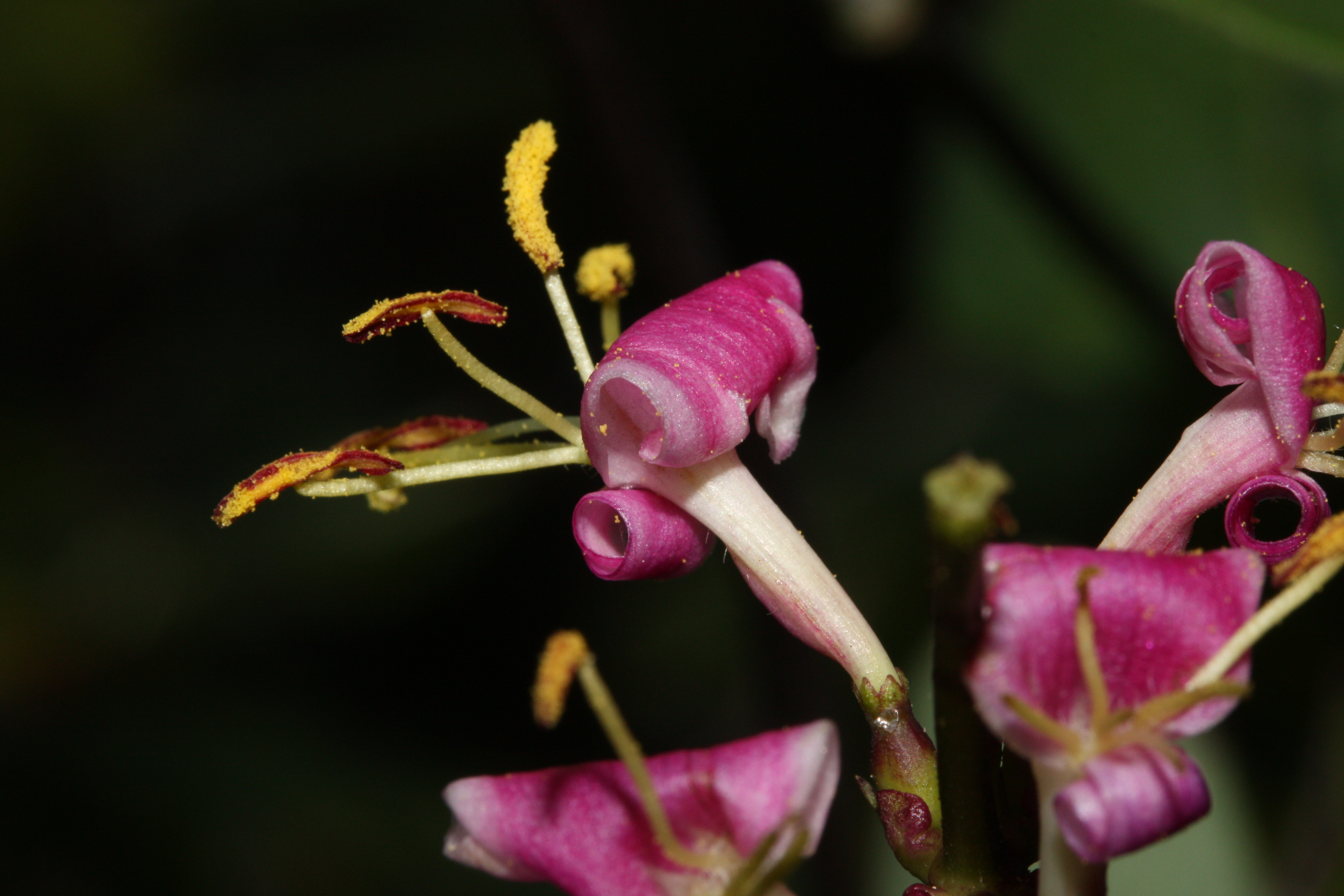
L. hispidula

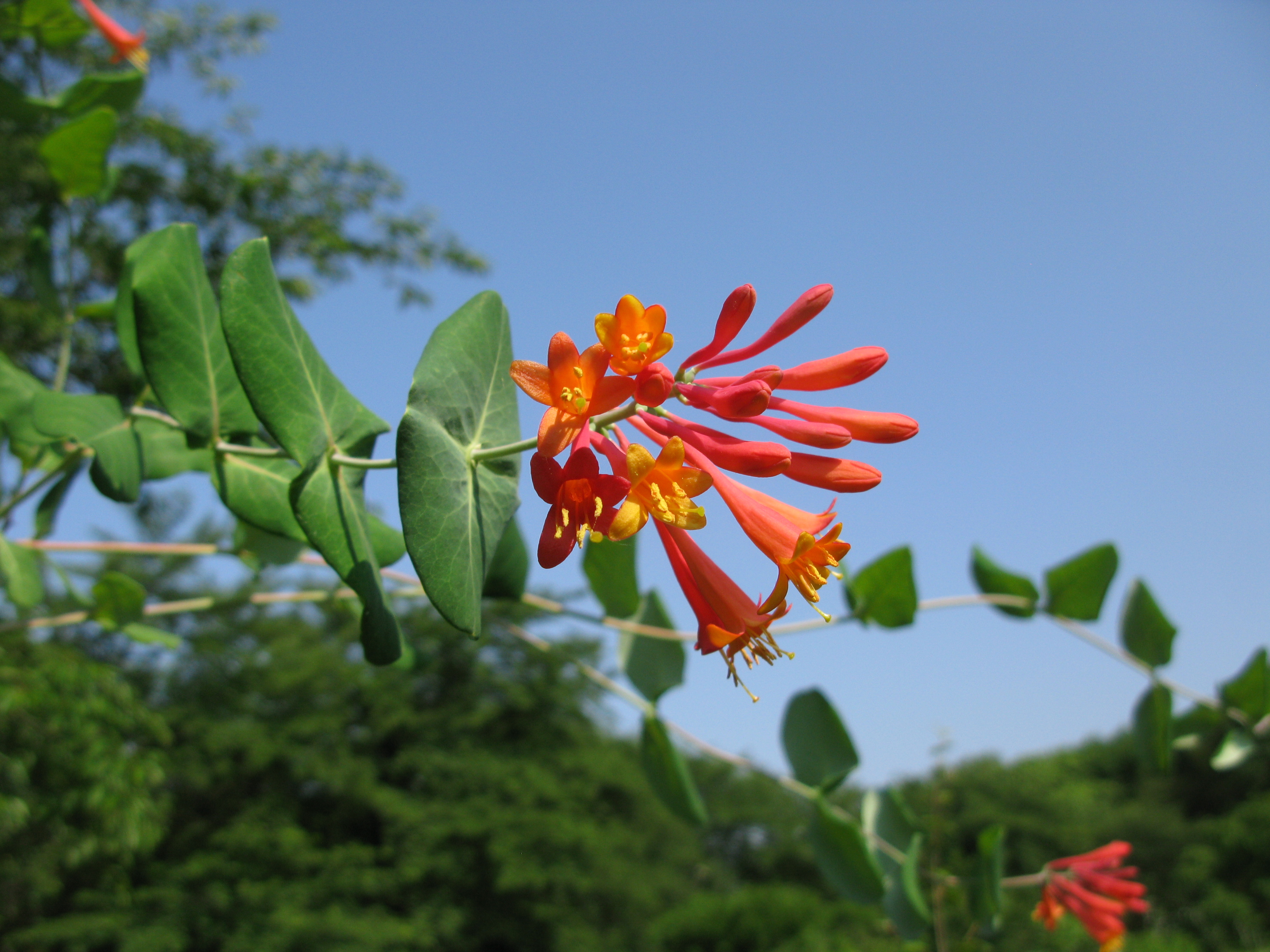
L. sempervirens

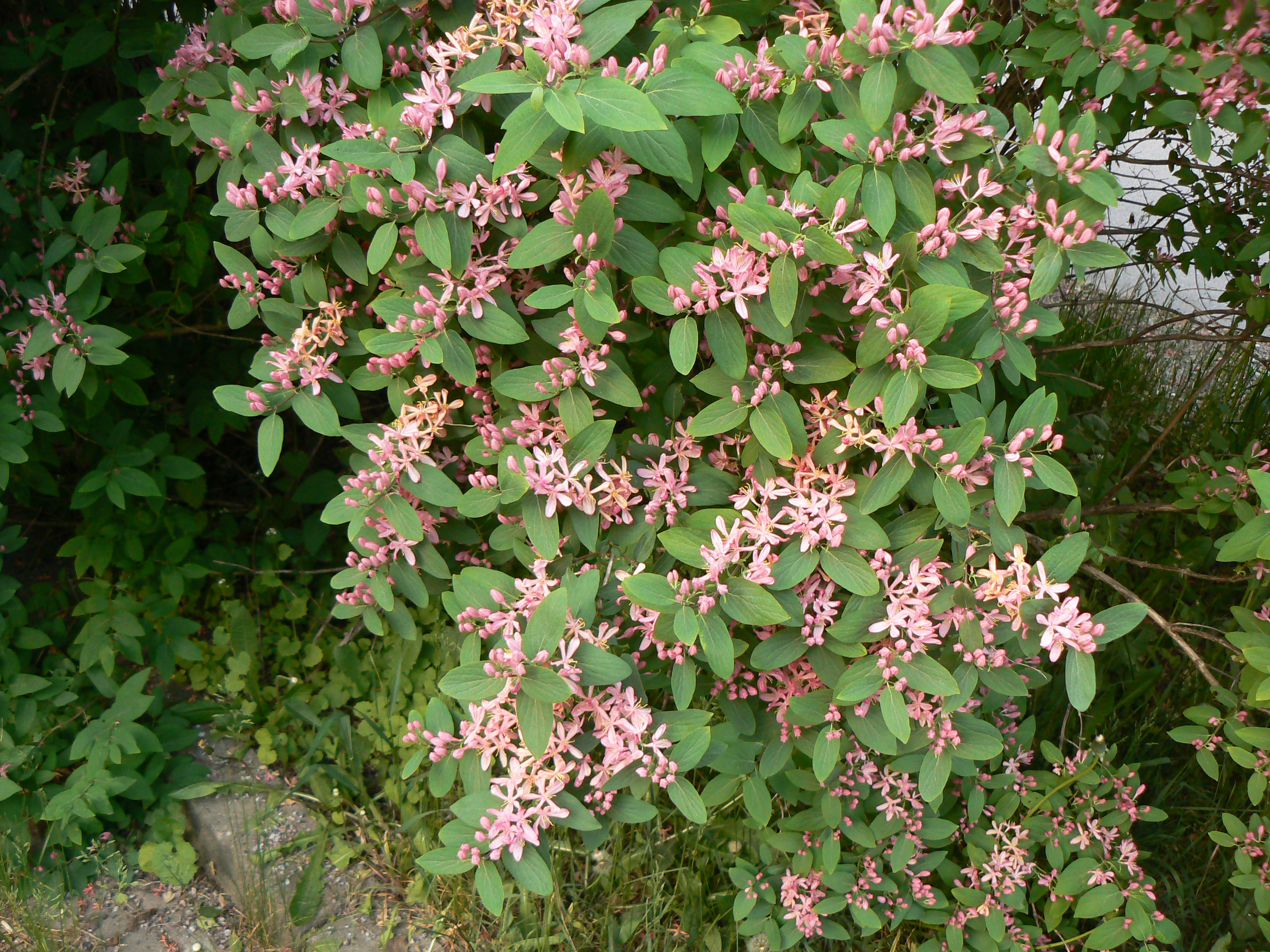
L. tatarica

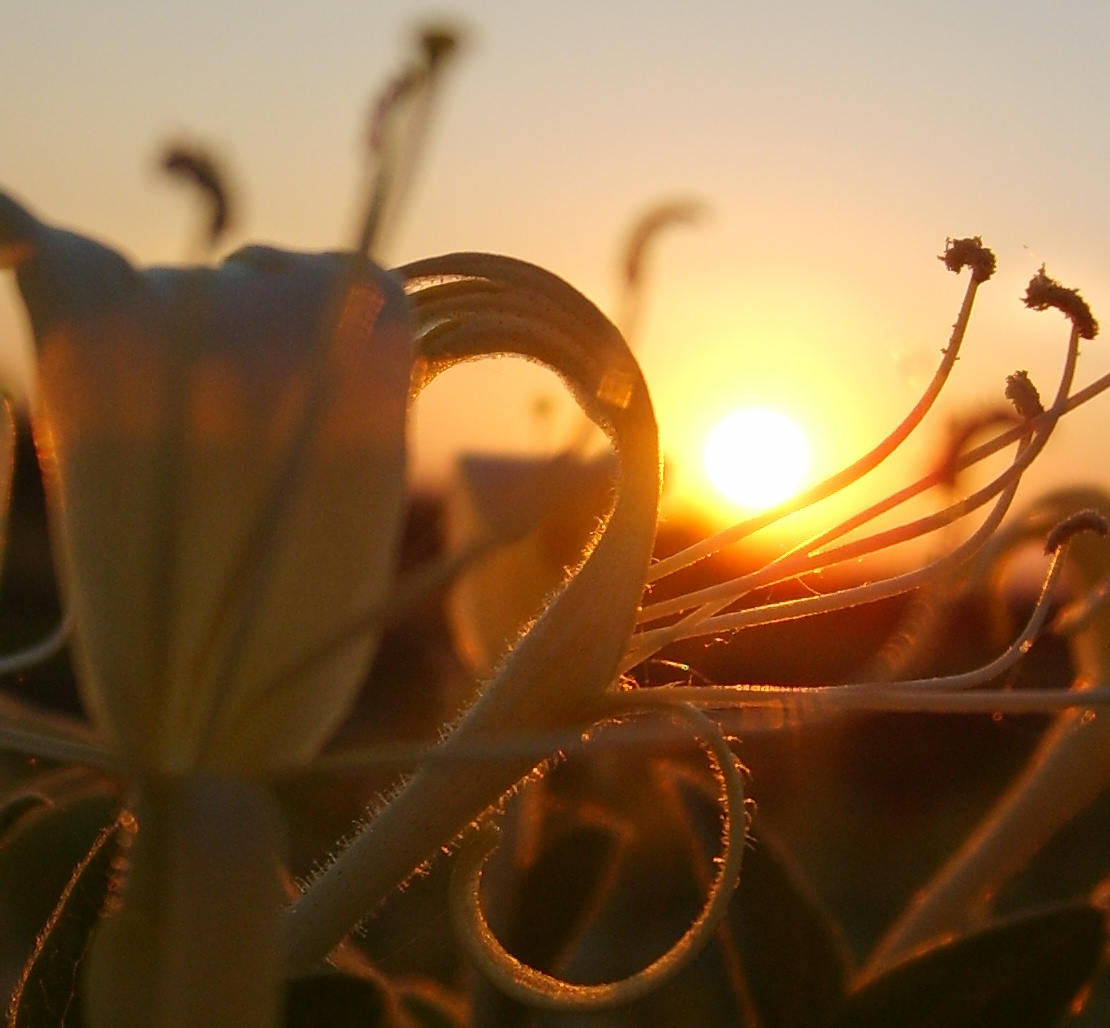
L.caprifolium, Chèvrefeuille

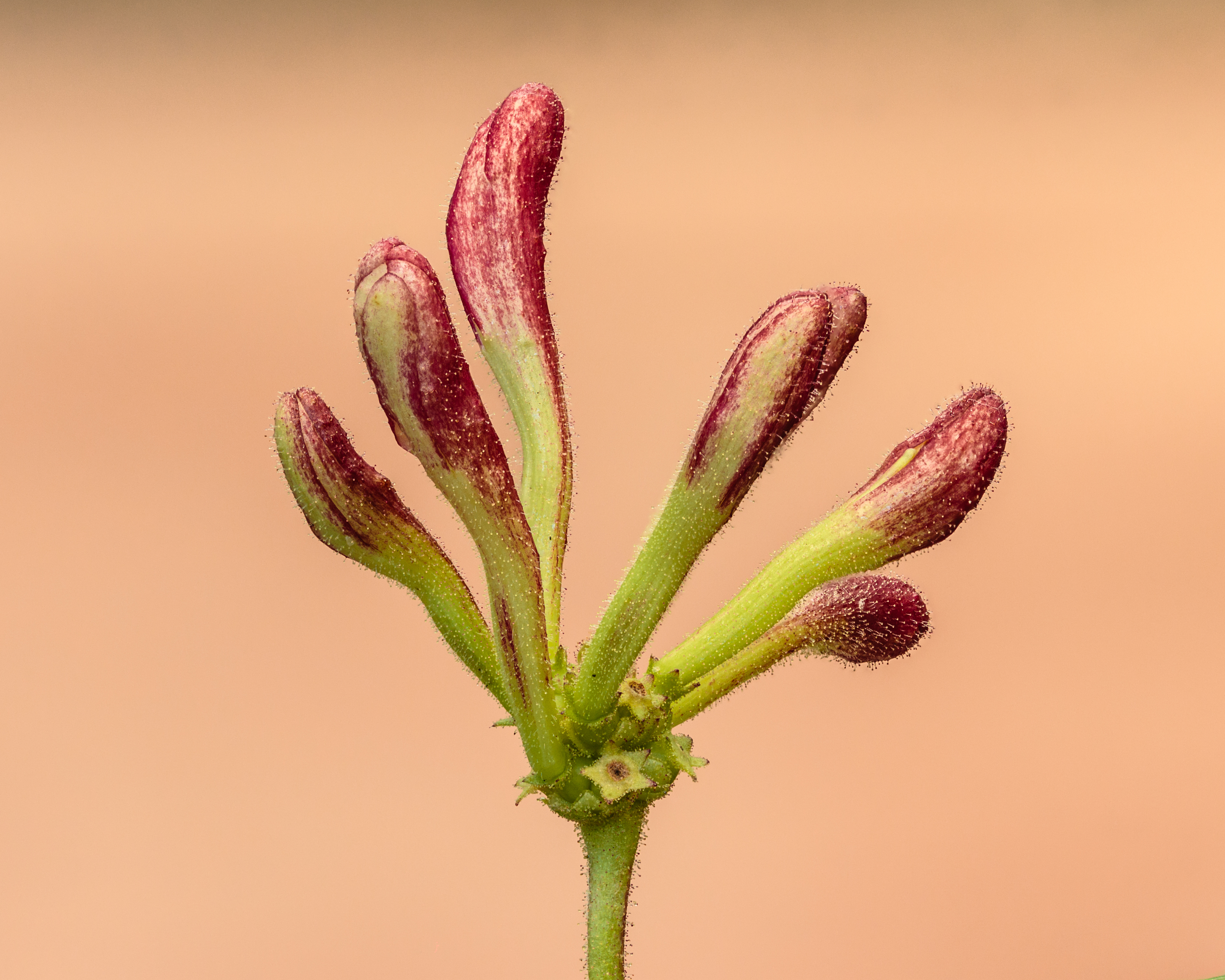
flower buds.
