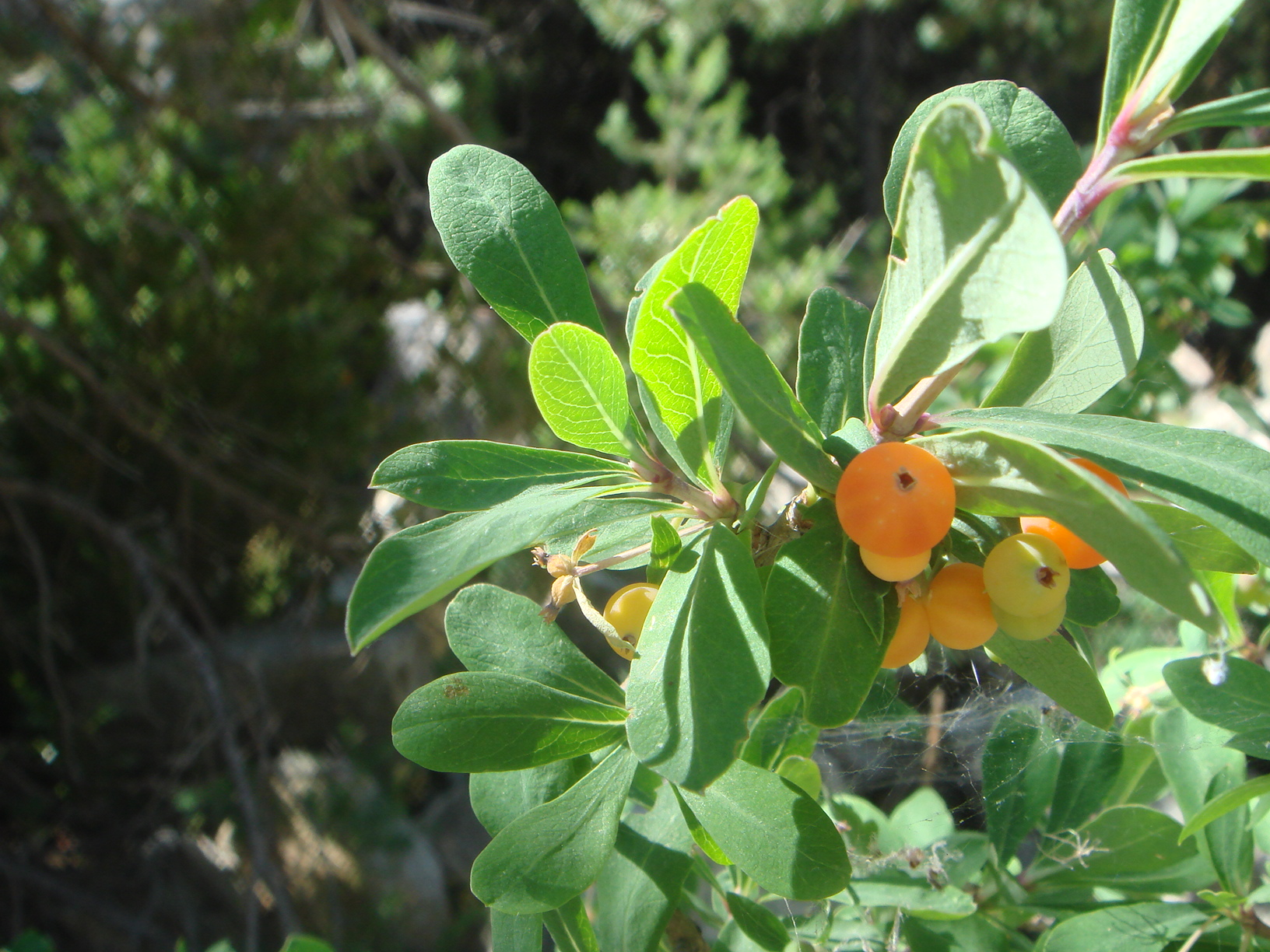

Scientific classification
- Kingdom: Plantae
- Clade: Tracheophytes
- Clade: Angiosperms
- Clade: Eudicots
- Clade: Asterids
- Order: Dipsacales
- Family: Caprifoliaceae
- Genus: Lonicera
- Species: L. pyrenaica

Binomial name
- Lonicera pyrenaica L.

Subspecies
- Lonicera pyrenaica subsp. majoricensis (Gand.) Gand.; Lonicera pyrenaica subsp. pyrenaica

Synonyms
- Caprifolium pyrenaicum (L.) Lam.; Euchylia pyrenaica (L.) Dulac; Xylosteon pyrenaicum (L.) Dum.Cours.

= Lonicera pyrenaica =

Species of honeysuckle

Lonicera pyrenaica, commonly known as Pyrenean honeysuckle, is a species of honeysuckle native to the eastern Pyrenees of France and Spain, the Balearic Islands, and Morocco. It is widely cultivated as a garden plant.

Two subspecies are accepted.

- Lonicera pyrenaica subsp. majoricensis (Gand.) Gand. – Balearic Islands
- Lonicera pyrenaica subsp. pyrenaica – eastern Pyrenees of France and Spain, Morocco
