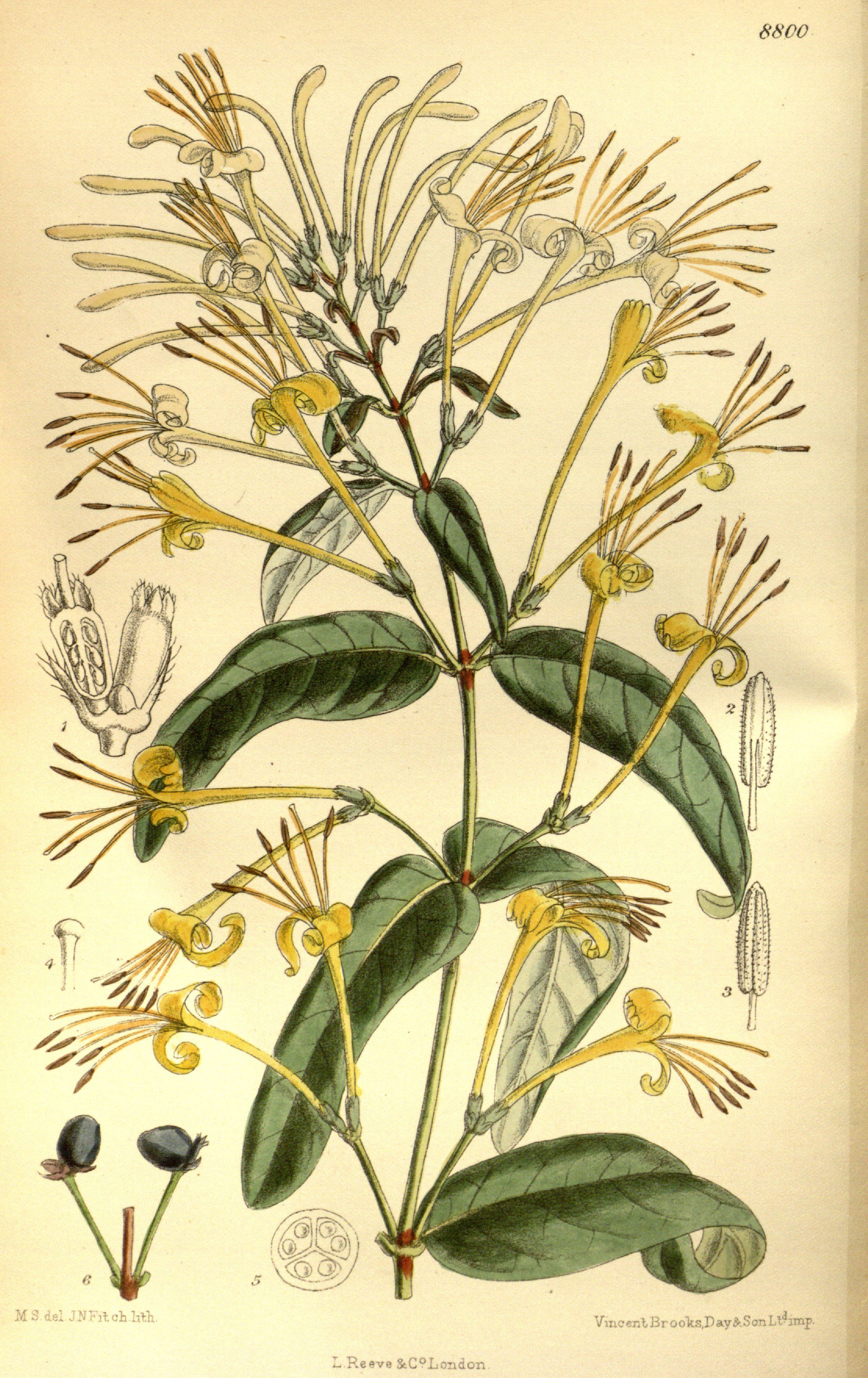
- L. similis var. delavayi

Scientific classification
- Kingdom: Plantae
- Clade: Tracheophytes
- Clade: Angiosperms
- Clade: Eudicots
- Clade: Asterids
- Order: Dipsacales
- Family: Caprifoliaceae
- Genus: Lonicera
- Species: L. similis

Binomial name
- Lonicera similis Hemsl.

Synonyms
- L. similis var. delavayi; L. similis var. omeiensis; L. similis var. similis

= Lonicera similis =

Species of honeysuckle

Lonicera similis is a species of flowering plant in the family Caprifoliaceae, native to Western China. This honeysuckle is known in cultivation by the variety delavayi (the Delavay honeysuckle) which is reported by some authorities to be synonymous with L. similis itself. It is a large, twining, semi-evergreen shrub growing to 8 m (26 ft) tall by 1.5 m (4.9 ft) broad, with a profusion of fragrant tubular flowers opening white and ageing to yellow, in late summer and autumn. The flowers are followed by black berries. The Latin specific epithet similis means "similar to". It is similar in appearance to L. japonica, but larger and more robust. The name delavayi honours the French missionary and botanist Père Jean Marie Delavay (1834-1895).

Lonicera similis var. delavayi is hardy down to −15 °C (5 °F). It has gained the Royal Horticultural Society's Award of Garden Merit.
