= Lonicera kawakamii =

Scientific classification
- Kingdom: Plantae
- Clade: Tracheophytes
- Clade: Angiosperms
- Clade: Eudicots
- Clade: Asterids
- Order: Dipsacales
- Family: Caprifoliaceae
- Genus: Lonicera
- Species: L. kawakamii

Binomial name
- Lonicera kawakamii (Hayata) Masamune

Species of plant

Lonicera kawakamii, also known as Yushan honeysuckle or Kawakami’s honeysuckle, is a species of flowering plant in the family Caprifoliaceae. It is endemic to Taiwan, where it is found at altitudes between 3000 and 3900 meters. It as rated as “Vulnerable” in the “Red List of Vascular Plants of Taiwan, 2017”.

== Description ==
The deciduous shrub is approximately 1 to 2 m (3 ft 3 in to 6 ft 7 in) in height. The leaves are opposite, simple, and chartaceous. The petiole is approximately 0.1 to 0.2 cm (0.039 to 0.079 in) in length. The leaf blade is inversely ovate, approximately 0.6 to 1.2 cm (0.24 to 0.47 in) in length and 0.3 to 0.5 cm (0.12 to 0.20 in) in width, with a rounded apex and an attenuate base. The margins are slightly revolute. Young leaves are pubescent while the matured leaves are glabrous with appressed hairs found on the abaxial surface. The lateral veins are sunken above and raised below. The flowers are axillary, pendulous, and paired, with slender pedicels approximately 0.5 to 1.4 cm (0.20 to 0.55 in) in length. The bracts are in four cross-opposite pairs, with two outer lanceolate-elliptic and two inners shorter. The campanulate calyx has five triangular to ovate lobes and the lower part of the flower has an inferior ovary that is fused. The corolla is tubular with five lobes at the front, initially white and later pale yellow. The five stamens are attached to the throat of the corolla tube. The hairy style is elongated and protrudes from the corolla. The flowering period is from May to August, with the peak bloom in June and July. The fruit is initially green and develops from two fused carpels. The matured fruit is a glabrous spherical dark purple-red berry, approximately 0.25 to 0.4 cm (0.098 to 0.157 in) in diameter. The calyx persists at the tip of the fruit, and the seeds are flattened, approximately 0.2 cm (0.079 in) in length. The fruiting period is from August to September.

== Discovery and taxonomic revision ==
In October 1906, Takiya Kawakami and Ushinosuke Mori collected an opposite-leaved shrub at an altitude of approximately 3,750 m (12,300 ft) on Mount Yushan. This is the earliest collection record. The collection number assigned was 2257.

In 1911, Bunzo Hayata published the shrub as a new species in the College of Science Bulletin of Tokyo Imperial University,” with the scientific name Coprosma kawakamii, using Kawakami’s surname as a specific epithet.

In 1931, while studying the plants of southern Japan, Genkei Masamune discovered that the new species published by Hayata was not a member of the Rubiaceae family but belonged to the Lonicera genus of the Caprifoliaceae family. He consequently changed the botanical name to Lonicera kawakamii.

== Distribution and habitat ==
The habitat of Lonicera kawakamii is in high-altitude mountainous areas, distributed in the Central Mountain Range at an altitude of approximately 3000 to 3900 meters.

== Artificial cultivation ==
There is currently no artificial cultivation and the species was listed as “Vulnerable” in the “Red List of Vascular Plants of Taiwan, 2017.”
