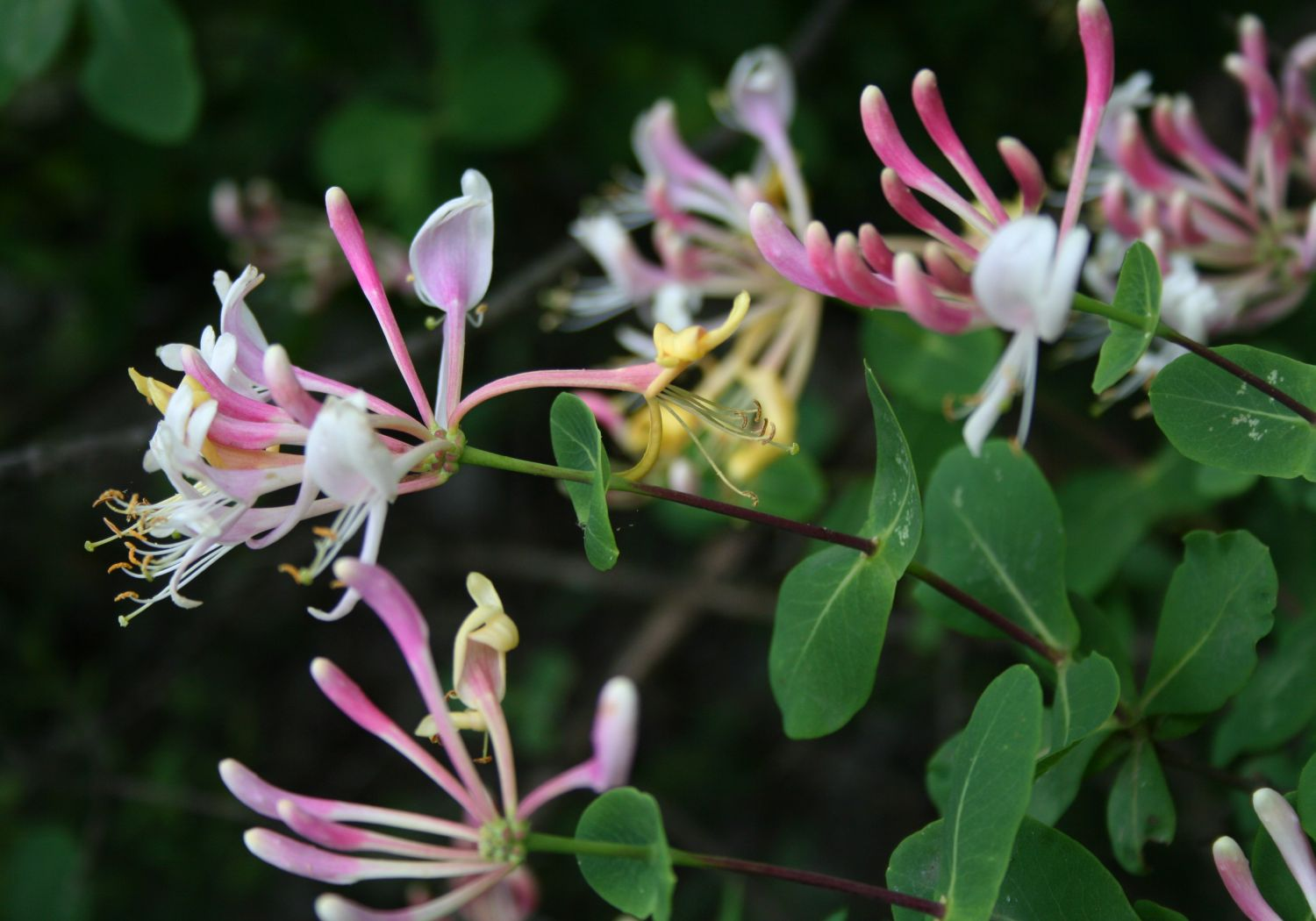

Scientific classification
- Kingdom: Plantae
- Clade: Tracheophytes
- Clade: Angiosperms
- Clade: Eudicots
- Clade: Asterids
- Order: Dipsacales
- Family: Caprifoliaceae
- Genus: Lonicera
- Species: L. etrusca

Binomial name
- Lonicera etrusca Santi

Synonyms
- Caprifolium cyrenaicum Kuntze; Caprifolium dimorphum (Tausch) Kuntze; Caprifolium etruscum Schult.; Caprifolium germanicum Quer; Lonicera dimorpha Tausch

= Lonicera etrusca =

Species of honeysuckle

Lonicera etrusca is a species of honeysuckle known by the common name Etruscan honeysuckle. It is native to Southern Europe, Western Asia and North Africa and it is known elsewhere, including the Pacific Northwest of North America, as an introduced species where it has escaped cultivation. It is kept in gardens as an ornamental plant.

== Description ==
This is a deciduous perennial climber which can reach lengths of 6 meters. It is lined with oval leaves several centimeters long and bears dense spikes of flowers with pairs of fused leaves at the bases. Each flower has an elongated tubular corolla up to 5 centimeters long divided partway into two lips. The flower is light yellow to pale reddish-pink. The stamens and style protrude from the flower's mouth. The fruit is a bright red rounded berry.

== Cultivars ==
Notable cultivars include 'Donald Waterer' and 'Superba'. The latter has gained the Royal Horticultural Society's Award of Garden Merit. It bears fragrant cream-coloured flowers, which age to yellow.

== Other uses ==
In addition to the plant being grown as an ornamental, the leaves and flowers of L. etrusca var. etrusca are used as fodder on Mount Honaz and in its vicinity in the Denizli Province of Turkey.

== Toxicity ==
The berries are poisonous, however they serve as an important source of food for some animals, namely frugivores that live alongside L. etrusca.
