= Lonicera arizonica =

Scientific classification
- Kingdom: Plantae
- Clade: Tracheophytes
- Clade: Angiosperms
- Clade: Eudicots
- Clade: Asterids
- Order: Dipsacales
- Family: Caprifoliaceae
- Genus: Lonicera
- Species: L. arizonica

Binomial name
- Lonicera arizonica Rehder (1902)

Species of honeysuckle

Lonicera arizonica, the Arizona honeysuckle, is a deciduous honeysuckle in the family Caprifoliaceae, native to the Southwest United States and Northern Mexico.

It was first described by Alfred Rehder.
