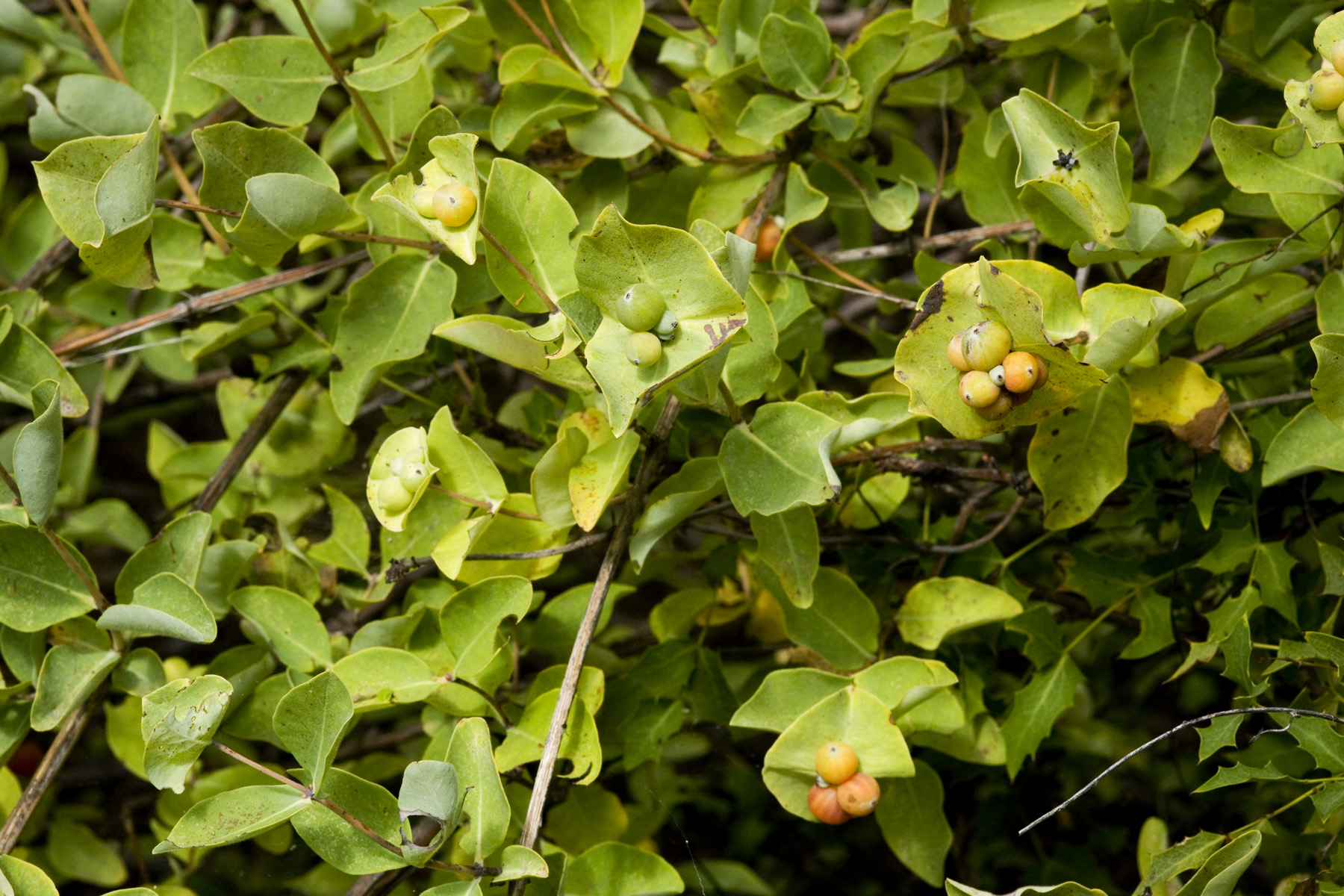

Scientific classification
- Kingdom: Plantae
- Clade: Tracheophytes
- Clade: Angiosperms
- Clade: Eudicots
- Clade: Asterids
- Order: Dipsacales
- Family: Caprifoliaceae
- Genus: Lonicera
- Species: L. albiflora

Binomial name
- Lonicera albiflora Torr. & A.Gray

= Lonicera albiflora =

Species of plant

Lonicera albiflora is a climbing shrub native to North Mexico, Arizona, Arkansas, Oklahoma and Texas.
