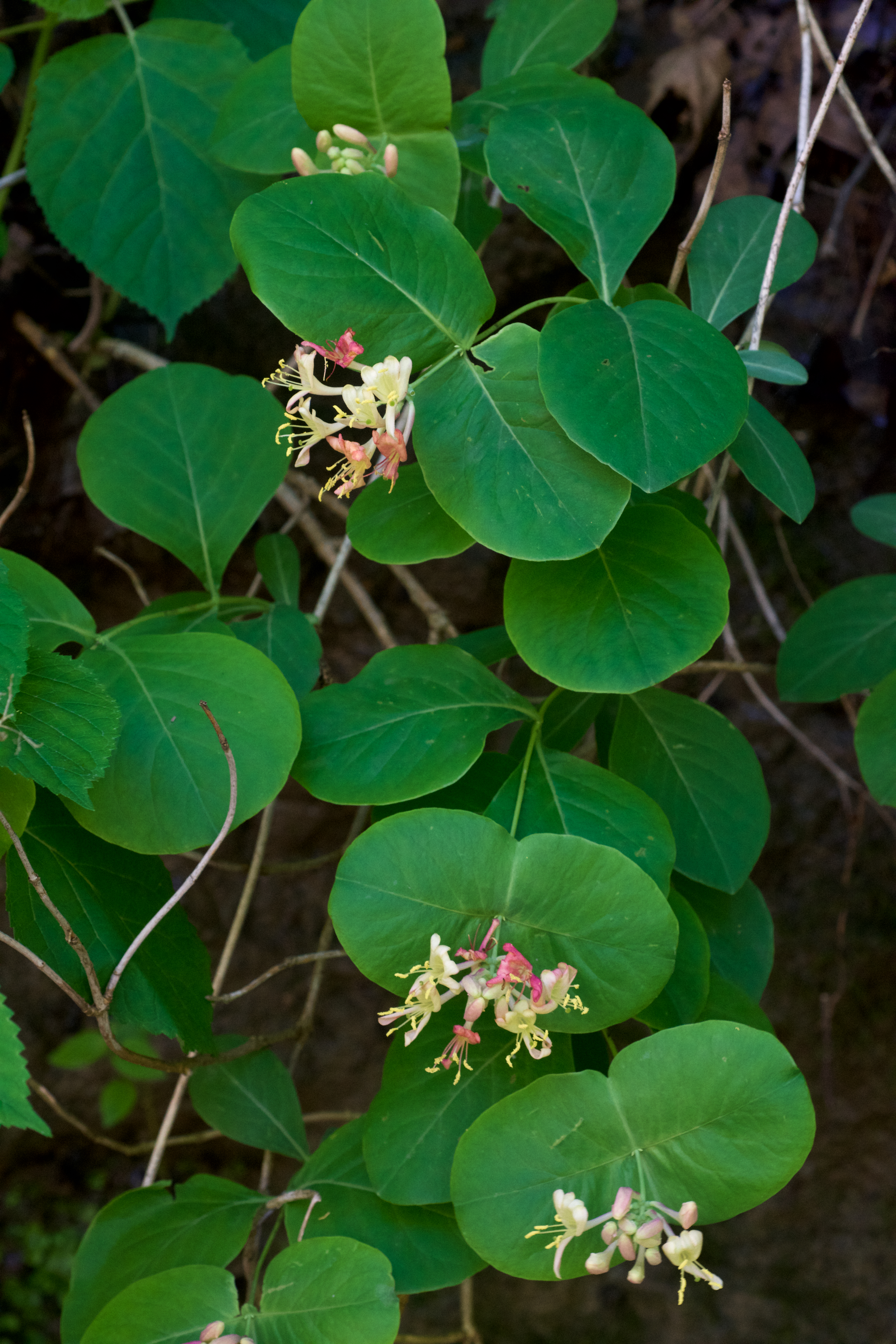

Conservation status
- Secure (NatureServe)

Scientific classification
- Kingdom: Plantae
- Clade: Embryophytes
- Clade: Tracheophytes
- Clade: Spermatophytes
- Clade: Angiosperms
- Clade: Eudicots
- Clade: Asterids
- Order: Dipsacales
- Family: Caprifoliaceae
- Genus: Lonicera
- Species: L. reticulata

Binomial name
- Lonicera reticulata Raf.

= Lonicera reticulata =

Species of honeysuckle

Lonicera reticulata, commonly called grape honeysuckle, is a species of honeysuckle that is native to North America.

It is a perennial vine that produces creamy white or yellow flowers that age to pink in late spring.
