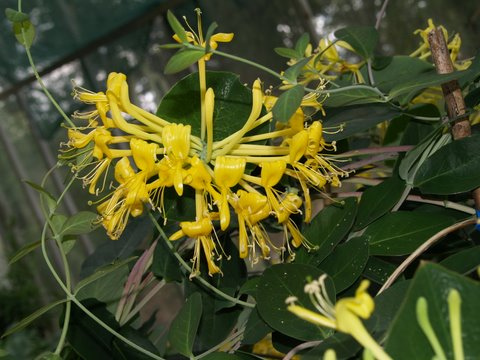

Scientific classification
- Kingdom: Plantae
- Clade: Tracheophytes
- Clade: Angiosperms
- Clade: Eudicots
- Clade: Asterids
- Order: Dipsacales
- Family: Caprifoliaceae
- Genus: Lonicera
- Species: L. tragophylla

Binomial name
- Lonicera tragophylla Hemsl.

Synonyms
- Lonicera harmsii; Caprifolium tragophyllum

= Lonicera tragophylla =

Species of honeysuckle

Lonicera tragophylla, the Chinese honeysuckle, is a species of flowering plant in the family Caprifoliaceae, native to Central China, where it inhabits forest, scrub and rocky crevices. Growing to 6 m (20 ft) tall by 1.5 m (4.9 ft) wide, it is a deciduous climbing shrub with grey-green leaves and trumpet-shaped, pure rich yellow flowers in late summer and autumn. Unlike many of its relatives in the honeysuckle genus Lonicera, it is unscented.

The Latin specific epithet tragophylla means literally "goat leaf".

This plant has gained the Royal Horticultural Society's Award of Garden Merit.
