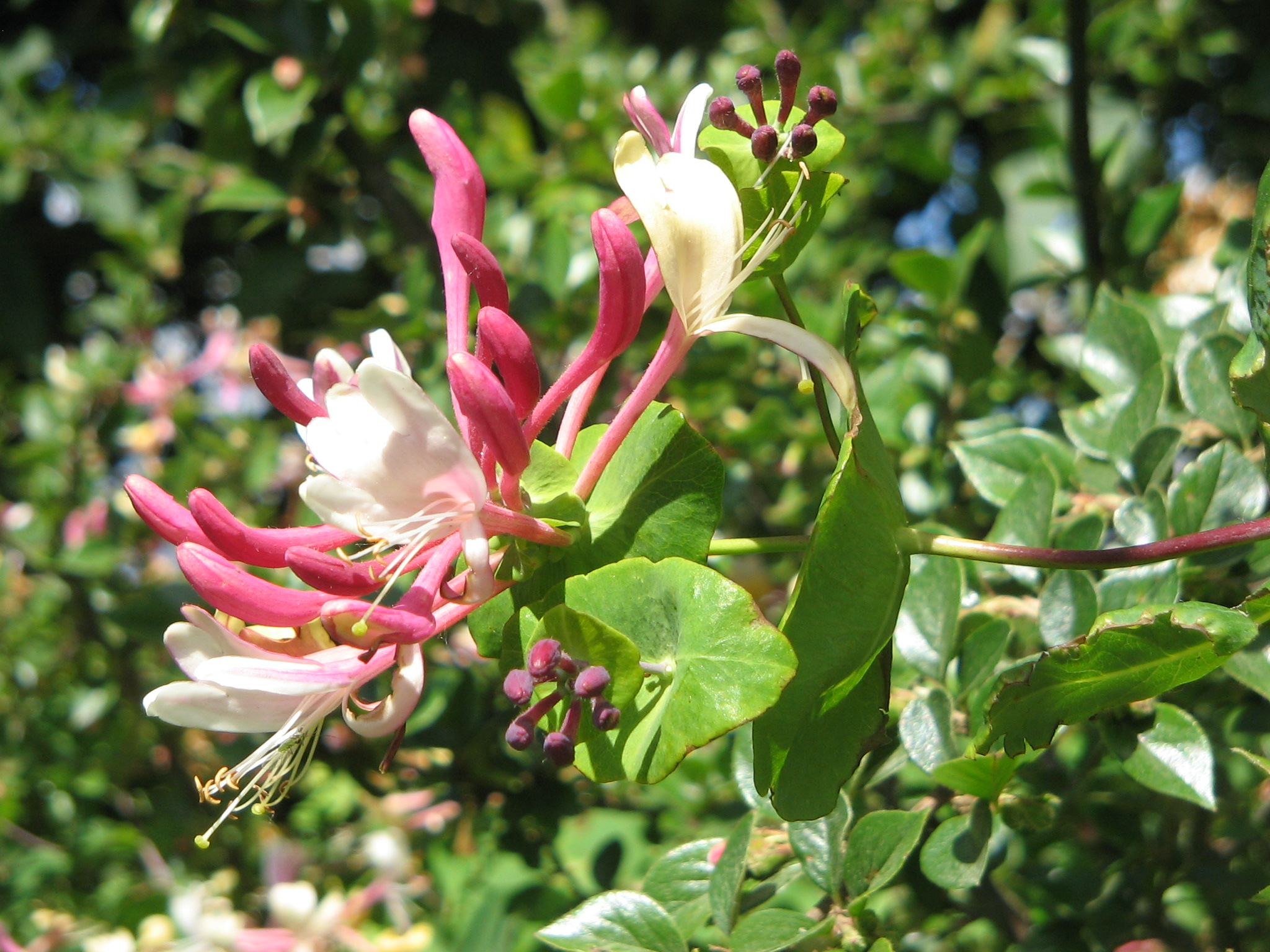

Scientific classification
- Kingdom: Plantae
- Clade: Tracheophytes
- Clade: Angiosperms
- Clade: Eudicots
- Clade: Asterids
- Order: Dipsacales
- Family: Caprifoliaceae
- Genus: Lonicera
- Species: L. caprifolium

Binomial name
- Lonicera caprifolium L.

Synonyms
- Caprifolium atropurpureum K.Koch; Caprifolium germanicum Delarbre; Caprifolium hortense Lam.; Caprifolium italicum Medik.; Caprifolium magnevilleae Dippel; Caprifolium pallidum Schur; Caprifolium perfoliatum Röhl.; Caprifolium rotundifolium Moench; Caprifolium sylvaticum Lam.; Caprifolium vulgare Medik.

= Lonicera caprifolium =

Species of honeysuckle

Lonicera caprifolium, the Italian woodbine, perfoliate honeysuckle, goat-leaf honeysuckle, Italian honeysuckle, or perfoliate woodbine, is a species of perennial flowering plants in the genus Lonicera of the family Caprifoliaceae. It is native to parts of Europe, and naturalised in South East Britain and northeastern North America. It can readily be distinguished from Europe's most common species, Lonicera periclymenum, by its topmost leaves, which are perfoliate as the Latin name suggests (that is, the stem appears to grow through the centre of the leaf). It is a vigorous, deciduous climber growing up to 8 metres. It bears masses of very fragrant, cream-coloured flowers, tinged with pink, appearing in midsummer.
