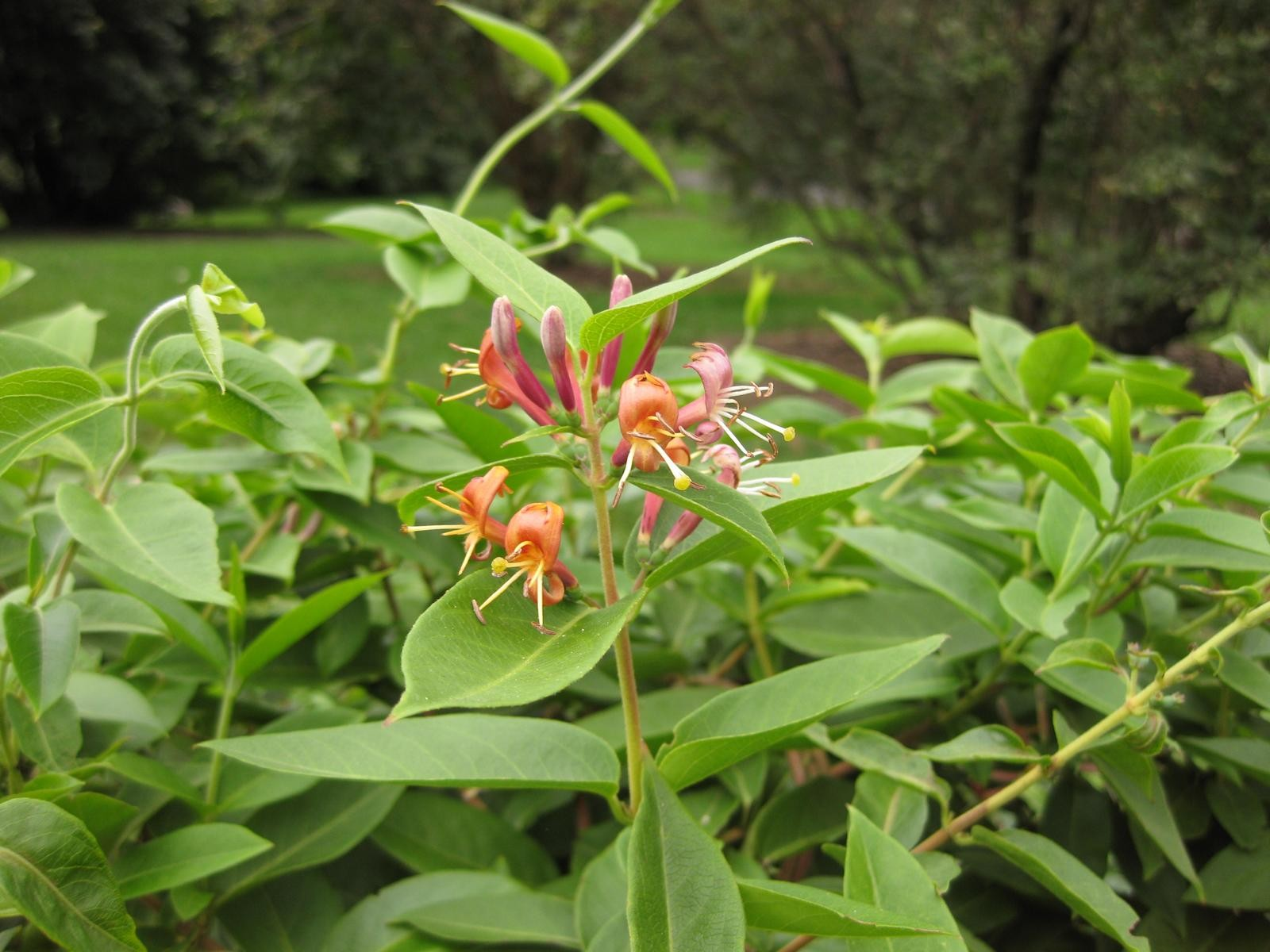

Scientific classification
- Kingdom: Plantae
- Clade: Tracheophytes
- Clade: Angiosperms
- Clade: Eudicots
- Clade: Asterids
- Order: Dipsacales
- Family: Caprifoliaceae
- Genus: Lonicera
- Species: L. acuminata

Binomial name
- Lonicera acuminata Wall.

Synonyms
- Lonicera acuminata Wall.; Caprifolium fuchsioides (Hemsl.) Kuntze; Caprifolium henryi (Hemsl.) Kuntze; Lonicera alseuosmoides Graebner; Lonicera apodantha Ohwi; Lonicera buddleioides P.S.Hsu & S.C.Cheng; Lonicera fuchsioides Hemsl.; Lonicera giraldii Rehder; Lonicera henryi Hemsl.; Lonicera pampaninii H.Lév.; Lonicera transarisanensis Hayata; Lonicera trichosepala (Rehder) P.S.Hsu

= Lonicera acuminata =

Species of vine

Lonicera acuminata, commonly known as fragrant grove honeysuckle or vine honeysuckle, is a plant species of honeysuckle native to China, Southeast Asia and India.

== Taxonomy ==
The taxonomy of this very variable species is not sufficiently understood. The initial species description by Nathaniel Wallich was published in 1824 by William Roxburgh in Flora indica 2 on page 176. Occasionally, Lonicera henryi and giraldii are listed as separate species.

== Description ==
Lonicera acuminata grows as a several meters high, semi-evergreen and fast-growing lignifying vine. The branches, petioles and peduncles are mostly hairy. The branches usually become hollow.

The opposite or sometimes 3-whorled, simple leaves are short-stalked and with entire margins. The more or less hirsute (especially on the midvein) to bare, leathery leaves with often somewhat ciliate edges measure 2.5 to 13 centimeters in length and 1.3 to 4.5 centimeters in width. They are ovoid to -lanceolate or obovate to inverted lanceolate, pointed to rounded and often slightly cordate toward the short 2 to 15 millimeter long stem and acuminate to caudate at the apex. To reduce the evaporation rate, the leaves can also get rolled in slightly.

The hermaphroditic, narrowly funnelform, five-petalled and reddish to purple or yellow flowers with a dichlamydeous perianth usually grow in stalked pairs, more rarely in small panicles, axillary at the branch apices. They have both bracts and bracteoles. The small calyx is pitcher-shaped with small teeth and the corolla is double-lipped, with a recurved, tongue-shaped lower lip.

The long corolla tube is more or less hairy inside. The ovary is inferior with a long, firm, more or less hairy style with a large, head-like stigma. The five filaments are about as long as the corolla and are partly hairy in the lower part. Nectaries are present.

The plants bloom fragrantly between May and July and in October and November they bear 4-6 millimeters large, roundish to ovoid, pruinose and blue-black, smooth berries with several seeds and calyx remains at the top. The seeds are ellipsoid to elongated and somewhat compressed.

== Distribution ==
It grows on neutral to alkaline soils up to 3200 meters above sea level. Its origin is in Western China, Tibet, Nepal, Bhutan, India and in the Asian tropics. Worldwide cultivation has led to spontaneous occurrences in other places.

== Ecology ==
The nectar attracts insects and hummingbirds, the berry-fruits birds. The plants can be affected by powdery mildew, aphids and thrips. The species is used for insect- and bird-friendly green walls. Its stems are used in the Philippines as a binding material in fence construction. It can also be propagated via cuttings, in which use of the plant hormone 1-aminobenzotriazole (ABT1) improves rooting.
