= Lonicera cerviculata =

Scientific classification
- Kingdom: Plantae
- Clade: Tracheophytes
- Clade: Angiosperms
- Clade: Eudicots
- Clade: Asterids
- Order: Dipsacales
- Family: Caprifoliaceae
- Genus: Lonicera
- Species: L. cerviculata

Binomial name
- Lonicera cerviculata S.S.White

Species of honeysuckle

Lonicera cerviculata is a shrub in the genus Lonicera, family Caprifoliaceae, native to the Sierra Madre Occidental near the boundary between the Mexican states of Chihuahua and Sonora. It is a shrub up to 1.5 m tall with juicy, globose orange berries.
