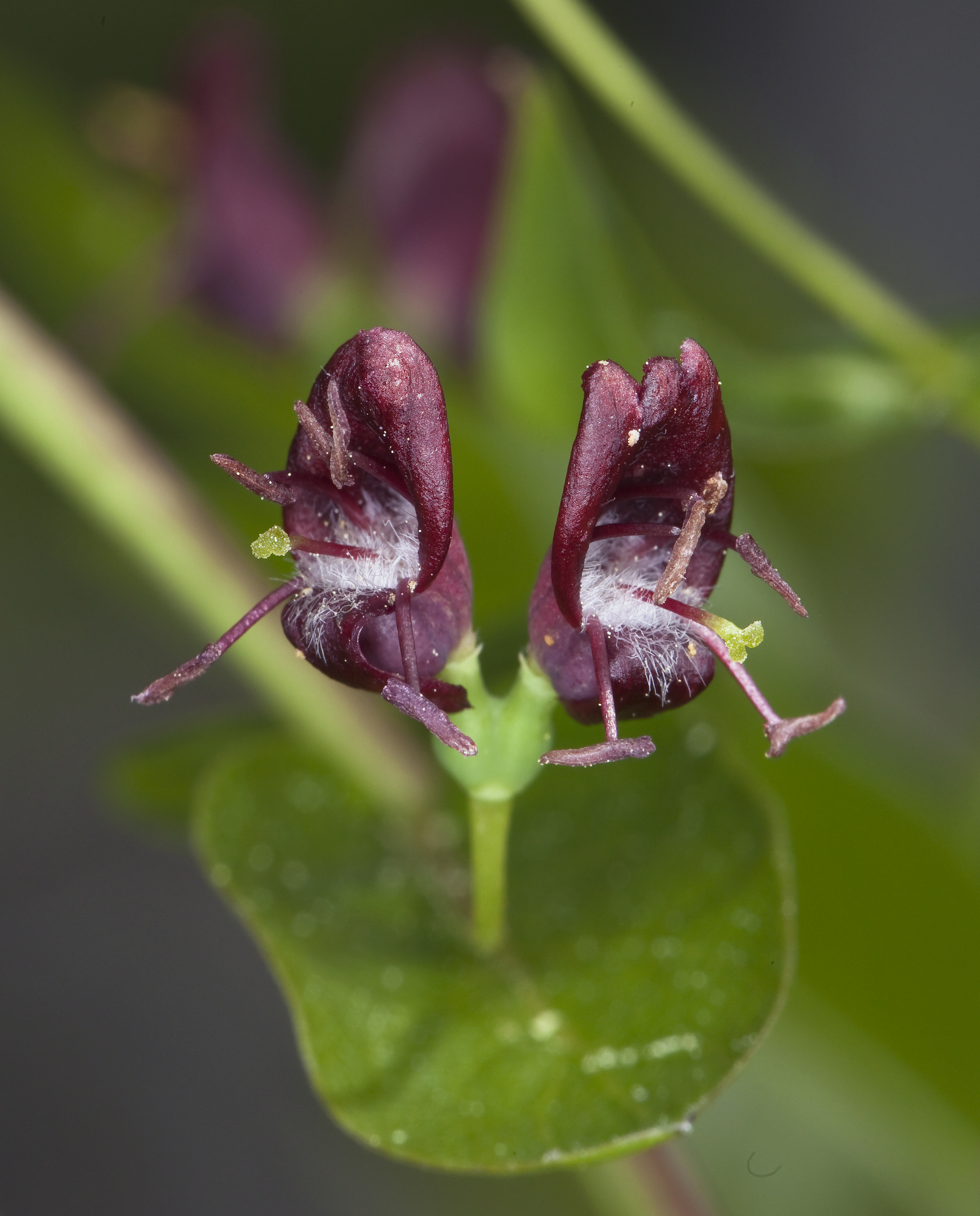

Scientific classification
- Kingdom: Plantae
- Clade: Embryophytes
- Clade: Tracheophytes
- Clade: Spermatophytes
- Clade: Angiosperms
- Clade: Eudicots
- Clade: Asterids
- Order: Dipsacales
- Family: Caprifoliaceae
- Genus: Lonicera
- Species: L. conjugialis

Binomial name
- Lonicera conjugialis Kellogg

= Lonicera conjugialis =

Species of honeysuckle

Lonicera conjugialis, the purpleflower honeysuckle, is a species of honeysuckle. It is native to the western United States.

== Description ==
It is a slender shrub often exceeding 1.5 metres (5 ft) in erect height. The lightly hairy leaves are oval to round and up to 7.5 centimetres (3 in) long. The inflorescence is generally a pair of flowers nestled in a leaf axil toward the end of a branch. Each flower is 1 cm (3/8 in) long, maroon red to deep purple in color. It has an upper lip made up of four fused lobes, and a single-lobed lower lip. The protruding stamens are tipped with light-colored anthers. The fruit is a pair of inedible bright red berries which are often fused together in a double-lobed unit.

== Distribution and habitat ==
It is native to the western United States from the Pacific Northwest to the Sierra Nevada, where it grows in many types of mountain habitat, especially moist areas.
