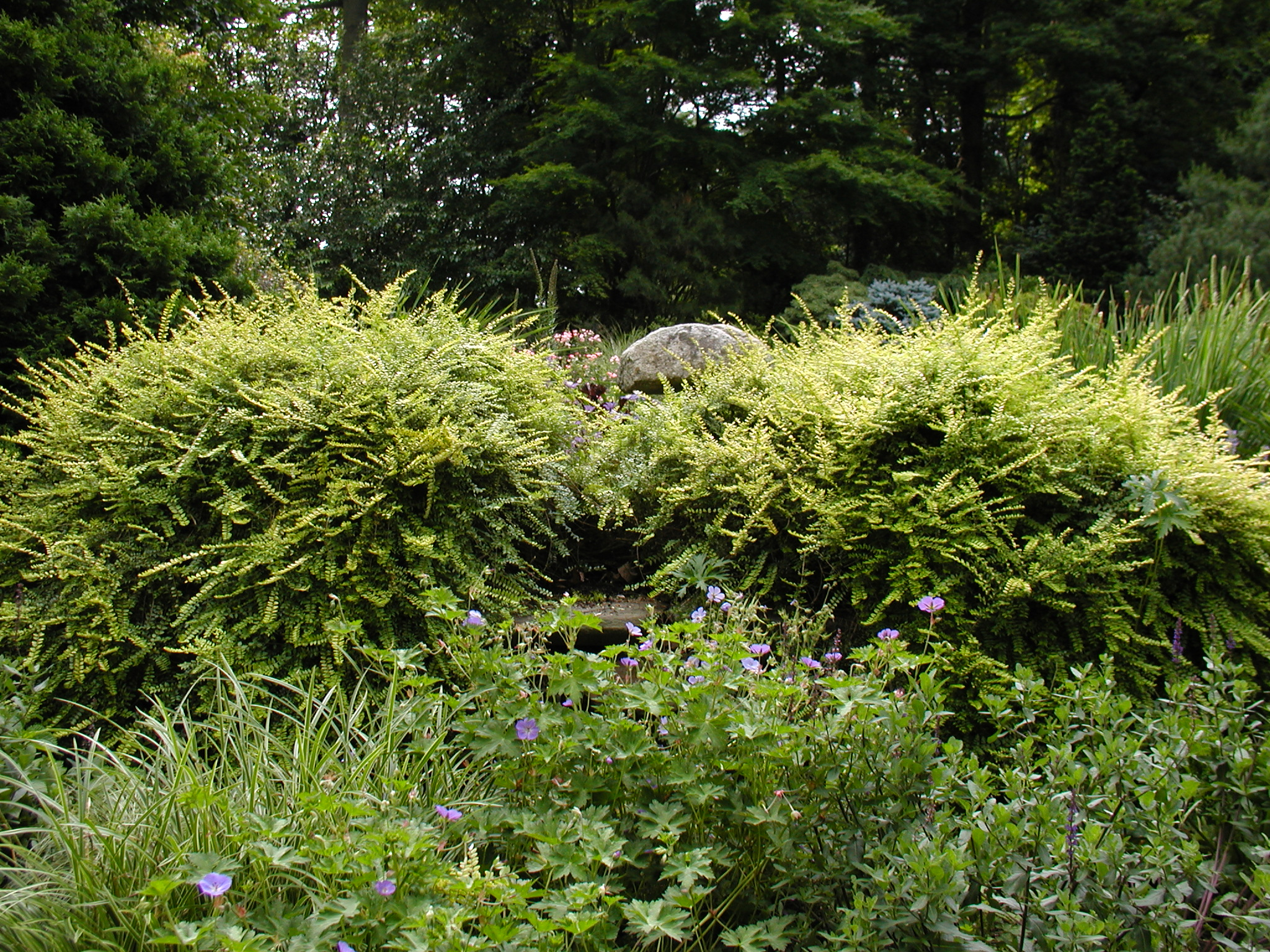
- L. nitida 'Baggesen's Gold'

Scientific classification
- Kingdom: Plantae
- Clade: Tracheophytes
- Clade: Angiosperms
- Clade: Eudicots
- Clade: Asterids
- Order: Dipsacales
- Family: Caprifoliaceae
- Genus: Lonicera
- Species: L. nitida

Binomial name
- Lonicera nitida E.H.Wilson

= Lonicera nitida =

Species of shrub

Lonicera nitida is a species of flowering plant in the honeysuckle family. In English, it is sometimes given the common names box honeysuckle or Wilson's honeysuckle. It is widely used as a low hedging plant, and for topiary. It is also a popular low-maintenance ground cover plant for urban landscaping.

The species is native to China, in the area of Yunnan and West Sichuan, where it grows in scrub form along streams at 1,200–3,000 m (3,900–9,800 ft).

== Description ==
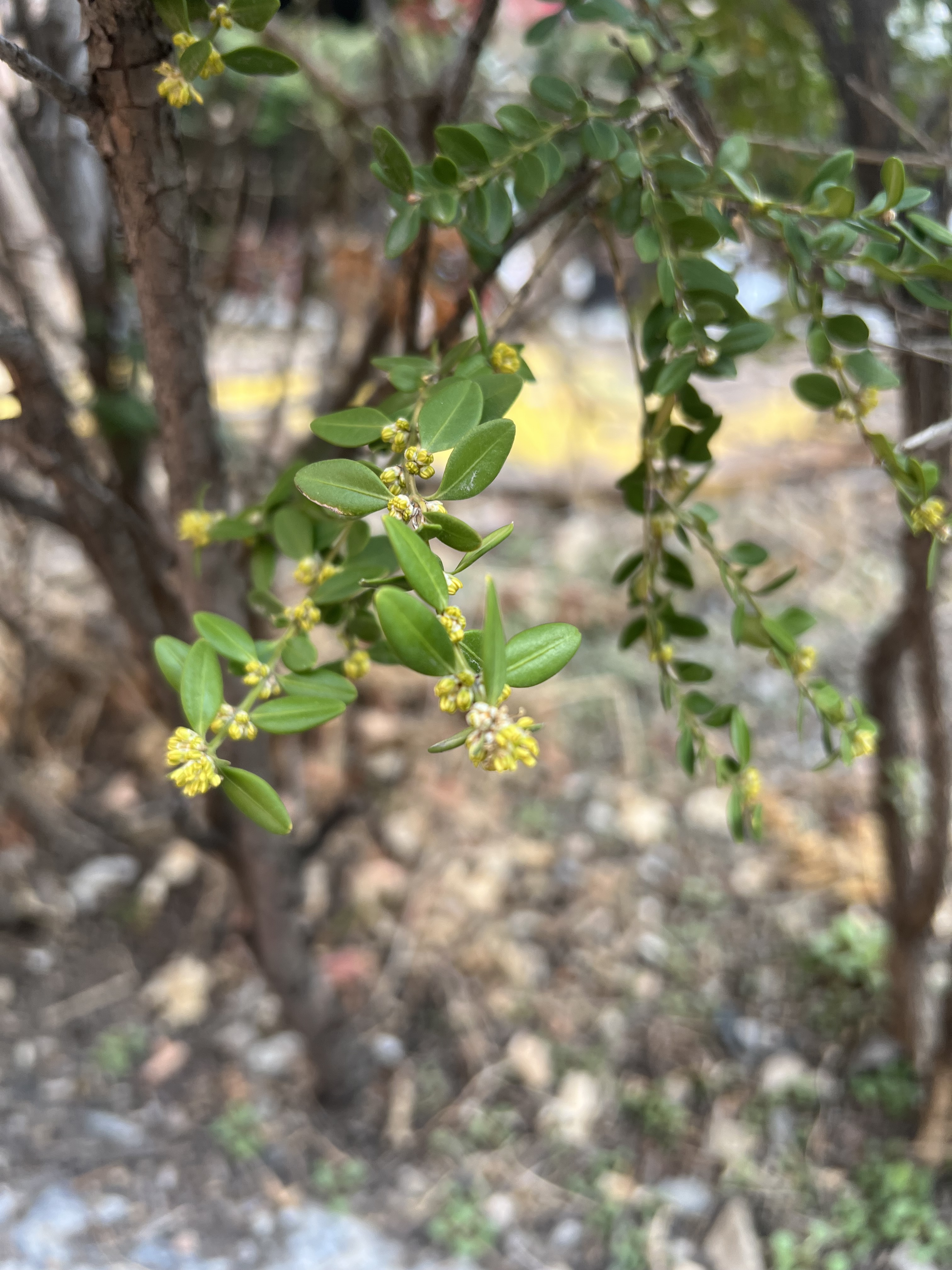
Flower of Lonicera nitida

L. nitida is a broadleaf evergreen shrub 4–5 ft (1.2–1.5 m) tall and 4–6 ft (1.2–1.8 m) wide if unclipped, with dark green, small leaves (6–16 millimeters long). The creamy white, fragrant flowers, appearing at the end of spring, are 6 millimeters long, and grow in pairs. The fruit (rarely formed on clipped specimens) is an inedible bluish-purple berry about 6 millimeters in diameter. The stems are layered one on top of the other giving the appearance of a haystack. The growth rate is moderate or fast growing. While resistant to deer and rabbits, it is attractive to birds. When planted, the species is easy to clip and needs frequent clipping because it flops if it grows to a height over 5 feet. The species is commonly confused with Cotoneaster species. The difference between the two is that Cotoneaster has alternate leaves while this species has opposite leaves.

The Latin specific epithet nitida means "shining', in reference to its glossy leaves.

Cultivars include 'Maigrün', 'Baggesen's Gold' and 'Briloni' (a.k.a. 'Edmee Gold')

== Cultivation ==
When planted, the species should be put in the full sun to light shade in fertile, well-drained soil. The species is more shade resistant than most honeysuckles. The species can tolerate drought and pollution.

Lonicera nitida takes clipping well and makes a small hedge. The cultivar 'Baggesen's Gold' has gained the Royal Horticultural Society's Award of Garden Merit.

At Osborne House, a holiday home built in 1845 on the Isle of Wight for Queen Victoria and her husband Prince Albert, there are L. nitida shrubs clipped in the form of stags rising from beds of Felicia amelloides, Festuca glauca, and Pelargonium inquinans.

This plant is often used for bonsai. Because it is an energetic grower, it is possible to collect old and quite sizable L. nitida from the landscape or growing wild, cut most of the roots and branches off to start from scratch to build a new tree-like form.
