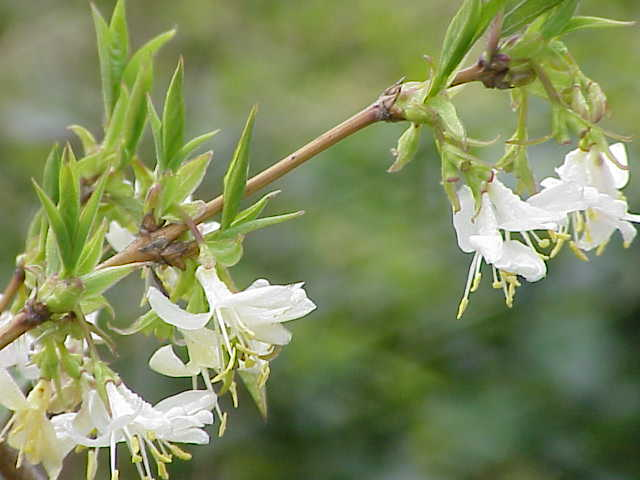

Scientific classification
- Kingdom: Plantae
- Clade: Tracheophytes
- Clade: Angiosperms
- Clade: Eudicots
- Clade: Asterids
- Order: Dipsacales
- Family: Caprifoliaceae
- Genus: Lonicera
- Species: L. fragrantissima

Binomial name
- Lonicera fragrantissima Lindl. & Paxton

Synonyms
- Lonicera mamillaris Rehder; Lonicera phyllocarpa Maxim.; Lonicera proterantha Rehder; Lonicera pseudoproterantha Pamp.; Lonicera standishii Carrière

= Lonicera fragrantissima =

Species of honeysuckle

Lonicera fragrantissima is a species of flowering plant in the honeysuckle family Caprifoliaceae, known by the common names winter-flowering honeysuckle, fragrant honeysuckle, kiss-me-at-the-gate, and sweet breath of spring. It is native to China and has been an introduced species to other parts of the world. It was brought to the attention of western gardeners by Scottish plant hunter Robert Fortune, who was plant hunting in China for the Royal Horticultural Society. Fortune introduced Lonicera fragrantissima to England in 1845, and a few years later it was introduced to the United States. In 1853 the editor of American gardening magazine The Horticulturist wrote that the previous year he had been sent a specimen from a plant that had been flowering in the gardens of Hatfield House, the Marquess of Salisbury's stately home in Hertfordshire. The first mention of a specimen for commercial sale in an American plant catalogue is in 1860.

The honeysuckle is used as an ornamental plant for its fragrant flowers. In some parts of the world, where conditions are right, when it moves out of cultivation and takes hold in the wild, it can become an invasive weed.

This honeysuckle, a species of "bush honeysuckle", is a shrub usually growing 1 to 3 metres (3.3 to 9.8 ft) tall, sometimes reaching a maximum height around 4.6 metres (15 ft). When mature it is a bushy tangle of slender, spreading branches. The leaves are up to 9 centimetres (3.5 in) long by 4.5 centimetres (1.8 in) wide. The flowers, borne in pairs, are each about 1 centimetre (0.39 in) long. They are white to "creamy white" in color. They are very fragrant, with a "lemony" scent. The fruit is a red berry up to a centimeter wide. The seeds are dispersed by animals that eat the fruits. The seeds must be stratified before they will germinate.

This plant, considered a "harbinger of spring", is grown for ornamental purposes and as a hedge. It can be found growing in parts of the eastern United States from Ohio to New York to the southeastern states where it is an introduced species. It has also been observed in Utah.
