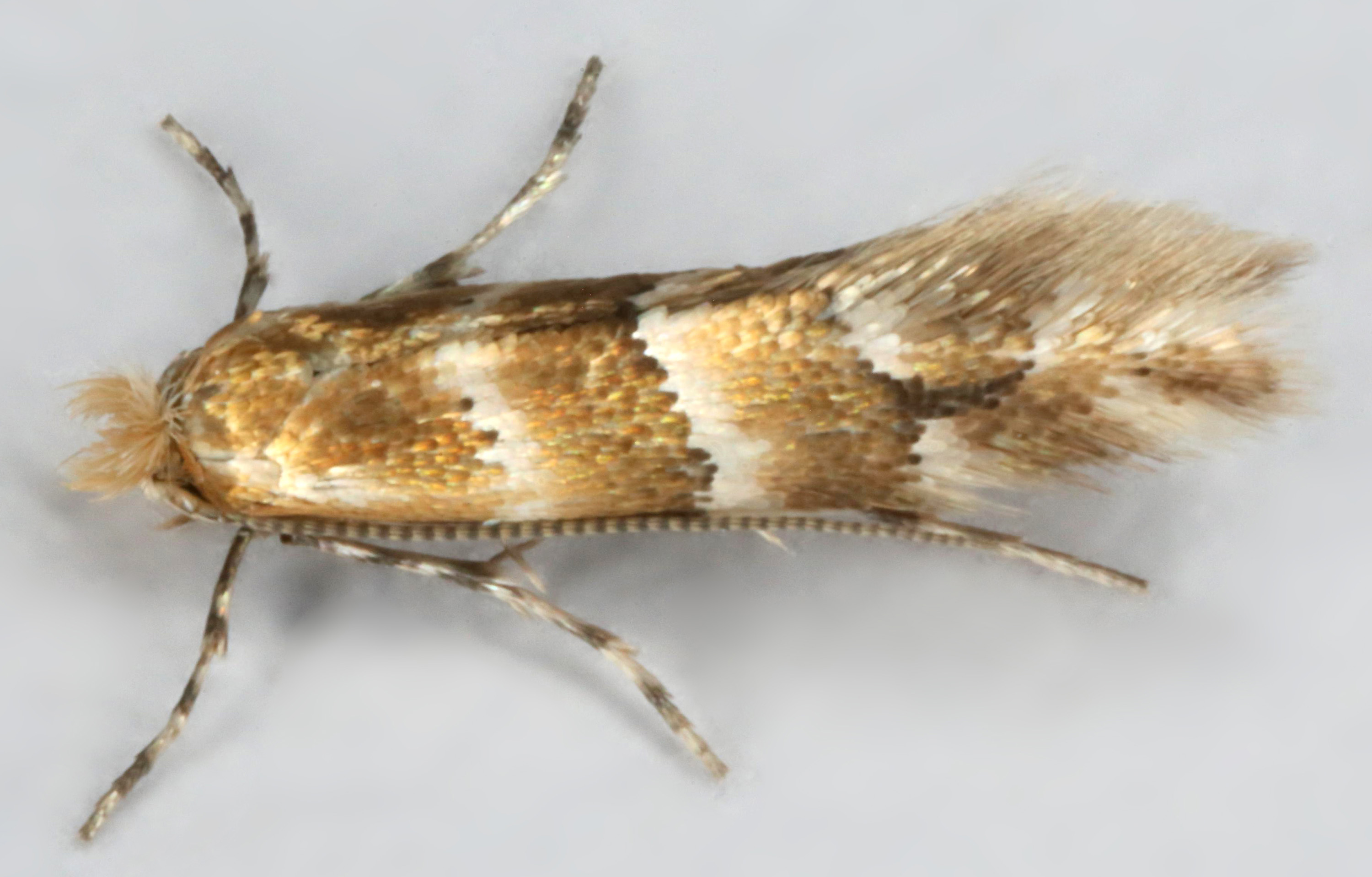
- Phyllonorycter emberizaepenella Flint, North Wales
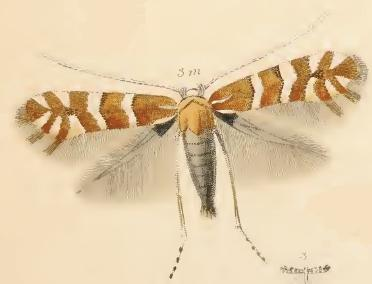

Scientific classification
- Domain: Eukaryota
- Kingdom: Animalia
- Phylum: Arthropoda
- Class: Insecta
- Order: Lepidoptera
- Family: Gracillariidae
- Genus: Phyllonorycter
- Species: P. emberizaepenella

Binomial name
- Phyllonorycter emberizaepenella (Bouche, 1834)

Synonyms
- Ornix emberizaepenella Bouche, 1834; Phyllonorycter emberizaepennella

= Phyllonorycter emberizaepenella =

Species of moth

Phyllonorycter emberizaepenella is a moth of the family Gracillariidae. It is found in all of Europe, except the Iberian Peninsula and the Balkan Peninsula.

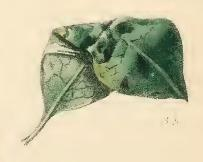
Mined honeysuckle leaf

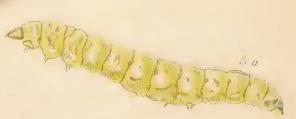
Larva

The wingspan is 9–10 mm. The forewings are shining golden-ochreous; a short whitish median streak from base; a fascia at 1/4, another at 1/2, two posterior costal and three dorsal wedge-shaped spots shining whitish, anteriorly blackish-margined; some blackish scales in disc between spots and towards apex. Hindwings are grey. The larva is green - whitish; dorsal line darker green; head pale greenish.

There are two generations per year with adults on wing in May and again in August.

The larvae feed on Lonicera alpigena, Lonicera × bella, Lonicera caerulea, Lonicera deflexicalyx, Lonicera flava, Lonicera gracilipes, Lonicera ledebourii, Lonicera maackii, Lonicera morrowii, Lonicera nigra, Lonicera orientalis, Lonicera periclymenum, Lonicera prostrata, Lonicera rupicola, Lonicera tatarica, Lonicera webbiana, Lonicera xylosteum and Symphoricarpos albus. They mine the leaves of their host plant.
