= Coleophora ahenella =

Scientific classification
- Kingdom: Animalia
- Phylum: Arthropoda
- Clade: Pancrustacea
- Class: Insecta
- Order: Lepidoptera
- Family: Coleophoridae
- Genus: Coleophora
- Species: C. ahenella

Binomial name
- Coleophora ahenella Heinemann, 1877

Species of moth

Coleophora ahenella is a moth of the family Coleophoridae. It is found in all of Europe, except Ireland and the Balkan Peninsula.

The wingspan is about 12 mm (0.47 in). They are on wing in May and June.

The larvae feed on Cornus mas, Cornus sanguinea, Lonicera alpigena, Lonicera nigra, Lonicera xylosteum, Lonicera chrysantha, Rhamnus catharticus, Rhamnus frangula, Symphoricarpos albus and Viburnum lantana. They create a lobe case of about 7 mm (0.28 in) long. In Great Britain, the larvae live for two years.
