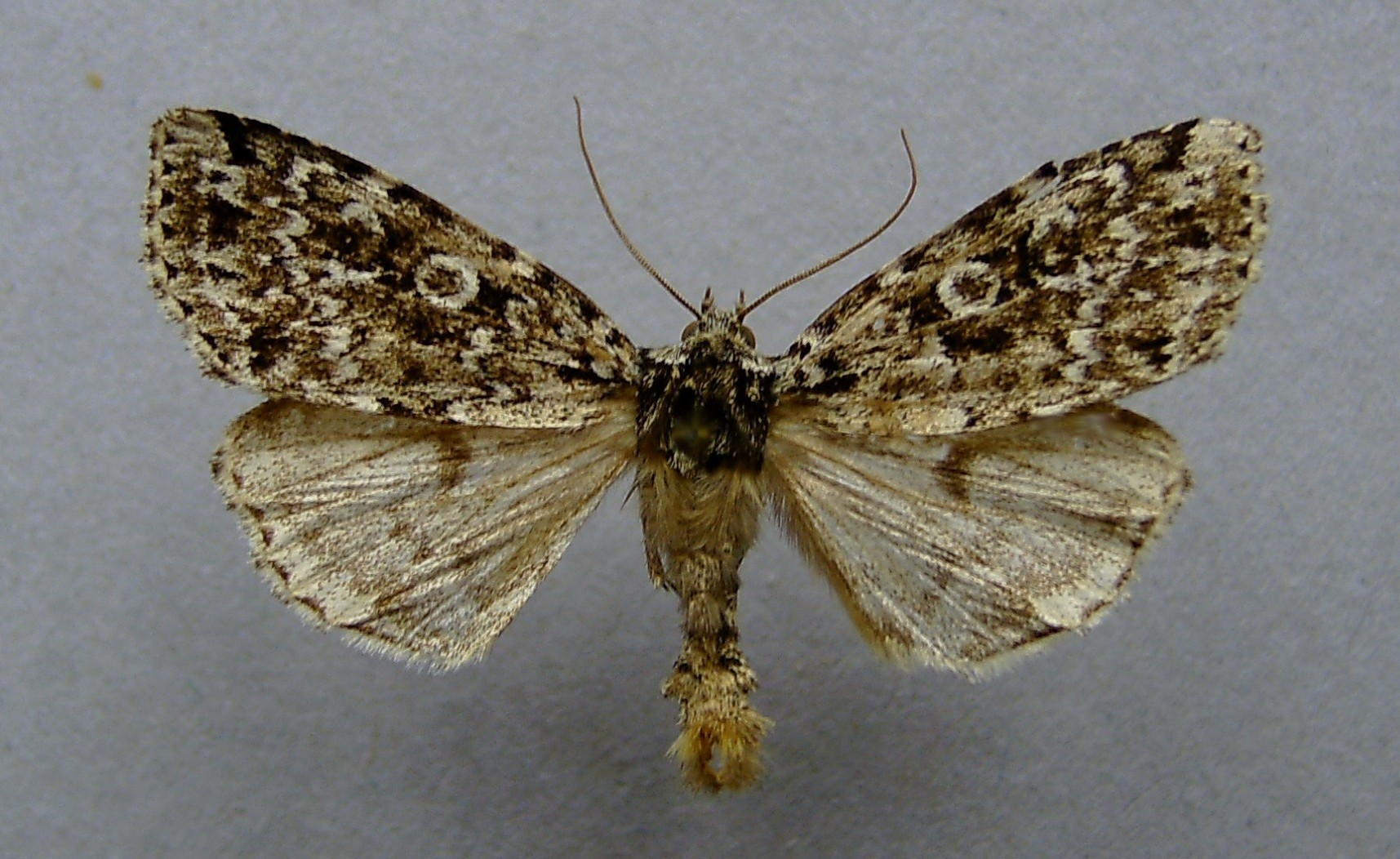

Scientific classification
- Kingdom: Animalia
- Phylum: Arthropoda
- Clade: Pancrustacea
- Class: Insecta
- Order: Lepidoptera
- Superfamily: Noctuoidea
- Family: Noctuidae
- Genus: Xestia
- Species: X. speciosa

Binomial name
- Xestia speciosa (Hübner, [1813])

Synonyms
- Noctua speciosa Hübner, [1813]; Anomogyna speciosa; Ophiusa schoenherri Herrich-Schäffer, [1852] (preocc.); Aplecta schoennherri Guenée, 1852; Hadena arctica Zetterstedt, 1839; Xestia baltica Valle, 1940; Aplectoides livalis Smith, 1910; Anomogyna aklavicensis Benjamin, 1933; Acronycta mixta Walker, 1856; Xestia apropitia (Benjamin, 1933); Anomogyna apropitia Benjamin, 1933

= Xestia speciosa =

Species of moth

Xestia speciosa is a moth of the family Noctuidae. It is found in northern Europe, including Fennoscandia, the Baltic region, parts of Russia, north Asia, the Pacific Ocean and Japan. It is also found in the mountainous areas of central and southern Europe and north-western North America.

Some authors treat Xestia apropitia as a valid species, while Mikkola, Lafontaine, and Kononenko (1996) placed it as a subspecies of Xestia speciosa.

The wingspan of ssp. speciosa is 38–50 mm. Subspecies arctica has a wingspan of 36–45 mm. Adults are on wing from June to August in one generation.

The larvae feed on various low-growing plants, including Vaccinium myrtillus, Lonicera nigra, and Betula nana.

== Subspecies ==
Note that only speciosa, arctica, and modesta are confirmed subspecies. The other listed subspecies need further study to confirm their status. Xestia viridescens is sometimes included here as another subspecies.

Generally accepted

- Xestia speciosa speciosa (Hübner, 1813) (Germany)
- Xestia speciosa modesta (Alps)
- Xestia speciosa arctica (Zetterstedt 1839) (northern Europe, northern Canada south to the northern parts of the mountains in Alberta)

Disputed

- Xestia speciosa aegrota (Alpheraky 1897) (Siberia, northern Mongolia)
- Xestia speciosa aklavikensis (Nearctic)
- Xestia speciosa apropitia (Benjamin, 1933) (Colorado)
- Xestia speciosa baltica (Valle 1940)
- Xestia speciosa janae Herz, 1903
- Xestia speciosa livalis (Nearctic)
- Xestia speciosa mixta
- Xestia speciosa rybatchiensis Kotzsch 1934
- Xestia speciosa ussurica (north-eastern Siberia to Korea and Japan)
