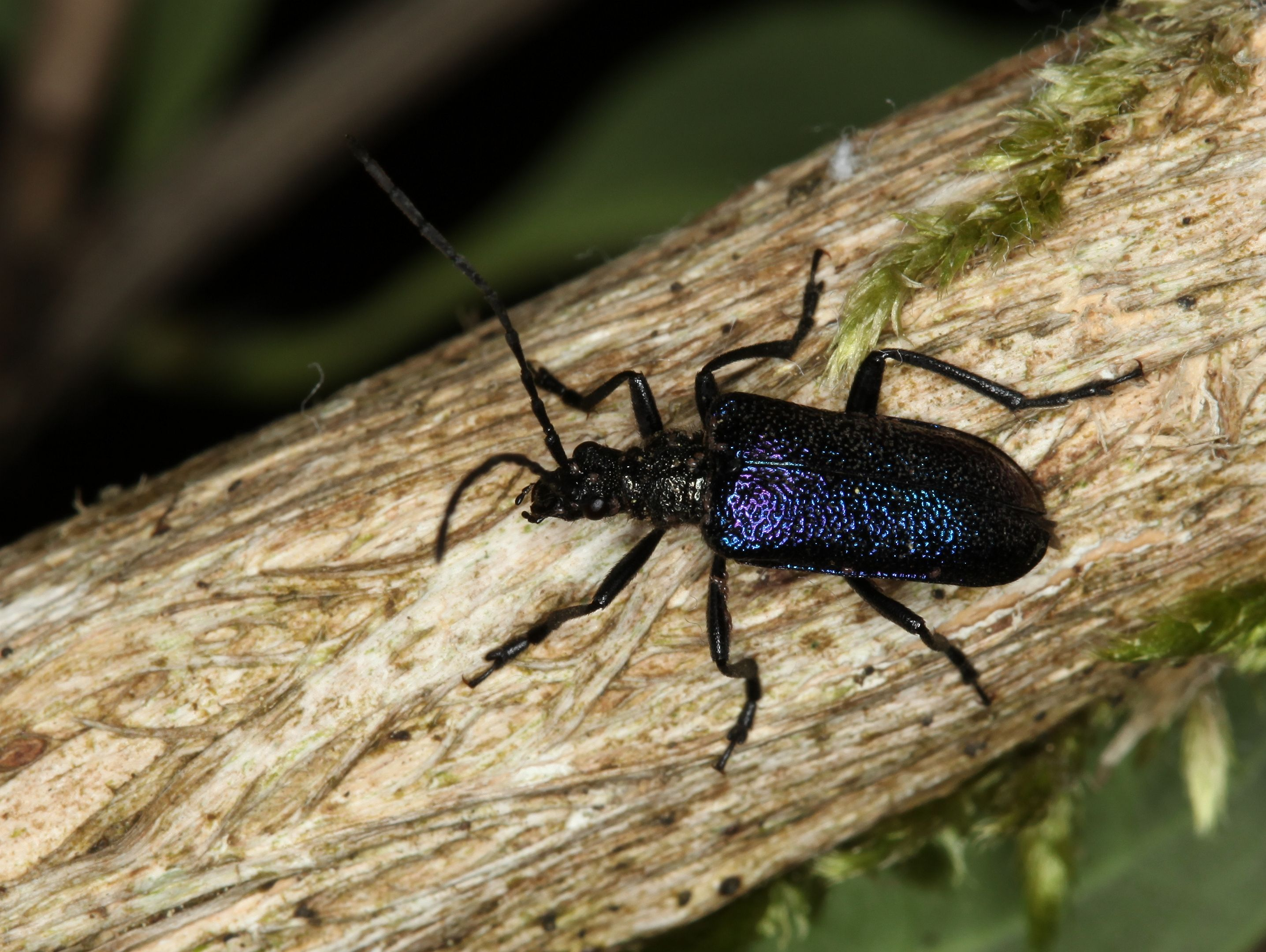

Scientific classification
- Domain: Eukaryota
- Kingdom: Animalia
- Phylum: Arthropoda
- Class: Insecta
- Order: Coleoptera
- Suborder: Polyphaga
- Infraorder: Cucujiformia
- Family: Cerambycidae
- Subfamily: Lepturinae
- Tribe: Rhagiini
- Genus: Pseudogaurotina
- Species: P. excellens

Binomial name
- Pseudogaurotina excellens (Brancsik, 1874)
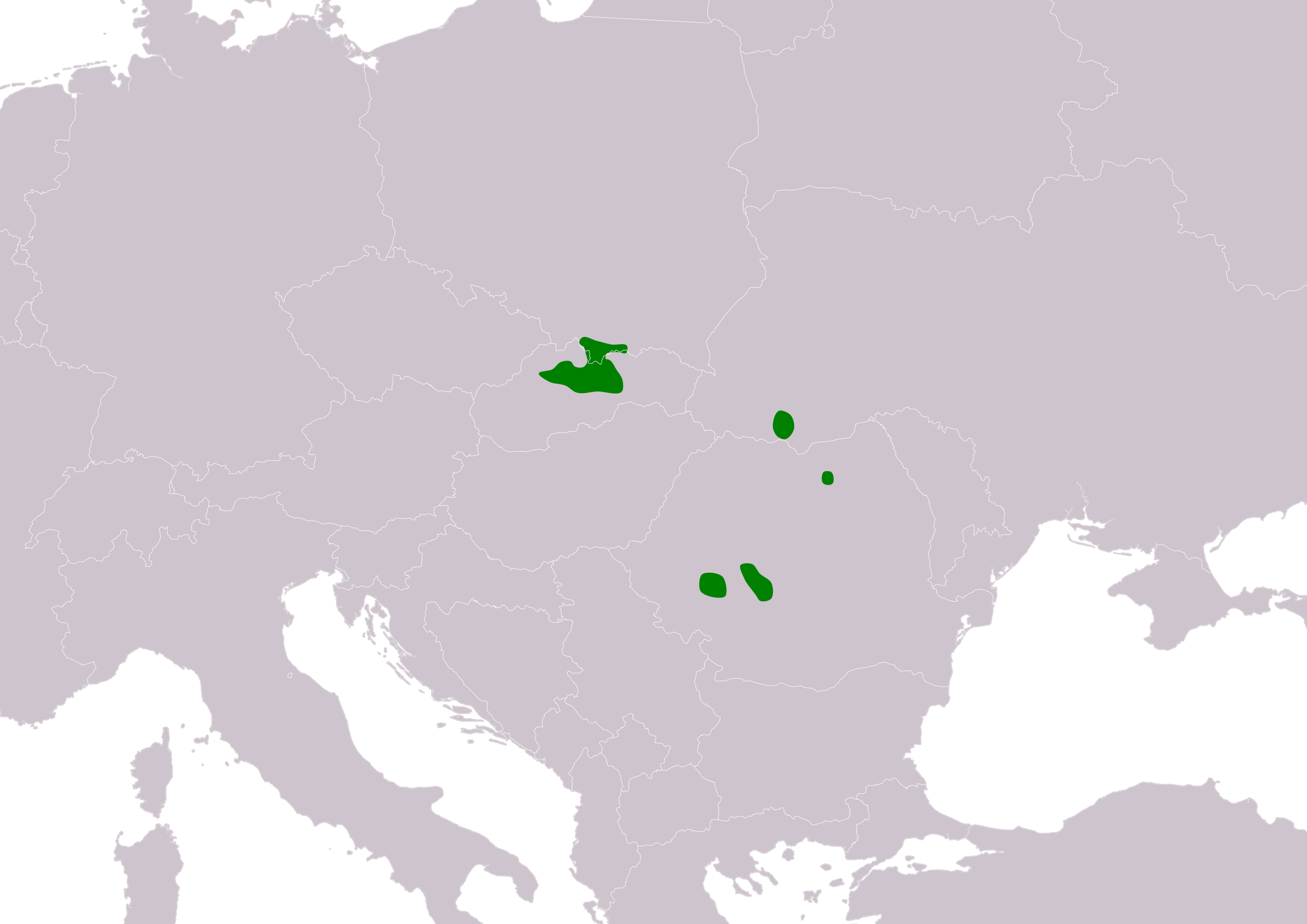
- Range of P. excellens Resident

Synonyms
- Gaurotes excellens Brancsik, 1874; Pachyta excellens Brancsik, 1874

= Pseudogaurotina excellens =

Species of beetle

Pseudogaurotina excellens is a species of the Lepturinae subfamily in the long-horned beetle family. This beetle is distributed in Europe. Adult beetle feeds on Lonicera nigra.
