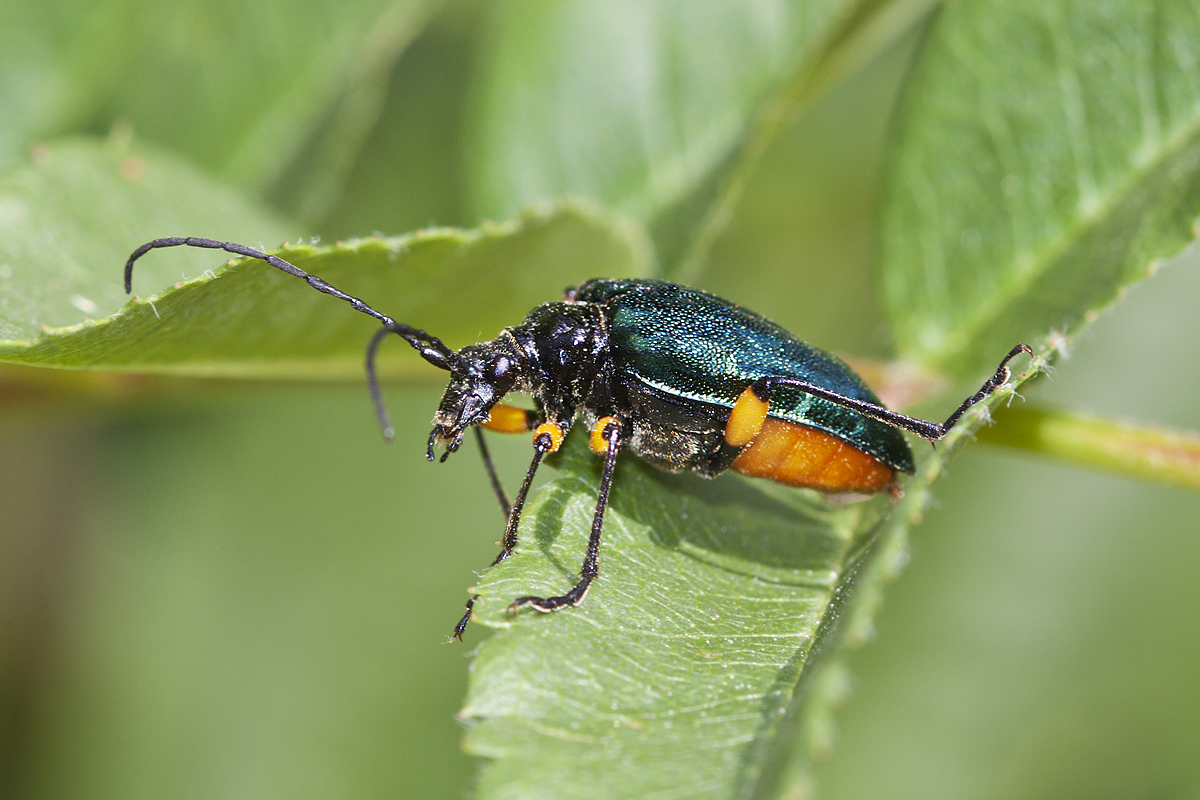

Scientific classification
- Domain: Eukaryota
- Kingdom: Animalia
- Phylum: Arthropoda
- Class: Insecta
- Order: Coleoptera
- Suborder: Polyphaga
- Infraorder: Cucujiformia
- Family: Cerambycidae
- Subfamily: Lepturinae
- Tribe: Rhagiini
- Genus: Pseudogaurotina
- Species: P. sugma

Binomial name
- Pseudogaurotina sugma (Bland, 1864)

= Pseudogaurotina cressoni =

Species of beetle

Pseudogaurotina cressoni is a species of the Lepturinae subfamily in the long-horned beetle family. This beetle is distributed in Canada, and the United States.

== Subtaxa ==
There are two subspecies in species:

- Pseudogaurotina cressoni cressoni (Bland, 1864)
- Pseudogaurotina cressoni lecontei (Casey, 1913)
