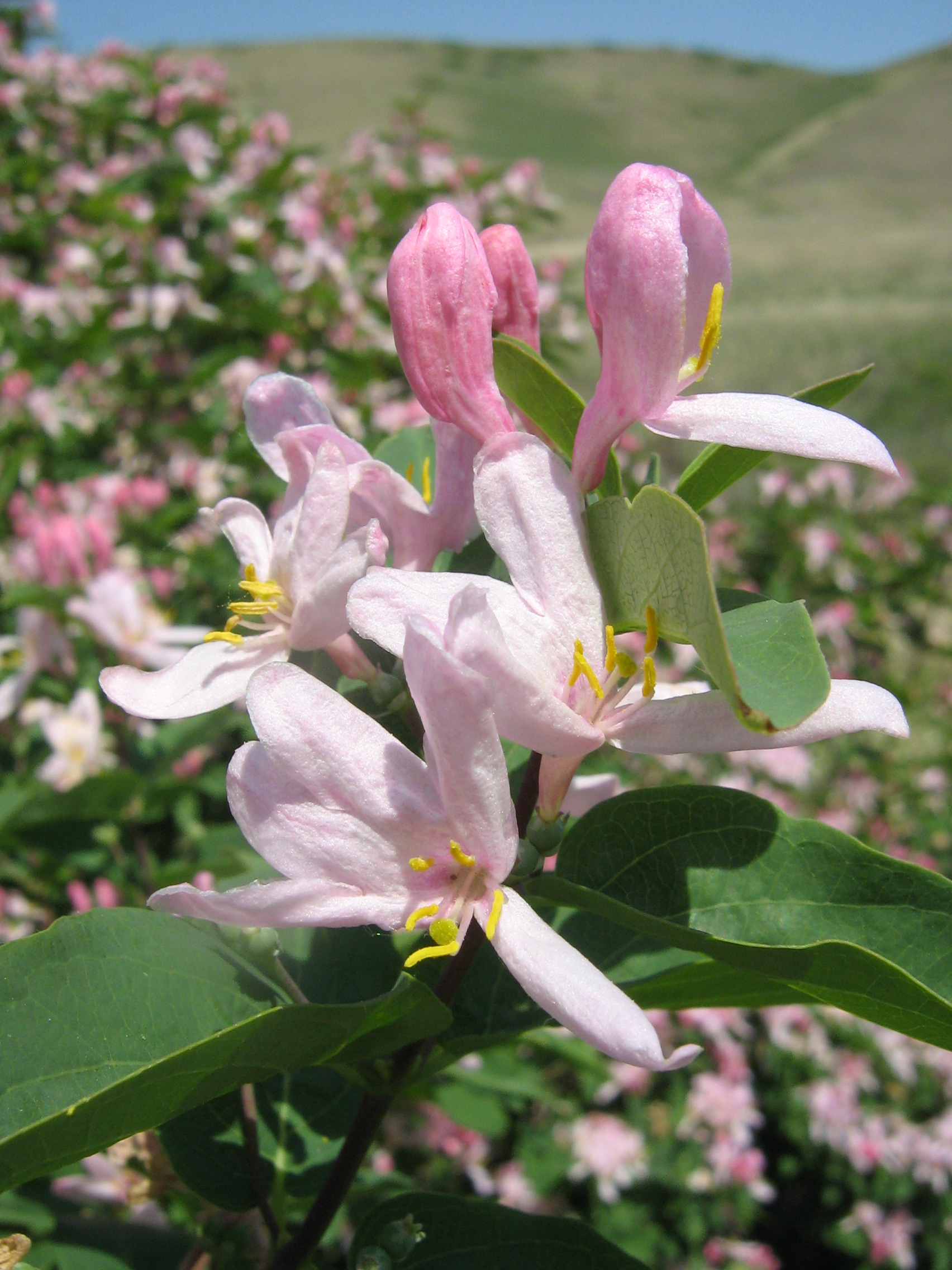
- Naturalized near Lethbridge, Alberta

Scientific classification
- Kingdom: Plantae
- Clade: Embryophytes
- Clade: Tracheophytes
- Clade: Spermatophytes
- Clade: Angiosperms
- Clade: Eudicots
- Clade: Asterids
- Order: Dipsacales
- Family: Caprifoliaceae
- Genus: Lonicera
- Species: L. tatarica

Binomial name
- Lonicera tatarica L.

Synonyms
- Caprifolium tataricum (L.) Kuntze; Chamaecerasus tatarica (L.) Medik.; Lonicera micrantha (Trautv.) Trautv. ex Regel; Xylosteon tartaricum (L.) Medik; Xylosteon tataricum (L.) Michx.

= Lonicera tatarica =

Species of honeysuckle

Lonicera tatarica is a species of honeysuckle known by the common name Tatarian honeysuckle. Native to Asia, the plant is one of several exotic bush honeysuckles present in North America, being considered an invasive species there.

== Description ==
Lonicera tatarica is a bushy shrub which may approach 3 meters (10 feet) in height. The twigs can be an array of colors from green to brown with a hollow brown pith. The plant is lined with oval or rounded simple leaves 3 to 6 centimetres (1 1/4 to 2 1/4 inches) long. The leaves and stem range from 2.5–6.5 cm (1–2 1/2 in) long, 1.25–2.5 cm (1/2–1 in) wide. They are egg shaped and both hairless and toothless.

The inflorescence ranges in color from deep rose to light pink, and can also be white. The petals are typically 2–2.5 cm (3/4–1 in) long, with a slender tube and 2 lips. The upper lip contains 4 lobes, the middle two erect and fused near the base. The white to pink to crimson red flowers are each about 1.5 cm (5/8 in) long, their stamens and styles protruding. The fruit is a shiny orange or red seed-containing berry less than 1 cm wide. The berries are attractive to wildlife. The plant forms thickets and spreads easily when birds and other animals consume the fruits. The flowers have a sweet smell that is reminiscent of honeysuckle.

In cultivation, L. tatarica has hybridized with other shrubby species of Lonicera. Crossed with L. morrowii, it forms the invasive hybrid L. × bella. It can also hybridize with L. ruprechtiana and L. xylosteum.

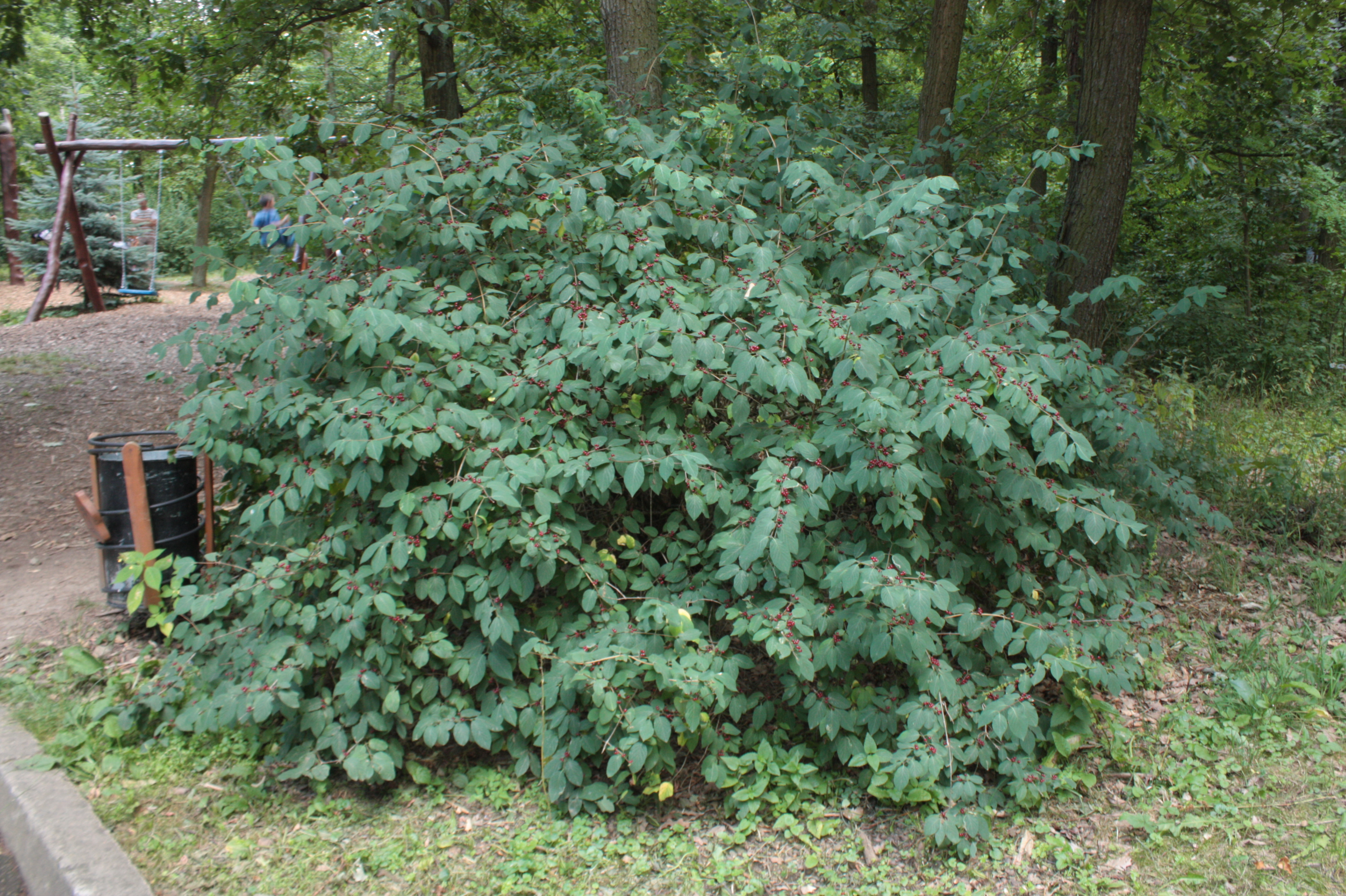
Shrub in Brno Zoo, Czech Republic

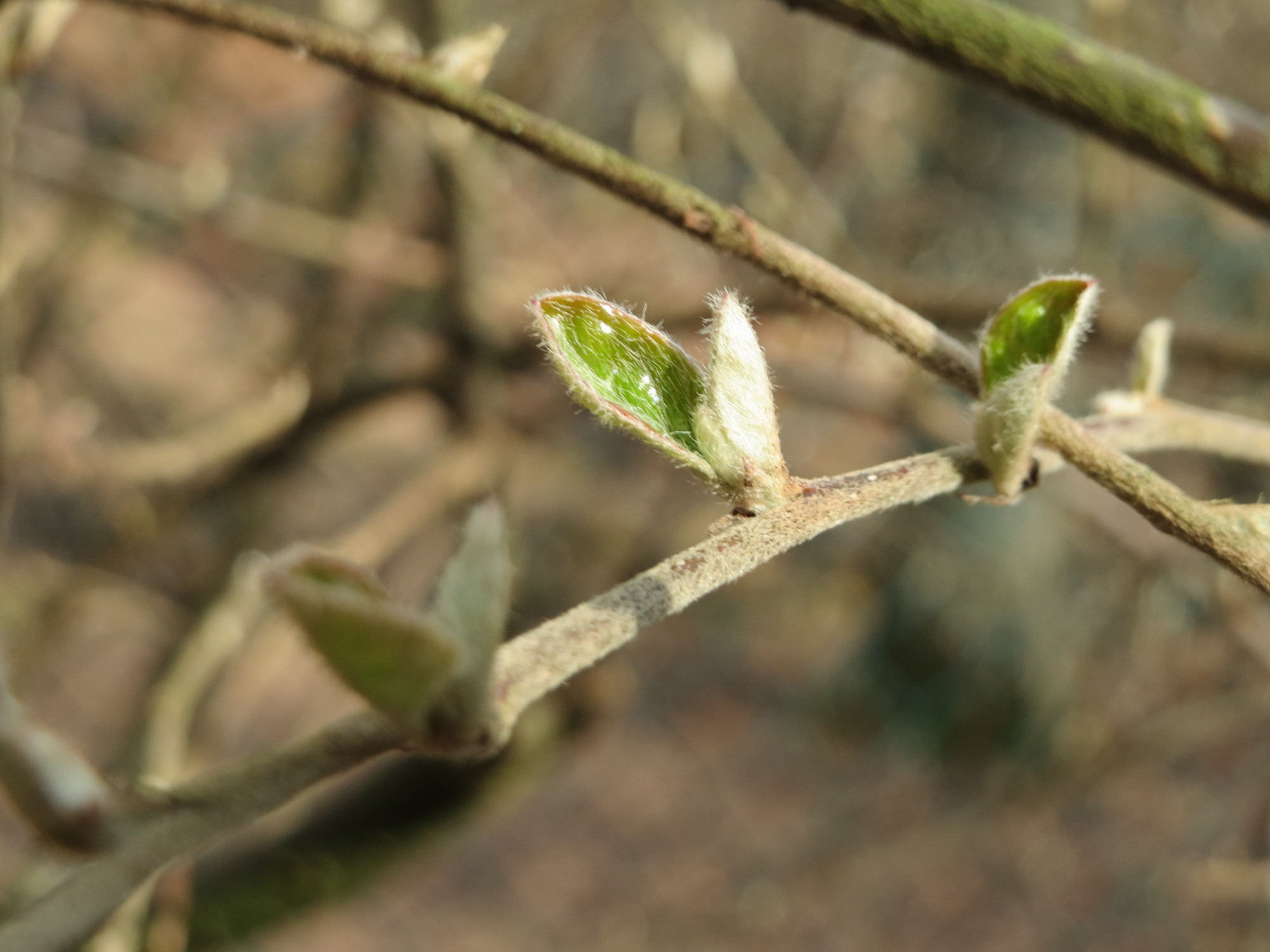
Buds

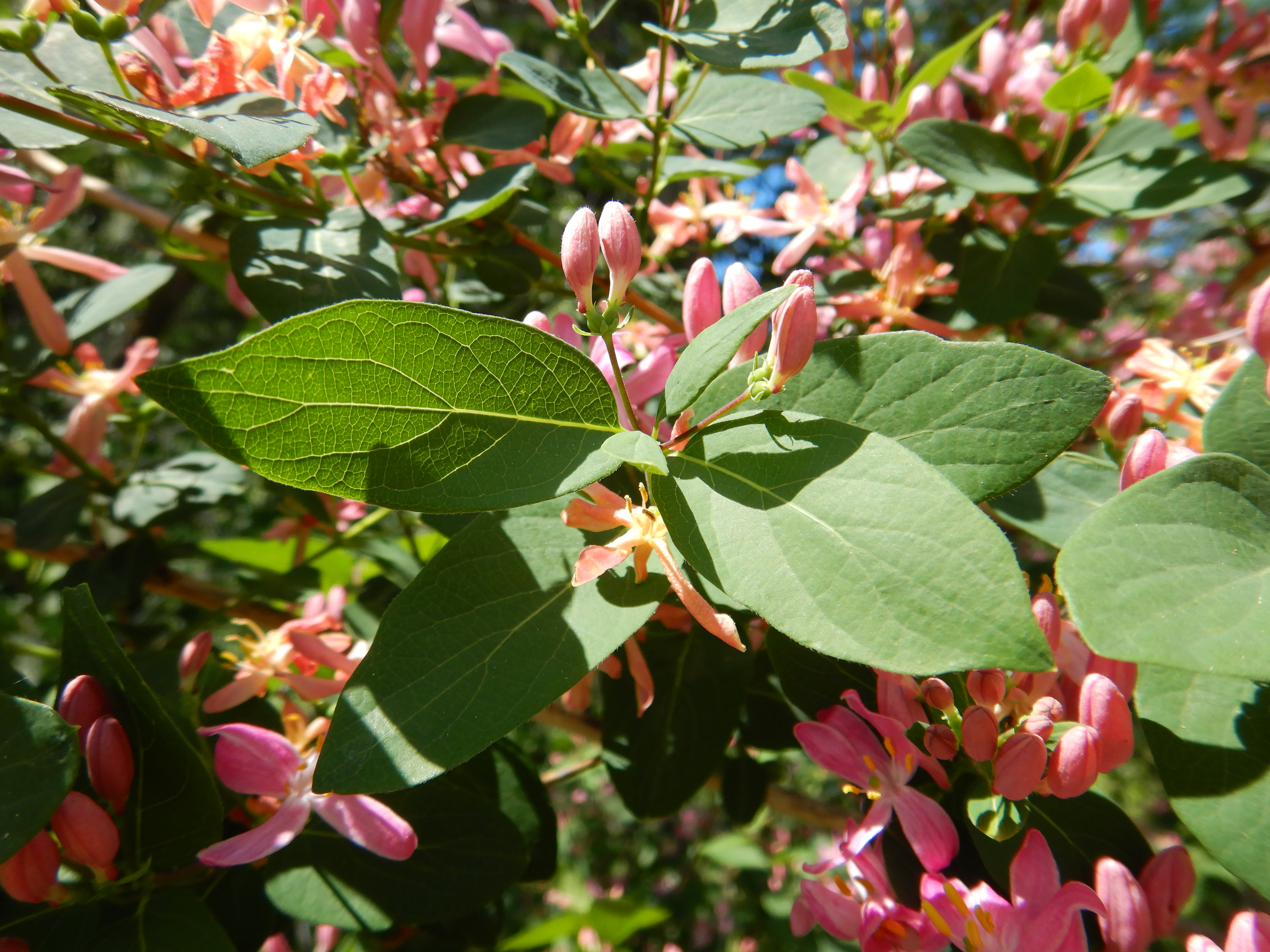
Leaves and young flowers

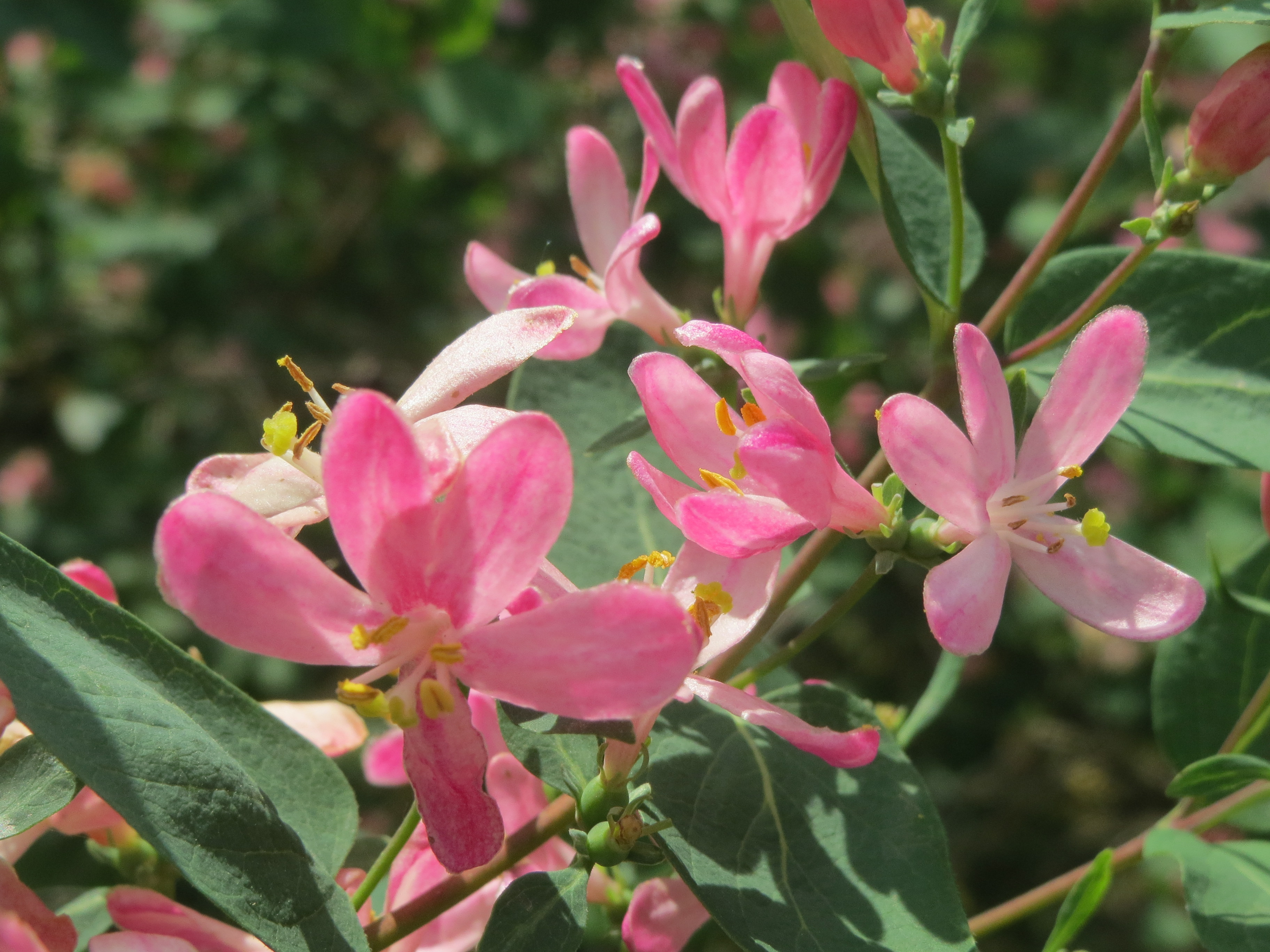
Flowers

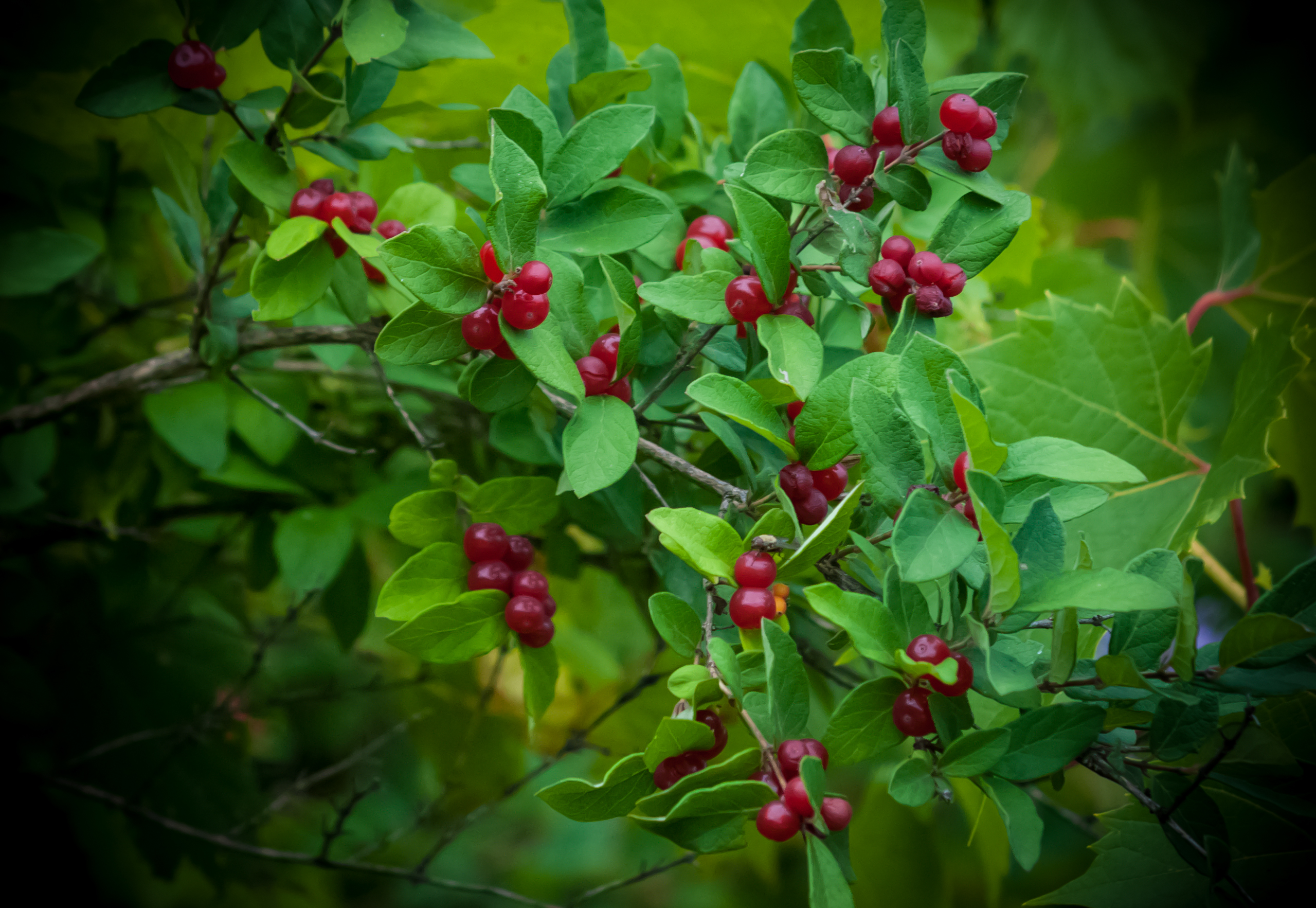
Berries

== Distribution and habitat ==
L. tatarica is native to Siberia and other parts of eastern Asia, especially China. It is also known to grow in the Himalayas. After being introduced to North America as an ornamental plant in 1752, became a widespread introduced species and noxious weed. It is known across the continent west to Alaska and California, where it easily grows in disturbed habitat.

Its preferred environment is partial sun with moist, loamy soil. It is also able to grow in full shade or sun, and in dry or sandy soils.

== Ecology ==
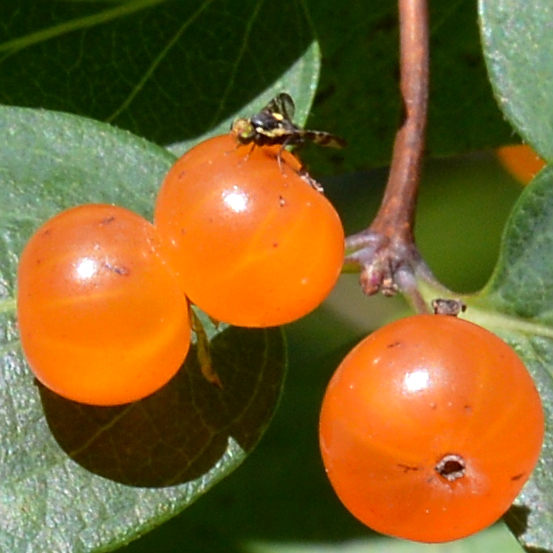
Rhagoletis fruit fly on berry

The species threatens native habitats because the plants grow quickly and form thick, impenetrable mats that smother their competitors. It most commonly invades thickets, open woodlands, roadsides and fence rows. Animals such as birds and mammals disperse the seeds, causing a rapid spread which often leads to a dense understory thicket that not only restricts native plant growth but also inhibits biodiversity. Once L. tatarica is introduced into an environment, it is hard to control the growth of the plant in nature because honeysuckles grow at high density. In addition to high densities, L. tatarica has the ability to suppress the growth of other native plants in the area, thus creating monocultures. Problems reported with the invasion of L. tatarica include depletion of soil moisture and nutrients, allelopathic chemicals functioning to chemically alter the growth of native plants, and reductions in the density of tree seedlings in the area.

The wood invokes a behavioural response in about half of domestic cats. Of cats that do not respond to catnip, one third respond to Tatarian honeysuckle.

In its native habitat, Tatarian honeysuckle is a host plant to at least 16 Lepidoptera species, including Limenitis camilla, Limenitis helmanni and Perittia sibirica.

== Toxicity ==
The species has a low poisonous severity level to humans, with no reports of its fatal consumption. Eating its berries is not recommended, causing symptoms including diarrhea, vomiting and abdominal pain.
