= Pseudogaurotina abdominalis =

Scientific classification
- Domain: Eukaryota
- Kingdom: Animalia
- Phylum: Arthropoda
- Class: Insecta
- Order: Coleoptera
- Suborder: Polyphaga
- Infraorder: Cucujiformia
- Family: Cerambycidae
- Subfamily: Lepturinae
- Tribe: Rhagiini
- Genus: Pseudogaurotina
- Species: P. abdominalis

Binomial name
- Pseudogaurotina abdominalis (Bland, 1862)

Synonyms
- Gaurotes abdominalis Bland, 1862; Gaurotes abdominalis var. micans Podany, 1962

Species of beetle

Pseudogaurotina abdominalis is a species of the Lepturinae subfamily in the long-horned beetle family. This beetle is distributed in United States and Canada.
