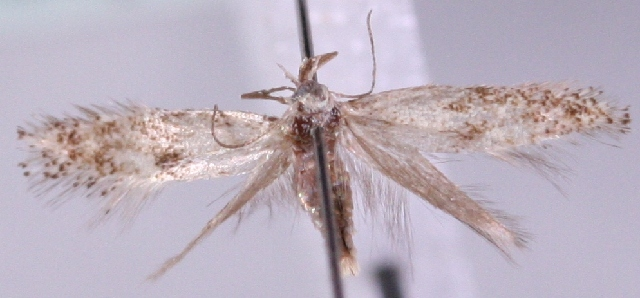

Scientific classification
- Kingdom: Animalia
- Phylum: Arthropoda
- Clade: Pancrustacea
- Class: Insecta
- Order: Lepidoptera
- Family: Elachistidae
- Genus: Perittia
- Species: P. sibirica

Binomial name
- Perittia sibirica Sinev, 1992

= Perittia sibirica =

Species of moth

Perittia sibirica is a moth of the family Elachistidae. It is found in Russia (Irkutsk and the southern Ural Mountains).

The larvae feed on Lonicera tatarica.
