= Rhodoxanthin =

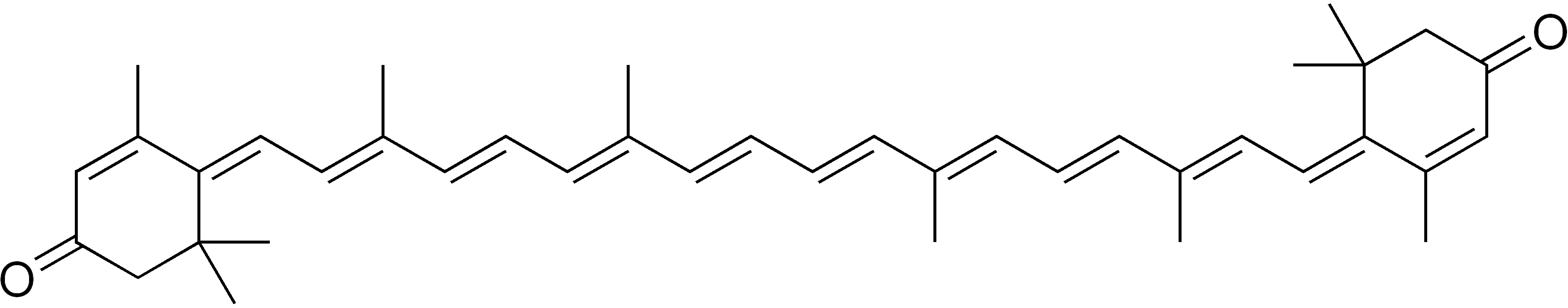

Names
- IUPAC name (4E)-3,5,5-Trimethyl-4-[(2E,4E,6E,8E,10E,12E,14E,16E,18E)-3,7,12,16-Tetramethyl-18-(2,6,6-trimethyl-4-oxo-1-cyclohex-2-enylidene)octadeca-2,4,6,8,10,12,14,16-octaenylidene]-1-cyclohex-2-enone
- Other names: 4',5'-Didehydro-retro-β-carotene-3,3'-dione; E161f

Identifiers
| CAS Number | 116-30-3 |
| 3D model (JSmol) | Interactive image |
| ChemSpider | 4444663 |
| E number | E161f (colours) |
| KEGG | C08610 |
| PubChem CID | 5281251 |
| UNII | 51V984ID9Q |
| CompTox Dashboard (EPA) | DTXSID201017050 |
- InChI: InChI=1S/C40H50O2/c1-29(17-13-19-31(3)21-23-37-33(5)25-35(41)27-39(37,7)8)15-11-12-16-30(2)18-14-20-32(4)22-24-38-34(6)26-36(42)28-40(38,9)10/h11-26H,27-28H2,1-10H3/b15-11+,16-12+,19-13+,20-14+,29-17+,30-18+,31-21+,32-22+,37-23-,38-24- Key: VWXMLZQUDPCJPL-ZDHAIZATSA-N; InChI=1/C40H50O2/c1-29(17-13-19-31(3)21-23-37-33(5)25-35(41)27-39(37,7)8)15-11-12-16-30(2)18-14-20-32(4)22-24-38-34(6)26-36(42)28-40(38,9)10/h11-26H,27-28H2,1-10H3/b15-11+,16-12+,19-13+,20-14+,29-17+,30-18+,31-21+,32-22+,37-23-,38-24- Key: VWXMLZQUDPCJPL-ZDHAIZATBA
- SMILES: CC\1=CC(=O)CC(/C1=C\C=C(\C=C\C=C(\C=C\C=C\C(=C\C=C\C(=C\C=C\2/C(CC(=O)C=C2C)(C)C)\C)\C)/C)/C)(C)C

Properties
| Chemical formula | C_{40}H_{50}O_{2} |
| Molar mass | 562.82 g/mol |
| Appearance | Purple crystals |
| Melting point | 219 °C (426 °F; 492 K) |
- Except where otherwise noted, data are given for materials in their standard state (at 25 °C [77 °F], 100 kPa). verify (what is ?) Infobox references

Rhodoxanthin is a xanthophyll pigment with a purple color that is found in small quantities in a variety of plants including Taxus baccata and Lonicera morrowii. It is also found in the feathers of some birds. As a food additive it is used under the E number E161f as a food coloring. It is not approved for use in the EU or US; however, it is approved in Australia and New Zealand (where it is listed under its INS number 161f).
