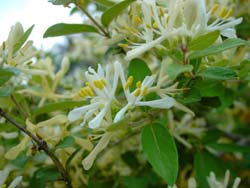

Scientific classification
- Kingdom: Plantae
- Clade: Tracheophytes
- Clade: Angiosperms
- Clade: Eudicots
- Clade: Asterids
- Order: Dipsacales
- Family: Caprifoliaceae
- Genus: Lonicera
- Species: L. morrowii

Binomial name
- Lonicera morrowii A. Gray

= Lonicera morrowii =

Morrow's honeysuckle

Species of honeysuckle

Lonicera morrowii, the Morrow's honeysuckle, is a deciduous honeysuckle in the family Caprifoliaceae, native to Japan, Korea, and Northeast China. It is colloquially called "bush honeysuckle" in the United States, and is considered an invasive species.

== Description ==
It is a shrub, reaching a height of 2–2.5 m, with oblong leaves 4–6 cm long. It leafs out quite early in the spring, and in North America is commonly the first deciduous shrub with foliage in March. The flowers are white to pale yellow, and the fruit is a dark red berry 7–8 mm diameter containing several seeds. The berries, while eaten frequently by birds, are considered poisonous to humans.

== Taxonomy ==
In cultivation, Lonicera morrowii has hybridized with other shrubby species of Lonicera. Crossed with L. tatarica, it forms the invasive hybrid L. × bella. It can also hybridize with L. ruprechtiana.

== As an invasive species ==
Morrow's honeysuckle is confirmed as a highly invasive species in the northeastern United States. Morrow's honeysuckle thrives at the edges of forests, roads, or other natural or man-made barriers, but is not limited to them, and is found in both mature and disturbed forests. In some areas, Morrow's honeysuckle is the dominant plant species, especially in areas of disturbed ecological succession. It is suspected that Lonicera morrowii is allelopathic, and may capitalize on disturbed ecological succession by establishing itself and then preventing the growth of plants underneath it. With a sufficiently established thicket of honeysuckle, even other shade-tolerant, invasive species, such as Fortune's spindle have difficulty growing underneath it, whether due to its suspected allelopathic activity or through soil depletion.

=== Effects on flora and fauna ===
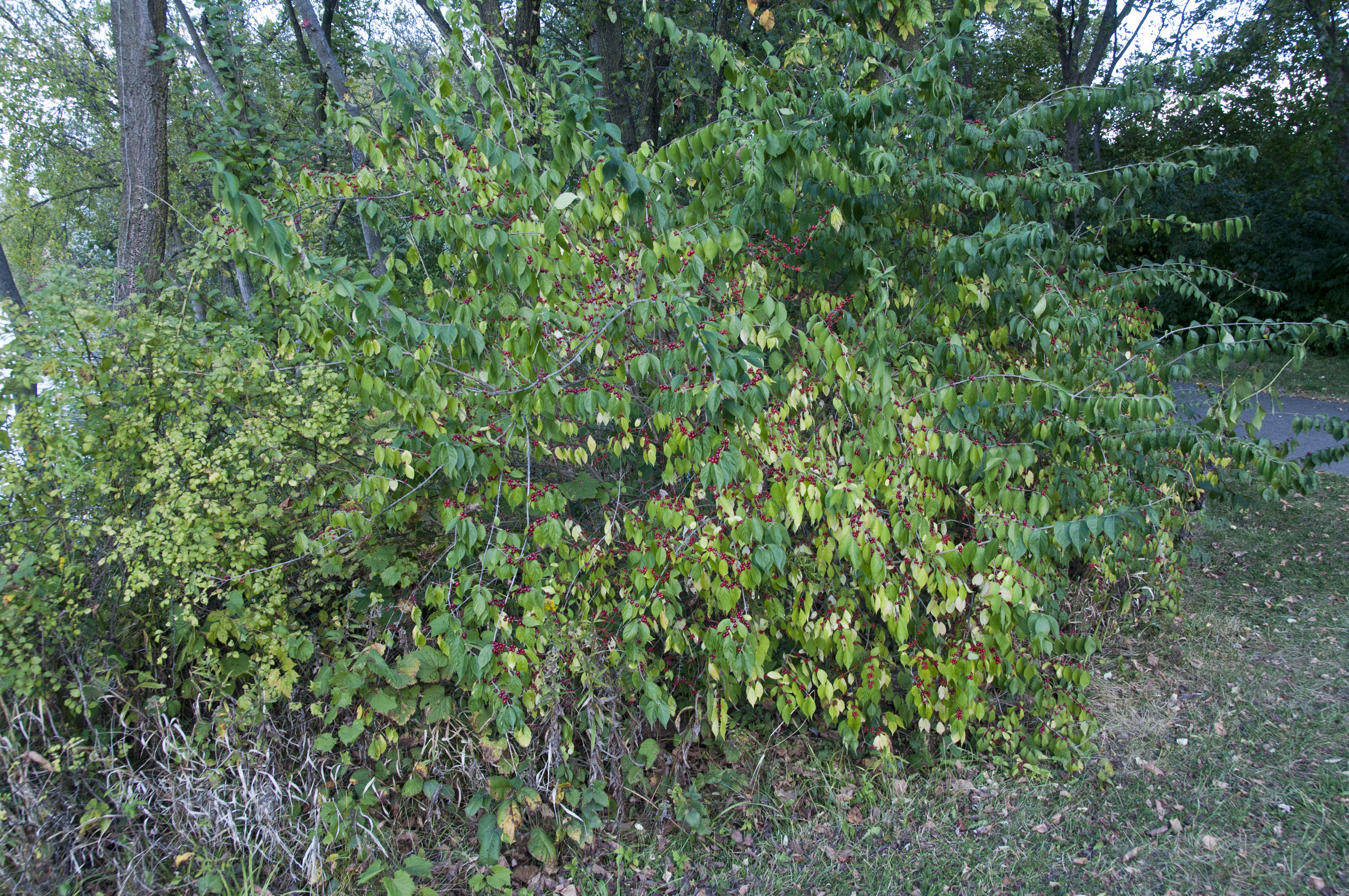
A Morrow's honeysuckle in Ohio

Due to its early leafing, Morrow's honeysuckle is particularly harmful to spring ephemerals, flowers that evolved to bloom briefly in the spring before other plants leafed out.

Many cedar waxwings' wax spots in the eastern United States have taken on an unusual orange hue in the last 35 years, a phenomenon that has been attributed to Lonicera morrowii. The chemical involved in this color change is rhodoxanthin, a red dye found in the berries of Morrow's honeysuckle.
