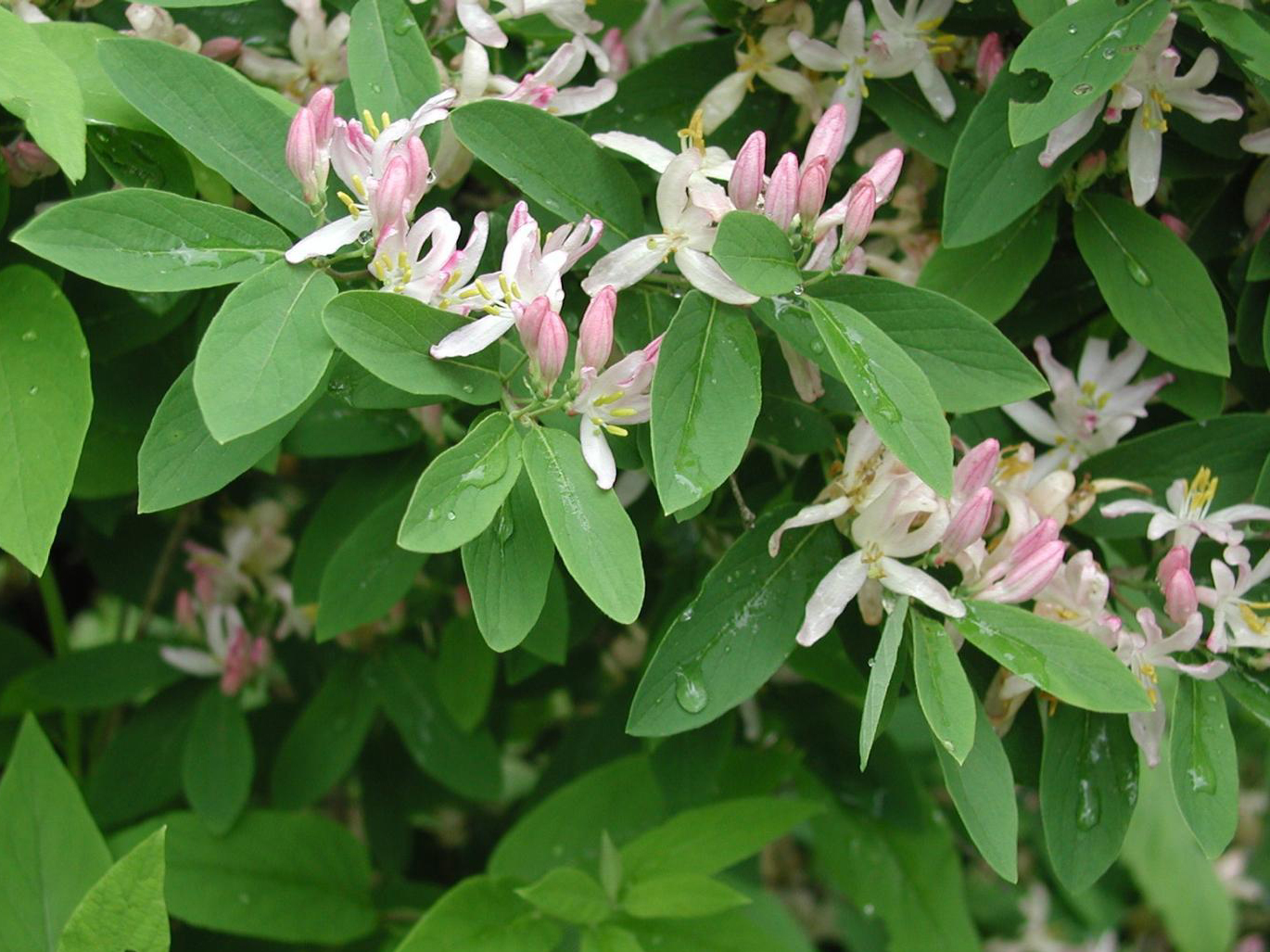

Scientific classification
- Kingdom: Plantae
- Clade: Tracheophytes
- Clade: Angiosperms
- Clade: Eudicots
- Clade: Asterids
- Order: Dipsacales
- Family: Caprifoliaceae
- Genus: Lonicera
- Species: L. × bella

Binomial name
- Lonicera × bella Zabel

= Lonicera × bella =

Species of honeysuckle

Lonicera × bella, known as Bell's honeysuckle and showy fly honeysuckle, is a hybrid species of flowering plant in the family Caprifoliaceae. It was first described by Hermann Zabel in 1889. Zabel reported that he grew it in cultivation from seeds obtained from a plant of Lonicera morrowii, but that its appearance suggested the influence of L. tatarica. It has escaped from cultivation and become an aggressive invasive species in central and eastern parts of the United States.

== Description ==
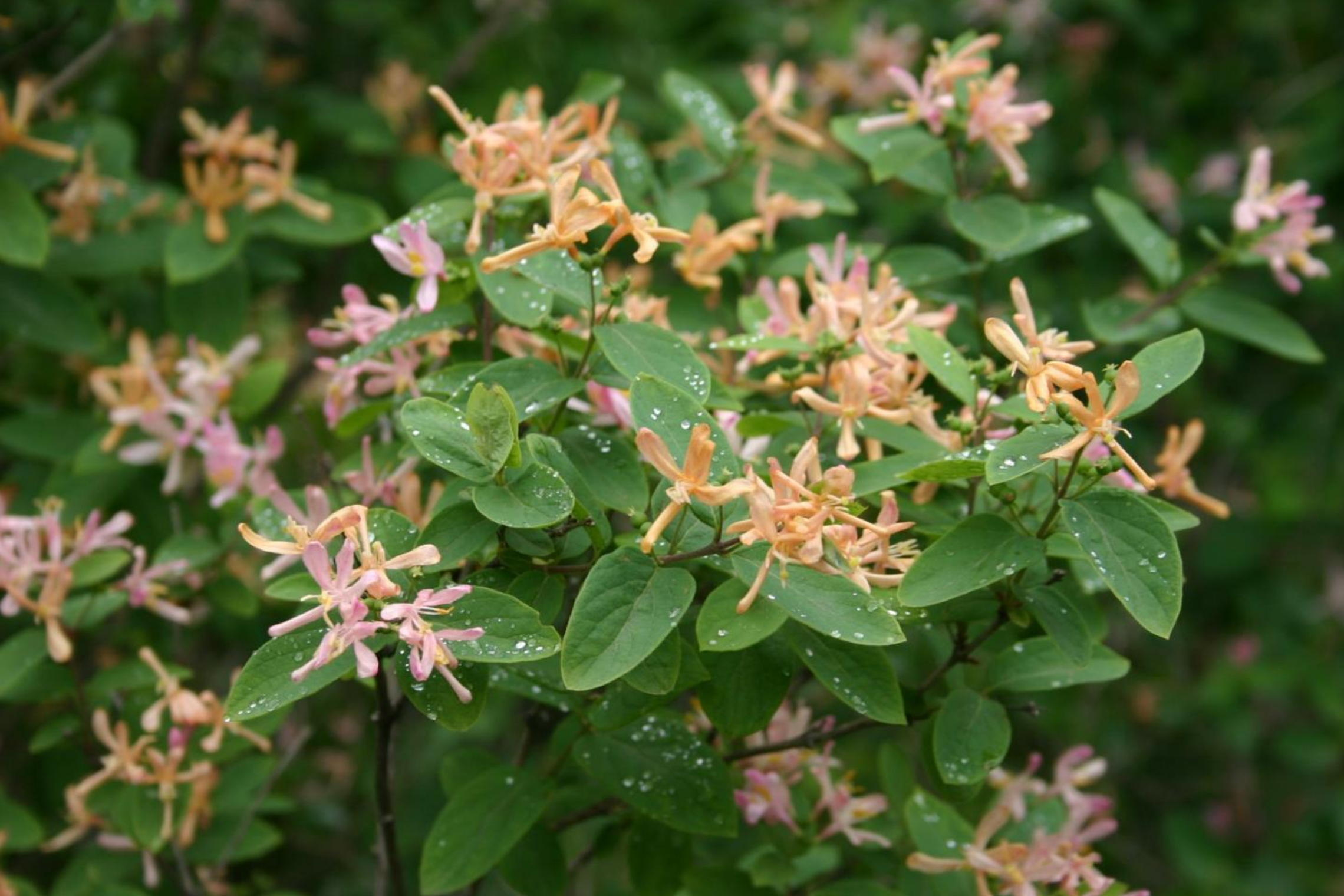
Flowers often yellow as they age.

Lonicera × bella is an artificial hybrid between L. morrowii and L. tatarica. In appearance it is intermediate between the two parents. It is a shrub, potentially reaching 6 m (20 ft) in height. The young stems are hollow and weakly pubescent. The oppositely arranged leaves are oval, untoothed and between 2.5–7.5 cm (1–3 in) in length, slightly pubescent underneath. Paired flowers appear in the leaf axils in late Spring or early Summer (May to June in North America). They are usually some shade of pink, but vary in colour, often tending to turn yellow as they age. The fruits are red berries.

=== Identification ===
The hybrid can back-cross with the parent species, producing continuous variation between the two, creating a "hybrid swarm" and making identification difficult. The parents and the hybrid can hybridize with several other species of "bush honeysuckle", complicating identification still further. In 1966, Green provided a key to the bush honeysuckles found in the Arnold Arboretum. He suggested that critical features of L. x bella were:

- plant more-or-less hairy, especially on the leaves, pedicels, and bracts
- leaves broadest at or below the middle, usually with an obtuse (blunt) rather than acuminate (sharply pointed) tip
- bracts usually as long as or longer than the ovary
- flower 14–18 mm (9/16–11/16 in) long from the base of the tube to the tip of the upper lobes.

As an indication of the difficulty of identification, it was reported in 1974 that 39 of the 44 identified specimens of L. × bella in the University of Wisconsin Arboretum were originally labelled as one or the other of the parents. Barnes and Cottam wrote that "references to the literature should be interpreted with the constraint in mind that there may be considerable confusion in the identification of the taxa involved."

== Taxonomy ==
Lonicera × bella was first described by Hermann Zabel in 1889. Zabel reported that he grew it from seeds obtained from a plant of Lonicera morrowii, but that its appearance suggested the influence of L. tatarica. Zabel described some variations under Latin names:

- candida: white flowers, buds with a greenish touch
- albida: flowers white, buds with a reddish touch
- incarnata: pink flowers, usually with lighter margins
- atrorosea: dark pink flowers, usually with lighter margins

The triple hybrid between Lonicera × bella and L. ruprechtiana is called L. × muendeniensis.

== Invasiveness ==
The parents are from discontinuous areas of Asia: L. morrowii is native to South Korea and Japan, L. tatarica occurs from eastern Europe to Central Siberia and north-west China. These areas have very different climates: L. morrowii occurring in moister, maritime environments, L. tatarica in drier, colder ones. The hybrid has escaped from cultivation and is naturalized in central and eastern North America, where it grows in a variety of ecological conditions, wider than either parent, but often favouring disturbed habitats.

Lonicera × bella exhibits a considerable degree of heterosis (hybrid vigour) and has become an aggressive invasive species in parts of the United States. It is reported to be invasive in US National Parks in Indiana, Maine and Virginia.

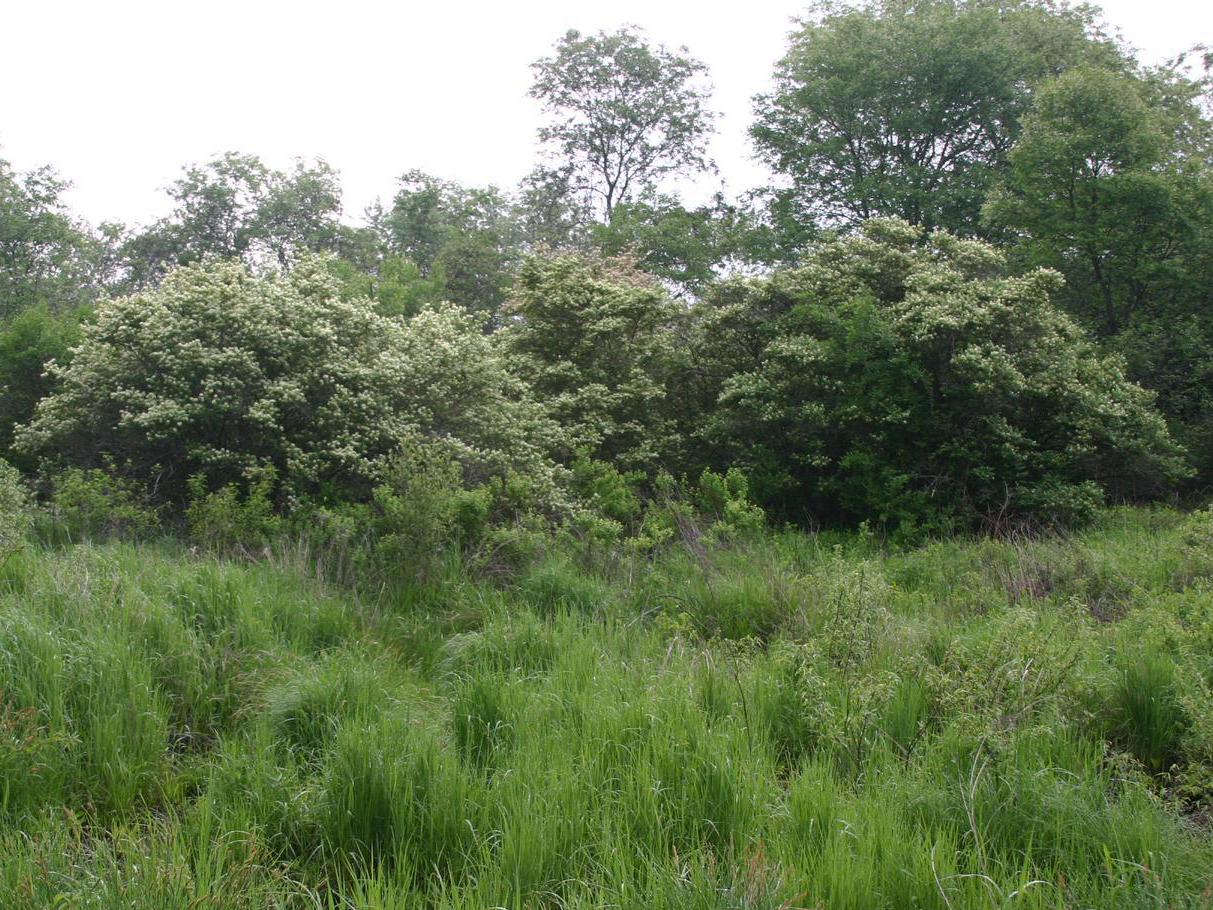
Naturalized in the US

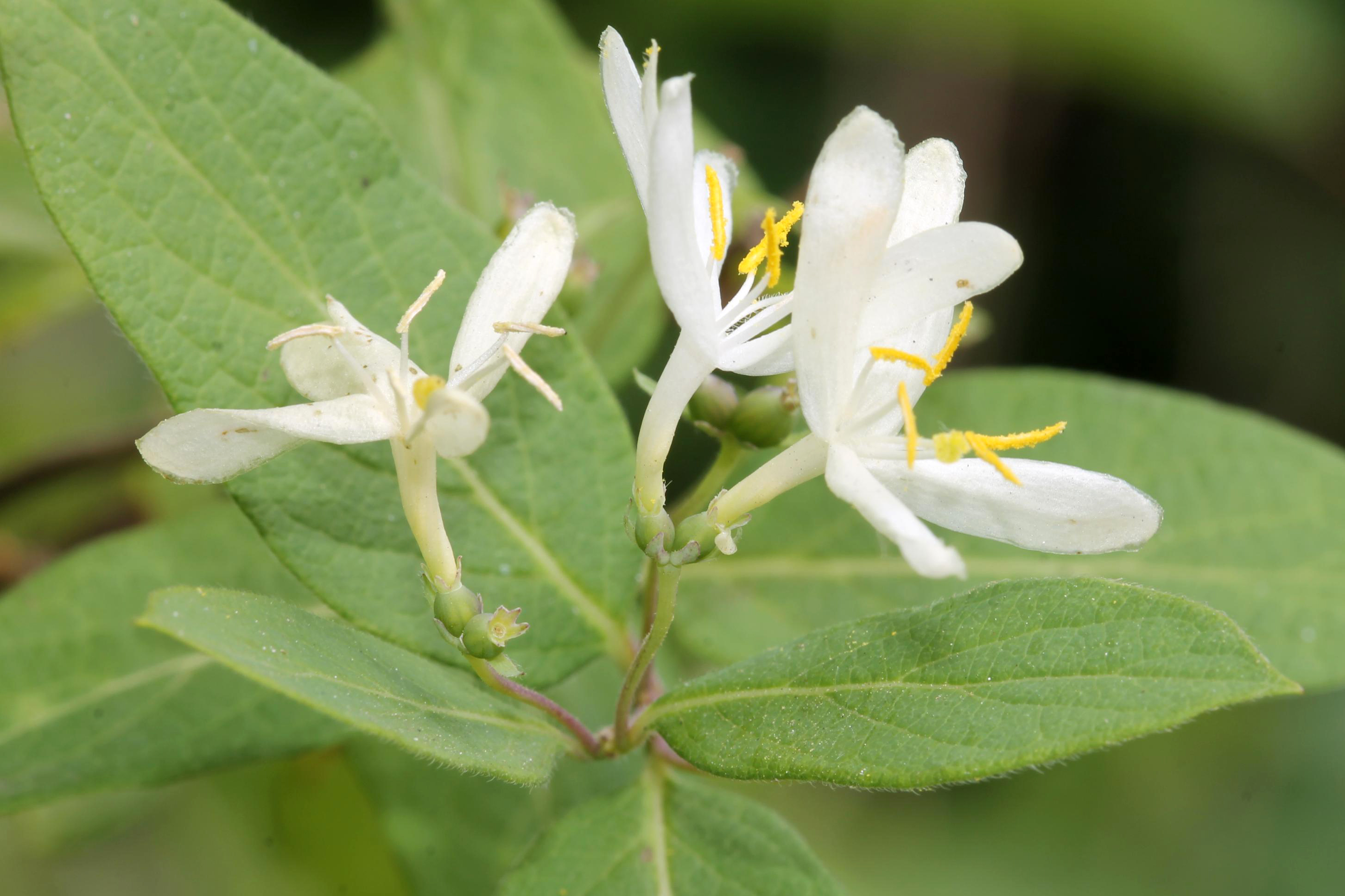
White flowers

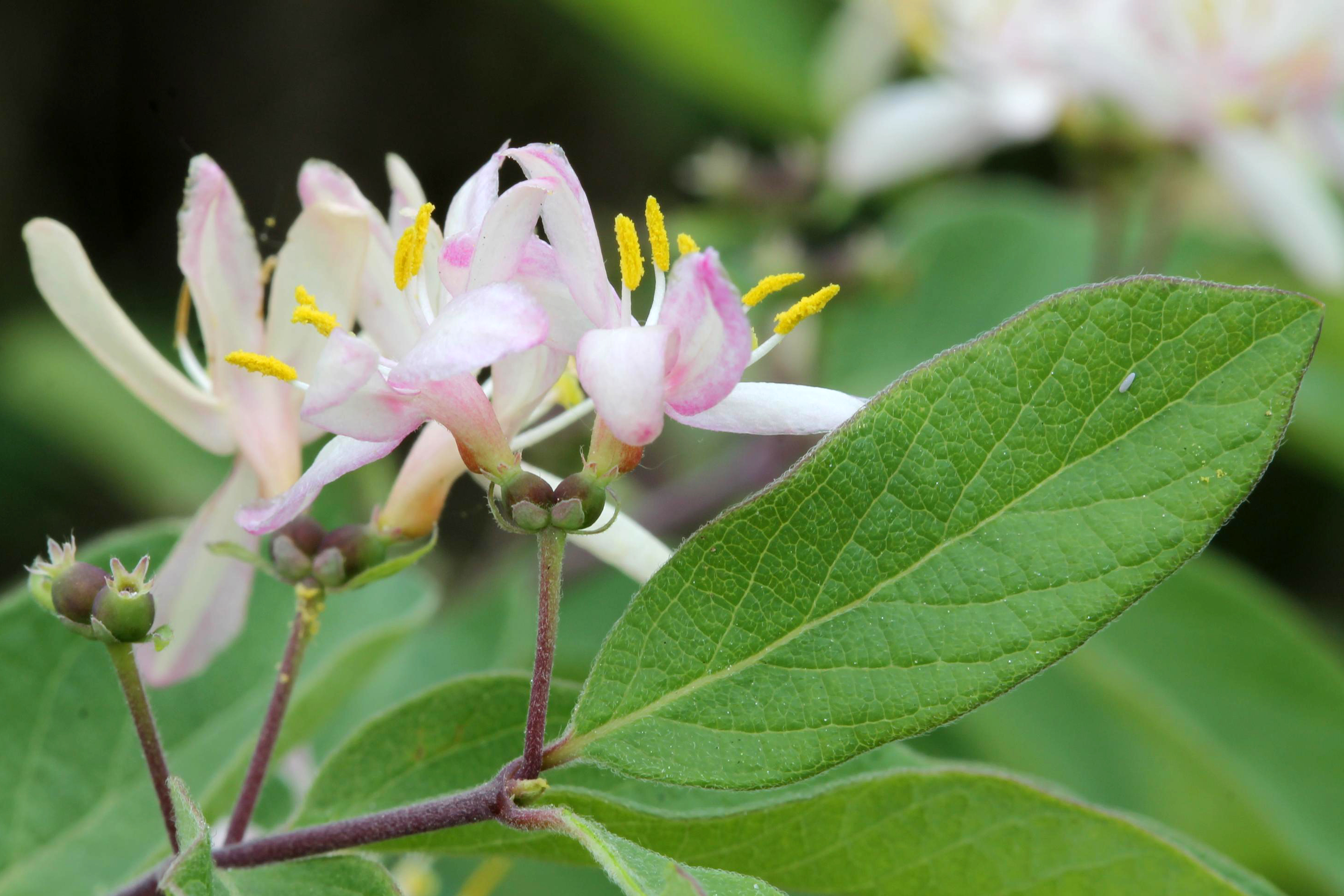
Paler pink flowers
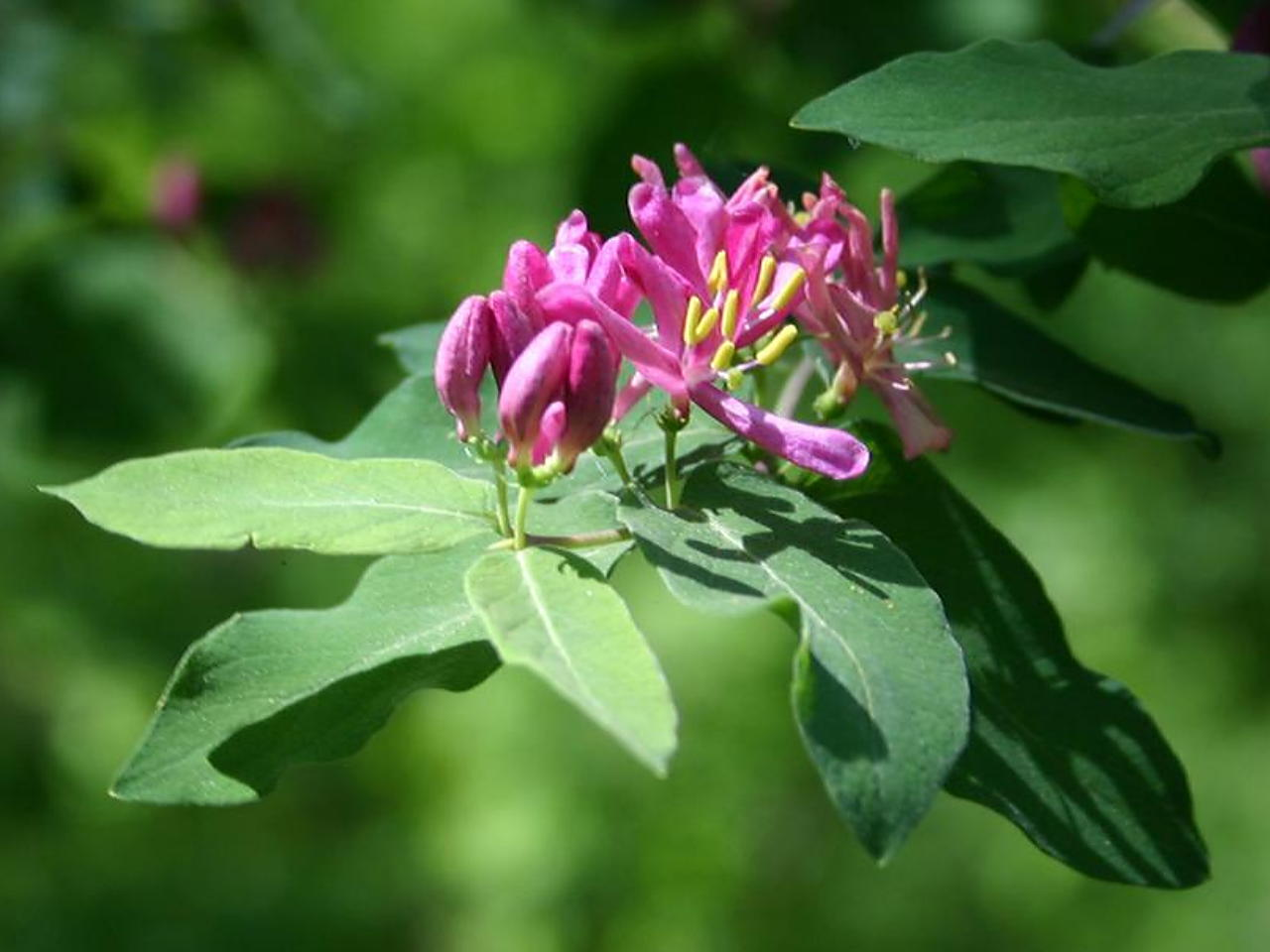
Darker pink flowers

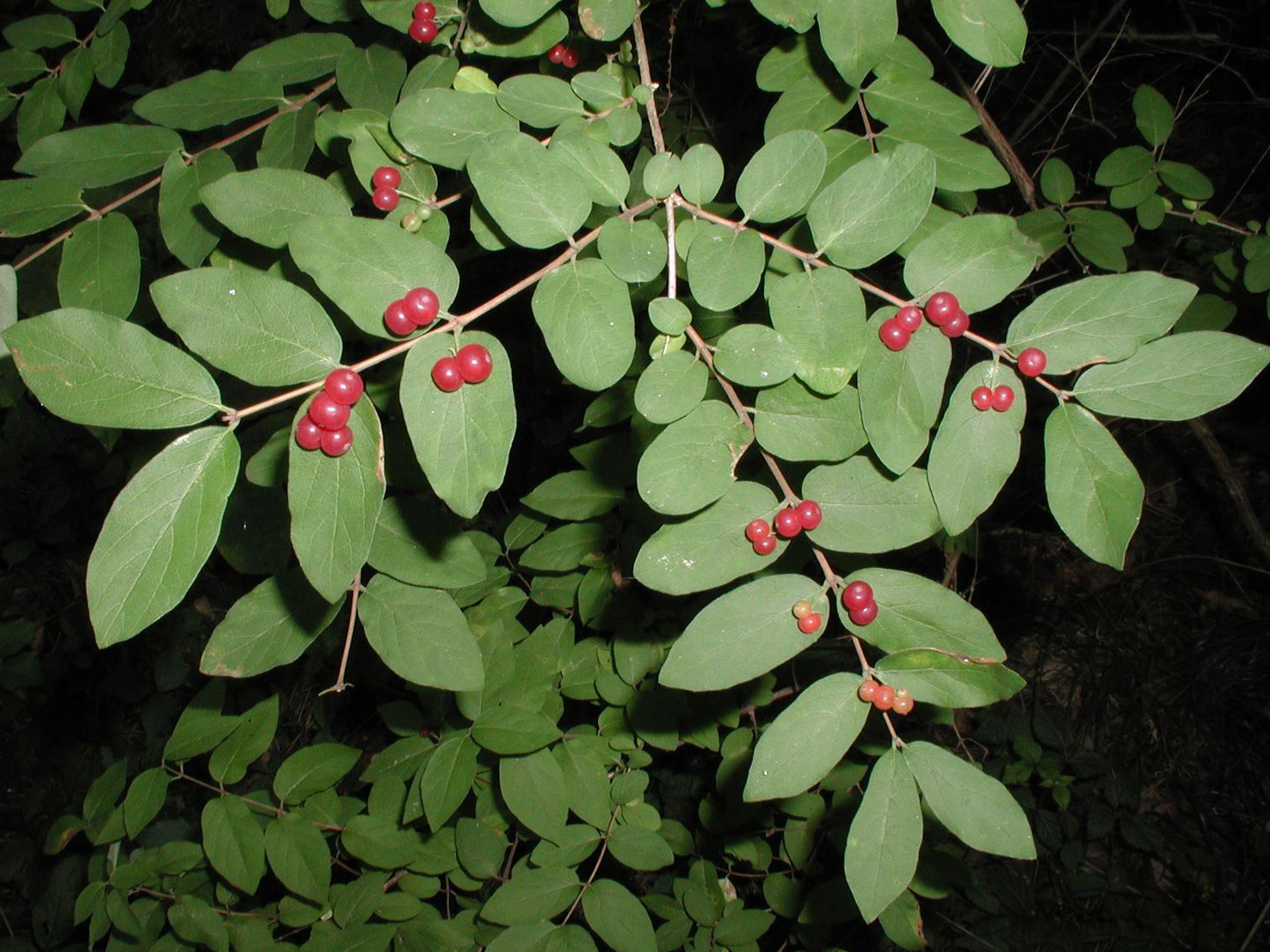
Berries

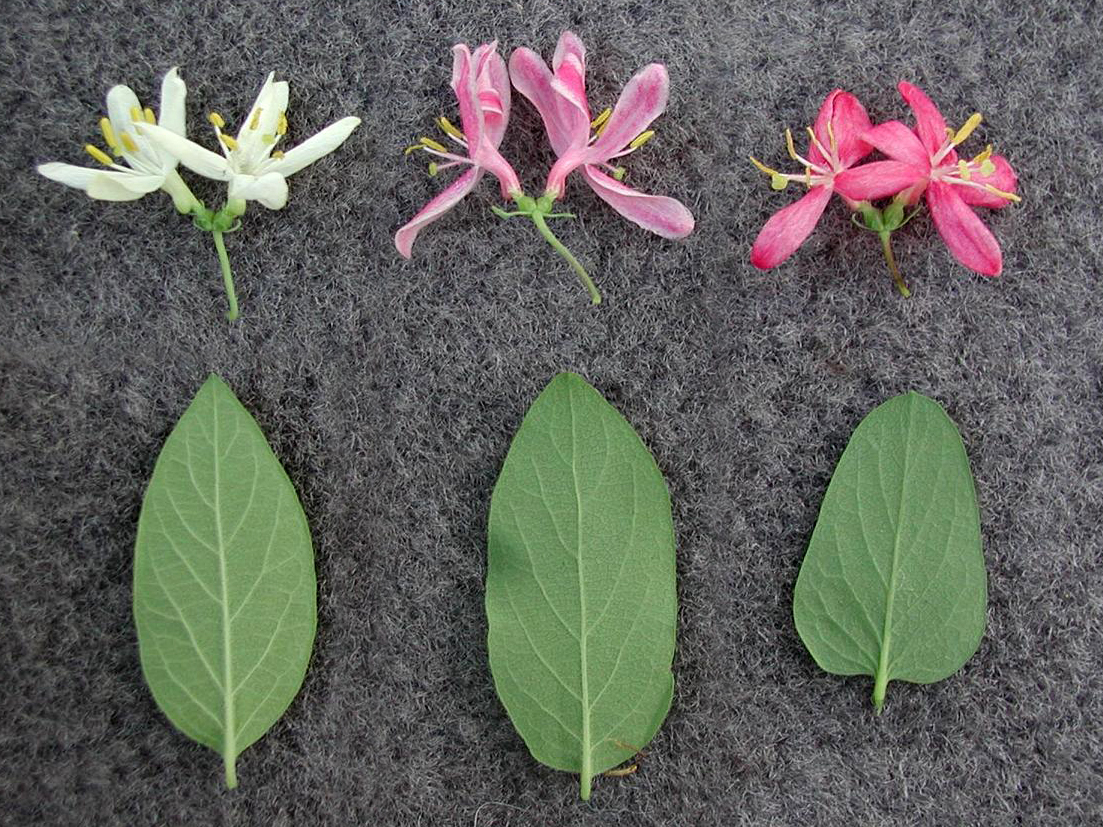
Comparison between (left to right) L. morrowii, one form of L. × bella, and L. tatarica
