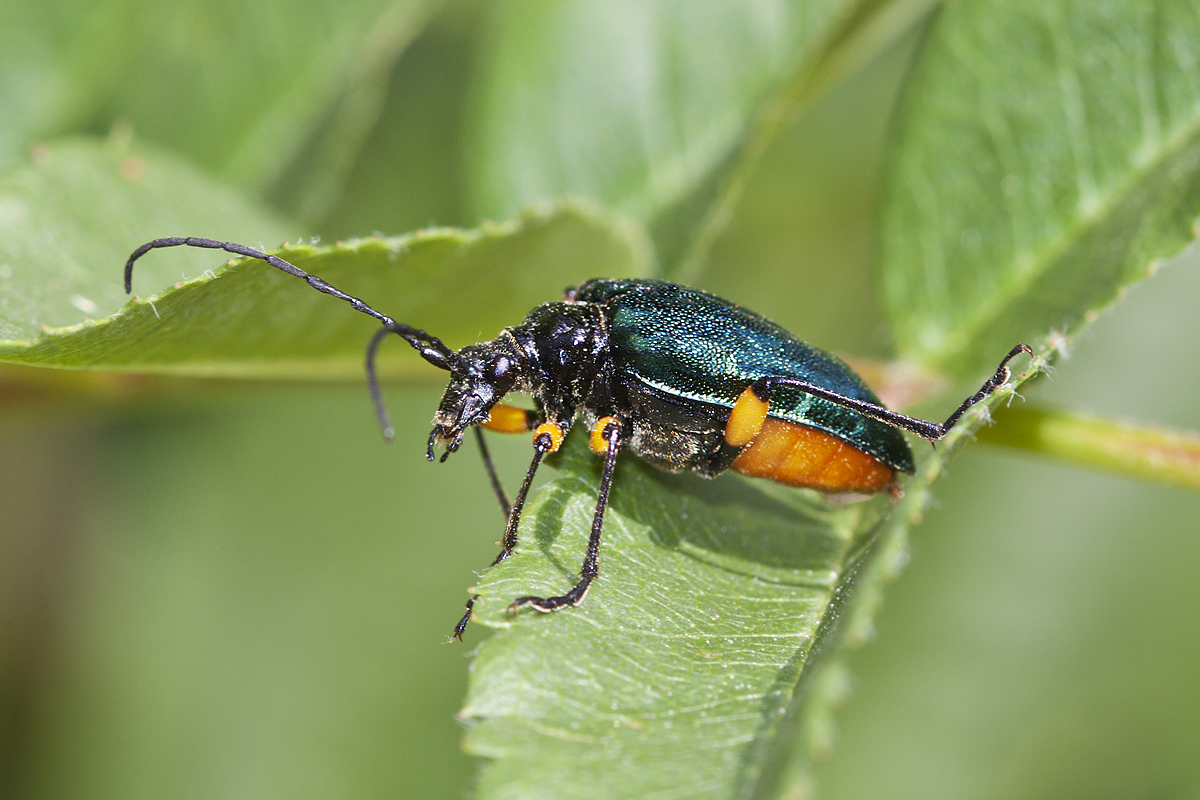
- Flower Longhorn Beetle

Scientific classification
- Domain: Eukaryota
- Kingdom: Animalia
- Phylum: Arthropoda
- Class: Insecta
- Order: Coleoptera
- Suborder: Polyphaga
- Infraorder: Cucujiformia
- Family: Cerambycidae
- Subfamily: Lepturinae
- Tribe: Rhagiini
- Genus: Pseudogaurotina; Plavilshtshikov, 1958

= Pseudogaurotina =

Genus of beetles

Pseudogaurotina is a genus of beetles in the family Cerambycidae, containing the following species:

- Pseudogaurotina abdominalis (Bland, 1862)
- Pseudogaurotina cressoni (Bland, 1864)
- Pseudogaurotina excellens (Brancsik, 1874)
- Pseudogaurotina magnifica Plavilstshikov, 1958
- Pseudogaurotina robertae Pesarini & Sabbadini, 1997
- Pseudogaurotina splendens (Jakovlev, 1893)
