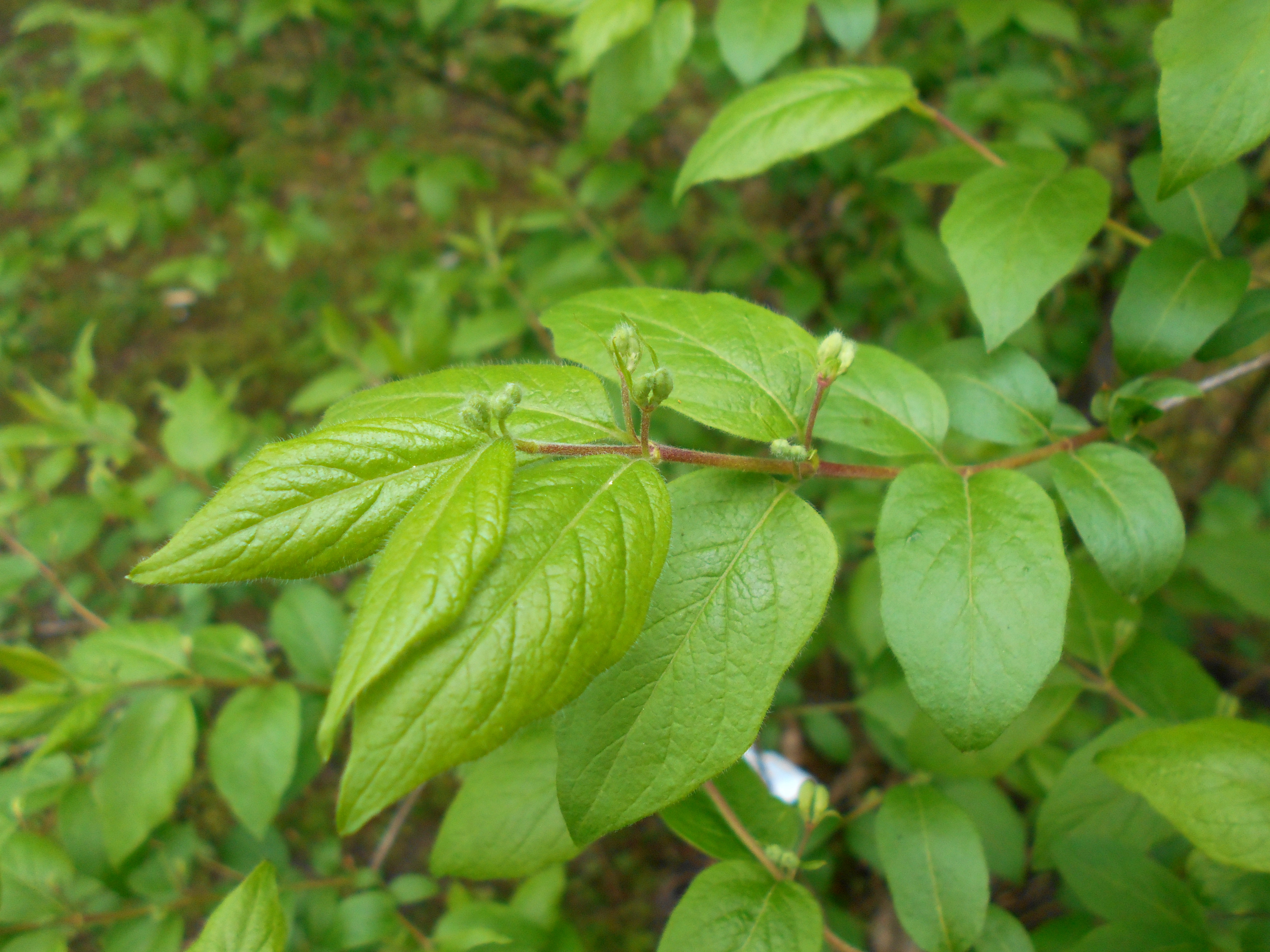

Scientific classification
- Kingdom: Plantae
- Clade: Tracheophytes
- Clade: Angiosperms
- Clade: Eudicots
- Clade: Asterids
- Order: Dipsacales
- Family: Caprifoliaceae
- Genus: Lonicera
- Species: L. ruprechtiana

Binomial name
- Lonicera ruprechtiana Regel

= Lonicera ruprechtiana =

Species of honeysuckle

Lonicera ruprechtiana, the Manchurian honeysuckle, is a deciduous honeysuckle in the family Caprifoliaceae, native to Northeast Asia.

It was first described by Eduard August von Regel.
