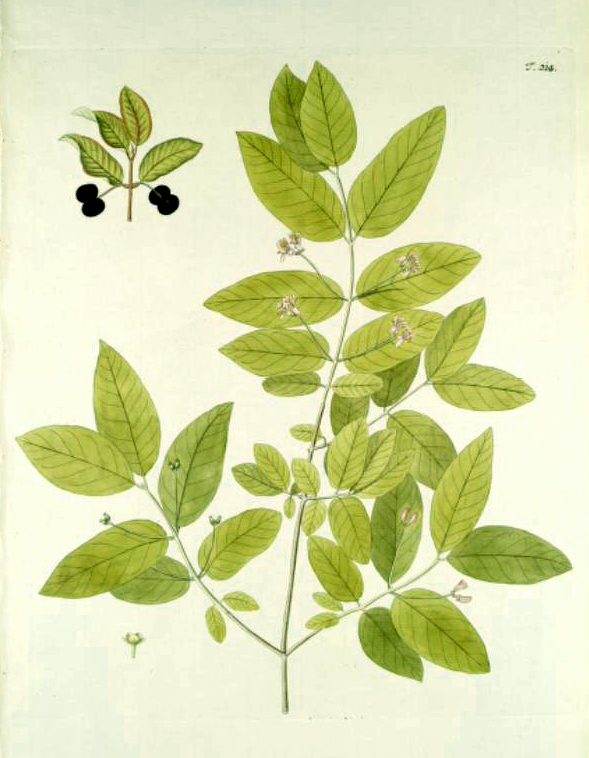
- Lonicera nigra leaves, flowers, and fruits.

Conservation status
- Least Concern (IUCN 3.1)

Scientific classification
- Kingdom: Plantae
- Clade: Tracheophytes
- Clade: Angiosperms
- Clade: Eudicots
- Clade: Asterids
- Order: Dipsacales
- Family: Caprifoliaceae
- Genus: Lonicera
- Species: L. nigra

Binomial name
- Lonicera nigra L.

= Lonicera nigra =

Black-berried honeysuckle

Species of plants

Lonicera nigra, known in English as black-berried honeysuckle is a bush honeysuckle native to the mountains of central and southern Europe.
