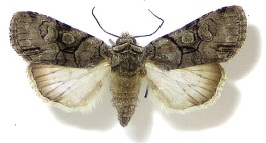
- Female
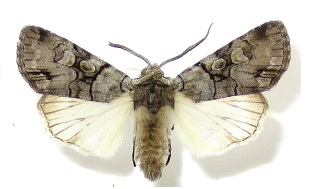
- Male

Scientific classification
- Domain: Eukaryota
- Kingdom: Animalia
- Phylum: Arthropoda
- Class: Insecta
- Order: Lepidoptera
- Superfamily: Noctuoidea
- Family: Noctuidae
- Genus: Sympistis
- Species: S. forbesi

Binomial name
- Sympistis forbesi Zacharczenko & Wagner, 2014

= Sympistis forbesi =

Species of moth

Sympistis forbesi is a moth of the family Noctuidae first described by Brigette Zacharczenko and David L. Wagner in 2014. It has been recorded from the US states of Iowa, Illinois and Minnesota and is believed to be extirpated from the eastern portion of the range in New York and New Jersey.

The length of the forewings is 14.5–16 mm for males and 14–16.5 mm for females. Adults are on wing in late summer in one generation per year.

The larvae feed on Triosteum species, including Triosteum perfoliatum and possibly Triosteum aurantiacum. They are green with a reddish dorsum.

== Etymology ==
The species is named in honour of William Trowbridge Merrifield Forbes.

== Gallery ==
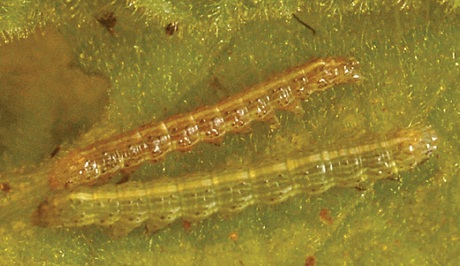
Second (upper) and third (lower) instars

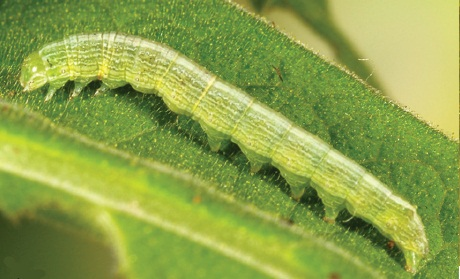
Middle instar larva

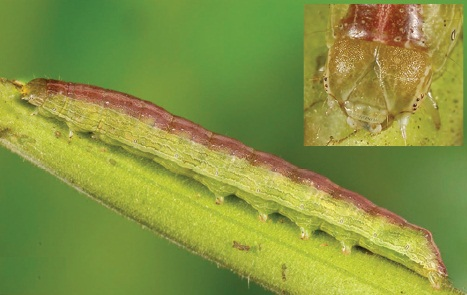
Last instar larva

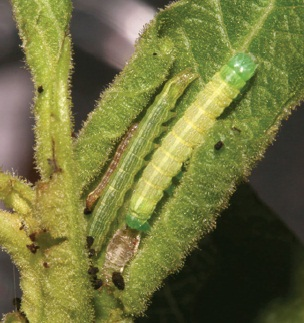
Three larvae secreted in a leaf axil

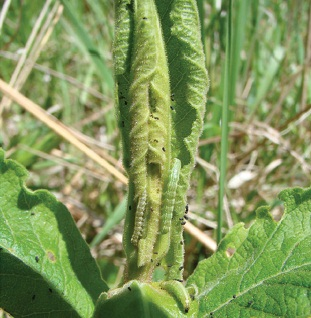
Larvae on new spring leaves

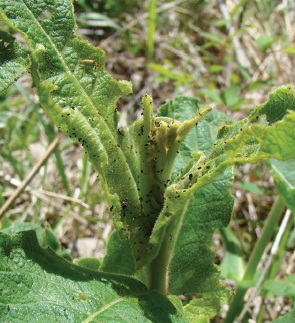
Last instar larva on a flower of Triosteum perfoliatum
