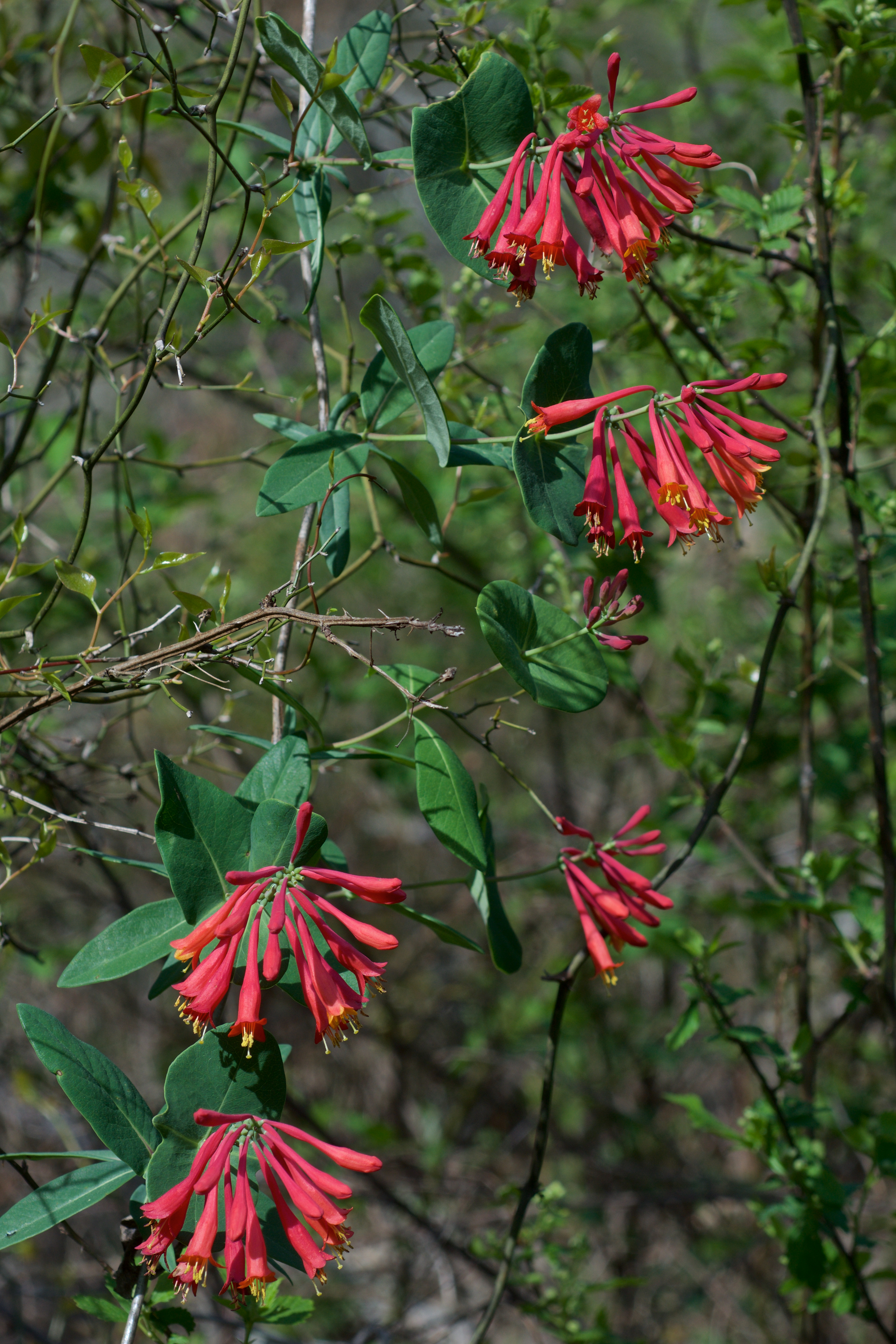

Conservation status
- Secure (NatureServe)

Scientific classification
- Kingdom: Plantae
- Clade: Tracheophytes
- Clade: Angiosperms
- Clade: Eudicots
- Clade: Asterids
- Order: Dipsacales
- Family: Caprifoliaceae
- Genus: Lonicera
- Species: L. sempervirens

Binomial name
- Lonicera sempervirens L.

= Lonicera sempervirens =

Species of honeysuckle

Lonicera sempervirens (commonly known as coral honeysuckle, trumpet honeysuckle, or scarlet honeysuckle) is a flowering plant species of honeysuckle vine native to the eastern United States which is known for its reddish flowers.

== Description ==
Lonicera sempervirens is best recognized by trumpet-shaped and coral to reddish flowers. The leaves and stems are waxy, a common trait in the honeysuckle genus. It is a twining vine growing to 20 ft or more through shrubs and young trees. The leaves are produced in opposite pairs, oval, up to 5 cm long and 4 cm broad; the leaves immediately below the flowers are perfoliate, joined at the base in a complete ring round the shoot. When born, their flowers are whorled on the end. They are present with red berries on them that are less than 1 cm width and length. The berries are inedible and grow from summer to fall. Their leaves are somewhat evergreen. The species is also flammable, which leads to it not being recommended for being planted close to residences. The flowers are produced on new growth in clusters of several groups of three together, tubular, 5 cm long, with five small lobes opening at the tip to expose the stamens and stigma. The bark is green and fuzzy when younger but becomes a light brown as it ages. The older stems get more of a red-orange color.

== Distribution ==
Lonicera sempervirens is most common in eastern North America, but has occurred as far west as Texas. It is found prominently in the southeastern United States. It is listed as endangered in Maine, the only state in which it has any legal status. Although introduced in parts of New England, populations of L. sempervirens have been found that seem to be growing natively in Connecticut, Massachusetts, and Rhode Island. It is considered extremely rare in Rhode Island. Lonicera sempervirens is most common in coastal habitats.

== Taxonomy ==
Lonicera sempervirens was first described by Swedish botanist Carl Linnaeus in his treatise Species Plantarum in 1753. Varieties of L. sempervirens are Lonicera sempervirens L. var. hirsutula Rehder, Lonicera sempervirens L. var. minor Aiton, and Lonicera sempervirens L. var. sempervirens. Phenianthus sempervirens (L.) Raf is a synonym. Hybrids of the species include Lonicera × tellmanniana and Lonicera × heckrottii.

== Uses ==
Lonicera sempervirens is often used as an alternative to the invasive Lonicera japonica across the east coast of North America. It is popular to grow in gardens or recreational areas as it is considered low maintenance. It is also used to attract hummingbirds and butterflies for pollinator gardens. The species is mainly used ornamentally on fences or lattices, and for the attractive red color of its flowers. It can be propagated by either stem cutting or by seed, and has been used to treat asthma and bee stings in Native American traditions. There are a few different cultivars including: 'Magnifica' which blooms later and is more floriferous, 'Sulphurea' with sulfur-yellow flowers, and 'Superba' - another floriferous selection with bright red flowers.

Lonicera sempervirens can grow in many areas due to its cold hardiness, being winter hardy in USDA zones 5-9. It prefers sunny and moist areas but is also drought resistant. Coral honeysuckle can live in clay or loam soils that have good drainage, and it prefers acidic soil with a pH of 6. It can grow in full sun or in fully shaded areas. Deer prefer not to browse on it; it is also juglone-resistant, able to tolerate growing near walnuts.

== Wildlife uses ==
Lonicera sempervirens is used by many animals for food, most commonly used for nectar by butterflies and hummingbirds. It attracts bees, hummingbirds, moths, and even songbirds. Birds such as quail, purple finch, and American robin eat the red berries. Ruby-throated hummingbirds and insects pollinate the bright red to pinkish-red flowers from mid-spring to fall. It hosts the caterpillars of spring azures and snowberry clearwing moths. Lonicera sempervirens is used moderately for animal cover and has a relatively low nutritional value.

== Gallery ==
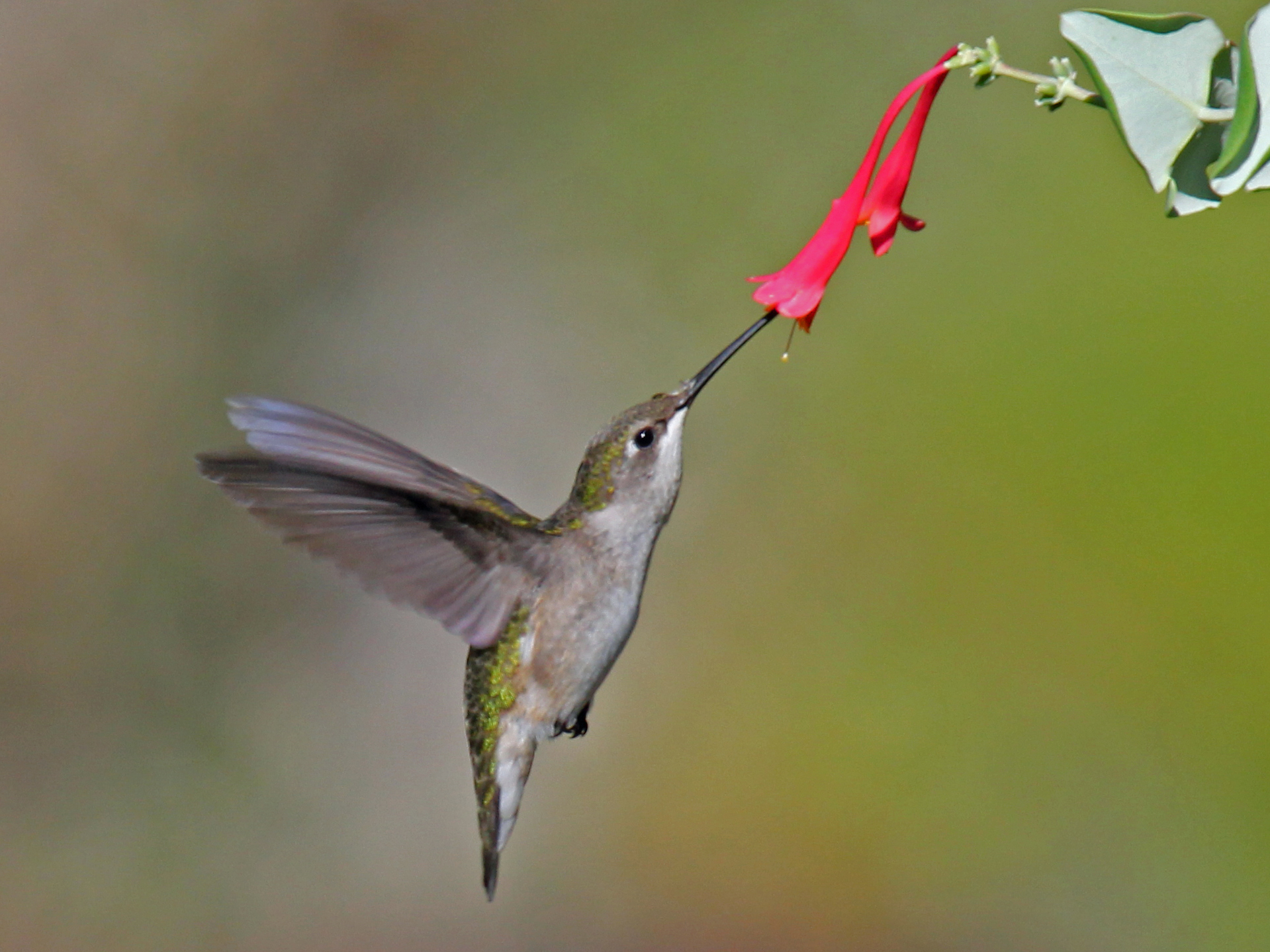
Ruby-throated hummingbird feeding

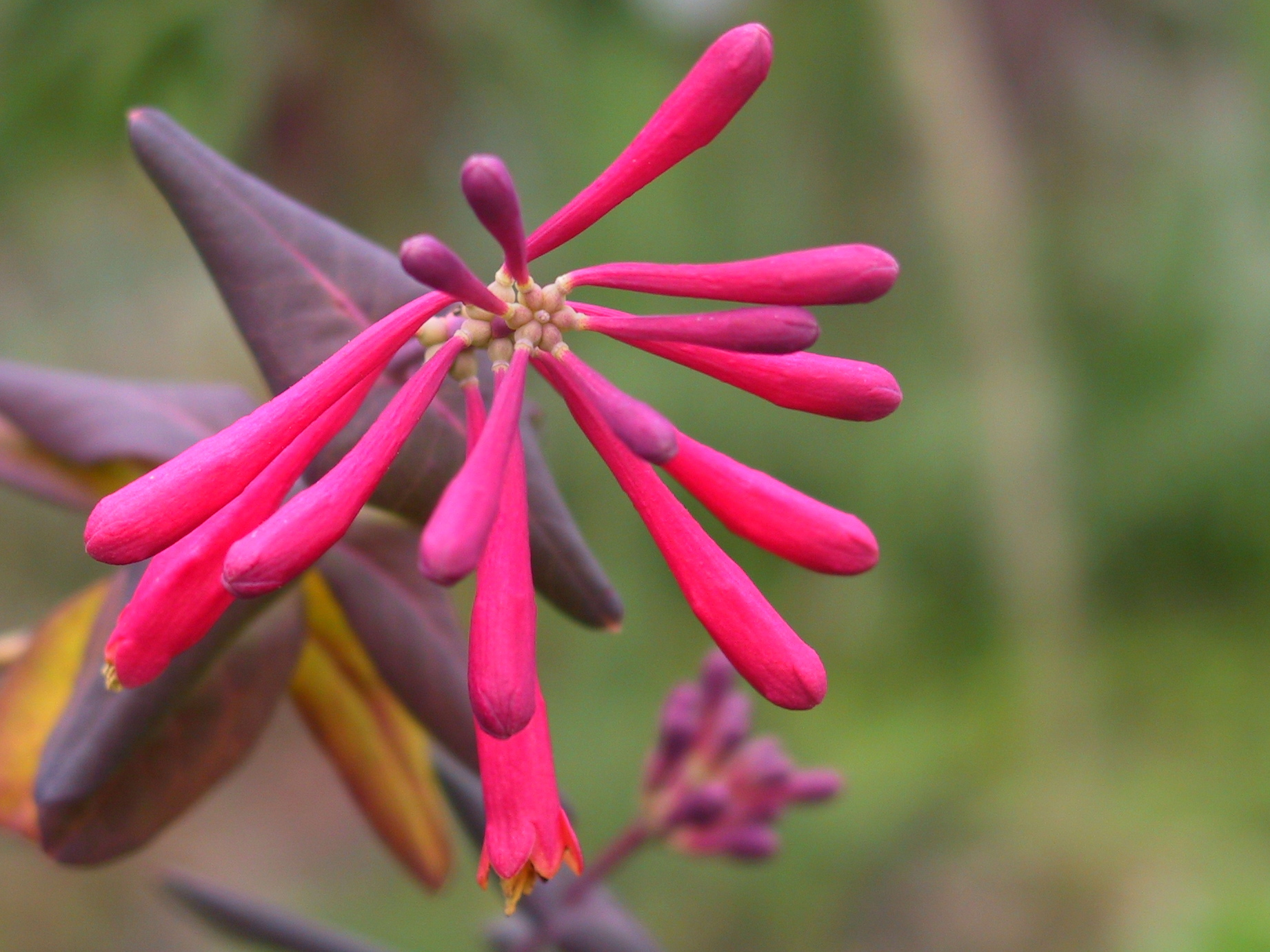
Flower buds

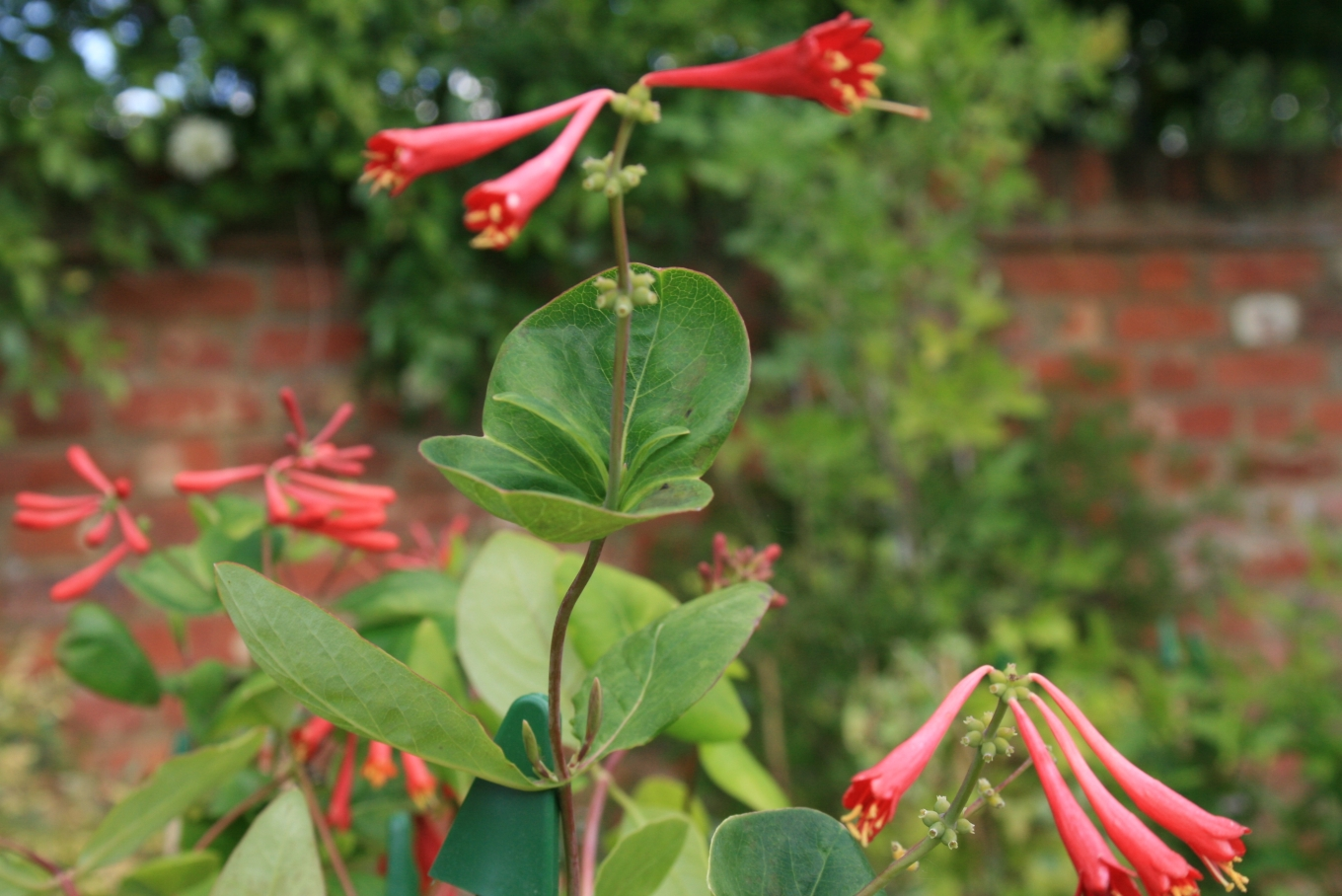
Leaves and appearance after blooms detach

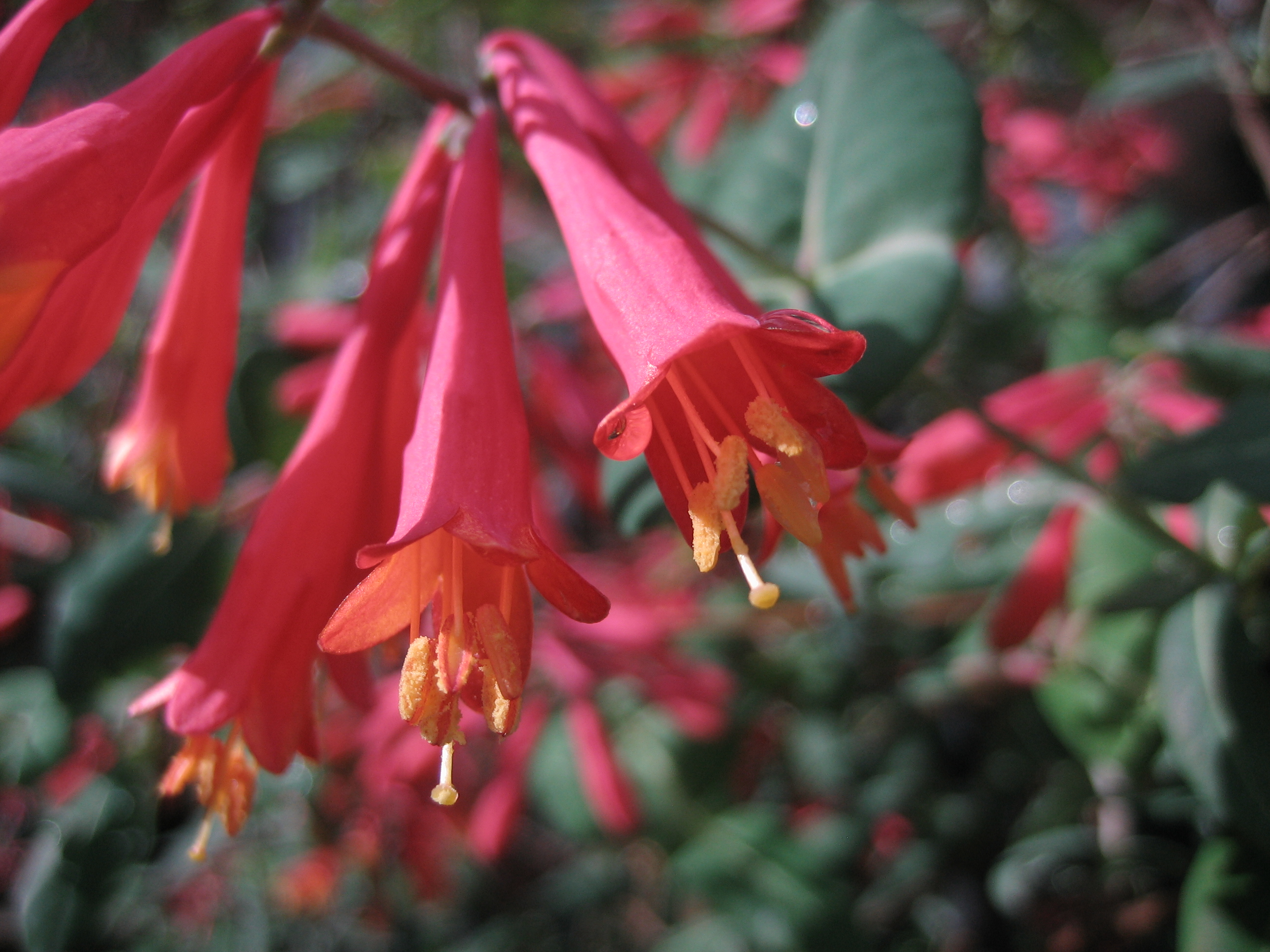
Close-up of blooms

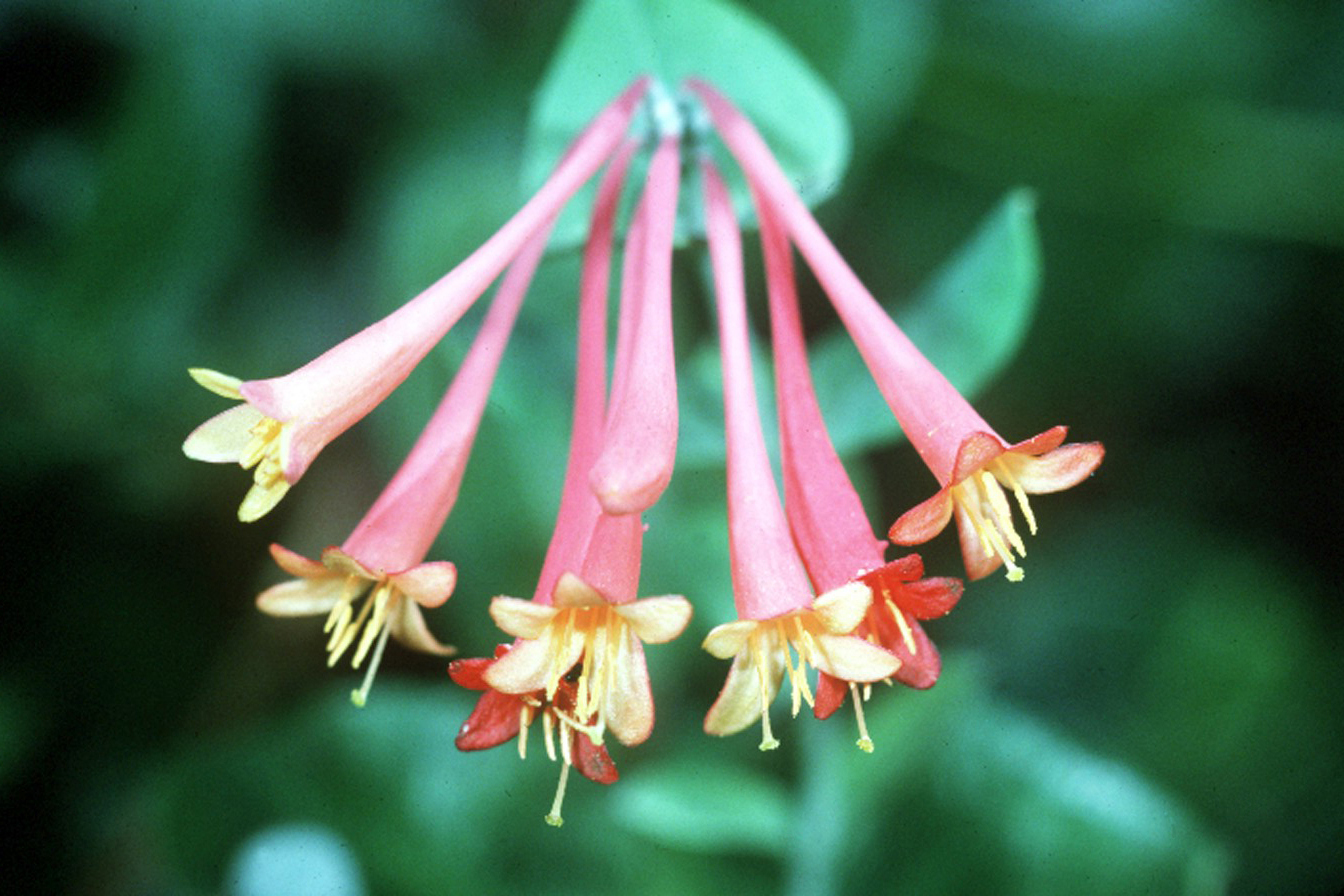
Pinkish-red flowers with yellow insides
