= Feverwort =

Feverwort is a common name for several plants and may refer to:

- Centaurium
- Eupatorium perfoliatum
- Triosteum
