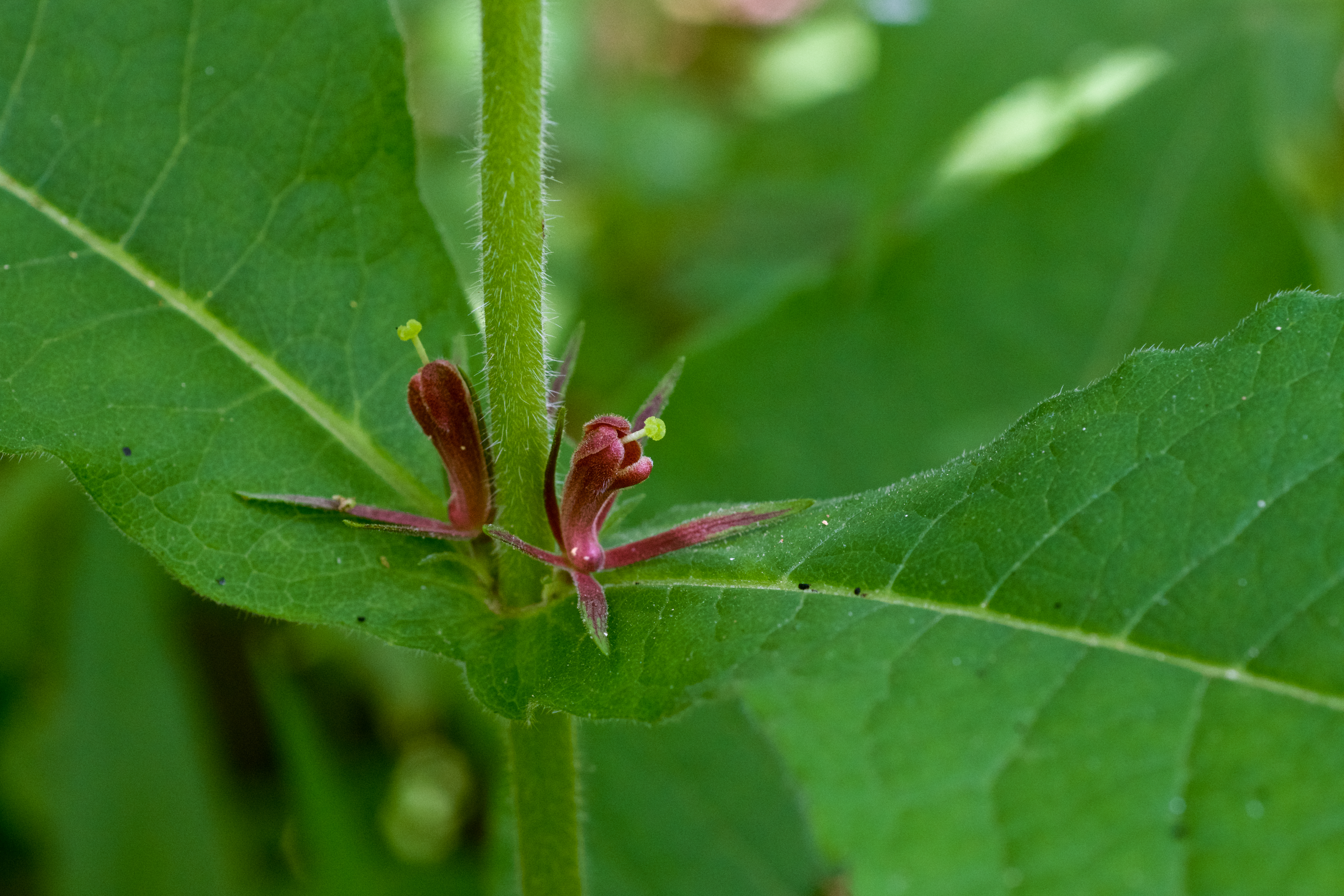

Conservation status
- Secure (NatureServe)

Scientific classification
- Kingdom: Plantae
- Clade: Tracheophytes
- Clade: Angiosperms
- Clade: Eudicots
- Clade: Asterids
- Order: Dipsacales
- Family: Caprifoliaceae
- Genus: Triosteum
- Species: T. perfoliatum

Binomial name
- Triosteum perfoliatum L.

= Triosteum perfoliatum =

Species of plant

Triosteum perfoliatum, commonly known as perfoliate tinker's-weed, late horse gentian, common horse gentian, perfoliate-leaved horse-gentian, feverwort, and wild coffee, is a species of flowering plant belonging to the family Caprifoliaceae (honeysuckle). It is found in eastern and central North America. The yellow-orange berries can be dried, roasted, ground, and used as a coffee substitute.

== Description ==
T. perfoliatum grows as an unbranched, light green, hairy stem up to 61–107 cm (24–42 in) tall. Pairs of opposite leaves are joined around the stem, with each pair occurring at a 90-degree angle from the next one along the stem. Each leaf is up to 20 cm (8 in) long and 10 cm (4 in) across, with smooth margins.

The flowers are reddish-brown and are clustered on very short stems in the axils of the leaves. They are tubular with five small lobes. The fruit resembles small oranges and remains on the stalks in the fall. Each drupe contains three black nutlets.

== Etymology ==
The genus name Triosteum is a shortened form of the Greek word "triostospermum", meaning "three stony seeds". The specific epithet perfoliatum is from the Latin meaning "through the leaf", referring to the way the stem comes through each pair of joined leaves.

== Distribution and habitat ==
T. perfoliatum is native in the United States from Nebraska to the west, Louisiana to the south, Massachusetts to the east, and the Canadian border to the north. In Canada, it is native in Ontario, where it is an endangered species. In Louisiana, it is possibly extirpated. It is extremely rare in both Massachusetts, where it is endangered, and Rhode Island, where it is a species of concern. It can be found in open woods on hillsides or valleys in dry areas.

== Ecology ==
The flowers of T perfoliatum bloom May to July and attract various bees, particularly bumblebees (Bombus spp.) and anthophorid bees (Anthophora spp.). It is a larval host for Hemaris diffinis, the snowberry clearwing moth.
