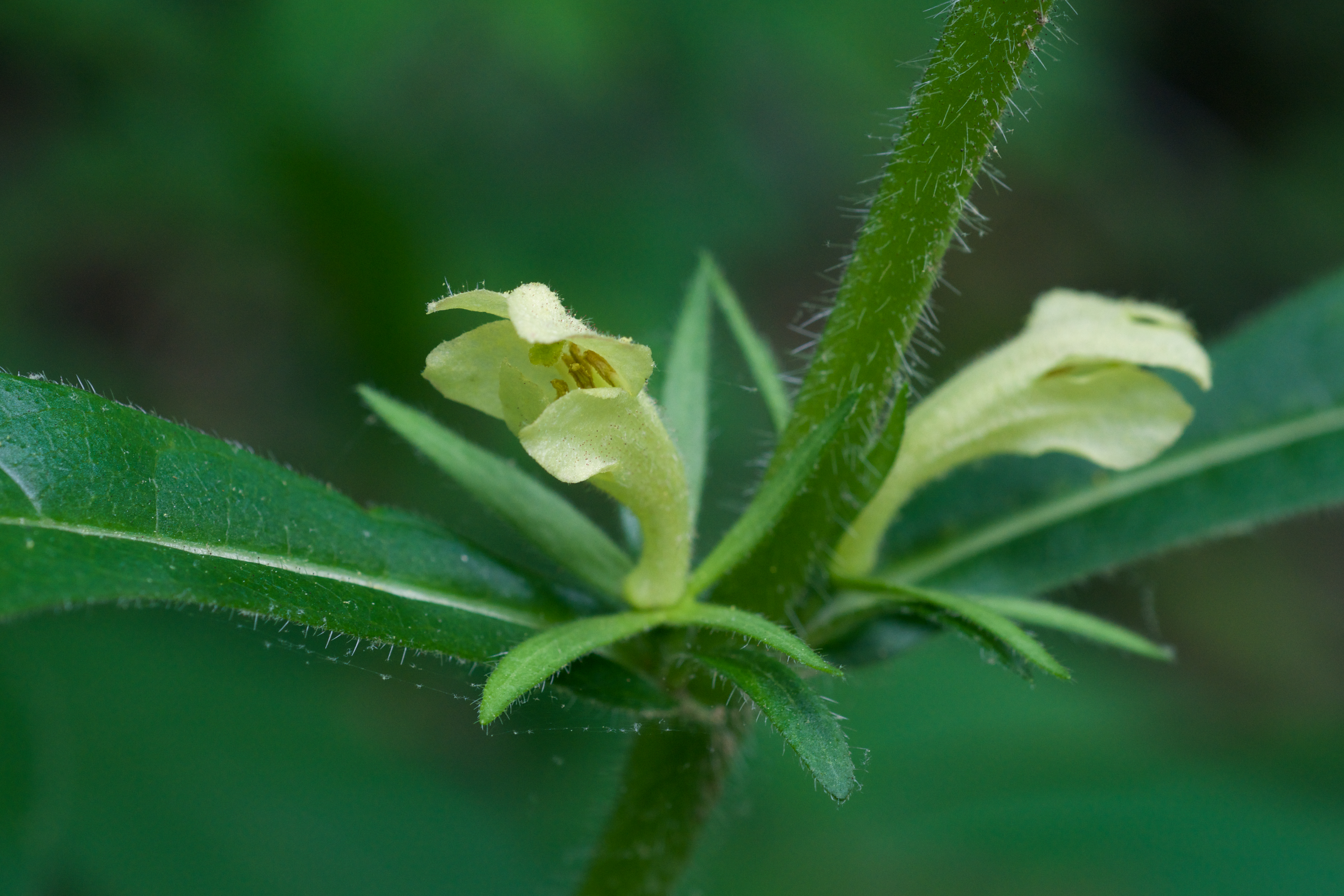

Scientific classification
- Kingdom: Plantae
- Clade: Tracheophytes
- Clade: Angiosperms
- Clade: Eudicots
- Clade: Asterids
- Order: Dipsacales
- Family: Caprifoliaceae
- Genus: Triosteum
- Species: T. angustifolium

Binomial name
- Triosteum angustifolium L.

= Triosteum angustifolium =

Species of flowering plant

Triosteum angustifolium, commonly known as yellowfruit horse-gentian, is a species of flowering plant belonging to the family Caprifoliaceae. It is found Eastern North America, primarily in Limestone regions.
