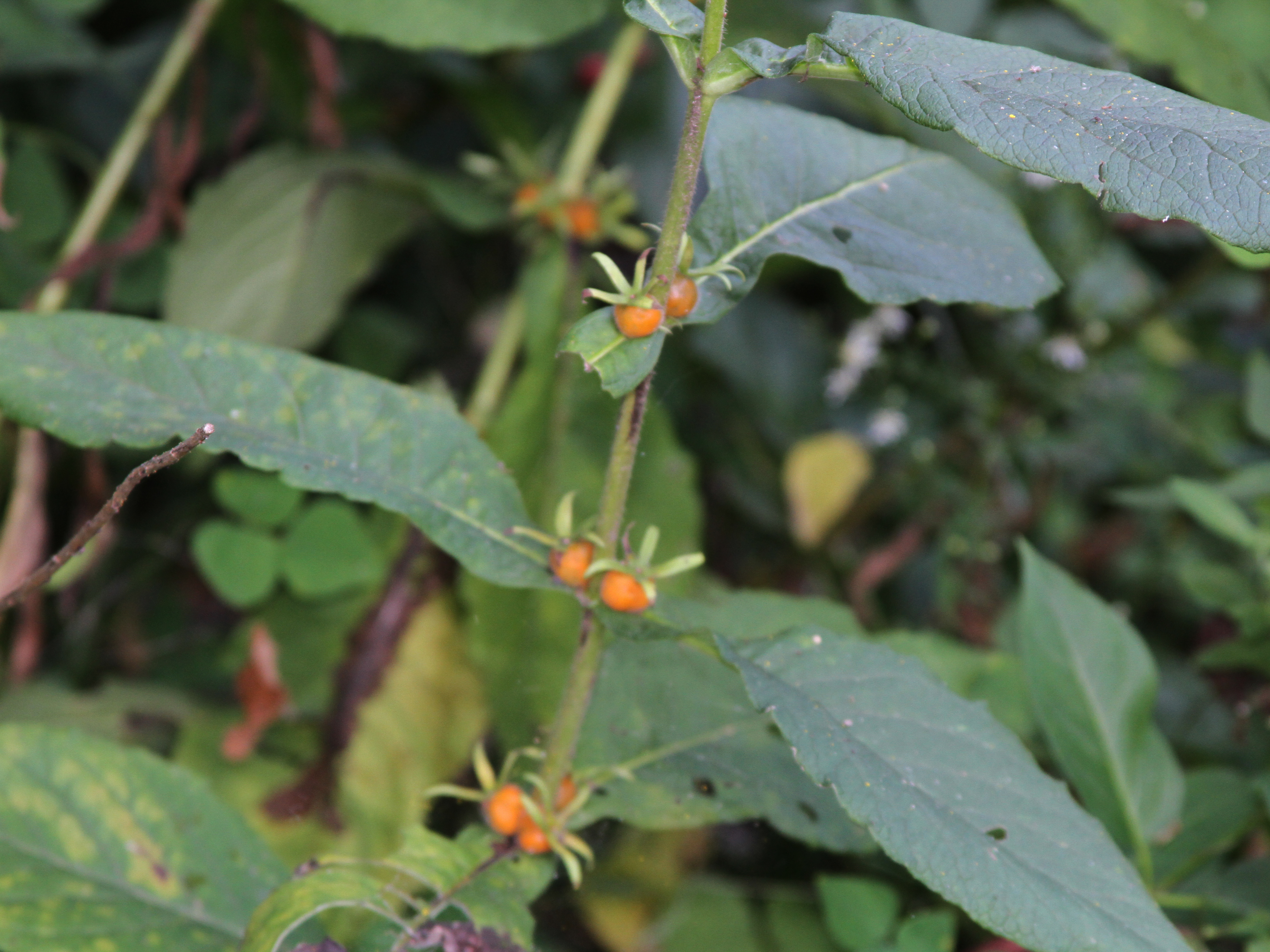

Conservation status
- Secure (NatureServe)

Scientific classification
- Kingdom: Plantae
- Clade: Tracheophytes
- Clade: Angiosperms
- Clade: Eudicots
- Clade: Asterids
- Order: Dipsacales
- Family: Caprifoliaceae
- Genus: Triosteum
- Species: T. aurantiacum

Binomial name
- Triosteum aurantiacum E.P.Bicknell
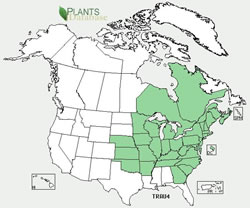
- Triosteum aurantiacum range

= Triosteum aurantiacum =

Species of flowering plant

Triosteum aurantiacum, also known as orangefruit horse-gentian, is a perennial species of Triosteum native to North America.

== Growth ==
Triosteum aurantiacum may grow from 2 to 4 feet (0.6 to 1.2 m) in height.

== Use ==
Triosteum aurantiacum has been used to treat a variety of medical issues by Native Americans, and can be used as a coffee substitute when roasted.
