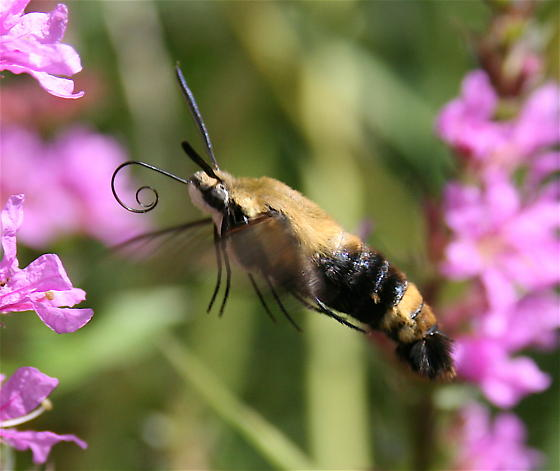
- Hemaris diffinis in Augusta, Michigan

Conservation status
- Secure (NatureServe)

Scientific classification
- Kingdom: Animalia
- Phylum: Arthropoda
- Clade: Pancrustacea
- Class: Insecta
- Order: Lepidoptera
- Family: Sphingidae
- Genus: Hemaris
- Species: H. diffinis

Binomial name
- Hemaris diffinis (Boisduval 1836)

Synonyms
- Macroglossa diffinis Boisduval, 1836; Macroglossa fumosa Strecker, 1874; Macroglossa aethra Strecker, 1875; Sesia axillaris Grote & Robinson, 1868; Sesia grotei Butler, 1874; Hemaris tenuis Grote, 1873; Hemaris marginalis Grote, 1873; Hemaris metathetis Butler, 1876; Haemorrhagia ariadne Barnes & McDunnough, 1910

= Hemaris diffinis =

Snowberry clearwing

Species of moth

Hemaris diffinis, the snowberry clearwing, is a moth of the family Sphingidae. This moth is sometimes called "hummingbird moth" or "flying lobster". This moth should not be confused with the hummingbird hawk-moth of Europe.

== Adults ==
It is about 32–51 millimetres (1.25–2 in). The moth's abdomen has yellow and black segments much like those of the bumblebee, for which it might be mistaken due to its color and flight pattern similarities. The moth's wings lack the large amount of scales found in most other lepidopterans, particularly in the centralized regions, making them appear clear. It loses the scales on its wings early after the pupa stage due to its highly active flight tendencies.

Hemaris diffinis is an excellent bumblebee mimic.

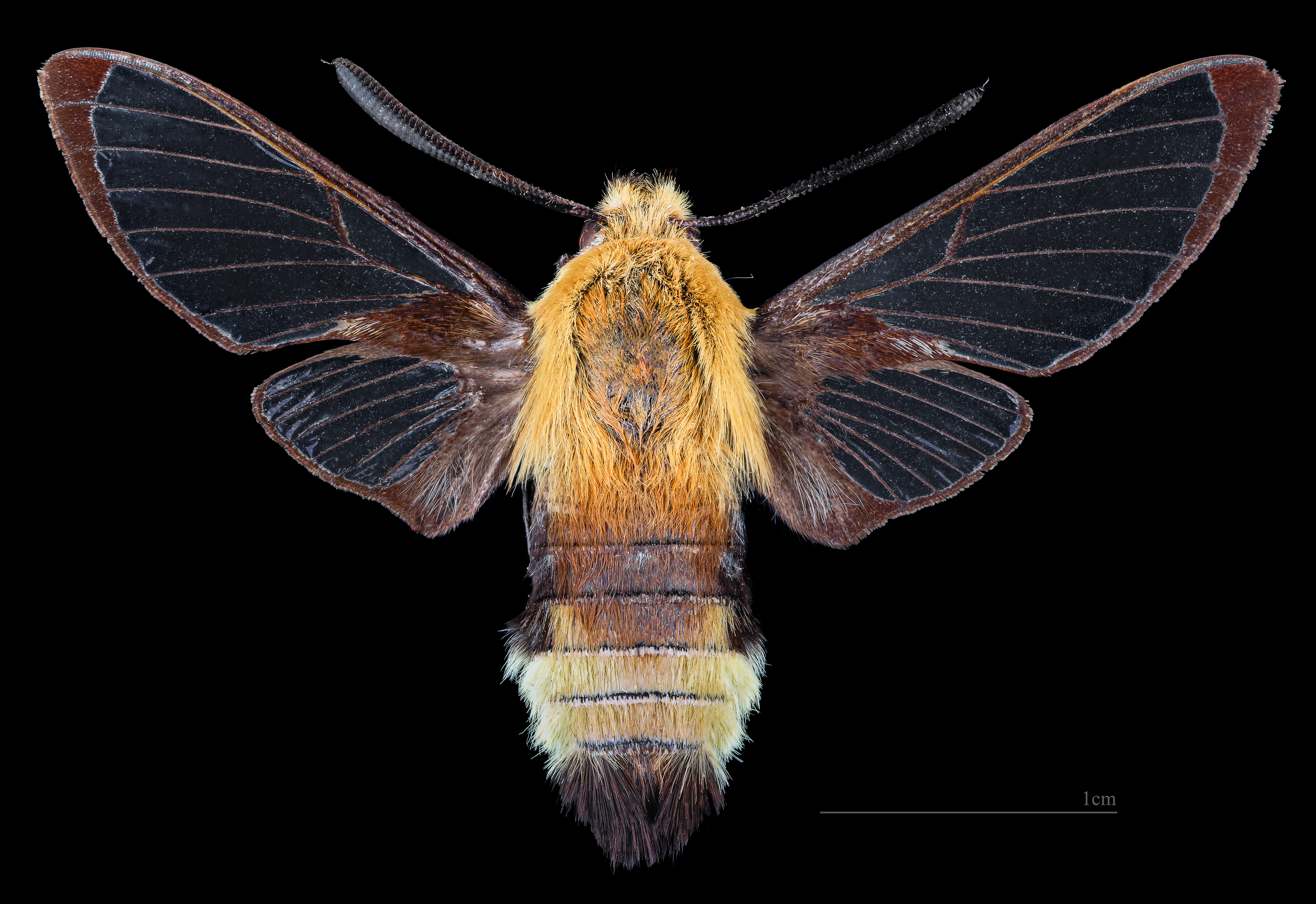
Male dorsal

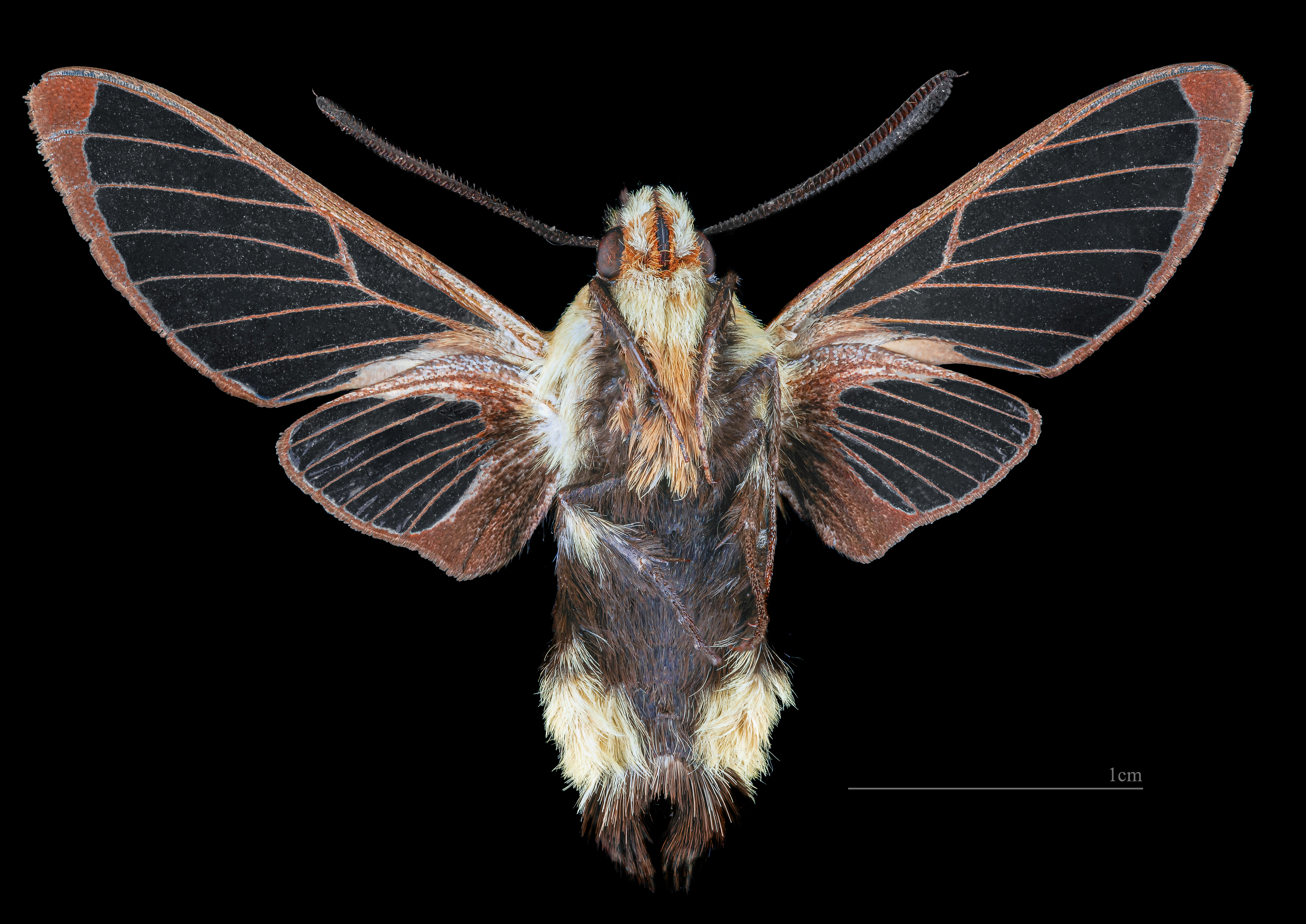
Male ventral

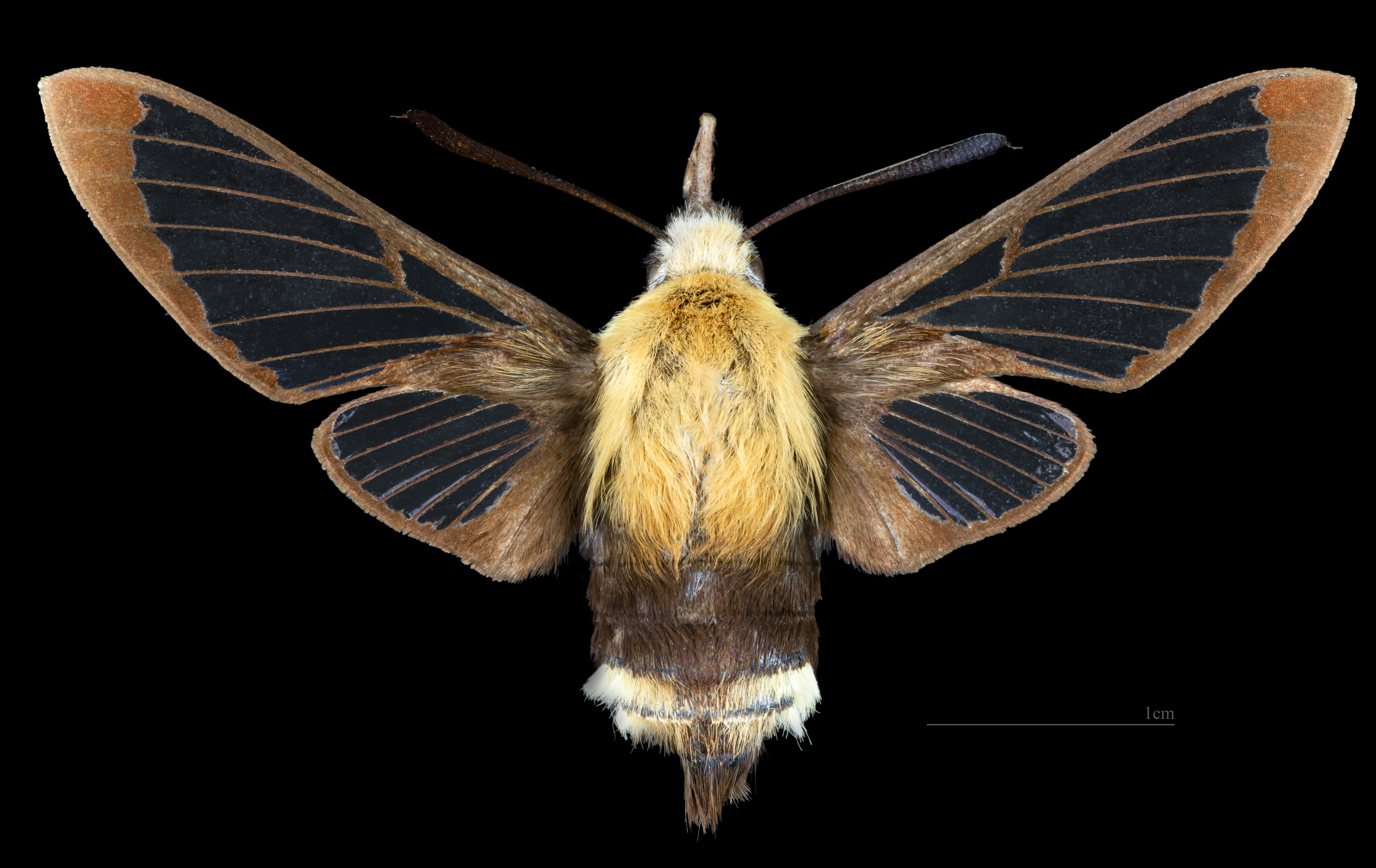
Female dorsal

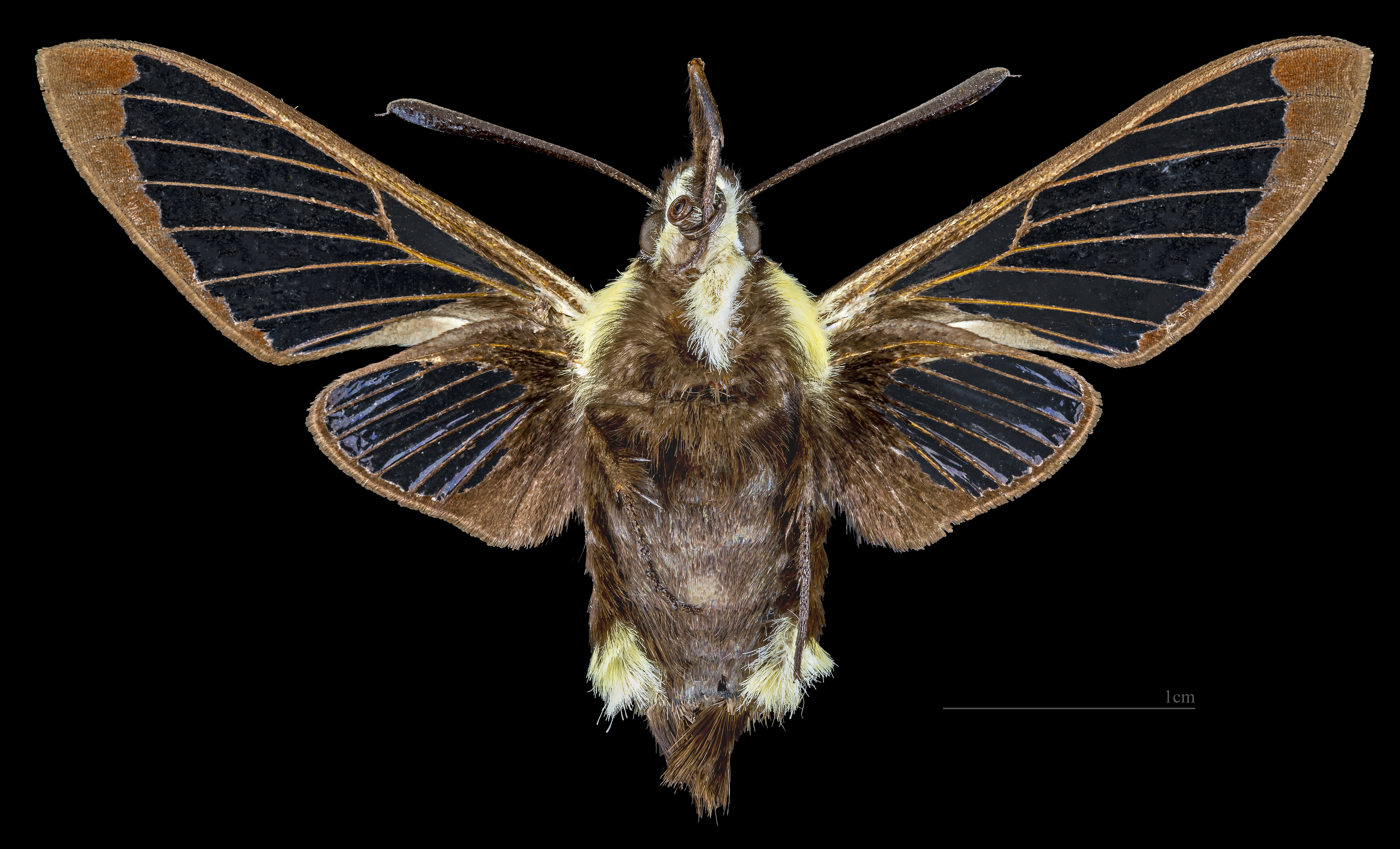
Female ventral

== Biology ==
It flies during the daylight much like the other hummingbird moths, but it may also continue flight into the evening, particularly if it has found a good source of nectar.

== Distribution ==
The moth is found in the Northwest Territories, British Columbia (including the Cariboo region), southern Ontario, eastern Manitoba, and western Quebec in Canada. In the United States, this species has been located in southern California and Baja California Norte, Illinois, and east through most of the United States from Maine to West Virginia to Florida.

== Food plants ==
The larvae feed on plants including dogbane (Apocynum), Lonicera, Viburnum, Amsonia, Triosteum, Diervilla, and Symphoricarpos.

== Regional names ==
Hemaris diffinis is notable for its colorful nicknames. In certain parts of Appalachia, including West Virginia, Hemaris diffinis is known as the "hummingbird moth" or "flying lobster". These nicknames are derived from its supposed physical resemblance to other (genetically unrelated) animals.

== Gallery ==
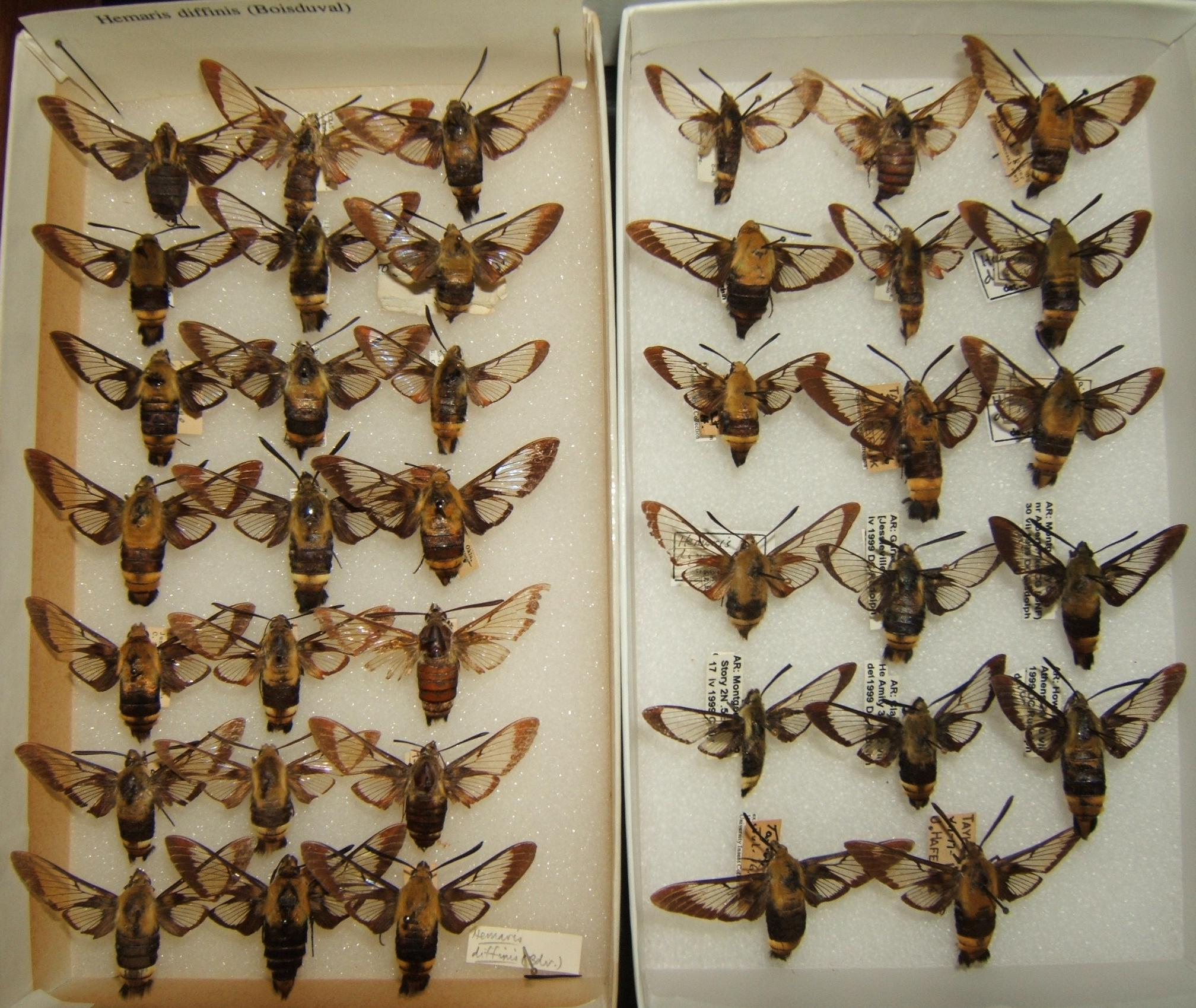
Hemaris diffinis variation

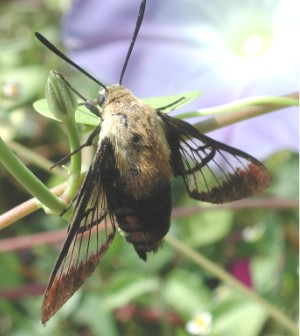
Snowberry clearwing (Hemaris diffinis), Lake Junaluska, North Carolina

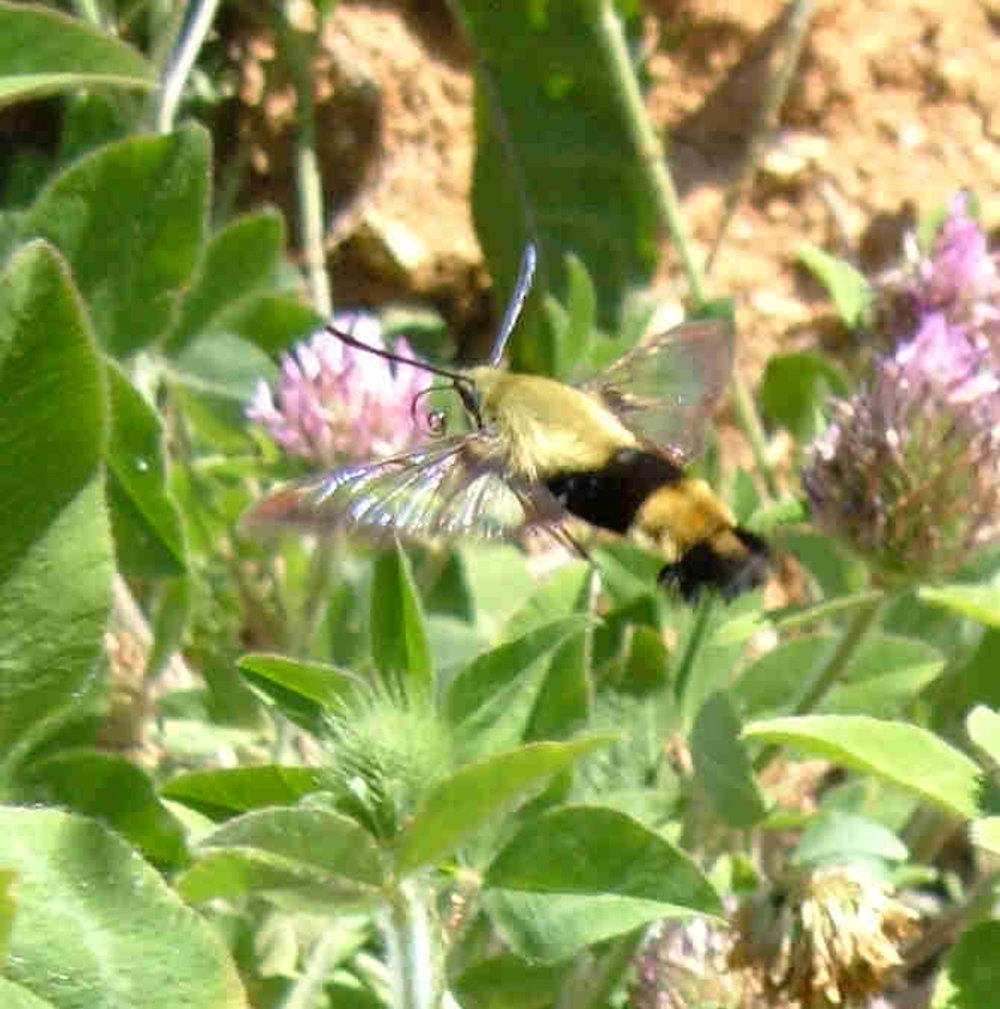
Snowberry clearwing in Elizabethtown, Kentucky

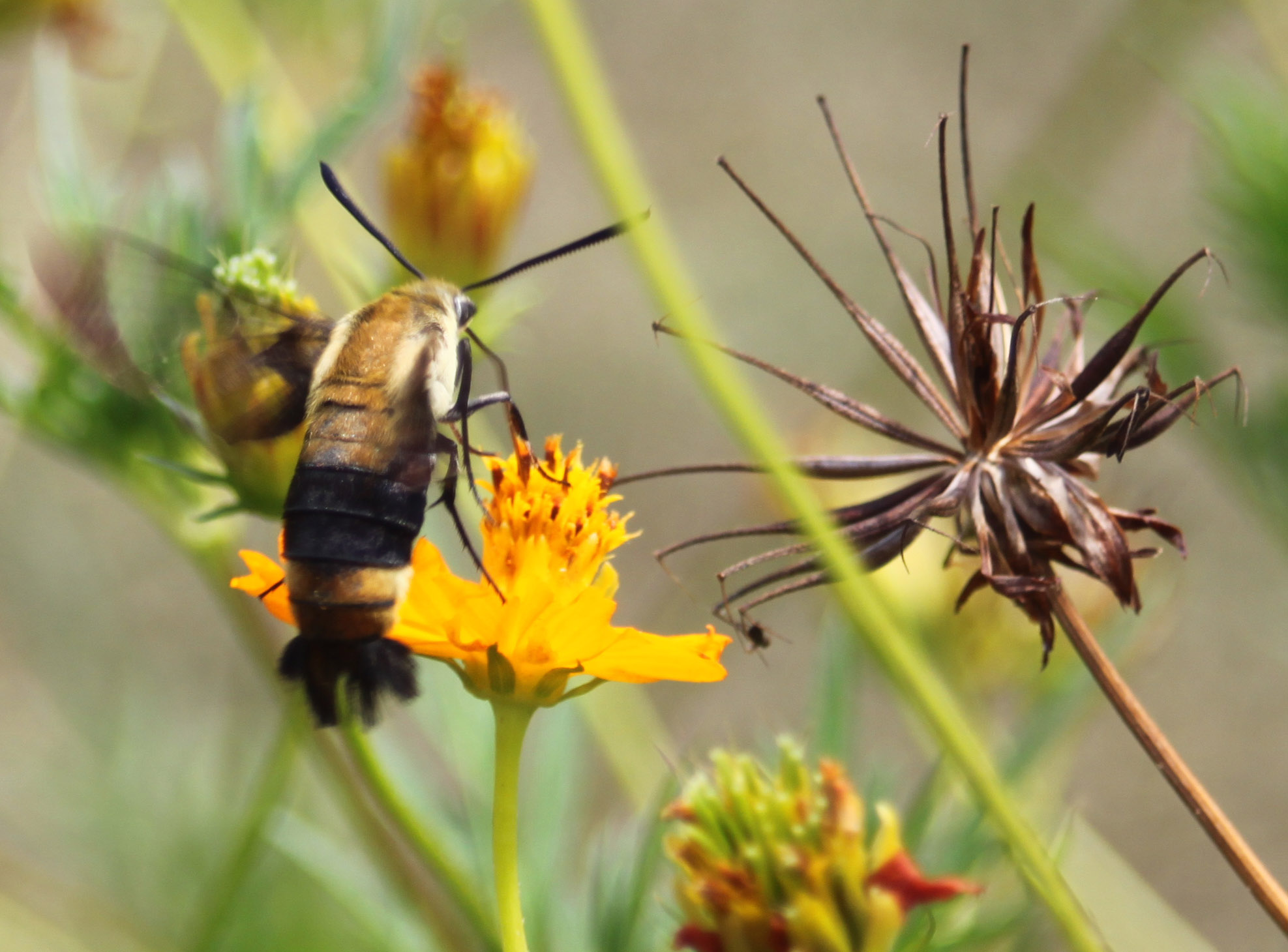
Hemaris diffinis on cosmos

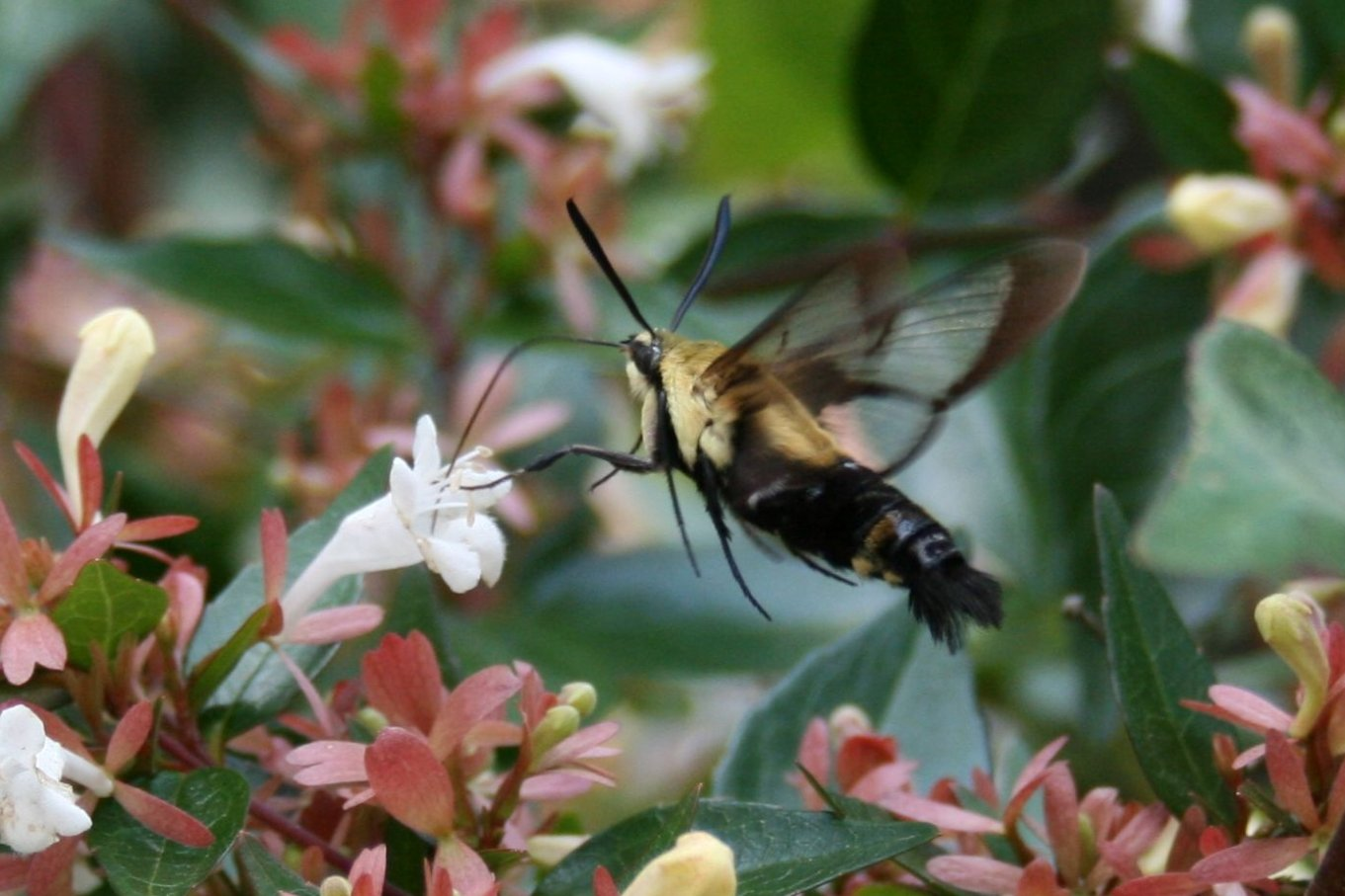
Hemaris diffinis nectaring on abelia

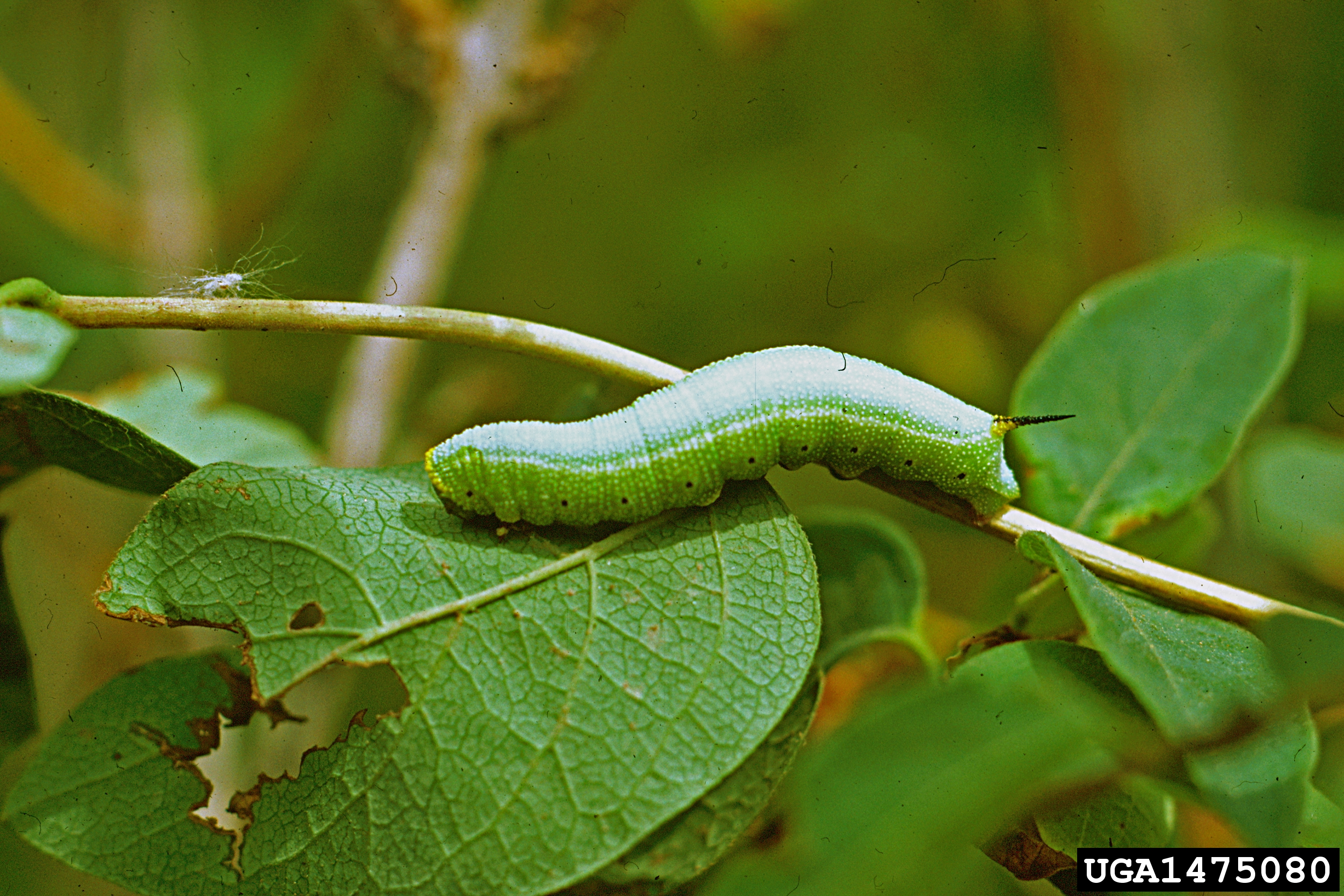
Caterpillar

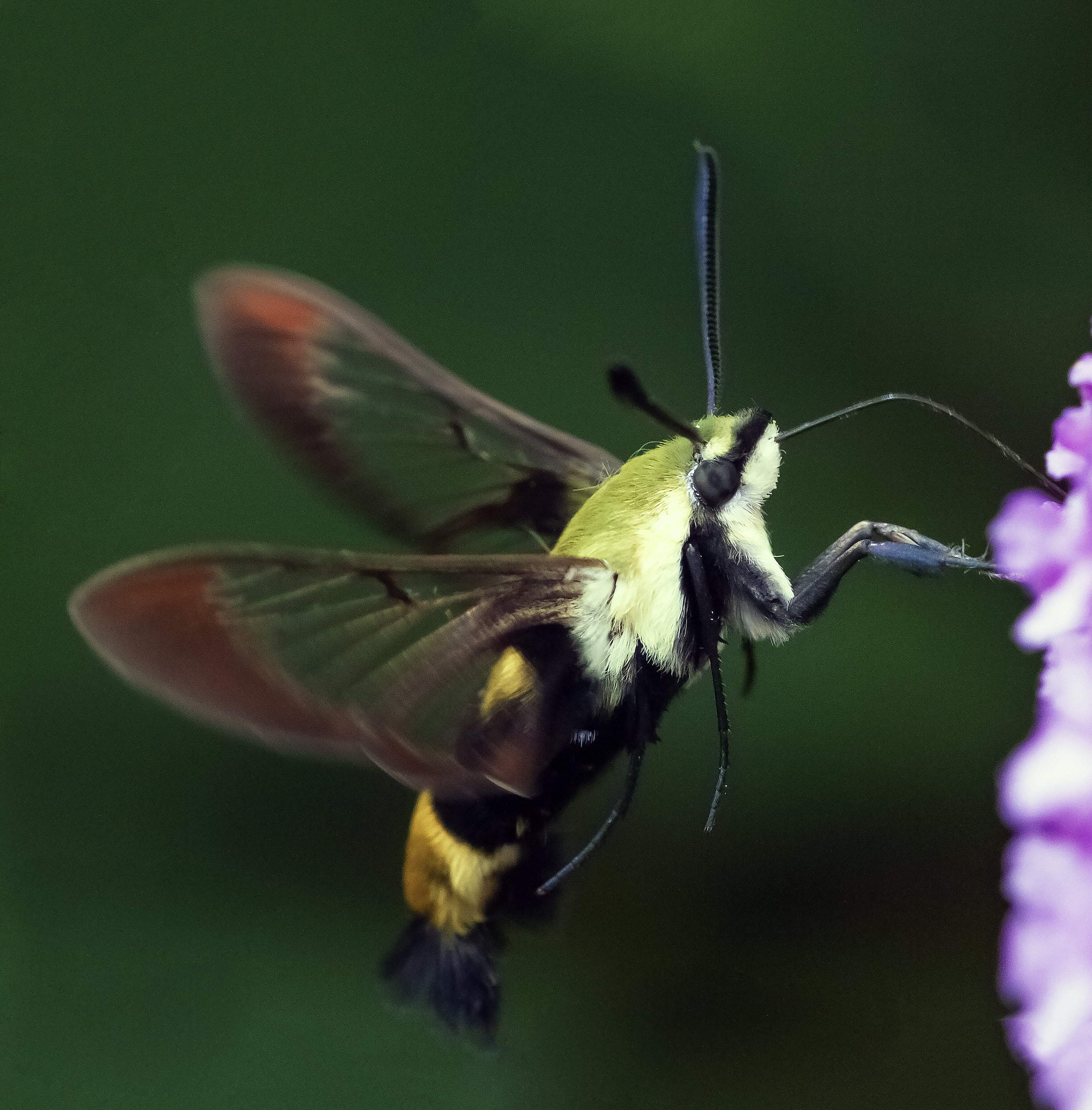
Feeding at Buddleja flower
