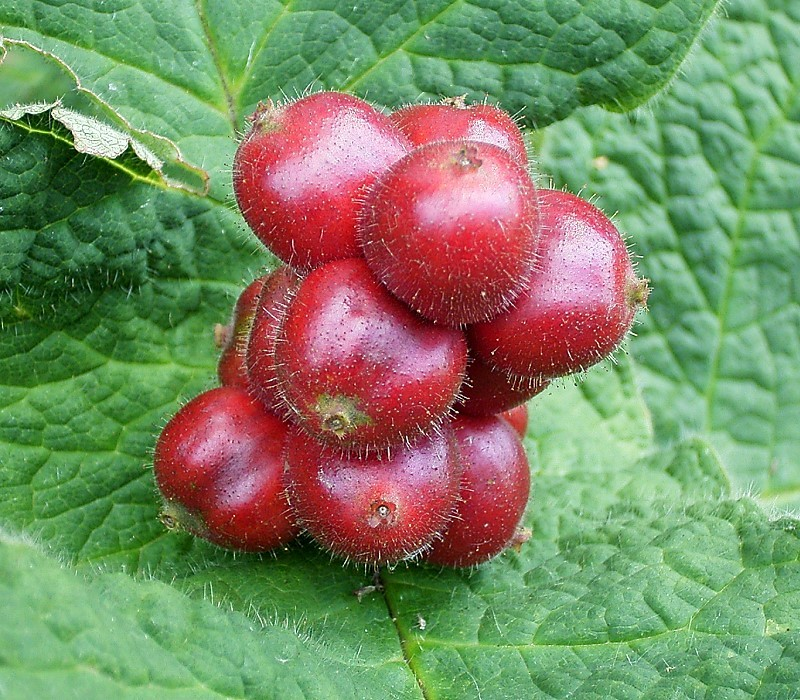
- Triosteum himalayanum fruits

Scientific classification
- Kingdom: Plantae
- Clade: Embryophytes
- Clade: Tracheophytes
- Clade: Angiosperms
- Clade: Eudicots
- Clade: Asterids
- Order: Dipsacales
- Family: Caprifoliaceae
- Subfamily: Caprifolioideae
- Genus: Triosteum; L. (1753)

Synonyms
- Karpaton Raf. (1817); Triosteon Dill. ex Adans. (1763), orth. var.; Triosteospermum Mill. (1754)

= Triosteum =

Genus of flowering plants

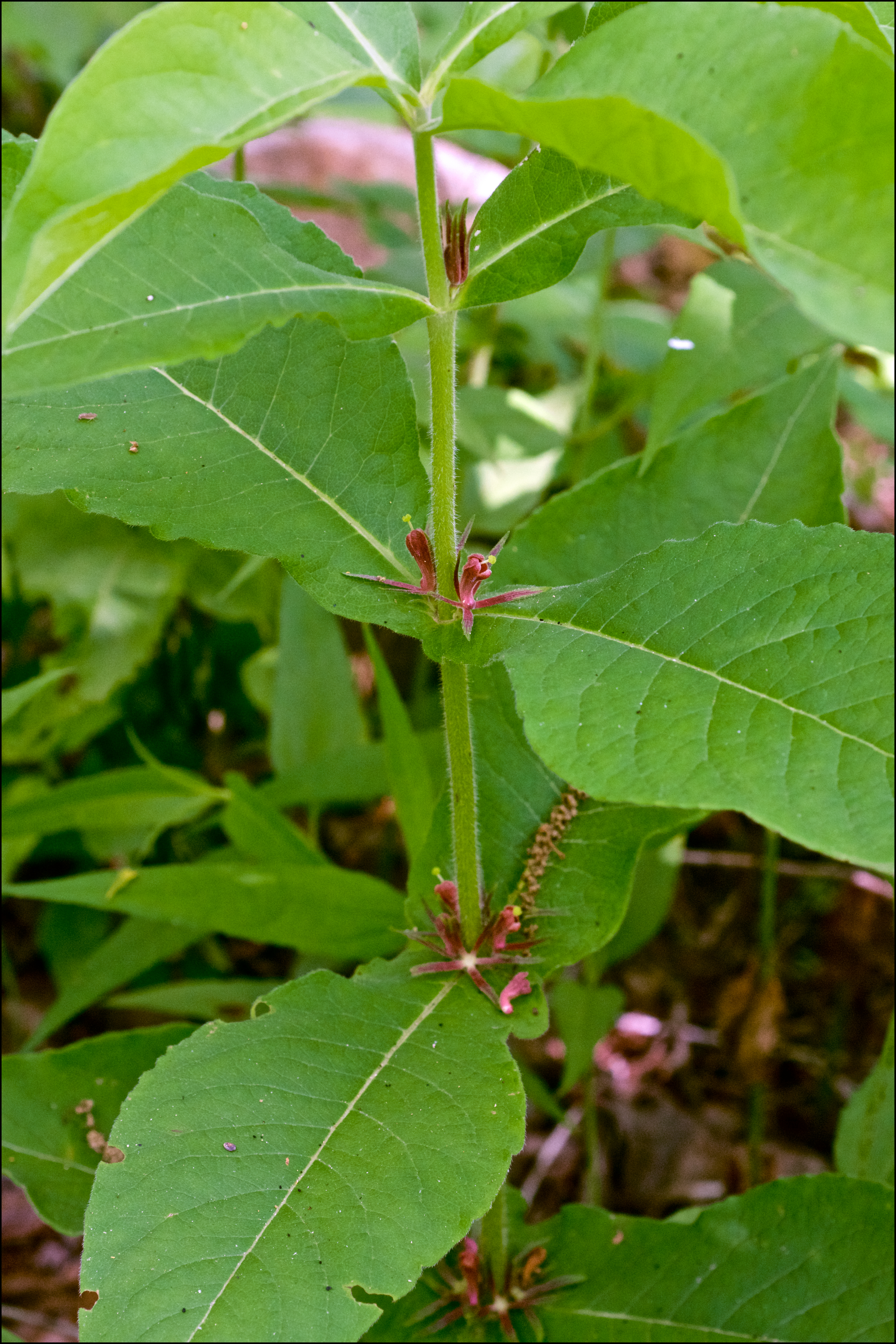
Triosteum perfoliatum

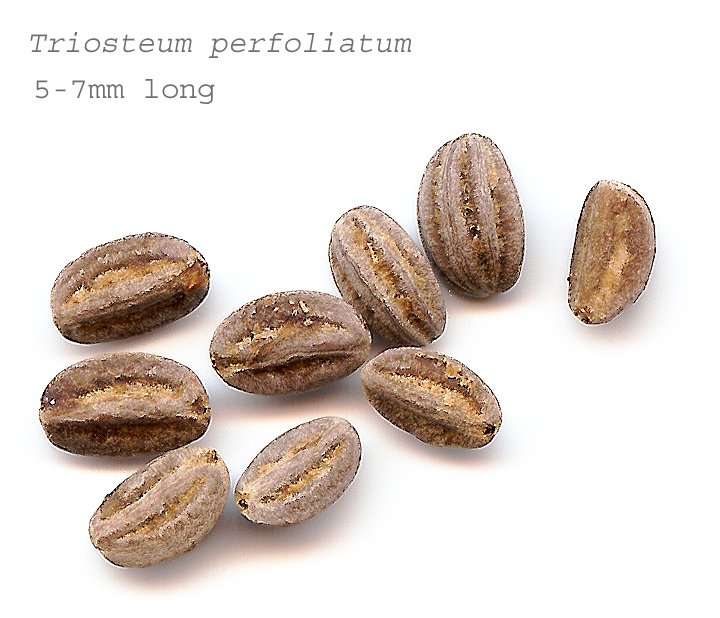
Pyrenes

Triosteum, commonly known in American English as horse-gentian or, less commonly, feverwort, and, in Standard Chinese as 莛子藨属 (ting zi biao shu), is a genus of flowering plants belonging to the family Caprifoliaceae. A genus of six species in total, it has three species native to North America, and three more in eastern Asia.

== Derivation of genus name ==
The name Triosteum is a compound of the Greek tria 'three' and osteon 'bone', in reference to the three hard pyrenes (pips or pits) in each drupe (berry) – giving the meaning 'having three pits (as hard as) bone'.

== Description ==
Triosteum spp. are perennial, herbaceous plants of rich woods. Each plant typically consists of at least one erect, round, hairy, fistular stem, 1 to 4 feet (0.3 to 1.2m) high, with opposite ovate-lanceolate entire leaves, and whitish to purplish flowers presented either in axillary whorls or terminal racemes. The fruit is a drupe. It may be white, yellow, orange, or red, depending on the species.

== Species ==
Six species, including three varieties, and one natural hybrid are currently accepted.

- Triosteum angustifolium L. – yellowfruit horse-gentian, native to the eastern United States
- Triosteum aurantiacum E.P.Bicknell – orangefruit horse-gentian, native to the eastern United States
  - Triosteum aurantiacum var. aurantiacum
  - Triosteum aurantiacum var. glaucescens Wiegand
  - Triosteum aurantiacum var. illinoense (Wiegand) E.J.Palmer & Steyerm. – named for the U.S. state of Illinois.
- Triosteum himalayanum Wall. – 穿心莛子藨 chuan xin ting zi biao, native to China, Bhutan, Nepal, and India
- Triosteum perfoliatum L. - feverwort, Native to the eastern United States
- Triosteum pinnatifidum Maxim – 莛子藨 ting zi biao, native to China and Japan
- Triosteum sinuatum Maxim. – 腋花莛子藨 ye hua ting zi biao, native to east Asia

== Cultivation ==
Certain species in the genus are sometimes cultivated for their colorful fruits, although the plants have been characterised as 'somewhat weedy perennials' and their flowers are, in general smaller and less showy than those of the related genus Lonicera, the honeysuckles.

== Uses ==
American species : the dried and roasted fruits have been occasionally used as a substitute for coffee; but they are chiefly valued for their medicinal properties, the roots having been used as an emetic and mild cathartic. The drug is sometimes called Tinker's root, after Dr. Tinker, who first brought it to notice.

Asiatic species : The ripe fruits of Triosteum himalayanum Wallich. have been used for 'blood purification' in the Himalayas. The concept of a medicinal plant that 'purifies the blood' is not one recognised by modern medicine, although the effects of plants believed in folk medicine and more recently in alternative medicine to possess such a property are often cholagogue, laxative and / or diuretic.

== Chemistry ==
Five monoterpene indole alkaloids (vincosamide-6′-O-β-d-glucopyranoside (1), vincosamide (2), strictosamide (3), strictosidine (4), and 5(S)-5-carboxystrictosidine (5)), two monoterpene diglycosides ( see Glycoside ) (urceolide (6) and 4(S)-4-hydroxyurceolide (7)) and 10 iridoids, ( triohimas A–C, naucledal, secologanin dimethyl acetal, grandifloroside, sweroside, loganin, vogeloside and (E)-aldosecologanin ) have recently been isolated from the roots of Triosteum pinnatifidum Maxim. Most of the iridoids in question were derived from loganin or secologanin with a glucose moiety at C-1 position and these findings indicate a close relationship between the genera Triosteum and Lonicera, and support the viewpoint that the iridoids derived from loganin or secologanin could be considered chemotaxonomic markers for the family Caprifoliaceae.
