= Fly honeysuckle =

Fly honeysuckle is a common name for several plants and may refer to:

- Lonicera canadensis - American fly honeysuckle
- Lonicera oblongifolia – Swamp fly honeysuckle
- Lonicera utahensis - fly honeysuckle
- Lonicera villosa – Mountain fly honeysuckle
- Lonicera xylosteum - (European) fly honeysuckle, dwarf honeysuckle, fly woodbine
- Lonicera caerulea - (Blue) fly honeysuckle, blue honeysuckle, sweetberry honeysuckle
