= Amberg Wildlife Area =

State Wildlife Area in Wisconsin

- Amberg State Wildlife Area
- IUCN category V (protected landscape/seascape)
- Location within Wisconsin Location within the United States
- Location: Marinette County, Wisconsin
- Nearest city: Niagara, Wisconsin
- Coordinates: 45°28′17.6″N 88°2′37.5″W
- Area: 1,190 acres (4.8 km^{2})
- Established: 1948
- Governing body: Wisconsin Department of Natural Resources

The Amberg Wildlife Area (AWA) is a 1,190-acre (480 ha) tract of protected land located in Marinette County, Wisconsin, managed by the Wisconsin Department of Natural Resources (WDNR). The wildlife area is surrounded by other protected areas, operated by either the county or other WDNR lands. The property was established in 1948, primarily to protect rare swamp conifer land, made up of 90-100 year old white cedar. The wildlife area is split up into two land management areas, the 909-acre (368 ha) native community management area of the Amberg Swamp Conifers and the eponymous 299-acre (121 ha) habitat management area.

== Land cover ==
Land to be used for the wildlife area was first acquired in 1948, to establish a protected habitat for deer. The AWA is included in the Northeast Sands property complex, which also includes the Pike Wild River complex, the Peshtigo River State Forest, and the Governor Thompson State Park. The Northeast Sands region is known for its extensive forest cover and high quality rivers.

Land cover
Cover type	Acres	Percentage cover
Forested wetland	887	76%
Upland coniferous forest	96	8%
Upland deciduous forest	147	13%
Upland grass	38	3%
Total acreage	1,168	100%

== Flora and fauna ==
There are multiple different species of trees that can be found in the wildlife area, most of which are native to Wisconsin. Notable examples include jack pine, black spruce, aspen, and northern pin oak. The area is home to large swathes of black ash trees, although the introduction of the emerald ash borer to the wider region has proved to be severely detrimental to the health of the black ash.

The AWA is encompassed within a larger habitat area, created specifically to address the conservation of birds. Notable or rare examples of birds that have been readily sighted in the area include the canada warbler, field sparrow, yellow-billed cuckoo, yellow-bellied flycatcher, and the wood thrush. In addition to birds, the area is home to a large number of deer and trout.

== See also ==
- Governor Thompson State Park
- Peshtigo River State Forest
