= Coniferous swamp =

Forested wetlands dominated by conifers

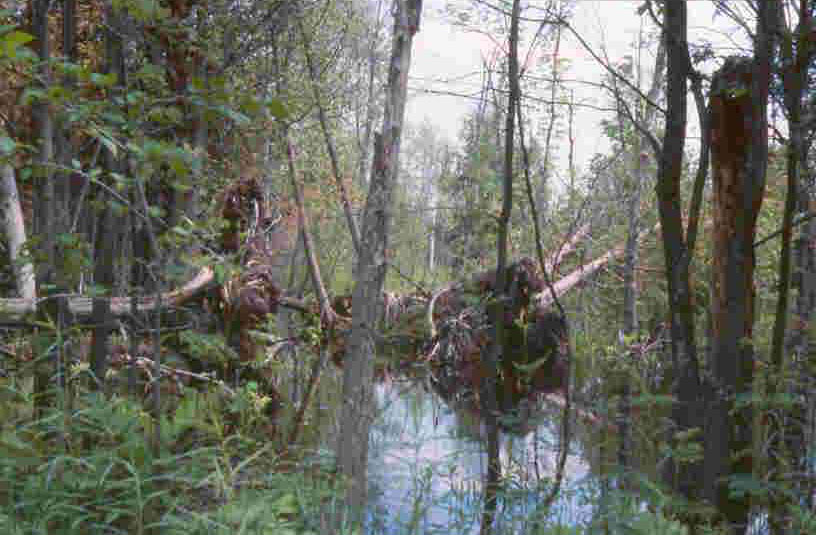
Dead Stream Swamp, Michigan: a northern white cedar swamp

Coniferous swamps are forested wetlands in which the dominant trees are lowland conifers such as northern white cedar (Thuja occidentalis). The soil in these swamp areas is typically saturated for most of the growing season and is occasionally inundated by seasonal storms or by winter snow melt.

The substrate is usually organic in nature and may contain peat in varying amounts, or it may be composed entirely of muck. The swamp substrate is typically nutrient-rich and neutral to alkaline, but can be acidic and nutrient-poor.

Coniferous swamps vary in composition, with different species of conifer dominating, and varying amounts of deciduous hardwoods growing within the swamp. A wide diversity of plants is represented within the swamps, with certain species dominating in a variety of microhabitats dependent on factors such as available sunlight (as in cases of trees downed by wind or disease), Soil pH, standing groundwater, and differences of elevation within the swamp such as tussocks and nurse logs.

The different types of coniferous swamps are named according to their dominant trees. In North America, a rich conifer swamp is dominated by northern white cedar and typically occurs south of the climatic tension zone throughout the Midwest and northeastern United States and adjacent areas in Canada. North of this climatic tension zone, tamarack (Larix laricina) is the dominant species of conifer in minerotrophic wetlands classified as rich tamarack swamp. A roughly equal mix of hardwood trees and conifers is known as a hardwood-conifer swamp.

== Rich conifer swamp ==
=== Flora ===
==== Trees ====
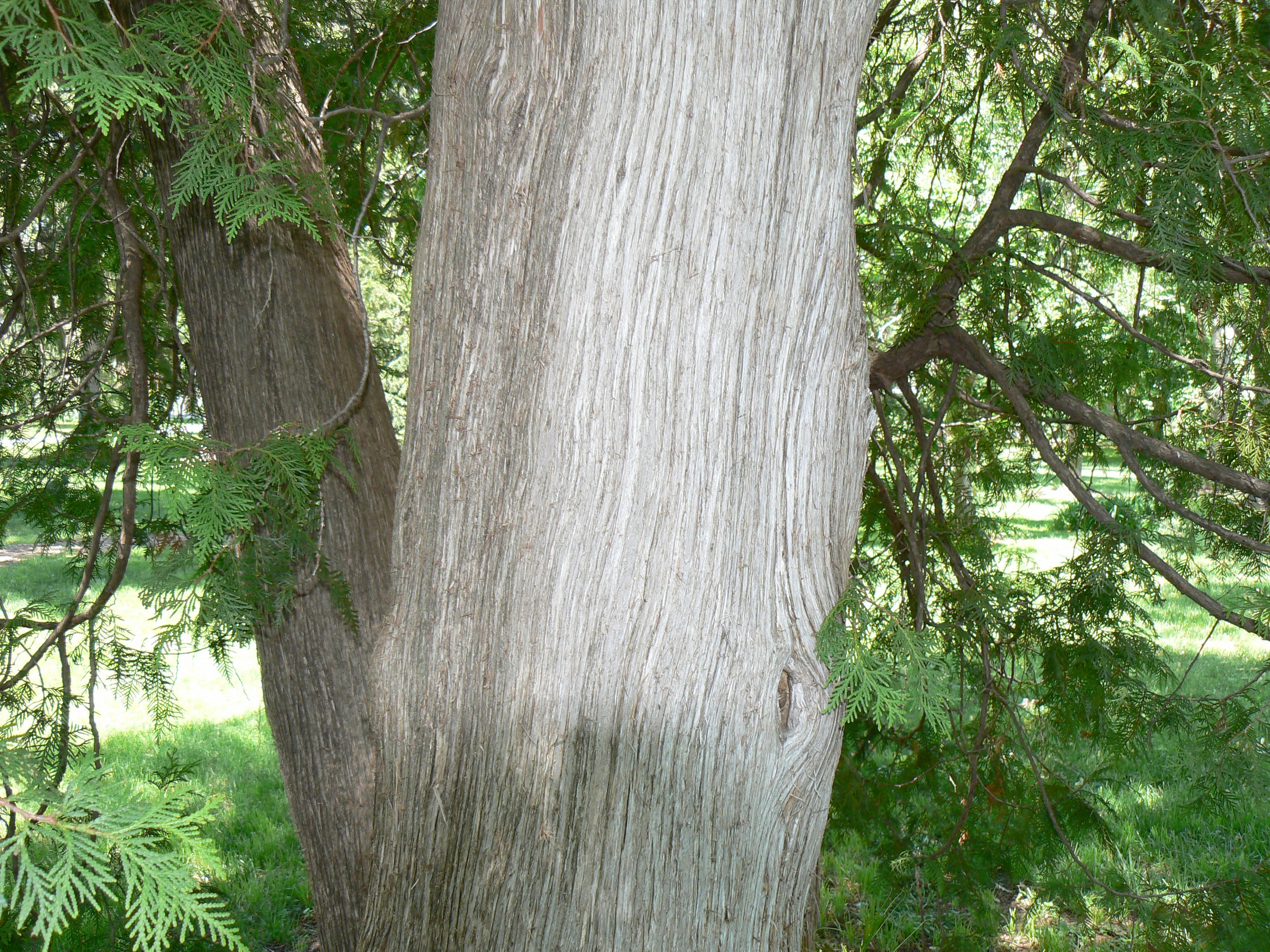
Bark of the northern white cedar

A variety of both evergreen and deciduous trees may be present in the rich conifer swamp in addition to the dominant species.

- Thuja occidentalis: Northern white cedar, the dominant conifer, also known as arborvitae, a common landscape specimen in northern U.S. states and Canada.
- Abies balsamea: Balsam fir
- Acer rubrum: Red maple
- Betula papyrifera: Paper birch
- Chamaecyparis thyoides: Atlantic white-cedar
- Cornus stolonifera: Red-osier dogwood
- Cornus florida: Flowering dogwood
- Larix laricina: Tamarack
- Picea mariana: Black spruce
- Picea glauca: White spruce
- Pinus strobus: White pine
- Taxodium distichum: Bald cypress
- Tsuga canadensis: Hemlock
- Ulmus americana: American elm
- Populus tremuloides: Quaking aspen
- Populus balsamifera: Balsam poplar
- Nyssa aquatica: Water tupelo
- Nyssa ogeche: White tupelo
- Nyssa sylvatica: Black tupelo
- Alnus glutinosa: Common alder

==== Shrubs ====
- Alnus rugosa Tag elder
- Ilex verticillata Winterberry
- Ilex mucronata Mountain holly
- Sambucus racemosa Red elderberry
- Gaylussacia baccata Huckleberry
- Taxus canadensis Canadian yew
- Lonicera canadensis American fly honeysuckle
- Lonicera oblongifolia Swamp fly honeysuckle
- Vaccinium angustifolium Low sweet blueberry
- Vaccinium myrtilloides Canada blueberry
- Ribes americanum Wild black currant
- Ribes triste Swamp red currant
- Ribes lacustre Swamp black currant

==== Vines ====
- Toxicodendron radicans Poison ivy
- Lonicera dioica Limber honeysuckle

==== Ferns ====
- Osmunda cinnamomea Cinnamon fern
- Thelypteris palustris Marsh fern
- Osmunda spectabilis Royal fern
- Gymnocarpium dryopteris Oak fern

==== Gramminoids ====
A variety of grasses and sedges may be present including multiple varieties of carex.

- Glyceria striata Fowl manna grass

==== Mosses ====
- Callicladium haldanianum Callicladium moss
- Sphagnum centrale

==== Orchids ====
- Cypripedium calceolus Yellow lady’s-slipper
- Platanthera hyperborea Tall northern bog orchid

==== Forbs ====
- Aquilegia canadensis Red Columbine
- Sarracenia purpurea Purple pitcher plant

== See also ==
- Freshwater swamp forest
- Peat swamp forest
- Swamp
