= Honeyberry =

Honeyberry or honey berry is a common name for the edible fruits of several plants and may refer to:

- Mamoncillo, or Spanish lime (Melicoccus bijugatus), a soapberry tree with an edible fruit described as between a lychee and a lime.
- Blue-berried honeysuckle (Lonicera caerulea), a species of honeysuckle with an edible, blueberry-like fruit.
- European nettle tree, (Celtis australis), a deciduous tree with edible, dark purple, sweet, berry-like fruit.
