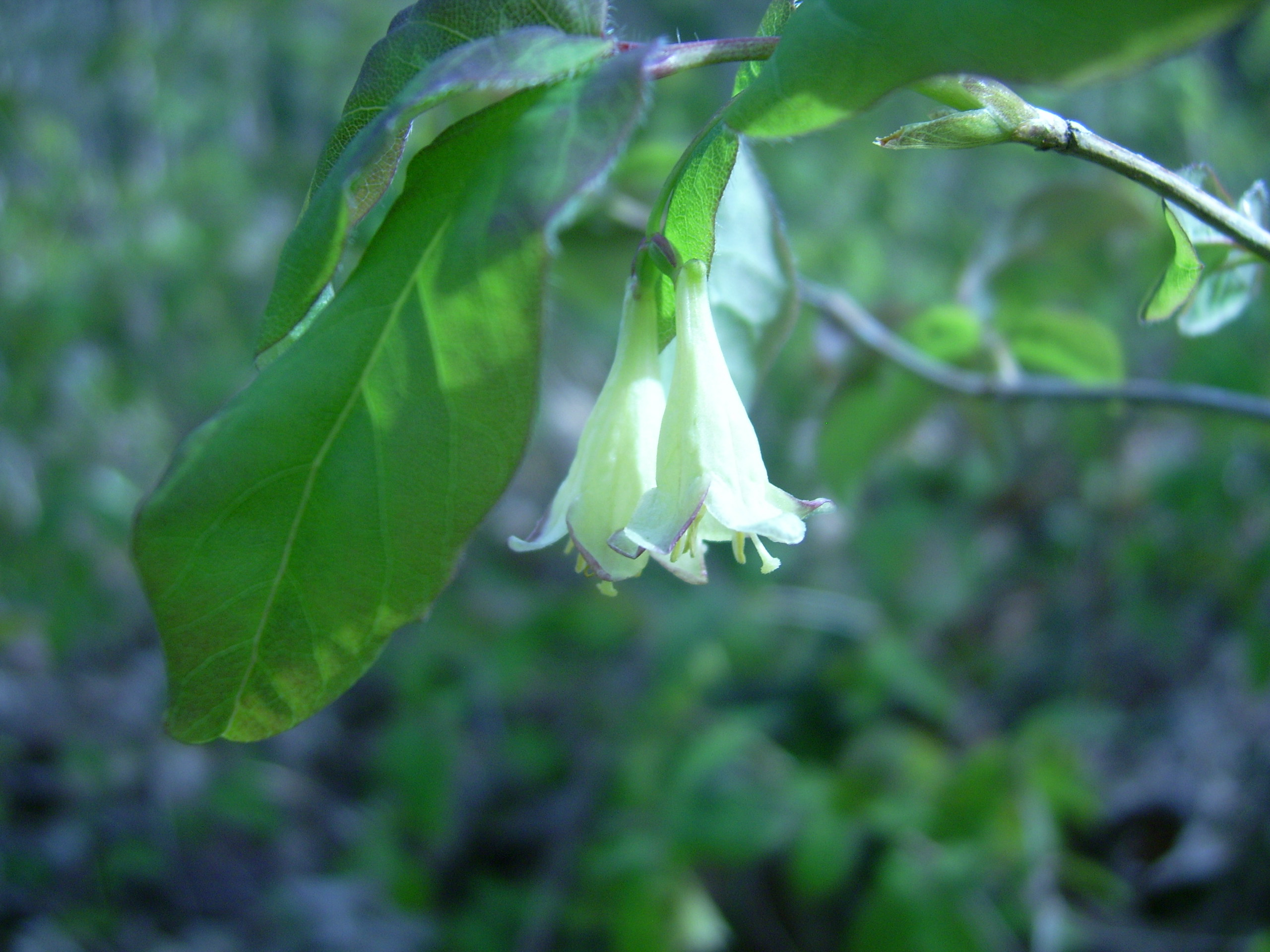

Scientific classification
- Kingdom: Plantae
- Clade: Tracheophytes
- Clade: Angiosperms
- Clade: Eudicots
- Clade: Asterids
- Order: Dipsacales
- Family: Caprifoliaceae
- Genus: Lonicera
- Species: L. canadensis

Binomial name
- Lonicera canadensis Bartram ex Marsh
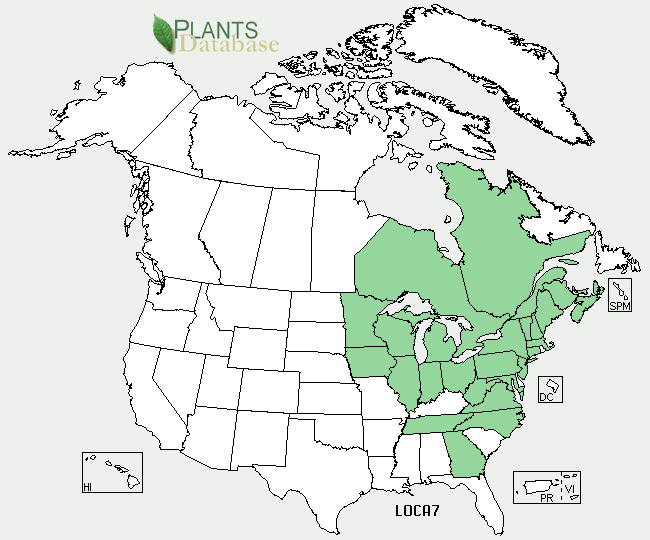

= Lonicera canadensis =

Species of honeysuckle

Lonicera canadensis (American fly honeysuckle or Canada fly honeysuckle) is a flowering deciduous, perennial, phanerophytic shrub which is monoclinous and grows 1–2 m (3 ft 3 in – 6 ft 7 in) tall. It typically flowers from the last week of April until the third or fourth week of May. Fruit appears approximately the first week of June until the first week of August. The fruit is fed upon by a variety of avian frugivores including the American robin (Turdus migratorius) and northern cardinal (Cardinalis cardinalis).

The seeds can remain viable after being maintained for several years in dry storage at room temperature.

- Habitat: Dry to moist upland woods, occasionally found in coniferous swamps and growing along streams.
- Stems: The main stems are light brown round, fibrous or furrowed bark not exfoliating, ascending or erect. The branches grow ascending or horizontal.
- Distribution: Native to northeastern North America.

United States—CT, GA, IA, IL, IN?, KY?, MA, MD, ME, MI, MN, NC, NH, NJ, NY, OH, PA, TN, VA, VT, WI, WV

Canada—NB, NS, ON, PE, QC

- Rarity Status Global Conservation Status Rank—G5

Threatened and Endangered Information: Lonicera canadensis Bartram ex Marsh.

This plant is listed by the U.S. federal government or a state. Common names are from state and federal lists. Click on a place name to get a complete protected plant list for that location.

- Indiana: American fly-honeysuckle, Extirpated
- Maryland: Canada honeysuckle, Endangered
- New Jersey: American fly-honeysuckle, Endangered
- Tennessee: American fly-honeysuckle, Special Concern

Wetland Indicator Status: FACU (Facultative Upland) Usually occurs in non-wetlands (estimated probability 67%–99%), but occasionally found on wetlands (estimated probability 1%-33%).
