= Wetland indicator status =

Classification of United States plant species by frequency of occurrence in wetlands

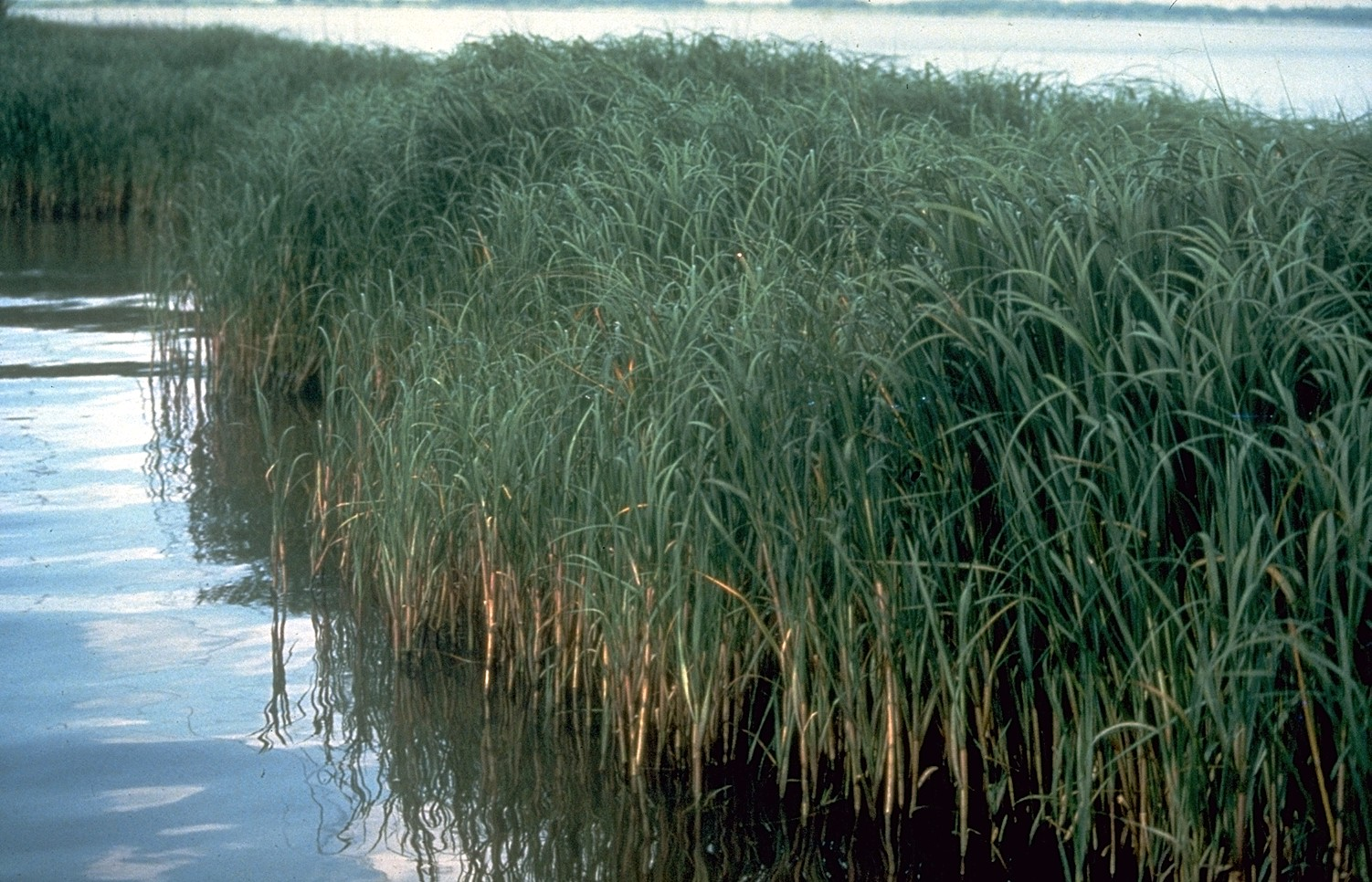
Smooth cordgrass (Spartina alterniflora), an Obligate Wetland (OBL) species in a salt marsh

Wetland indicator status denotes the probability of individual species of vascular plants occurring in freshwater, brackish and saltwater wetlands in the United States. The wetland status of 7,000 plants is determined upon information contained in a list compiled in the National Wetland Inventory undertaken by the U.S. Fish and Wildlife Service and developed in cooperation with a federal inter-agency review panel (Reed, 1988). The National List was compiled in 1988 with subsequent revisions in 1996 and 1998.

The wetland indicator status of a species is based upon the individual species' occurrence in wetlands in 13 separate regions within the United States. In some instances the specified regions contain all or part of different floristic provinces and the tension zones which occur between them.

While many Obligate Wetland (OBL) species do occur in permanently or semi-permanently flooded wetlands, there are also a number of obligates that occur in temporary or seasonally flooded wetlands. A few species are restricted entirely to these transient-type wetland environments.

Plant species are general indicators of various degrees of environmental factors; they are however not precise. The presence of a plant species at a specific site depends on a variety of climatic, edaphic and biotic factors, and the effect of individual factors such as degree of substrate saturation and depth and duration of standing water is impossible to isolate.

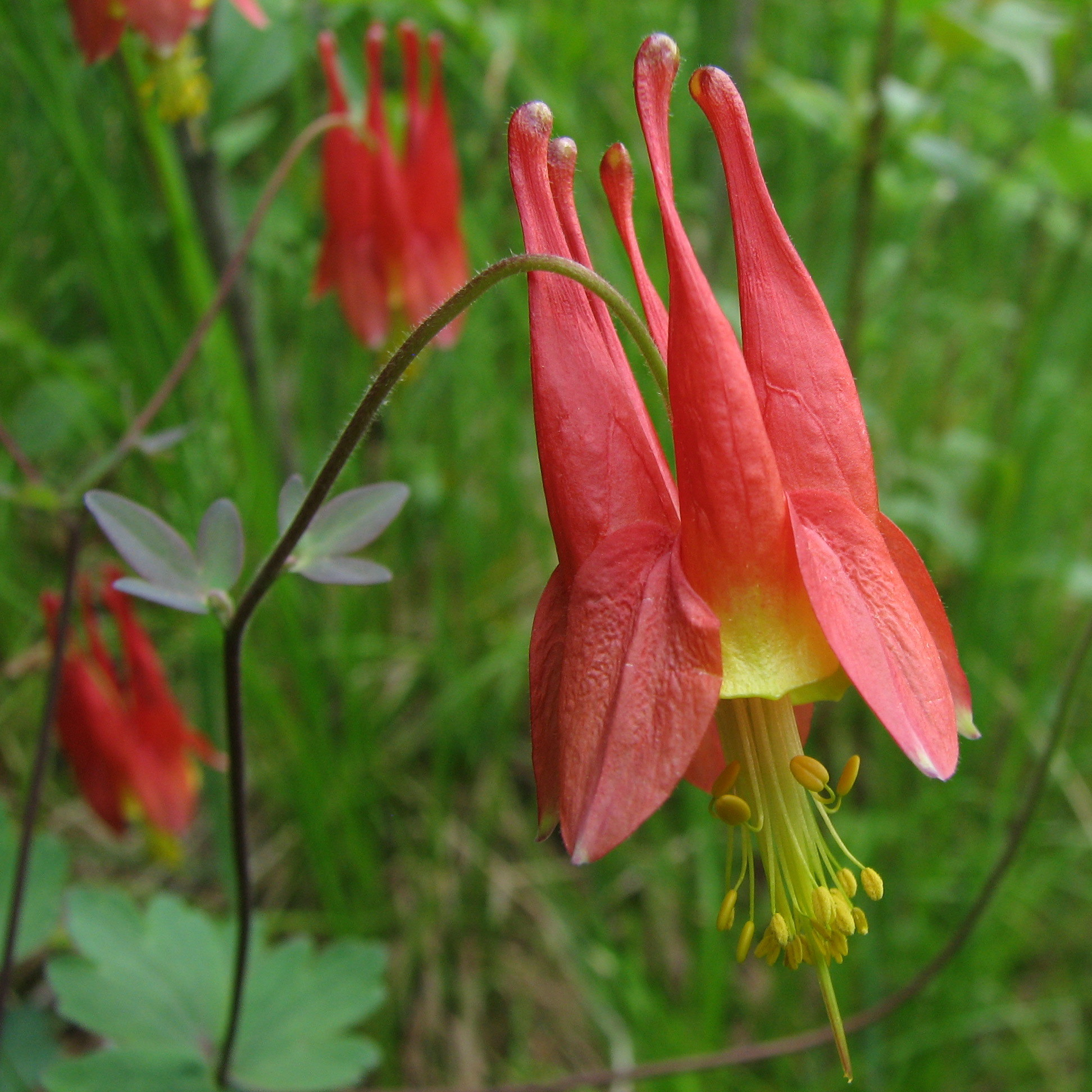
Eastern red columbine (Aquilegia canadensis), a facultative wetland (FACW) species in Region 1–5; freshwater wetlands

A plant's indicator status is applied to the species as a whole however individual variations may exist within the species, referred to as "ecotypes"; individual plants which may have adapted to specific environments as may occur in a microhabitat, which isn't indicative of the species as a whole. The morphological differences between these ecotypes and the relevant species may or may not be easily discerned.

== Indicator categories ==
- Obligate wetland (OBL) - Almost always occurs in wetlands under natural conditions (estimated probability > 99%).
- Facultative wetland (FACW) - Usually occurs in wetlands (estimated probability 67% – 99%), but occasionally found in non-wetlands (estimated probability 1% – 33%).
- Facultative (FAC) - Equally likely to occur in wetlands and non-wetlands (estimated probability 34% – 66%).
- Facultative upland (FACU) - Usually occurs in non-wetlands (estimated probability 67% – 99%), but occasionally found in wetlands (estimated probability 1% – 33%).
- Obligate upland (UPL) - Almost always occurs in non-wetlands under natural conditions (estimated probability > 99%).

A positive (+) or negative (−) sign is used for the facultative categories. The (+) sign indicates a frequency towards the wetter end of the category (more frequently found in wetlands) and the (−) sign indicates a frequency towards the drier end of the category (less frequently found in wetlands).

== Wetland regions ==
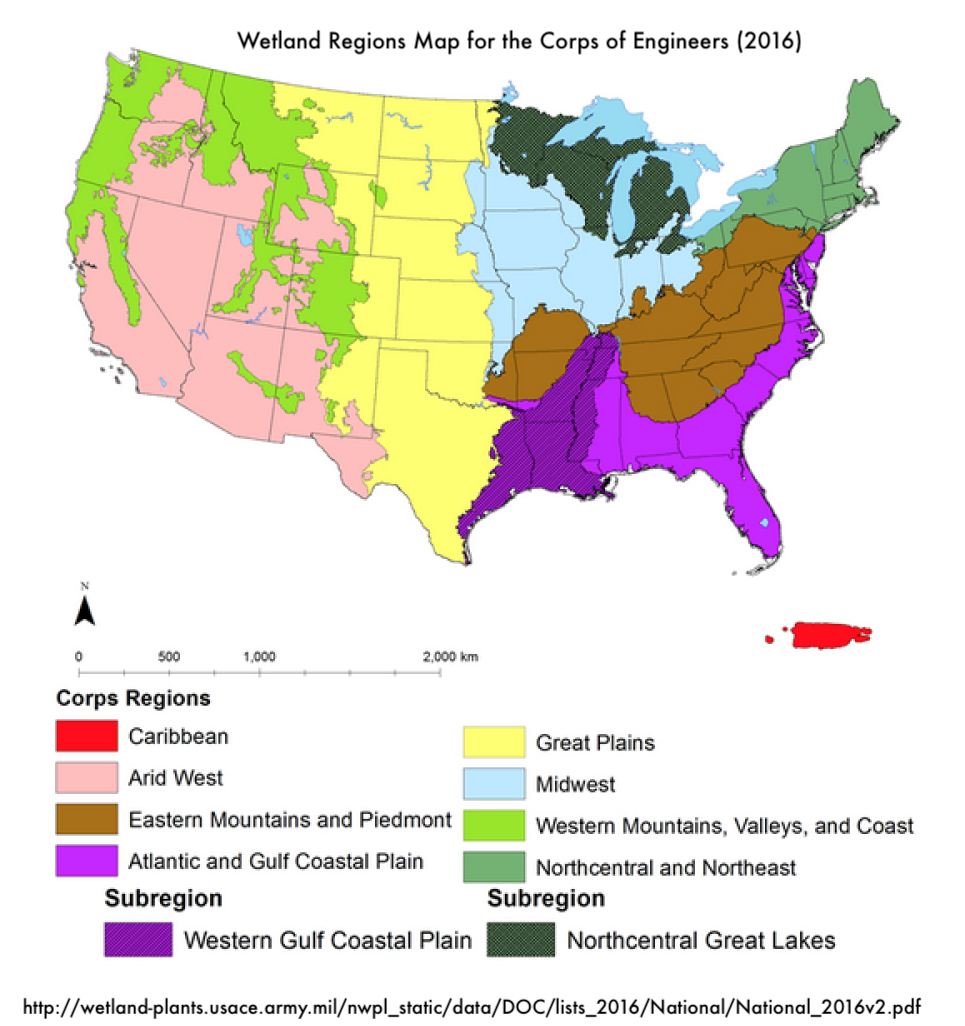
Wetland Regions Map for the United States Army Corps of Engineers (2016), showing continental U.S. and Caribbean.

Corps wetland regions are defined as follows:

- AGCP = Atlantic and Gulf Coastal Plain
- AW = Arid West
- CB = Caribbean
- EMP = Eastern Mountains and Piedmont
- GP = Great Plains
- HI = Hawaii
- MW = Midwest
- NCNE = Northcentral and Northeast
- WMVC = Western Mountains, Valleys, and Coast
- AK = Alaska
