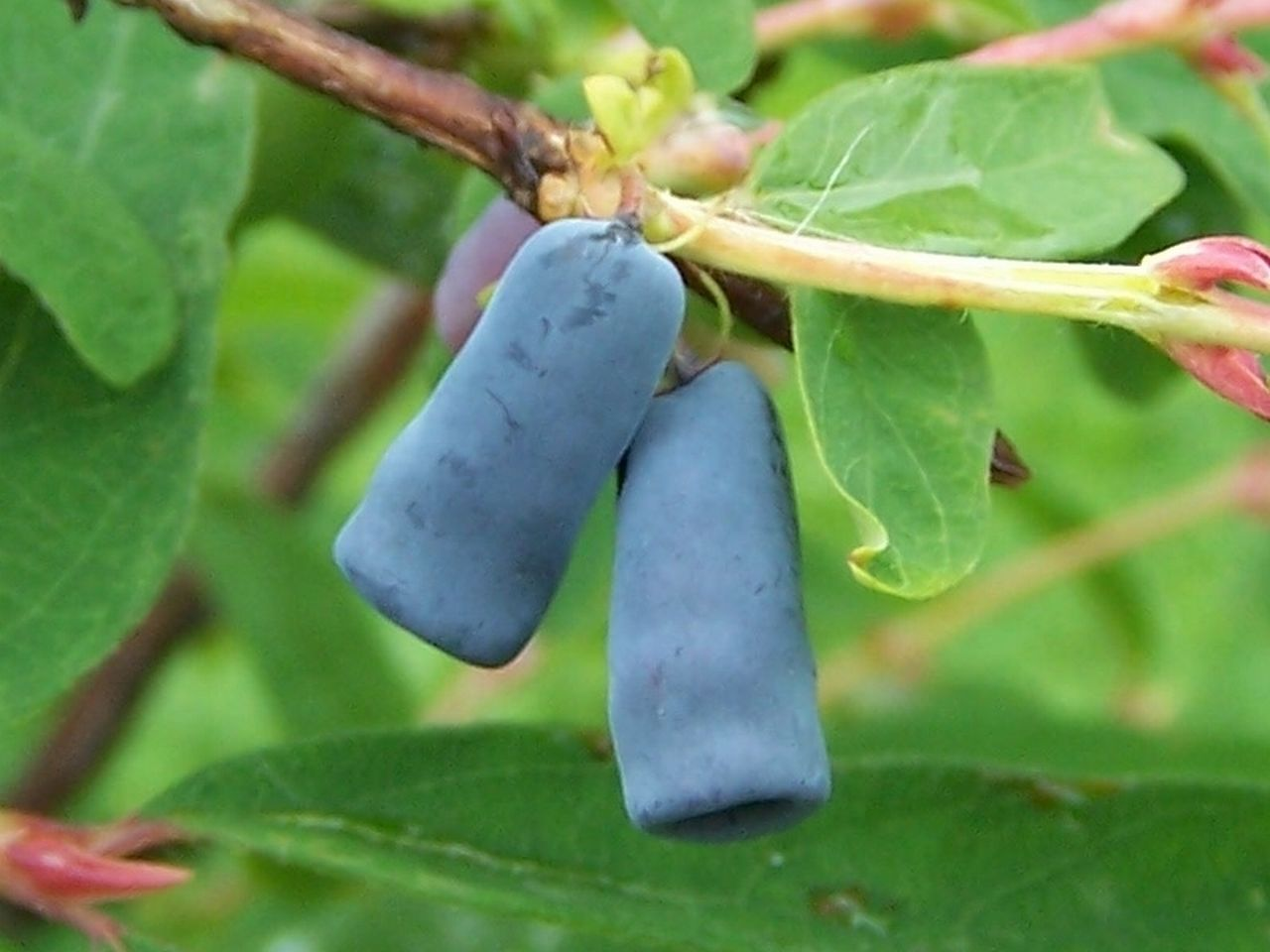

Scientific classification
- Kingdom: Plantae
- Clade: Tracheophytes
- Clade: Angiosperms
- Clade: Eudicots
- Clade: Asterids
- Order: Dipsacales
- Family: Caprifoliaceae
- Genus: Lonicera
- Species: L. caerulea

Binomial name
- Lonicera caerulea L.

Synonyms
- Caprifolium caeruleum (L.) Lam.; Euchylia caerulea (L.) Dulac; Isika coerulea (L.) Medik.; Xylosteon caeruleum (L.) Dum.Cours.

= Lonicera caerulea =

Honeysuckle plant

Lonicera caerulea, commonly known as honeyberry or by various honeysuckle names, is a non-climbing honeysuckle native throughout the cool temperate Northern Hemisphere regions of North America, Europe, and Asia.

The plant or its fruit has also come to be called haskap, derived from its name in the language of the native Ainu people of Hokkaido, Japan.

== Description ==
Haskap is a deciduous shrub growing to 1.5–2 m (4 ft 11 in – 6 ft 7 in) tall. The leaves are opposite, oval, 3–8 cm (1.2–3.1 in) long and 1–3 cm (0.39–1.18 in) broad, greyish green, with a slightly waxy texture. The flowers are yellowish-white, 12–16 mm long, with five equal lobes; they are produced in pairs on the shoots. The fruit is an edible, blue berry, somewhat cylindrical in shape weighing 1.3 to 2.2 grams (0.046 to 0.078 oz), and about 1 cm (0.39 in) in diameter.

The plant is winter-hardy and can tolerate temperatures below −47 °C (−53 °F). Its flowers are frost-tolerant. Fruits mature early and are high in vitamin C.

Haskap cultivars can survive a large range of soil acidity from 3.9-7.7 (optimum 5.5-6.5), requiring high organic matter, well drained soils, and plentiful sunlight for optimum productivity. Lonicera caerulea plants are more tolerant of wet conditions than most fruit species. Chromosome count is 2n = 18.

== Distribution and habitat ==
The species is circumpolar, primarily found in or near wetlands of boreal forests in heavy peat soils of North America, Europe, and Asia. It also can be found in high-calcium soils, in mountains, and along the coasts of northeastern Asia and northwestern North America.

Different varieties are distributed across central and northern Canada, northern United States, northern and eastern Europe, Siberia, middle Asia, and northeastern China.

== Classification ==
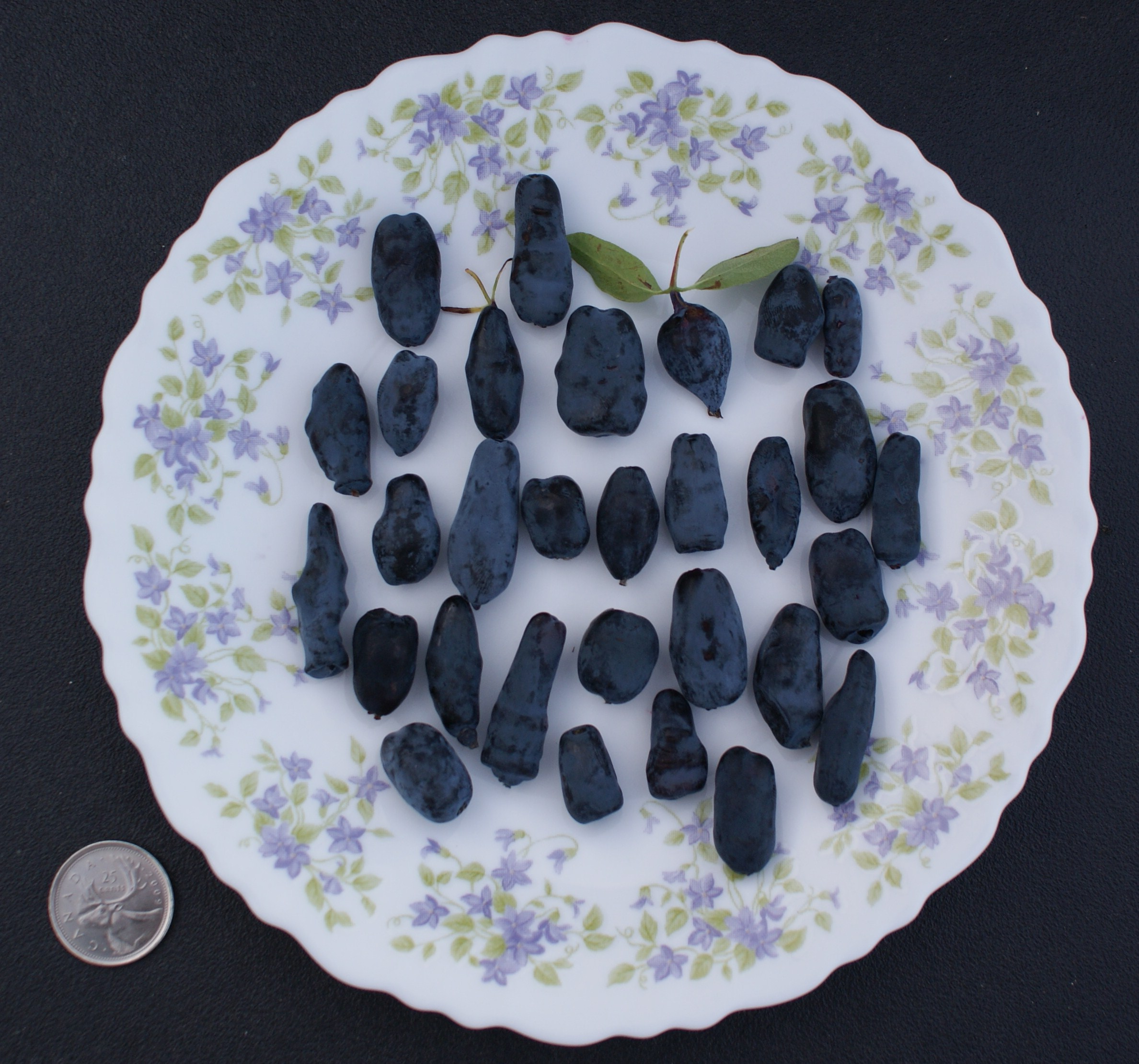
Haskap berry diversity

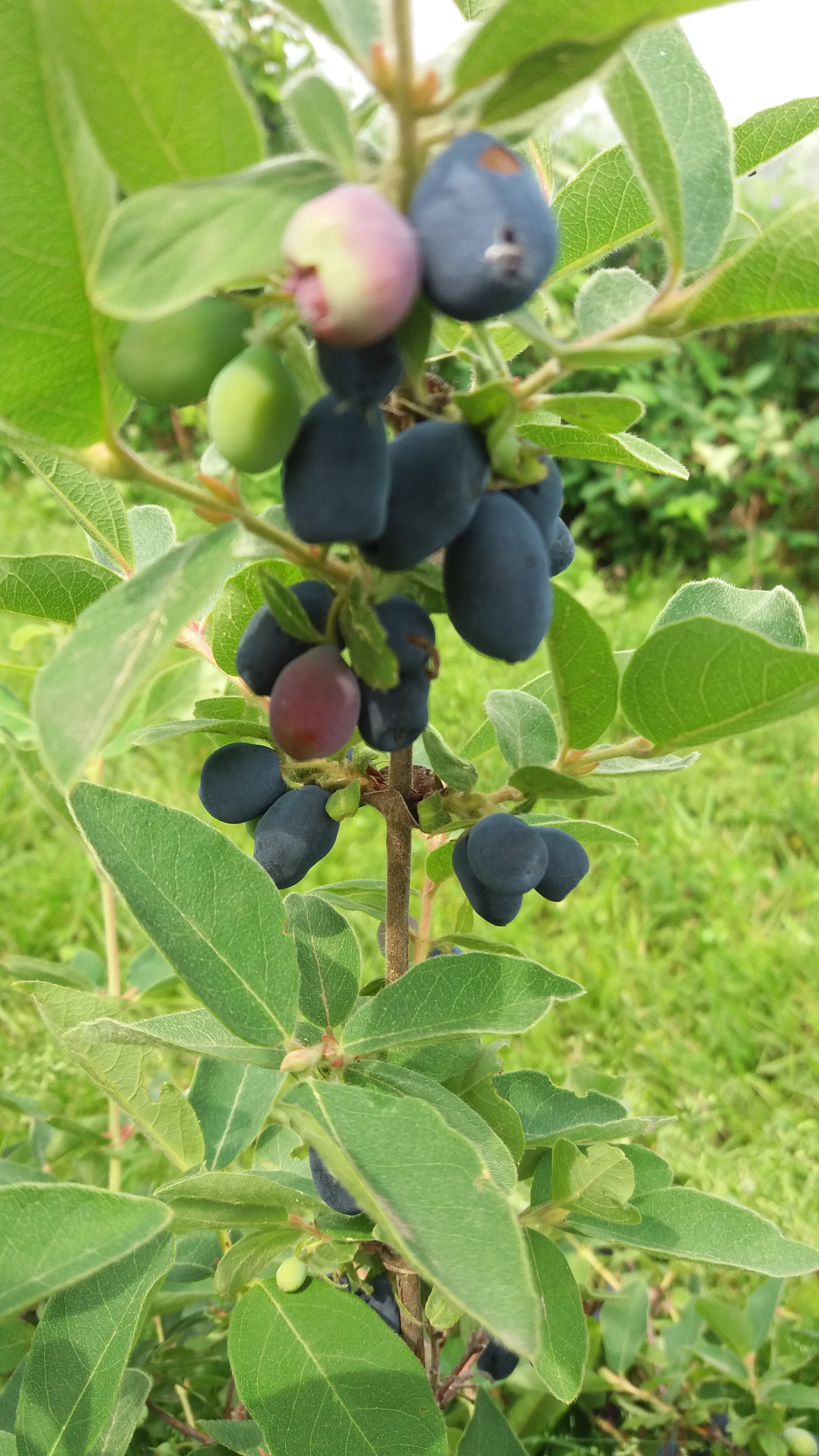
Haskap berries and leaves

The classification within the species is not settled. One classification uses nine botanical varieties:

- Lonicera caerulea var. altaica. Northern Asia.
- Lonicera caerulea var. caerulea. Europe.
- Lonicera caerulea var. cauriana. Western North America.
- Lonicera caerulea var. dependens. Central Asia.
- Lonicera caerulea var. edulis, synonym: L. edulis. Eastern Asia.
- Lonicera caerulea var. emphyllocalyx (also known as haskap). Eastern Asia.
- Lonicera caerulea var. kamtschatica. Northeastern Asia.
- Lonicera caerulea var. pallasii. Northern Asia, northeastern Europe.
- Lonicera caerulea var. villosa. Eastern North America.

=== Cultivated varieties ===
Improved cultivars include:

- 'Aurora'
- 'Boreal Beauty'
- 'Boreal Beast'
- 'Boreal Blizzard'
- 'Honeybee'
- 'Wojtek'
- 'Berry Blue'
- 'Indigo Gem'
- 'Indigo Treat'
- 'Indigo Yum'
- 'Tundra'
- 'Borealis'
- 'Atlaj'
- 'Nimfa'
- 'Polar Jewel'
- 'Sinoglaska'

According to research at the University of Saskatchewan, each variety can be distinguished by the size of berries, taste, and bush dimensions.

=== Common names ===
Lonicera caerulea is known by several common names:

- Haskap: name of the Ainu language in northern Japan
- Blue honeysuckle: descriptive translation from Russian origin
- Honeyberry: common in North America
- Swamp fly honeysuckle: coined by botanists who found it growing wild in swampy areas of Canada

== Cultivation ==
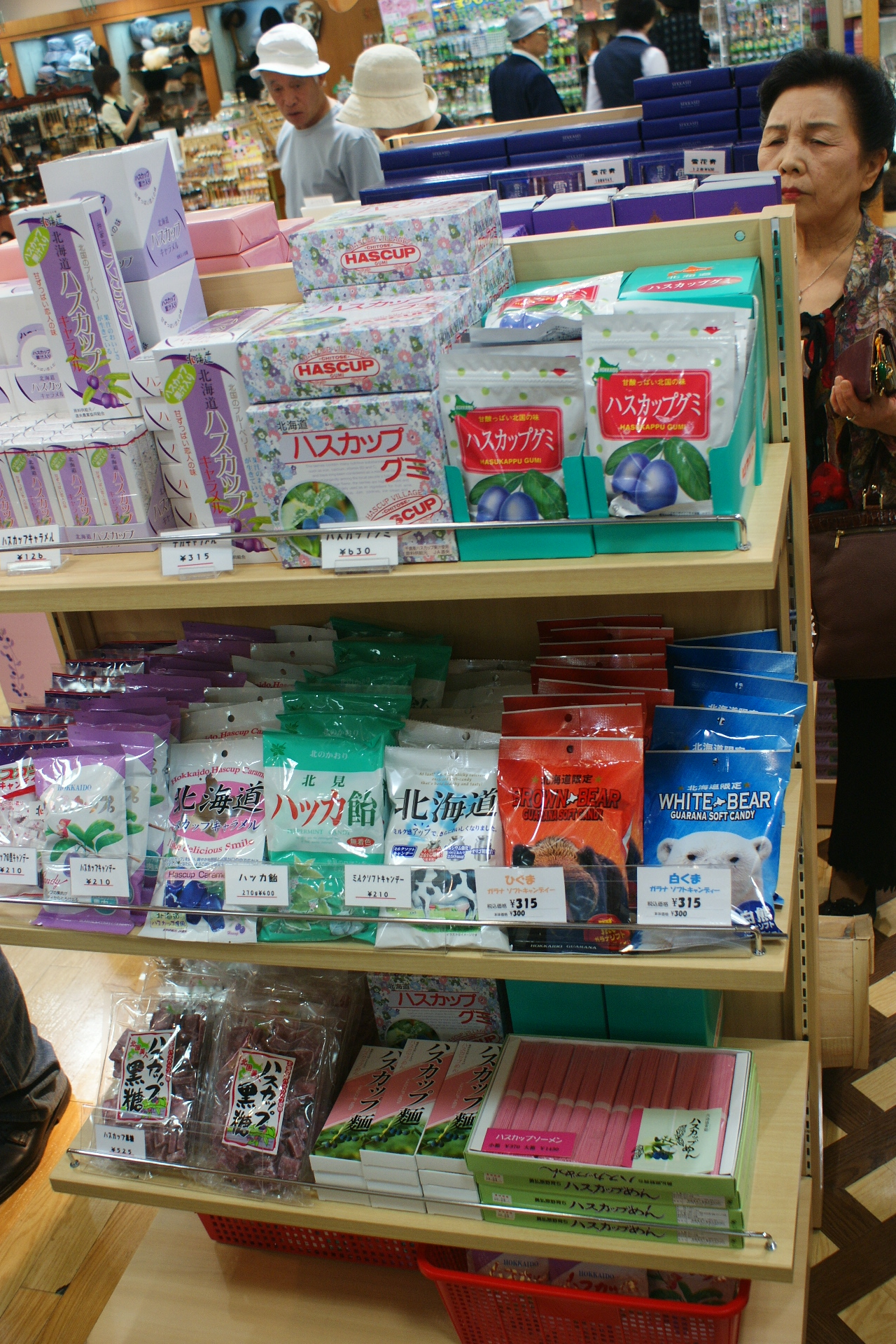
Haskap products on retail display in a Japanese market

The indigenous peoples of eastern Russia, northern Japan, and northern China have long harvested the wild berries, but cultivation efforts are relatively recent. Research into commercial cultivation improved in Hokkaido, Japan in the 1970s. The plant is mostly unknown in the Western world, even though some varieties grow in Canada and northern United States. Haskap variety edulis has been used frequently in breeding efforts, but other varieties have been bred with it to increase productivity and flavor. In several haskap breeding programs, the variety emphyllocalyx has been the dominant one used. In recent years, a new programme has aimed at growing honeyberries commercially in Scotland (with a similar climate to Northern Japan) at farms in Duns, Angus, Tayside, Perth and Fife.

=== Disease ===
This plant is not affected by many pests and diseases. Powdery mildew is one disease documented to affect Lonicera caerulea, usually after fruit maturity in mid– to late summer. When the plant is affected, it is common for the leaves to turn white, with brown patches eventually developing.

== Harvest and uses ==
Honeysuckle is harvested in late spring or early summer two weeks before strawberries for Russian type varieties, with Japanese types ripening at a similar time to strawberries. The berries are ready to harvest when the inner layer is dark purple or blue. The outer layer is dark blue and looks ripened, but the inner layer may be green with a sour flavor. Two compatible varieties are needed for cross pollination and fruit set. In North America, most Russian varieties are adapted to hardiness zones 1 to 4. The plants may take three or four years to produce an abundant harvest. Average production on a good bush is about 3 kilograms (6.6 lb), and bushes can maintain productivity for 30 years.

Honeysuckle can be used in various processed products, such as pastries, jams, juice, ice cream, yogurt, sauces, candies and a wine similar in color and flavor to red grape or cherry wine.

== Phytochemicals ==
As a blue pigmented fruit, Lonicera caerulea contains polyphenol compounds, including cyanidin 3-glucoside, cyanidin 3-rutinoside, peonidin 3-glucoside, proanthocyanidins and organic acids, including citric acid.

== Traditional medicine ==
Over centuries in East Asian countries, Lonicera caerulea has been used for supposed therapeutic applications in traditional medicine.
