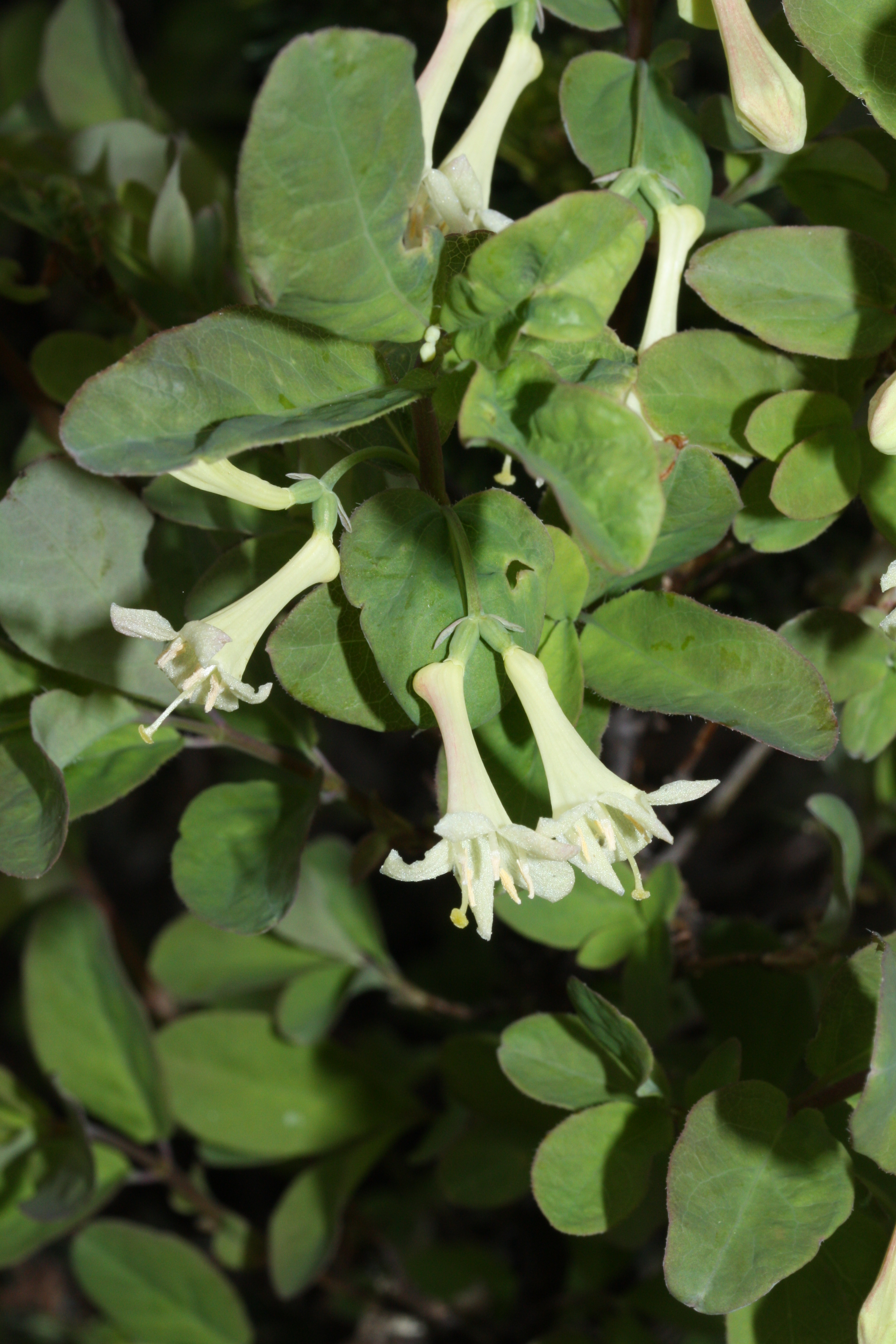

Conservation status
- Secure (NatureServe)

Scientific classification
- Kingdom: Plantae
- Clade: Tracheophytes
- Clade: Angiosperms
- Clade: Eudicots
- Clade: Asterids
- Order: Dipsacales
- Family: Caprifoliaceae
- Genus: Lonicera
- Species: L. utahensis

Binomial name
- Lonicera utahensis S.Watson

= Lonicera utahensis =

Species of honeysuckle

Lonicera utahensis is a species of flowering plant in the honeysuckle family known by the common names Utah honeysuckle, red twinberry, and fly honeysuckle. It is native to western North America.

== Description ==
This honeysuckle is a deciduous shrub growing 1 to 2 metres (3 1/2 to 6 1/2 ft) tall. It has slender, spreading branches and it may take a clumpy form. The leaves are oval or oblong in shape and measure up to 8 centimetres (3 1/4 in) long by 4 wide. The undersides are hairless or have stiff hairs.

Pairs of flowers are borne on peduncles up to 15 cm (6 in) long. The flowers have yellow to yellowish-white petals up to 1 cm long. The fruit is a red berry almost 1 cm wide. The seeds are dispersed by animals that eat the fruit, including birds and bears.

== Distribution and habitat ==
The plant is native to western North America from British Columbia, Washington, and Oregon, east to Alberta and Montana and south through the Rocky Mountains to Arizona and New Mexico.

It occurs in the understory of mature forests, such as those composed of grand fir and Rocky Mountain maple. It is often a climax species. It may be a codominant plant in subalpine fir-common beargrass plant communities. It can be found at 300–3,400 m (980–11,150 ft) in elevation, but is most common at 1,200–2,400 m (3,900–7,900 ft). Other associated plants include white spiraea, ninebark, Scouler willow, Sitka alder, thinleaf huckleberry, pinegrass, queencup beadlily, and sweetscented bedstraw.

== Uses ==
This plant can be used as an ornamental and in revegetation efforts. The berry is considered edible.
