= Peshtigo River State Forest =

State park in Marinette and Oconto counties, Wisconsin

Governor Earl Peshtigo River State Forest
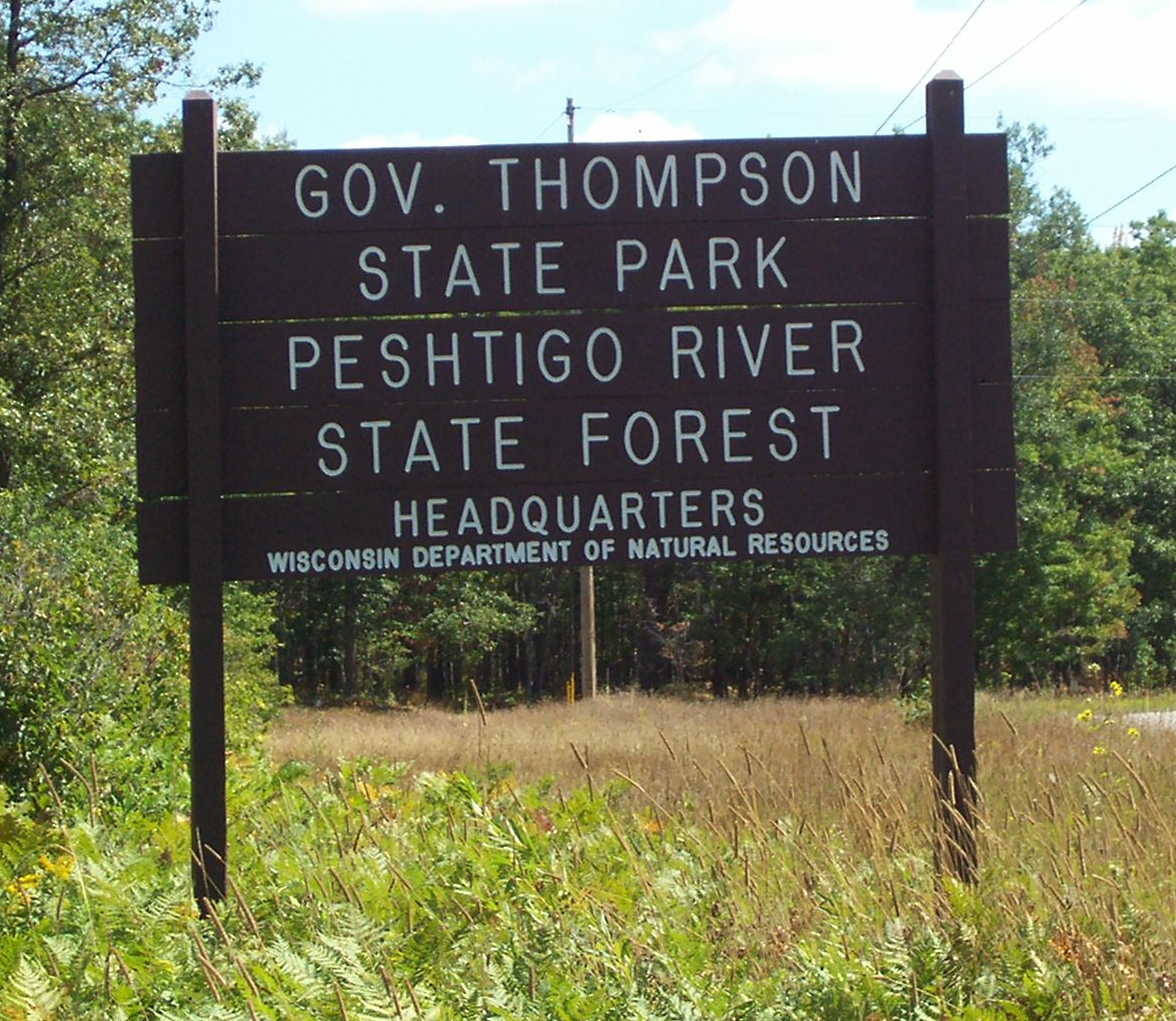
- Headquarters sign

- Location within Wisconsin Location within the United States
- Interactive map of Governor Earl Peshtigo River; State Forest
- Location: Marinette and Oconto counties, Wisconsin, United States
- Coordinates: 45°17′19″N 88°11′24″W
- Area: 12,400 acres (5,000 ha)
- Established: 2001
- Named for: Anthony S. Earl
- Visitors: 503,686 (in 2024)
- Administrator: Wisconsin Department of Natural Resources
- Website: Official website
- Wisconsin State Forests

Governor Earl Peshtigo River State Forest is a 12,400-acre (5,000 ha) Wisconsin state forest in Marinette and Oconto counties. The forest is on the Peshtigo River next to Governor Thompson State Park. Peshtigo River State Forest includes 25 miles of river, 3,200 acres (1,300 ha) acres of water and 9,200 acres (3,700 ha) acres of forest. It allows the gathering and harvesting of forest products, including firewood, holiday trees/boughs, and other woody vegetation, for personal use. It was Wisconsin's tenth most popular state park/state forest unit in 2024.
