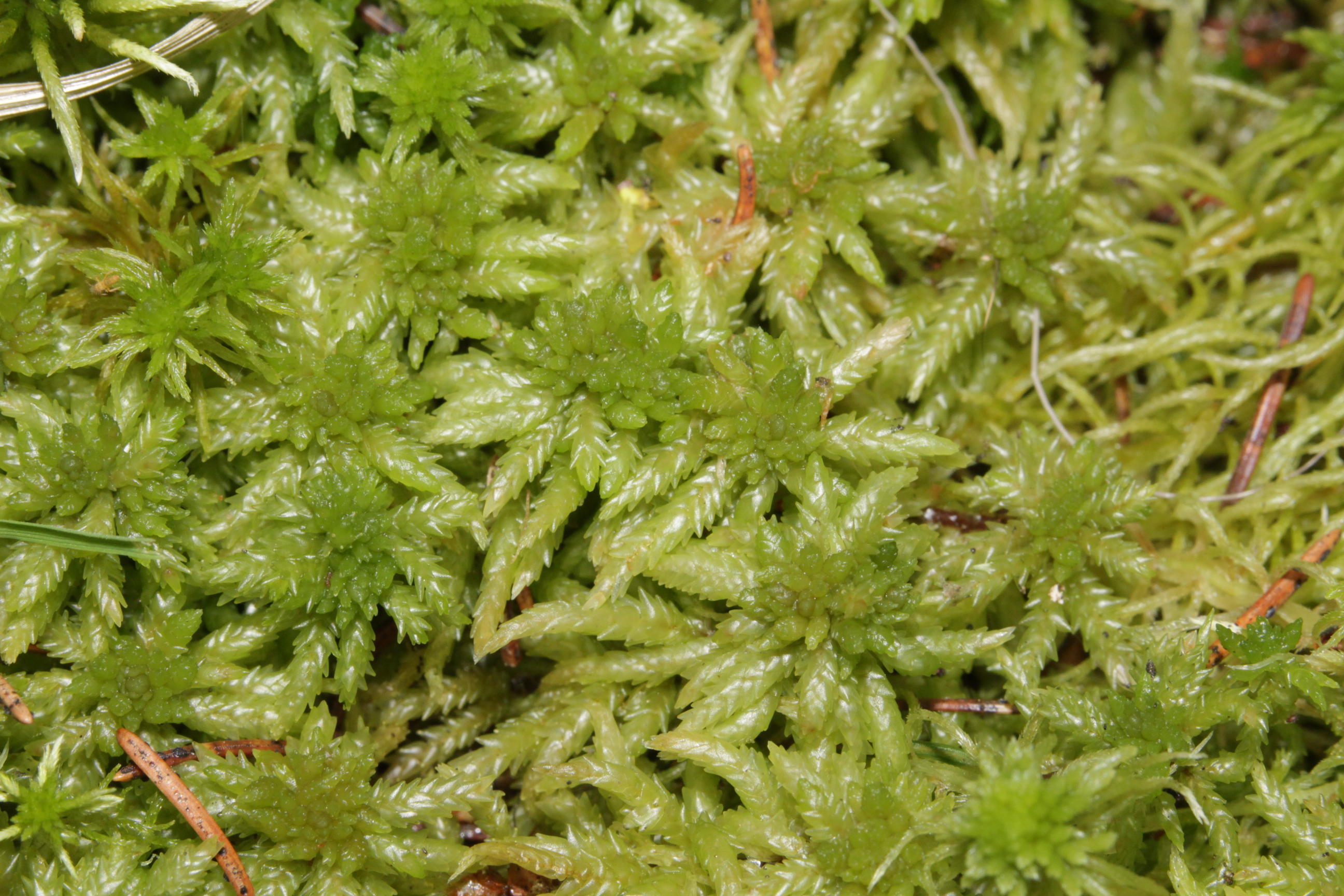

Scientific classification
- Kingdom: Plantae
- Division: Bryophyta
- Class: Sphagnopsida
- Order: Sphagnales
- Family: Sphagnaceae
- Genus: Sphagnum
- Species: S. centrale

Binomial name
- Sphagnum centrale C.E.O.Jensen

= Sphagnum centrale =

Species of moss

Sphagnum centrale is a species of moss belonging to the family Sphagnaceae.

It has cosmopolitan distribution. It is often found in cedar swamps and similar environs. It has a pale green color common to all the Sphagnum subgenus mosses but, unlike other common members of the subgenus like Sphagnum magellanicum, it will never be red and rarely brown.
