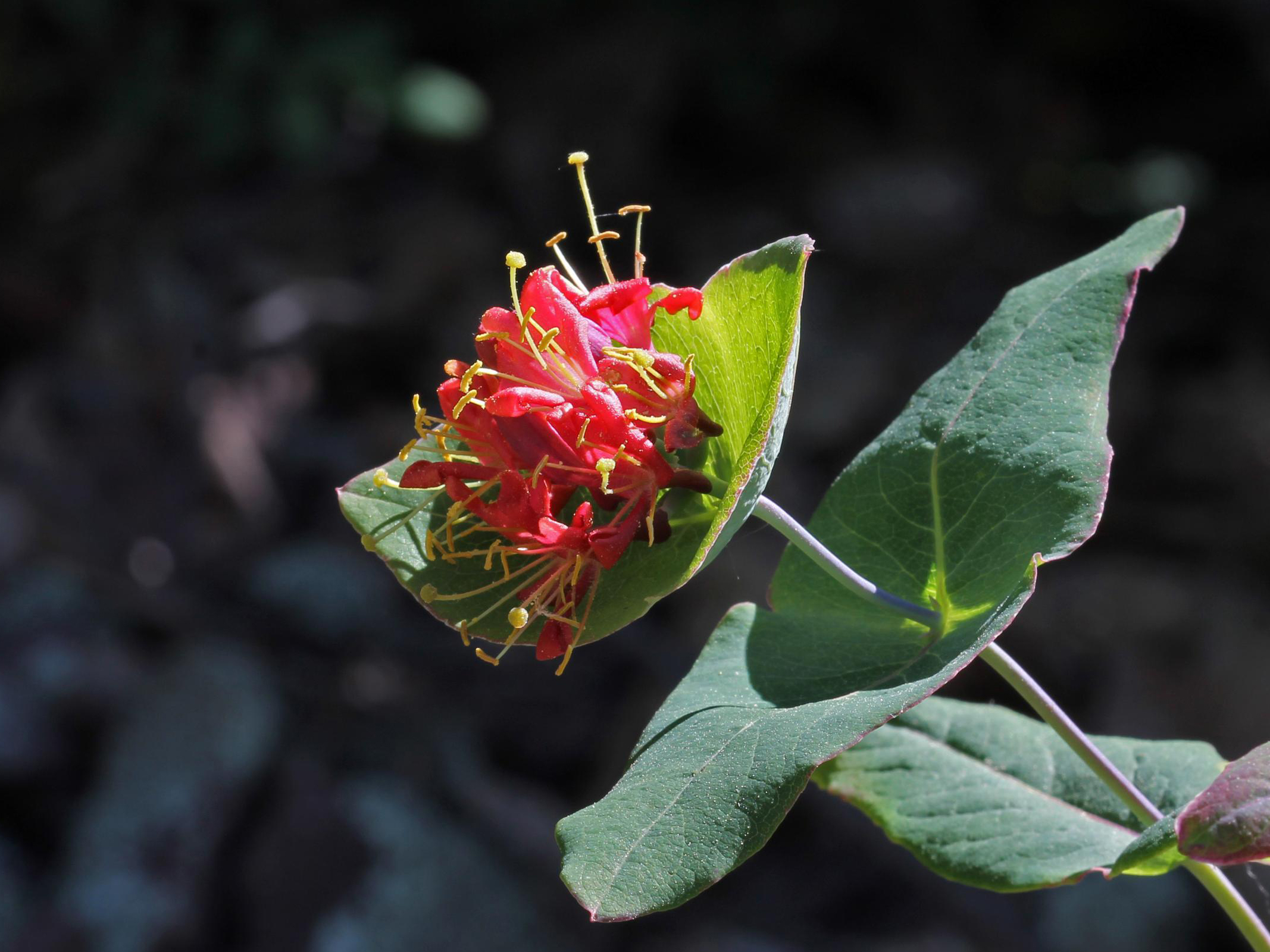

Scientific classification
- Kingdom: Plantae
- Clade: Tracheophytes
- Clade: Angiosperms
- Clade: Eudicots
- Clade: Asterids
- Order: Dipsacales
- Family: Caprifoliaceae
- Genus: Lonicera
- Species: L. dioica

Binomial name
- Lonicera dioica L.

Synonyms
- Lonicera dioica var. glaucescens (Rydb.) Butters; Lonicera hirsuta var. glaucescens Rydb.

= Lonicera dioica =

Species of honeysuckle

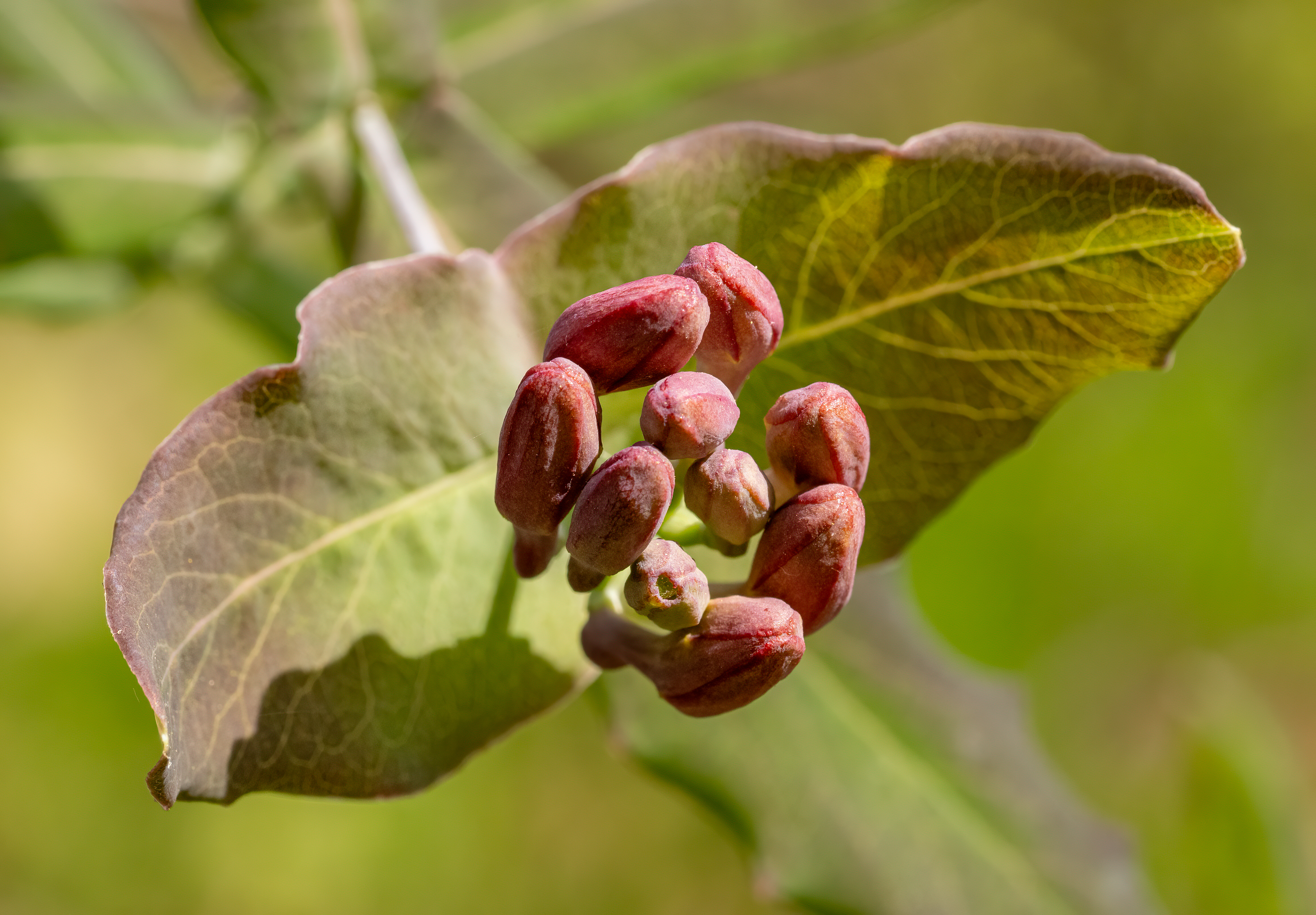
L. dioica buds

Lonicera dioica (limber honeysuckle, glaucous honeysuckle) is a vine in the honeysuckle family native to Canada and the eastern and central United States. Lonicera dioica comprises four variations: var. dasygyna, var. dioica, var. douglasii, and var. orientalis.
