= Governor Thompson State Park =

State park in Marinette County, Wisconsin

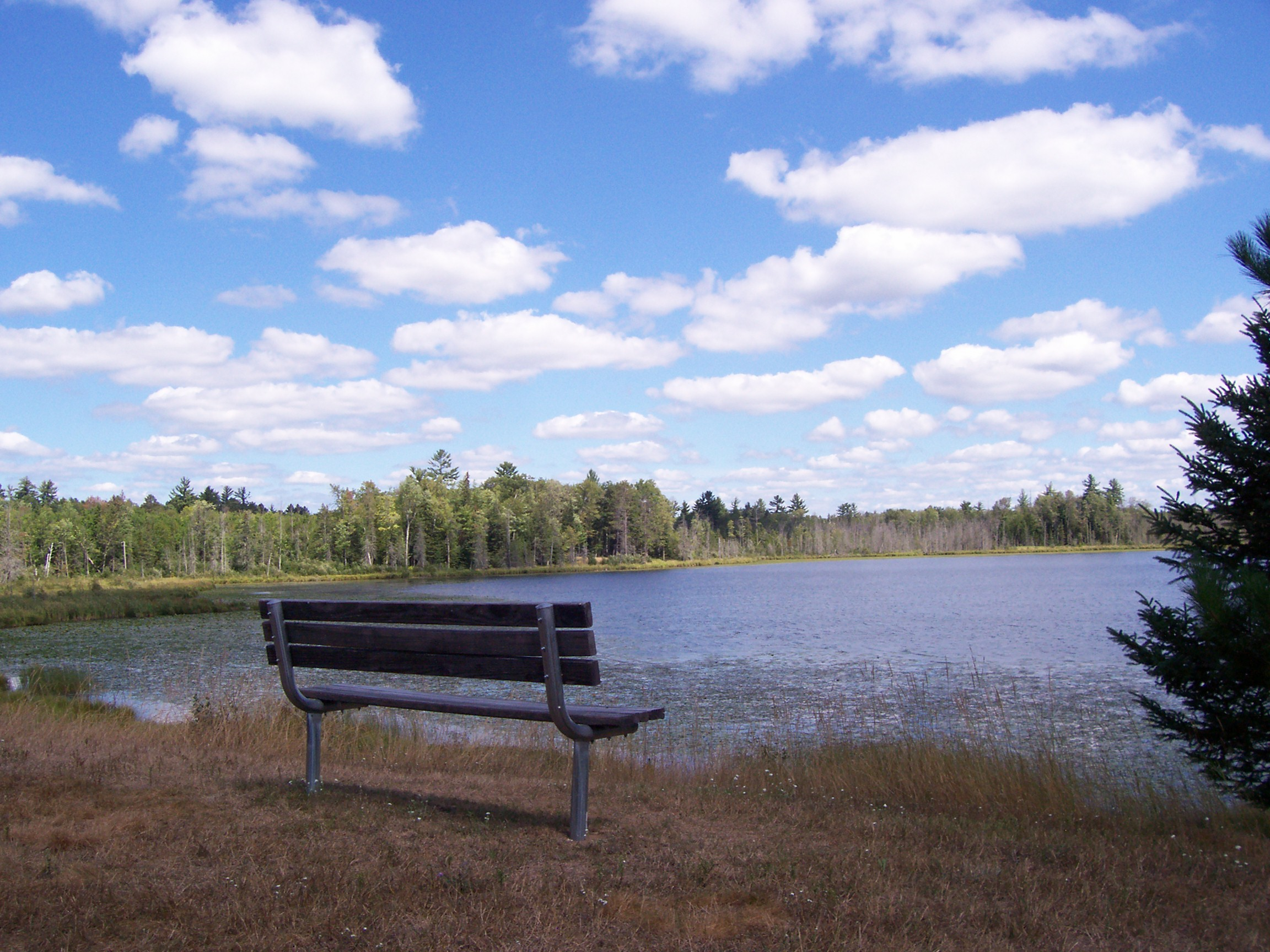
- Woods Lake

- Location within Wisconsin Location within the United States
- Interactive map of Governor Thompson State Park
- Location: Marinette County, Wisconsin, United States
- Coordinates: 45°20′4″N 88°14′52″W
- Area: 2,800 acres (1,100 ha)
- Elevation: 981 ft (299 m)
- Established: 2000
- Administrator: Wisconsin Department of Natural Resources
- Named for: Tommy Thompson
- Website: Official website
- Wisconsin State Parks

Governor Thompson State Park is a 2,800-acre (1,133 ha) state park in Wisconsin, United States, 15 miles (24 km) northwest of Crivitz. The park contains 6.5 miles (10.5 km) of shoreline on the Caldron Falls Reservoir, part of the Peshtigo River, and 5,300 feet (1,600 m) of shoreline on two kettles, Woods Lake and Huber Lake. Adjacent lands are part of the Peshtigo River State Forest.

== History ==
The park was created in 2000, the centennial year of the Wisconsin state park system, and named after then-Governor Tommy Thompson. The main parcel creating the park is the former 1,987-acre (804 ha) Paust Woods Lake Resort and about 200 acres (0.81 km^{2}) of wild-looking lakefront bought from Wisconsin Public Service Corporation on Caldron Falls Reservoir. The park opened in 2005.

== Recreational features ==
The park has 16 miles (26 km) of hiking trails, boat landing on the Caldron Falls Flowage, picnic area along the west shore of Woods Lake, swimming beach, and campgrounds. A park master plan calls for indoor and outdoor group campgrounds, playground and amphitheater.
