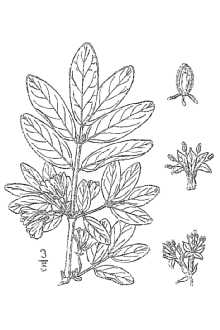

Conservation status
- Secure (NatureServe)

Scientific classification
- Kingdom: Plantae
- Clade: Tracheophytes
- Clade: Angiosperms
- Clade: Eudicots
- Clade: Asterids
- Order: Dipsacales
- Family: Caprifoliaceae
- Genus: Lonicera
- Species: L. villosa

Binomial name
- Lonicera villosa (Michx.) Schult.
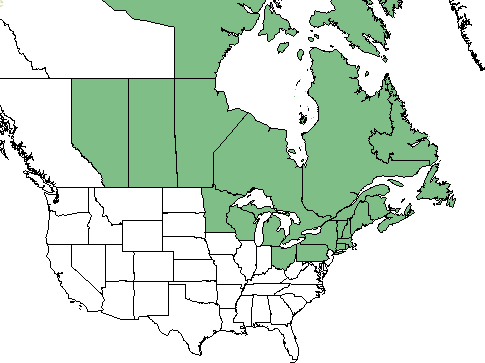
- Lonicera villosa range

= Lonicera villosa =

Species of honeysuckle

Lonicera villosa, also known as mountain fly honeysuckle, is a species of honeysuckle native to North America.

== Growth ==
Lonicera villosa is a small bush, ranging from 1 to 5 feet in height. The elongated white flowers grow in clusters, while its blue berries grow in pairs.

== Distribution ==
Lonicera villosa occurs across the Northern and Northeastern United States, as well as Central, Eastern, and Northern Canada.

== Uses ==
The berries of Lonicera villosa are edible and sometimes mistaken for blueberries.
