= Tension zone =

A tension zone is a transitional zone between two distinctive zones, the zones may be influenced by climatic factors, and geological variation. creating a floristic tension zone. A marine tension zone may be affected by variables such as depth, climate or salinity. In a tension zone there is the increased probability of hybridization between species of the separate zones and thus the tension zone may also be a hybrid zone.

Historically tension zones were entirely natural in origin, however human activity has altered the tension zones in a variety of areas all over the world.
