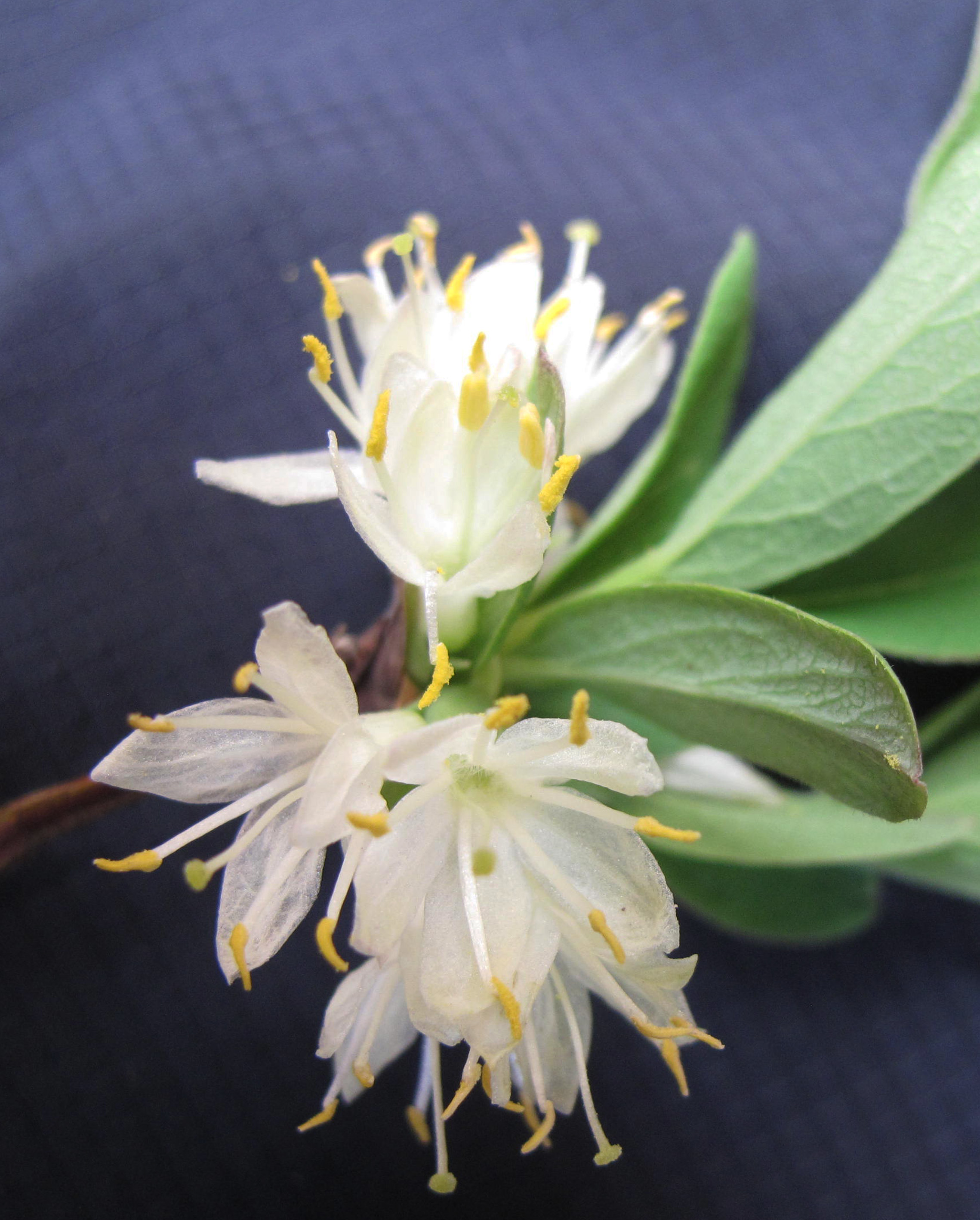

Conservation status
- Least Concern (IUCN 3.1)

Scientific classification
- Kingdom: Plantae
- Clade: Embryophytes
- Clade: Tracheophytes
- Clade: Spermatophytes
- Clade: Angiosperms
- Clade: Eudicots
- Clade: Asterids
- Order: Dipsacales
- Family: Caprifoliaceae
- Genus: Lonicera
- Species: L. oblongifolia

Binomial name
- Lonicera oblongifolia Hook.

= Lonicera oblongifolia =

Species of honeysuckle

Lonicera oblongifolia, also known as the swamp honeysuckle and swamp fly honeysuckle is a species of flowering plant belonging to the family Caprifoliaceae.

Its native range is the US and Canada.
