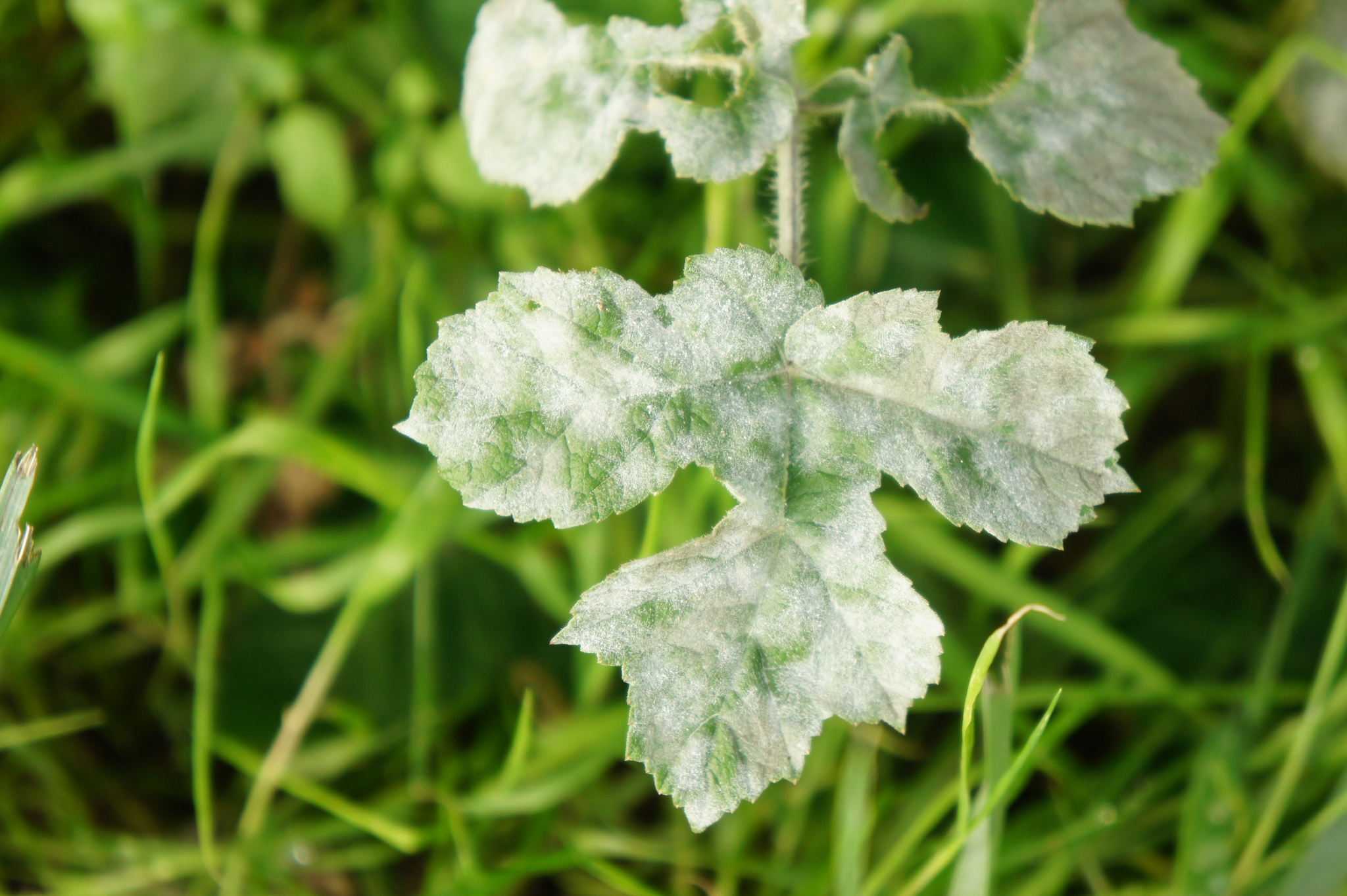
- Erysiphe heraclei on Heracleum sphondylium in the UK

Scientific classification
- Kingdom: Fungi
- Division: Ascomycota
- Class: Leotiomycetes
- Order: Helotiales
- Family: Erysiphaceae
- Genus: Erysiphe
- Species: E. heraclei

Binomial name
- Erysiphe heraclei DC., 1815

Synonyms
- List: Alphitomorpha heraclei (DC.) Wallr., 1819; Alphitomorpha communis β umbelliferarum Wallr., 1819; Erysiphe communis var. umbelliferarum (Wallr.) Link, 1824; Erysiphe communis i. umbelliferarum (Wallr.) Fr., 1829; Ischnochaeta heraclei (DC.) Sawada, 1951; Erysiphe pisi var. heraclei (DC.) Ialongo, 1992; Erysiphe scandicis DC., 1815; Erysiphe communis i. umbelliferarum (Wallr.) Fr., 1829; Erysiphe umbelliferarum f. scandicis (DC.) Jacz., 1927; Erysiphe pycnopus Mart., 1817; Erysiphe umbelliferarum de Bary, 1870; Erysiphe martii f. pimpinellae-magnae Sacc., 1876; Erysiphe communis f. umbelliferarum Jacz., 1896; Erysiphe umbelliferarum f. pastinaceae Hammarl., 1925; Erysiphe umbelliferarum f. sii Hammarl., 1925; Erysiphe umbelliferarum f. torilidis Hammarl., 1925; Erysiphe umbelliferarum f. aegopodii Jacz., 1927; Erysiphe umbelliferarum f. aethusae Jacz., 1927; Erysiphe umbelliferarum f. anethi Jacz., 1927; Erysiphe umbelliferarum f. angelicae Jacz., 1927; Erysiphe umbelliferarum f. anthrisci Jacz., 1927; Erysiphe umbelliferarum f. apii Jacz., 1927; Erysiphe umbelliferarum f. carvi Jacz., 1927; Erysiphe umbelliferarum f. caucalidis Jacz., 1927; Erysiphe umbelliferarum f. chaerophylii Jacz., 1927; Erysiphe umbelliferarum f. cicutae Jacz., 1927; Erysiphe umbelliferarum f. conii Jacz., 1927; Erysiphe umbelliferarum f. dauci Jacz., 1927; Erysiphe umbelliferarum f. eryngii Jacz., 1927; Erysiphe umbelliferarum f. falcariae Jacz., 1927; Erysiphe umbelliferarum f. gorlenkinianthes Jacz., 1927; Erysiphe umbelliferarum f. hippomarathri Jacz., 1927; Erysiphe umbelliferarum f. ligustici Jacz., 1927; Erysiphe umbelliferarum f. myrrhidis Jacz., 1927; Erysiphe umbelliferarum f. orlayae Jacz., 1927; Erysiphe umbelliferarum f. peucedani Jacz., 1927; Erysiphe umbelliferarum f. phloidicarpi Jacz., 1927; Erysiphe umbelliferarum f. physospremi Jacz., 1927; Erysiphe umbelliferarum f. pimpinellae Jacz., 1927; Erysiphe umbelliferarum f. pleurospremi Jacz., 1927; Erysiphe umbelliferarum f. selini Jacz., 1927; Erysiphe umbelliferarum f. seseli Jacz., 1927; Erysiphe umbelliferarum f. silae Jacz., 1927; Erysiphe umbelliferarum f. sileris Jacz., 1927; Erysiphe umbelliferarum f. smyrnii Jacz., 1927; Erysiphe umbelliferarum f. thapsiae Jacz., 1927; Erysiphe umbelliferarum f. tordylii Jacz., 1927; Erysiphe umbelliferarum f. aulacospremi Vasyagina, 1961; Erysiphe umbelliferarum f. cachrydis Vasyagina, 1961; Erysiphe umbelliferarum f. ferulae Golovin ex Vasyagina, 1961; Erysiphe umbelliferarum f. conioselini Shvarcman, 1961; Oidium erysiphoides f. umbelliferarum Sacc., 1886; Oidium coriandri Hosag., Vijay., Udaiyan & Manian, 1992

= Erysiphe heraclei =

Species of fungus

Erysiphe heraclei is a species of powdery mildew in the family Erysiphaceae. It is found across the world, where it infects members of the family Apiaceae (umbellifers). It has also been recorded on Billardiera in Australia.

== Description ==
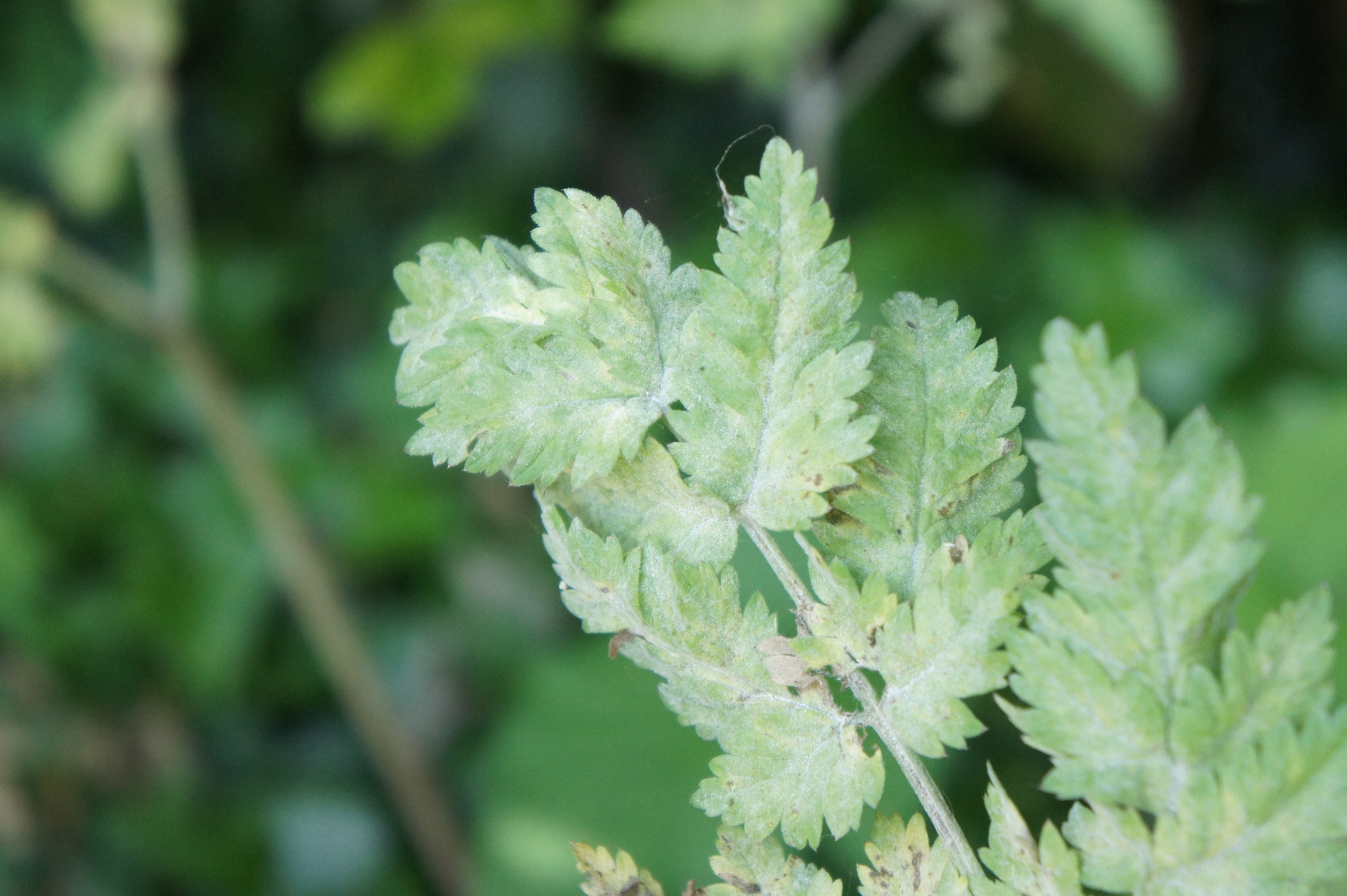
Erysiphe heraclei infects various umbellifers, such as Anthriscus.

The fungus forms mycelium on both sides of the leaves of its hosts, as well as on stems and inflorescences. As with most Erysiphaceae, Erysiphe heraclei is fairly host-specific, infecting almost solely plants in the family Apiaceae (with the exception of one genus in the Pittosporaceae). However, it infects a comparatively large range of genera for a powdery mildew species, which could suggest that it is in fact a complex of multiple cryptic species. Erysiphe heraclei can be found in any habitats where its host species occur, both wild and in urban and suburban gardens and parks.

Its reported host range includes Aegopodium, Aethusa, Ammi, Anethum, Angelica, Anthriscus, Apium, Arracacia, Astrodaucus, Athamantha, Aulacospermum, Berula, Bifora, Bowlesia, Bunium, Bupleurum, Cachrys, Carum, Caucalis, Centella, Chaerophyllum, Chaetosciadium, Cicuta, Cnidium, Conioselinum, Conium, Coriandrum, Cuminum, Daucus, Drusa, Dystaenia, Eryngium, Falcaria, Ferula, Foeniculum, Heracleum, Laser, Laserpitium, Levisticum, Ligusticum, Myrrhis, Oenanthe, Orlaya, Ostericum, Osmorhiza, Pastinaca, Petroselinum, Peucedanum, Phlojodicarpus, Physospermum, Pimpinella, Pleurospermum, Peucedanum, Rhabdosciadium, Ridolfia, Saposhnikovia, Scaligeria, Scandix, Schrenkia, Selinum, Seseli, Silaum, Siler, Sium, Smyrnium, Sphallerocarpus, Thapsia, Todaroa, Tordylium, Torilis, Trachymene, Trinia, Turgenia and Zizia in the Apiaceae and Billardiera in the Pittosporaceae. Some of these species also host other species of powdery mildew.

== Taxonomy ==
Erysiphe heraclei was formally described by de Candolle in 1815. The lectotype specimen was collected on Heracleum sphondylium. The specific epithet derives from the type host genus. Bradshaw et al. (2024) suggested that Erysiphe betae may be synonymous with Erysiphe heraclei.

== Pathology ==
Erysiphe heraclei affects carrots, a widely-grown vegetable, and consequently research has been conducted into preventing or reducing the severity of infection on this host. Currently, most conventional treatments involve the application of fungicides. The most successful fungicides are said to be sulphur and azoxystrobin. Work has also been conducted to investigate creating and breeding infection-resistant cultivars of carrots.

== Micromorphology ==
=== Description ===
The mycelium is hypophyllous (found on leaf undersides) and sometimes covers the entire surface. The hyphal appressoria are lobed and occur both solitarily and in opposite pairs. Conidophores arise from the top of their mother cell. They have cylindrical, straight foot cells. The conidiophores produce single conidia. Conidia are cylindrical; germ tubes arise an end and are variable in length. Conidia appressoria are vary variable and can have up to nine lobes. The chasmothecia (fruiting bodies) have a variable number of appendages in the lower half, which are myceloid and simple or irregularly branched. Appendages are said to often be interwoven with the mycelium. Appendages are pigmented yellowish-brown when mature. The peridium of the chasmothecia has inconspicuous cells of irregular shape. Erysiphe heraclei typically has three to five spores per ascus which are large, ellipsoid-ovoid and colourless. The asci are typically clavate or saccate and are sessile or short-stalked.

=== Measurements ===
Hyphal cells measure 40–90 × (2.5–)4–6(–10) μm. Conidiophores are up to 160 μm long, with foot cells that measure 20–70(–90) × 8–10(–12) μm. Conidia are 25–45(–55) × 12–20(–23) μm. The chasmothecia are 80–140(–170) μm in diameter with peridium cells 8–20(–25) μm in diameter. Appendages are (0.25–)0.5–1.5(–2)× the diameter of the chasmothecia and (3–)4–8(–10) μm wide. Asci number (2–)3–7(–10) and are 40–85(–90) × 30–45(–65) μm with ascospores measuring (16–)18–30(–34) × 10–18(–22) μm.
