= Parsley (disambiguation) =

Parsley or garden parsley most often refers to the widely cultivated culinary herb Petroselinum crispum

Parsley or wild parsley may also refer to:

== Plants ==
- Apiaceae, the parsley family:
  - under Anthriscus, the chervil genus:
    - Anthriscus cerefolium (chervil), an herb also known as "French parsley" or "beaked parsley"
    - Anthriscus sylvestris, sometimes known as "cow parsley" or "wild beaked parsley"
  - under Petroselinum, the parsley genus:
    - Petroselinum segetum, also known as "corn parsley", the closest relative of garden parsley
  - Musineon, the wild parsley genus
  - in other genera:
    - Aethusa cynapium, "fool's parsley", also known as "poison parsley"
    - Heracleum mantegazzianum, sometimes known as "giant cow parsley"
    - Orlaya grandiflora, sometimes known as "French cow parsley"
    - Peucedanum palustre, sometimes known as "milk parsley"

In other botanical families:

- Anogramma ascensionis (family Pteridaceae), also known as "Ascension Island parsley fern"
- Aphanes (family Rosaceae), the parsley-piert genus
- Crataegus marshallii (family Rosaceae), also called "parsley haw" or "parsley-leaved hawthorn"
- Cryptogramma crispa (family Pteridaceae), also known as "parsley fern"
- Wild parsley, a generic term used for many plants with leaves resembling parsley

== Other uses ==
- Parsley, West Virginia, a community in the United States
- Parsley the Lion, a British children's television character
- Parsley (name)
