= Sofya Georgiyevna Tamamshyan =

Soviet botanist (1900-1981)

- Born: 18 June 1901; Tiflis, Russian Empire
- Died: 1981 (aged 79–80); Moscow
- Known for: Taxonomy; Botany
- Scientific career
- Fields: Botany; Biology; Zoology
- Institutions: USSR Academy of Sciences
- Author abbrev. (botany): Tamamsch.

Sofya Georgiyevna Tamamshyan (1901–1981) was a Russian-Soviet botanist and plant taxonomist noted for describing 7 genera and more than 50 species, and for authoring over 120 works. The standard author abbreviation Tamamsch. is used to indicate this person as the author when citing a botanical name.

== Biography ==
In 1936, Sofya Georgievna Tamamshyan earned a PHD of biological sciences. Since 1946, Sofya Georgievna studied and worked at the Botanical Institute (BIN) of the USSR Academy of Sciences in Leningrad, was preparing her doctoral dissertation "Ancestors and descendants of the umbrella family ."

She took part in the processing of many genera for the monographs "Flora of the USSR" and "Flora of the Caucasus", as well as Flora iranica. In 1952 S.G. Tamamshyan became a junior researcher at the plant resources department of the BIN, in 1954 - a senior researcher at the plant taxonomy and geography department. For a long time, Sofia Georgievna worked at the Herbarium of the BIN and studied samples of Apiaceae and Asteraceae families.

In 1954, S. G. Tamamshyan led an expedition to the Transcaucasia to study plants. In 1969, she proposed the name "schizostratocarp" for the fruits of the Apiaceae, and "hemistratocarp" for the constituent single-seeded halves.

She helped found the Armenian Academy of Science.

In 1963, she retired from the Botanical Institute and retired, then moved to Moscow.

Sofya Georgievna has published many articles in the Botanical Journal, Soviet Botany, and Taxon. She published variants of the taxonomy of the genera Astrodaucus, Phlojodicarpus, Stenocoelium and Grammosciadium.

She was honoured in 1996, when botanists Pimenov & Kljuykov published Tamamschjanella, which is a genus of flowering plants from Europe and Central Asia, belonging to the family Apiaceae.

== Plant taxa named after S. G. Tamamshyan ==
- Tamamschjania Pimenov & Kljuykov (1981)
- Tamamschjanella Pimenov & Kljuykov (1996)
- Alcea sophiae Iljin (1949)
- Carthamus tamamschjanae Gabrieljan (1987)
- Oenanthe sophiae Schischk. (1950)
- Polygala sophiae Kem.-Nath. (1948)
- Polygala tamamschaniae V. I. Dorof. (2001)
- Pyrus tamamschianae Fed. (1952)
- Salsola tamamschjanae Iljin (1937)
- Sorbus tamamschjanae Gabrieljan (1969)

== Works ==
- Tamamschjan, Sofia (1935). "Über einige Pflanzen aus der Umgebung von Eriwán". Repertorium Novarum Specierum Regni Vegetabilis. 38 (S2): 162–171. doi:10.1002/fedr.4870382705.
- Tamamschjan, Sofia (1936). "Zur Karpobiologie derActinolema macrolema Fenzl". Repertorium Novarum Specierum Regni Vegetabilis. 39 (S1): 125–128. doi:10.1002/fedr.4870392603.
- Tamamschjan, Sofia (1936). "Über einige Polygalaceen aus dem Kaukasus". Repertorium Novarum Specierum Regni Vegetabilis. 39 (S2): 321–329. doi:10.1002/fedr.4870392702.
- Tamamschjan, Sofia (1937). "Neue Arten und Neuheiten der kaukasischen Flora". Repertorium Novarum Specierum Regni Vegetabilis. 42 (S3): 303–304. doi:10.1002/fedr.4870422306.
- Tamamschjan, Sofia (1967). "Umbelliferae". Flora Kavkaza. 7. Leningrad: 5–137.
