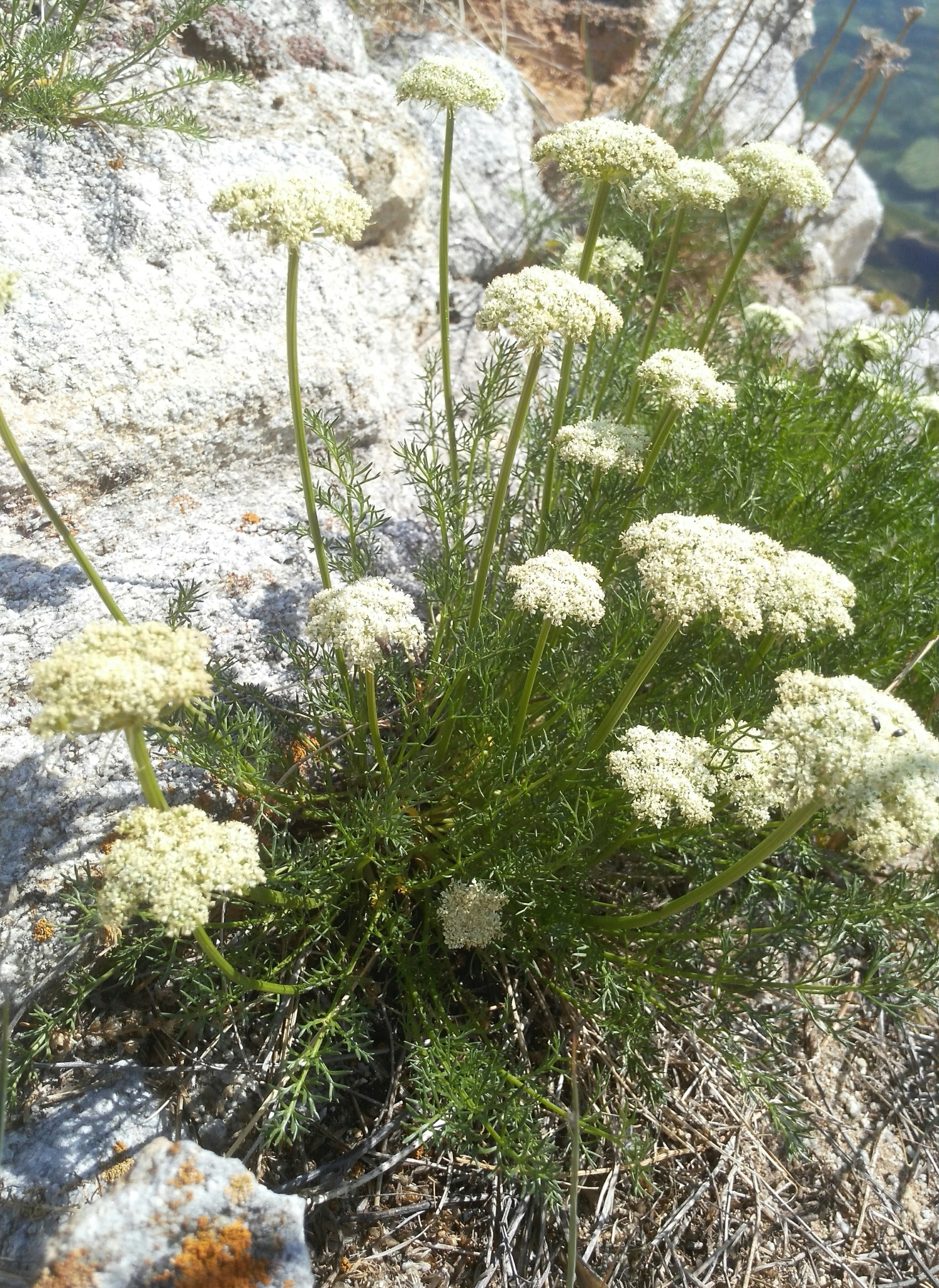
- Ferulopsis hystrix

Scientific classification
- Kingdom: Plantae
- Clade: Tracheophytes
- Clade: Angiosperms
- Clade: Eudicots
- Clade: Asterids
- Order: Apiales
- Family: Apiaceae
- Subfamily: Apioideae
- Tribe: Selineae
- Genus: Ferulopsis; Kitag.

Species
- See text

= Ferulopsis =

Genus of Apiaceae plants

Ferulopsis is a genus of flowering plants in the umbellifer family Apiaceae, native to the Altai, Mongolia and Siberia. They form cushions which are ecologically important in the cold areas in which they live. Some authorities have it as a synonym of Phlojodicarpus.

== Species ==
Currently accepted species include:

- Ferulopsis hystrix (Bunge) Pimenov
- Ferulopsis mongolica Kitag. (doubtful)
