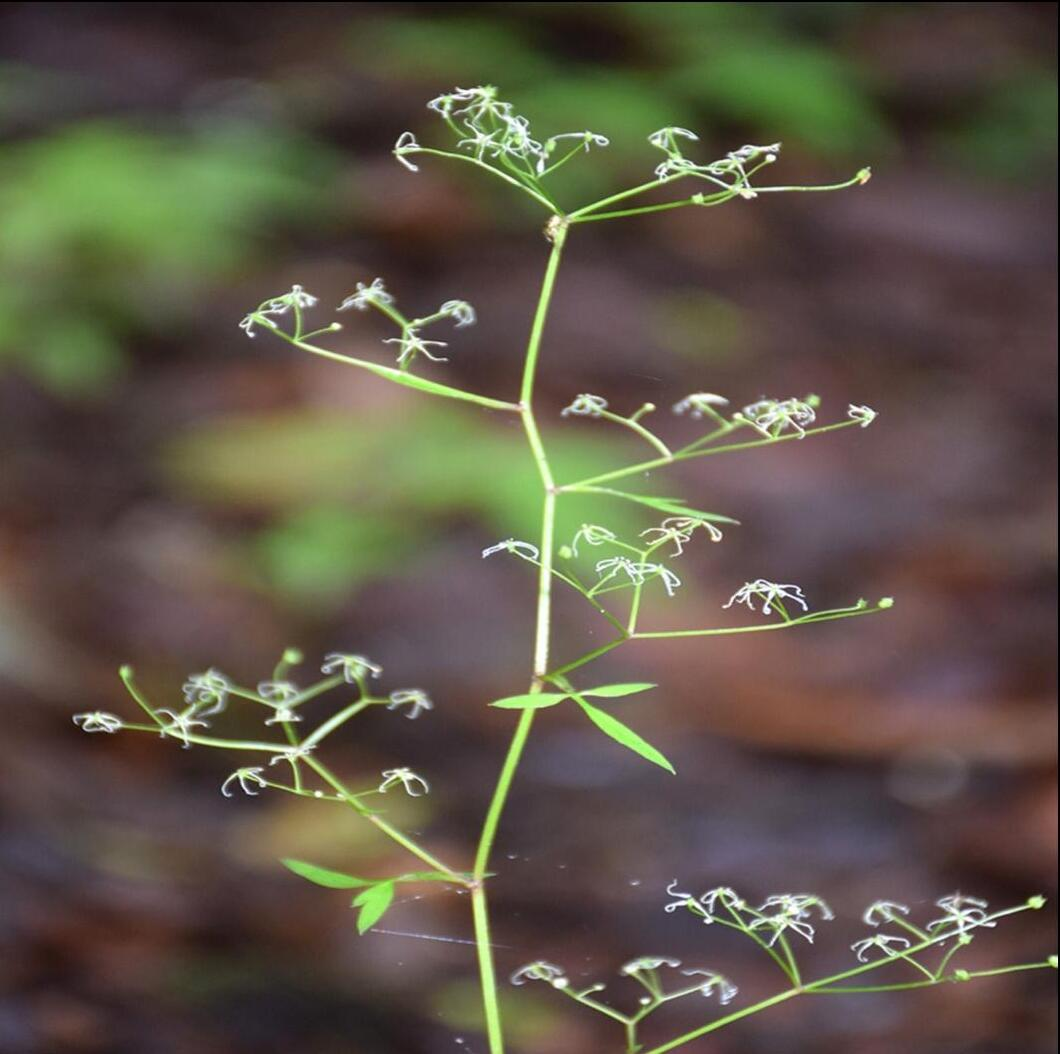
- Acronema hookeri

Scientific classification
- Kingdom: Plantae
- Clade: Embryophytes
- Clade: Tracheophytes
- Clade: Spermatophytes
- Clade: Angiosperms
- Clade: Eudicots
- Clade: Asterids
- Order: Apiales
- Family: Apiaceae
- Subfamily: Apioideae
- Genus: Acronema; Falc. ex Edgew.

Species
- including: Acronema acronemifolium; Acronema alpinum; Acronema astrantiifolium; Acronema bellum; Acronema brevipedicellatum; Acronema bryophilum; Acronema chienii; Acronema chinense; Acronema commutatum; Acronema cryptosciadeum; Acronema dyssimetriradiata; Acronema edosmioides; Acronema evolutum; Acronema forrestii; Acronema gracile; Acronema graminifolium; Acronema handelii; Acronema hookeri; Acronema ioniostyles; Acronema johrianum; Acronema minus; Acronema mukherjeeanum; Acronema muscicola; Acronema nervosum; Acronema paniculatum; Acronema phaeosciadeum; Acronema pilosum; Acronema pneumatophobium; Acronema pseudotenera; Acronema radiatum; Acronema refugicola; Acronema rivale; Acronema schneideri; Acronema sichuanense; Acronema tenerum; Acronema wolffiana; Acronema xizangense; Acronema yadongense

= Acronema =

Genus of flowering plants

The genus Acronema consists of 38 species of plants in the family Apiaceae found in the Sino-Himalayan region. Its also classified under the major group Angiosperms (flowering plants). It's in the Acronema clade with genera including Ligusticum and Ostericum.

== Description ==
It's a biennial or perennial plant with fibrous roots. It grows among rocks and in turf pathsides in broadleaf forests. It is found in attitudes from 3,000 to 4,000 meters and flowers from July to September.

== Distribution ==
It is found in regions around the Himalayas including Nepal, Bhutan, Tibet and Assam.
