= Pterygopleurum =

Scientific classification
- Kingdom: Plantae
- Clade: Tracheophytes
- Clade: Angiosperms
- Clade: Eudicots
- Clade: Asterids
- Order: Apiales
- Family: Apiaceae
- Genus: Pterygopleurum; Kitag.

Genus of plants

Pterygopleurum is a genus of flowering plants belonging to the family Apiaceae.

Its native range is Eastern China to Japan.

Species:

- Pterygopleurum neurophyllum (Maxim.) Kitag.
