= Arracacia macvaughii =

Scientific classification
- Kingdom: Plantae
- Clade: Tracheophytes
- Clade: Angiosperms
- Clade: Eudicots
- Clade: Asterids
- Order: Apiales
- Family: Apiaceae
- Genus: Arracacia
- Species: A. macvaughii

Binomial name
- Arracacia macvaughii Mathias & Constance

Species of flowering plant

Arracacia macvaughii is a plant species native to the Mexican State of Querétaro. It is known only from the type locale, in a fir (Abies religiosa) forest at an elevation of approximately 3100 m (10,300 feet).

Arracacia macvaughii has a large taproot producing a stem up to 30 cm (12 inches) tall. Leaves are up to 5 cm (2 inches) long, pinnatifid with obovate leaflets. Fruits are white. Fruits are about 3 mm long, tapering at the tip.
