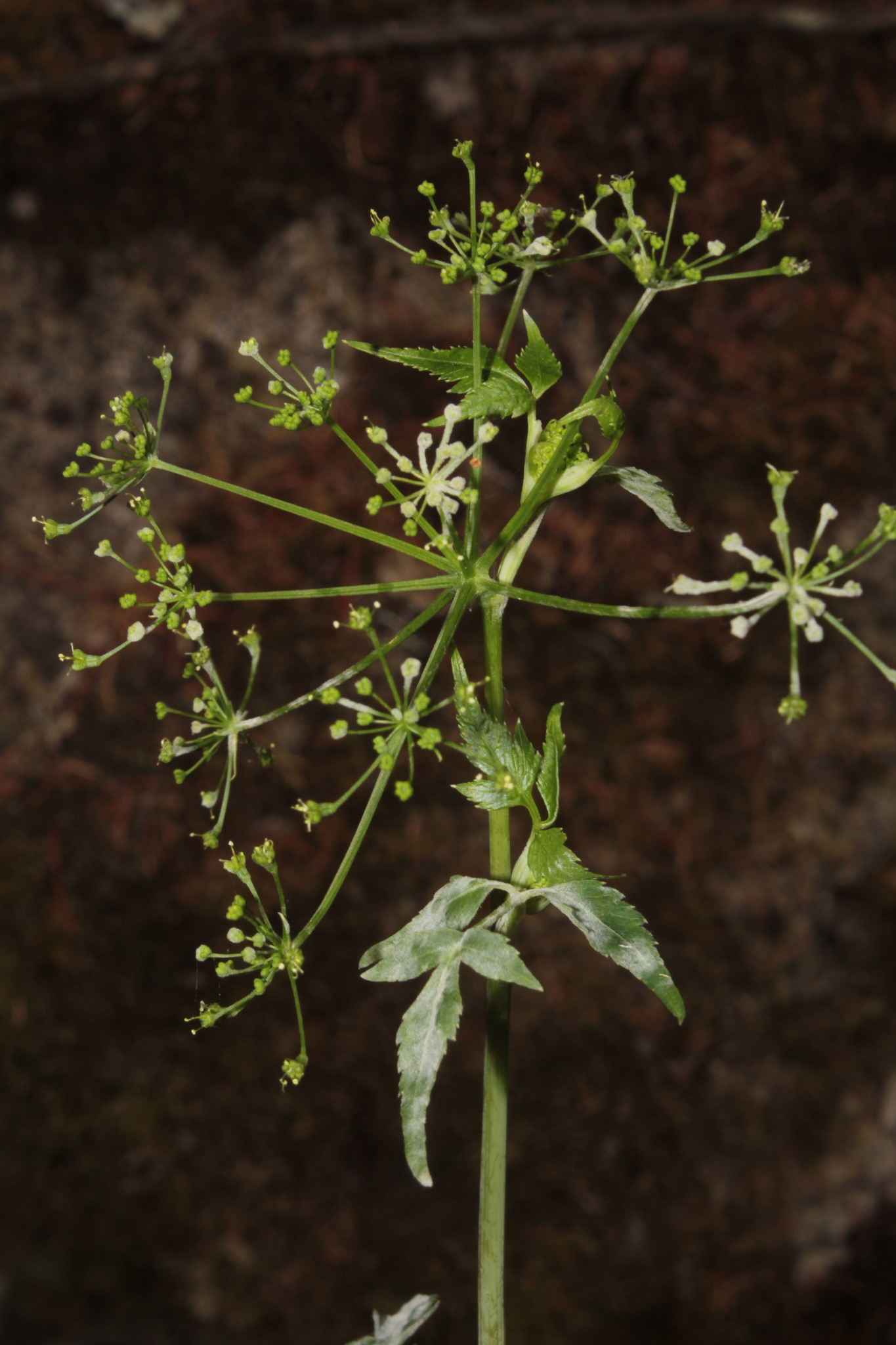

Scientific classification
- Kingdom: Plantae
- Clade: Tracheophytes
- Clade: Angiosperms
- Clade: Eudicots
- Clade: Asterids
- Order: Apiales
- Family: Apiaceae
- Genus: Arracacia
- Species: A. filipes

Binomial name
- Arracacia filipes Mathias & Constance

= Arracacia filipes =

Species of flowering plant

Arracacia filipes is a species of plant native to the Mexican State of Durango. It grows in moist, shaded areas in forests and canyons at elevations of 2,000–2,700 m (6,600–8,900 ft).

Arracacia filipes is a biennial herb with a large taproot. It produces a slender, purplish stem up to 1.5 m (4.9 ft) tall. Leaves are up to 60 cm (24 in) long, biternate or bipinnate, with ovate, doubly toothed leaflets. Flowers are green.
