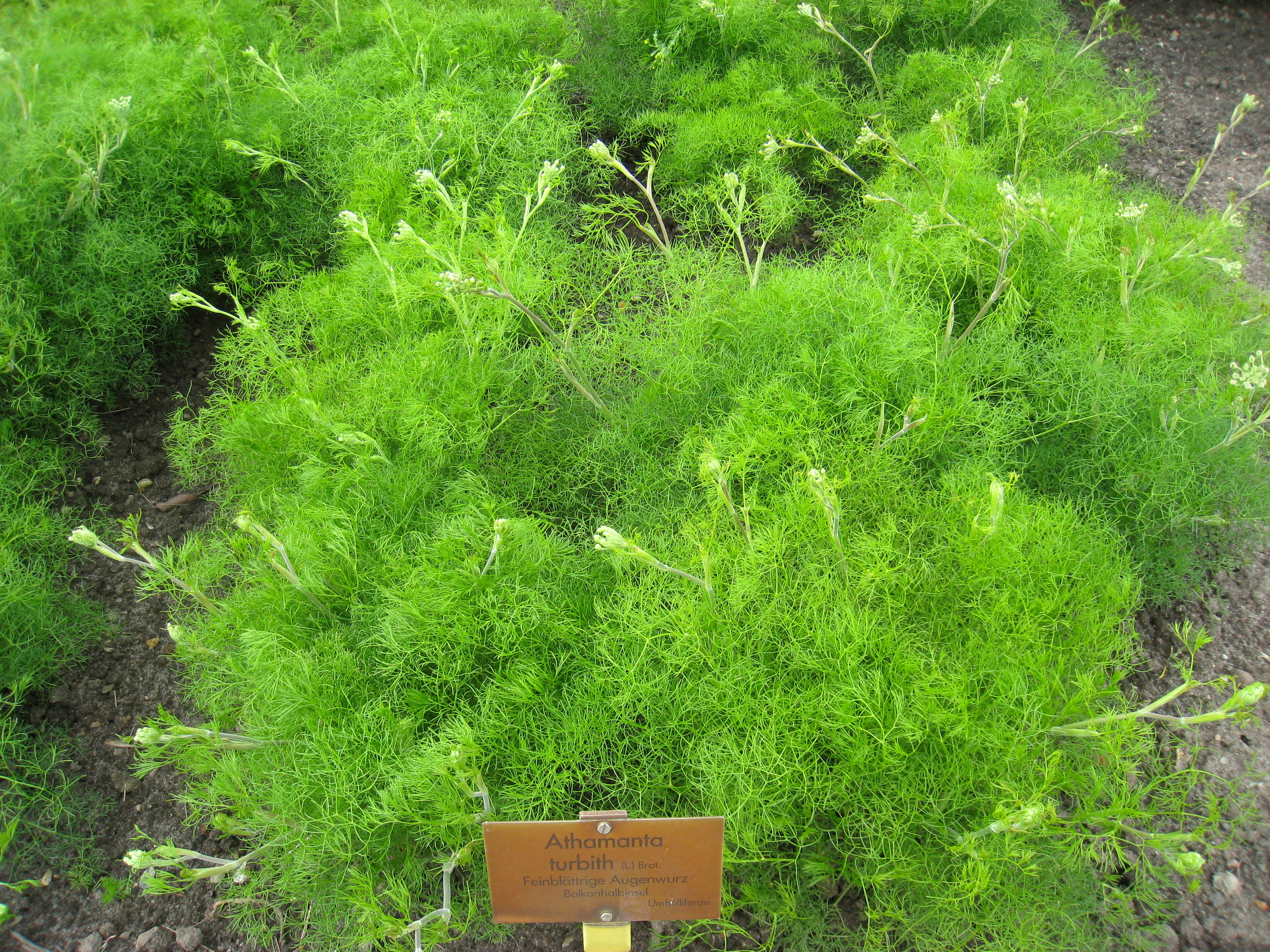

Scientific classification
- Kingdom: Plantae
- Clade: Tracheophytes
- Clade: Angiosperms
- Clade: Eudicots
- Clade: Asterids
- Order: Apiales
- Family: Apiaceae
- Genus: Athamanta
- Species: A. turbith

Binomial name
- Athamanta turbith L.

= Athamanta turbith =

Species of flowering plant

Athamanta turbith is a species of flowering plant in the family Apiaceae. It is endemic to southern Europe and northern Africa.
