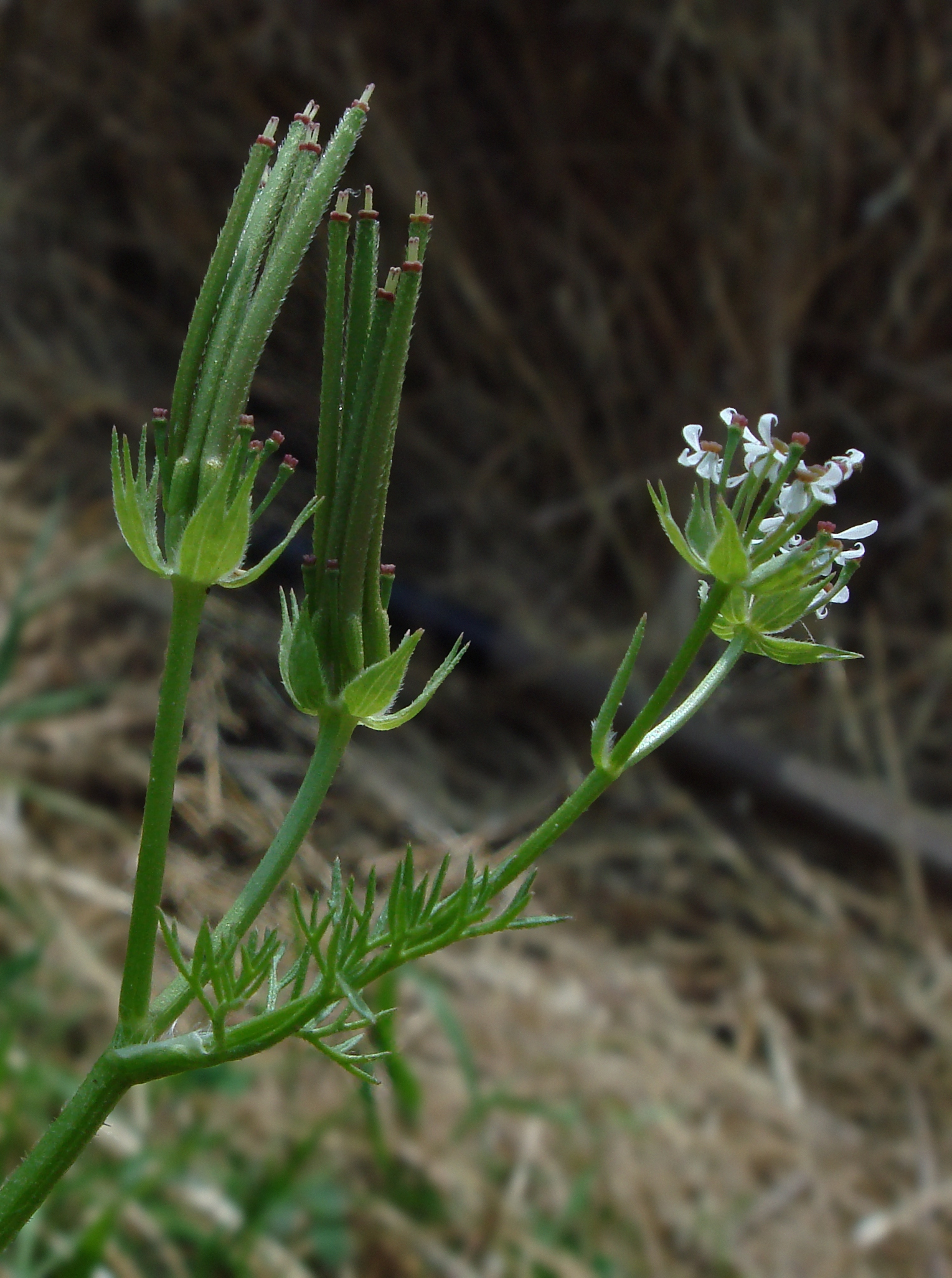
- Fruits and flowers

Scientific classification
- Kingdom: Plantae
- Clade: Tracheophytes
- Clade: Angiosperms
- Clade: Eudicots
- Clade: Asterids
- Order: Apiales
- Family: Apiaceae
- Genus: Scandix
- Species: S. pecten-veneris

Binomial name
- Scandix pecten-veneris L.

= Scandix pecten-veneris =

Species of flowering plant

Scandix pecten-veneris (shepherd's-needle, Venus' comb, Stork's needle) is a species of edible plant belonging to the family Apiaceae. It is native to Eurasia, but is known to occur elsewhere. It is named for its long fruit, which has a thickened body up to 1.5 centimeters long and a beak which can measure up to 7 centimeters long and is lined with comblike bristles.

== Description ==
(Relating to subspecies pecten-veneris - the only subspecies occurring in the U.K.) Sparsely hairy annual. Stems to 50 cm, becoming hollow with age. Leaves bi- to tri-pinnate with lobes reaching around 10mm, narrow and entire to pinnatifid, petiole broadened at base and having scarious, usually ciliate margin. Umbels with 1-3 stout glabrous to sparsely hairy rays 0.5–4 cm in length; peduncle very short or absent; terminal umbel bearing hermaphrodite flowers and lateral umbels bearing variable proportions of male and hermaphrodite flowers. Bracts usually absent; bracteoles usually 5 in number, longer than pedicels, simple or irregularly (often deeply) divided. Flowers white; sepals small; outer petals not radiating; styles with enlarged base, forming stylopodium. Fruit 30-70mm, more or less cylindrical, slightly compressed laterally, with strongly dorsally flattened beak 3-4 times as long as and plainly distinct from seed-bearing portion, constricted at commissure; mericarps ribbed and scabrid with forward-pointing bristles on margins; carpophore present; vittae solitary and conspicuous; pedicels almost as thick as rays, glabrous at apex; styles 2-4 times as long as stylopodium, erect; stigma tapering. Cotyledons tapered gradually at base, without distinct petiole. Flowering time: May to June.

== Ploidy ==
Chromosome number of Scandix pecten-veneris and infraspecific taxa 2n = 16, 26.

== Scientific name ==
Scandix is in origin a Latin word for chervil used by Pliny the Elder, who was also the first to record the descriptive name pecten Veneris signifying 'Venus's comb'.

== English names ==
When the long, erect fruits develop among the legs of the wheat, Shepherd's Needle looks so peculiar that a farm population could not help noticing it and naming it.

Scandix pecten-veneris has a wealth of evocative common names in English - most of them needle-related, in reference to the distinctive fruit, which, when mature, make it unlikely to be confused with any other native umbellifer. The English folk imagination has made of the plant the 'needle' of the following : Adam, the beggar, the clock, the crow, the Devil, the old wife/old woman/witch, Puck, the shepherd, and (more prosaically) the tailor. Of these, the tailor is (self-evidently) a user of needles in his work; Adam, the beggar, the crow and the shepherd convey rustic simplicity; the clock draws a parallel with clock hands and 'needles', and the Devil, the Witch and Puck play on the idea of the (malignly) supernatural and uncanny.

English 'comb' names for the plant are less plentiful, one, of the two recorded, invoking (once again) the shepherd and the other relating to the lady i.e. 'Our Lady' — one of the titles of the Virgin Mary. '(Our) Lady's Comb' is thus a Christianised form of 'Venus's Comb' (first recorded by Pliny in the Latin form pecten Veneris) with the name of the preeminent female figure of the newer religion replacing the name of the Roman goddess.

The connection between a harmless, edible plant growing in a cornfield and somewhat sinister supernatural entities (to say nothing of an ancient Roman goddess) is not immediately apparent to the modern mind, but may be explained by a study of ancient harvest customs. When growing corn waves in the wind, a shiver appears to run through it; and this was often described (by pre-industrial populations) as some imaginary creature running through the field. This supernatural 'creature' could be identified with the last sheaf cut at harvest time, as could certain female entities, preserving traces of half-remembered, pre-Christian goddesses. The association of grain with a goddess could be as old as the first attempts at sowing seed and collecting plants that were useful for food, and the grain field as a human-made environment in the British Isles and Ireland dates from the Neolithic period, with its attendant mythology (surviving only as iconography) colouring later Celtic myth. In this context, the Old Wife/Old Woman/Witch names for Scandix pecten-veneris can be seen to refer to a harvest goddess of the kind still remembered in Celtic countries and present in English folk belief as part of a Celtic substrate pre-dating the Saxon invasions. The folkloric entity known as the 'Old Wife' can thus be understood in relation to the Welsh Gwrach, the Northern English and Lowland Scots Carlin and the Scottish Highland and Irish Cailleach. Puck and the Devil in names for the plant can likewise be understood as conceptions of the uncanny corn spirit whose passage is marked by the waving of the wheat in the wind, the Devil being a Christian interpretation of an earlier Puck figure.

== Distribution ==
Scandix pecten-veneris has a range extending from Western, Central and Southern Europe Eastwards to Western and Central Asia and is found also in the Maghreb. Within the U.K. the plant used to be widely distributed as a weed of arable land in the Southeast of England, being found as far west as Wiltshire, but became rather rare in its former haunts, a state of affairs attributed to stubble-burning and the use of modern herbicides This gloomy tale of decline was, however, qualified in 1996 by wild food enthusiast Richard Mabey, who noted that, although the plant had suffered a dramatic decline in England, beginning in the 1950s, it began to recover with the banning of stubble-burning in the early 1990s. Furthermore — and contrary to earlier theories — the plant has proven to be resistant to modern herbicides after all and Mabey notes that the 'needles' of the plant are not readily separated from wheat by modern harvesting machinery — another factor contributing to its return to the English countryside.

== Habitat ==
Scandix pecten-veneris is a ruderal species, tending to favour dry, calcareous soils and often occurring in open meadows and woodland edges, this species does well in arable land and was formerly cultivated as a vegetable, as well as being gathered from the wild (see below).

== As an edible plant ==
Scandix pecten-veneris has a long history of use in Europe, both as a leaf vegetable and as a salad vegetable. Some of the earliest references to its consumption are to be found in Ancient Greek texts satirising the tragedian Euripides (c.480-c.406 B.C.), of Salamis Island, which portray the playwright's mother, Cleito, as a humble greengrocer, amongst whose wares was the vegetable scandix - the name of which was taken over direct into Latin as a name for chervil (a related, edible umbellifer). The edible plant scanthrix is mentioned also by the Ancient Greek writers Theophrastus, and Erasistratus of Ceos, while the variant form of the name scanthrox is used by Pedanius Dioscorides for the same plant. Among Latin authors, Pliny the Elder lists scandix among the edible plants of Egypt. Much later, the Vicentine physician Onorio Belli (a.k.a. Honorius Bellus, 1550–1604) notes that, in his day, it was eaten on the island of Crete.
