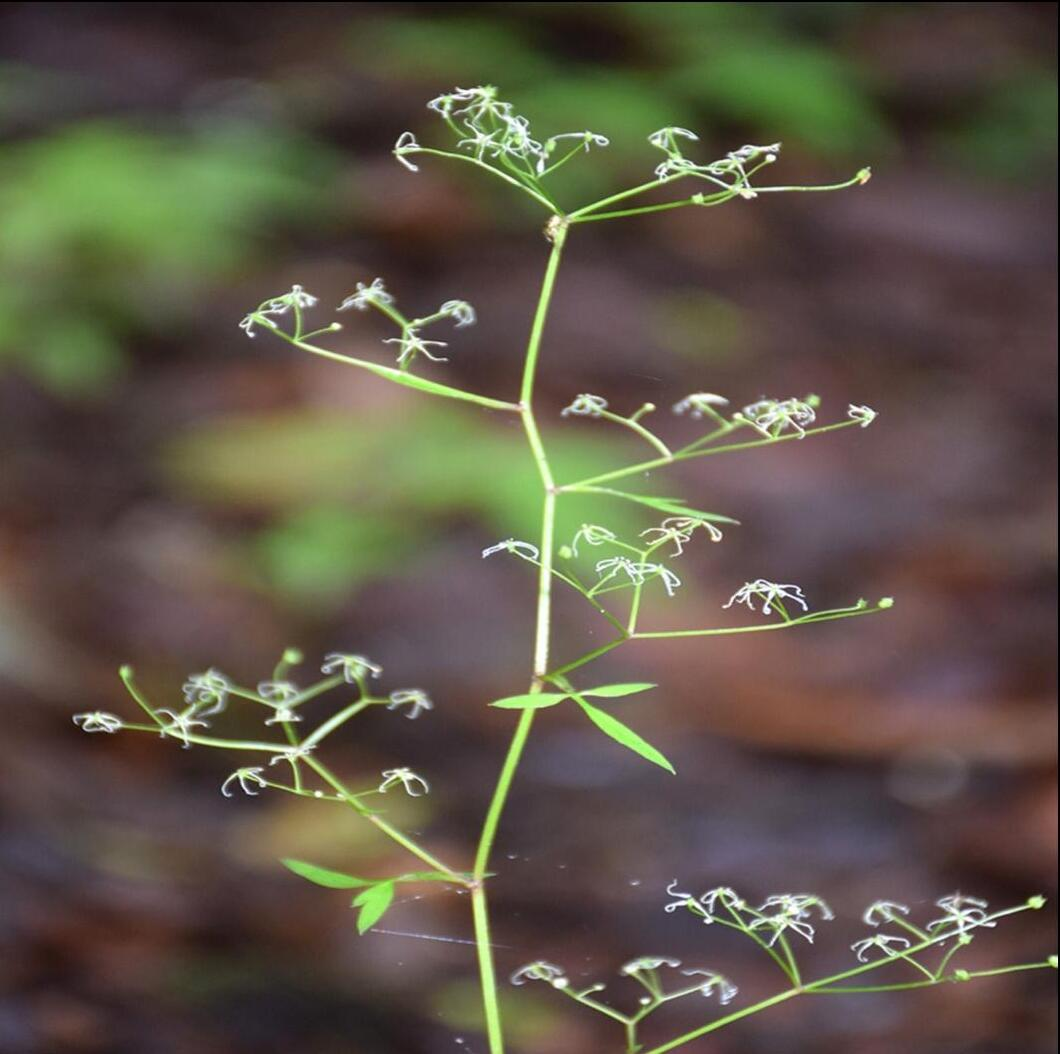

Scientific classification
- Kingdom: Plantae
- Clade: Tracheophytes
- Clade: Angiosperms
- Clade: Eudicots
- Clade: Asterids
- Order: Apiales
- Family: Apiaceae
- Genus: Acronema
- Species: A. hookeri

Binomial name
- Acronema hookeri (C.B.Clarke) H.Wolff

Synonyms
- Carum hookeri (C.B.Clarke) Franch.; Pimpinella hookeri C.B.Clarke

= Acronema hookeri =

Species of plant

Acronema hookeri is a species of tuberous geophyte in the family Apiaceae. It is native to eastern Nepal and north-western Yunnan and grows primarily in the subalpine or subarctic biome.
