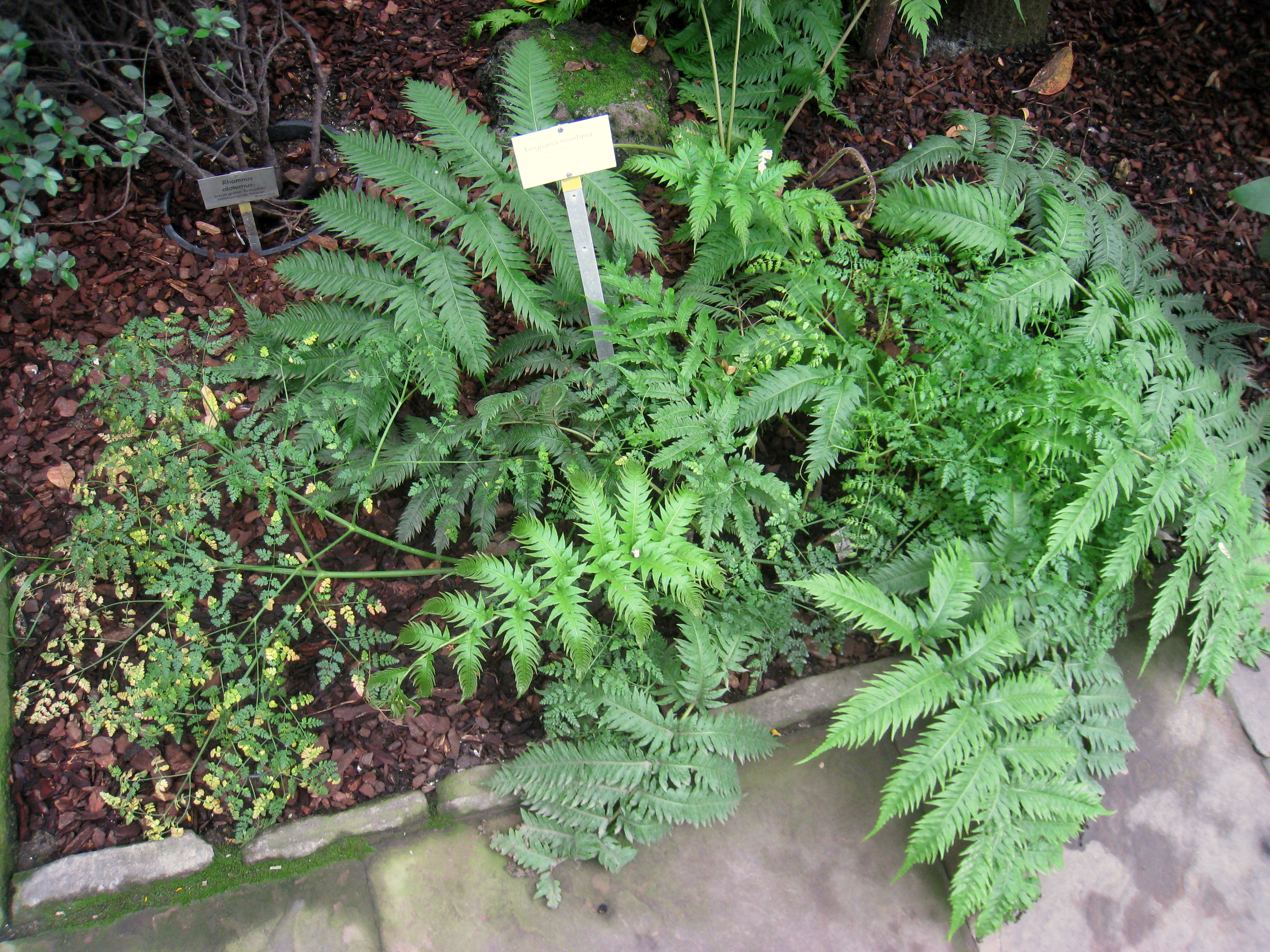
- Cultivated in Berlin Botanical Garden

Scientific classification
- Kingdom: Plantae
- Clade: Tracheophytes
- Clade: Angiosperms
- Clade: Eudicots
- Clade: Asterids
- Order: Apiales
- Family: Apiaceae
- Genus: Athamanta
- Species: A. montana

Binomial name
- Athamanta montana (Webb ex Christ) Spalik & Wojew.

Synonyms
- Tinguarra montana (Webb ex Christ) B.D.Jacks.; Todaroa montana Webb ex Christ

= Athamanta montana =

Species of plant

Athamanta montana, synonym Tinguarra montana, is a species of plants in the family Apiaceae, endemic to the Canary Islands.
