= Acronema alpinum =

Scientific classification
- Kingdom: Plantae
- Clade: Embryophytes
- Clade: Tracheophytes
- Clade: Spermatophytes
- Clade: Angiosperms
- Clade: Eudicots
- Clade: Asterids
- Order: Apiales
- Family: Apiaceae
- Genus: Acronema
- Species: A. alpinum

Binomial name
- Acronema alpinum S.L.Liou & R.H.Shan

Species of plant

Acronema alpinum is a species of Acronema in the family Apiaceae. It is a tuberous geophyte, meaning it utilizes an underground tuber to store water and nutrients to survive harsh environmental conditions. This species native range is Tibet.

== Taxonomy and discovery ==
The plant was officially described and classified in 1980 by the Chinese botanists S.L. Liou and R.H. Shan. Within its genus, Acronema, it is closely related to other small high-altitude herbs, but it is distinguished by the specific shape of its leaves and its distinct geographic range in the Sino-Himalayan region.
