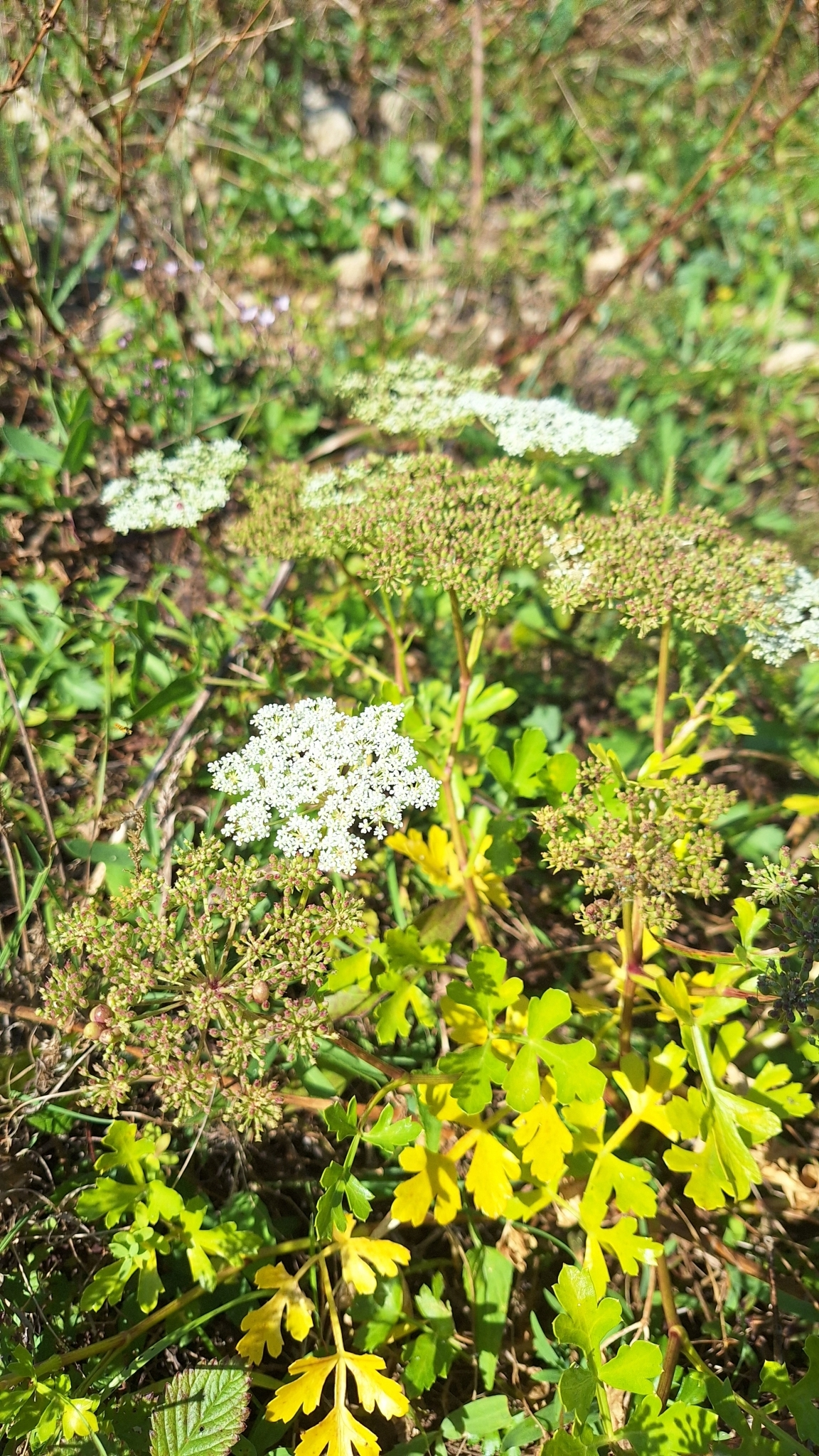
- Kitagawia litoralis

Scientific classification
- Kingdom: Plantae
- Clade: Tracheophytes
- Clade: Angiosperms
- Clade: Eudicots
- Clade: Asterids
- Order: Apiales
- Family: Apiaceae
- Subfamily: Apioideae
- Tribe: Selineae
- Genus: Kitagawia; Pimenov

= Kitagawia =

Genus of plants

Kitagawia is a genus of flowering plants belonging to the family Apiaceae. The genus name is in honour of Masao Kitagawa (1910–1995), a Japanese botanist and pteridologist.

Its native range is temperate Asia. It is found in the countries of China (within Manchuria and Inner Mongolia), Japan, Kazakhstan, Korea, Mongolia, Taiwan and the Russian regions and republics of Altay, Amur, Buryatiya, Chita, Irkutsk, Khabarovsk, Krasnoyarsk, Kuril Islands, Primorye, Sakhalin, Tuva, Western Siberia and Yakutskiya).

== Species ==
The following species are recognised in the genus Kitagawia:

- Kitagawia baicalensis (Redowsky ex Willd.) Pimenov
- Kitagawia eryngiifolia (Kom.) Pimenov
- Kitagawia formosana (Hayata) Pimenov
- Kitagawia litoralis (Vorosch. & Gorovoj) Pimenov
- Kitagawia macilenta (Franch.) Pimenov
- Kitagawia pilifera (Hand.-Mazz.) Pimenov
- Kitagawia praeruptora (Dunn) Pimenov
- Kitagawia stepposa (Y.H.Huang) Pimenov
- Kitagawia terebinthacea (Fisch. ex Trevir.) Pimenov
