= Tamamschjanella =

Scientific classification
- Kingdom: Plantae
- Clade: Tracheophytes
- Clade: Angiosperms
- Clade: Eudicots
- Clade: Asterids
- Order: Apiales
- Family: Apiaceae
- Subfamily: Apioideae
- Tribe: Pyramidoptereae
- Genus: Tamamschjanella; Pimenov & Kljuykov

Genus of flowering plants

Tamamschjanella is a genus of flowering plants belonging to the family Apiaceae.

Its native range is from Greece to Afghanistan, via Iran, the North Caucasus, Transcaucasus and Turkey.

The genus name of Tamamschjanella is in honour of Sofya Georgiyevna Tamamshyan (1901–1981), a Russian-Soviet botanist and plant taxonomist noted for describing 7 genera and more than 50 species of plant. It was first described and published in Bot. Zhurn. (published in Moscow & Leningrad) Vol.81 (Issue 8) on page 75 in 1996.

== Known species ==
According to Kew:

- Tamamschjanella cruciata (Bornm. & H.Wolff) Pimenov & Zakharova
- Tamamschjanella rhizomatica (Hartvig) Pimenov & Kljuykov
