= Arracacia papillosa =

Scientific classification
- Kingdom: Plantae
- Clade: Tracheophytes
- Clade: Angiosperms
- Clade: Eudicots
- Clade: Asterids
- Order: Apiales
- Family: Apiaceae
- Genus: Arracacia
- Species: A. papillosa

Binomial name
- Arracacia papillosa Mathias & Constance

Species of flowering plant

Arracacia papillosa is a plant species native to the Mexican State of Jalisco. It occurs on steep slopes in oak forests at elevations of 2,000–3,000 m (6,600–9,800 ft).

Arracacia papillosa is an herb up to 1 m tall. Flowers are purple. The species is unusual in the genus in having short, stiff hairs covering the fruit.
