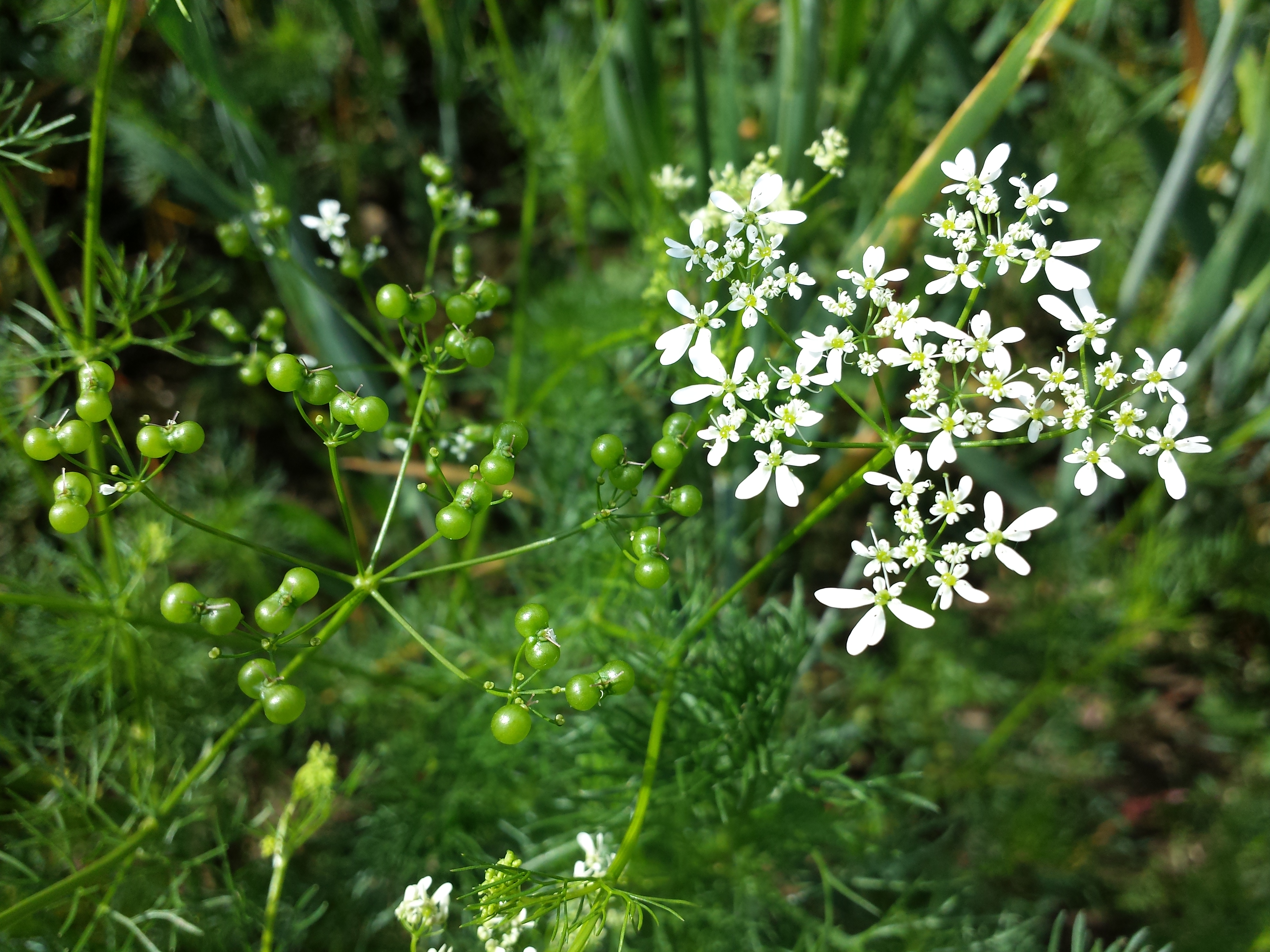
- In Austria

Scientific classification
- Kingdom: Plantae
- Clade: Embryophytes
- Clade: Tracheophytes
- Clade: Angiosperms
- Clade: Eudicots
- Clade: Asterids
- Order: Apiales
- Family: Apiaceae
- Genus: Bifora
- Species: B. radians

Binomial name
- Bifora radians M.Bieb.

Synonyms
- Anidrum radians (M.Bieb.) Kuntze; Coriandrum radians (M.Bieb.) Prantl

= Bifora radians =

Species of plant

Bifora radians, the wild bishop, is a species of annual herb in the family Apiaceae. It has a self-supporting growth form and simple, broad leaves. Individuals can grow to 31 cm tall. The species is native to Europe, Western Asia and the Caucasus.

== Sources ==
This article incorporates text from a free content work. Licensed under CC0 (license statement/permission). Text taken from Bifora radians. Encyclopedia of Life.
