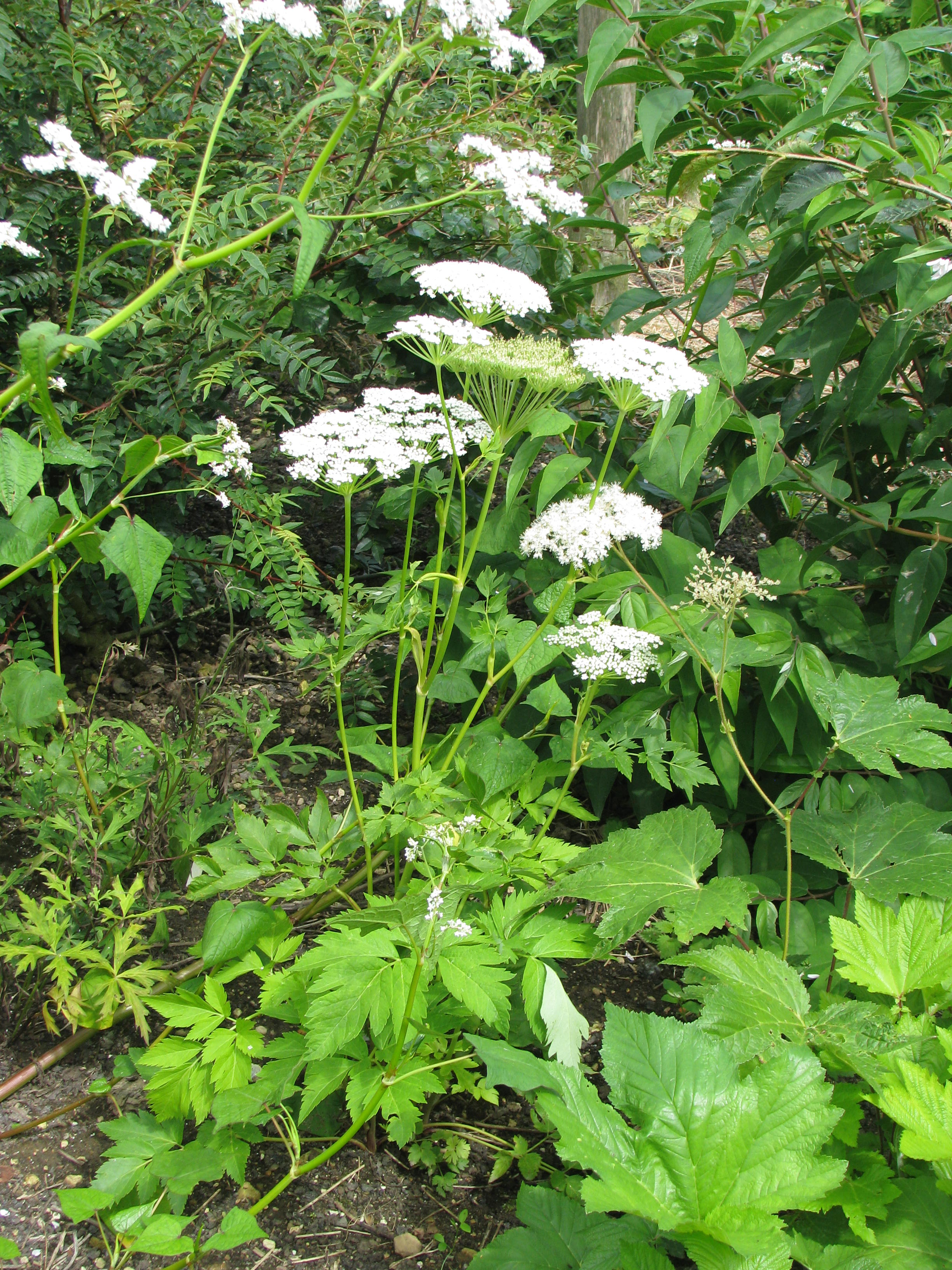

Scientific classification
- Kingdom: Plantae
- Clade: Tracheophytes
- Clade: Angiosperms
- Clade: Eudicots
- Clade: Asterids
- Order: Apiales
- Family: Apiaceae
- Subfamily: Apioideae
- Tribe: Selineae
- Genus: Dystaenia; Kitag.

= Dystaenia =

Genus of flowering plants

Dystaenia is a genus of flowering plants belonging to the family Apiaceae.

Its native range is Temperate Eastern Asia.

Species:

- Dystaenia ibukiensis (Y.Yabe) Kitag.
- Dystaenia takeshimana (Nakai) Kitag.
