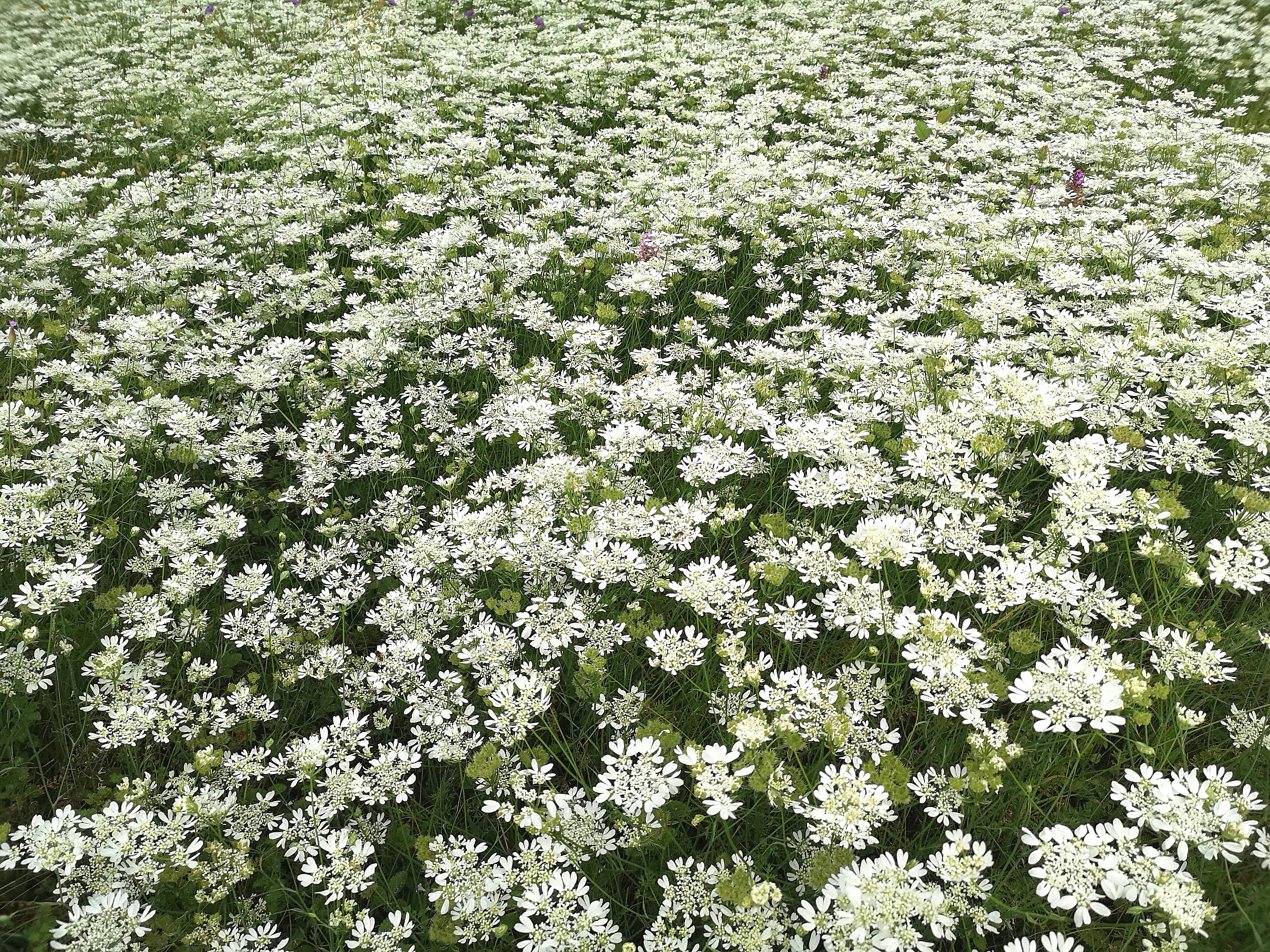

Scientific classification
- Kingdom: Plantae
- Clade: Tracheophytes
- Clade: Angiosperms
- Clade: Eudicots
- Clade: Asterids
- Order: Apiales
- Family: Apiaceae
- Genus: Orlaya
- Species: O. grandiflora

Binomial name
- Orlaya grandiflora (L.) Hoffm.

= Orlaya grandiflora =

Species of flowering plant

Orlaya grandiflora, the white laceflower, is a species of flowering plant in the family Apiaceae, native to Mediterranean Europe. Growing to 90 cm (35 in), this is a multi-branched annual with divided ferny leaves, and flattish panicles of pure white flowers over a long period in summer. The uneven size of the individual florets gives it the appearance of lace, especially when planted in large swathes.

It is a recipient of the Royal Horticultural Society's Award of Garden Merit. It prefers a sunny, well-drained position.
