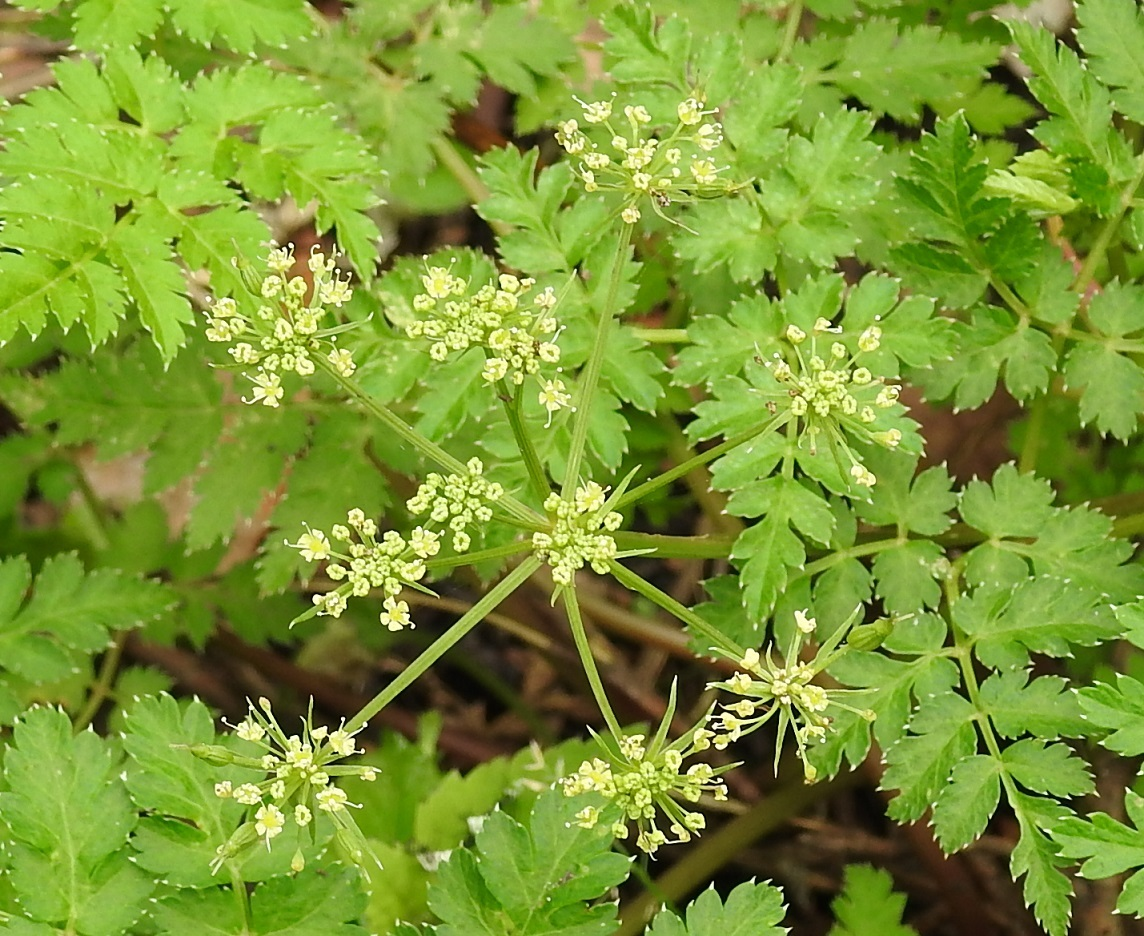
- Arracacia pringlei

Scientific classification
- Kingdom: Plantae
- Clade: Tracheophytes
- Clade: Angiosperms
- Clade: Eudicots
- Clade: Asterids
- Order: Apiales
- Family: Apiaceae
- Subfamily: Apioideae
- Tribe: Selineae
- Genus: Arracacia; Bancr.

Species
- See text.

Synonyms
- Nematosciadium H.Wolff; Velaea D.Dietr.

= Arracacia =

Genus of flowering plants

Arracacia is a genus of flowering plant in the Apiaceae. It is native to the Americas, from Mexico to Bolivia. The most important member of the genus economically is the arracacha, Arracacia xanthorrhiza.

== Species ==
The following species are recognised in the genus Arracacia:

- Arracacia acuminata
- Arracacia aegopodioides
- Arracacia andina
- Arracacia annulata
- Arracacia anomala
- Arracacia arguta
- Arracacia atropurpurea
- Arracacia bracteata
- Arracacia brandegei
- Arracacia brevipes
- Arracacia chiapensis
- Arracacia chirripoi
- Arracacia colombiana
- Arracacia compacta
- Arracacia coulteri
- Arracacia decumbens
- Arracacia delavayi
- Arracacia dissecta
- Arracacia donnell-smithii
- Arracacia dugesii
- Arracacia ebracteata
- Arracacia edulis
- Arracacia elata
- Arracacia equatorialis
- Arracacia esculenta
- Arracacia filiformis
- Arracacia filipes
- Arracacia fruticosa
- Arracacia glaucescens
- Arracacia guatemalensis
- Arracacia hartwegii
- Arracacia hemsleyana
- Arracacia hintonii
- Arracacia humilis
- Arracacia incisa
- Arracacia irazuensis
- Arracacia kelloggii
- Arracacia longipedunculata
- Arracacia luxeana
- Arracacia macvaughii
- Arracacia mariana
- Arracacia meyeri
- Arracacia montana
- Arracacia moschata
- Arracacia multifida
- Arracacia nelsoni
- Arracacia nelsonii
- Arracacia nudicaulis
- Arracacia ovata
- Arracacia papillosa
- Arracacia pennellii
- Arracacia peruviana
- Arracacia peucedanifolia
- Arracacia pringlei
- Arracacia pubescens
- Arracacia purpusii
- Arracacia quadrifida
- Arracacia ravenii
- Arracacia rigida
- Arracacia schiedei
- Arracacia schneideri
- Arracacia tapalpae
- Arracacia tenuifolia
- Arracacia ternata
- Arracacia tillettii
- Arracacia tolucensis
- Arracacia vaginata
- Arracacia vestita
- Arracacia wigginsii
- Arracacia xanthorrhiza
