= Rhabdosciadium =

Scientific classification
- Kingdom: Plantae
- Clade: Tracheophytes
- Clade: Angiosperms
- Clade: Eudicots
- Clade: Asterids
- Order: Apiales
- Family: Apiaceae
- Subfamily: Apioideae
- Tribe: Careae
- Genus: Rhabdosciadium; Boiss.

Genus of flowering plants

Rhabdosciadium is a genus of flowering plants belonging to the family Apiaceae.

Its native range is Western Asia.

Species:

- Rhabdosciadium anatolyi Lyskov & Kljuykov
- Rhabdosciadium aucheri Boiss.
