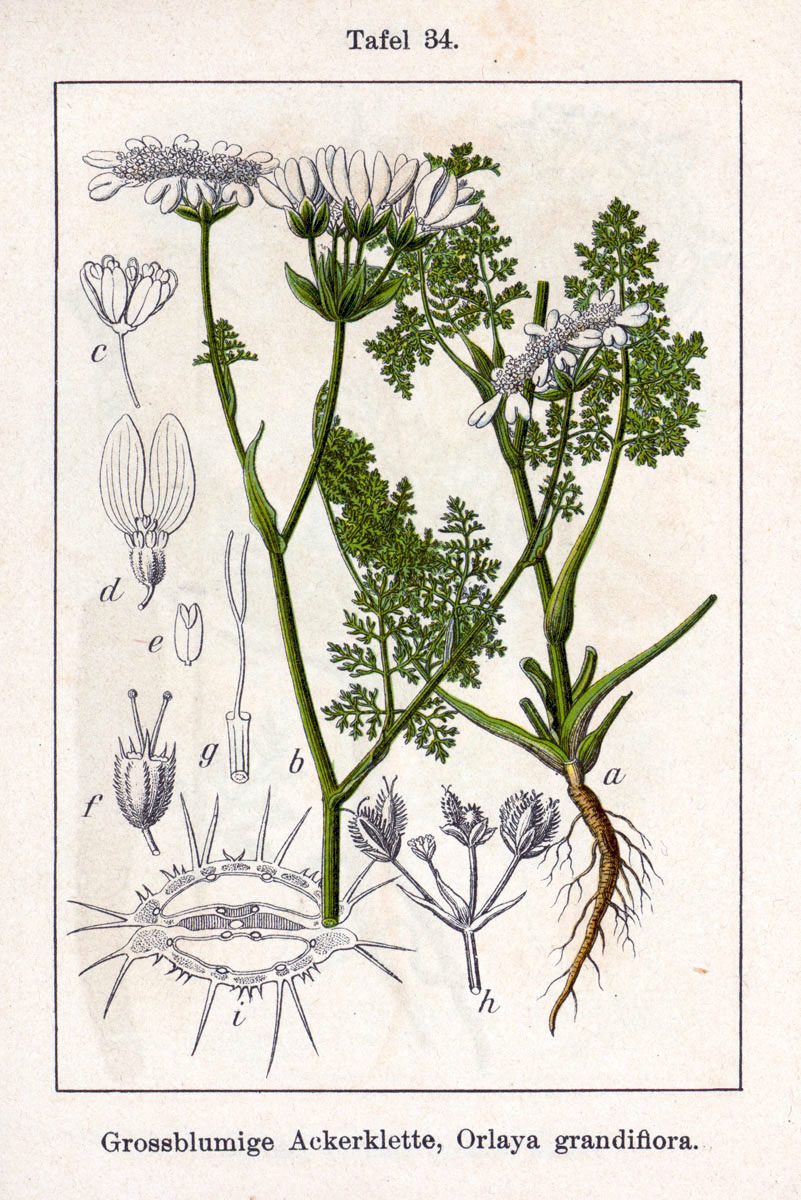
- Orlaya grandiflora Illustration by Johann Georg Sturm, in his Deutschlands Flora in Abbildungen, 1796

Scientific classification
- Kingdom: Plantae
- Clade: Tracheophytes
- Clade: Angiosperms
- Clade: Eudicots
- Clade: Asterids
- Order: Apiales
- Family: Apiaceae
- Subfamily: Apioideae
- Tribe: Scandiceae
- Subtribe: Daucinae
- Genus: Orlaya; Hoffm.

= Orlaya =

Genus of flowering plants

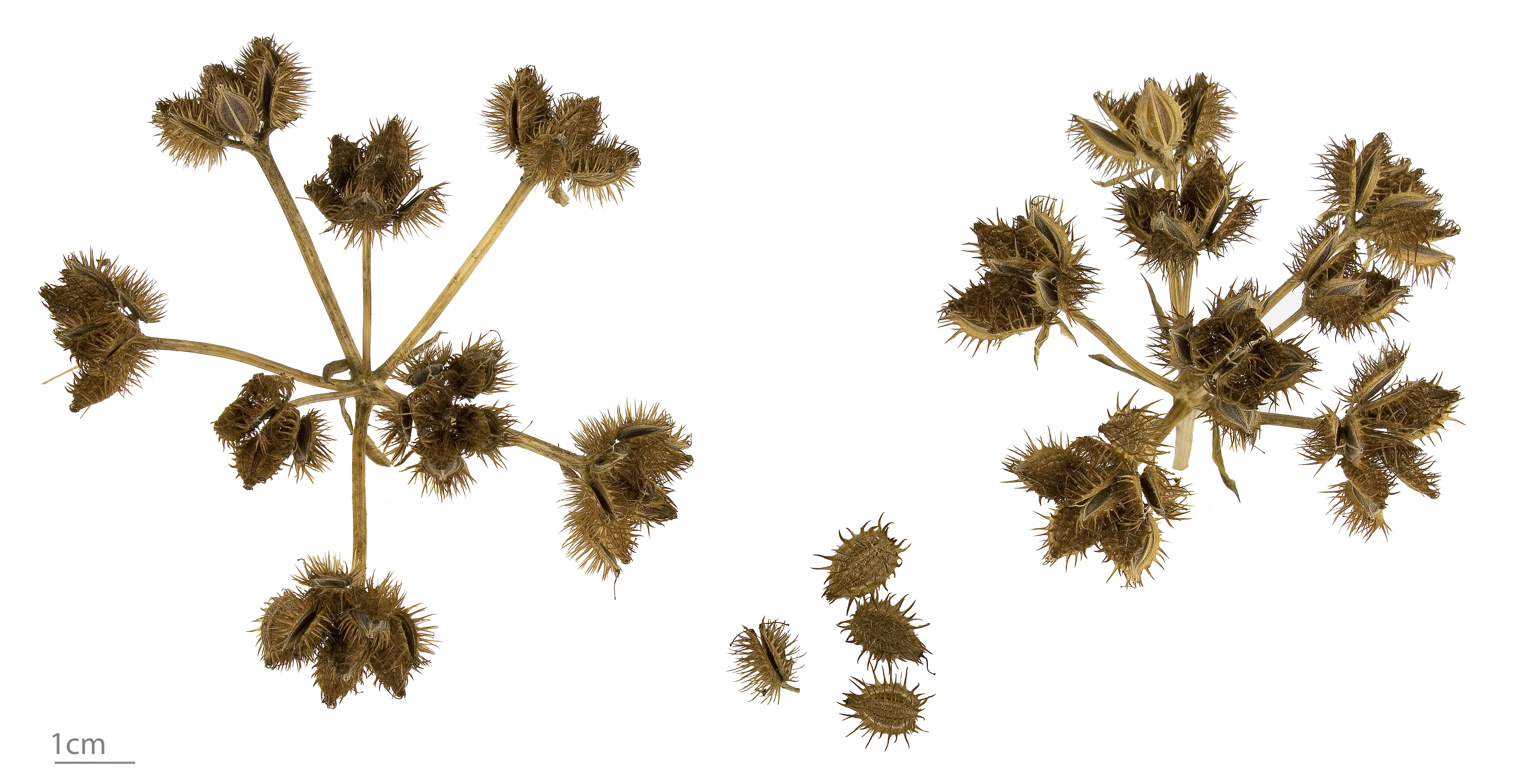
Orlaya grandiflora - MHNT

Orlaya is a genus of flowering plants from Europe in the family Apiaceae, with between 1 and 11 species. They are annuals with finely-divided leaves, and umbels of lacy pink or white flowers. O. grandiflora, white laceflower, is well-known and widely cultivated as an ornamental in the UK and elsewhere. It has gained the Royal Horticultural Society's Award of Garden Merit.

The following species are currently accepted:-

- Orlaya daucorlaya Murb.
- Orlaya grandiflora (L.) Hoffm.
- Orlaya kochii Heywood
- Orlaya topaliana Beauverd

== Etymology ==
The namesake of this genus is Johann Orlay, a Hungarian-Russian surgeon who lived from 1770 to 1829. It was the German botanist Georg Franz Hoffmann who dedicated the name Orlaya to Johann Orlay in 1814.
