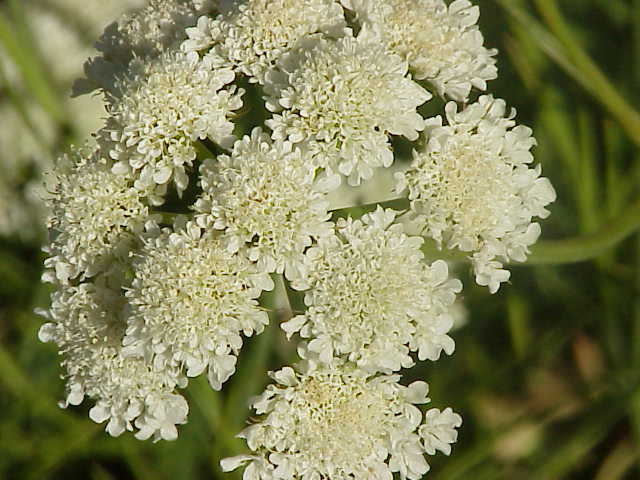
- Athamanta haynaldii

Scientific classification
- Kingdom: Plantae
- Clade: Tracheophytes
- Clade: Angiosperms
- Clade: Eudicots
- Clade: Asterids
- Order: Apiales
- Family: Apiaceae
- Subfamily: Apioideae
- Tribe: Scandiceae
- Subtribe: Scandicinae
- Genus: Athamanta; L.

Species
- See text.

Synonyms
- Bubon L.; Galbanon Adans.; Killinga Adans.; Petrocarvi Tausch; Tinguarra Parl.; Tribula Hill; Turbith Tausch; Turbitha Raf.; Pseudoreoxis Rydb.; Pteryxia Nutt.

= Athamanta =

Genus of flowering plants

Athamanta (or Athamantha) is a genus of flowering plant in the family Apiaceae. It is native to southern Europe and northern Africa.

One of the synonyms of Athamanta, Tinguarra, was originally described by Italian botanist Filippo Parlatore who named the genus after Tinguaro.

== Species ==
As of June 2024, Plants of the World Online accepted the following species:

- Athamanta aurea (Vis.) Neilr.
- Athamanta cervariifolia (DC.) DC.
- Athamanta cortiana Ferrarini
- Athamanta cretensis L.
- Athamanta densa Boiss. & Orph.
- Athamanta hispanica Degen ex Hervier
- Athamanta macedonica (L.) Spreng.
- Athamanta montana (Webb ex Christ) Spalik & Wojew. & S.R.Downie
- Athamanta sicula L.
- Athamanta turbith (L.) Brot.
- Athamanta vayredana (Font Quer) C.Pardo
- Athamanta vestita A.Kern.
