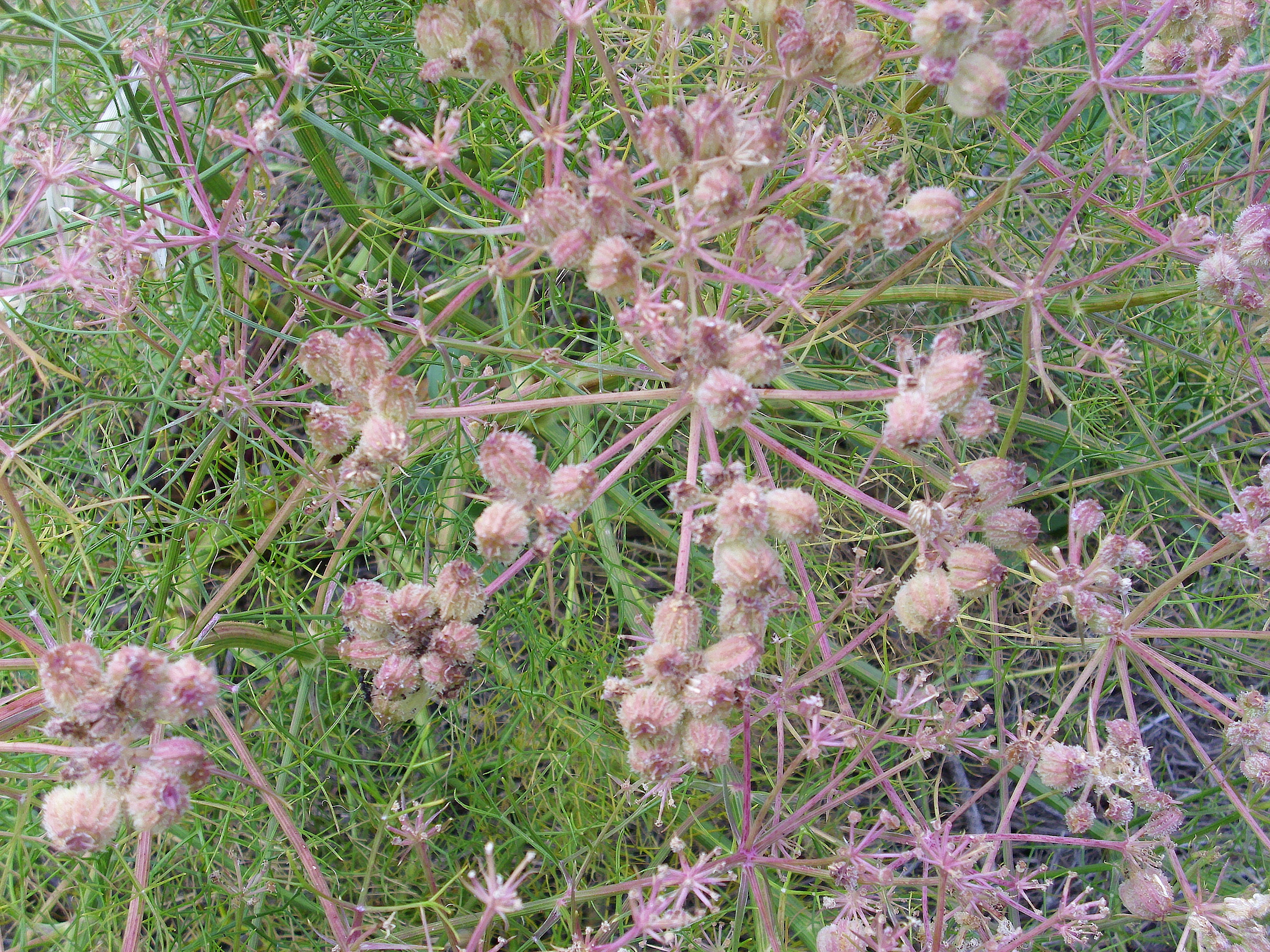
- Cachrys sicula

Scientific classification
- Kingdom: Plantae
- Clade: Tracheophytes
- Clade: Angiosperms
- Clade: Eudicots
- Clade: Asterids
- Order: Apiales
- Family: Apiaceae
- Subfamily: Apioideae
- Genus: Cachrys; L.

Species
- See text.

= Cachrys =

Genus of flowering plants

Cachrys is a genus of flowering plant in the family Apiaceae. Its species are native around the Mediterranean and eastwards to Iran.

== Species ==
As of December 2022, Plants of the World Online accepted the following species:

- Cachrys alpina M.Bieb.
- Cachrys cristata DC.
- Cachrys libanotis L.
- Cachrys longiloba DC.
- Cachrys pungens Jan ex Guss.
- Cachrys sicula L.
