= Parsley, West Virginia =

Parsley
- Unincorporated community
- Location within the state of West Virginia Parsley (the United States)
- Coordinates: 37°50′59″N 82°12′0″W
- Country: United States
- State: West Virginia
- County: Mingo
- Elevation: 863 ft (263 m)
- Time zone: UTC-5 (Eastern (EST))
  - Summer (DST): UTC-4 (EDT)
- GNIS ID: 1544597

Parsley is an unincorporated community in Mingo County, West Virginia, United States.

The community was named after W. H. Parsley, who was instrumental in securing the town a post office.
