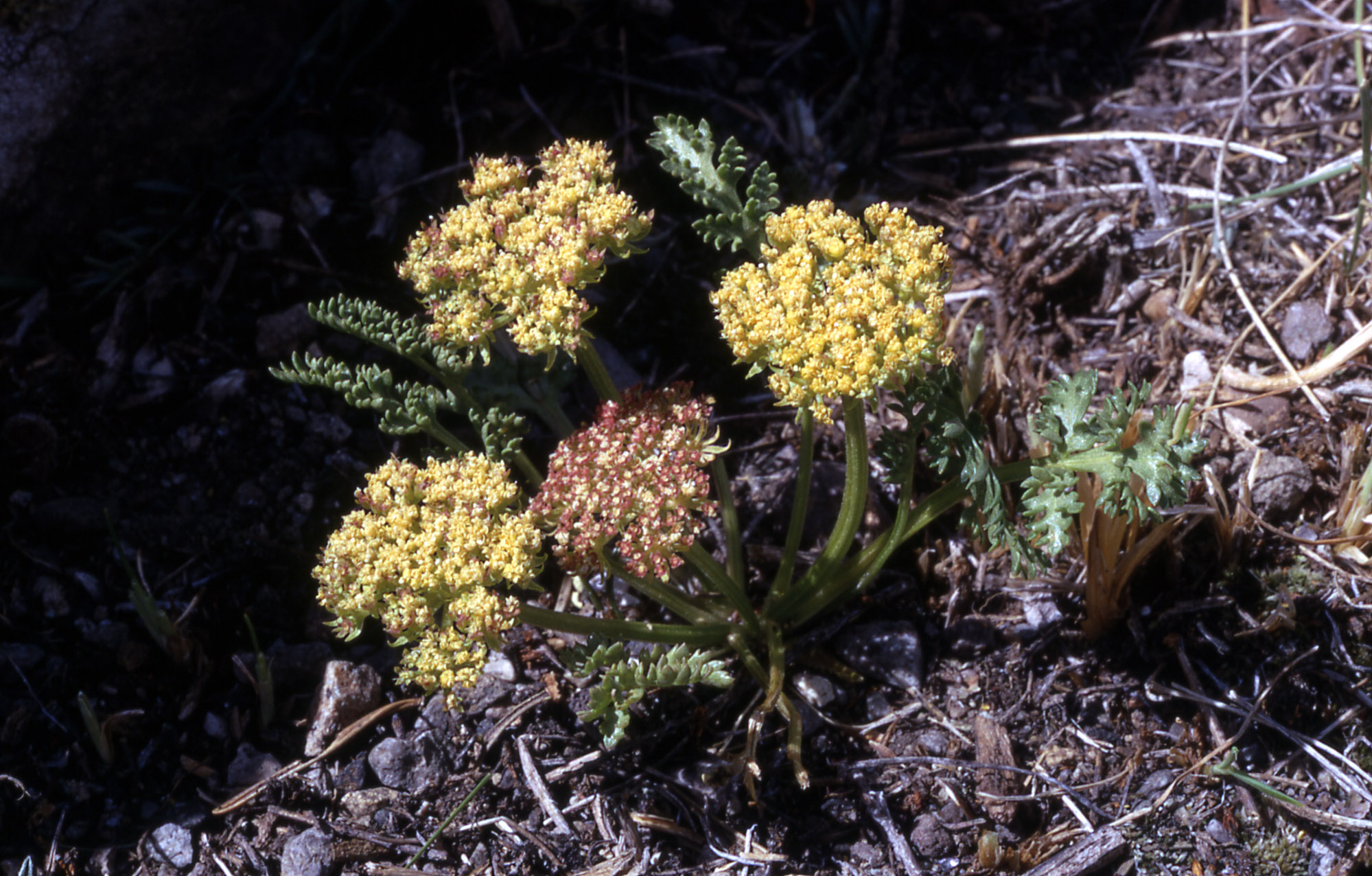
- Musineon divaricatum

Scientific classification
- Kingdom: Plantae
- Clade: Tracheophytes
- Clade: Angiosperms
- Clade: Eudicots
- Clade: Asterids
- Order: Apiales
- Family: Apiaceae
- Subfamily: Apioideae
- Tribe: Selineae
- Genus: Musineon; Raf.

Species
- See text.

= Musineon =

Genus of flowering plants

Musineon is a genus of flowering plants in the carrot family Apiaceae, known generally as wild parsleys, though plants of other related genera share that name.

Species:

- Musineon divaricatum (Pursh) Nutt. - leafy wild parsley
- Musineon glaucescens Lesica
- Musineon lineare (Rydb.) Mathias - narrowleaf wild parsley
- Musineon naomiensis L.M.Schultz & F.J.Sm.
- Musineon tenuifolium Nutt. - slender wild parsley
- Musineon vaginatum Rydb. - sheathed wild parsley
