= Stenocoelium =

Scientific classification
- Kingdom: Plantae
- Clade: Tracheophytes
- Clade: Angiosperms
- Clade: Eudicots
- Clade: Asterids
- Order: Apiales
- Family: Apiaceae
- Subfamily: Apioideae
- Tribe: Selineae
- Genus: Stenocoelium; Ledeb.

Genus of plants

Stenocoelium is a genus of flowering plants belonging to the family Apiaceae.

Its native range is Central Asia to Siberia and Western and Southern Central China.

Species:

- Stenocoelium athamantoides (M.Bieb.) Ledeb.
- Stenocoelium depressum (R.H.Shan & M.L.Sheh) Pimenov & Kljuykov
- Stenocoelium popovii V.M.Vinogr. & Fedor.
- Stenocoelium trichocarpum Schrenk
