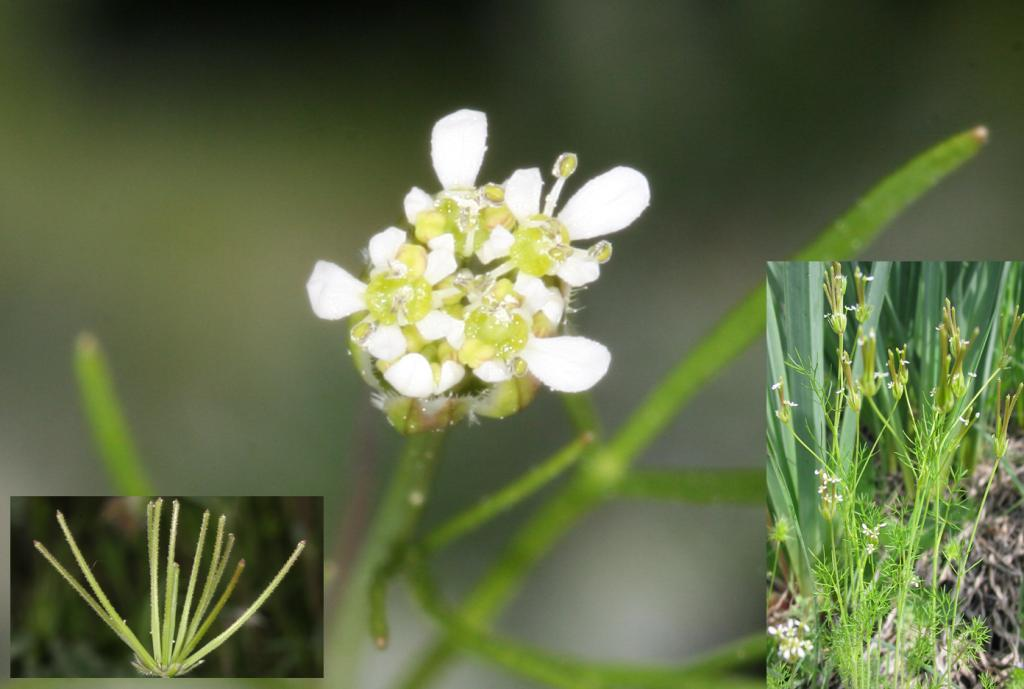
- Scandix australis

Scientific classification
- Kingdom: Plantae
- Clade: Tracheophytes
- Clade: Angiosperms
- Clade: Eudicots
- Clade: Asterids
- Order: Apiales
- Family: Apiaceae
- Subfamily: Apioideae
- Tribe: Scandiceae
- Subtribe: Scandicinae
- Genus: Scandix; L.

= Scandix =

Genus of flowering plants

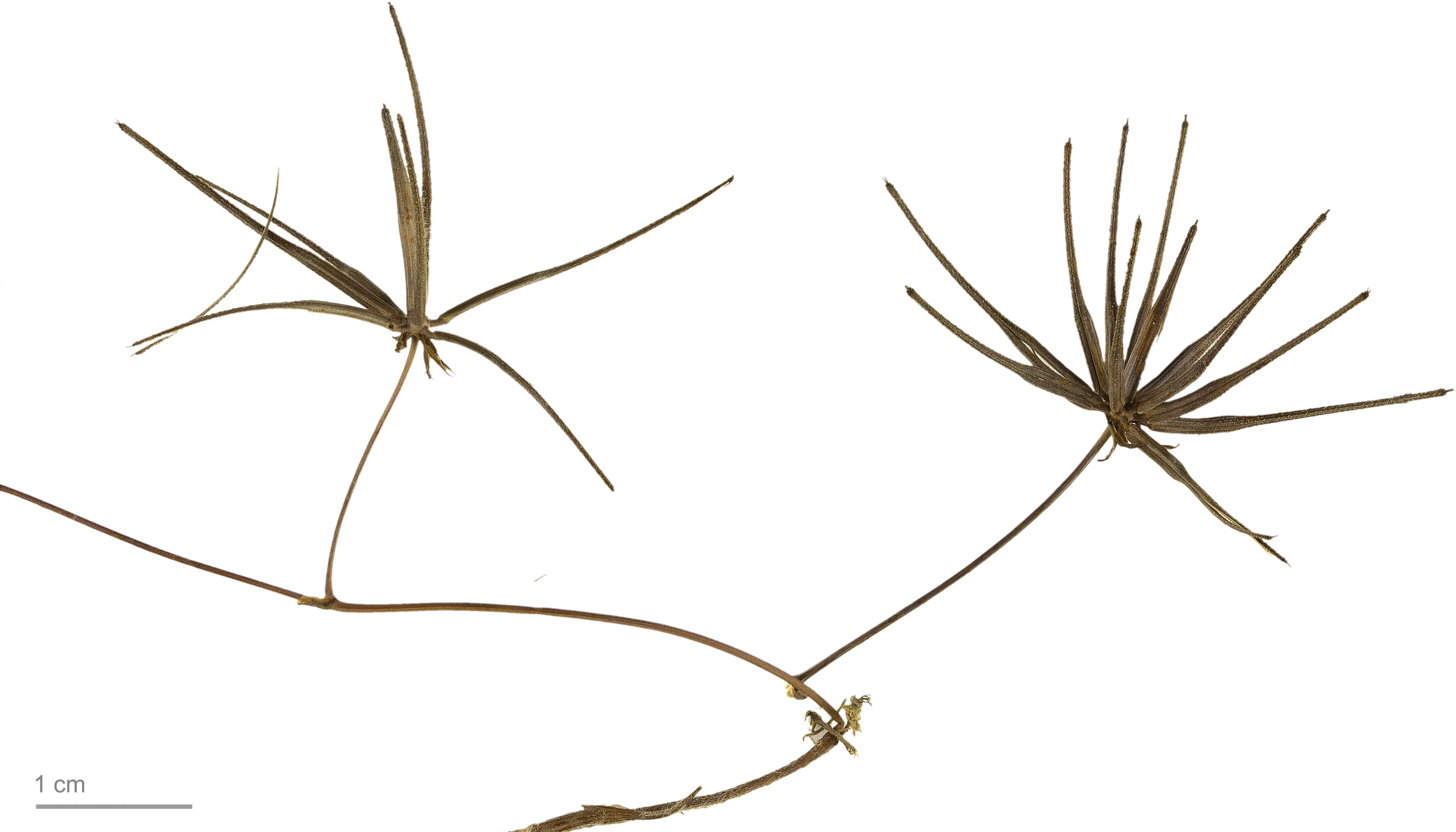
Scandix australis MHNT

Scandix is a genus of flowering plants in the family Apiaceae.

== Species ==
Species include:

- Scandix aegyptiaca
- Scandix affinis
- Scandix apiculata
- Scandix aromatica
- Scandix aucheri
- Scandix aurea
- Scandix australis L.
- Scandix balansae
- Scandix borziana
- Scandix brachycarpa
- Scandix bulbocastanum
- Scandix bulgarica
- Scandix chevalieri
- Scandix chilensis
- Scandix clavata
- Scandix cornuta
- Scandix curvirostris
- Scandix damascena
- Scandix falcata
- Scandix fedtschenkoana
- Scandix fumarioides
- Scandix georgica
- Scandix gilanica
- Scandix glochidiata
- Scandix hirsuta
- Scandix hispanica
- Scandix hispida
- Scandix hispidula
- Scandix iberica M.Bieb.
- Scandix inferta
- Scandix infesta
- Scandix laeta
- Scandix laevigata
- Scandix latifolia
- Scandix manjurkiana
- Scandix millefolia
- Scandix nutans
- Scandix orientalis
- Scandix palaestina
- Scandix parviflora
- Scandix pecten-veneris L.
- Scandix persica
- Scandix petraea
- Scandix pinnatifida
- Scandix pontica
- Scandix radiata
- Scandix rostrata
- Scandix russeliana
- Scandix stella
- Scandix stellata Banks & Sol.
- Scandix stellulata
- Scandix sylvestris
- Scandix taurica
- Scandix tenuifolia
- Scandix tinctoria
- Scandix trichosperma
- Scandix turgida
- Scandix tymphaea
- Scandix wilhelmsii
- Scandix vulgaris
