= Parsley (name) =

Parsley is a surname, and may refer to:

- Ambrosia Parsley (b. 1971), American singer-songwriter
- Cliff Parsley (born 1954), American football punter
- Eliza Hall Nutt Parsley (1842–1920), American philanthropist and schoolteacher
- Henry N. Parsley, Jr. (born 1948), American bishop
- Ian Parsley (b. 1977), Northern Ireland politician and businessman
- Jamie Parsley (born 1969), American poet and Episcopalian priest
- Lea Ann Parsley (born 1968), American skeleton racer
- Neil Parsley (born 1966), English footballer
- Osbert Parsley (1511–1585), English renaissance composer
- Rod Parsley (born 1957), American televangelist
