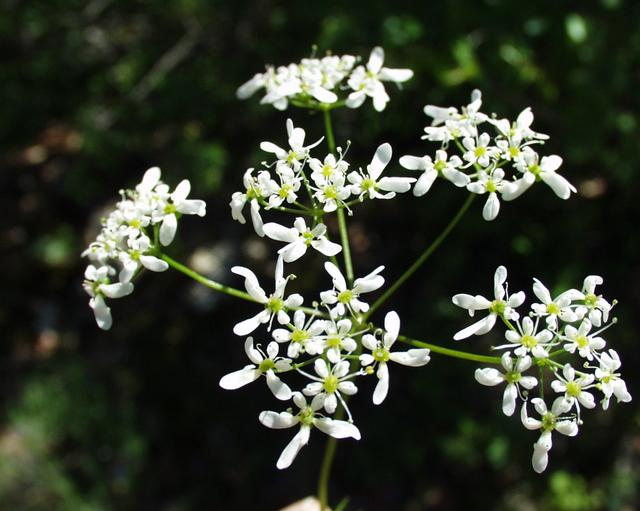
- Bifora radians

Scientific classification
- Kingdom: Plantae
- Clade: Tracheophytes
- Clade: Angiosperms
- Clade: Eudicots
- Clade: Asterids
- Order: Apiales
- Family: Apiaceae
- Subfamily: Apioideae
- Tribe: Coriandreae
- Genus: Bifora; Hoffm.

Species
- Bifora americana; Bifora radians; Bifora testiculata

Synonyms
- Atrema DC.

= Bifora (plant) =

Genus of flowering plants

Bifora is a cosmopolitan genus of flowering plant in the family Apiaceae, of disjunct distribution, with 3 species, two Eurasian and one American.

- Bifora radians has a range extending from Spain eastward through south central and Southern Europe to Iran.
- Bifora testiculata has a wider and more southerly distribution, extending west–east from Spain to Uzbekistan and taking in, to the south, North Africa, the Levant and Saudi Arabia.
- Bifora americana (Common name: prairie bishop's weed) has a southerly distribution within the United States, being confined to Texas and Arkansas, although it has also been introduced into Alabama.

== Description ==
Annual herbs. Leaves doubly pinnatisect. Inflorescence bearing usually both bracts and bracteoles. Sepals absent. Petals white, slightly emarginate, tips inflexed. Fruits schizocarp, the mericarps subglobose with rugose (warty) exteriors and short stylopodium and united by a narrow zone of commissure; ribs insignificant when seen in transverse section; vittae not apparent. Endosperm of seed concave.

== Taxonomy ==
The genus was described by Georg Franz Hoffmann and published in Genera Plantarum Umbelliferarum xxxiv, 191 in Moscow in the year 1816. The type species is Bifora dicocca Hoffm., the plant so described being now known correctly as Bifora testiculata.

It is also in Tribe Coriandreae.

== Medicinal Use of B. testiculata in Jordan ==
In Jordan, the Mediterranean / South West Asian species B. testiculata is known by the Jordanian Arabic common name كزبرة (kazbira) which is also sometimes applied to the closely related Apiaceous herb coriander (cilantro). A tisane prepared from the seed-like mericarp fruits is used as a sedative and to treat stomach pains.

== B. testiculata former grain alien in U.K. ==
A few specimens of Bifora testiculata were found growing in the north of the British county of Yorkshire in the years 1893 and 1895, this introduced plant species having been introduced inadvertently in imported grain. The plant had not (as of the year 2000), however, been recorded in the area since.
