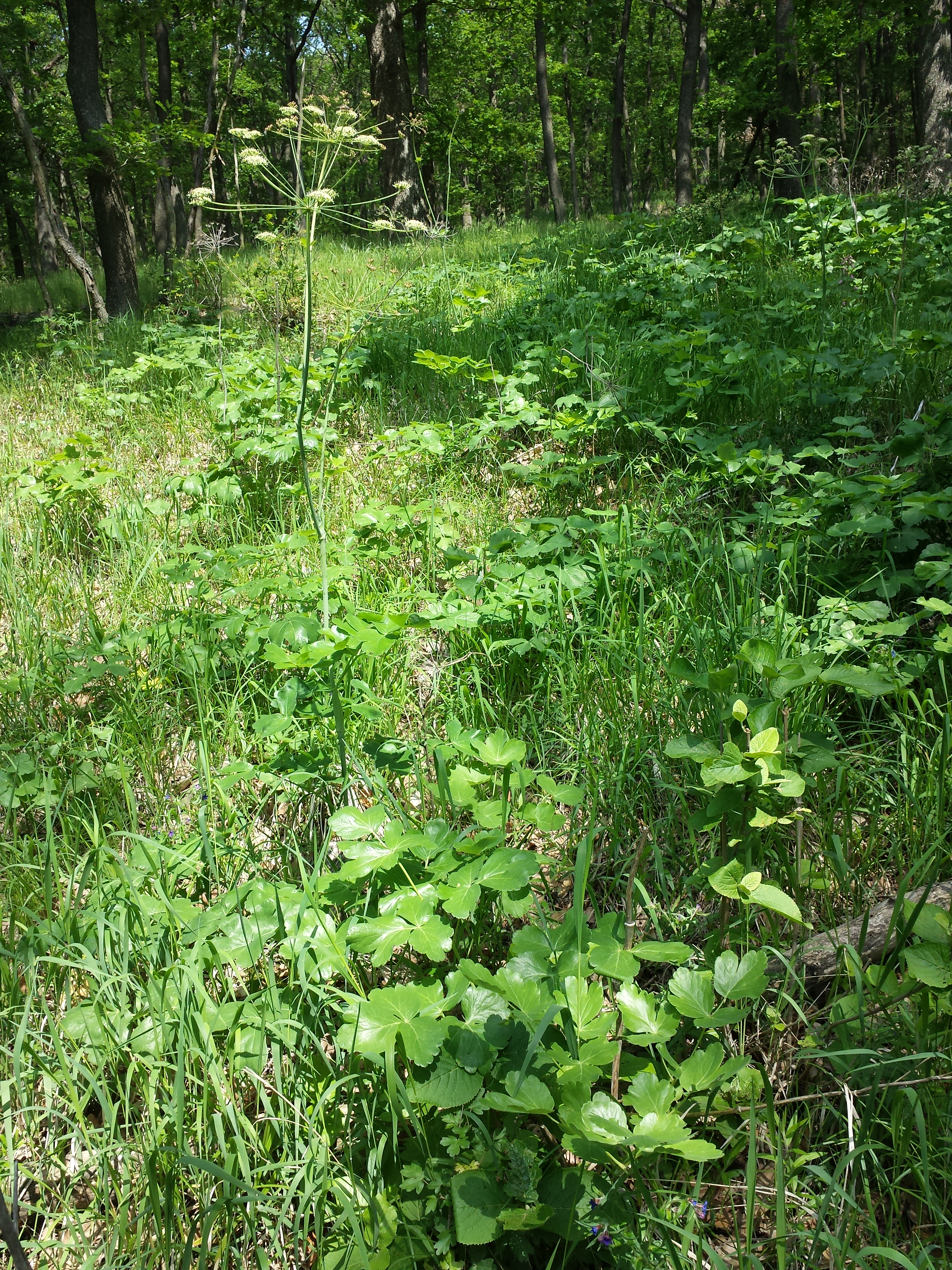
- Laser trilobum in Lower Austria

Scientific classification
- Kingdom: Plantae
- Clade: Tracheophytes
- Clade: Angiosperms
- Clade: Eudicots
- Clade: Asterids
- Order: Apiales
- Family: Apiaceae
- Subfamily: Apioideae
- Tribe: Scandiceae
- Subtribe: Daucinae
- Genus: Laser; Borkh. ex P.Gaertn., B.Mey. & Scherb.

Species
- See text

Synonyms
- Acanthopleura K.Koch; Galbanum D.Don; Polylophium Boiss.

= Laser (plant) =

Genus of plants

Laser is a genus of flowering plants in the family Apiaceae, native to Europe and southwestern Asia, from France east to the Ural Mountains in Russia and northern Iran. The genus was first described in 1799.

== Species ==
As of November 2022, Plants of the World Online accepted the following species:

- Laser affine (Ledeb.) Wojew. & Spalik – Turkey, Transcaucasus
- Laser archangelica (Wulfen) Spalik & Wojew. – Eastern Europe from Poland south to Bulgaria
- Laser carduchorum (Hedge & Lamond) Wojew. & Spalik – Turkey (endemic)
- Laser involucratum (Pall. ex Schult.) Spalik & Wojew. – northern Iran (endemic)
- Laser panjutinii (Manden. & Schischk.) Banasiak, Wojew. & Spalik – Transcaucasus (endemic)
- Laser stevenii (Fisch. & Trautv.) Wojew. & Spalik – North Caucasus, Transcaucasus
- Laser trilobum (L.) Borkh. – France east to the Ural Mountains in Russia and northern Iran
