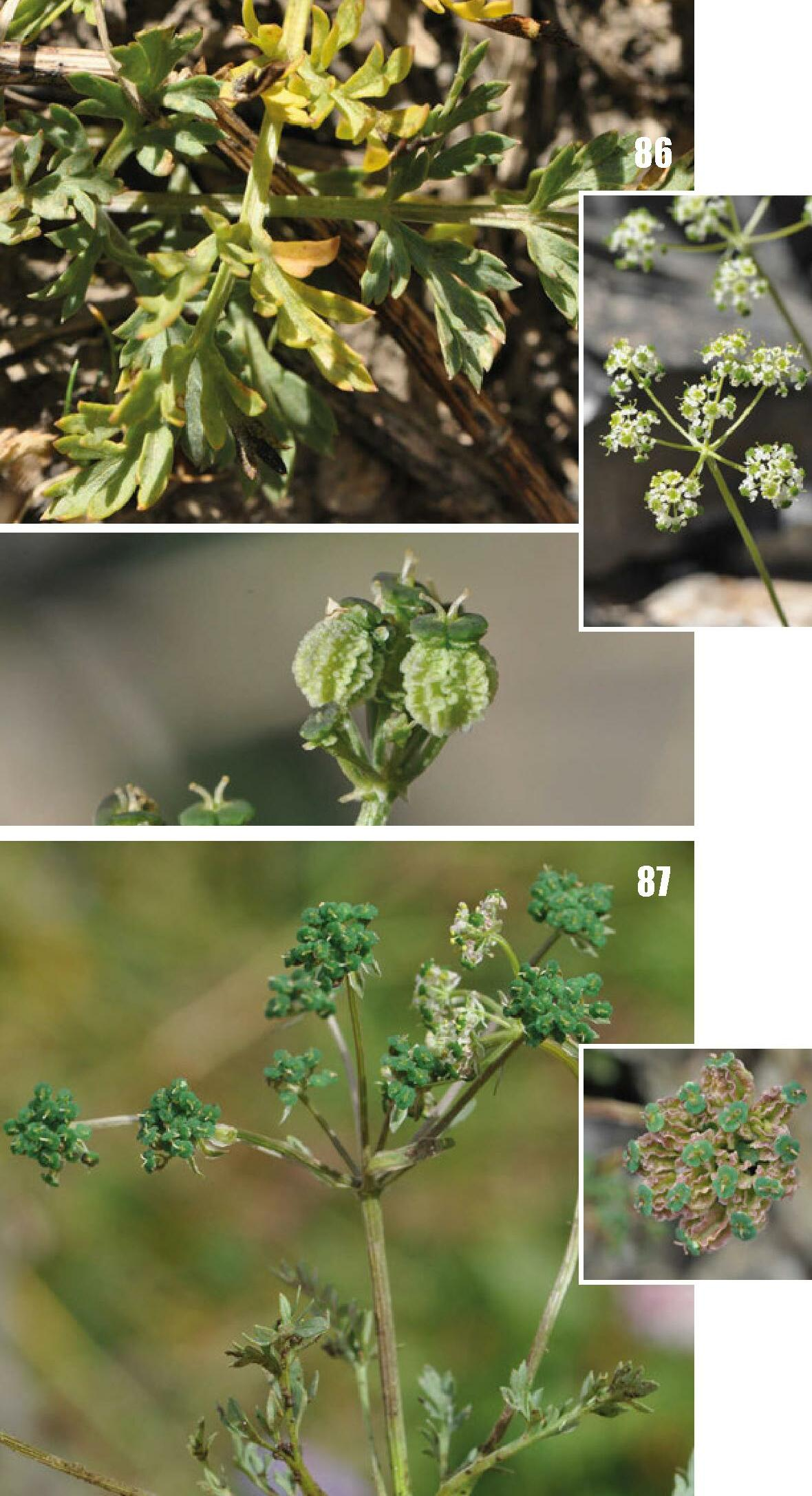
- A. roseum (86) and A. simplex (87)

Scientific classification
- Kingdom: Plantae
- Clade: Tracheophytes
- Clade: Angiosperms
- Clade: Eudicots
- Clade: Asterids
- Order: Apiales
- Family: Apiaceae
- Subfamily: Apioideae
- Tribe: Pleurospermeae
- Genus: Aulacospermum; Ledeb.

Species
- See text

= Aulacospermum =

Genus of flowering plants

Aulacospermum is a genus of flowering plants in the family Apiaceae, with 15 accepted species. It is endemic to Central Asia and Eastern Europe.

== Species ==
- Aulacospermum anomalum (Ledeb.) Ledeb.
- Aulacospermum darwasicum (Lipsky) Schischk.
- Aulacospermum gonocaulum Popov
- Aulacospermum gracile Pimenov & Kljuykov
- Aulacospermum ikonnikovii Kamelin
- Aulacospermum multifidum (Sm.) Meinsh.
- Aulacospermum pauciradiatum (Boiss. & Hohen.) Kljuykov, Pimenov & V.N.Tikhom.
- Aulacospermum plicatum Pimenov & Kljuykov
- Aulacospermum popovii (Korovin) Kljuykov, Pimenov & V.N.Tikhom.
- Aulacospermum roseum Korovin
- Aulacospermum schischkinii V.M.Vinogr.
- Aulacospermum stylosum (C.B.Clarke) Rech.f. & Riedl
- Aulacospermum tenuisectum Korovin
- Aulacospermum tianschanicum (Korovin) C.Norman
- Aulacospermum turkestanicum (Franch.) Schischk.
