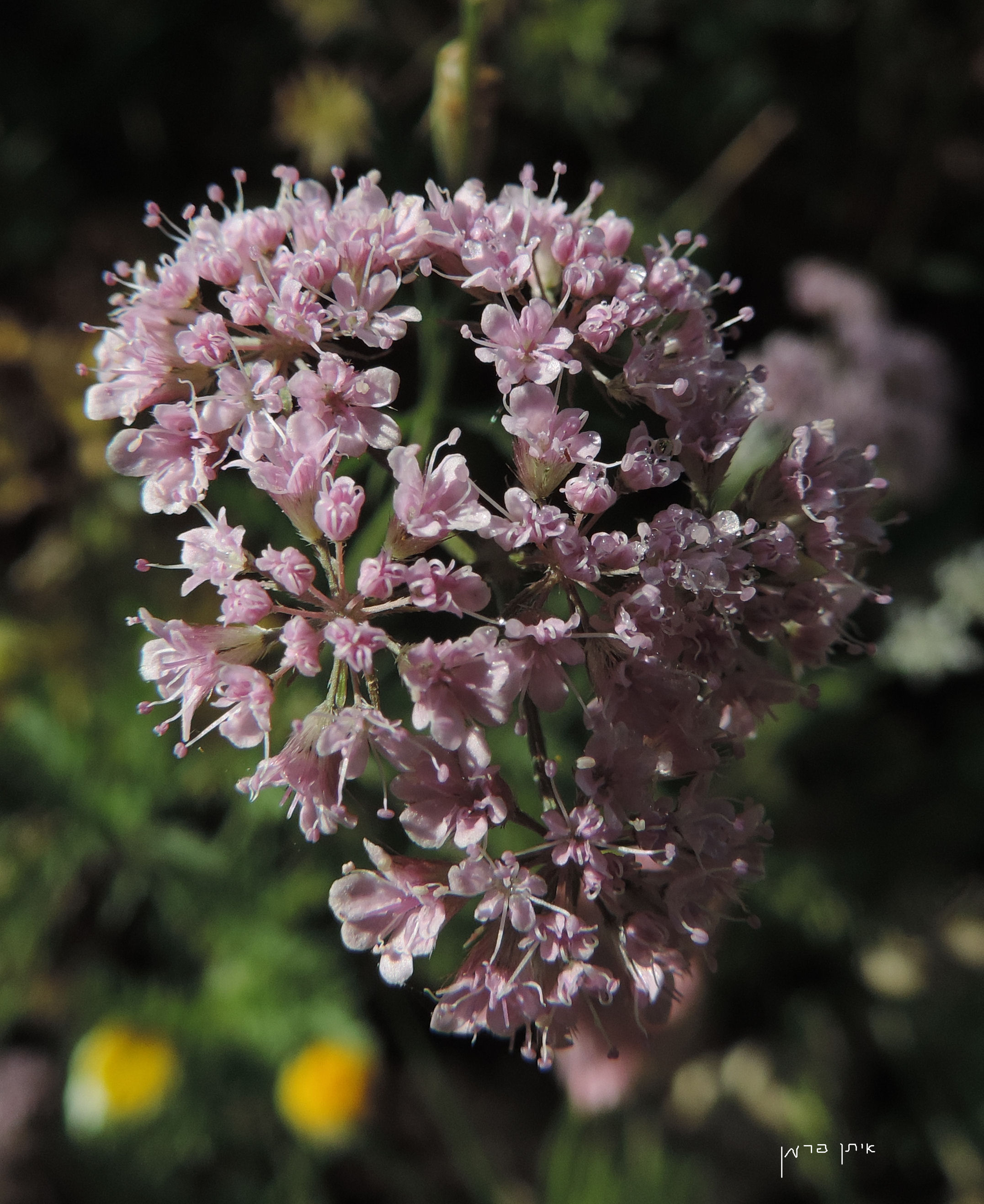

Scientific classification
- Kingdom: Plantae
- Clade: Embryophytes
- Clade: Tracheophytes
- Clade: Angiosperms
- Clade: Eudicots
- Clade: Asterids
- Order: Apiales
- Family: Apiaceae
- Genus: Chaetosciadium; Boiss.
- Species: C. trichospermum

Binomial name
- Chaetosciadium trichospermum (L.) Boiss.

Synonyms
- Acularia trichosperma (L.) Raf.; Anthriscus trichosperma (L.) Pers.; Caucalis trichosperma (L.) Delile ex Steud.; Chaerophyllum sativum M.Bieb., nom. illeg.; Chaerophyllum trichospermum (L.) Lam.; Rhabdosiadium trichospermum (L.) M.Hiroe; Scandix trichosperma L.; Torilis trichosperma (L.) Spreng.

= Chaetosciadium =

Genus of flowering plants

Chaetosciadium is a monotypic genus of flowering plants in the family Apiaceae. Its only species is Chaetosciadium trichospermum. It is native to Iraq, Lebanon, Syria, Palestine and Saudi Arabia. It is common in Israel.
