= Sphallerocarpus =

Scientific classification
- Kingdom: Plantae
- Clade: Tracheophytes
- Clade: Angiosperms
- Clade: Eudicots
- Clade: Asterids
- Order: Apiales
- Family: Apiaceae
- Subfamily: Apioideae
- Tribe: Scandiceae
- Subtribe: Scandicinae
- Genus: Sphallerocarpus; Besser ex DC.
- Species: S. gracilis

Binomial name
- Sphallerocarpus gracilis (Besser ex Trevir.) Koso-Pol.

Genus of plants

Sphallerocarpus is a monotypic genus of flowering plants belonging to the family Apiaceae. Its only species is Sphallerocarpus gracilis. Its native range is Siberia to Korea.
