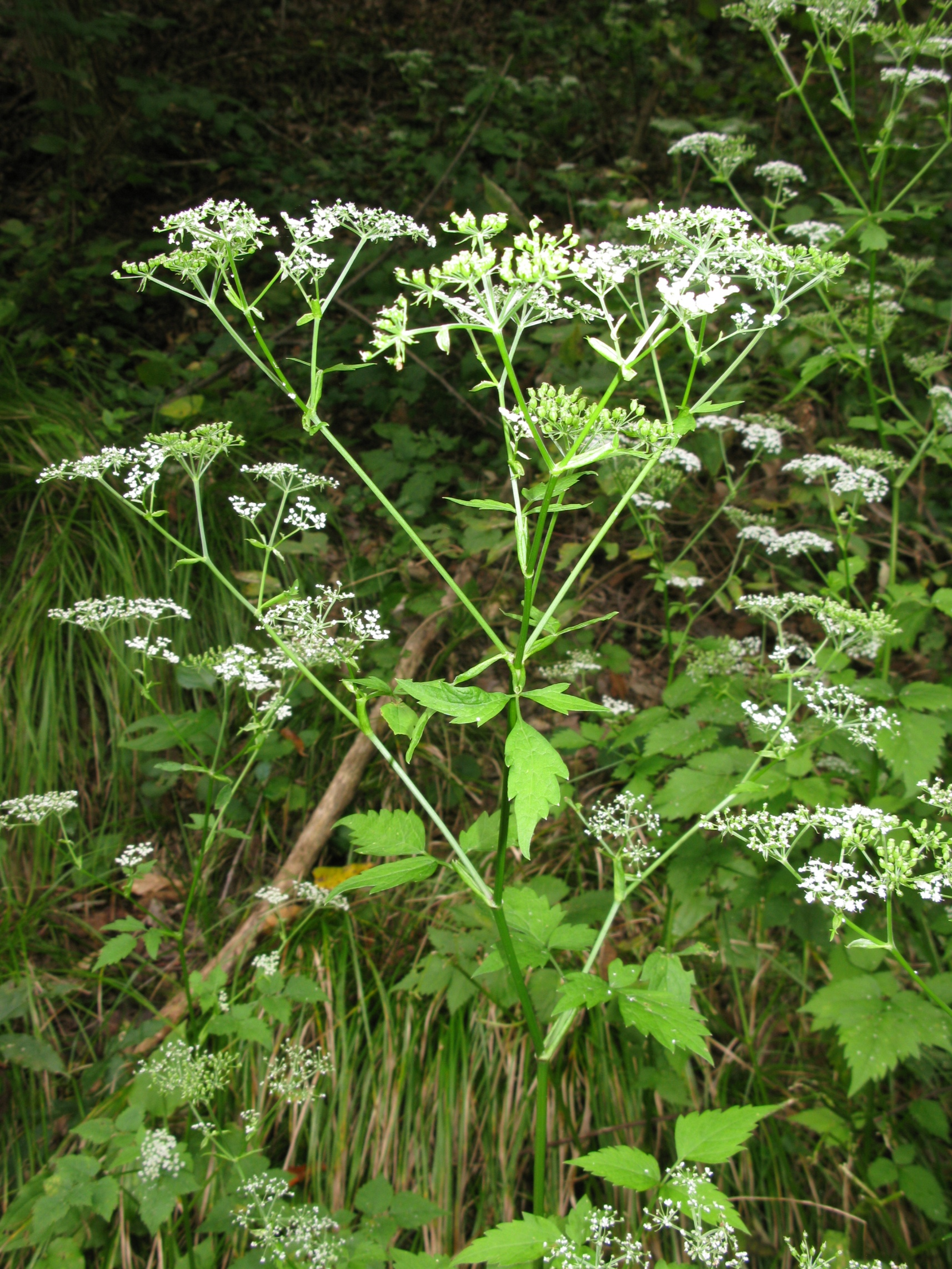
- Ostericum sieboldii

Scientific classification
- Kingdom: Plantae
- Clade: Tracheophytes
- Clade: Angiosperms
- Clade: Eudicots
- Clade: Asterids
- Order: Apiales
- Family: Apiaceae
- Subfamily: Apioideae
- Tribe: Selineae
- Genus: Ostericum; Hoffm.

= Ostericum =

Genus of plants

Ostericum is a genus of flowering plants belonging to the family Apiaceae.

Its native range is Temperate Eurasia.

Species:

- Ostericum atropurpureum G.Y.Li, G.H.Xia & W.Y.Xie
- Ostericum citriodorum (Hance) R.H.Shan & C.Q.Yuan
- Ostericum florenti (Franch. & Sav. ex Maxim.) Kitag.
- Ostericum grosseserratum (Maxim.) Kitag.
- Ostericum huadongense Z.H.Pan & X.H.Li
- Ostericum longipedicellatum (H.Wolff) Pimenov & Kljuykov
- Ostericum maximowiczii (F.Schmidt) Kitag.
- Ostericum palustre (Besser) Besser
- Ostericum scaberulum (Franch.) R.H.Shan & C.Q.Yuan
- Ostericum sieboldii (Miq.) Nakai
- Ostericum tenuifolium (Pall. ex Schult.) Y.C.Chu
