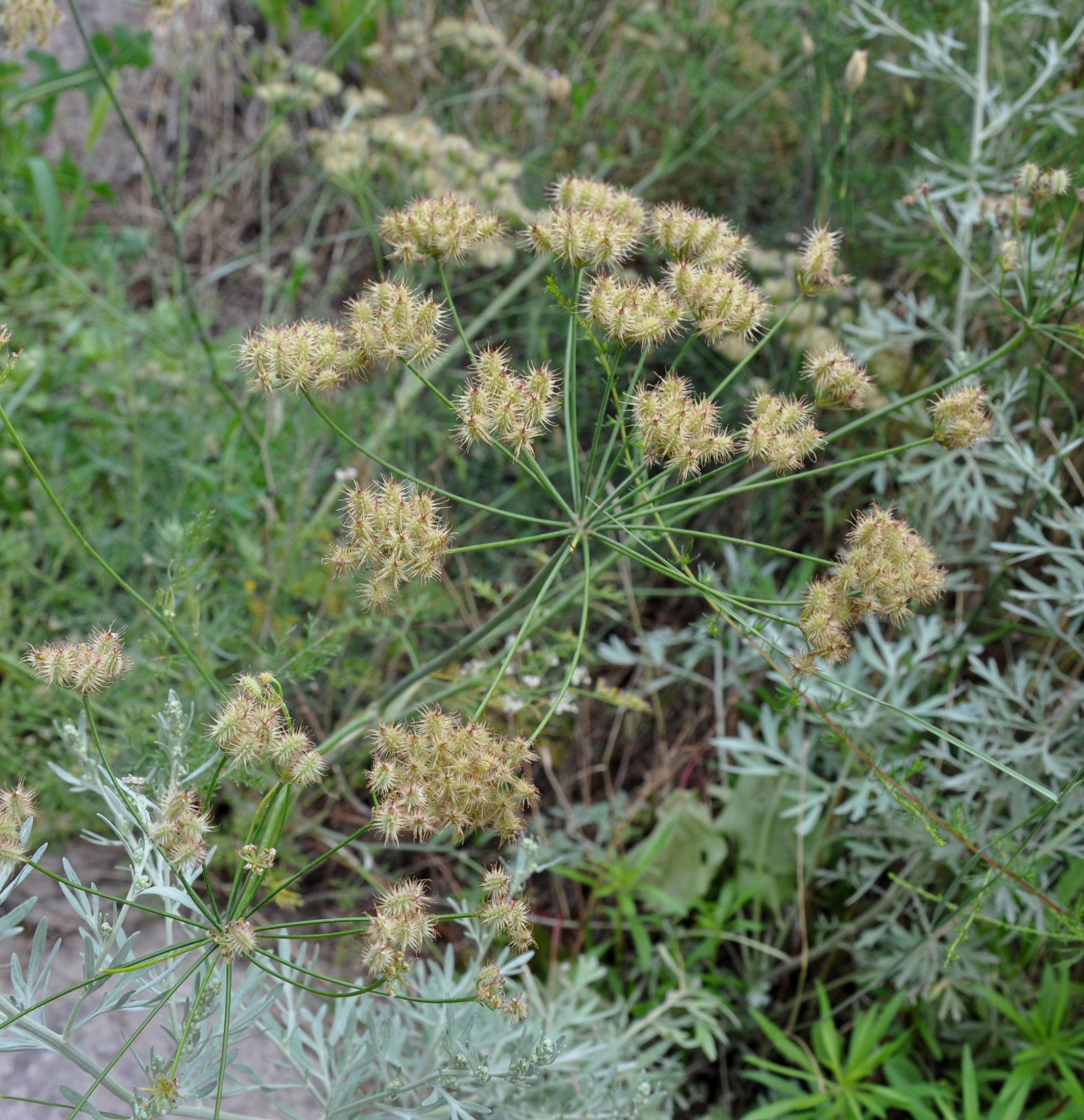

Scientific classification
- Kingdom: Plantae
- Clade: Tracheophytes
- Clade: Angiosperms
- Clade: Eudicots
- Clade: Asterids
- Order: Apiales
- Family: Apiaceae
- Subfamily: Apioideae
- Tribe: Scandiceae
- Subtribe: Torilidinae
- Genus: Astrodaucus; Drude (1898)

Species
- Astrodaucus littoralis (M.Bieb.) Drude; Astrodaucus orientalis (L.) Drude; Astrodaucus persicus (Boiss.) Drude

= Astrodaucus =

Genus of flowering plants

Astrodaucus is a genus of flowering plants in the family Apiaceae, with three species native to southeastern Europe, the Caucasus, and western Asia.

- Astrodaucus littoralis (M.Bieb.) Drude – Bulgaria, Romania, Ukraine, southern European Russia, and the Caucasus
- Astrodaucus orientalis (L.) Drude – Ukraine, Caucasus, and western Asia
- Astrodaucus persicus (Boiss.) Drude – Caucasus and Iran
