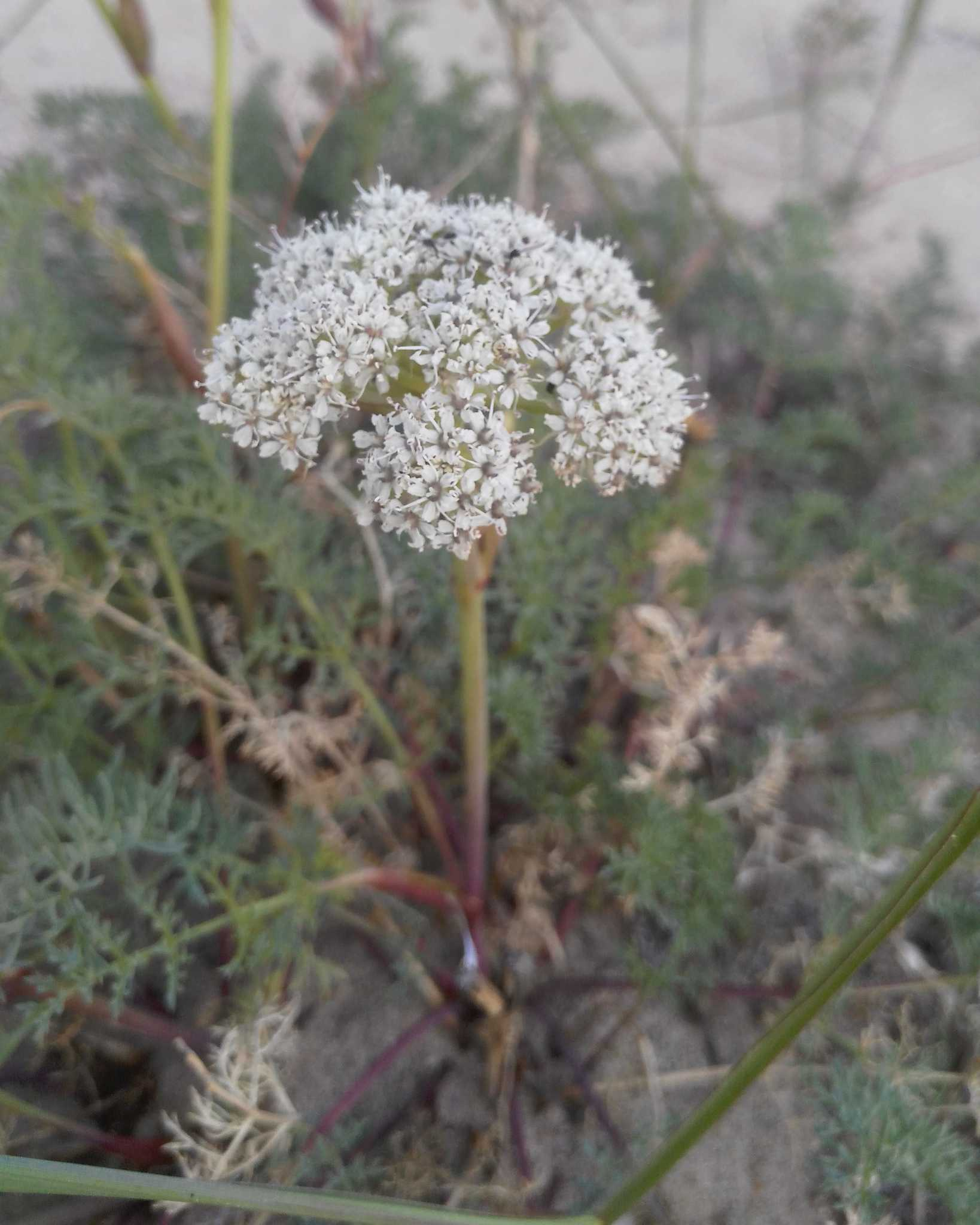
- Phlojodicarpus sibiricus

Scientific classification
- Kingdom: Plantae
- Clade: Tracheophytes
- Clade: Angiosperms
- Clade: Eudicots
- Clade: Asterids
- Order: Apiales
- Family: Apiaceae
- Subfamily: Apioideae
- Tribe: Selineae
- Genus: Phlojodicarpus; Turcz. ex Ledeb.

= Phlojodicarpus =

Genus of plants

Phlojodicarpus is a genus of flowering plants belonging to the family Apiaceae.

Its native range is from central Asia to the Russian Far East and northern China.

== Species ==
Species:

- Phlojodicarpus komarovii Gorovoj
- Phlojodicarpus sibiricus (Fisch.) Koso-Pol.
- Phlojodicarpus villosus (Turcz. ex Fisch. & C.A.Mey.) Turcz. ex Ledeb.
