= Masao Kitagawa =

Japanese botanist and pteridologist

Masao Kitagawa (北川 政夫, Kitagawa Masao, 1910–1995) was a Japanese botanist and pteridologist. He spent most of his academic career at Yokohama National University.

In 1986, a Russian botanist Michael Georgievich Pimenov published a genus of flowering plants, from central Asia, belonging to the family Apiaceae, as Kitagawia in his honour.
