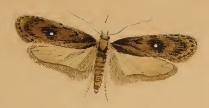

Scientific classification
- Kingdom: Animalia
- Phylum: Arthropoda
- Class: Insecta
- Order: Lepidoptera
- Family: Depressariidae
- Genus: Depressaria
- Species: D. albipunctella

Binomial name
- Depressaria albipunctella (Denis & Schiffermuller, 1775)

Synonyms
- Tinea albipunctella Denis & Schiffermuller, 1775; Agonopterix aegopodiella Hubner, 1825; albipuncta Haworth, 1828

= Depressaria albipunctella =

Species of moth

Depressaria albipunctella is a moth of the family Depressariidae. It is found in most of Europe, as well as in Libya.

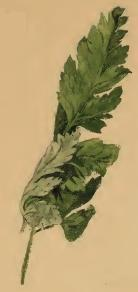
A leaf of Anthriscus sylvestris folded by larva

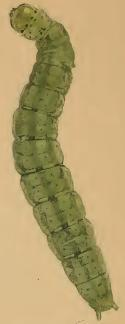
Larva

The wingspan is 19–22 mm. Adults are on wing from early August to late November and after hibernating again from March to May in one generation per year.

The larvae feed on Daucus, Conium, Torilis, Anthriscus, Chaerophyllum, Pimpinella and Seseli species. They live in a loose upper-surface silk spinning of a leaf of their host plant.
