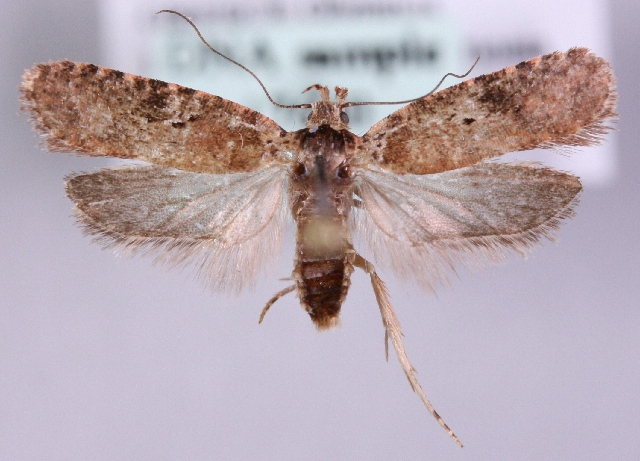

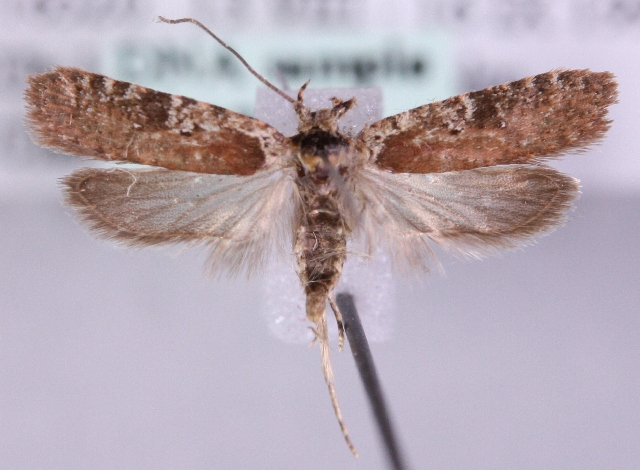

Scientific classification
- Kingdom: Animalia
- Phylum: Arthropoda
- Clade: Pancrustacea
- Class: Insecta
- Order: Lepidoptera
- Family: Depressariidae
- Genus: Agonopterix
- Species: A. purpurea

Binomial name
- Agonopterix purpurea (Haworth, 1811)

Synonyms
- Depressaria purpurea Haworth, 1811; Tinea vaccinella Hübner, [1813]

= Agonopterix purpurea =

Species of moth

Agonopterix purpurea is a moth of the family Depressariidae. It is found in most of Europe.

The wingspan is 13–15 mm. The head is grey, face white. Forewings are crimson-fuscous, mixed with dark fuscous and whitish, especially towards costa; base more whitish; first discal stigma black, posteriorly whitish-edged, preceded by a similar dot obliquely above it, second white, edged with dark fuscous; between and above these a dark fuscous blotch reaching costa. Hindwings light grey, darker posteriorly. The larva is yellowish; head and plate of 2 black

Adults are on wing from August to May or June.

The larvae feed on Anthriscus sylvestris, Chaerophyllum temulum, Daucus carota and Torilis japonica. The species overwinters as an adult. Pupation takes place in a cocoon in the earth.
