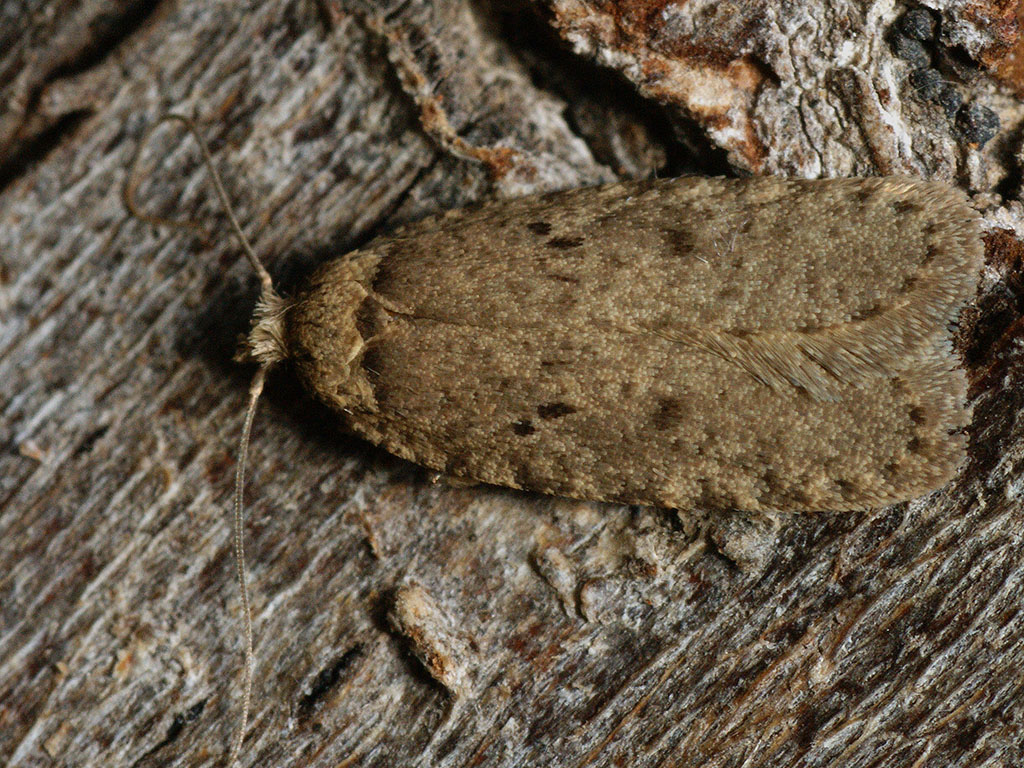

Scientific classification
- Kingdom: Animalia
- Phylum: Arthropoda
- Clade: Pancrustacea
- Class: Insecta
- Order: Lepidoptera
- Family: Depressariidae
- Genus: Agonopterix
- Species: A. curvipunctosa

Binomial name
- Agonopterix curvipunctosa (Haworth, 1811)

Synonyms
- Depressaria curvipunctosa Haworth, 1811; Tinea zephyrella Hubner, 1813; Depressaria granulosella Stainton, 1854; Depressaria amasina Mann, 1861; Depressaria turbulentella Glitz, 1863; Depressaria zephyrella var. littoralis Schawerda, 1921

= Agonopterix curvipunctosa =

Species of moth

Agonopterix curvipunctosa is a moth of the family Depressariidae. It is found in most of Europe, except Ireland, Portugal, Finland, the Baltic region and the western and southern part of the Balkan Peninsula.

The wingspan is 15–17 millimetres (0.59–0.67 in). Adults are on wing from mid August to May.

The larvae feed on Anthriscus caucalis, Anthriscus sylvestris, Chaerophyllum temulum, Angelica sylvestris, Angelica archangelica and Seseli libanotica. The species overwinters as an adult.
