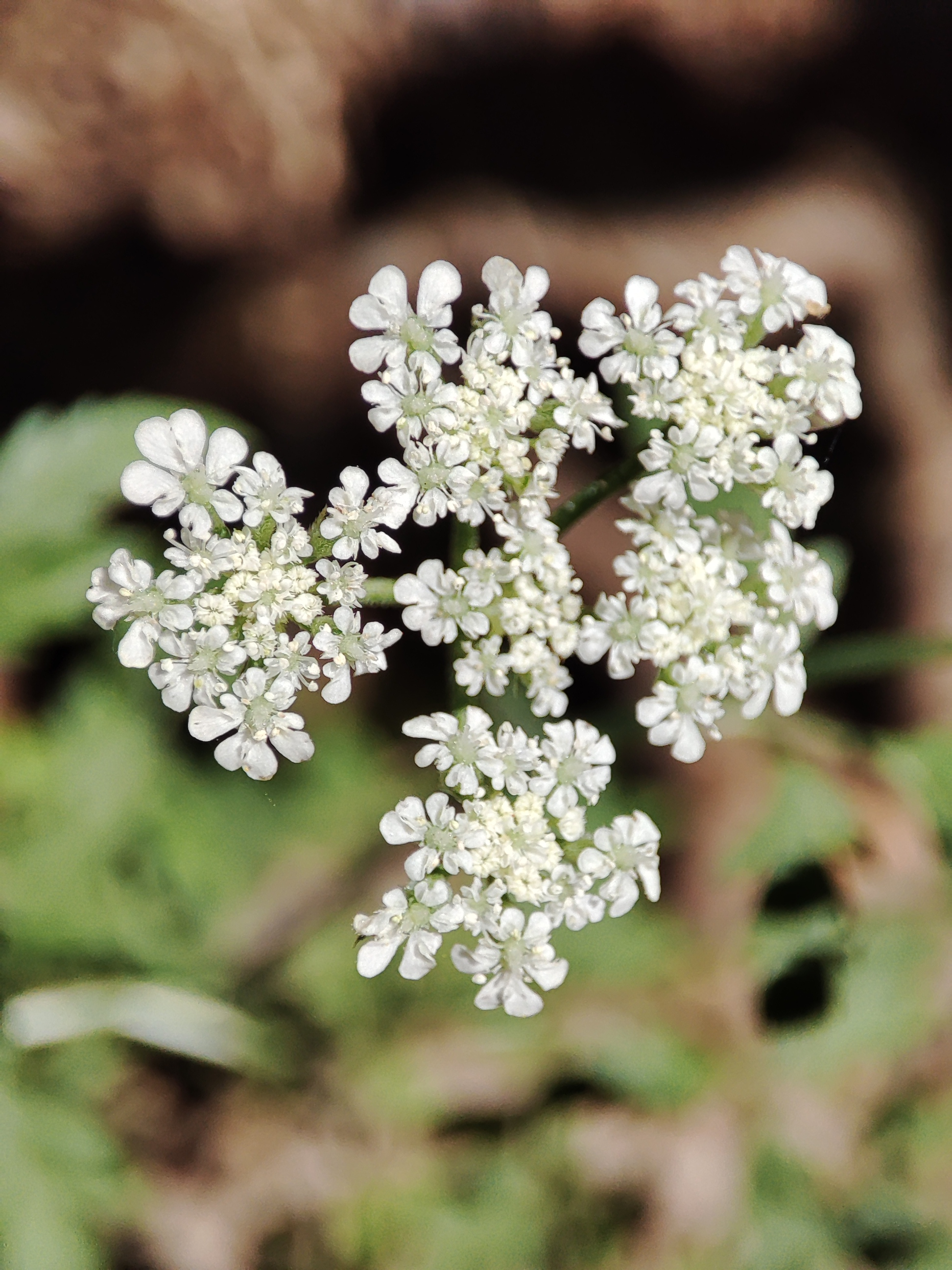
- Flowers

Scientific classification
- Kingdom: Plantae
- Clade: Tracheophytes
- Clade: Angiosperms
- Clade: Eudicots
- Clade: Asterids
- Order: Apiales
- Family: Apiaceae
- Genus: Torilis
- Species: T. arvensis

Binomial name
- Torilis arvensis (Huds.) Link

= Torilis arvensis =

Species of flowering plant

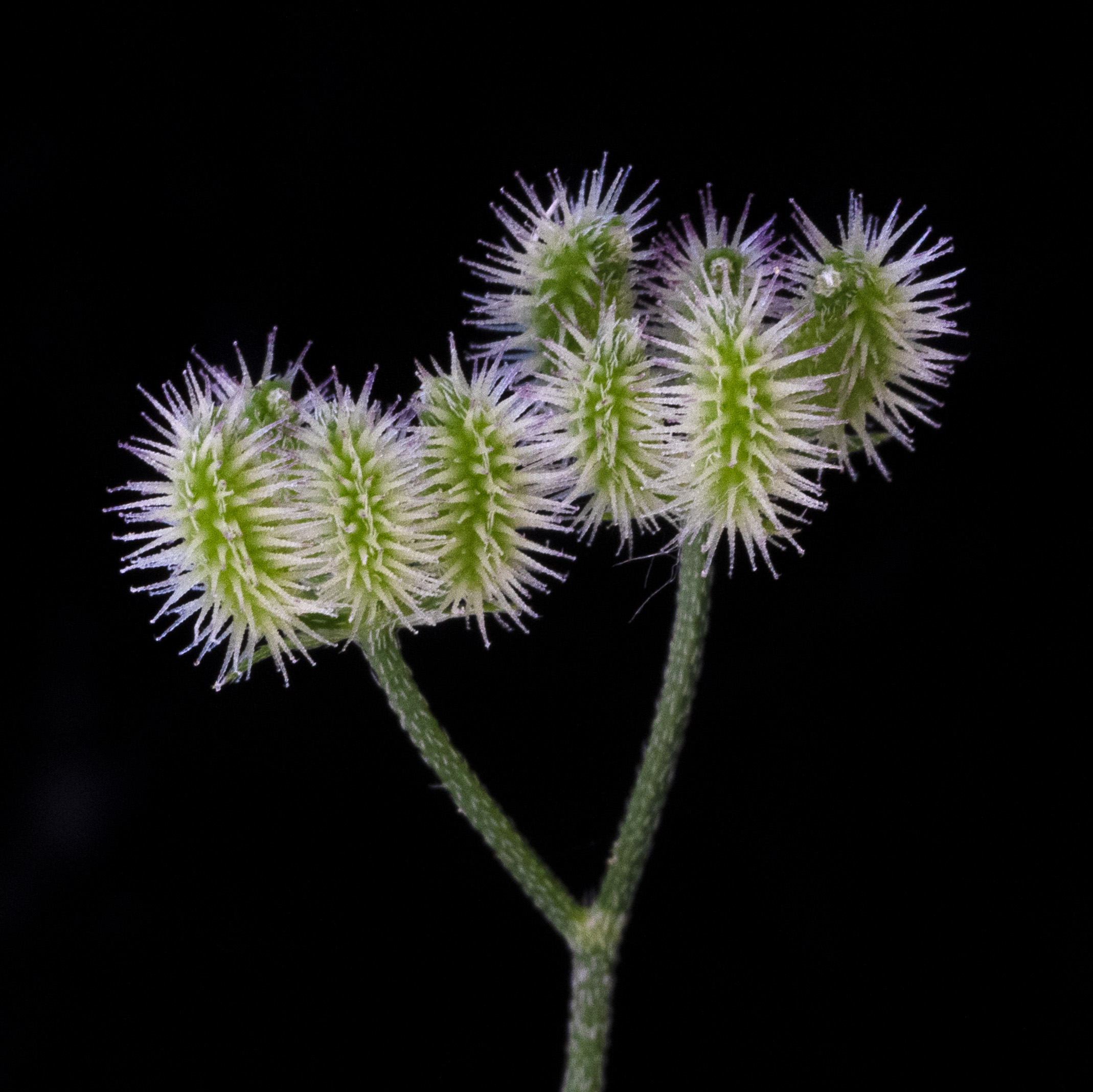
Fruits

Torilis arvensis is a species of flowering plant in the family Apiaceae known by the common names spreading hedge parsley, tall sock-destroyer and common hedge parsley. It is native to parts of Europe and it is known elsewhere, such as North America, as an introduced species and a common weed. It grows in many types of habitat, especially disturbed areas. It is an annual herb producing a slender, branching, rough-haired stem up to a meter in maximum height. The alternately arranged leaves are each divided into several pairs of lance-shaped leaflets up to 6 centimeters long each. The leaflet is divided or deeply cut into segments or teeth. The inflorescence is a wide open compound umbel of flower clusters on long, slender rays. Each flower has five petals which are unequal in size and are white with a pinkish or reddish tinge. Each greenish or pinkish fruit is 3 to 5 millimeters long and is coated in straight or curving prickles.
