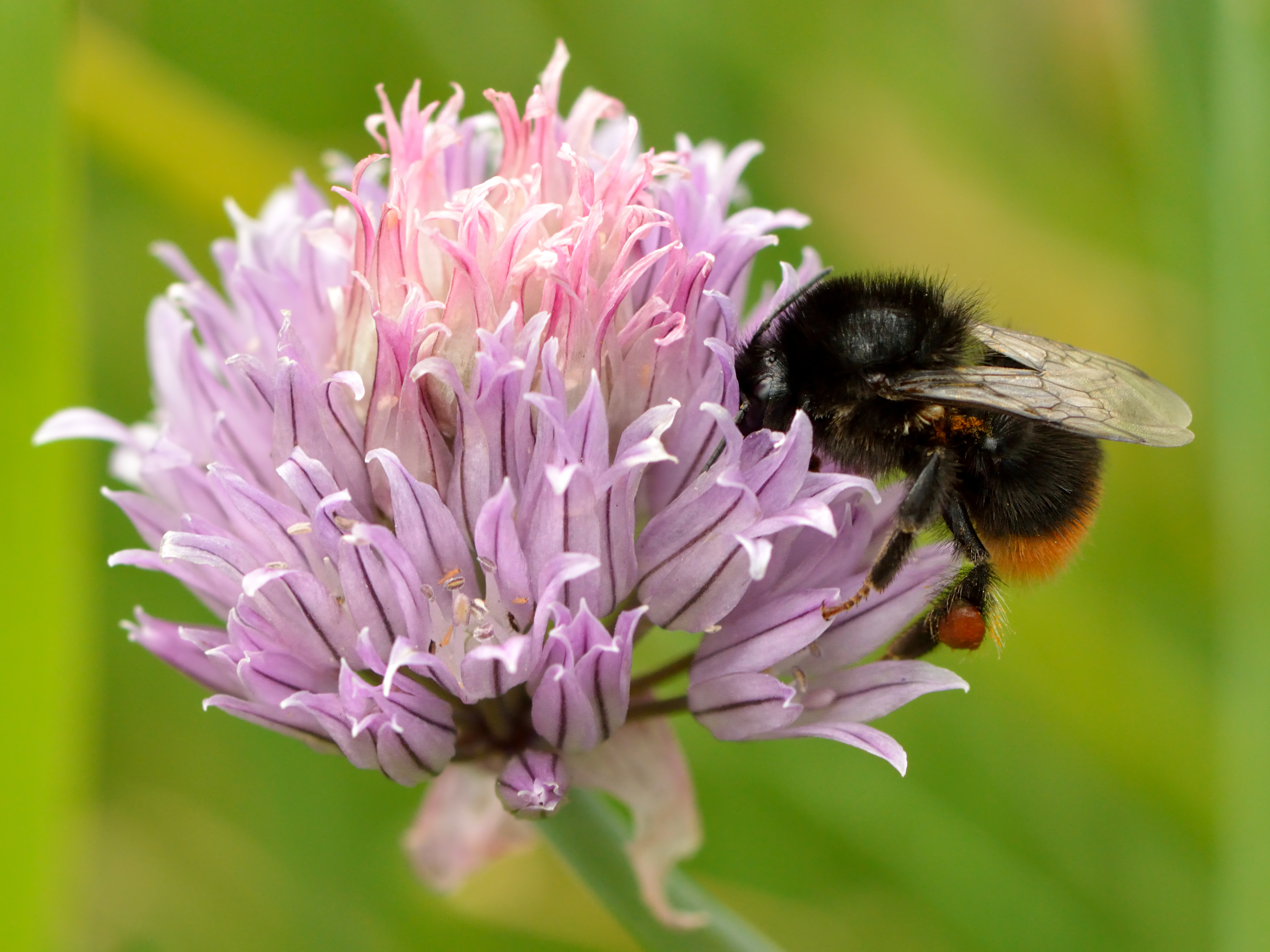

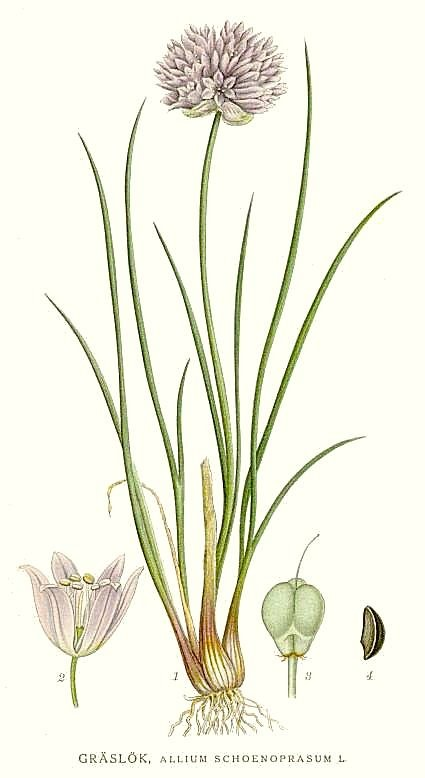

Conservation status
- Least Concern (IUCN 3.1)

Scientific classification
- Kingdom: Plantae
- Clade: Embryophytes
- Clade: Tracheophytes
- Clade: Angiosperms
- Clade: Monocots
- Order: Asparagales
- Family: Amaryllidaceae
- Subfamily: Allioideae
- Genus: Allium
- Species: A. schoenoprasum

Binomial name
- Allium schoenoprasum L.

Synonyms
- Synonymy: Cepa schoenoprasa (L.) Moench; Ascalonicum schoenoprasum (L.) P.Renault; Allium gredense Rivas Goday; Porrum schoenoprasum (L.) Schur; Schoenoprasum vulgare Fourr.; Allium sibiricum L.; Allium palustre Chaix; Allium tenuifolium Salisb.; Allium foliosum Clairv. ex DC.; Allium acutum Spreng.; Allium tenuifolium Pohl; Cepa tenuifolia (Salisb.) Gray; Allium reflexum F.Dietr.; Allium riparium Opiz; Allium carneum Schult. & Schult.f.; Allium alpinum (DC.) Hegetschw.; Allium broteri Kunth; Allium punctulatum Schltdl.; Porrum sibiricum (L.) Schur; Allium buhseanum Regel; Allium raddeanum Regel; Allium purpurascens Losa; Allium idzuense H.Hara; Allium udinicum Antsupova; Allium ubinicum Kotukhov

= Chives =

Species of flowering plant

Chives, scientific name Allium schoenoprasum, is a species of flowering plant in the family Amaryllidaceae.

A perennial plant, A. schoenoprasum is widespread in nature across much of Eurasia and North America. It is the only species of Allium native to both the New World and Old World.

The leaves and flowers are edible. Chives are a commonly used herb and vegetable with a variety of culinary uses. They are also used to repel insects.

== Description ==
Chives are a bulb-forming herbaceous perennial plant, growing to 25 centimetres (10 in) tall. The bulbs are slender, conical, 2–3 cm (3/4–1 1/4 in) long and 1 cm (1/2 in) broad, and grow in dense clusters from the roots. The scapes (or stems) are hollow and tubular, up to 50 cm (20 in) long and 2–3 mm (1/16–1/8 in) across, with a soft texture, although, prior to the emergence of a flower, they may appear stiffer than usual. The grass-like leaves, which are shorter than the scapes, are also hollow and tubular, or terete (round in cross-section).

The flowers are pale purple, and star-shaped with six petals, 1–2 cm (1/2–3/4 in) wide, and produced in a dense inflorescence of 10–30 together; before opening, the inflorescence is surrounded by a papery bract. The seeds are produced in a small, three-valved capsule, maturing in summer. The herb flowers from April to May in the southern parts of its habitat zones and in June in the northern parts.

Sometimes, the plants found in North America are classified as A. schoenoprasum var. sibiricum, although this is disputed. Differences between specimens are significant. One example was found in northern Maine growing solitary, instead of in clumps, also exhibiting dingy grey flowers.

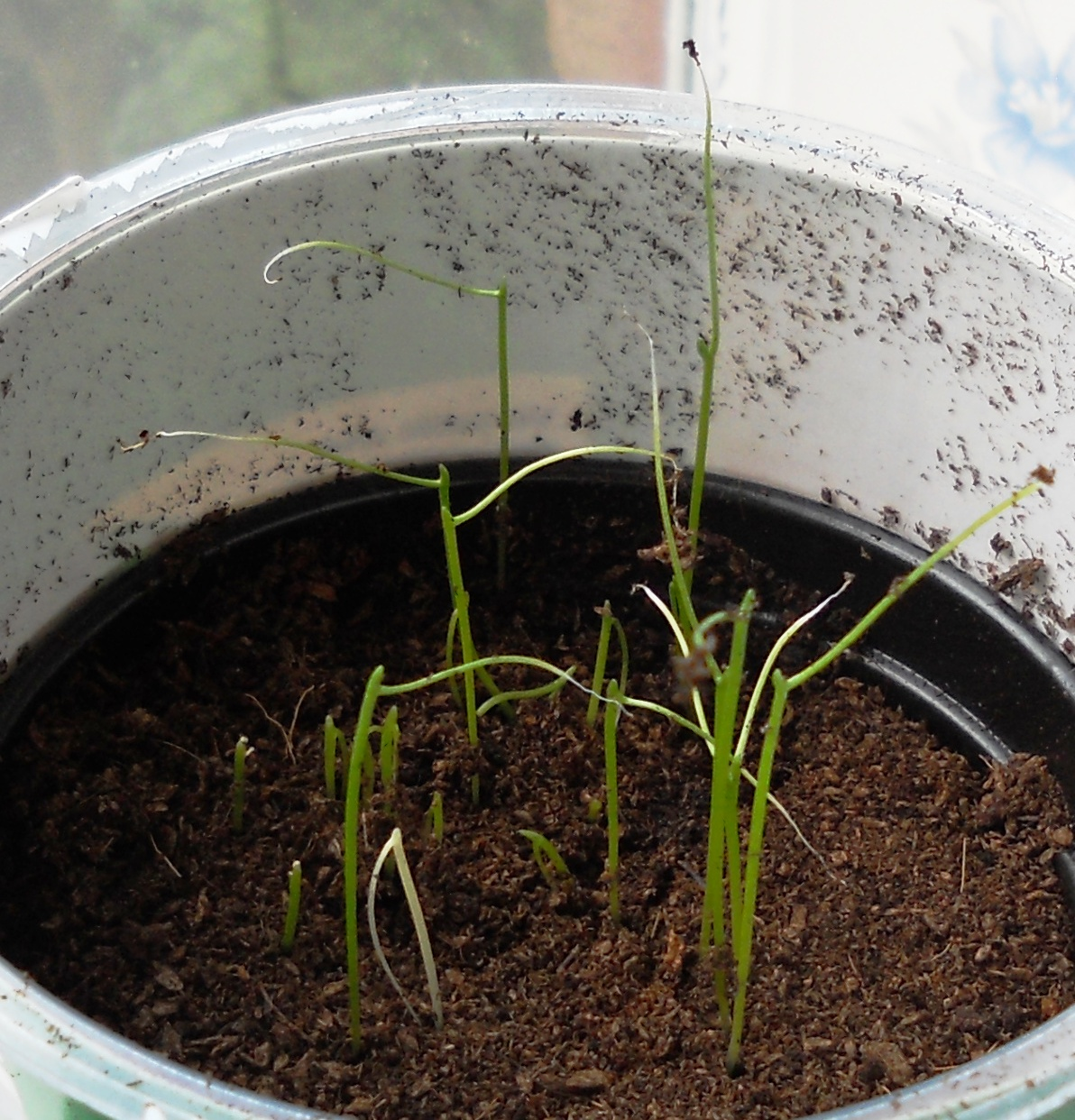
Seedlings

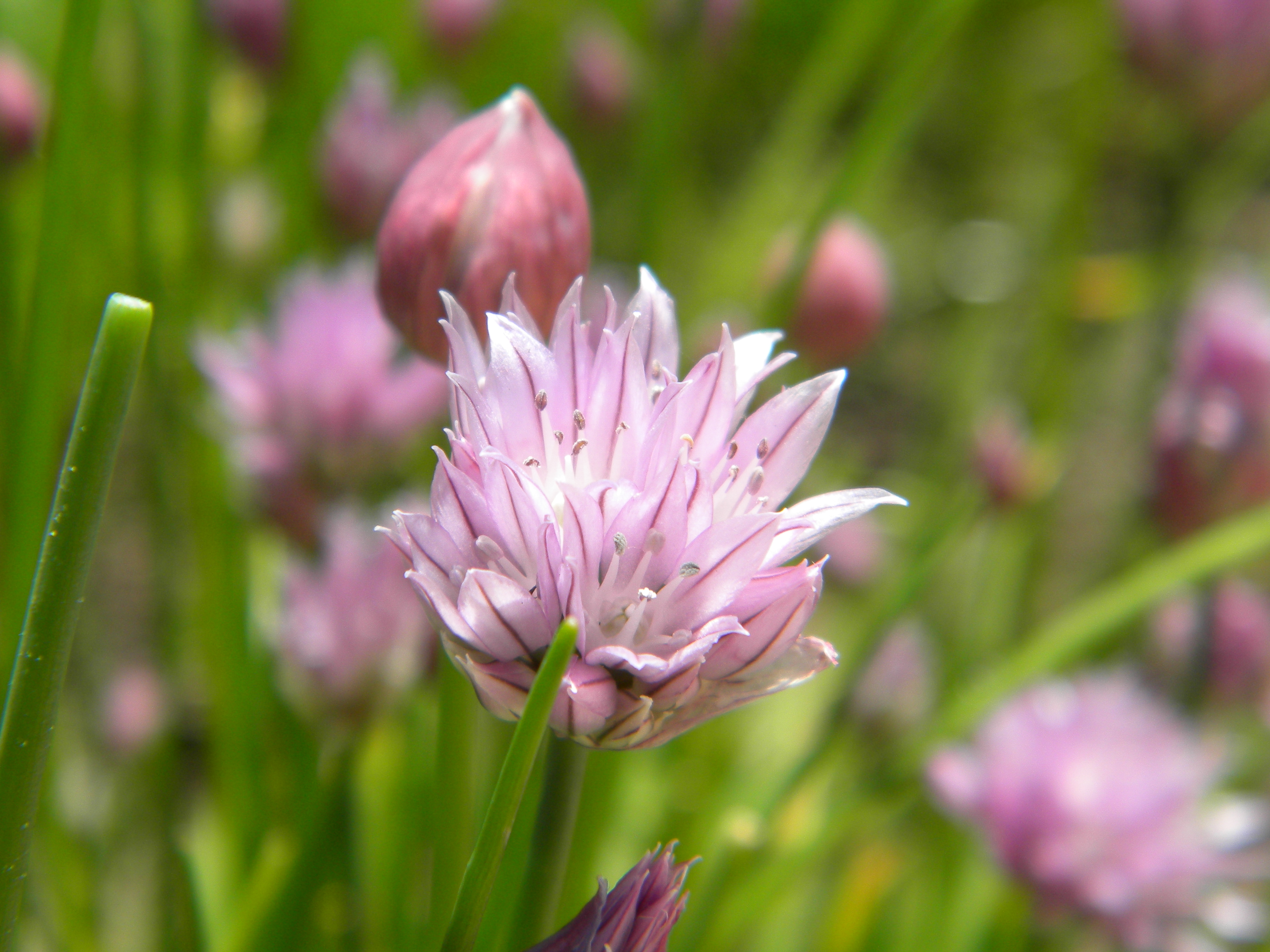
Flower with bud

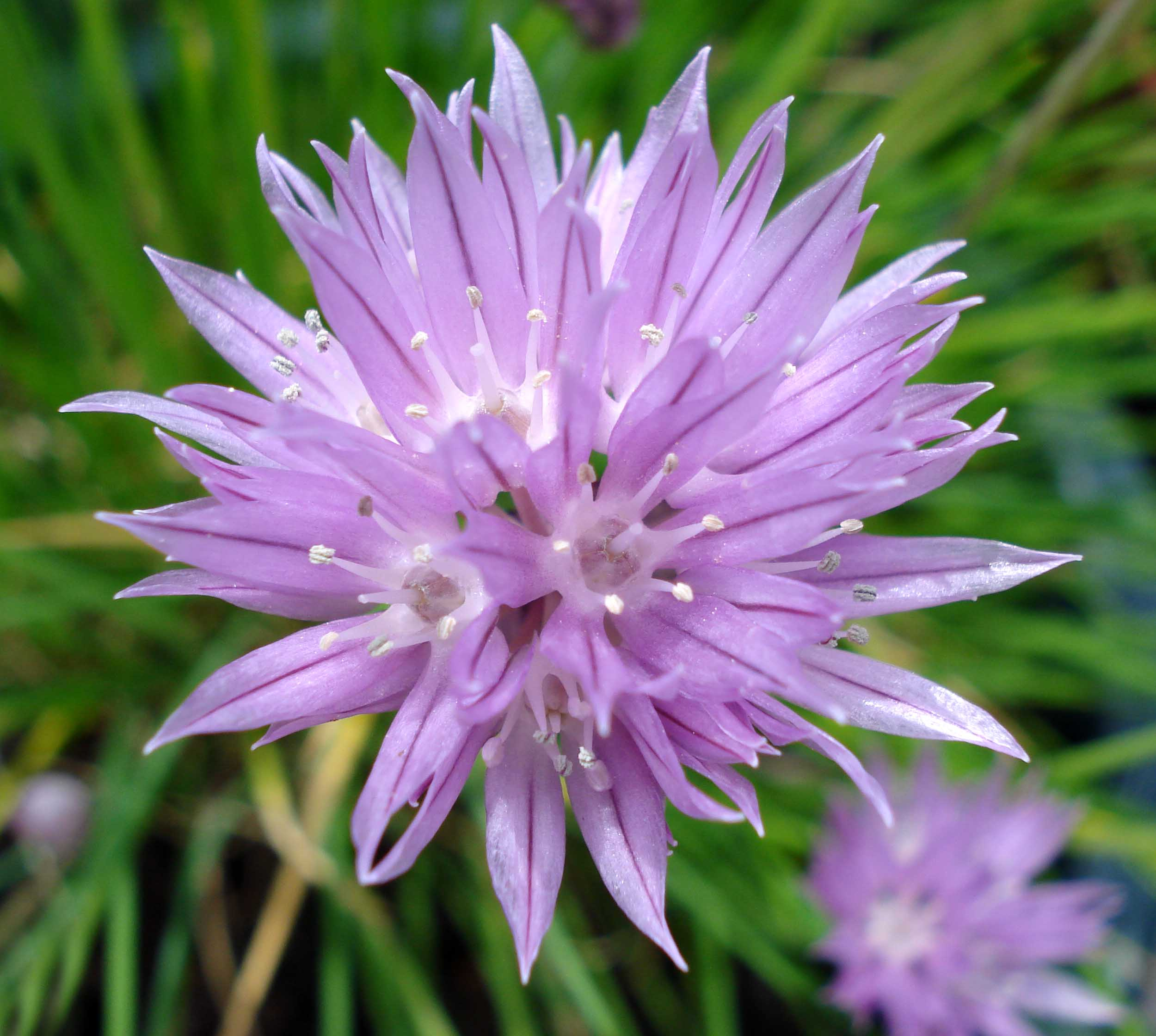
Fully open flower

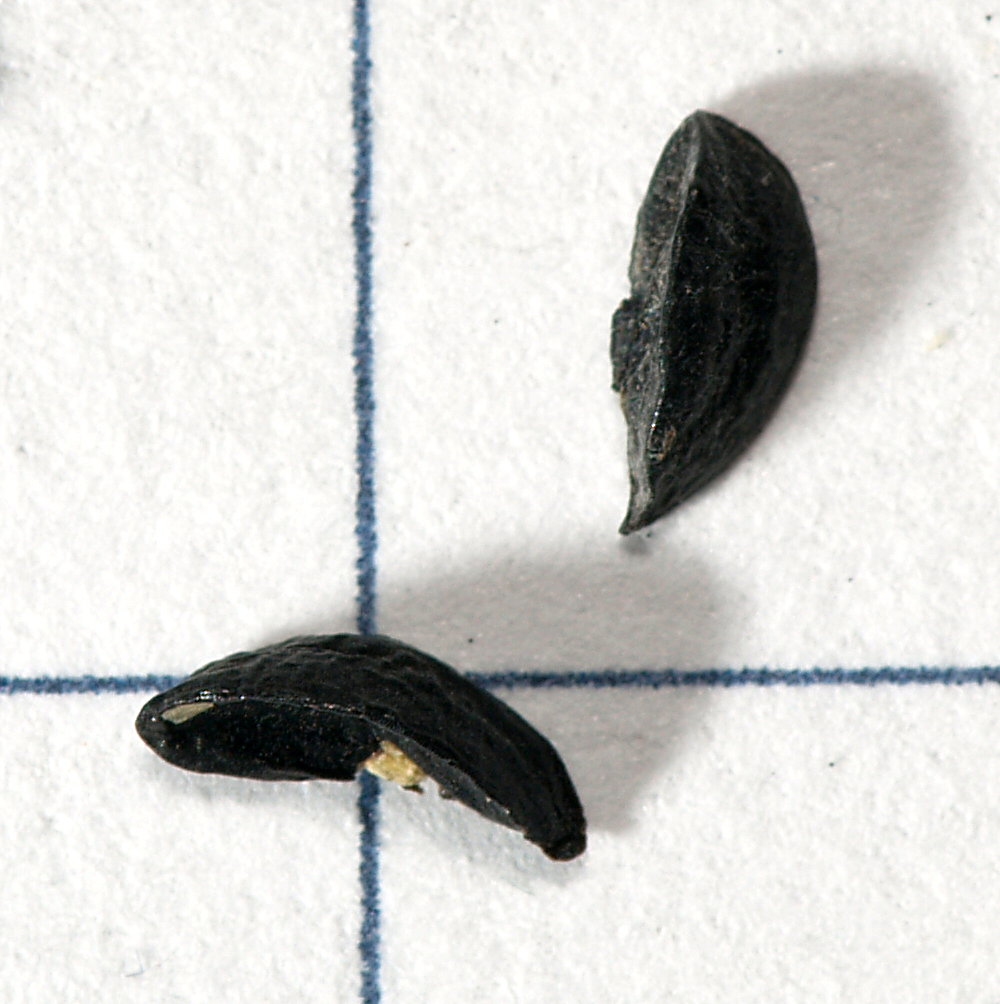
Seeds

=== Similar species ===
Close relatives of chives include common onions, garlic, shallot, leek, scallion, and Chinese onion.

The terete hollow leaves distinguish the plant from Allium tuberosum (garlic chives), which has the leaves flattened and strap-like.

== Taxonomy ==
It was formally described by the Swedish botanist Carl Linnaeus in his seminal publication Species Plantarum in 1753.

The name of the species derives from the Greek σχοίνος, skhoínos (sedge or rush) and πράσον, práson (leek). Its English name, chives, derives from the French word cive, from cepa, the Latin word for onion. In the Middle Ages, it was known as 'rush leek'.

Several subspecies have been proposed, but are not accepted by Plants of the World Online, as of July 2021, which sinks them into two subspecies:

- Allium schoenoprasum subsp. gredense (Rivas Goday) Rivas Mart., Fern.Gonz. & Sánchez Mata
- Allium schoenoprasum subsp. latiorifolium (Pau) Rivas Mart., Fern.Gonz. & Sánchez Mata

Varieties have also been proposed, including A. schoenoprasum var. sibiricum. The Flora of North America notes that the species is very variable, and considers recognition of varieties as "unsound".

== Distribution and habitat ==
Native to temperate areas of Europe, Asia and North America. chives are the only species of Allium native to both the New and the Old Worlds. It has a wide natural range across much of the Northern Hemisphere.

In Asia it is native from the Ural Mountains in Russia to Kamchatka in the far east. It grows natively in the Korean peninsula, but only the islands of Hokkaido and Honshu in Japan. Likewise its natural range in China only extends to Xinjiang and Inner Mongolia, though it is also found in adjacent Mongolia. It is native to all the nations of the Caucasus. However, in Central Asia it is only found in Kazakhstan and Kyrgyzstan. To the south its range also extends to Afghanistan, Iran, Iraq, Pakistan, and the Western Himalayas in India.

It is native to all parts of Europe with the exception of Sicily, Sardinia, the island of Cyprus, Iceland, Crimea, and Hungary and other offshore islands. It also is not native to Belgium and Ireland, but it grows there as an introduced plant.

In North America it is native to Alaska and almost every province of Canada, but has been introduced to the island of Newfoundland. In the United States the certain native range in the lower 48 is in two separated areas. In the west its range is in Washington, Oregon, Idaho, Montana, Wyoming, and Colorado. In the east it extends from Minnesota, eastward through Wisconsin, Michigan, Ohio, Pennsylvania, and New Jersey. Then northward into New York and all of New England. The Plants of the World Online database lists it as introduced to Illinois and Maryland and the USDA Natural Resources Conservation Service PLANTS database additionally lists it as growing in Nevada, Utah, Missouri, and Virginia without information on if it is native or introduced to those states.

In other areas of the Americas chives grow as an introduced plant in Mexico, Honduras, Costa Rica, Cuba, Jamaica, Hispaniola, Trinidad, Colombia, Bolivia, and the southern part of Argentina in Tierra del Fuego.

== Ecology ==
Chives are repulsive to most insects due to their sulfur compounds, but their flowers attract bees, and they are at times kept to increase desired insect life.

The plant provides a great deal of nectar for pollinators. It was rated in the top 10 for most nectar production (nectar per unit cover per year) in a United Kingdom plants survey conducted by the AgriLand project which is supported by the UK Insect Pollinators Initiative.

== Cultivation ==
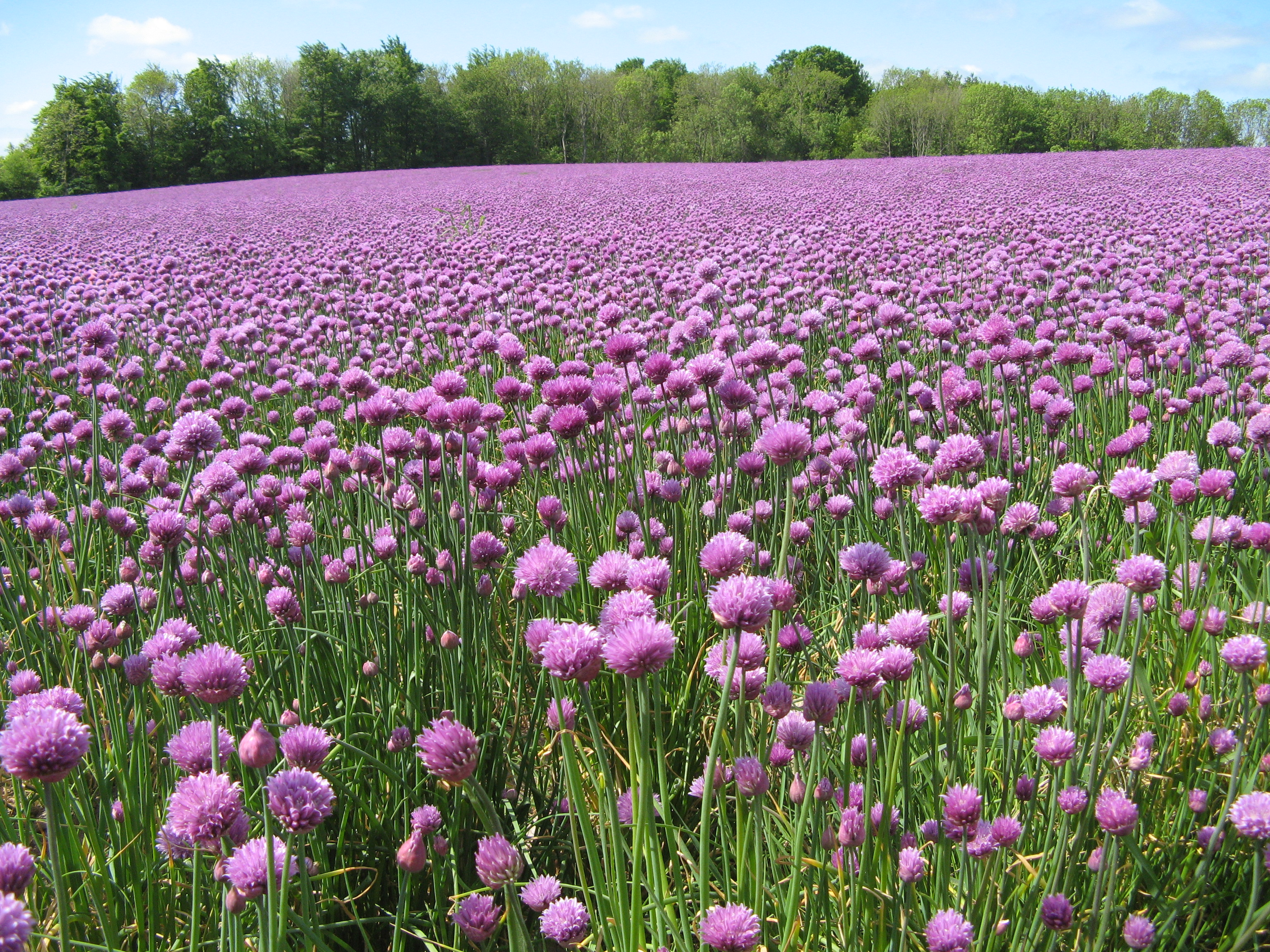
Field of chives

Chives have been cultivated in Europe since the Middle Ages (from the fifth until the 15th centuries), although their usage dates back 5,000 years.

Chives are cultivated both for their culinary uses and for their ornamental value; the violet flowers are often used in ornamental dry bouquets.

Chives thrive in well-drained soil, rich in organic matter, with a pH of 6–7 and full sun. They can be grown from seed and mature in summer, or early the following spring. Typically, chives need to be germinated at a temperature of 15 to 20 °C (59 to 68 °F) and kept moist. They can also be planted under a cloche or germinated indoors in cooler climates, then planted out later. After at least four weeks, the young shoots should be ready to be planted out. They are also easily propagated by division.

In cold regions, chives die back to the underground bulbs in winter, with the new leaves appearing in early spring. Chives starting to look old can be cut back to about 2–5 cm. When harvesting, the needed number of stalks should be cut to the base. During the growing season, the plant continually regrows leaves, allowing for a continuous harvest.

Chives are susceptible to damage by leek moth larvae, which bore into the leaves or bulbs of the plant.

Chives, raw
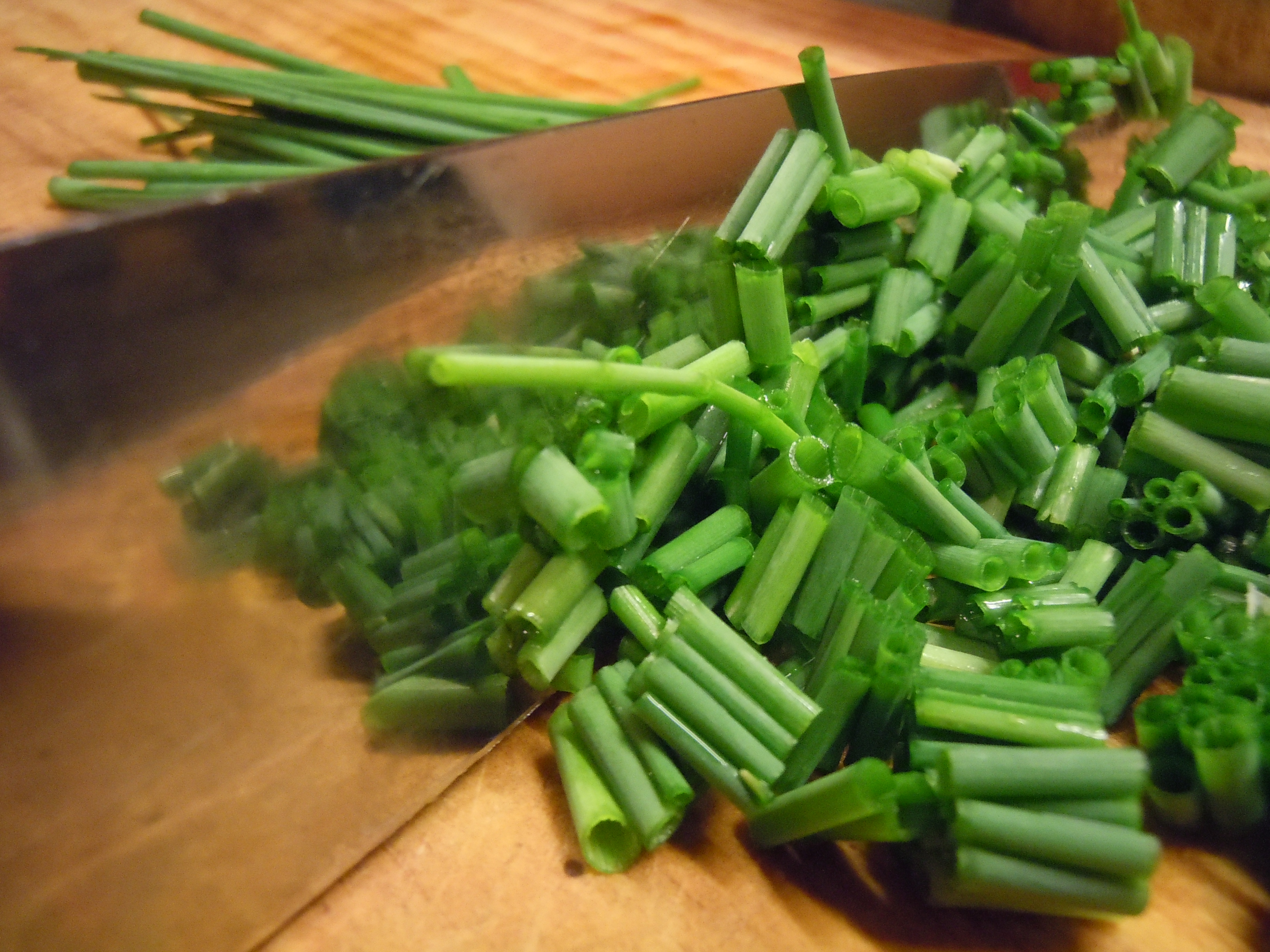
- Cut chive leaves as used for preparing food

Nutritional value per 100 g (3.5 oz)
- Energy: 126 kJ (30 kcal)
- Carbohydrates: 4.35 g
- Sugars: 1.85 g
- Dietary fiber: 2.5 g
- Fat: 0.73 g
- Protein: 3.27 g
Vitamins and minerals
Vitamins	Quantity %DV^{†}
Vitamin A equiv. beta-Carotene lutein zeaxanthin	24% 218 μg 24% 2612 μg 323 μg
Thiamine (B1)	7% 0.078 mg
Riboflavin (B2)	9% 0.115 mg
Niacin (B3)	4% 0.647 mg
Pantothenic acid (B5)	6% 0.324 mg
Vitamin B6	8% 0.138 mg
Folate (B9)	26% 105 μg
Vitamin C	65% 58.1 mg
Vitamin E	1% 0.21 mg
Vitamin K	177% 212.7 μg
Minerals	Quantity %DV^{†}
Calcium	7% 92 mg
Iron	9% 1.6 mg
Magnesium	10% 42 mg
Manganese	16% 0.373 mg
Phosphorus	5% 58 mg
Potassium	10% 296 mg
Zinc	5% 0.56 mg
- Link to USDA Database entry
- ^{†}Percentages estimated using US recommendations for adults, except for potassium, which is estimated based on expert recommendation from the National Academies.

== Uses ==
=== Culinary arts ===
Chives are grown for their scapes and leaves, which are used for culinary purposes as a flavoring herb, and provide a somewhat milder onion-like flavor than those of other Allium species. The edible flowers are used in salads, or used to make blossom vinegars. Both the scapes and the unopened, immature flower buds are diced and used as an ingredient for omelettes, fish, potatoes, soups, and many other dishes. The scapes are often paired with cream cheese.

Chives have a wide variety of culinary uses, such as in traditional dishes in France, Sweden, and elsewhere. In his 1806 book Attempt at a Flora (Försök til en flora), Anders Jahan Retzius describes how chives are used with pancakes, soups, fish, and sandwiches. They are also an ingredient of the gräddfil sauce with the traditional herring dish served at Swedish midsummer celebrations. The flowers and scapes may also be used to garnish dishes.

In Poland and Germany, chives are served with quark. Chives are one of the fines herbes of French cuisine, the others being tarragon, chervil and parsley. Chives can be found fresh at most markets year-round, making them readily available; they can also be dry-frozen without much impairment to the taste, giving home growers the opportunity to store large quantities harvested from their own gardens.

=== Uses in plant cultivation ===
Retzius also describes how farmers would plant chives between the rocks making up the borders of their flowerbeds, to keep the plants free from pests (such as Japanese beetles). The growing plant repels unwanted insect life, and the juice of the leaves can be used for the same purpose, as well as fighting fungal infections, mildew, and scab.

== In culture ==
In Europe, chives were sometimes referred to as "rush leeks".

It was mentioned in 80 A.D. by Marcus Valerius Martialis in his "Epigrams" (13.18 porri sectivi):

Fila Tarentini graviter redolentia porri
Edisti quoties, oscula clausa dato.
(After eating the heavily scented threads of Tarentine leek, give your kisses closed.)

The Romans believed chives could relieve the pain from sunburn or a sore throat. They believed eating chives could increase blood pressure and act as a diuretic.

Romani have used chives in fortune telling. Bunches of dried chives hung around a house were believed to ward off disease and evil.

In the 19th century, Dutch farmers fed cattle on the herb to give a different taste to their milk.
