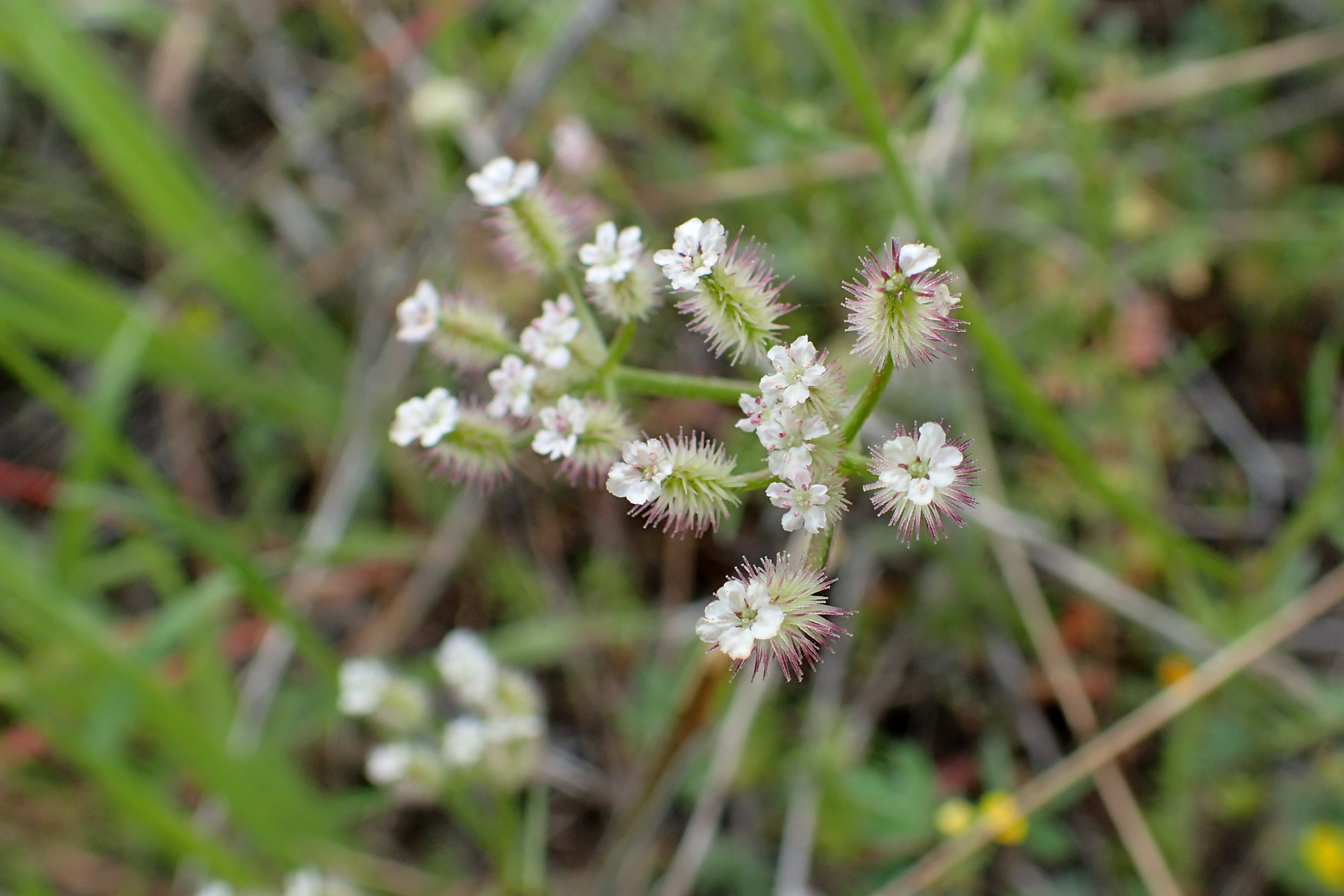

Scientific classification
- Kingdom: Plantae
- Clade: Tracheophytes
- Clade: Angiosperms
- Clade: Eudicots
- Clade: Asterids
- Order: Apiales
- Family: Apiaceae
- Genus: Torilis
- Species: T. leptophylla

Binomial name
- Torilis leptophylla (L.) Rchb.f.

= Torilis leptophylla =

Species of plant

Torilis leptophylla is a species of hedge parsleys in the Apiaceae known as bristlefruit hedgeparsley.
