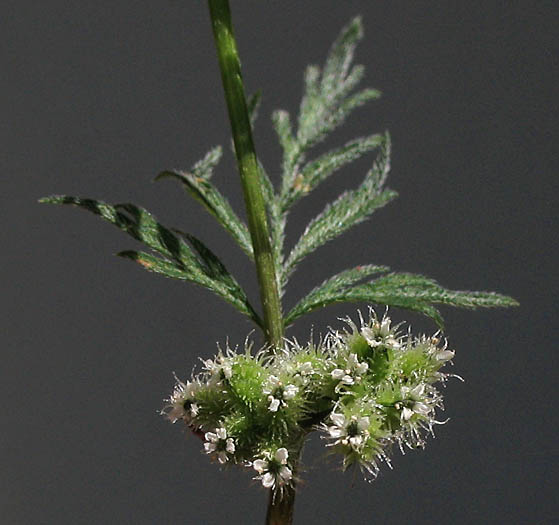

Scientific classification
- Kingdom: Plantae
- Clade: Tracheophytes
- Clade: Angiosperms
- Clade: Eudicots
- Clade: Asterids
- Order: Apiales
- Family: Apiaceae
- Genus: Torilis
- Species: T. nodosa

Binomial name
- Torilis nodosa (L.) Gaertn.

= Torilis nodosa =

Species of flowering plant

Torilis nodosa is a species of flowering plant in the family Apiaceae known by the common names knotted hedgeparsley and short sock-destroyer. It is native to parts of Europe, especially the Mediterranean Basin and it is known elsewhere, such as North America, as an introduced species and a common weed. It grows in many types of habitat, particularly disturbed areas. It is an annual herb producing a hairy stem up to half a meter in maximum height. The alternately arranged leaves are each divided into several pairs of smooth-edged lance-shaped or linear leaflets. The inflorescence is a dense compound umbel of flower clusters on very short rays, often appearing like a cluster. Each flower has five petals which are unequal in size and are white with a pinkish or reddish tinge. Each greenish or pinkish fruit is about 3 millimeters long and is coated in long prickles.
