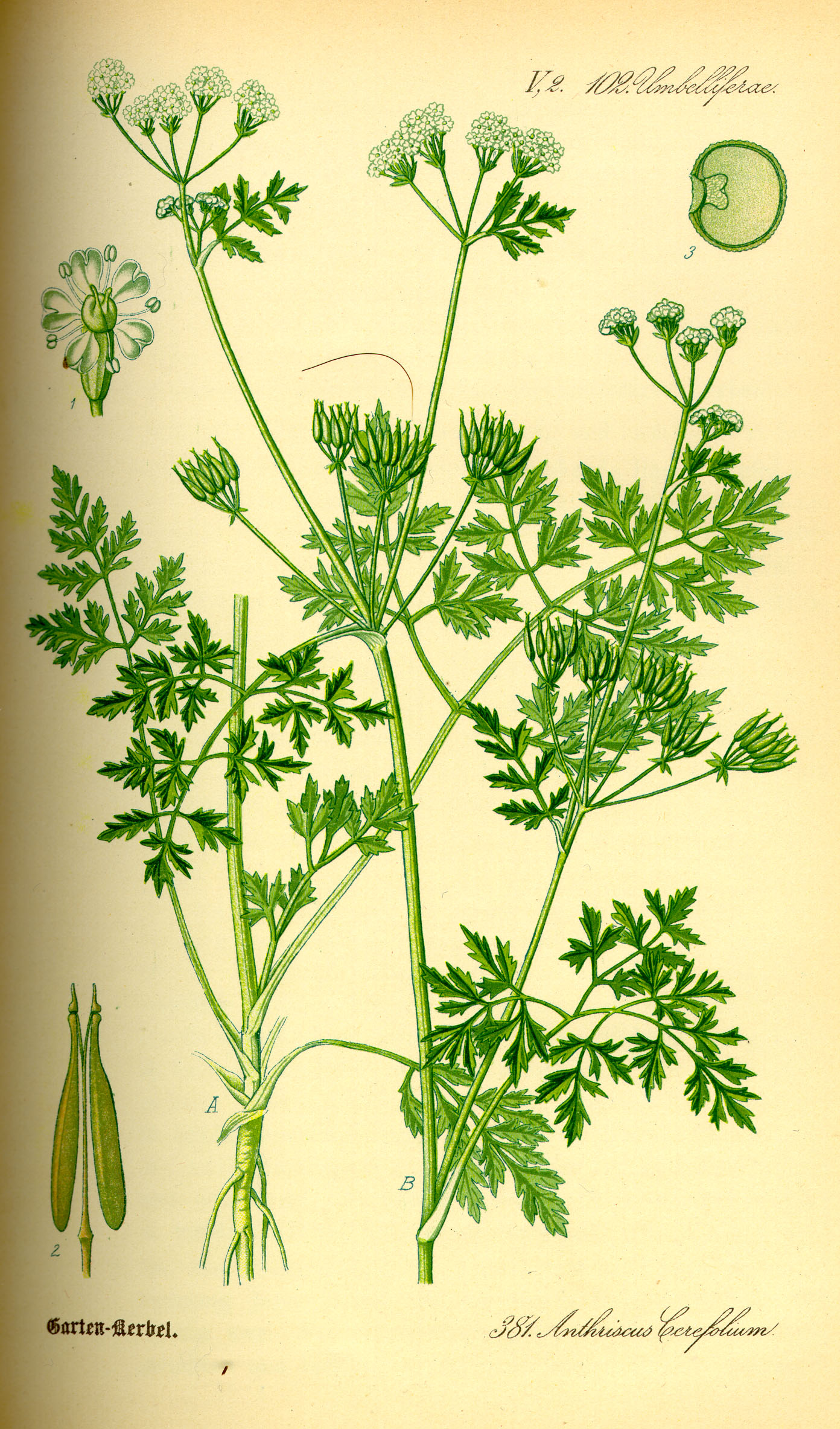

Scientific classification
- Kingdom: Plantae
- Clade: Tracheophytes
- Clade: Angiosperms
- Clade: Eudicots
- Clade: Asterids
- Order: Apiales
- Family: Apiaceae
- Genus: Anthriscus
- Species: A. cerefolium

Binomial name
- Anthriscus cerefolium (L.) Hoffm.

Synonyms
- Anthriscus chaerophyllus St.-Lag.; Anthriscus longirostris Bertol.; Anthriscus sativa Besser; Anthriscus trachysperma Rchb. ex Nyman; Cerefolium sativum Besser; Cerefolium sylvestre Besser; Cerefolium trichospermum Besser; Chaerefolium cerefolium (L.) Schinz; Chaerefolium trichospermum (Schinz & Thell.) Stankov; Chaerophyllum cerefolium (L.) Crantz; Chaerophyllum nemorosum Lag. ex DC.; Chaerophyllum sativum Lam.; Myrrhodes cerefolium (L.) Kuntze; Scandix cerefolium L.; Selinum cerefolium (L.) E.H.L.Krause

= Chervil =

Species of plants

Chervil (/ˈtʃɜːrˌvɪl/; Anthriscus cerefolium), sometimes called French parsley or garden chervil (to distinguish it from similar plants also called chervil), is a delicate annual herb related to parsley. It was formerly called myrhis due to its volatile oil with an aroma similar to the resinous substance myrrh. It is commonly used to season mild-flavoured dishes and is a constituent of the French herb mixture fines herbes.

== Name ==
The name chervil is from Anglo-Norman, from Latin chaerephylla or choerephyllum, meaning "leaves of joy"; the Latin is formed, as from an Ancient Greek word χαιρέφυλλον (chairephyllon).

== Description ==
The plants grow to 40–70 cm (16–28 in), with tripinnate leaves that may be curly. The small white flowers form small umbels, 2.5–5 cm (1–2 in) across. The fruit is about 1 cm long, oblong-ovoid with a slender, ridged beak.

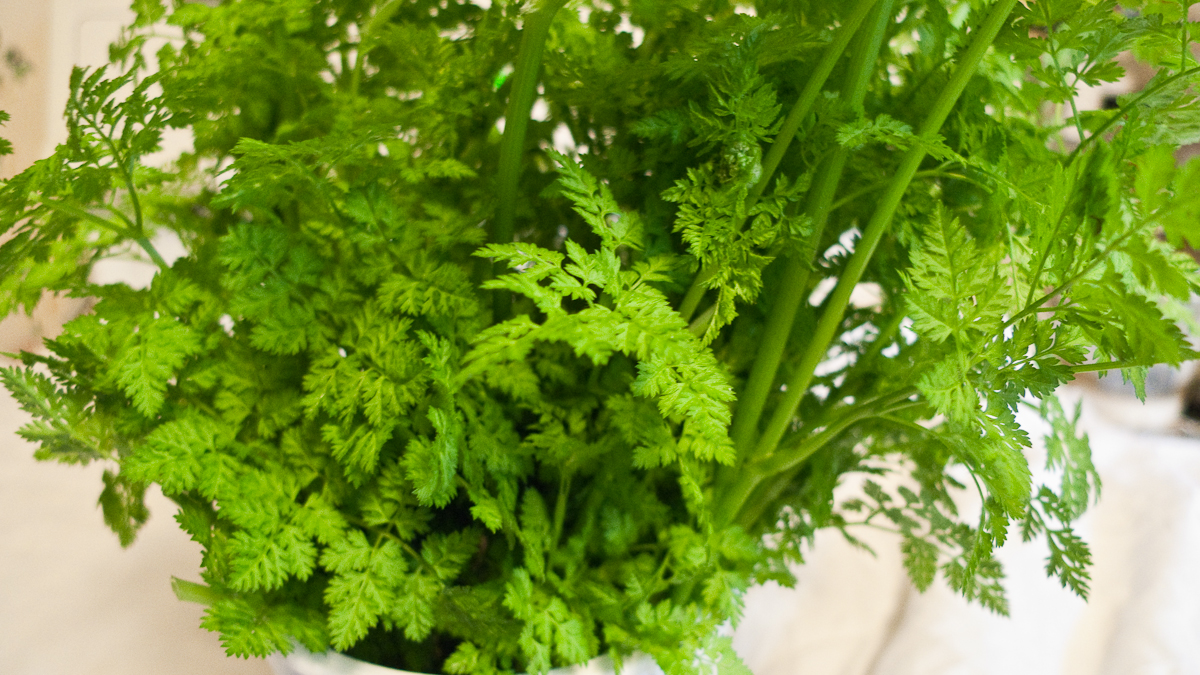
Fresh chervil

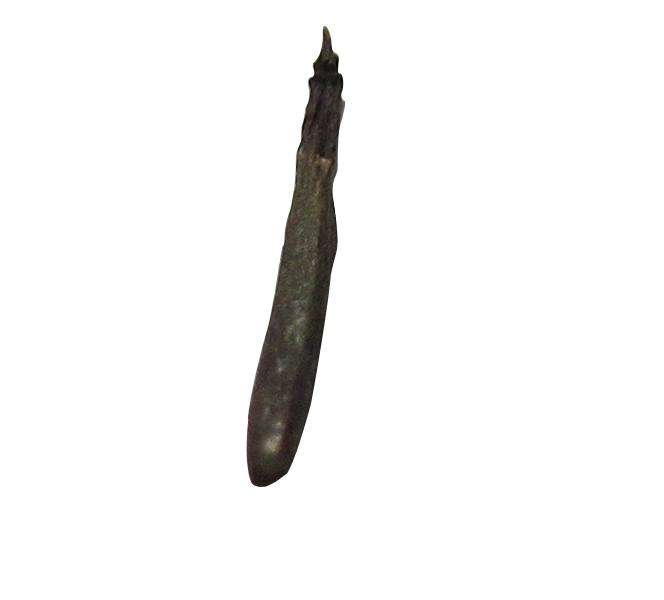
Seed

== Distribution and habitat ==
A member of the Apiaceae, the native distribution of chervil is uncertain due to its long history of cultivation, particularly by the Romans. The New Oxford Book of Food Plants limits its native range to the Caucasus, while Plants of the World Online cites it with a wider native range across central and southeastern Europe and southwestern Asia from Switzerland in the west, to Iran in the east.

The species is now naturalised through most of Europe and North Africa. It is also introduced and frequently grown in North America, where it is naturalised in many areas. These escapes differ from other Anthriscus species growing in North America (A. caucalis and A. sylvestris) by having lanceolate-linear bracteoles and a fruit with a relatively long beak.

== Cultivation ==
Transplanting chervil can be difficult, due to the long taproot. It prefers a cool and moist location; otherwise, it rapidly goes to seed (also known as bolting). It is usually grown as a cool-season crop, like lettuce, being planted in early spring and late fall or in a winter greenhouse. Regular harvesting of leaves also reduces bolting. If plants bolt despite precautions, new seeds can be periodically re-sown throughout the growing season, thus producing fresh plants as older plants bolt and go out of production.

== Uses ==
=== Culinary ===
Chervil is used, particularly in France, to season poultry, seafood, young spring vegetables (such as carrots), soups, and sauces. More delicate than parsley, it has a faint taste of liquorice or aniseed. It is used by some cooks as a garnish.

Chervil is one of the four traditional French fines herbes, along with tarragon, chives, and parsley, which are essential to French cooking. Unlike the more pungent, robust herbs such as thyme and rosemary, which can take prolonged cooking, the fines herbes are added at the last minute, to salads, omelettes, and soups.

=== Chemical constituents ===
Essential oil obtained via water distillation of wild Turkish Anthriscus cerefolium was analyzed by gas chromatography–mass spectrometry identifying 4 compounds: methyl chavicol (83.10%), 1-allyl-2,4-dimethoxybenzene (15.15%), undecane (1.75%) and β-pinene (<0.01%).

=== Horticulture ===
According to some, slugs are attracted to chervil and the plant is sometimes used to bait them.

=== Health ===
Chervil has had various uses in folk medicine. It was claimed to be useful as a digestive aid, for lowering high blood pressure, and, infused with vinegar, for curing hiccups. Besides its digestive properties, it is used as a mild stimulant.

Chervil has also been implicated in "strimmer dermatitis", another name for phytophotodermatitis, due to spray from weed trimmers and similar forms of contact. Other plants in the family Apiaceae can have similar effects.
