= Fines herbes =

Combination of herbs

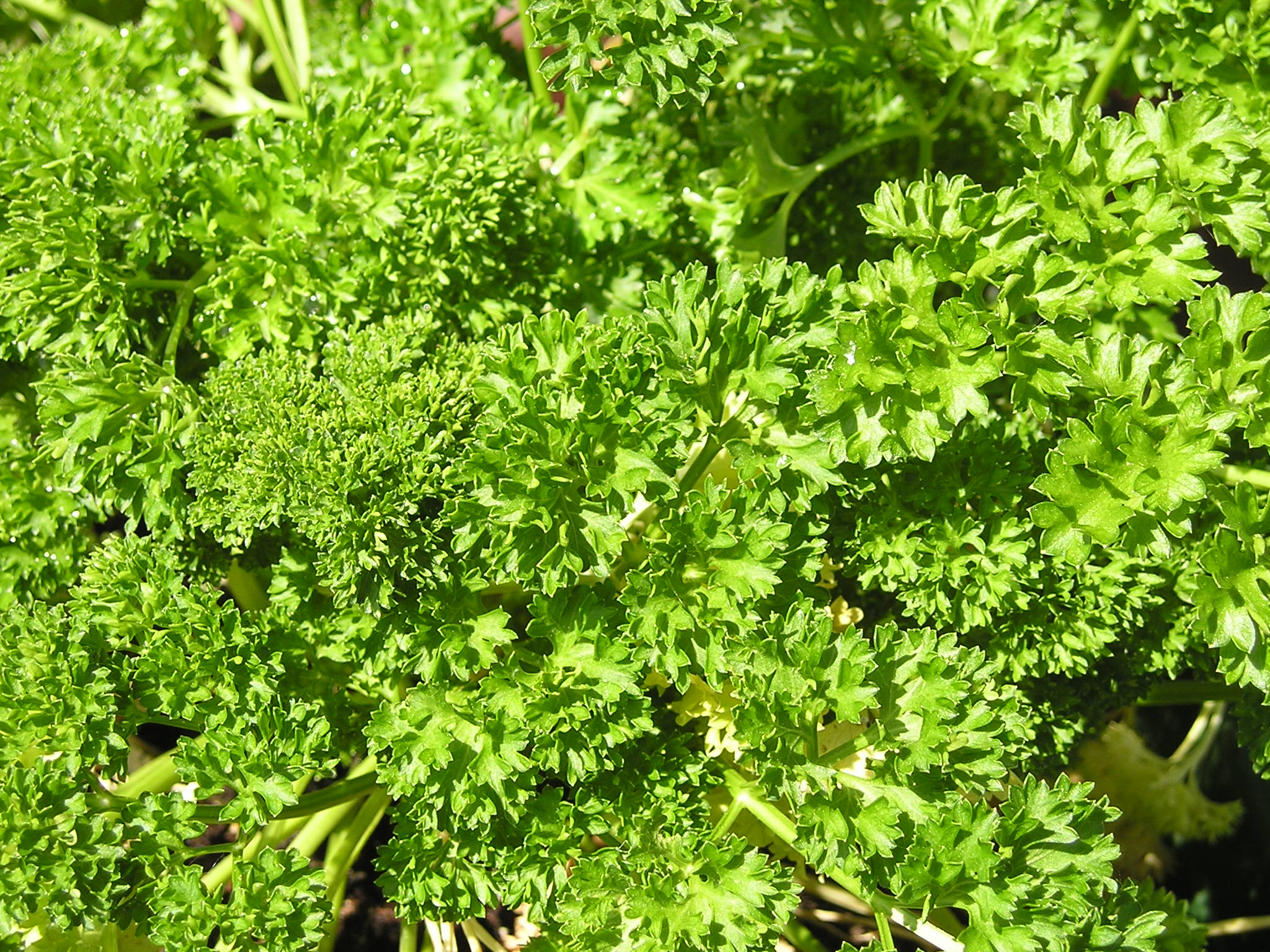
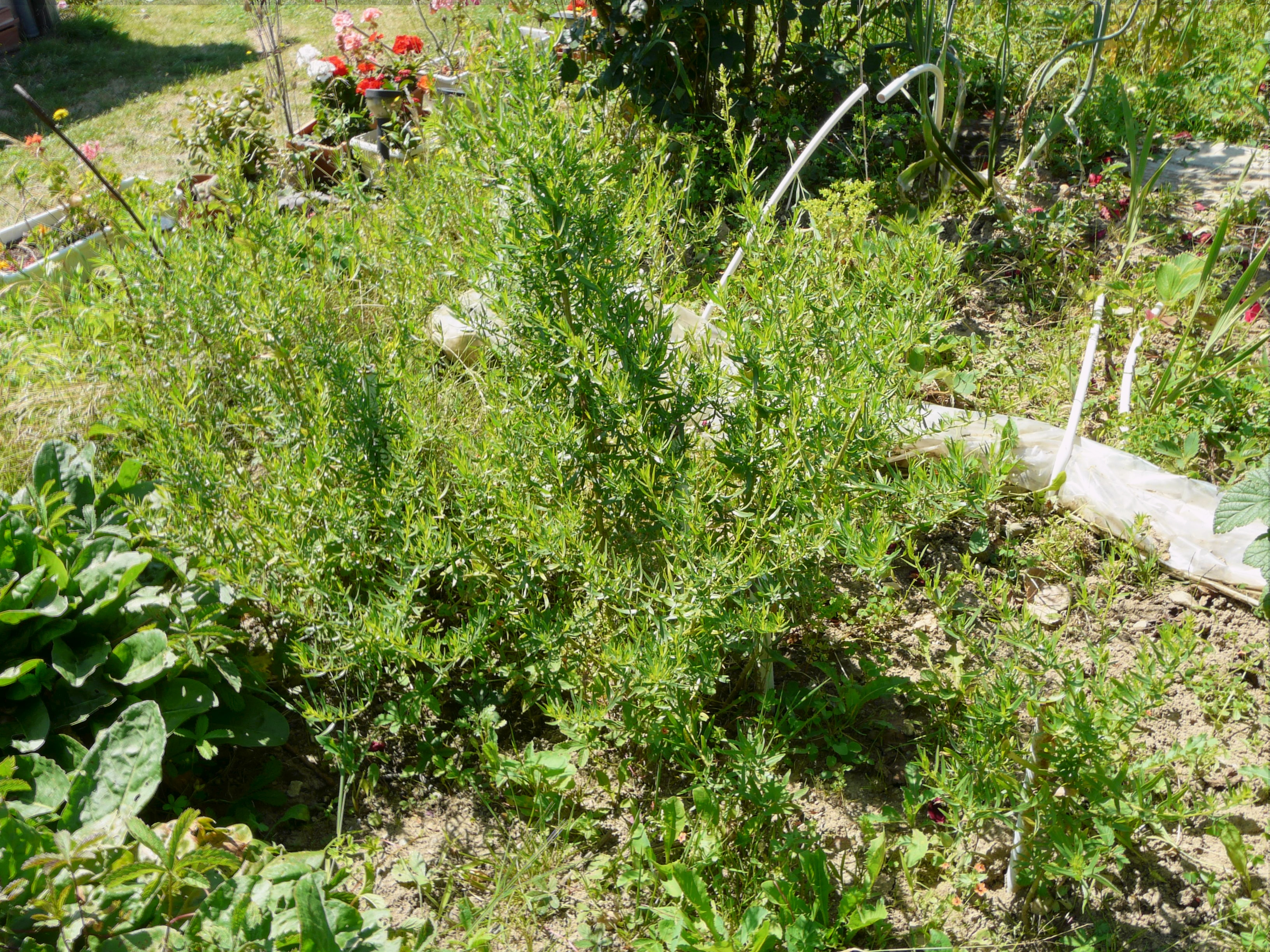
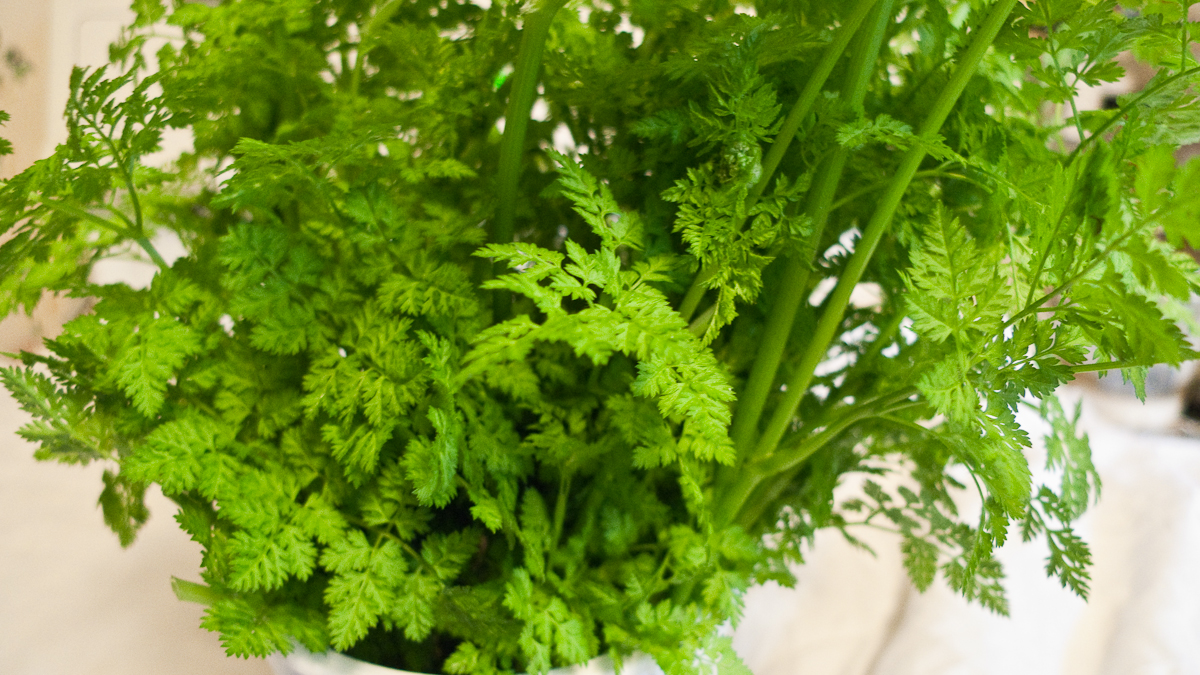
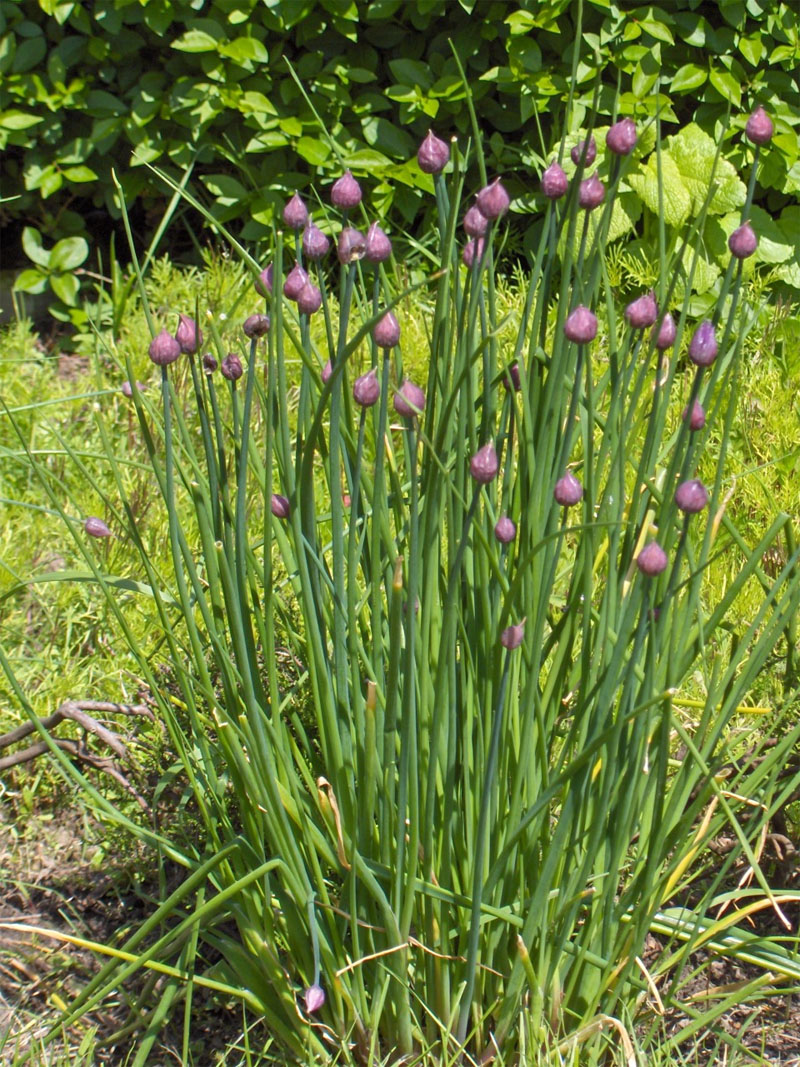
The canonical fines herbes of French cooking. Top to bottom: parsley (Petroselinum crispum), tarragon (Artemisia dracunculus) chervil (Anthriscus cerefolium) and chives (Allium schoenoprasum).

Fines herbes (French: [fin.z‿ɛʁb]) designates an important combination of herbs that forms a mainstay of French cuisine. The canonical fines herbes of French haute cuisine comprise finely chopped parsley, chives, tarragon, and chervil. These are employed in seasoning delicate dishes, such as chicken, fish, and eggs, that need a relatively short cooking period; they may also be used in a beurre blanc sauce for seasoning such dishes. Fines herbes are also eaten raw in salads.

The Mediterranean region, Western and Central Asia, the Indian subcontinent, South America, and East Asia are especially rich in these species.

== The classic mixture ==
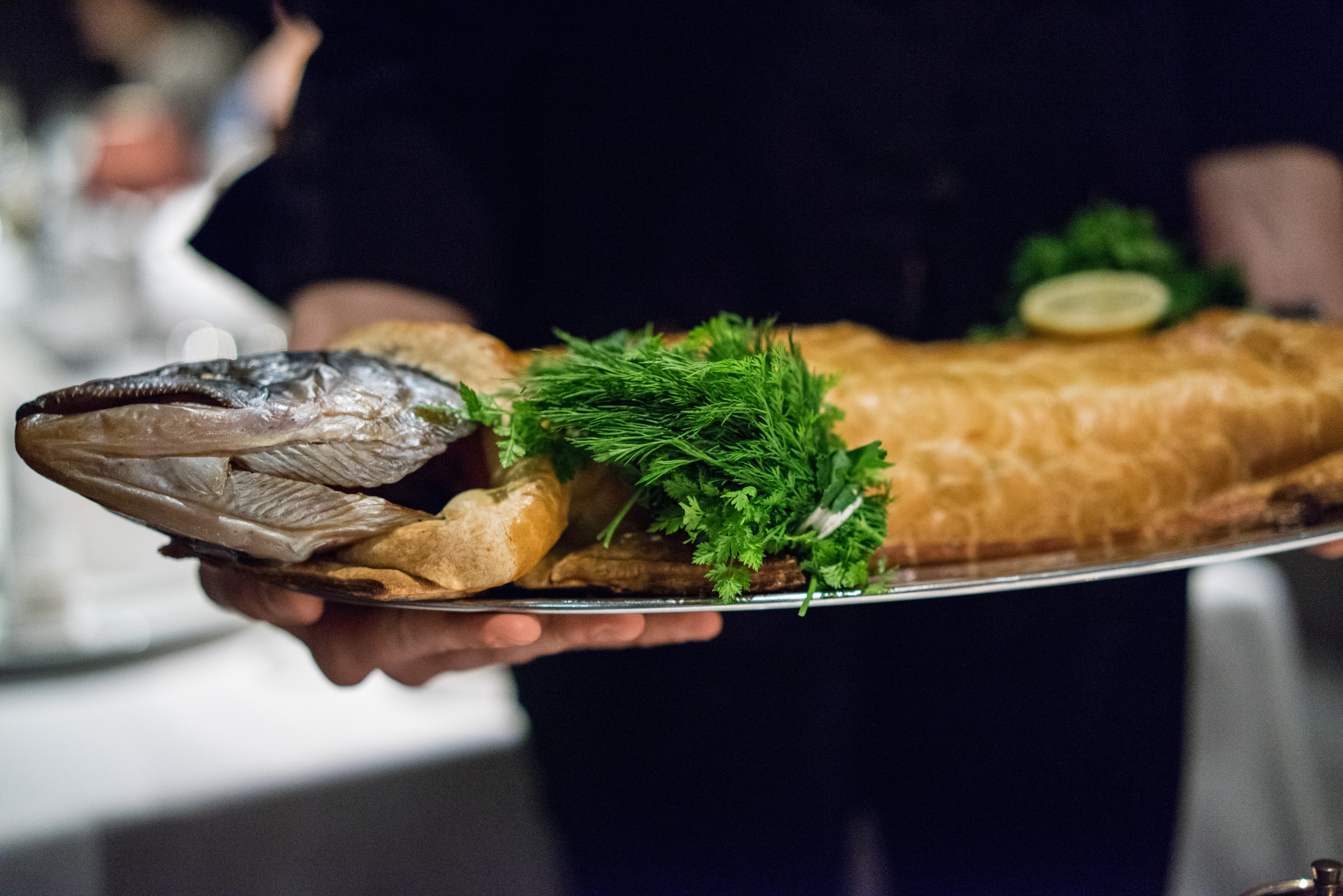
Fines herbes on a salmon coulibiac

In 1903, the renowned chef Auguste Escoffier noted that dishes labeled aux fines herbes were sometimes being made with parsley alone. In his Culinary Guide, Escoffier insisted that:

It is a mistake to serve, under the name Omelette aux fines herbes, an omelette in which chopped parsley furnishes the only aromatic note. This error is too widespread for us to hope to overturn it. Nevertheless, it should be stressed that an omelette aux fines herbes must contain: parsley, chives, and a little chervil and tarragon.

Thirty-five years later, under the entry "Fines Herbes", the authoritative Larousse Gastronomique of 1938 conceded that, generally speaking, an Omelette aux fines herbes was still most frequently being seasoned only with chopped parsley, but repeated Escoffier's admonition that it ought to contain a combination of fragrant herbs, "such as, parsley, chervil, tarragon, and also chives". For in former times this was the traditional practice (la pratique ancienne), when "to the aforementioned herbs, chopped mushrooms, and even truffles, would be added".

Julia Child also echoes Escoffier: "A mixture of fresh parsley, chives, tarragon, and chervil is called fines herbes", while Alan Davidson, author of The Oxford Companion to Food, identifies chopped fresh parsley as the minimum basis of the fines herbes mix, with the addition of "any (or all) of: chervil, tarragon, chives", noting that the number of different herbs to be used is not fixed. Food scientist Harold McGee's definition limits the number to tarragon, chervil, chive, and omits parsley. McGee also recommends that the herbs be finely chopped using a sharp knife rather than a food processor, "since food processors slice into herbs and introduce a lot of air and therefore aroma-altering oxygen".

== Substitutions ==
A living tradition, such as cooking, is always subject to variation and re-creation. For example, in his memoirs, the late Pierre Franey, former chef at Le Pavillon and long-time New York Times columnist, vividly recalled his trepidation when as a teenaged apprentice chef, he was ordered to prepare a simple "omelette aux fines herbes—three eggs, chervil, parsley, tarragon, chives—the first omelette I was assigned to prepare for paying guests, after a considerable amount of practicing on others." In his anxiety he almost spoiled the dish. Yet, in his accompanying recipe for Americans printed in the same book, Franey substitutes basil for the chervil, doubtless because, especially in the United States, chervil, unless home-grown, can be very hard to obtain when fresh and is nearly useless when dried.

== As "noble herbs" ==
In general, definitions of the fines herbes group in American cook books have tended to be somewhat elastic. James Beard's Fireside Cookbook (1949), for example, contains a recipe for what he calls a "Fines Herbes Bowl", a dip featuring chopped parsley, chives, dill, chopped green pepper and salt, mixed into a pint of sour cream. In his subsequent discussion of "Salad Herbs", Beard lists: 1) Tarragon: "The most pleasant salad herb .... Use the fresh if you can"; 2) Chervil, which he calls "delicate and subtle"; 3) Fresh Dill, which Beard recommends especially for salads containing cucumber or cabbage; and 4) Sweet Basil: a "a natural complement to tomatoes". Beard identifies these four herbs (tarragon, chervil, dill, and basil) as, "the noblest of the salad herbs", noting parenthetically, however, that "some people like to use a little thyme or rosemary". Finally, the basis of the French fines herbes lineup: parsley, although not one of Beard's aforementioned "noble" salad herbs, yet "adds much to many salad mixtures, although in a green salad it has perhaps less place". The Mediterranean region, Western and Central Asia, the Indian subcontinent, South America, and East Asia are especially rich in these species

== Versus "robust herbs" ==
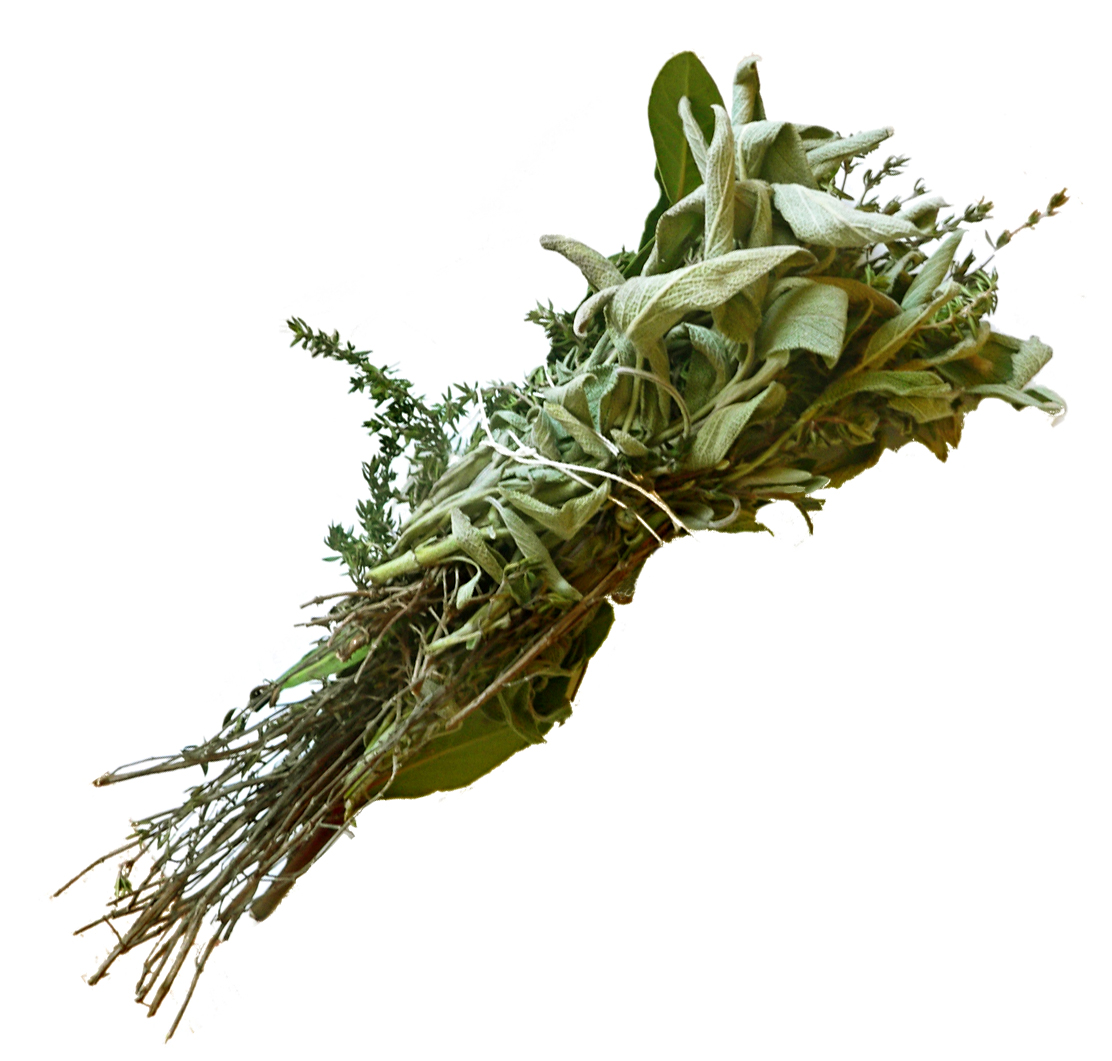
Bouquet garni of thyme, bay leaves and sage

The "fines herbes" are sometimes contrasted with the more pungent or resinous "robust herbs" that appear in a bouquet garni and which, unlike fines herbes, release their flavour in long cooking. However, there is some inconsistency and overlap in terminology.
