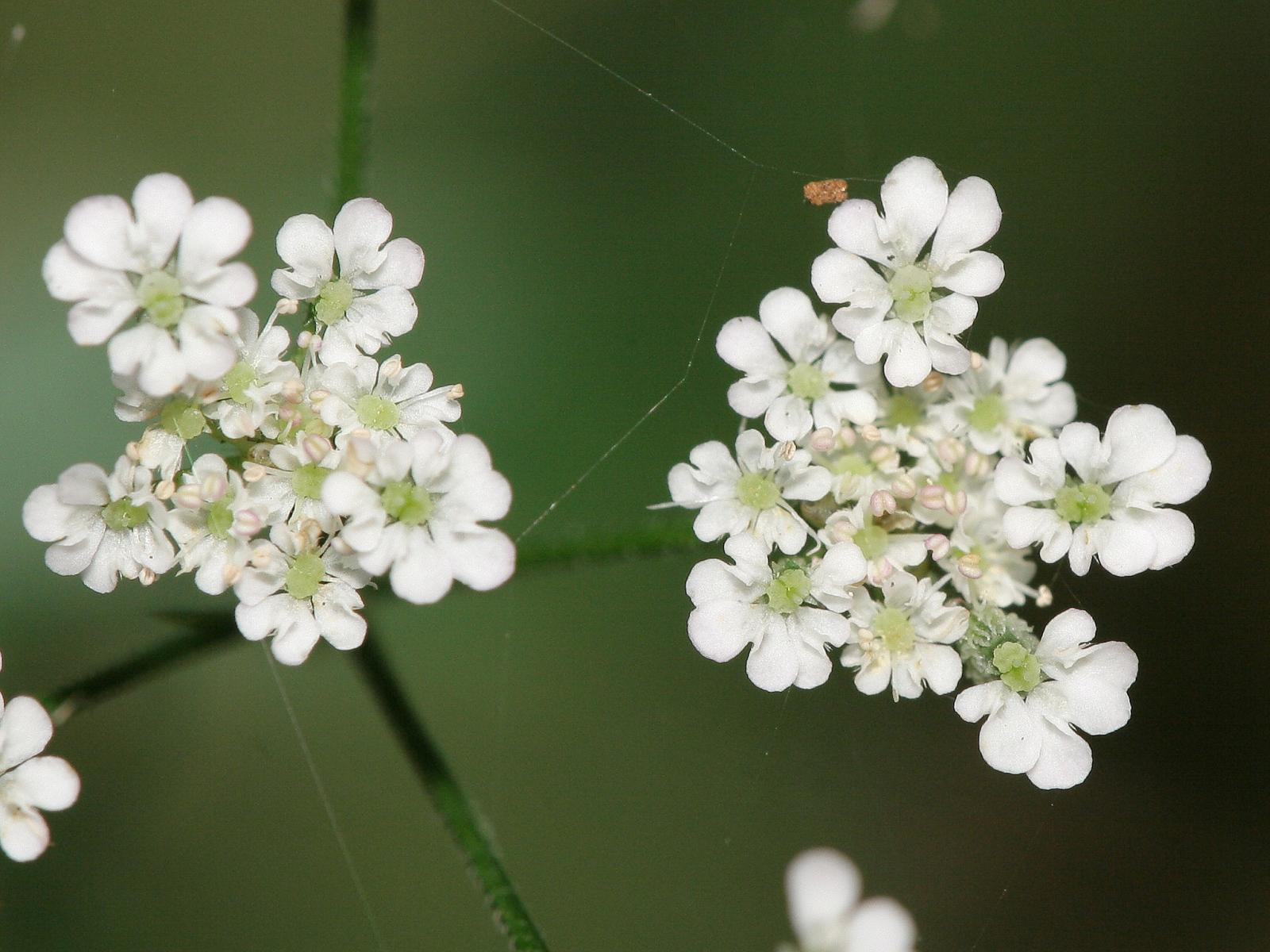
- Torilis japonica

Scientific classification
- Kingdom: Plantae
- Clade: Embryophytes
- Clade: Tracheophytes
- Clade: Spermatophytes
- Clade: Angiosperms
- Clade: Eudicots
- Clade: Asterids
- Order: Apiales
- Family: Apiaceae
- Subfamily: Apioideae
- Tribe: Scandiceae
- Subtribe: Torilidinae
- Genus: Torilis; Adans.

Species
- About 15, see text

= Torilis =

Genus of flowering plants

Torilis is a genus of plants in the family Apiaceae which are known generally as the hedge parsleys. They are native to Eurasia and North Africa but have been introduced to other continents. T. arvensis is quite widespread in North America but is facing population decline in the UK.

Selected species:

- Torilis arvensis – spreading hedge parsley, tall sock-destroyer, Canadian hedge parsley, common hedge parsley
- Torilis japonica – Japanese hedge parsley
- Torilis leptophylla – bristlefruit hedge parsley
- Torilis nodosa – knotted hedge parsley
- Torilis scabra – rough hedge parsley
