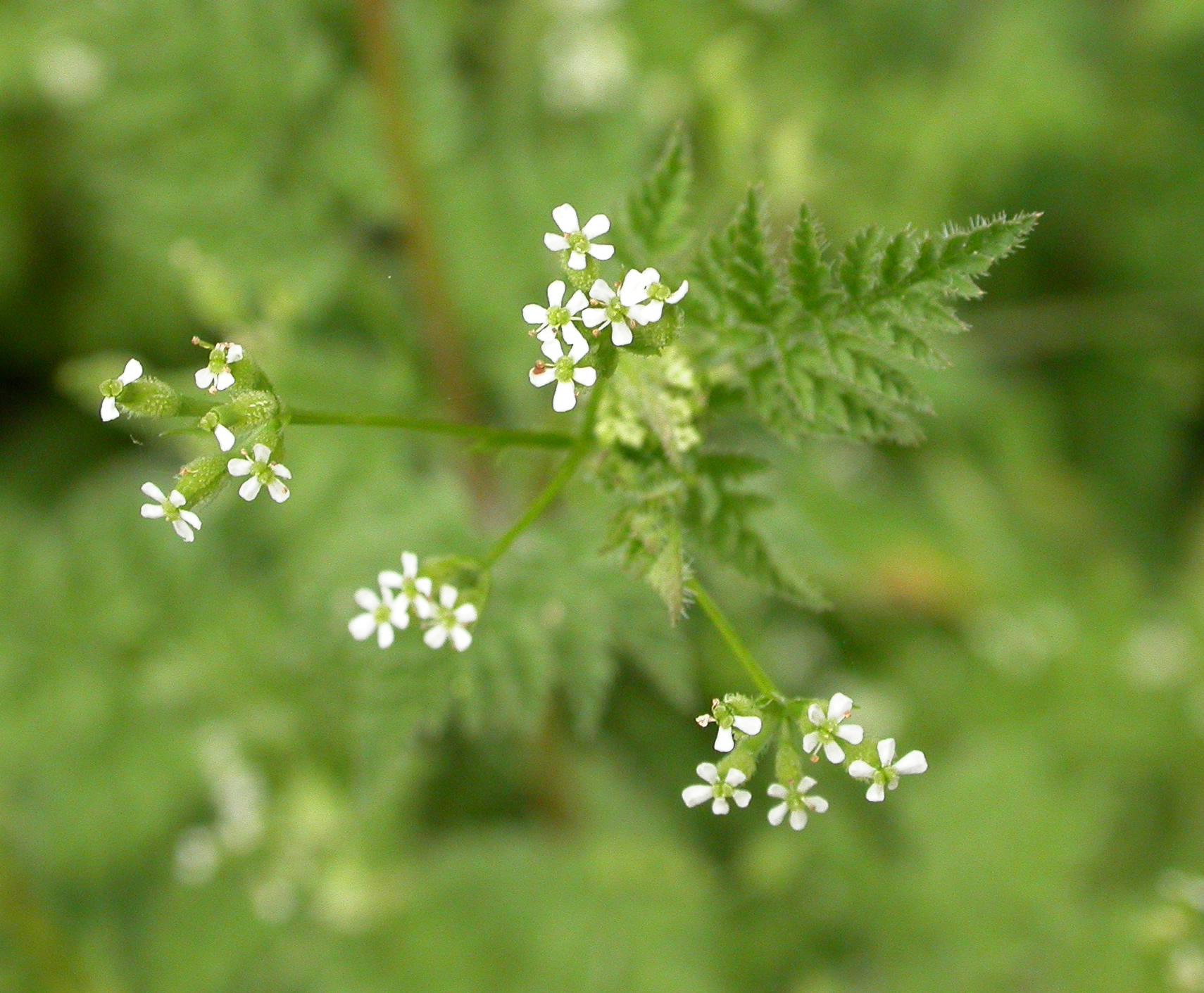

Scientific classification
- Kingdom: Plantae
- Clade: Tracheophytes
- Clade: Angiosperms
- Clade: Eudicots
- Clade: Asterids
- Order: Apiales
- Family: Apiaceae
- Genus: Anthriscus
- Species: A. caucalis

Binomial name
- Anthriscus caucalis M.Bieb.

= Anthriscus caucalis =

Species of flowering plant

Anthriscus caucalis, also burr chervil or bur-chervil, a plant in the family Apiaceae. It is similar in appearance to chervil, the common cooking herb from the same genus. It sends up thin, hollow stems and bears umbels of white flowers. The light green leaves are triangular and made up of many leaflets. The tiny hard fruits, each about 3 millimeters long, are covered in hooked spines. The plant is native to and common in parts of Europe and Asia, and has been introduced elsewhere such as North America.
