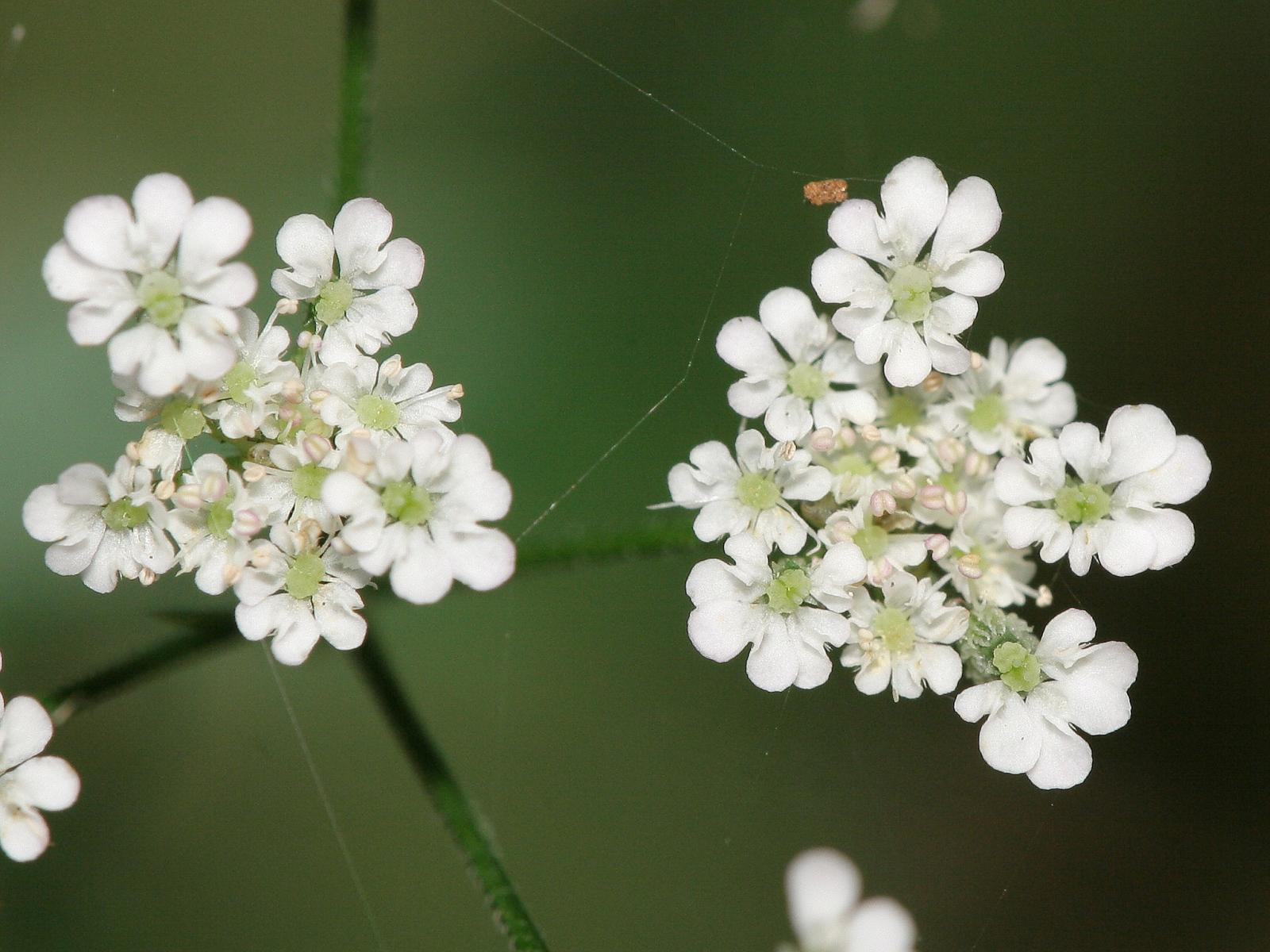

Scientific classification
- Kingdom: Plantae
- Clade: Tracheophytes
- Clade: Angiosperms
- Clade: Eudicots
- Clade: Asterids
- Order: Apiales
- Family: Apiaceae
- Genus: Torilis
- Species: T. japonica

Binomial name
- Torilis japonica (Houtt.) DC.

= Torilis japonica =

Species of flowering plant

Torilis japonica, the erect hedgeparsley, upright hedge-parsley or Japanese hedge parsley, is a herbaceous flowering plant species in the celery family Apiaceae. Japanese hedge parsley is considered both an annual and biennial plant depending on the biogeographical location. This means Japanese hedge parsley can complete its life cycle in either one or two growing seasons depending on habitat. Japanese hedge parsley is typically found in areas with disturbed soils, pastures, margins, open woodland, near waste sites, or right-of-way habitats. It can withstand a variety of habitats, thriving in partial and full shaded areas, but also withstanding habitats with full sunlight penetration. It is considered an aggressive invasive species in North America; invading a wide range of habitats due to its environmental tolerance and tendency to outcompete native vegetation. This species is considered a threat in several areas that causes problems relating to overall environmental health and stability. Aside from its environmental implications, T. japonica has potential to fight several cancers through a terpene it produces called Torilin, extracted from its fruits.

== Description ==
Japanese hedge parsley typically grows between 2–4 feet tall during its second year of growth. The leaves of Japanese hedge parsley are fern-like, alternate, divided pinnately, and have very slim stems that support each leaf. The plant doesn't flower until its second growth year in June–August and the flowers are white with five petals in multiple broad domed umbels. The flowers are bisexual in the epicenter and a stamen is located at the margins of the umbels. There are five stamens that alternate with the petals of the flowers and the ovary is located below. Japanese hedge parsley can be described as unspecialized and self-fertile, and very attractive to pollinators.

Each plant produces easily distributable bristle-textured, rosy or white/green fruits that eventually turn brown when mature. The fruits are schizocarps and then mericarps when split into two. The schizocarpic fruits are dry, remain closed until maturity, and have two pollen-containing chambers. Each mericarp of the fruit is five-ribbed, making its dispersal highly effective and competitive towards native vegetation.

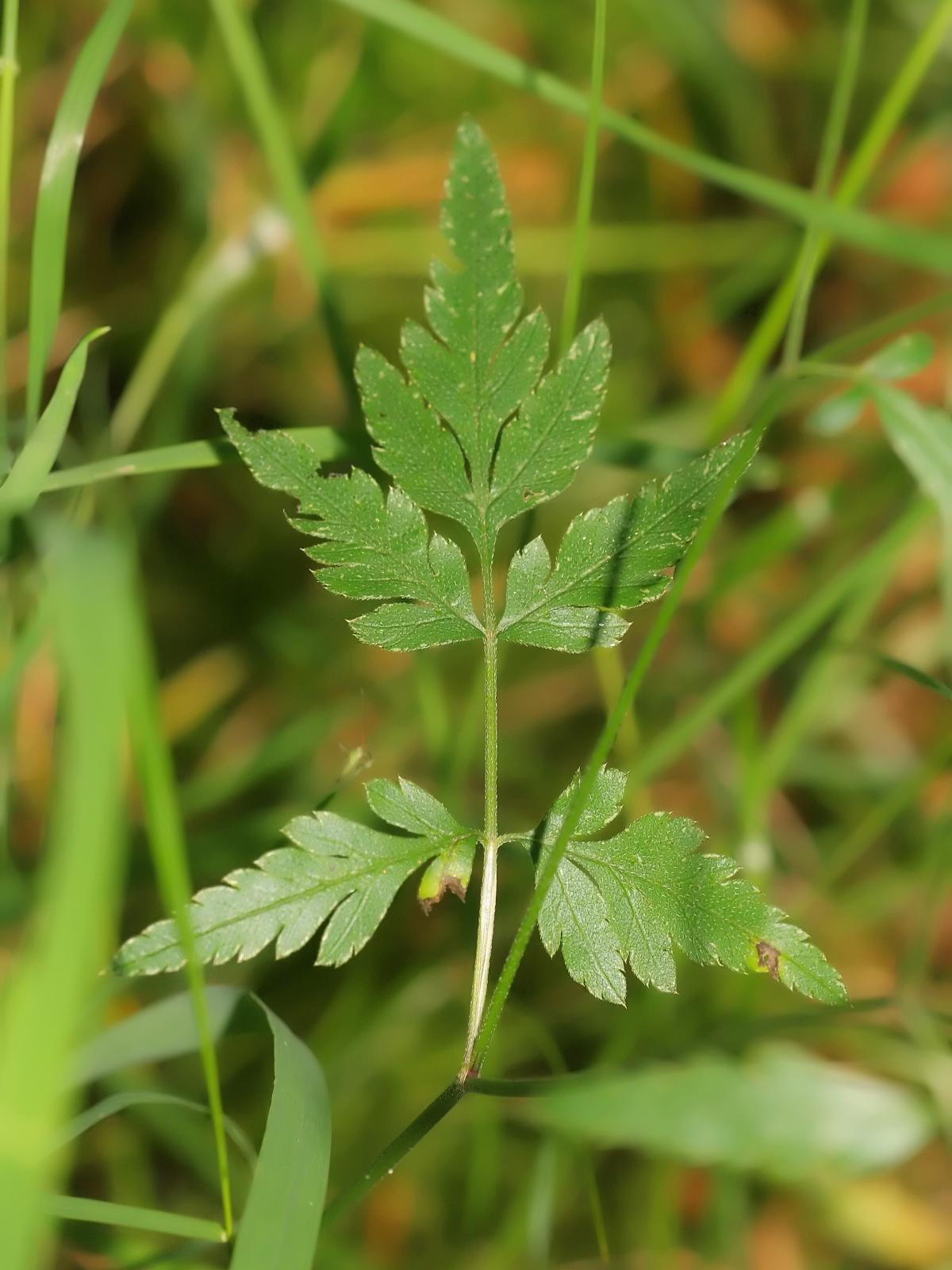
Leaf

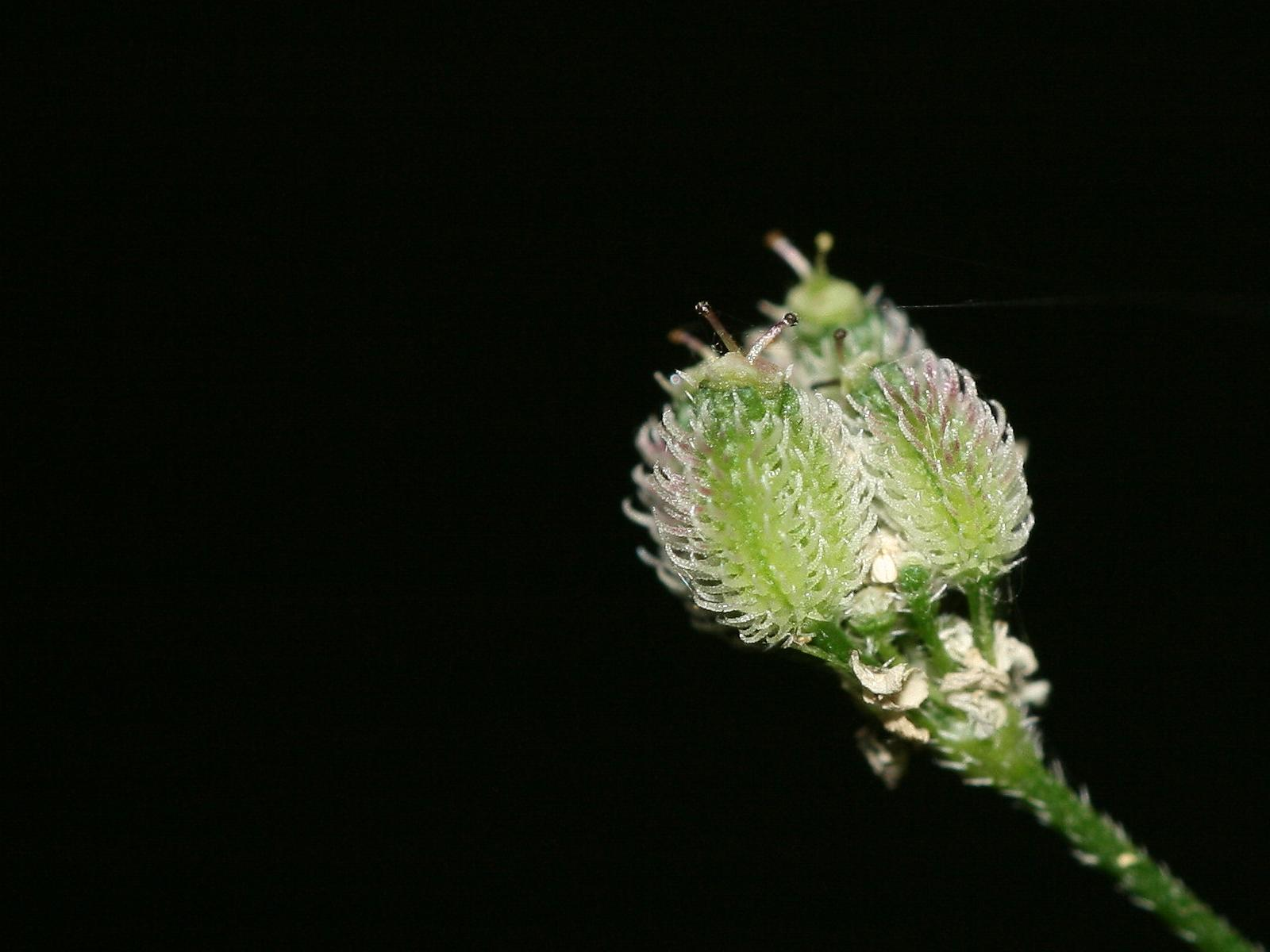
Fruit

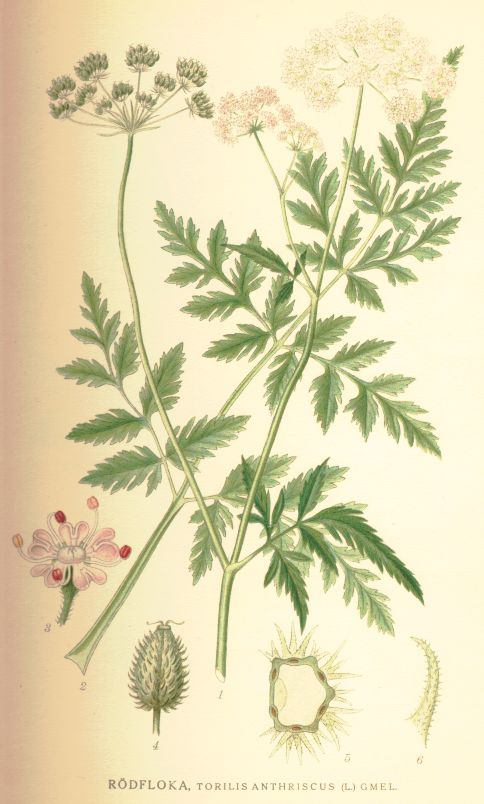
Illustration

== Distribution ==
Despite japonica meaning “of Japan”, the native range of Japanese hedge parsley spans from Western Europe to central Asia, northern Japan, and Mediterranean parts of northern Africa. In Europe, T. japonica is a summer annual/biennial. In its United States invasive range, it is considered a summer biennial. In Japan, it is considered a winter annual.

== As an invasive species in North America ==
The major threat from Japanese hedge parsley is its ability to grow vigorously and disperse rapidly. Japanese hedge parsley was first introduced to North America in 1917 and has been considered invasive since its introduction. Reasons for its introduction are unknown, but it is assumed it was for medicinal purposes because it is not considered ornamental. The plant's current distribution as an invasive species is in southern parts of Canada and in the Midwestern, Eastern, Southern parts of the US, and Oregon.

In Wisconsin, the Department of Natural Resources (DNR) found that this plant tends to establish itself along roadsides, edge habitats, or open areas and then spread to grasslands, prairies, savannahs, and forests. A 1979 study revealed that Japanese hedge parsley seeds showed the most promising degree of survival in harsh and disturbed soils, which revealed its overall resilience and threatening ability to invade. Also, the plant can produce seeds that do not germinate until the following autumn of the next year, allowing seeds to build up in the seed bank and increase elimination difficulty. This strategy gives Japanese hedge parsley an advantage in areas where native vegetation fails to grow or becomes disturbed. Mowing of the initially established habitats encourage population density growth when brown fruits are present, which could be the reason for its initial ability to spread over a short period of time.

This species has been commonly misidentified with other species within the genus Torilis (T. arvensis), which has inhibited knowledge of its range and overall seriousness as a threat to biodiversity. Researchers have not determined why this plant is invasive in North America while exhibiting not invasive tendencies as an agricultural weed in Europe. The species is clearly highly adaptive to its biogeographic location, utilizing certain strategies more than others depending on the environment in which it is found. Studies have shown that seed dormancy and germination differ greatly across the US and across the globe. This limiting the scientific understanding on management strategies. To date, there are no documented studies on Japanese hedge parsley's effect on native vegetation communities in relation to the possible response to climate change or eutrophication.

=== Control strategies ===
The Wisconsin DNR has listed several non-chemical ways of removing the species. They list pulling, cutting, or mowing the stems as being effective, but only 50-70% effect the following season after treatment. When the brown fruits are present on the plants, it is important to avoid mowing to limit seed spread. If the brown fruits are present when pulling and cutting, fruits should be disposed of properly to avoid dispersal. Prescribed burns are another non-chemical control method that the Wisconsin DNR suggests when treating Japanese hedge parsley. After applying this control method, the following season shows a 50% effectiveness in terms of permanent removal. Thus, burning may only be effective in conjunction with other control techniques and / or fire adapted habitats such as prairies.

The Wisconsin DNR also recommends several chemical management options for treating Japanese hedge parsley. Glyphosate, a common herbicide that is applied to the leaves of plants to regulate growth. As a means of chemical control, glyphosate should be applied to Japanese hedge parsley vegetation during its first year of growth in the fall or spring. Although, this was found to be less than 50% effective the season after treatment. Chemical treatment with Metasulfuron can be applied to rosettes in the spring or fall and was found to be 70-90% effective the season following the treatment. Lastly, the DNR mentions Triclopyr, a common herbicide used on woody and herbaceous weeds, as a means of chemical treatment to rosettes in the spring or fall, but may result in contamination of groundwater if not used properly and is only 50-70% effective the season after the control methods.

In terms of Japanese hedge parsley's seed resilience and germination, it was found that when exposed to lower temperatures the seeds become dormant, which can also be reversed by exposure to higher temperatures. This suggests that Japanese hedge parsley can become more aggressive in higher temperatures, alluding to possible effects of climate change. A study exploring the impacts of clipping time on Japanese hedge parsley and seed production recommend clipping the plant in the reproductive phase but before fruit ripening.

In Wisconsin, Japanese hedge parsley is prohibited/restricted under the state's Invasive Rule- NR 40. This identifies the species as established in the state and posing a huge threat to human and environmental health and transporting, possessing, or introducing without a permit is regulated. Overall, very little policy has been made in response to the biological invasion of this species.

== Medicinal use ==
Japanese hedge parsley has been known for its medicinal properties in Chinese traditional medicine. It has been used for treating hemorrhoids, spasm, uterine tumors, fever, and dysentery. Recently, medical studies have shown that Japanese Hedgeparsley may have a potential for combating cancer. A substance known as torilin can be extracted from the plant and has been shown to be a potent inhibitor of 5 alpha-reductase, the enzyme that converts testosterone to DHT. Torilin is a compound from the fruits of the plant and has been shown to inhibit the growth of blood vessels in tumor development from benign to malignant and thus has a toxic effect on tumors. It also has been found to inhibit the conversion of testosterone to androgen, which is being studied further in the treatment of prostate cancer and alopecia.
