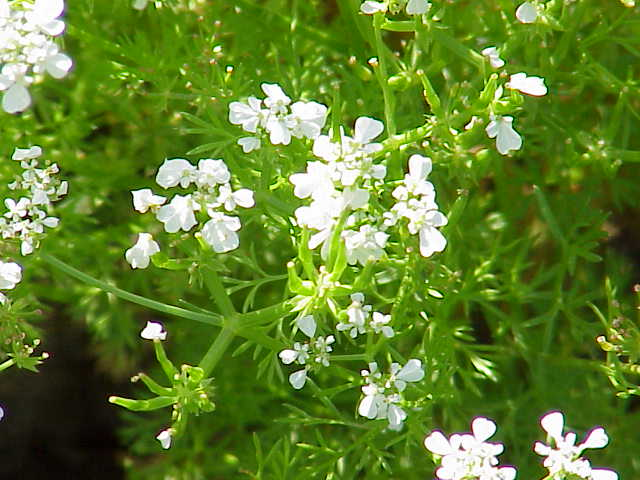
- Garden chervil (Anthriscus cerefolium)

Scientific classification
- Kingdom: Plantae
- Clade: Embryophytes
- Clade: Tracheophytes
- Clade: Angiosperms
- Clade: Eudicots
- Clade: Asterids
- Order: Apiales
- Family: Apiaceae
- Subfamily: Apioideae
- Tribe: Scandiceae
- Subtribe: Scandicinae
- Genus: Anthriscus; Pers.

Species
- 14; see text

Synonyms
- Antriscus Raf.; Centhriscus Spreng. ex Steud.; Cerefolium Fabr.; Chaerefolium Haller; Myrrhodes Möhring ex Kuntze; Oreochorte Koso-Pol.

= Anthriscus =

Genus of flowering plants

Anthriscus (chervils) is a common flowering plant genus of the family Apiaceae, which includes 14 species native to Europe, temperate Asia, northwest Africa, and the tropical African mountains. The genus grows in meadows and verges on slightly wet porous soils. One species, Anthriscus cerefolium is cultivated and used in the kitchen to flavor foods.

Anthriscus species are used as food plants by the larvae of some Lepidoptera species including the mouse moth (recorded on cow parsley).

The hollow stem is erect and branched, ending in compound umbels of small white or greenish flowers. The leaves are bipinnate or tripinnate.

== Species ==
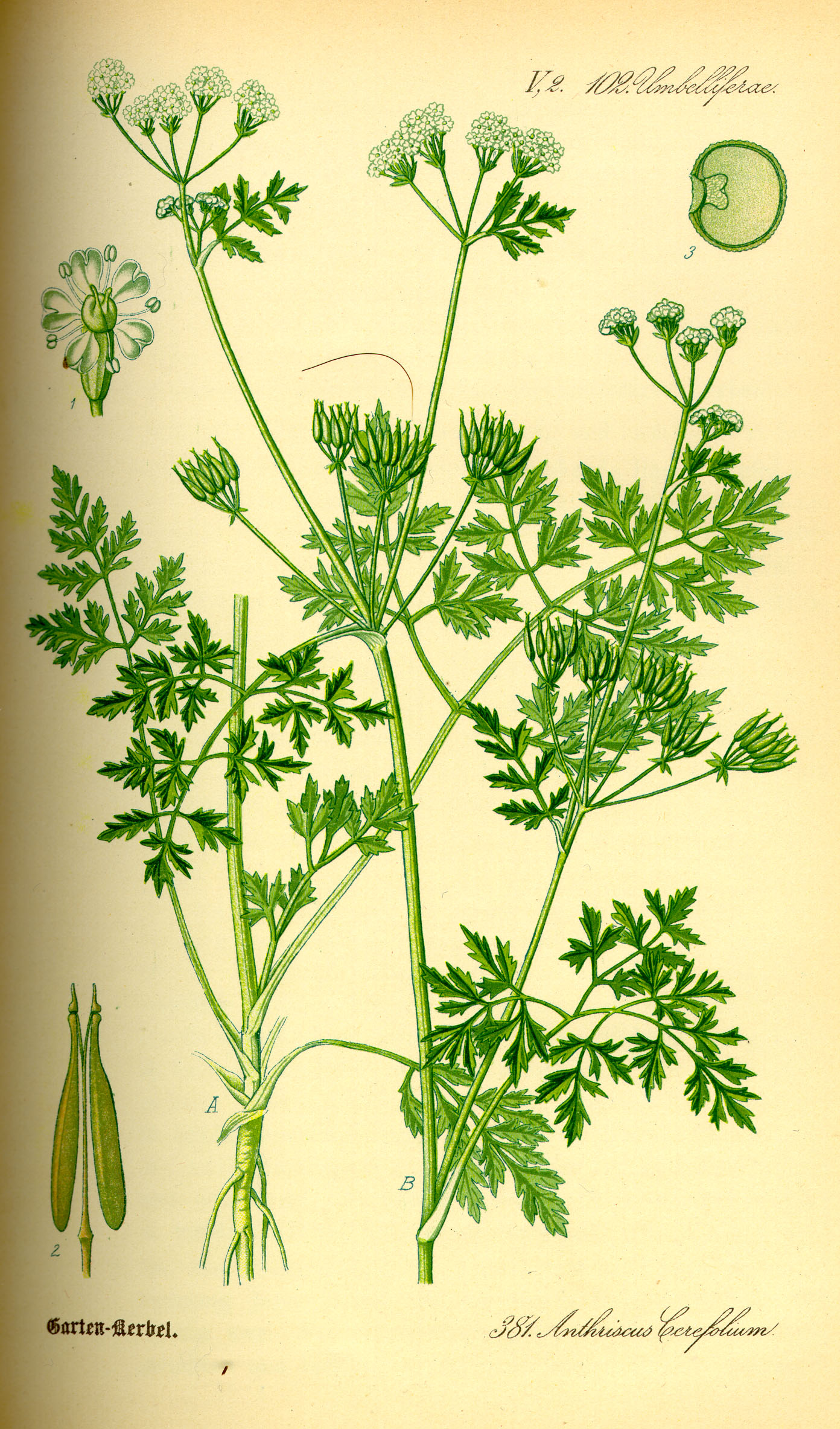
Garden Chervil from Thomé Flora von Deutschland, Österreich und der Schweiz 1885

14 species are accepted.

- Anthriscus caucalis M.Bieb. - bur chervil (native to Europe, northwest Africa, Turkey, Syria-Lebanon, and the Caucasus, introduced elsewhere)
- Anthriscus cerefolium (L.) Hoffm. - garden chervil, French parsley (native to central and eastern Europe and western Asia, introduced elsewhere)
- Anthriscus fumarioides (Waldst. & Kit.) Spreng. (Albania, Greece, Italy, Yugoslavia)
- Anthriscus glacialis Lipsky (Kazakhstan, Kyrgyzstan, Tajikistan)
- Anthriscus kotschyi Fenzl ex Boiss. (Transcaucasus, Turkey)
- Anthriscus lamprocarpus Boiss. (Lebanon, Syria, Palestine, Turkey)
- Anthriscus nemorosus (M. Bieb.) Spreng (Africa and Eurasia)
- Anthriscus nitidus (Wahlenb.) Garcke (Europe)
- Anthriscus ruprechtii Boiss. (Transcaucasus, Turkey)
- Anthriscus schmalhausenii (Albov) Koso-Pol. (Transcaucasus)
- Anthriscus sylvestris (L.) Hoffm. - wild chervil (native temperate Eurasia, northwest Africa, and the tropical African mountains, introduced elsewhere)
- Anthriscus taiwanensis S.S.Ying (Taiwan)
- Anthriscus tenerrimus Boiss. & Spruner (Greece, Turkey)
- Anthriscus velutinus Sommier & Levier (Transcaucasus)

== Etymology ==
The name is from the Latin Anthriscus and Greek anthriskos, names for chervil, and may be connected to the Greek athēr, the "beard" of grain.
