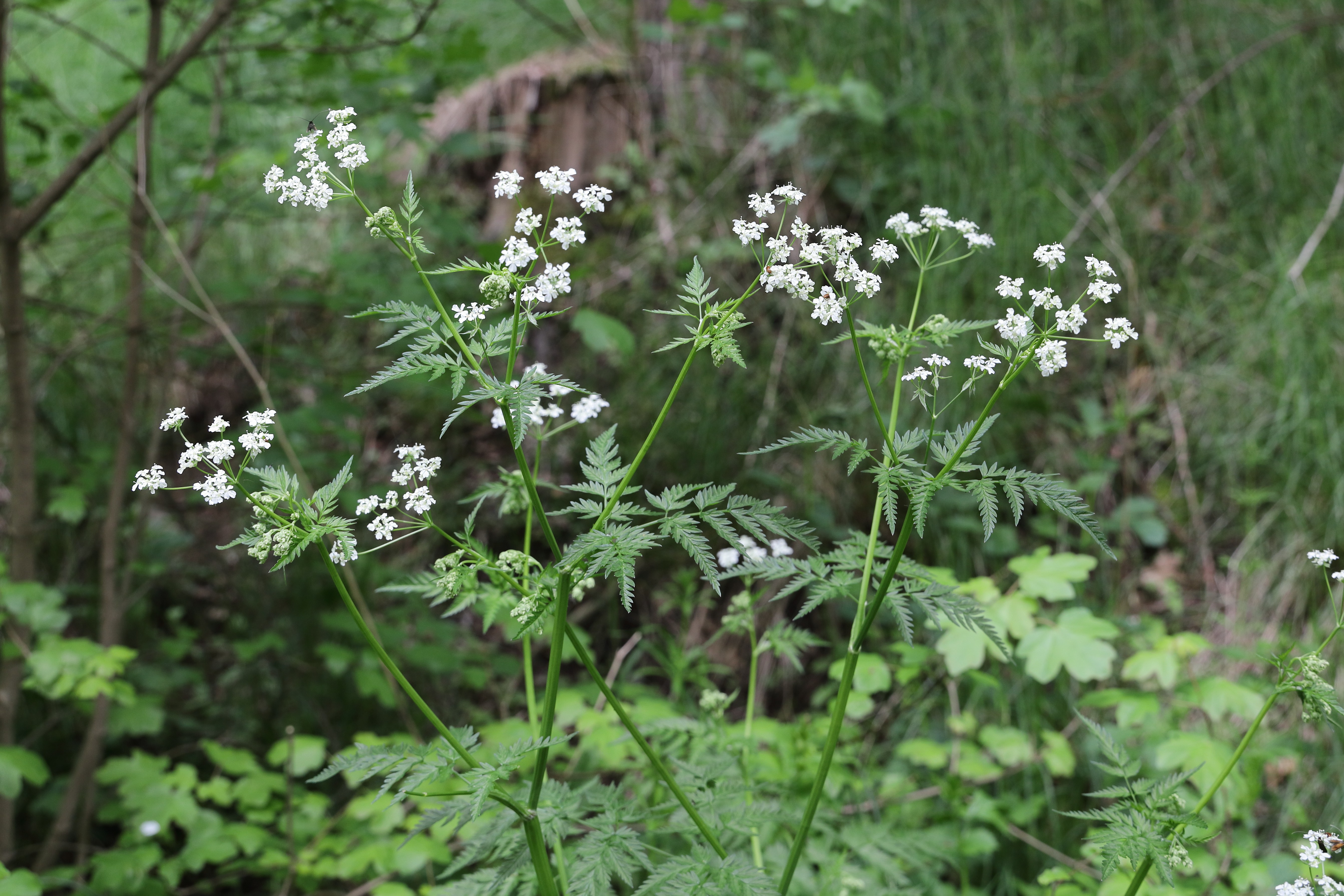

Scientific classification
- Kingdom: Plantae
- Clade: Tracheophytes
- Clade: Angiosperms
- Clade: Eudicots
- Clade: Asterids
- Order: Apiales
- Family: Apiaceae
- Genus: Anthriscus
- Species: A. sylvestris

Binomial name
- Anthriscus sylvestris (L.) Hoffm.

Synonyms
- Synonyms list: Anthriscus alpina (Vill.) Jord.; Anthriscus candollei Rouy & E.G.Camus; Anthriscus chaerophyllea (Lam.) Druce; Anthriscus dissectus C.H.Wright; Anthriscus elatior Besser; Anthriscus intermedia Schur; Anthriscus keniensis H.Wolff; Anthriscus laevigata Griseb.; Anthriscus nemorosa Baker & S.Moore nom. illeg.; Anthriscus pilosa Schur; Anthriscus procera Besser; Anthriscus torquata Duby; Anthriscus yunnanensis W.W.Sm.; Carum sylvestre (L.) Baill.; Caucalis aequicolorum All.; Cerefolium sylvestre (L.) Bubani; Cerefolium tenuifolium Beck; Chaerefolium sylvestre (L.) Schinz; Chaerophyllum affine Steud. ex A.Rich.; Chaerophyllum alpinum Vill.; Chaerophyllum angulatum Kit. ex Spreng.; Chaerophyllum ateanum (Pau) Pau; Chaerophyllum cadonense Schult. ex Steud.; Chaerophyllum ghilanicum Stapf & Wettst.; Chaerophyllum infestum Salisb.; Chaerophyllum lactescens Rochel ex Steud.; Chaerophyllum sylvestre L.; Chaerophyllum tumidum Gilib. nom. inval.; Myrrhis chaerophylloides Hance; Myrrhis sylvestris (L.) Spreng.; Oreochorte yunnanensis (W.W. Sm.) Koso-Pol.; Peucedanum dissectum (C.H. Wright) Dawe

= Anthriscus sylvestris =

Species of flowering plant

Anthriscus sylvestris, known as cow parsley, wild chervil, Queen Anne's lace or keck, is a herbaceous biennial or short-lived perennial plant in the family Apiaceae (Umbelliferae). It is also sometimes called mother-die (especially in the UK), a name that is also applied to Crataegus monogyna (the common hawthorn). It is native to Europe, western Asia and northwestern Africa. It is related to other diverse members of Apiaceae, such as parsley, carrot, hemlock and hogweed. It is often confused with Daucus carota, another member of the Apiaceae also known as "Queen Anne's lace" or "wild carrot".

== Description ==
Cow parsley is an upright herbaceous (non-woody) perennial, growing to 60–170 centimetres (24–67 inches) tall. The stems are hollow, striate (striped with parallel, longitudinal lines), furrowed, and green in colour with flushes of purple, with a diameter up to 1.5 cm (0.59 in). It has tiny hairs on the stem, rachis, and leaf stalks which are difficult to see but can easily be detected by touch. The petioles clasp the stem around the base and are broad and flattened with a downy margin. The rachis has a deeply grooved channel.

The leaves are triangular, 2–3 pinnate, roughly 30 cm wide and 45 cm long, green, and fern-like or feathery in appearance with hair on the underside. The lowest primary division is much smaller than the rest of the leaf.

The flowers are arranged in compound umbels on short pedicels (<1 cm) with a ring of short, stout hairs at the apex. There are downy oval bractioles with red pointy tips on the umbels, arranged on 4–10 rays 1.5–3 cm long. The rays are glabrous (smooth and hairless), with no bract present. Peduncles are similar in length to rays, more or less glabrous and furrowed. Each flower has 5 white petals, 2 stamens and 2 styles with an enlarged base forming a swelling at the apex of the ovary (stylopodium).

The main stem meets the roots in a single primary taproot which can branch further below the surface. From the roots lateral rhizomes can form. Flowering time in the UK is April to early June.

== Taxonomy ==
The species was first described by Carl Linnaeus in 1753 as Chaerophyllum sylvestre. It was transferred to the genus Anthriscus by Georg Franz Hoffmann in 1814.

== Habitat ==
Cow parsley grows in sunny to semi-shaded locations in meadows and at the edges of hedgerows and woodland. It is a particularly common sight by the roadside and with its frothy early-flowering white blooms is regarded as the most important springtime landscape wildflower in Britain. However, the plant is also sufficiently common and fast-growing to be considered a nuisance weed in gardens. Cow parsley's ability to spread rapidly by means of rhizomes and to produce large quantities of seeds in a single growing season has made it an invasive species in many areas of the United States. Vermont has listed cow parsley on its "Watch List" of invasive species, while Massachusetts has banned the sale of the plant. It is classed as a Class B Noxious Weed in the State of Washington since 1989, where its sale is also banned. In Iceland, where cow parsley is now commonly seen overgrowing lupine fields, it has been classified as an alien invasive species.

== Uses ==
All above-ground parts of the cow parsley plant are edible, with a flavour sharper than garden chervil and described as grassy parsley, with a hint of licorice or aniseed. However, it is suspected of being mildly toxic according to some sources. The plant is an invasive species in many places outside of its native range. It spreads easily along roads and the edges of woods and fields, so it is not cultivated but instead foraged in the wild. In the UK it is foraged from February to November. However extreme caution is advised when foraging cow parsley because it is easily confused with other species of the Apiaceae family, such as the deadly poison hemlock, hemlock water-dropwort and fool's parsley. Because the plant's flavour is considered unremarkable and the risk is great, foraging cow parsley in the wild is usually strongly discouraged.

== Gallery ==
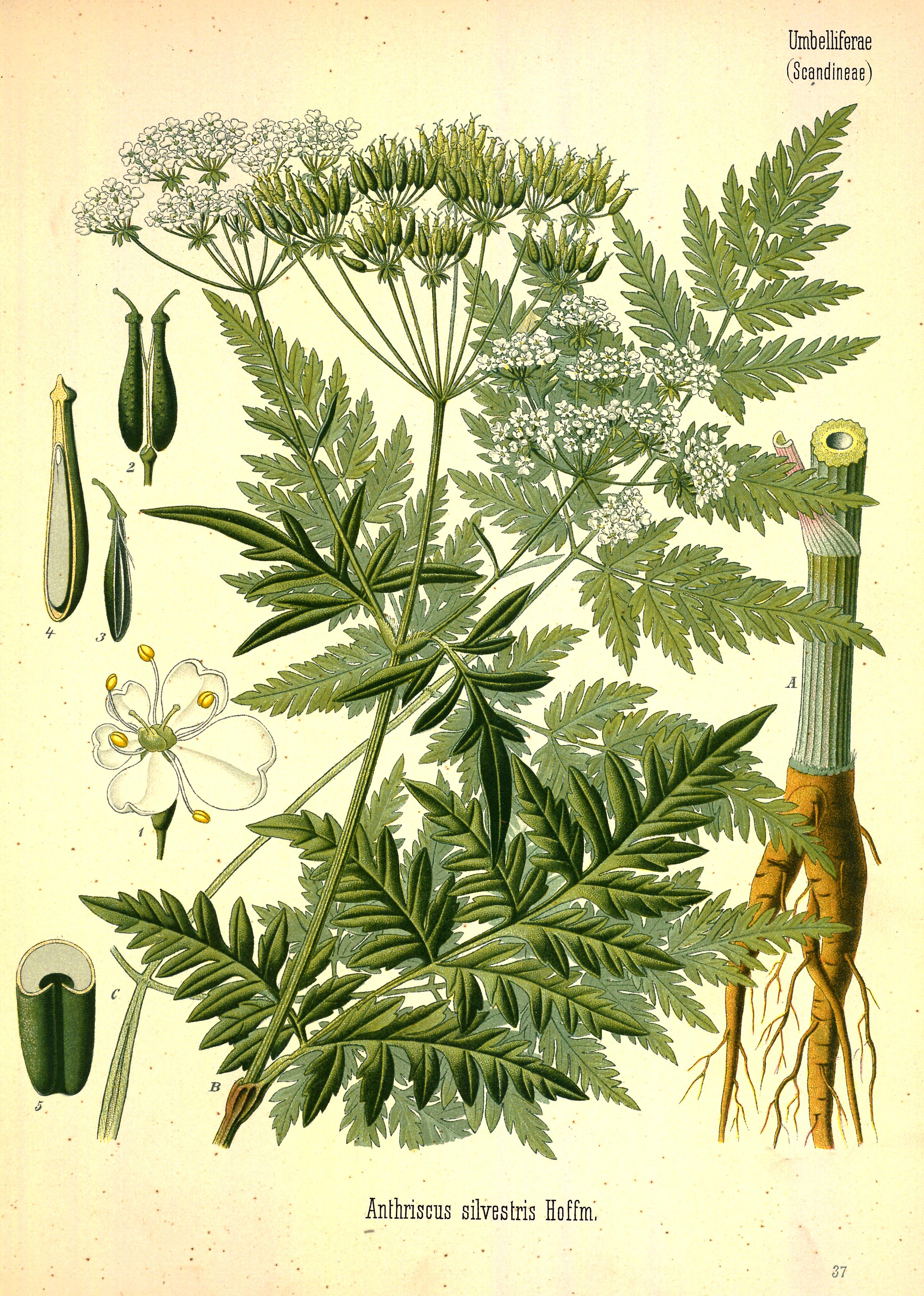
Illustration from Köhler's Medicinal Plants

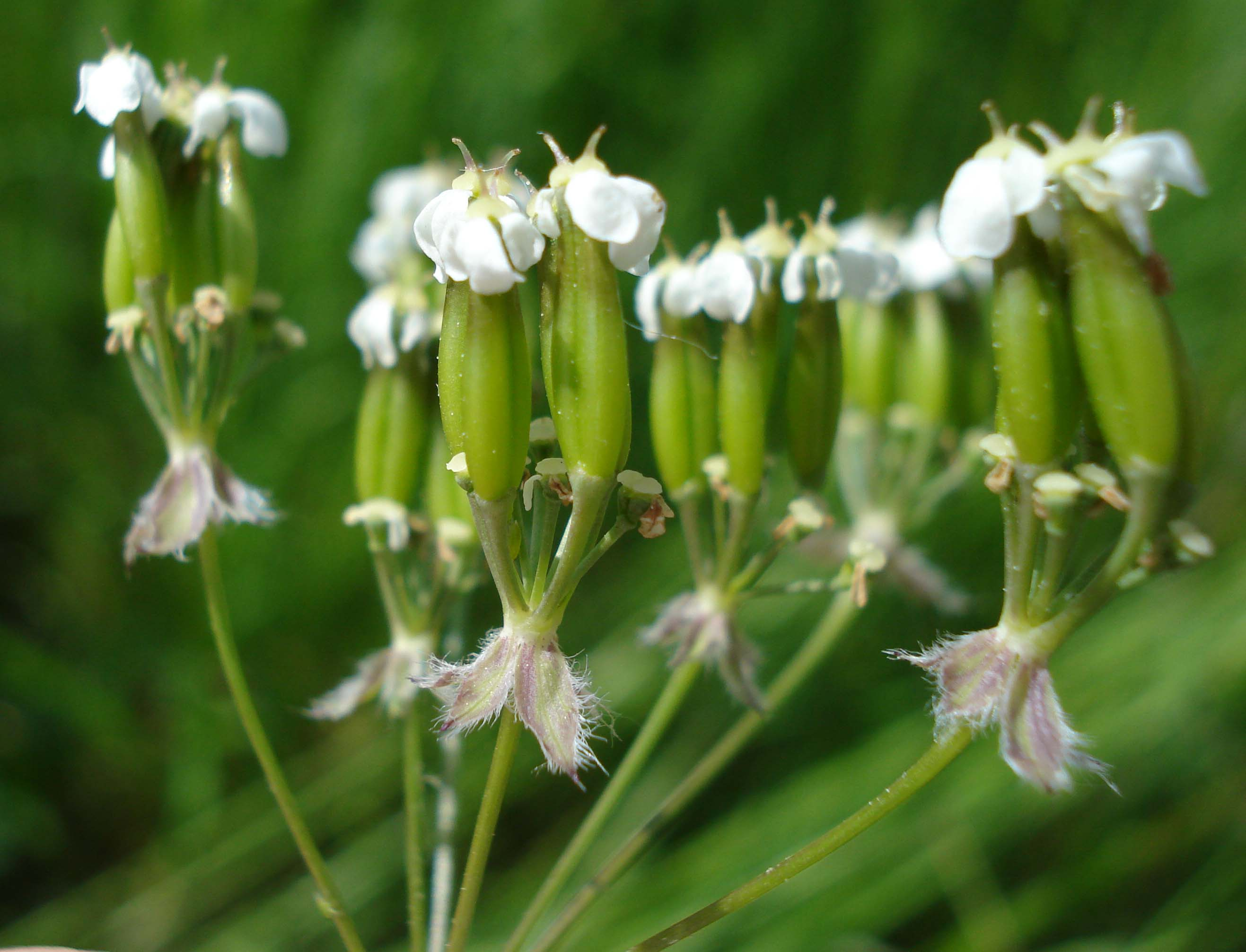

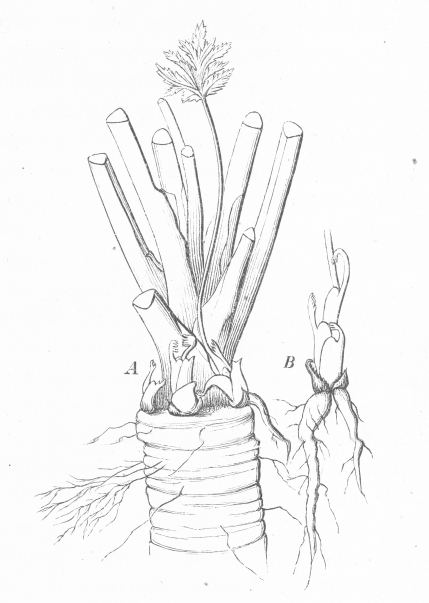
The base of a second-year plant in September and a young layer (Warming 1884)
