= Flora of Romania =

Plants endemic to Romania

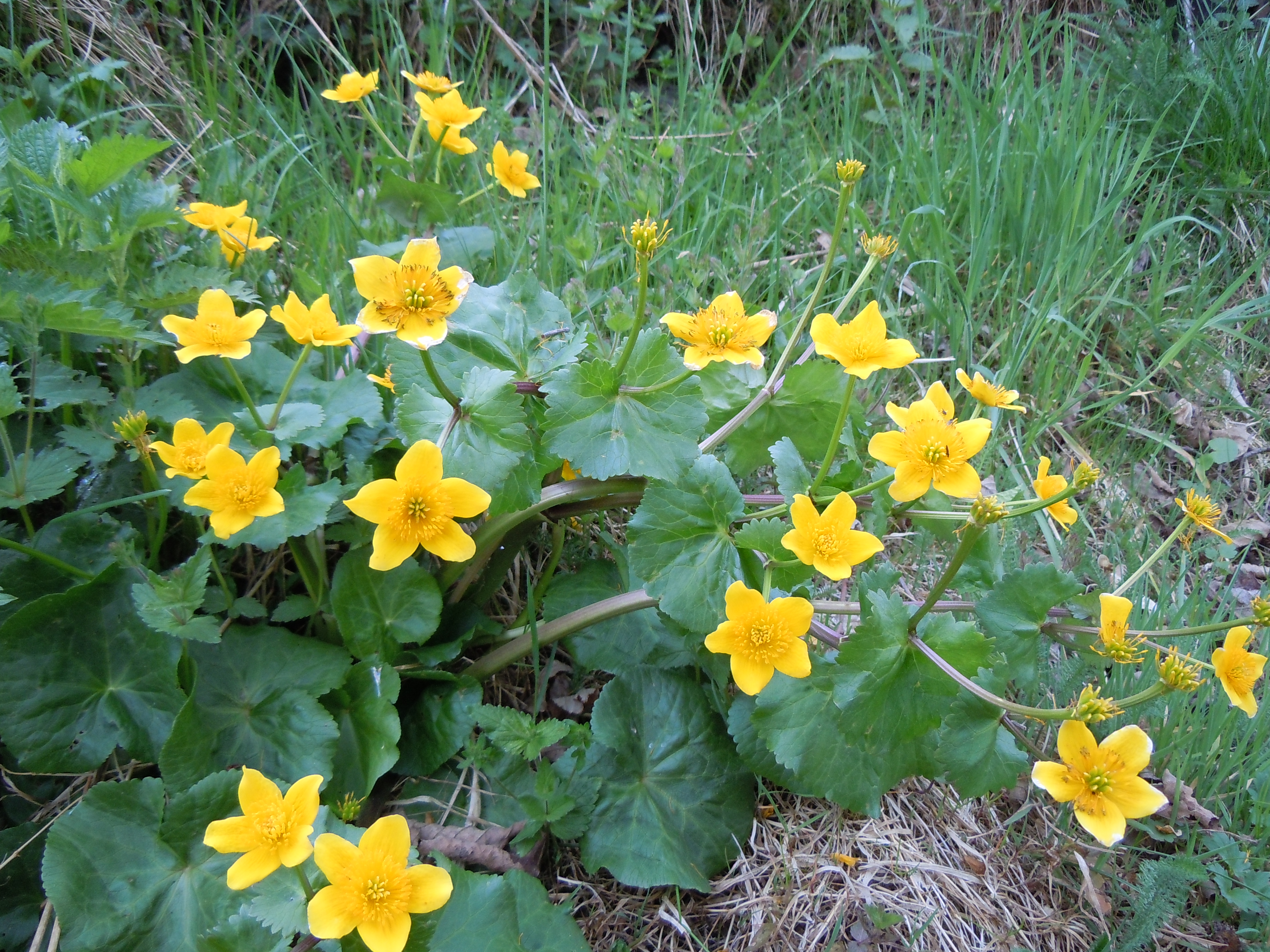
Caltha palustris near the Făgăraș Mountains of Romania

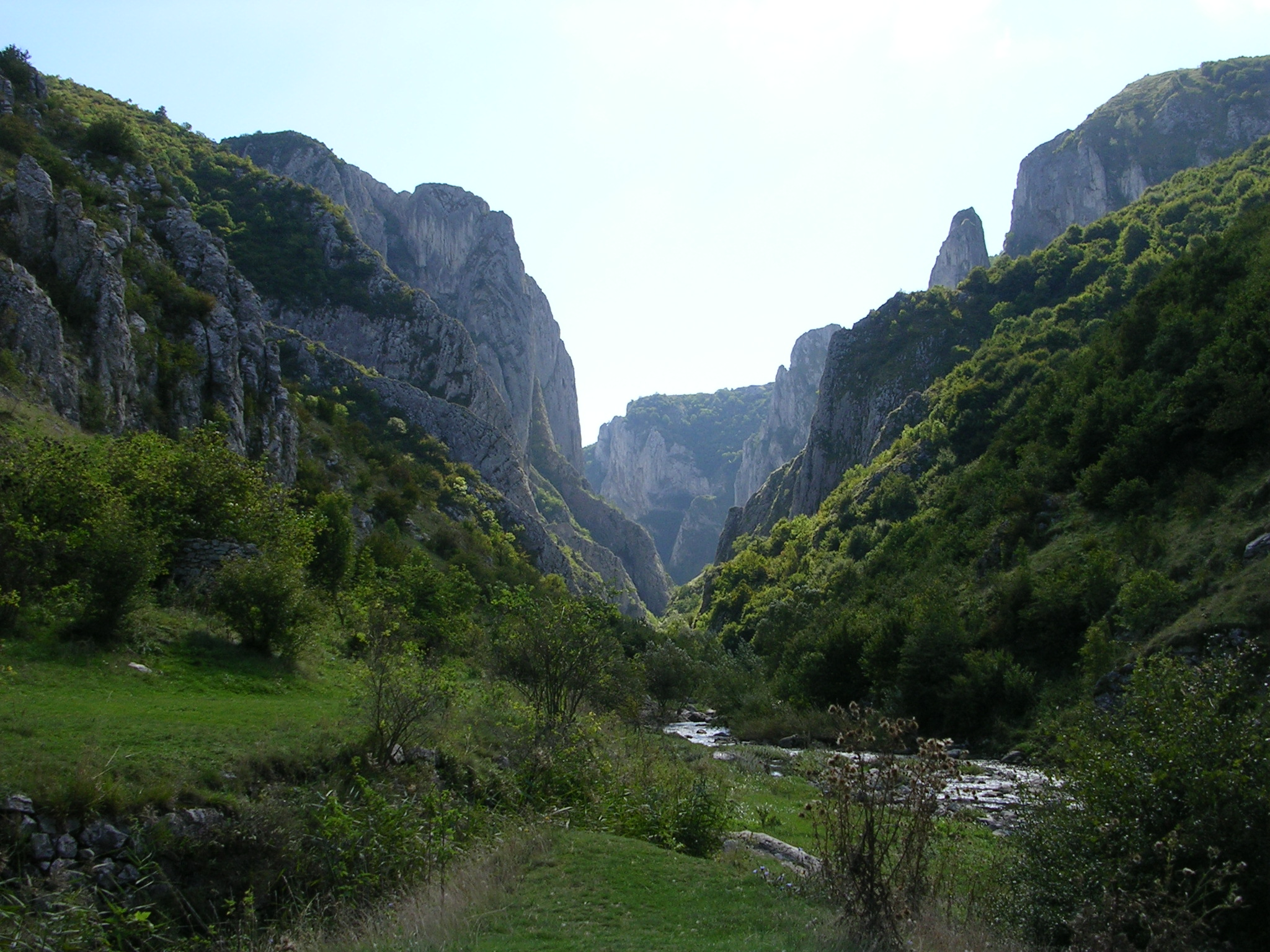
More than 1,000 plant species can be found in the Cheile Turzii reserve

The flora of Romania comprises around 3,450 species of vascular plants, which represents around 30% of the vascular flora of Europe.

The three major vegetation zones in Romania are the alpine, steppe, and forest zones. The latter can be subdivided (depending on soil, climate, and altitude) into regions dominated by the Norway Spruce, European beech, and various species of Oak, together with less widespread vegetation types such as the Dinaric calcareous block fir forest.

The Danube Delta is the largest continuous marshland in Europe. Vegetation in the marshland is dominated by reeds, with Willow, Poplar, Alder, and Oak on the higher ground. In 1991, this area became part of the UNESCO list of World Heritage Sites. The delta supports 1,688 different plant species.

The meadow-steppe grassland areas of Romania are also species-rich, but endangered.

Among the flora of Romania are medicinal plants such as Arnica montana, Primula veris, Tussilago farfara, and Atropa belladonna.

All the genera and species of plants found in Romania are listed in the 1977 work The Flora of Romania Illustrated Determinator of Vascular Plants.

== Kingdom Plantae ==
=== Division Pteridophyta ===
==== Class Lycopsida ====
Family	Genus	Species	Synonyms	Subspecies	Synonyms
Lycopodiaceae	1.(1) Huperzia (L.) Bernh.	1.(1) H. selago L.	Lycopodium selago L.	-	-
Lycopodiaceae	1.(2) Lycopodium L.	1.(2) L. clavatum	-	-	-
Lycopodiaceae	1.(2) Lycopodium L.	2.(3) L. annotinum L.	-	-	-
Lycopodiaceae	1.(2) Lycopodium L.	1.(4) L. inundatum L.	-	-	-
Lycopodiaceae	1.(2) Lycopodium L.	1.(5) L. complanatum L.	-	L. complanatum ssp. complanatum	L. complanatum ssp. anceps (Valir.) Milde
Lycopodiaceae	1.(2) Lycopodium L.	1.(5) L. complanatum L.	-	L. complanatum ssp. chamaeeyparissus (A.Br.) Doll,	L. tristachyum Pursh
Lycopodiaceae	1.(2) Lycopodium L.	1.(6) L. alpinum L.	-	-	-
Selaginellaceae	1.(3) Selaginella P.B.	1(7)S. selaginoides (L.)	S. spirulosa A. BR.	-	-
Selaginellaceae	1.(3) Selaginella P.B.	2(8)? S. helvetica (L.) Link	-	-	-
Iscëtaceae	1.(4)Isoëtes L.	1(9) ? I. lacustre L.	-	-	-
Iscëtaceae	1.(4)Isoëtes L.	2(10) ? I. setaceum Lam.	I. tenella Lam. ex Desv., I. echinospora Dur.	-	-

==== Class Sphenopsida ====
Family	Genus	Species	Synonyms	Subspecies	Synonyms
Equisetaceae	1.(5)Equisetum	1(11)E. telmatea Ehrh.	Equisetum maximum auct.	-	-
Equisetaceae	1.(5)Equisetum	2(12)E. arvense L.	-	-	-
Equisetaceae	1.(5)Equisetum	3(13)E. silvaticum L.	-	-	-
Equisetaceae	1.(5)Equisetum	4(14)E. fluviatile L. em. Ehrh.	Equisetum limnosum Ehrh.	-	-
Equisetaceae	1.(5)Equisetum	5(15) E. palustre L.	-	-	-
Equisetaceae	1.(5)Equisetum	6(16) E. ramosissimun Desf.	-	-	-
Equisetaceae	1.(5)Equisetum	7(17) E. pratense Ehrh.	-	-	-
Equisetaceae	1.(5)Equisetum	8(18) E. hyemale	-	-	-
Equisetaceae	1.(5)Equisetum	9(19) E. variegatum Schleich.	-	-	-
Equisetaceae	1.(5)Equisetum	E. X morel Newm. (= hyemale X ramosissimun)	-	-	-
Equisetaceae	1.(5)Equisetum	E. X naegelianum W. Koch (= ramosissimun X variegatum)	-	-	-

==== Class Filicopsida ====
Family	Genus	Species	Synonyms	Subspecies	Synonyms
Ophioglossaceae	1.(6) Ophioglossum L.	1(20) O. vulgatum L.	-	-	-
Ophioglossaceae	2.(7) Botrychium Sw.	1(21) B. lunaria L. Sw.	-	-	-
Ophioglossaceae	2.(7) Botrychium Sw.	2(22) B. matricariaefolium (Retz.) A. Br.	B. ramosum Aschers.	-	-
Ophioglossaceae	2.(7) Botrychium Sw.	3(23) B. multifidum (S. G. Gmel.) Rups.	B. rutaefolium A. Br.	-	-
Ophioglossaceae	2.(7) Botrychium Sw.	4(24) B. virginianum L. Sw.	-	-	-
Polypodiaceae	1.(8) Cheilanthes Schw.	1.(25)Cheilanthes marante L. Dom.	Notholaena marantae (L.) Desv.	-	-
Polypodiaceae	2.(9) Pteridium Scop.	1(26) P. aquilinum (L.) Kuhn.	Pteris aquiliana L.	-	-
Polypodiaceae	3.(10) Cryptogramma A. Br.	1(27) C. crispa (L.) R. Br.	Allosorus crispus (L.) Röhl	-	-
Polypodiaceae	4.(11) Blechnum	1(28) B. spicant (L.) Roth.	-	-	-
Polypodiaceae	5.(12) Phyllitis Hill	1(29) P. scolopendrium (L.) Newm.	Scolopendrium vulgare Sm.	-	-
Polypodiaceae	6.(13) Asplenium L.	1(30) A. trichomanes L.	-	A. trichomanes ssp. trichomanes	-
Polypodiaceae	6.(13) Asplenium L.	1(30) A. trichomanes L.	-	A. trichomanes ssp. quadrivalvus D. E. Meyer	-
Polypodiaceae	6.(13) Asplenium L.	2(31) A. viride Huds.	-	-	-
Polypodiaceae	6.(13) Asplenium L.	3(32) A. adulterinumMilde	-	-	-
Polypodiaceae	6.(13) Asplenium L.	4(33) A. septentrionale L. Hoffm	-	-	-
Polypodiaceae	6.(13) Asplenium L.	A. X alternifolium Wulf.	A. germanicum auct., A. septentrionale X trichomanes Wulf.	-	-
Polypodiaceae	6.(13) Asplenium L.	5(34) A. adiantum-nigrum L.	-	A. adiantum-nigrum ssp. serpentini (Tausch) Koch	A. cuneifolium Viv., A. Forsteri auct., non Sadl.
Polypodiaceae	6.(13) Asplenium L.	5(34) A. adiantum-nigrum L.	-	A. adiantum-nigrum ssp. onopteris L. Heufl.	A. onopteris L.
Polypodiaceae	6.(13) Asplenium L.	5(34) A. adiantum-nigrum L.	-	A. adiantum-nigrum ssp. adiantum-nigrum	-
Polypodiaceae	6.(13) Asplenium L.	6(35) A. lepidum C. Presl	-	-	-
Polypodiaceae	6.(13) Asplenium L.	7(36) A. ruta-muraria L.	-	-	-
Polypodiaceae	7.(14) Ceterach; A.P. Dc.	1(37) C. officinarum D.C.	Asplenium ceterach L.	-	-
Polypodiaceae	7.(14) Ceterach; A.P. Dc.	2(38) C. javorkeanum (Vida) Soö	-	-	-
Polypodiaceae	8.(15) Athyrium Roth	1(39) A. filix-femina (L.) Roth	-	-	-
Polypodiaceae	8.(15) Athyrium Roth	2(40) A. distentifolium Tausch	A. alpestre (Hoppe) Milde	-	-
Polypodiaceae	9.(16) Cystopteris Bernh	-	-	-	-
Polypodiaceae	10.(17) Woodsia R. Br.	-	-	-	-
Polypodiaceae	11.(18) Matteuccia Todaro	-	-	-	-
Polypodiaceae	12.(19) Dryopteris Adans.	-	-	-	-
Polypodiaceae	13.(20) Polystichum Roth	-	-	-	-
Polypodiaceae	14.(21) Polypodium L.	-	-	-	-
Marsileaceae	1.(22) Marsilea L.	-	-	-	-
Marsileaceae	2.(23) Pilularia L.	-	-	-	-
Salviniaceae	1.(24)Salvinia Adans.	-	-	-	-
Azollaceae	1.(25)Azolla Lam.	-	-	-	-

X = hybrid

? = Species which were no longer found in 1977.

=== Division Spermatophyta ===
==== Subdivision Gymnospermae ====
Class	Order	Family	Genus	.
Pinopsida	Pinales	Pinaceae	1.Abies Mill.	26
Pinopsida	Pinales	Pinaceae	2.Pseudotsuga Carr.	27
Pinopsida	Pinales	Pinaceae	3.Picea A.Dietr.	28
Pinopsida	Pinales	Pinaceae	4.Larix Mill.	29
Pinopsida	Pinales	Pinaceae	5.Pinus L.	30
Pinopsida	Pinales	Cupressaceae	1.Taxodium Rich.	31
Pinopsida	Pinales	Cupressaceae	2.Chamaecyparis Spach	32
Pinopsida	Pinales	Cupressaceae	3.Thuja L.	33
Pinopsida	Pinales	Cupressaceae	4.Juniperus L.	34
Pinopsida	Pinales	Taxaceae	Taxus L.	36
Gnetopsida	Gnetales	Ephedraceae	Ephedra L.//	37

==== Subdivision Angiospermae ====
===== Class Dicotyledoneae =====
====== Orders 1-25 ======
Order	Family	Genus
Salicales	Salicaceae	1. Salix L.
Salicales	Salicaceae	2. Populus L.
Juglandales	Juglandaceae	Juglans L.
Fagales	Betulaceae	1. Betula L.
Fagales	Betulaceae	2. Alnus Mill.
Fagales	Corylaceae	1. Carpinus L.
Fagales	Corylaceae	2. Corylus L.
Fagales	Fagaceae	1.Fagus L.
Fagales	Fagaceae	2. Castanea Mill.
Fagales	Fagaceae	3. Quercus L.
Urticales	Ulmaceae	Ulmus L.
Urticales	Moraceae	3. Morus L.
Urticales	Moraceae	4. Maclura Nutt.
Urticales	Moraceae	5. Ficus L.
Urticales	Cannabaceae	1. Humulus L.
Urticales	Cannabaceae	2. Cannabis L.
Urticales	Cannabaceae	3. Celtis L.
Urticales	Urticaceae	1. Urtica L.
Urticales	Urticaceae	2. Parietaria L.
Santalales	Santalaceae	1. Comandra Nutt.
Santalales	Santalaceae	2. Thesium L.
Santalales	Loranthaceae	Loranthus Jacq.
Santalales	Loranthaceae	2. Viscum L.
Aristolochiales	Aristolochiaceae	1. Asarum L.
Aristolochiales	Aristolochiaceae	2. Aristolochia L.
Polygonales	Polygonaceae	1. Polygonum L.
Polygonales	Polygonaceae	2. Bilderdykia Dumort.
Polygonales	Polygonaceae	3. Fagopyrum Mill.
Polygonales	Polygonaceae	4. Oxyria Hill
Polygonales	Polygonaceae	5. Rumex L.
Polygonales	Polygonaceae	6. Rheum L.//
Centrospermae	Chenopodiaceae	1. Polycnemum L.
Centrospermae	Chenopodiaceae	2. Beta L.
Centrospermae	Chenopodiaceae	3. Chenopodium L.
Centrospermae	Chenopodiaceae	4. Spinacia L.
Centrospermae	Chenopodiaceae	5. Atriplex L.
Centrospermae	Chenopodiaceae	6. Halimione Allen
Centrospermae	Chenopodiaceae	7. Krascheninnikovia Gauldenst.
Centrospermae	Chenopodiaceae	8. Ceratocarpus L.
Centrospermae	Chenopodiaceae	9. Camphorosma L.
Centrospermae	Chenopodiaceae	10. Bassia All.
Centrospermae	Chenopodiaceae	11. Kochia Roth
Centrospermae	Chenopodiaceae	12. Corispernum L.
Centrospermae	Chenopodiaceae	13. Halocnemum Bieb.
Centrospermae	Chenopodiaceae	14. Salicornia L.
Centrospermae	Chenopodiaceae	15. Suaeda Forsk.
Centrospermae	Chenopodiaceae	16. Salsola L.
Centrospermae	Chenopodiaceae	17. Petrosimonia Bunge
Centrospermae	Amaranthaceae	1. Amaranthus L.
Centrospermae	Amaranthaceae	2. Celosia L.
Centrospermae	Phytolaccaceae	Phytolacca L.
Centrospermae	Molluginaceae	1. Mollugo L.
Centrospermae	Molluginaceae	2. Glinus L.
Centrospermae	Portulacaceae	1. Portulaca L.
Centrospermae	Portulacaceae	2. Montia L.
Centrospermae	Caryophyllaceae	1. Arenaria L.
Centrospermae	Caryophyllaceae	2. Moehringia L.
Centrospermae	Caryophyllaceae	3. Minuartia Loefl. (in L.)
Centrospermae	Caryophyllaceae	4. Bufonia L.
Centrospermae	Caryophyllaceae	5. Holosteum L.
Centrospermae	Caryophyllaceae	6. Stellaria L.
Centrospermae	Caryophyllaceae	7. Cerastium L.
Centrospermae	Caryophyllaceae	8. Moenchia Ehrh.
Centrospermae	Caryophyllaceae	9. Myosoton Moench
Centrospermae	Caryophyllaceae	10. Sagina L.
Centrospermae	Caryophyllaceae	11. Scleranthus L.
Centrospermae	Caryophyllaceae	12. Paronychia Mill.
Centrospermae	Caryophyllaceae	13. Herniaria L.
Centrospermae	Caryophyllaceae	14. Polycarpon Loefl. ex. L.
Centrospermae	Caryophyllaceae	15. Spergula L.
Centrospermae	Caryophyllaceae	16. Spergularia (Pers.) J. et C. Presl
Centrospermae	Caryophyllaceae	17. Lychnis L.
Centrospermae	Caryophyllaceae	18. Silene L.
Centrospermae	Caryophyllaceae	19. Cucubalus L.
Centrospermae	Caryophyllaceae	20. Gypsophila L.
Centrospermae	Caryophyllaceae	21. Saponaria L.
Centrospermae	Caryophyllaceae	22. Vaccaria Medic.
Centrospermae	Caryophyllaceae	23. Dianthus L.
Ranales	Nymphaeaceae	1. Nymphaea L.
Ranales	Nymphaeaceae	2. Nuphar Sm.
Ranales	Ceratophyllaceae	Ceratophillum L.
Ranales	Ranunculaceae	1. Helleborus L.
Ranales	Ranunculaceae	2. Eranthis Salisb.
Ranales	Ranunculaceae	3. Callianthemum C.A. Mey.
Ranales	Ranunculaceae	4. Nigella L.
Ranales	Ranunculaceae	5. Trollius L.
Ranales	Ranunculaceae	6. Isopyrum L.
Ranales	Ranunculaceae	7. Actaea L.
Ranales	Ranunculaceae	8. Cimicifuga L.
Ranales	Ranunculaceae	9. Caltha L.
Ranales	Ranunculaceae	10. Aconitum L.
Ranales	Ranunculaceae	11. Delphinium L.
Ranales	Ranunculaceae	12. Consolida (DC.) S. F. Gray
Ranales	Ranunculaceae	13. Anemone L.
Ranales	Ranunculaceae	14. Hepatica Mill.
Ranales	Ranunculaceae	15. Pulsatilla Mill.
Ranales	Ranunculaceae	16. Clematis L.
Ranales	Ranunculaceae	17. Adonis L.
Ranales	Ranunculaceae	18. Ranunculus L.
Ranales	Ranunculaceae	19. Ceratocephalus Pers.
Ranales	Ranunculaceae	20. Myosurus L.
Ranales	Ranunculaceae	21. Aquilegia L.
Ranales	Ranunculaceae	22. Thalictrum L.
Ranales	Ranunculaceae	23. Paeonia L.
Ranales	Berberidaceae Spach	1. Gymnospermum
Ranales	Berberidaceae Spach	2. Berberis L.
Ranales	Berberidaceae Spach	3. Mahonia Nutt.
Rhocadales	Papaveraceae	1. Papaver L.
Rhocadales	Papaveraceae	2. Glaucium Mill.
Rhocadales	Papaveraceae	3. Chelidonium L.
Rhocadales	Papaveraceae	4. Corydalis Vwnt.
Rhocadales	Papaveraceae	5. Fumaria L.
Rhocadales	Cruciferae (Brassicaceae) >	1. Sisymbrium L.
Rhocadales	Cruciferae (Brassicaceae) >	2. Descurania Web et Benth.
Rhocadales	Cruciferae (Brassicaceae) >	3. Alliaria Scop.
Rhocadales	Cruciferae (Brassicaceae) >	4. Arabidopsis (DG.) Heinch.
Rhocadales	Cruciferae (Brassicaceae) >	5. Myagrum L.
Rhocadales	Cruciferae (Brassicaceae) >	6. Isatis L.
Rhocadales	Cruciferae (Brassicaceae) >	7. Bunias L.
Rhocadales	Cruciferae (Brassicaceae) >	8. Erysimum L.
Rhocadales	Cruciferae (Brassicaceae) >	9. Sirenia Andrez.
Rhocadales	Cruciferae (Brassicaceae) >	10. Hesperis L.
Rhocadales	Cruciferae (Brassicaceae) >	11. Cheiranthus L.
Rhocadales	Cruciferae (Brassicaceae) >	12. Mathiola R. Br.
Rhocadales	Cruciferae (Brassicaceae) >	13. Chorispora R. Br.
Rhocadales	Cruciferae (Brassicaceae) >	14. Euclidium R. Br.
Rhocadales	Cruciferae (Brassicaceae) >	15. Barbarea L.
Rhocadales	Cruciferae (Brassicaceae) >	16. Rorippa Scop
Rhocadales	Cruciferae (Brassicaceae) >	17. Armoracia Fabr.
Rhocadales	Cruciferae (Brassicaceae) >	18. Nasturtium R. Br.
Rhocadales	Cruciferae (Brassicaceae) >	19. Cardamine L.
Rhocadales	Cruciferae (Brassicaceae) >	20. Cardaminopsis (C. A. Mey.) Hay.
Rhocadales	Cruciferae (Brassicaceae) >	22. Arabis L.
Rhocadales	Cruciferae (Brassicaceae) >	23. Lunaria L.
Rhocadales	Cruciferae (Brassicaceae) >	24. Peltaria Jacq.
Rhocadales	Cruciferae (Brassicaceae) >	25. Alyssoides Mill.
Rhocadales	Cruciferae (Brassicaceae) >	26. Alyssum L.
Rhocadales	Cruciferae (Brassicaceae) >	27. Rerteroa DC
Rhocadales	Cruciferae (Brassicaceae) >	28. Schivereckia Andrz.
Rhocadales	Cruciferae (Brassicaceae) >	29. Draba L.
Rhocadales	Cruciferae (Brassicaceae) >	30. Erophila DC.
Rhocadales	Cruciferae (Brassicaceae) >	31. Petrocallis R. Br.
Rhocadales	Cruciferae (Brassicaceae) >	32. Cochlearia L.
Rhocadales	Cruciferae (Brassicaceae) >	33. Kernera Medic.
Rhocadales	Cruciferae (Brassicaceae) >	34. Camelina Cr.
Rhocadales	Cruciferae (Brassicaceae) >	35. Neslia Desv.
Rhocadales	Cruciferae (Brassicaceae) >	36. Capsella Medic
Rhocadales	Cruciferae (Brassicaceae) >	37. Hutchinsia R. Br.
Rhocadales	Cruciferae (Brassicaceae) >	38. Hornungia Rchb.
Rhocadales	Cruciferae (Brassicaceae) >	39. Teesdalia R. Br.
Rhocadales	Cruciferae (Brassicaceae) >	40. Thlaspi L.
Rhocadales	Cruciferae (Brassicaceae) >	41. Aethionema A. Br.
Rhocadales	Cruciferae (Brassicaceae) >	42. Iberis L.
Rhocadales	Cruciferae (Brassicaceae) >	43. Biscutella L.
Rhocadales	Cruciferae (Brassicaceae) >	44. Lepidium L.
Rhocadales	Cruciferae (Brassicaceae) >	45. Cardaria Desv.
Rhocadales	Cruciferae (Brassicaceae) >	46. Coronopus Hall.
Rhocadales	Cruciferae (Brassicaceae) >	47. Conrigia Adans.
Rhocadales	Cruciferae (Brassicaceae) >	48. Diplotaxis DC.
Rhocadales	Cruciferae (Brassicaceae) >	49. Brassica L.
Rhocadales	Cruciferae (Brassicaceae) >	50. Sinapis L.
Rhocadales	Cruciferae (Brassicaceae) >	51. Eruca Mill.
Rhocadales	Cruciferae (Brassicaceae) >	52. Erucastrum C. Presl.
Rhocadales	Cruciferae (Brassicaceae) >	53. Cakile Mill.
Rhocadales	Cruciferae (Brassicaceae) >	54. Rapistrum Cr.
Rhocadales	Cruciferae (Brassicaceae) >	55. Crambe L.
Rhocadales	Cruciferae (Brassicaceae) >	56. Calepina Adans.
Rhocadales	Cruciferae (Brassicaceae) >	57. Raphanus L.
Rhocadales	Resedaceae	1. Reseda L.
Sarraceniales	Droseraceae	1. Aldrovanda L.
Rosales	Crassulaceae	1. Sempervivum L.
Rosales	Crassulaceae	2. Sedum L.
Rosales	Crassulaceae	3. Rhodiola L.
Rosales	Saxifragaceae L.	1. Saxifraga
Rosales	Saxifragaceae L.	2. Chrysosplenium L.
Rosales	Saxifragaceae L.	3. Parnassia L.
Rosales	Saxifragaceae L.	4. Philadelphus L.
Rosales	Saxifragaceae L.	5. Ribes L.
Rosales	Platanaceae	Platanus
Rosales	Rosaceae	1. Spiraea
Rosales	Rosaceae	2. Aruncus L.
Rosales	Rosaceae	3. Filipendula Mill.
Rosales	Rosaceae	4. Rubus L.
Rosales	Rosaceae	5. Rosa L.
Rosales	Rosaceae	6. Agrimonia L.
Rosales	Rosaceae	7. Aremonia Nestler
Rosales	Rosaceae	8. Sanguisorba L.
Rosales	Rosaceae	9. Dryas L.
Rosales	Rosaceae	10. Geum L.
Rosales	Rosaceae	11. Waldsteinia Willd.
Rosales	Rosaceae	12. Potentilla L.
Rosales	Rosaceae	13. Fragaria L.
Rosales	Rosaceae	14. Alchemilla L.
Rosales	Rosaceae	15. Aphanes L.
Rosales	Rosaceae	16. Chaenomeles Lindl
Rosales	Rosaceae	17. Cydonia Mill.
Rosales	Rosaceae	18. Pyrus L.
Rosales	Rosaceae	19. Malus Mill.
Rosales	Rosaceae	20. Sorbus L.
Rosales	Rosaceae	21. Amelanchier Medic.
Rosales	Rosaceae	22. Cotoneaster Medic.
Rosales	Rosaceae	23. Mespilus L.
Rosales	Rosaceae	24. Crataegus L.
Rosales	Rosaceae	25. Prunus L.
Fabales	Leguminosae (Fabaceae)	1. Cercis L.
Fabales	Leguminosae (Fabaceae)	2. Gleditsia L.
Fabales	Leguminosae (Fabaceae)	3. Sophora L.
Fabales	Leguminosae (Fabaceae)	4. Laburnum Fabr.
Fabales	Leguminosae (Fabaceae)	5. Cytisus L. - Drob.
Fabales	Leguminosae (Fabaceae)	6. Genista L.
Fabales	Leguminosae (Fabaceae)	7. Spartium L.
Fabales	Leguminosae (Fabaceae)	8. Lupinus L. - Lupin Cafeluţe
Fabales	Leguminosae (Fabaceae)	9. Robinia L.
Fabales	Leguminosae (Fabaceae)	10. Wisteria Nutt.
Fabales	Leguminosae (Fabaceae)	11. Galega L.
Fabales	Leguminosae (Fabaceae)	12. Colutea L.
Fabales	Leguminosae (Fabaceae)	13. Caragana Fabr.
Fabales	Leguminosae (Fabaceae)	14. Astragalus L.
Fabales	Leguminosae (Fabaceae)	15. Oxytropis DC.
Fabales	Leguminosae (Fabaceae)	16. Glycyrrhiza L.
Fabales	Leguminosae (Fabaceae)	17. Amorpha L.
Fabales	Leguminosae (Fabaceae)	18. Psoralea L.
Fabales	Leguminosae (Fabaceae)	19. Phaseolus L.
Fabales	Leguminosae (Fabaceae)	20. Glycine Willd.
Fabales	Leguminosae (Fabaceae)	21. Cicer L.
Fabales	Leguminosae (Fabaceae)	22. Vicia L.
Fabales	Leguminosae (Fabaceae)	23. Lens Mill.
Fabales	Leguminosae (Fabaceae)	24. Lathyrus L.
Fabales	Leguminosae (Fabaceae)	25. Pisum L.
Fabales	Leguminosae (Fabaceae)	26. Ononis L.
Fabales	Leguminosae (Fabaceae)	27. Melilotus Mill.
Fabales	Leguminosae (Fabaceae)	28. Trigonella L.
Fabales	Leguminosae (Fabaceae)	29. Medicago L.
Fabales	Leguminosae (Fabaceae)	30. Trifolium L.
Fabales	Leguminosae (Fabaceae)	31. Dorycnium Mill.
Fabales	Leguminosae (Fabaceae)	32. Lotus L.
Fabales	Leguminosae (Fabaceae)	33. Tetragonolobus Scop.
Fabales	Leguminosae (Fabaceae)	34. Anthyllis L.
Fabales	Leguminosae (Fabaceae)	35. Ornithopus L.
Fabales	Leguminosae (Fabaceae)	36. Coronilla L.
Fabales	Leguminosae (Fabaceae)	37. Hippocrepis L.
Fabales	Leguminosae (Fabaceae)	38. Hedysarum L.
Fabales	Leguminosae (Fabaceae)	39. Onobrychis Mill.
Geraniales	Oxalidaceae	1. Oxalis L.
Geraniales	Geraniaceae	1. Geranium L.
Geraniales	Geraniaceae	2. Erodium L'Hér
Geraniales	Tropaeolaceae	Tropaeolum L.
Geraniales	Zygophyllaceae	1. Pegnanum L.
Geraniales	Zygophyllaceae	2. Zygophyllum L.
Geraniales	Zygophyllaceae	3. Tribulus L.
Geraniales	Zygophyllaceae	4. Nitraria L.
Geraniales	Linaceae	1. Linum L.
Geraniales	Linaceae	2. Radiola Hill
Geraniales	Euphorbiaceae	1. Mercurialis L.
Geraniales	Euphorbiaceae	2. Euphorbia L.
Rutales	Rutaceae	1. Ruta L.
Rutales	Rutaceae	2. Halophyllum A. Juss.
Rutales	Rutaceae	3. Dictamnus L.
Rutales	Simaroubaceae	Alianthus Desf.
Rutales	Poligonaceae	Polygala L.
Sapindales	Anacardiaceae	Cotinus Mill.
Sapindales	Hippocastanaceae	Aesculus L.
Sapindales	Balsaminaceae	Impatiens L.
Sapindales	Aquifoliaceae	Ilex L.
Celastrales	Celastracceae	Eonimus L.
Celastrales	Staphyleaceae	Staphylea L.
Celastrales	Buxaceae	Buxus L.
Rhamnales	Rhamnaceae	1. Paliurus Mill.
Rhamnales	Rhamnaceae	2. Ziziphus Mill.
Rhamnales	Rhamnaceae	3. Rhamnus L.
Rhamnales	Rhamnaceae	4. Frangula Mill.
Malvales	Tiliaceae	1. Tilia L., Tei
Malvales	Malvaceae	1. Malva L.
Malvales	Malvaceae	2. Lavatera L.
Malvales	Malvaceae	3. Althaea L.
Malvales	Malvaceae	4. Abution Mill.
Malvales	Malvaceae	5. Gossypium L., Bumbac
Malvales	Malvaceae	6. Hibiscus L.
Malvales	Malvaceae	7. Abelmoschus Moench
Thymelaeales	Thymelaeaceae	1. Daphne L.
Thymelaeales	Thymelaeaceae	2. Thymelaea Mill.
Thymelaeales	Elaeagnaceae	1. Hippophae L.
Thymelaeales	Elaeagnaceae	2. Elaeagnus L.
Gutiferales	Hypericaceae (Guttiferae)	Hypericum L.
Violales	Violaceae	Viola L.
Violales	Cistaceae	1. Helianthemum Mill.
Violales	Cistaceae	2. Fumana (Dunal) Spach
Violales	Tamaricaceae	1. Tamarix L.
Violales	Tamaricaceae	2. Myricaria Desv.
Violales	Frankeniaceae	Frankenia L.
Violales	Elatinaceae	Elatine L., Piperul apelor
Cucurbitales	Cucurbitaceae	1. Thladiantha Bunge
Cucurbitales	Cucurbitaceae	2. Ecbalium A. Rich.
Cucurbitales	Cucurbitaceae	3. Brionia L.
Cucurbitales	Cucurbitaceae	4. Citrullus Schrad.
Cucurbitales	Cucurbitaceae	5. Cucumis L.
Cucurbitales	Cucurbitaceae	6. Cucurbita L., Bostan, Dvleac
Cucurbitales	Cucurbitaceae	7. Lagenaria Ser.
Cucurbitales	Cucurbitaceae	8. Echinocystis Torr. et A. Gary
Cucurbitales	Cucurbitaceae	9. Sicyos L.
Myrtales	Lythraceae	1. Lythrum L.
Myrtales	Lythraceae	2. Peplis L.
Myrtales	Lythraceae	3. Ammannia L.
Myrtales	Trapaceae	Trapa L.
Myrtales	Onagraceae	1. Circaea L.
Myrtales	Onagraceae	2. Oenothera L.
Myrtales	Onagraceae	3. Ludwigia L.
Myrtales	Onagraceae	4. Epilobium L.
Myrtales	Haloragaceae	Myriophyllum L.
Myrtales	Hippuridaceae	Hippuris L.
Umbelliflorae	Cornaceae	Cornus L.
Umbelliflorae	Araliacceae	Hedera L.
Umbelliflorae	Umbelliferae (Apiaceae)	1. Sanicula L.
Umbelliflorae	Umbelliferae (Apiaceae)	2. Astrantia L.
Umbelliflorae	Umbelliferae (Apiaceae)	3. Eringium L.
Umbelliflorae	Umbelliferae (Apiaceae)	4. Echinophora L.
Umbelliflorae	Umbelliferae (Apiaceae)	5. Mirrhoides Heistre ex Fabr.; (Physocaulis (DC.) Tausch)
Umbelliflorae	Umbelliferae (Apiaceae)	6. Chaerophyllum L.
Umbelliflorae	Umbelliferae (Apiaceae)	7. Anthriscus Pers.
Umbelliflorae	Umbelliferae (Apiaceae)	8. Scandix L.
Umbelliflorae	Umbelliferae (Apiaceae)	9. Coriandrum L.
Umbelliflorae	Umbelliferae (Apiaceae)	10. Bifora Hoffm.
Umbelliflorae	Umbelliferae (Apiaceae)	11. Smyrnium L.
Umbelliflorae	Umbelliferae (Apiaceae)	12. Pimpinella L.
Umbelliflorae	Umbelliferae (Apiaceae)	13. Aegopodium L.
Umbelliflorae	Umbelliferae (Apiaceae)	14. Sium L.
Umbelliflorae	Umbelliferae (Apiaceae)	15. Berula Koch
Umbelliflorae	Umbelliferae (Apiaceae)	16. Crithmum L.
Umbelliflorae	Umbelliferae (Apiaceae)	17. Seseli L.
Umbelliflorae	Umbelliferae (Apiaceae)	18. Oenanthe L.
Umbelliflorae	Umbelliferae (Apiaceae)	19. Aethusa L.
Umbelliflorae	Umbelliferae (Apiaceae)	20. Athamanta L.
Umbelliflorae	Umbelliferae (Apiaceae)	21. Foeniculum Mill.
Umbelliflorae	Umbelliferae (Apiaceae)	22. Anethum L.
Umbelliflorae	Umbelliferae (Apiaceae)	23. Silaum Mill.
Umbelliflorae	Umbelliferae (Apiaceae)	24. Physospermum Cusson
Umbelliflorae	Umbelliferae (Apiaceae)	25. Conium L.
Umbelliflorae	Umbelliferae (Apiaceae)	26. Pleurospermum Hoffm.
Umbelliflorae	Umbelliferae (Apiaceae)	27. Cachrys L.
Umbelliflorae	Umbelliferae (Apiaceae)	28. Prangos L.
Umbelliflorae	Umbelliferae (Apiaceae)	29. Bupleurum L.
Umbelliflorae	Umbelliferae (Apiaceae)	30. Trinia Hofm.
Umbelliflorae	Umbelliferae (Apiaceae)	31. Apium L.
Umbelliflorae	Umbelliferae (Apiaceae)	32. Petroselinum Hill
Umbelliflorae	Umbelliferae (Apiaceae)	33. Sison L.
Umbelliflorae	Umbelliferae (Apiaceae)	34. Cicuta L.
Umbelliflorae	Umbelliferae (Apiaceae)	35. Falcaria Fabr.
Umbelliflorae	Umbelliferae (Apiaceae)	36. Carum L.
Umbelliflorae	Umbelliferae (Apiaceae)	37. Cnidium Guss.
Umbelliflorae	Umbelliferae (Apiaceae)	38. Selinium L.
Umbelliflorae	Umbelliferae (Apiaceae)	39. Ligusticum L.
Umbelliflorae	Umbelliferae (Apiaceae)	40. Conioselinum Hoffm.
Umbelliflorae	Umbelliferae (Apiaceae)	41. 1Angelica L.
Umbelliflorae	Umbelliferae (Apiaceae)	42. Levisticum Hill.
Umbelliflorae	Umbelliferae (Apiaceae)	43. Palimbia Bess.
Umbelliflorae	Umbelliferae (Apiaceae)	44. Ferula L.
Umbelliflorae	Umbelliferae (Apiaceae)	45. Ferulgo Koch
Umbelliflorae	Umbelliferae (Apiaceae)	46. Opopanax Koch
Umbelliflorae	Umbelliferae (Apiaceae)	47. Peucedanum L.
Umbelliflorae	Umbelliferae (Apiaceae)	48. Pastinaca L.
Umbelliflorae	Umbelliferae (Apiaceae)	49. Heracleum L.
Umbelliflorae	Umbelliferae (Apiaceae)	50. Malabaila Hoffm.
Umbelliflorae	Umbelliferae (Apiaceae)	51. Tordylium L.
Umbelliflorae	Umbelliferae (Apiaceae)	52. Laser Borch.
Umbelliflorae	Umbelliferae (Apiaceae)	53. Laserpitium L.
Umbelliflorae	Umbelliferae (Apiaceae)	54. Torilis Adans
Umbelliflorae	Umbelliferae (Apiaceae)	55. Astrodaucus Drude
Umbelliflorae	Umbelliferae (Apiaceae)	56. Caucalis L.
Umbelliflorae	Umbelliferae (Apiaceae)	57. Turgenia Hoffm.
Umbelliflorae	Umbelliferae (Apiaceae)	58. Orlaya Hoffm.
Umbelliflorae	Umbelliferae (Apiaceae)	59. Daucus L.

====== Orders 26-33 ======
Order	Family	Subfamily	Genus
Ericales	Pyrolaceae	-	1. Chimaphila Pursh
Ericales	Pyrolaceae	-	2. Moneses Salisb.
Ericales	Pyrolaceae	-	3. Orthilia Rafin
Ericales	Pyrolaceae	-	4. Pyrola L.
Ericales	Pyrolaceae	-	5. Monotropha L.
Ericales	Ericaceae	-	1. Rhododendron L.
Ericales	Ericaceae	-	2. Loiseleuria Desv.
Ericales	Ericaceae	-	3. Andromeda L.
Ericales	Ericaceae	-	4. Arctostaphylos Adans.
Ericales	Ericaceae	-	5. Vaccinium L.
Ericales	Ericaceae	-	6. Calluna Salisb.
Ericales	Ericaceae	-	7. Bruckenthalia Rehb.
Ericales	Empetraceae	-	1. Empetrum L.
Primulales	Primulaceae	-	1. Primula L.
Primulales	Primulaceae	-	2. Androsace L.
Primulales	Primulaceae	-	3. Cortusa L.
Primulales	Primulaceae	-	4. Soldanella L.
Primulales	Primulaceae	-	5. Cyclamen L.
Primulales	Primulaceae	-	6. Hottonia L.
Primulales	Primulaceae	-	7. Samolus L.
Primulales	Primulaceae	-	8. Lisimachia L.
Primulales	Primulaceae	-	9. Trientalis L.
Primulales	Primulaceae	-	10. Glaux L.
Primulales	Primulaceae	-	11. Anagallis L.
Primulales	Primulaceae	-	12. Centunculus L.
Plumbaginella	Plumbaginaceae	-	1. Plumbago L.
Plumbaginella	Plumbaginaceae	-	2. Limonium Mill.
Plumbaginella	Plumbaginaceae	-	3. Gonioliom Boiss.
Plumbaginella	Plumbaginaceae	-	4. AAarmeria (L.) Wllld.
Ligustrales	Oleaceae	-	1. Fraxinus L.
Ligustrales	Oleaceae	-	2. Jasminum L.
Ligustrales	Oleaceae	-	3. Ligustrum L.
Ligustrales	Oleaceae	-	4. Syringa L.
Ligustrales	Oleaceae	-	5. Forsythia Vahl
Gentianales (Contortae)	Gentianaceae	-	1. Menyanthes L.
Gentianales (Contortae)	Gentianaceae	-	2. Nymphoides Hill
Gentianales (Contortae)	Gentianaceae	-	3. Blackstonia Huds.
Gentianales (Contortae)	Gentianaceae	-	4. Centaurium Hill
Gentianales (Contortae)	Gentianaceae	-	5. Swertia L.
Gentianales (Contortae)	Gentianaceae	-	6. Lomatogonium A. Br.
Gentianales (Contortae)	Gentianaceae	-	7. Gentiana L.
Gentianales (Contortae)	Apoeynaceae	-	1. Vinca L., Saschiu
Gentianales (Contortae)	Asclepiadacceae	-	1. Periploca L.
Gentianales (Contortae)	Asclepiadacceae	-	2. Cynanchum L.
Gentianales (Contortae)	Rubiaceae	-	1. Sherardia L.
Gentianales (Contortae)	Rubiaceae	-	2. Asperula L.
Gentianales (Contortae)	Rubiaceae	-	3. Crucianella L.
Gentianales (Contortae)	Rubiaceae	-	4. Cruciata Scop.
Gentianales (Contortae)	Rubiaceae	-	5. Galium L.
Gentianales (Contortae)	Rubiaceae	-	6. Rubia L.
Tubiflorales (Lamiales)	Polemoniaceae	-	1. Polemonium L.
Tubiflorales (Lamiales)	Convolvulaceae	-	1. Convolvulus L.
Tubiflorales (Lamiales)	Convolvulaceae	-	2. Calystegia R. Br.
Tubiflorales (Lamiales)	Cuscutaceae	-	1. Cuscuta L., Torţel
Tubiflorales (Lamiales)	Boraginaceae	-	1. Argusia Boehmer
Tubiflorales (Lamiales)	Boraginaceae	-	2. Heliotropium L.
Tubiflorales (Lamiales)	Boraginaceae	-	3. Onosoma L., Otrăţel
Tubiflorales (Lamiales)	Boraginaceae	-	4. Cerinthe L., Pidosnic
Tubiflorales (Lamiales)	Boraginaceae	-	5. Echium L.
Tubiflorales (Lamiales)	Boraginaceae	-	6. Rochelia Rchb.
Tubiflorales (Lamiales)	Boraginaceae	-	7. Lithosphermum L.
Tubiflorales (Lamiales)	Boraginaceae	-	8. Myosotis L.
Tubiflorales (Lamiales)	Boraginaceae	-	9. Asperugo L.
Tubiflorales (Lamiales)	Boraginaceae	-	10. Lappula Fabric.
Tubiflorales (Lamiales)	Boraginaceae	-	11. Eritrichium Schrad.
Tubiflorales (Lamiales)	Boraginaceae	-	12. Rindera Pall.
Tubiflorales (Lamiales)	Boraginaceae	-	13. Omphalodes Mill.
Tubiflorales (Lamiales)	Boraginaceae	-	14. Cynoglossum L.
Tubiflorales (Lamiales)	Boraginaceae	-	15. Pulmonaria L.
Tubiflorales (Lamiales)	Boraginaceae	-	16. Nonea Medick.
Tubiflorales (Lamiales)	Boraginaceae	-	17. Alkanna Tausch
Tubiflorales (Lamiales)	Boraginaceae	-	18. Anchusa L.
Tubiflorales (Lamiales)	Boraginaceae	-	19. Lycopsis L.
Tubiflorales (Lamiales)	Boraginaceae	-	20. Symphytum L.
Tubiflorales (Lamiales)	Boraginaceae	-	21. Borago L.
Tubiflorales (Lamiales)	Verbenaceae	-	1. Verbena L.
Tubiflorales (Lamiales)	Callitrichaceae	-	1. Callitriche L.
Tubiflorales (Lamiales)	Labiatae	-	1. Ajuga L.
Tubiflorales (Lamiales)	Labiatae	-	2. Teucrium L.
Tubiflorales (Lamiales)	Labiatae	-	3. Scutellaria L.
Tubiflorales (Lamiales)	Labiatae	-	4. Marriubrium L.
Tubiflorales (Lamiales)	Labiatae	-	5. Sideritis L.
Tubiflorales (Lamiales)	Labiatae	-	6. Nepeta L.
Tubiflorales (Lamiales)	Labiatae	-	7. Glechoma L.
Tubiflorales (Lamiales)	Labiatae	-	8. Dracocephalum L.
Tubiflorales (Lamiales)	Labiatae	-	9. Prunella L.
Tubiflorales (Lamiales)	Labiatae	-	10. Melittis L.
Tubiflorales (Lamiales)	Labiatae	-	11. Phlomis L.
Tubiflorales (Lamiales)	Labiatae	-	12. Galeopsis L.
Tubiflorales (Lamiales)	Labiatae	-	13. Lamium L.
Tubiflorales (Lamiales)	Labiatae	-	14. Ballota L.
Tubiflorales (Lamiales)	Labiatae	-	15. Leonurus L.
Tubiflorales (Lamiales)	Labiatae	-	16. Betonica L.
Tubiflorales (Lamiales)	Labiatae	-	17. Stachys L.
Tubiflorales (Lamiales)	Labiatae	-	18. Salvia L.
Tubiflorales (Lamiales)	Labiatae	-	19. Ziziphora L.
Tubiflorales (Lamiales)	Labiatae	-	20. Mellisa L.
Tubiflorales (Lamiales)	Labiatae	-	21. Satureja L.
Tubiflorales (Lamiales)	Labiatae	-	22. Calamintha Adans.
Tubiflorales (Lamiales)	Labiatae	-	23. Micromeria Benth.
Tubiflorales (Lamiales)	Labiatae	-	24. Origanum L.
Tubiflorales (Lamiales)	Labiatae	-	25. Thymus L.
Tubiflorales (Lamiales)	Labiatae	-	26. Lycopus L.
Tubiflorales (Lamiales)	Labiatae	-	27. Mentha L., Izmă
Tubiflorales (Lamiales)	Labiatae	-	28. Elsholtzia Wild.
Tubiflorales (Lamiales)	Solanaceae	-	1. Nicandra Adans.
Tubiflorales (Lamiales)	Solanaceae	-	2. Lycium L.
Tubiflorales (Lamiales)	Solanaceae	-	3. Atropa L.
Tubiflorales (Lamiales)	Solanaceae	-	4. Scopolia Jacq.
Tubiflorales (Lamiales)	Solanaceae	-	5. Hyoscyamus L.
Tubiflorales (Lamiales)	Solanaceae	-	6. Physalis L.
Tubiflorales (Lamiales)	Solanaceae	-	7. Solanum L.
Tubiflorales (Lamiales)	Solanaceae	-	8. Lycopersicon Mill.
Tubiflorales (Lamiales)	Solanaceae	-	10. Capsicum L.
Tubiflorales (Lamiales)	Solanaceae	-	11. Nicotina L.
Tubiflorales (Lamiales)	Scrophulariaceae	-	1. Verbascum L.
Tubiflorales (Lamiales)	Scrophulariaceae	-	2. Kickxia Dum.
Tubiflorales (Lamiales)	Scrophulariaceae	-	3. Cymbalaria Hill.
Tubiflorales (Lamiales)	Scrophulariaceae	-	4. Chaenorrhinum Lange
Tubiflorales (Lamiales)	Scrophulariaceae	-	5. Linaria Mill.
Tubiflorales (Lamiales)	Scrophulariaceae	-	7. Misopates Rafin.
Tubiflorales (Lamiales)	Scrophulariaceae	-	8. Scrophularia L.
Tubiflorales (Lamiales)	Scrophulariaceae	-	9. Mimulus L.
Tubiflorales (Lamiales)	Scrophulariaceae	-	10. Gratiola L.
Tubiflorales (Lamiales)	Scrophulariaceae	-	11. Limosella L.
Tubiflorales (Lamiales)	Scrophulariaceae	-	12. Lindernia All.
Tubiflorales (Lamiales)	Scrophulariaceae	-	13. Veronica L.
Tubiflorales (Lamiales)	Scrophulariaceae	-	14. Digitalis L.
Tubiflorales (Lamiales)	Scrophulariaceae	-	15. Melamphyum L.
Tubiflorales (Lamiales)	Scrophulariaceae	-	16. Tozzia L.
Tubiflorales (Lamiales)	Scrophulariaceae	-	17. Euphrasia L.
Tubiflorales (Lamiales)	Scrophulariaceae	-	18. Odontites Zinn.
Tubiflorales (Lamiales)	Scrophulariaceae	-	19. Rhinanthus L., Clocotici
Tubiflorales (Lamiales)	Scrophulariaceae	-	20. Bartsia L.
Tubiflorales (Lamiales)	Scrophulariaceae	-	21. Pedicularis L.
Tubiflorales (Lamiales)	Scrophulariaceae	-	22. Lathraea L.
Tubiflorales (Lamiales)	Globulariaceae	-	Globularia L.
Tubiflorales (Lamiales)	Bignoniaceae	-	Catalpa Scop.
Tubiflorales (Lamiales)	Acanthaceae	-	Acanthus L.
Tubiflorales (Lamiales)	Orobanchaceae	-	Orobanche L.
Tubiflorales (Lamiales)	Lentibulariaceae	-	1. Pinguicula L., Foaie grasă
Tubiflorales (Lamiales)	Lentibulariaceae	-	2. Utricularia L., Otrăţel de apă
Tubiflorales (Lamiales)	Plantaginaceae	-	1. Plantago L.
Tubiflorales (Lamiales)	Plantaginaceae	-	2. Littorella Bergius
Dipsacales	Caprifoliaceae	-	1. Sambucus L.
Dipsacales	Caprifoliaceae	-	2. Viburnum L.
Dipsacales	Caprifoliaceae	-	3. Symphoricarpos Duhamel
Dipsacales	Caprifoliaceae	-	4. Linnaea Gron.
Dipsacales	Caprifoliaceae	-	5. Lonicera L.
Dipsacales	Adoxaceae	-	Adoxa L.
Dipsacales	Valerianaceae	-	1. Valerianella Moench
Dipsacales	Valerianaceae	-	2. Valeriana L.
Dipsacales	Dipsacaceae	-	1. Dipsacus L.
Dipsacales	Dipsacaceae	-	2. Cephalaria Schrad.
Dipsacales	Dipsacaceae	-	3. Knautia L.
Dipsacales	Dipsacaceae	-	4. Succisa L.
Dipsacales	Dipsacaceae	-	5. Succisella Beck
Dipsacales	Dipsacaceae	-	6. Scabiosa L.
Asterales Synandrae	Campanulaceae	-	1. Campanula L.
Asterales Synandrae	Campanulaceae	-	2. Symphyandra A. Dc.
Asterales Synandrae	Campanulaceae	-	3. Adenophora Fisch.
Asterales Synandrae	Campanulaceae	-	4. Leegousia Dur.
Asterales Synandrae	Campanulaceae	-	5. Asyneuma Gris. et. Sch.
Asterales Synandrae	Campanulaceae	-	6. Phyteuma L.
Asterales Synandrae	Campanulaceae	-	7. Edraianthus A. Dc.
Asterales Synandrae	Campanulaceae	-	8. Jasione L.
Asterales Synandrae	Compositae (Asteraceae)	Tubuliflorales	1. Eupatorium L.
Asterales Synandrae	Compositae (Asteraceae)	Tubuliflorales	2. Adenostyles Cass.
Asterales Synandrae	Compositae (Asteraceae)	Tubuliflorales	3. Solidago L.
Asterales Synandrae	Compositae (Asteraceae)	Tubuliflorales	4. Bellis L.
Asterales Synandrae	Compositae (Asteraceae)	Tubuliflorales	5. Aster L.
Asterales Synandrae	Compositae (Asteraceae)	Tubuliflorales	6. Erigeron L.
Asterales Synandrae	Compositae (Asteraceae)	Tubuliflorales	7. Micropus L.
Asterales Synandrae	Compositae (Asteraceae)	Tubuliflorales	8. Filago L.
Asterales Synandrae	Compositae (Asteraceae)	Tubuliflorales	9. Antennaria Gaertn.
Asterales Synandrae	Compositae (Asteraceae)	Tubuliflorales	10. Leontopodium (Pers) R. Br.
Asterales Synandrae	Compositae (Asteraceae)	Tubuliflorales	11. Ganphalium L.
Asterales Synandrae	Compositae (Asteraceae)	Tubuliflorales	12. Helichrysum Mill.
Asterales Synandrae	Compositae (Asteraceae)	Tubuliflorales	13. Inula L.
Asterales Synandrae	Compositae (Asteraceae)	Tubuliflorales	14. Teelchia Baumg
Asterales Synandrae	Compositae (Asteraceae)	Tubuliflorales	15. Pulicaria Gaertn.
Asterales Synandrae	Compositae (Asteraceae)	Tubuliflorales	16. Carpesium L.
Asterales Synandrae	Compositae (Asteraceae)	Tubuliflorales	17. Ambrosia L.
Asterales Synandrae	Compositae (Asteraceae)	Tubuliflorales	18. Iva L.
Asterales Synandrae	Compositae (Asteraceae)	Tubuliflorales	19. Sigesbechia L.
Asterales Synandrae	Compositae (Asteraceae)	Tubuliflorales	20. Xanthium L.
Asterales Synandrae	Compositae (Asteraceae)	Tubuliflorales	21. Rudbeckia L.
Asterales Synandrae	Compositae (Asteraceae)	Tubuliflorales	22. Helianthus L.
Asterales Synandrae	Compositae (Asteraceae)	Tubuliflorales	23. Bidens L.
Asterales Synandrae	Compositae (Asteraceae)	Tubuliflorales	24. Galinsoga Ruiz et Pavon
Asterales Synandrae	Compositae (Asteraceae)	Tubuliflorales	25. Anthemis L.
Asterales Synandrae	Compositae (Asteraceae)	Tubuliflorales	26. Achillea L.
Asterales Synandrae	Compositae (Asteraceae)	Tubuliflorales	27. Matricaria L.
Asterales Synandrae	Compositae (Asteraceae)	Tubuliflorales	28. Tripleurospermum Schultz-Bip.
Asterales Synandrae	Compositae (Asteraceae)	Tubuliflorales	29. Tanacetum L.
Asterales Synandrae	Compositae (Asteraceae)	Tubuliflorales	30. Chrysanthemum L.
Asterales Synandrae	Compositae (Asteraceae)	Tubuliflorales	31. Artemisia L., Pelin
Asterales Synandrae	Compositae (Asteraceae)	Tubuliflorales	32. Tussilago L.
Asterales Synandrae	Compositae (Asteraceae)	Tubuliflorales	33. Petasites L.
Asterales Synandrae	Compositae (Asteraceae)	Tubuliflorales	34. Homogyne Cass.
Asterales Synandrae	Compositae (Asteraceae)	Tubuliflorales	35. Erechtites Raf.
Asterales Synandrae	Compositae (Asteraceae)	Tubuliflorales	36. Arnica L.
Asterales Synandrae	Compositae (Asteraceae)	Tubuliflorales	37. Doronicum L.
Asterales Synandrae	Compositae (Asteraceae)	Tubuliflorales	38. Senecio L.
Asterales Synandrae	Compositae (Asteraceae)	Tubuliflorales	39. Ligularia Cass.
Asterales Synandrae	Compositae (Asteraceae)	Tubuliflorales	40. Calendula L., Filimică
Asterales Synandrae	Compositae (Asteraceae)	Tubuliflorales	41. Echinops L.
Asterales Synandrae	Compositae (Asteraceae)	Tubuliflorales	42. Xeranthemum L.
Asterales Synandrae	Compositae (Asteraceae)	Tubuliflorales	43. Carlina L.
Asterales Synandrae	Compositae (Asteraceae)	Tubuliflorales	44. Arctium L., Btustur
Asterales Synandrae	Compositae (Asteraceae)	Tubuliflorales	45. Saussurea DC.
Asterales Synandrae	Compositae (Asteraceae)	Tubuliflorales	46. Jurinea L.
Asterales Synandrae	Compositae (Asteraceae)	Tubuliflorales	47. Carduus L.
Asterales Synandrae	Compositae (Asteraceae)	Tubuliflorales	48. Cirsium Mill.
Asterales Synandrae	Compositae (Asteraceae)	Tubuliflorales	49. Onopordum L.
Asterales Synandrae	Compositae (Asteraceae)	Tubuliflorales	50. Crupina Cass.
Asterales Synandrae	Compositae (Asteraceae)	Tubuliflorales	51. Serratula L.
Asterales Synandrae	Compositae (Asteraceae)	Tubuliflorales	52. Centaurea L.
Asterales Synandrae	Compositae (Asteraceae)	Tubuliflorales	53. Leuzea DC.
Asterales Synandrae	Compositae (Asteraceae)	Tubuliflorales	54. Carthamus L.
Asterales Synandrae	Compositae (Asteraceae)	Liguliflorae	55. Scolymus L.
Asterales Synandrae	Compositae (Asteraceae)	Liguliflorae	56. Cichorium L.
Asterales Synandrae	Compositae (Asteraceae)	Liguliflorae	57. Lapsana L.
Asterales Synandrae	Compositae (Asteraceae)	Liguliflorae	58. Aposeris Neck.
Asterales Synandrae	Compositae (Asteraceae)	Liguliflorae	59. Hypochoeris L.
Asterales Synandrae	Compositae (Asteraceae)	Liguliflorae	60. Leontodon L.
Asterales Synandrae	Compositae (Asteraceae)	Liguliflorae	61. Picris L.
Asterales Synandrae	Compositae (Asteraceae)	Liguliflorae	62. Tragopogon L.
Asterales Synandrae	Compositae (Asteraceae)	Liguliflorae	63. Scorzonera L.
Asterales Synandrae	Compositae (Asteraceae)	Liguliflorae	64. Podospermum DC.
Asterales Synandrae	Compositae (Asteraceae)	Liguliflorae	65. Lagoseris Bieb.
Asterales Synandrae	Compositae (Asteraceae)	Liguliflorae	66. Chondrilla L.
Asterales Synandrae	Compositae (Asteraceae)	Liguliflorae	67. Taraxacum L. - Păpădie
Asterales Synandrae	Compositae (Asteraceae)	Liguliflorae	68. Cicerbita Wallr.
Asterales Synandrae	Compositae (Asteraceae)	Liguliflorae	69. Sonchus L. - Susai
Asterales Synandrae	Compositae (Asteraceae)	Liguliflorae	70. Mycelis Cass.
Asterales Synandrae	Compositae (Asteraceae)	Liguliflorae	71. Lactuca L.
Asterales Synandrae	Compositae (Asteraceae)	Liguliflorae	72. Crepis L.
Asterales Synandrae	Compositae (Asteraceae)	Liguliflorae	73. Prenanthes L.
Asterales Synandrae	Compositae (Asteraceae)	Liguliflorae	74. Hieracium L.

===== Class Monocotyledonatae =====
Order	Family	Subfamily	Genus		
Helebiales	Alismataceae	-	1. Alisma L.		
Helebiales	Alismataceae	-	2. Caldesia Parl		
Helebiales	Alismataceae	-	3. Sagittaria L.		
Helebiales	Butomaceae	-	Butomus L.		
Helebiales	Hydroecharitaceae	-	1. Vallisneria L.		
Helebiales	Hydroecharitaceae	-	2. Elodea L. C. Rich.		
Helebiales	Hydroecharitaceae	-	3. Stratiotes L.		
Helebiales	Hydroecharitaceae	-	4. Hydrocharis L.		
Helebiales	Juncaginaceae	-	Triglochin L.		
Helebiales	Scheuchzeria	-	Scheuchzeria L.		
Helebiales	Potamogetonaceae	-	1. Potamogeton L. - Broscariţă		
Helebiales	Potamogetonaceae	-	2. Groenlandia J. Gay		
Helebiales	Potamogetonaceae	-	3. Ruppia L.		
Helebiales	Zosteraceae	-	Zostera L.		
Helebiales	Zannichelliaceae	-	Zannichellia L.		
Helebiales	Najadaceae	-	Najas L.		
Pandanales	Typhaceae	-	Typha L. - Papură		
Pandanales	Spargniaceae	-	Sparganium L.		
Liliiflorales	Liliaceae	-	1. Tofieldia Huds.		
Liliiflorales	Liliaceae	-	2. Bulbocodium L.		
Liliiflorales	Liliaceae	-	3. Colchicum L.		
Liliiflorales	Liliaceae	-	4. Merendera Ramound		
Liliiflorales	Liliaceae	-	5. Veratrum L.		
Liliiflorales	Liliaceae	-	6. Asphodeline Rchb.		
Liliiflorales	Liliaceae	-	7. Anthericum L.		
Liliiflorales	Liliaceae	-	8. Gagea Salisb. (including Lloydia)		
Liliiflorales	Liliaceae	-	9. Hemerocallis L. - Crin galben		
Liliiflorales	Liliaceae	-	10. Allium L.		
Liliiflorales	Liliaceae	-	11. Nectaroscordum Lindl.		
Liliiflorales	Liliaceae	-	12. Lilium L. - Crin		
Liliiflorales	Liliaceae	-	13. Hyacinthella Schur		
Liliiflorales	Liliaceae	-	14. Bellevalia Lapeyr.		
Liliiflorales	Liliaceae	-	15. Fritillaria L. - Bibilică		
Liliiflorales	Liliaceae	-	16. Tulipa L. - Lalea		
Liliiflorales	Liliaceae	-	17. Erythronium L.		
Liliiflorales	Liliaceae	-	18. Scilla L.		
Liliiflorales	Liliaceae	-	19. Ornithogalum L.		
Liliiflorales	Liliaceae	-	20. Muscari Mill.		
Liliiflorales	Liliaceae	-	21. Asparagus L.		
Liliiflorales	Liliaceae	-	22. Ruscus L.		
Liliiflorales	Liliaceae	-	23. Maianthemum Web.		
Liliiflorales	Liliaceae	-	24. Polygonatum Adans. - Coada cocoşului		
Liliiflorales	Liliaceae	-	25. Streptopus L. C. Rich.		
Liliiflorales	Liliaceae	-	26. Concallaria L.		
Liliiflorales	Liliaceae	-	27. Paris L.		
Liliiflorales	Liliaceae	-	Amaryllidaceae	-	1. Galanthus L. - Ghioccel
Liliiflorales	2. Leucojum L.		Amaryllidaceae	-	
Liliiflorales	3. Sternbergia W. et K.		Amaryllidaceae	-	
Liliiflorales	4. Narcissus L.		Amaryllidaceae	-	
Liliiflorales	Dioscoreaceae	-	Tamus L.		
Liliiflorales	Iridaceae	-	1. Crocus L.		
Liliiflorales	Iridaceae	-	2. Sisyrinchium L.		
Liliiflorales	Iridaceae	-	3. Iris L.		
Liliiflorales	Iridaceae	-	4. Gladiolus L.		
Liliiflorales	Juncaceae	-	1. Juncus L.		
Liliiflorales	Juncaceae	-	2. Luzula DC.		
Liliiflorales	Cyperales	Cyperaceae	-	1. Cyperus L.	
2. Fimbristylis Vahl	Cyperales	Cyperaceae	-		
3. Eriophorum L. - Bumbăcariţă	Cyperales	Cyperaceae	-		
4. Eleocharis (Heleocharis) R. Br. - Pipiriguţ	Cyperales	Cyperaceae	-		
5. Schoenoplectus (Rehb.) Palla	Cyperales	Cyperaceae	-		
6. Isolepis R. Br.	Cyperales	Cyperaceae	-		
7. Holoschoenus Link	Cyperales	Cyperaceae	-		
8. Bolboschoenus (Aschers) Palla	Cyperales	Cyperaceae	-		
9. Scirpus L.	Cyperales	Cyperaceae	-		
10. Blysmus Panzer	Cyperales	Cyperaceae	-		
11. Schoenus L.	Cyperales	Cyperaceae	-		
12. Cladium P. Browne	Cyperales	Cyperaceae	-		
13. Rhynchospora Vahl	Cyperales	Cyperaceae	-		
14. Kobresia Willd	Cyperales	Cyperaceae	-		
15. Elyna Schrad.	Cyperales	Cyperaceae	-		
16. Carex L. - Rogoz	Cyperales	Cyperaceae	-		
Graminales	Graminaceae(Poaceae)	-	1. Zea L.		
Graminales	Graminaceae(Poaceae)	-	2. Bothriochloa O. Ktze.		
Graminales	Graminaceae(Poaceae)	-	3. Chrysopogon Trin.		
Graminales	Graminaceae(Poaceae)	-	4. Sorghum Moench		
Graminales	Graminaceae(Poaceae)	-	5. Erianthus L. C. Rich.		
Graminales	Graminaceae(Poaceae)	-	6. Tragus Hall.		
Graminales	Graminaceae(Poaceae)	-	7. Panicum L.		
Graminales	Graminaceae(Poaceae)	-	8. Echinochloa P. Beauv.		
Graminales	Graminaceae(Poaceae)	-	9. Digitaria Fabr.		
Graminales	Graminaceae(Poaceae)	-	10. Setaria P. Beauv		
Graminales	Graminaceae(Poaceae)	-	11. Leersia Sw.		
Graminales	Graminaceae(Poaceae)	-	12. Oryza L.		
Graminales	Graminaceae(Poaceae)	-	13. Phalaris L.		
Graminales	Graminaceae(Poaceae)	-	14. Typhoides Moench		
Graminales	Graminaceae(Poaceae)	-	15. Anthoxanthum L.		
Graminales	Graminaceae(Poaceae)	-	16. Hierochloe R. Br. - Iarba Sfintei Mării		
Graminales	Graminaceae(Poaceae)	-	17. Stipa L.		
Graminales	Graminaceae(Poaceae)	-	18. Aristella Bertol.		
Graminales	Graminaceae(Poaceae)	-	19. Acnatherum P. Beauv.		
Graminales	Graminaceae(Poaceae)	-	20. Milium L.		
Graminales	Graminaceae(Poaceae)	-	21. Oryzopsis L. C. Rich.		
Graminales	Graminaceae(Poaceae)	-	22. Phleum L.		
Graminales	Graminaceae(Poaceae)	-	23. Alopecurus L.		
Graminales	Graminaceae(Poaceae)	-	24. Crypsis W. Ait.		
Graminales	Graminaceae(Poaceae)	-	25. Heleochloa Host		
Graminales	Graminaceae(Poaceae)	-	26. Polypogon Desf.		
Graminales	Graminaceae(Poaceae)	-	27. Gastridium P. Beauv.		
Graminales	Graminaceae(Poaceae)	-	28. Sporobolus R. Br.		
Graminales	Graminaceae(Poaceae)	-	29. Agrostis L.		
Graminales	Graminaceae(Poaceae)	-	30. Apera Adans.		
Graminales	Graminaceae(Poaceae)	-	31. Calamagrostis Adans.		
Graminales	Graminaceae(Poaceae)	-	32. Ammophila Host		
Graminales	Graminaceae(Poaceae)	-	33. Holcus L.		
Graminales	Graminaceae(Poaceae)	-	34. Aira L.		
Graminales	Graminaceae(Poaceae)	-	35. Corynephorus P. Beauv.		
Graminales	Graminaceae(Poaceae)	-	36. Deschampsia P. Beauv.		
Graminales	Graminaceae(Poaceae)	-	37. Trisetum Pers.		
Graminales	Graminaceae(Poaceae)	-	38. Ventenata Koel.		
Graminales	Graminaceae(Poaceae)	-	39. Arrhenatherum P. Beauv.		
Graminales	Graminaceae(Poaceae)	-	40. Helictotrichon Bess. (Avenastrum Jessen p.p., Avenochloa Holub)		
Graminales	Graminaceae(Poaceae)	-	41. Avena L.		
Graminales	Graminaceae(Poaceae)	-	42. Danthonia DC.		
Graminales	Graminaceae(Poaceae)	-	43. Sieglingia Bernh.		
Graminales	Graminaceae(Poaceae)	-	44. Sesleria Scop.		
Graminales	Graminaceae(Poaceae)	-	45. Oreochloa Link		
Graminales	Graminaceae(Poaceae)	-	46. Phragmites Adans.		
Graminales	Graminaceae(Poaceae)	-	47. Molinia Schrank		
Graminales	Graminaceae(Poaceae)	-	48. Cleistogenes Kegn		
Graminales	Graminaceae(Poaceae)	-	49. Eragrostis P. Beauv.		
Graminales	Graminaceae(Poaceae)	-	50. Koeleria Pers.		
Graminales	Graminaceae(Poaceae)	-	51. Catabrosa P. Beauv.		
Graminales	Graminaceae(Poaceae)	-	52. Melica L.		
Graminales	Graminaceae(Poaceae)	-	53. Briza L.		
Graminales	Graminaceae(Poaceae)	-	54. Dactylis L.		
Graminales	Graminaceae(Poaceae)	-	55. Aeluropus Trin.		
Graminales	Graminaceae(Poaceae)	-	56. Cynosurus L.		
Graminales	Graminaceae(Poaceae)	-	57. Sclerochloa P. Beauv.		
Graminales	Graminaceae(Poaceae)	-	58. Poa L.		
Graminales	Graminaceae(Poaceae)	-	59. Glyceria R. Br.		
Graminales	Graminaceae(Poaceae)	-	60. Puccinellia Parl		
Graminales	Graminaceae(Poaceae)	-	61. Festuca L.		
Graminales	Graminaceae(Poaceae)	-	62. Vulpia K. C. Gmel.		
Graminales	Graminaceae(Poaceae)	-	63. Bromus L.		
Graminales	Graminaceae(Poaceae)	-	64. Brachypodium P. Beauv. - Obsigă		
Graminales	Graminaceae(Poaceae)	-	65. Cynodon L. C. Rich.		
Graminales	Graminaceae(Poaceae)	-	66. Beckmannia Host		
Graminales	Graminaceae(Poaceae)	-	67. Nardus L.		
Graminales	Graminaceae(Poaceae)	-	68. Lolium L.		
Graminales	Graminaceae(Poaceae)	-	69. Pholiurus Trin.		
Graminales	Graminaceae(Poaceae)	-	70. Psilurus Trin., syn. of Festuca		
Graminales	Graminaceae(Poaceae)	-	71. Agropyron Gaertn.		
Graminales	Graminaceae(Poaceae)	-	73. Triticum L.		
Graminales	Graminaceae(Poaceae)	-	74. Dasypyrum (Coss. et Dur.) Borb. (Haynaldia Schur non Schulze)		
Graminales	Graminaceae(Poaceae)	-	75. Secale L. - Secară		
Graminales	Graminaceae(Poaceae)	-	76. Hordeum L.		
Graminales	Graminaceae(Poaceae)	-	77. Hordelymus (Jessen) Harz (încl. Taeniatherum Nevski)		
Graminales	Graminaceae(Poaceae)	-	78. Elymus L.		
Gynandrales	Orchidaceae	-	1. Cypripedium L.		
Gynandrales	Orchidaceae	-	2. Cephalanthera L. C. Rich.		
Gynandrales	Orchidaceae	-	3. Epipactis Zinn. - Mşăştiniţă		
Gynandrales	Orchidaceae	-	4. Limodorum Rich.		
Gynandrales	Orchidaceae	-	5. Listera R. Br.		
Gynandrales	Orchidaceae	-	6. Neottia Sw.		
Gynandrales	Orchidaceae	-	7. Spiranthes L. C. Rich		
Gynandrales	Orchidaceae	-	8. Goodyera R. Br.		
Gynandrales	Orchidaceae	-	9. Epipogium R. Br.		
Gynandrales	Orchidaceae	-	10. Platanthera L. C. Rich.		
Gynandrales	Orchidaceae	-	11. Coeloglossum Hartm.		
Gynandrales	Orchidaceae	-	12. Gymnadenia R. Br. - Ură		
Gynandrales	Orchidaceae	-	13. Leucorchis E. Mayer		
Gynandrales	Orchidaceae	-	14. Nigritella L. C. Rich. - Sângele Voinicului		
Gynandrales	Orchidaceae	-	15. Chamorchis L. C. Rich.		
Gynandrales	Orchidaceae	-	16. Herminium R. Br.		
Gynandrales	Orchidaceae	-	17. Ophrys L.		
Gynandrales	Orchidaceae	-	18. Anacamptis L. C. Rich		
Gynandrales	Orchidaceae	-	19. Traunsteinera Rchb. f.		
Gynandrales	Orchidaceae	-	20. Orchis L. - Poroinis		
Gynandrales	Orchidaceae	-	21. Dactylorhiza Necker ex Nevski	3	
Gynandrales	Orchidaceae	-	22. Himantoglossum Sperg.	3	
Gynandrales	Orchidaceae	-	23. Malaxis Soland.	3	
Gynandrales	Orchidaceae	-	24. Hammarbya O. Kitze.	3	
Gynandrales	Orchidaceae	-	25. Liparis L. C. Rich.	3	
Gynandrales	Orchidaceae	-	26. Corallorhiza Chatelain	3	
Spathiflorales	Araceae	-	1. Acorus L.		
Spathiflorales	Araceae	-	2. Calla L.		
Spathiflorales	Araceae	-	3. Arum L. - Rodul pământului		
Spathiflorales	Lemnaceae	-	1. Lemna L. - Lintiţă		
Spathiflorales	Lemnaceae	-	2. Spirodela Schleiden		
Spathiflorales	Lemnaceae	-	3. Wolffia Horkel		

== See also ==
- List of plants from the mountains of Romania
- List of Dacian plant names
