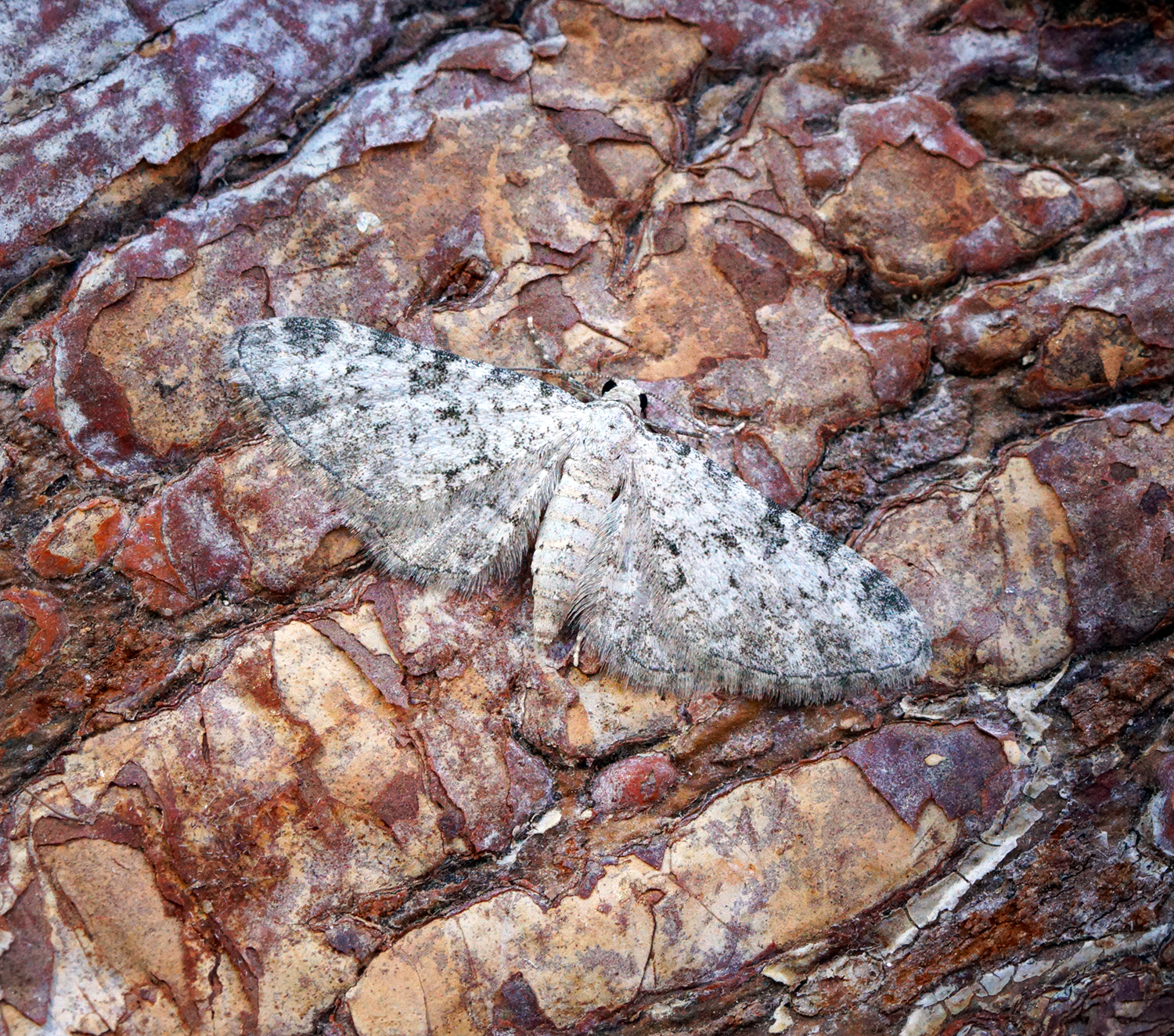

Scientific classification
- Domain: Eukaryota
- Kingdom: Animalia
- Phylum: Arthropoda
- Class: Insecta
- Order: Lepidoptera
- Family: Geometridae
- Genus: Eupithecia
- Species: E. semigraphata

Binomial name
- Eupithecia semigraphata Bruand, 1850

Synonyms
- Tephroclystia nepetata

= Eupithecia semigraphata =

Species of moth

Eupithecia semigraphata is a moth in the family Geometridae. It is found from most of Europe (except the Netherlands, Ireland, Great Britain, Denmark, Fennoscandia, the Baltic region and Portugal) to the Caucasus and Armenia. It is also present on the Canary Islands and North Africa.

The wingspan is about 18–20 mm. Adults are on wing from late June to August in one generation per year.

The larvae feed on the flowers of Calamintha (including Calamintha nepeta and Calamintha sylvatica), Hypericum, Origanum and Thymus species. The species overwinters in the pupal stage.

== Subspecies ==
- Eupithecia semigraphata semigraphata
- Eupithecia semigraphata arida Dietze, 1910
- Eupithecia semigraphata canariensis Dietze, 1910
- Eupithecia semigraphata gravosata Schutze, 1956
- Eupithecia semigraphata lutulentaria Schwingenschuss, 1939
- Eupithecia semigraphata nepetata Mabille, 1869
- Eupithecia semigraphata porphyrata Zerny, 1934
