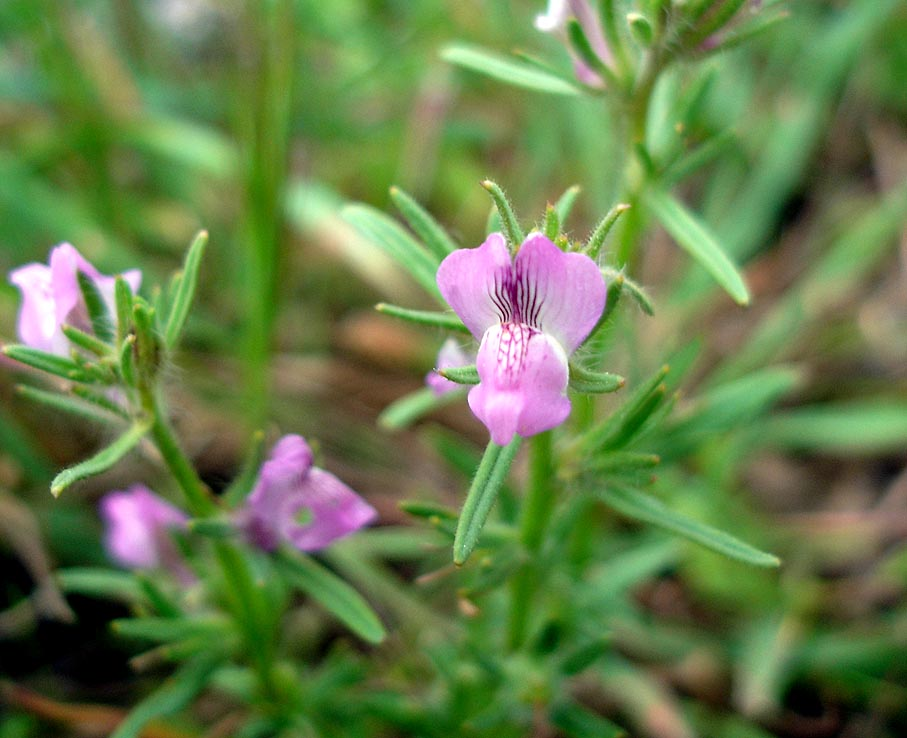

Scientific classification
- Kingdom: Plantae
- Clade: Tracheophytes
- Clade: Angiosperms
- Clade: Eudicots
- Clade: Asterids
- Order: Lamiales
- Family: Plantaginaceae
- Genus: Misopates
- Species: M. orontium

Binomial name
- Misopates orontium (L.) Raf.

Synonyms
- Antirrhinum orontium

= Misopates orontium =

Species of flowering plant

Misopates orontium, known as weasel's snout, is a herbaceous annual plant in the family Plantaginaceae. It is a native of disturbed ground in Europe. It is also naturalised as a weed in other parts of the world such as North America. The pink flowers resemble a miniature snapdragon and are followed by a hairy green fruit which is said to resemble a weasel's snout.

Common names include linearleaf snapdragon, weasel's snout, lesser snapdragon or calf's snout. Past common names have included lesser snapdragon and corn-snapdragon.

== Taxonomy ==
Alternatively considered as the type species of section Orontium, genus Antirrhinum.
