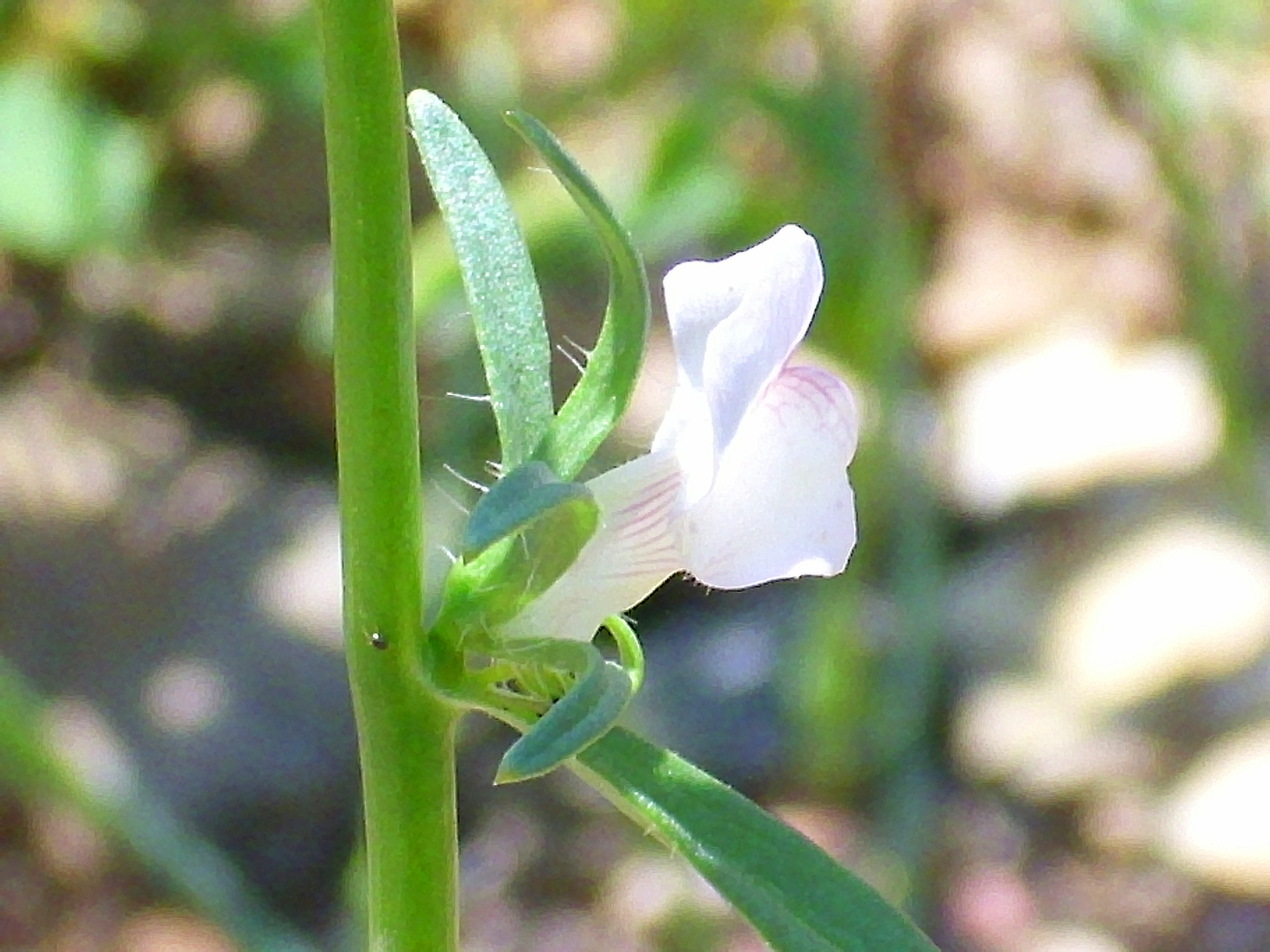

Scientific classification
- Kingdom: Plantae
- Clade: Tracheophytes
- Clade: Angiosperms
- Clade: Eudicots
- Clade: Asterids
- Order: Lamiales
- Family: Plantaginaceae
- Genus: Misopates
- Species: M. calycinum

Binomial name
- Misopates calycinum (Lange) Rothm.

Synonyms
- List: Antirrhinum calycinum Vent.; Antirrhinum jamaicense Fisch. ex Colla; Antirrhinum theodoroi Sennen & Mauricio; Antirrhinum orontium var. grandiflorum (Chav.) Valdés; Orontium calycinum Pers.

= Misopates calycinum =

Species of plant

Misopates calycinum is a species of annual herb in the family Plantaginaceae. They have simple leaves.

== Sources ==
This article incorporates text from a free content work. Licensed under CC0 (license statement/permission). Text taken from Misopates calycinum. Encyclopedia of Life.
