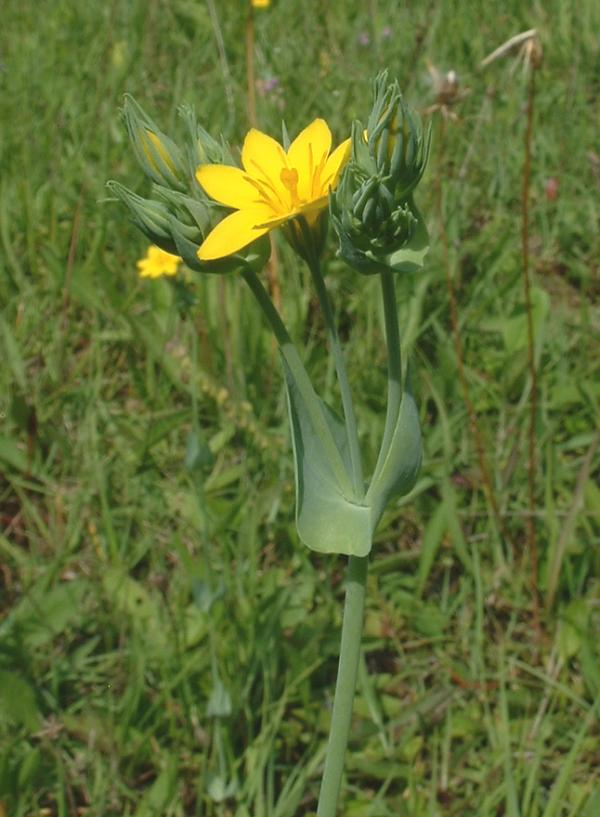

Scientific classification
- Kingdom: Plantae
- Clade: Tracheophytes
- Clade: Angiosperms
- Clade: Eudicots
- Clade: Asterids
- Order: Gentianales
- Family: Gentianaceae
- Genus: Blackstonia
- Species: B. perfoliata

Binomial name
- Blackstonia perfoliata (L.) Huds.

Synonyms
- Chlora perfoliata

= Blackstonia perfoliata =

Species of flowering plant in the gentian family

Blackstonia perfoliata or more commonly known as the yellow-wort is a species of flowering plant in the family Gentianaceae found around the Mediterranean Basin, but extending into northwestern Europe.

== Description ==
Yellow-wort grows 10–50 cm (3.9–19.7 in) tall, with stiff, branching stems. The leaves are glaucous, opposite and entire, the upper ones perfoliate, being united at the base. It bears terminal cymes of bright yellow, stalked flowers, 1–1.5 cm (0.39–0.59 in) across. The calyx is deeply divided into 6–10 linear lobes or sepals, spirally arranged, free or nearly free from each other at the base and shorter than the corolla. The petals number six to ten and form a short tube. There are six to ten adherent stamens and a two-lobed stigma.

== Ecology ==
This species is found in chalk or limestone turf and on dunes. It flowers from June to October in Britain where it is widespread but not common. Pathogens affecting B. perfoliata include Peronospora chlorae.

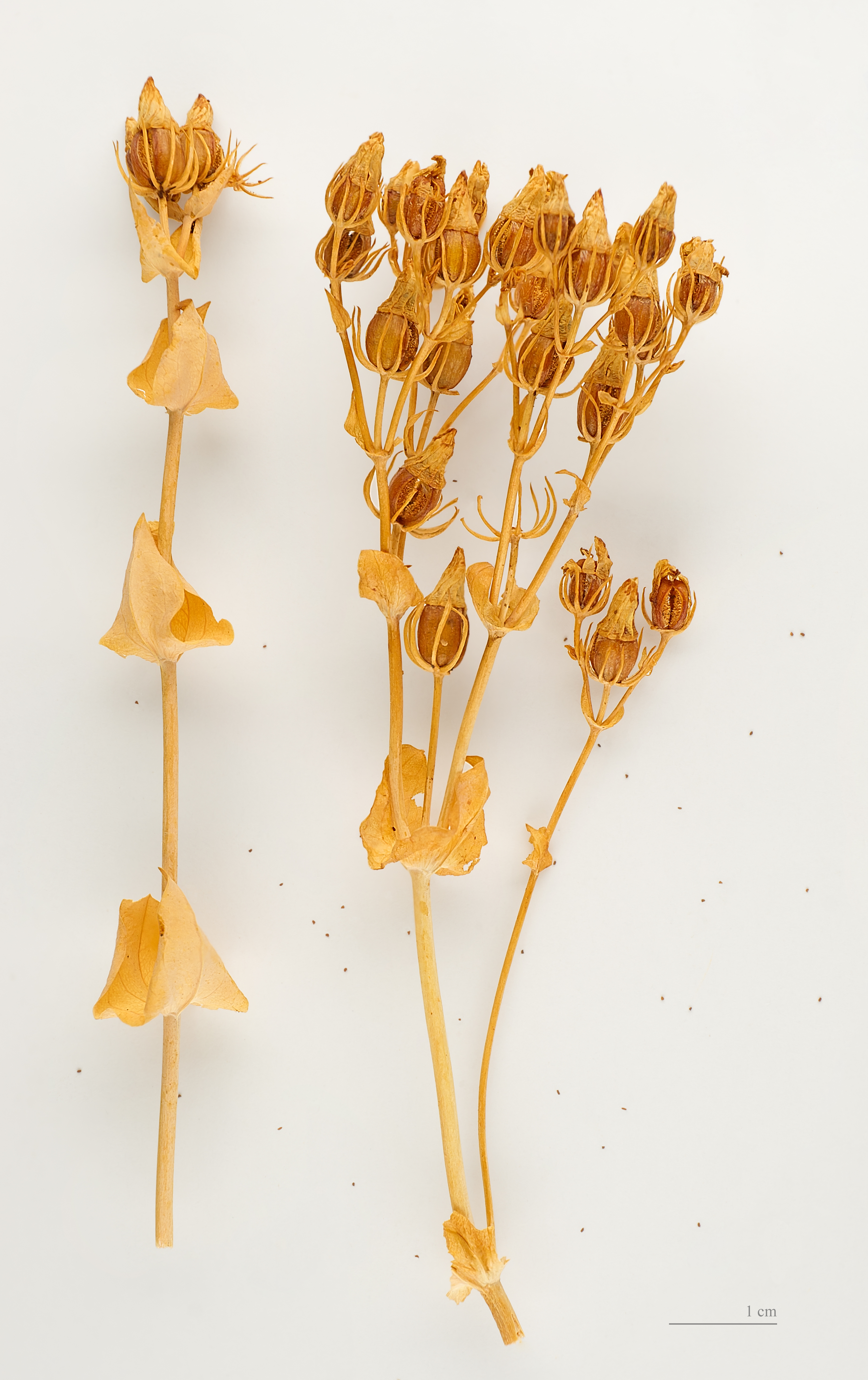
Capsules and seeds – MHNT
