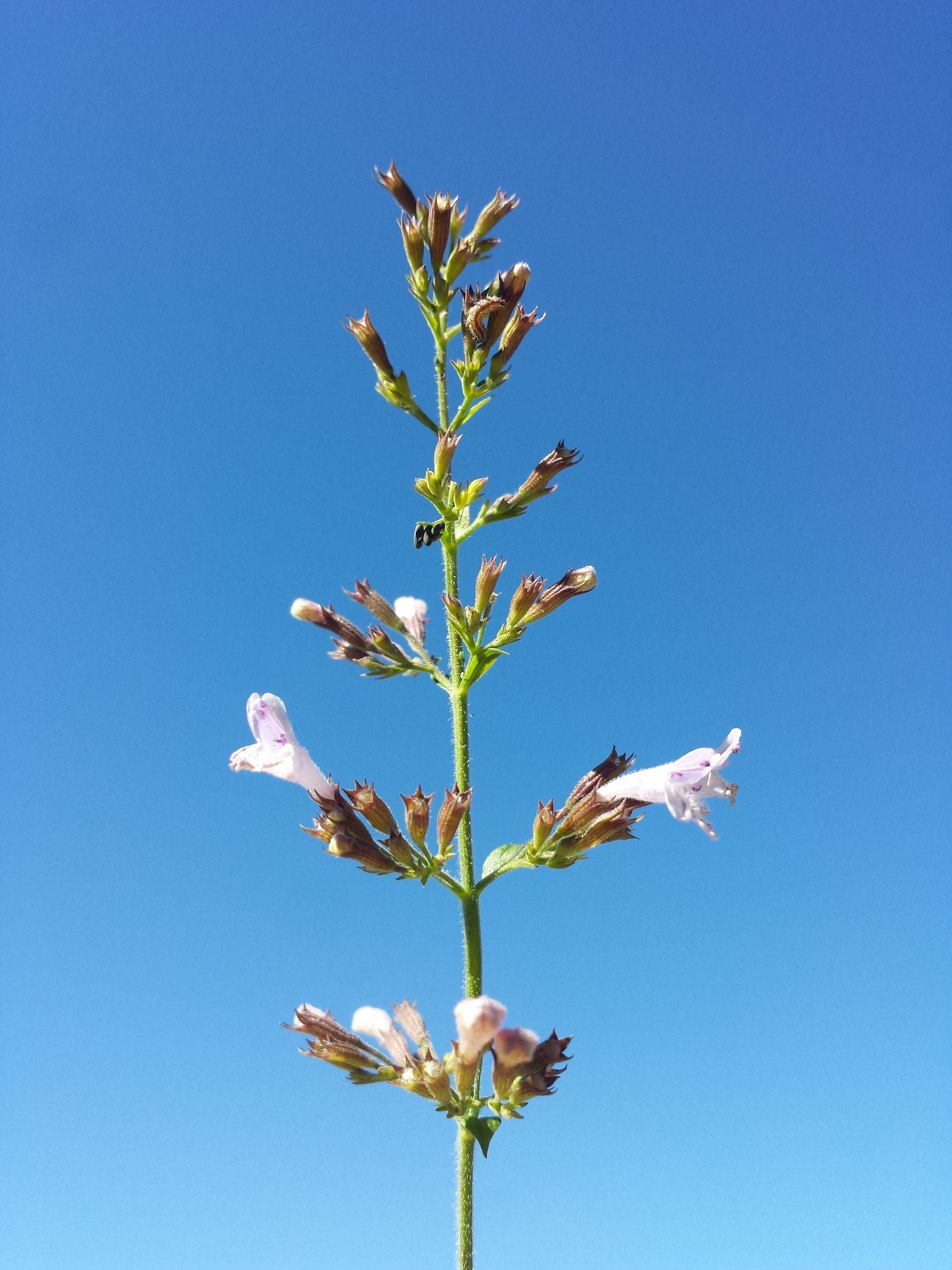

Scientific classification
- Kingdom: Plantae
- Clade: Embryophytes
- Clade: Tracheophytes
- Clade: Spermatophytes
- Clade: Angiosperms
- Clade: Eudicots
- Clade: Asterids
- Order: Lamiales
- Family: Lamiaceae
- Genus: Clinopodium
- Species: C. menthifolium

Binomial name
- Clinopodium menthifolium (Host) Stace

Synonyms
- Calamintha menthaefolia Host; Calamintha menthifolia Host; Calamintha nepeta subsp. sylvatica (Bromf.) R.Morales; Calamintha officinalis f. boveana (K.Malý) Hayek; Clinopodium nepeta subsp. sylvaticum (Bromf.) Peruzzi & F.Conti; Satureja calamintha subsp. menthifolia (Host) Gams; Satureja menthifolia (Host) Fritsch; Satureja sylvatica (Bromf.) K.Malý

= Clinopodium menthifolium =

Species of flowering plant

Clinopodium menthifolium, commonly known as the wood calamint or woodland calamint, is a species of flowering plant in the mint family, Lamiaceae. It is found throughout southern and central Europe from the United Kingdom and east as far as temperate parts of Asia, and as south as North Africa. It grows up to 1,700 m (5,600 ft) in elevation.

The three subspecies of C. menthifolium have been previously considered separate species, including C. m. subsp. ascendens (syn. C. ascendens), the common calamint or ascending wild basil, and C. m. subsp. hirtum (C. hirtum).

== Taxonomy ==
The wood calamint was first formally named in 1831 by Nicolaus Thomas Host as Calamintha menthifolia.

Over its taxonomic history the species has been placed in several genera. In addition to Calamintha, in which it was originally described, it has been treated under Satureja before being placed in the genus Clinopodium, the treatment followed by Plants of the World Online. These changes in classification are reflected in the plant's numerous synonyms.

Three subspecies are accepted:

- Clinopodium menthifolium subsp. menthifolium (Host) Stace – commonly called Calamintha sylvatica
- Clinopodium menthifolium subsp. ascendens (Jord.) Govaerts – commonly called Calamintha ascendens
- Clinopodium menthifolium subsp. hirtum (Briq.) Govaerts – commonly called Calamintha hirta

== Description ==
Clinopodium menthifolium subsp. menthifolium is a tufted, hairy, mint-scented perennial herb with an upright habit and few branches. It grows to a height of around 60 cm (2 ft). The leaves are dark green, stalked and grow in opposite pairs. The leaf blades are ovate with rounded teeth and are larger than those C. menthifolium subsp. ascendens. The lipped flowers are also larger and darker, with the corolla lobe at least twice as long as the hairy calyx.

Clinopodium menthifolium subsp. ascendens grows to about 30–60 millimetres (1.2–2.4 in) in height. This perennial rhizomatous herbaceous hemicryptophyte plant has stalked leaves and an erect hairy stem with tall flowering spikes. It produces pinkish or bluish flowers with spots on the white lower lip. They bloom from July to September.

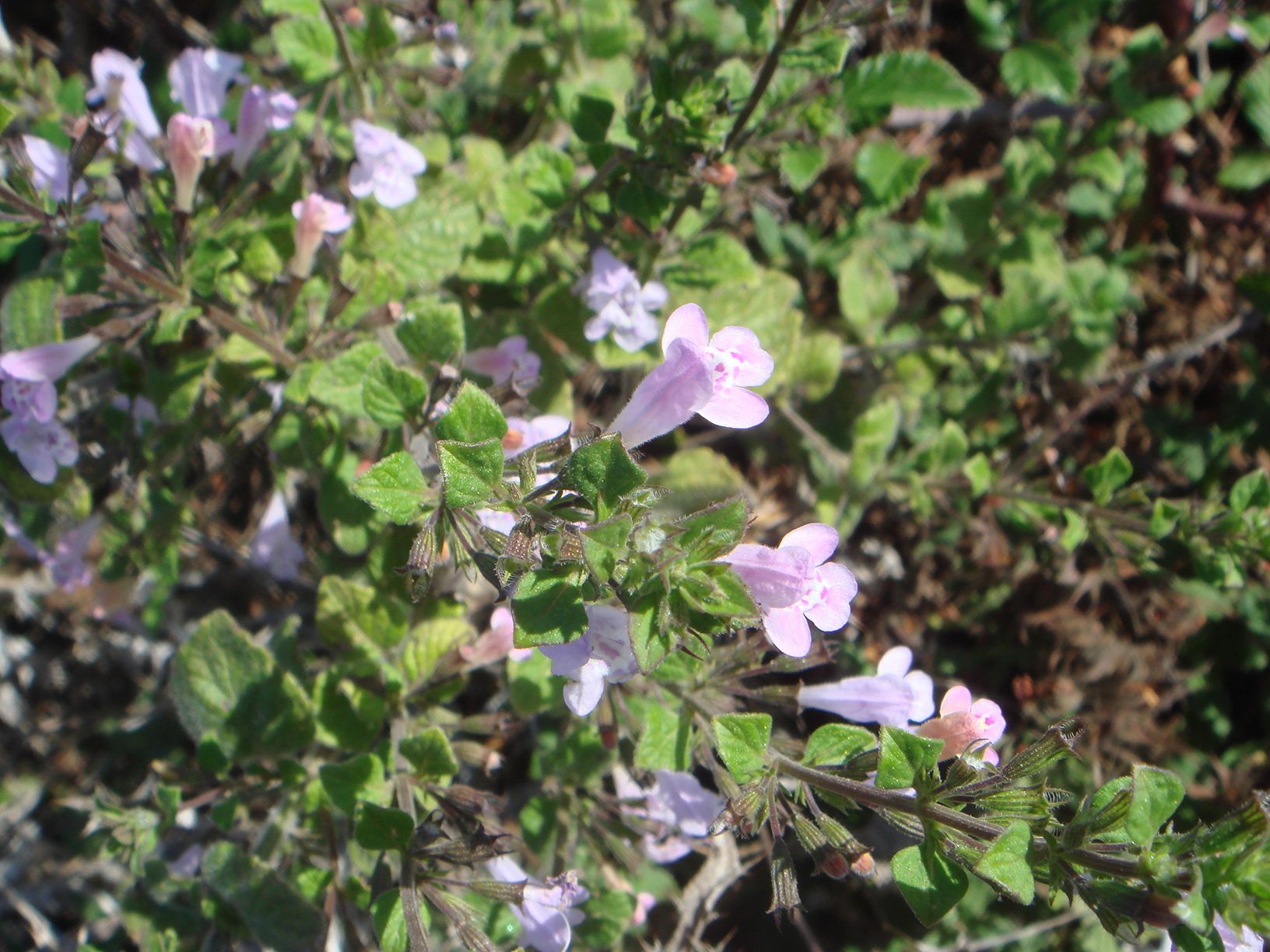
Clinopodium menthifolium subsp. menthifolium

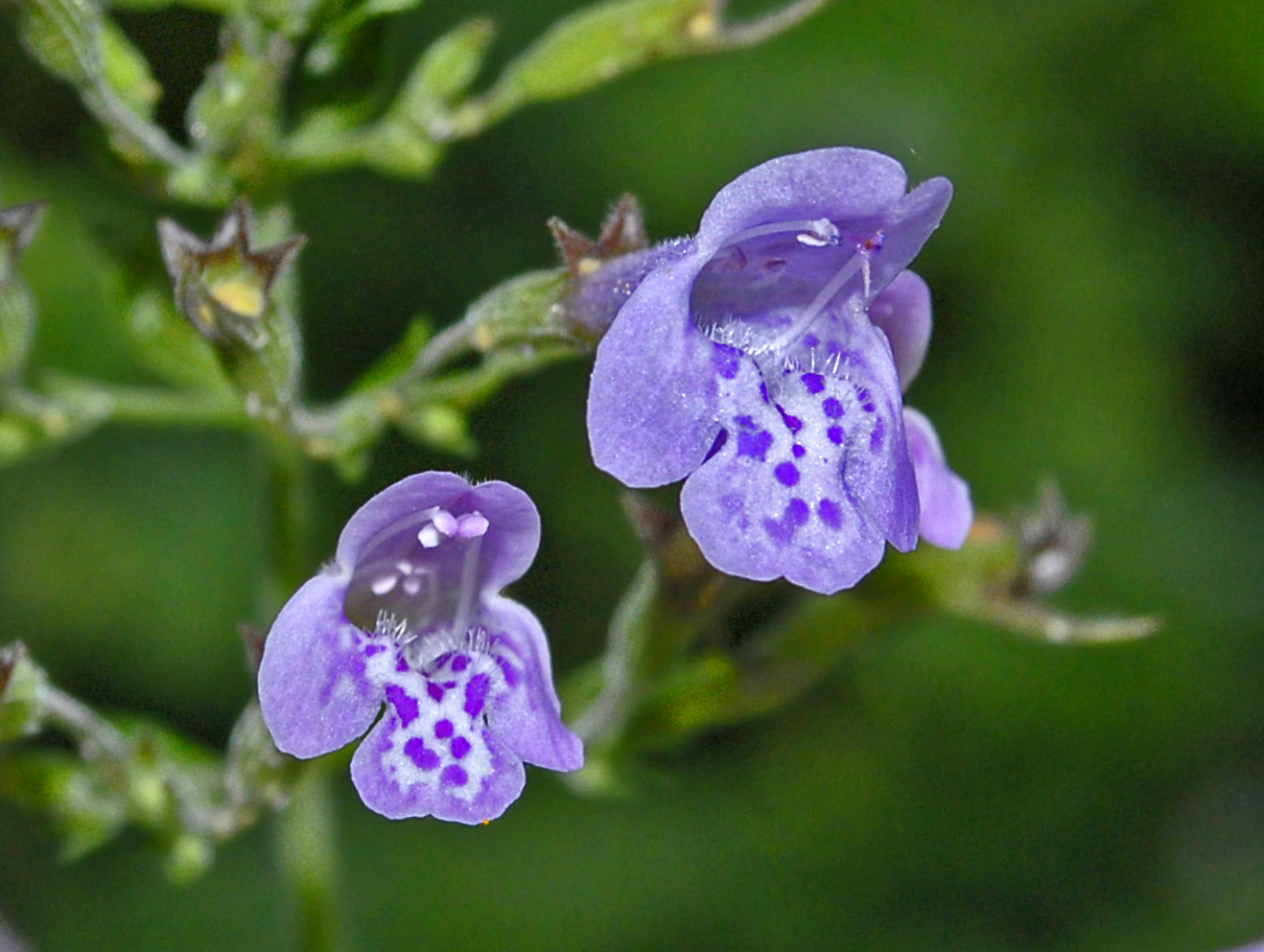
Clinopodium menthifolium subsp. ascendens

== Distribution and habitat ==
Wood calamint is native to Western Europe and North Africa. Its range extends from France and Germany south to Spain and Algeria, and it also known from Northern Syria. In Britain, it is limited to a single site in the Isle of Wight, where it grows in ancient deciduous woodland on a chalk soil. It has been introduced into the United States where it has become naturalised in California and Virginia.

Clinopodium menthifolium subsp. ascendens occurs on dry, calcareous soils in hedges, roadsides, grasslands and rocky grounds.

== Uses ==
The leaves of wood calamint can be infused to make an aromatic herb tea. They can also be added to cooked foods, imparting a pungent, aromatic flavour that has been described as being a combination of the flavours imparted by marjoram and mint. The plant is also used as an ornamental for garden cultivation, and will attract butterflies and bees.

The plant has also been used medicinally, as a diaphoretic and an expectorant, and to settle the stomach. It can be added to cough medicine, often in combination with yarrow (Achillea millefolium) and thyme (Thymus vulgaris). It is also used to treat fever, insomnia and depression.
