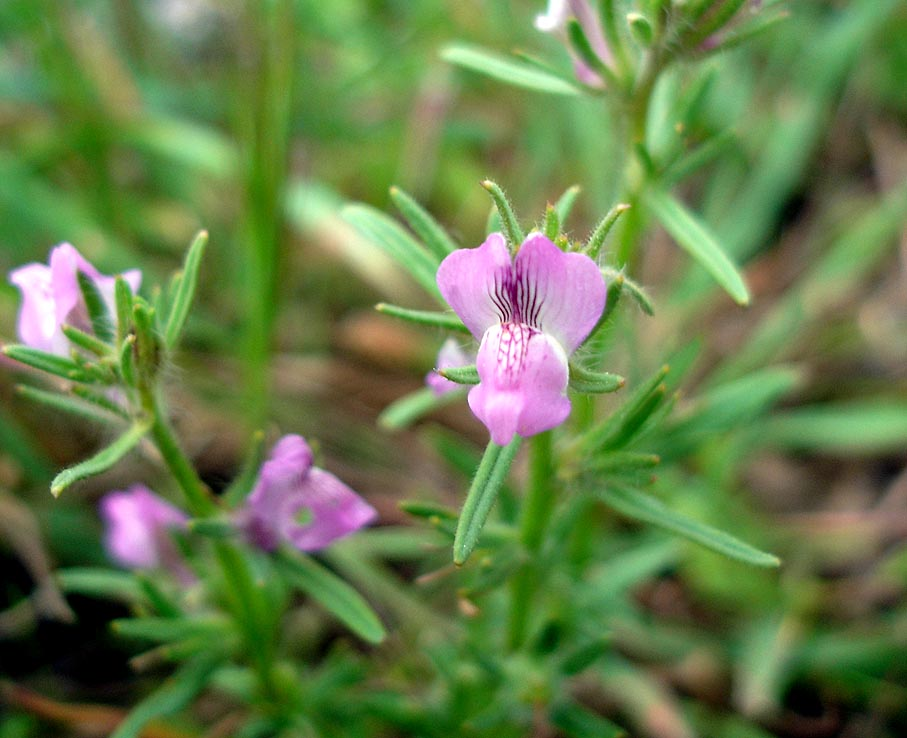
- Misopates orontium

Scientific classification
- Kingdom: Plantae
- Clade: Tracheophytes
- Clade: Angiosperms
- Clade: Eudicots
- Clade: Asterids
- Order: Lamiales
- Family: Plantaginaceae
- Tribe: Antirrhineae
- Genus: Misopates; Raf.

Type species
- Misopates orontium (L.) Raf.

Synonyms
- Agorrhinum Fourr.

= Misopates =

Genus of flowering plants

Misopates is a genus of the family Plantaginaceae, and is one of the groups of plants commonly known as 'snapdragons'. It has eight accepted species:

- Misopates calycinum (Lange) Rothm.
- Misopates chrysothales (Font Quer) Rothm.
- Misopates font-queri (Emb.) Ibn Tattou
- Misopates marraicum D.A.Sutton
- Misopates microcarpum (Pomel) D.A.Sutton
- Misopates oranense (Faure) D.A.Sutton
- Misopates orontium (L.) Raf.
- Misopates salvagense D.A.Sutton
