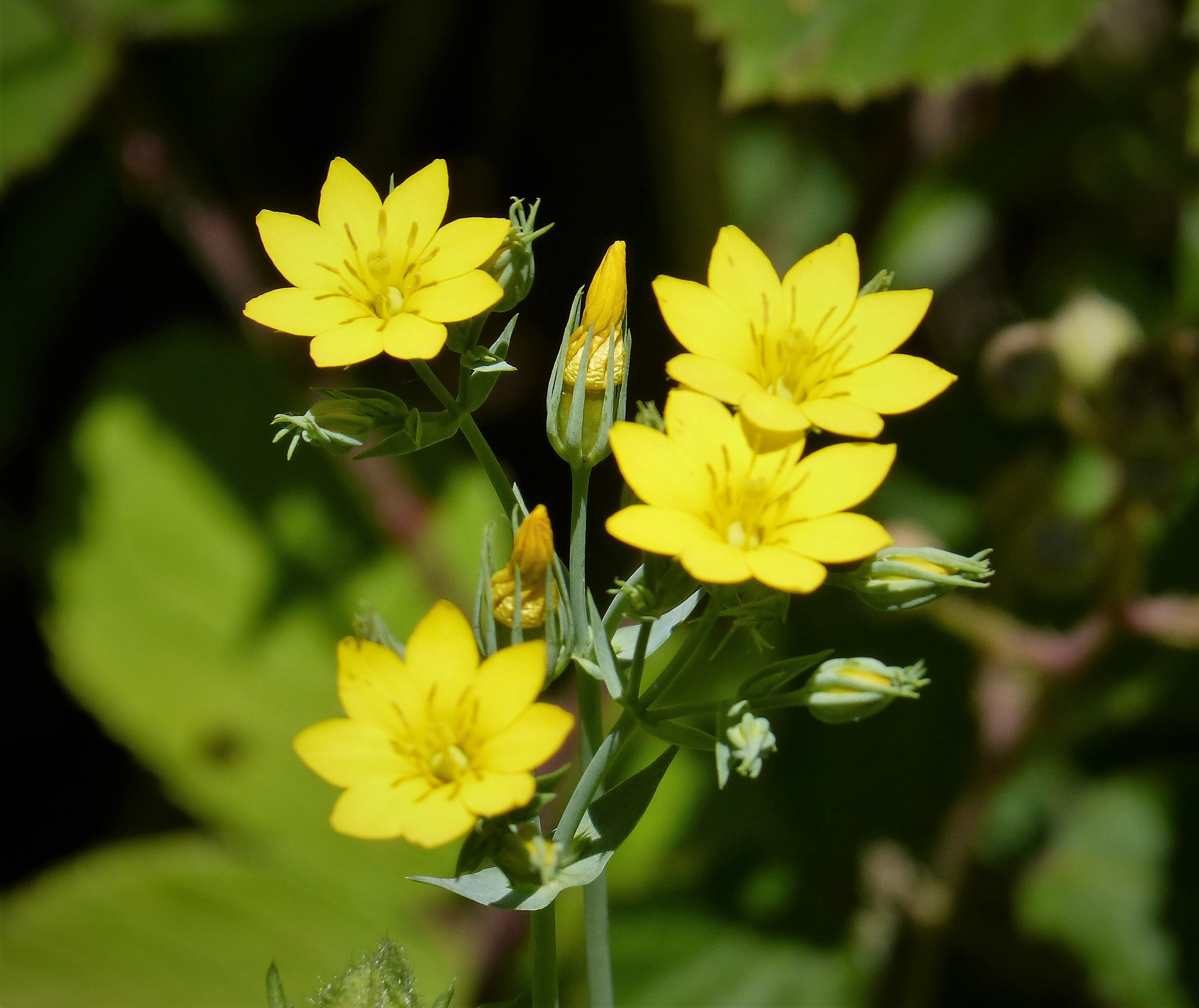
- Blackstonia perfoliata, yellow-wort

Scientific classification
- Kingdom: Plantae
- Clade: Embryophytes
- Clade: Tracheophytes
- Clade: Angiosperms
- Clade: Eudicots
- Clade: Asterids
- Order: Gentianales
- Family: Gentianaceae
- Subtribe: Chironiinae
- Genus: Blackstonia; Huds.

Species
- See text

= Blackstonia =

Genus of flowering plants in the gentian family

Blackstonia is a genus of flowering plants of the family Gentianaceae, native to Europe and to nearby regions of Asia and Africa. Its best known species is its type species, Blackstonia perfoliata, the yellow-wort.

The genus is named after the English botanical writer John Blackstone (1712–1753).

== Species ==
Species currently accepted by The Plant List are as follows:

- Blackstonia acuminata (Koch & Ziz) Domin
- Blackstonia grandiflora (Viv.) Maire
- Blackstonia imperfoliata (L.f.) Samp.
- Blackstonia perfoliata (L.) Huds.
