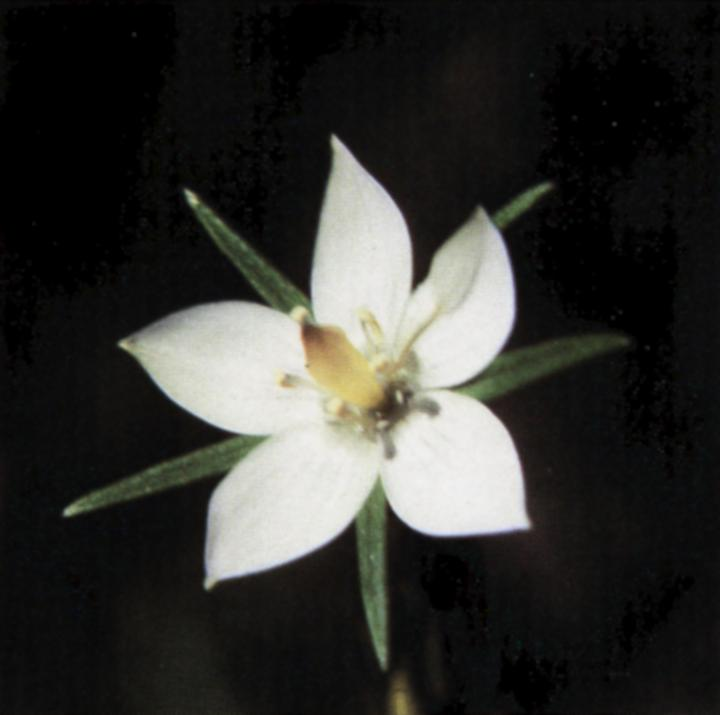
- Lomatogonium rotatum

Scientific classification
- Kingdom: Plantae
- Clade: Embryophytes
- Clade: Tracheophytes
- Clade: Angiosperms
- Clade: Eudicots
- Clade: Asterids
- Order: Gentianales
- Family: Gentianaceae
- Tribe: Gentianeae
- Subtribe: Swertiinae
- Genus: Lomatogonium; A.Braun

Species
- See text

= Lomatogonium =

Genus of flowering plants

Lomatogonium is a genus of 18 species in the family Gentianaceae, found in cool temperate to subarctic regions of Asia, with two species (L. carinthiacum, L. rotatum) also in Europe and one species (L. rotatum) also in North America. By far the highest diversity is in China, with 16 species.

They are annual or perennial plants, growing to 5–15 cm tall, with a basal rosette of 2–3 cm long leaves, and sometimes secondary whorls of smaller leaves on the flower stems. The flowers are 2 cm across, with the five white to pale blue petals joined at the base.

Species

- Lomatogonium bellum
- Lomatogonium brachyantherum
- Lomatogonium carinthiacum
- Lomatogonium chilaiensis
- Lomatogonium chumbicum
- Lomatogonium cuneifolium
- Lomatogonium forrestii
- Lomatogonium gamosepalum
- Lomatogonium lijiangense
- Lomatogonium longifolium
- Lomatogonium macranthum
- Lomatogonium micranthum
- Lomatogonium oreocharis
- Lomatogonium perenne
- Lomatogonium rotatum
- Lomatogonium sichuanense
- Lomatogonium sikkimense
- Lomatogonium stapfii
- Lomatogonium zhongdianense
