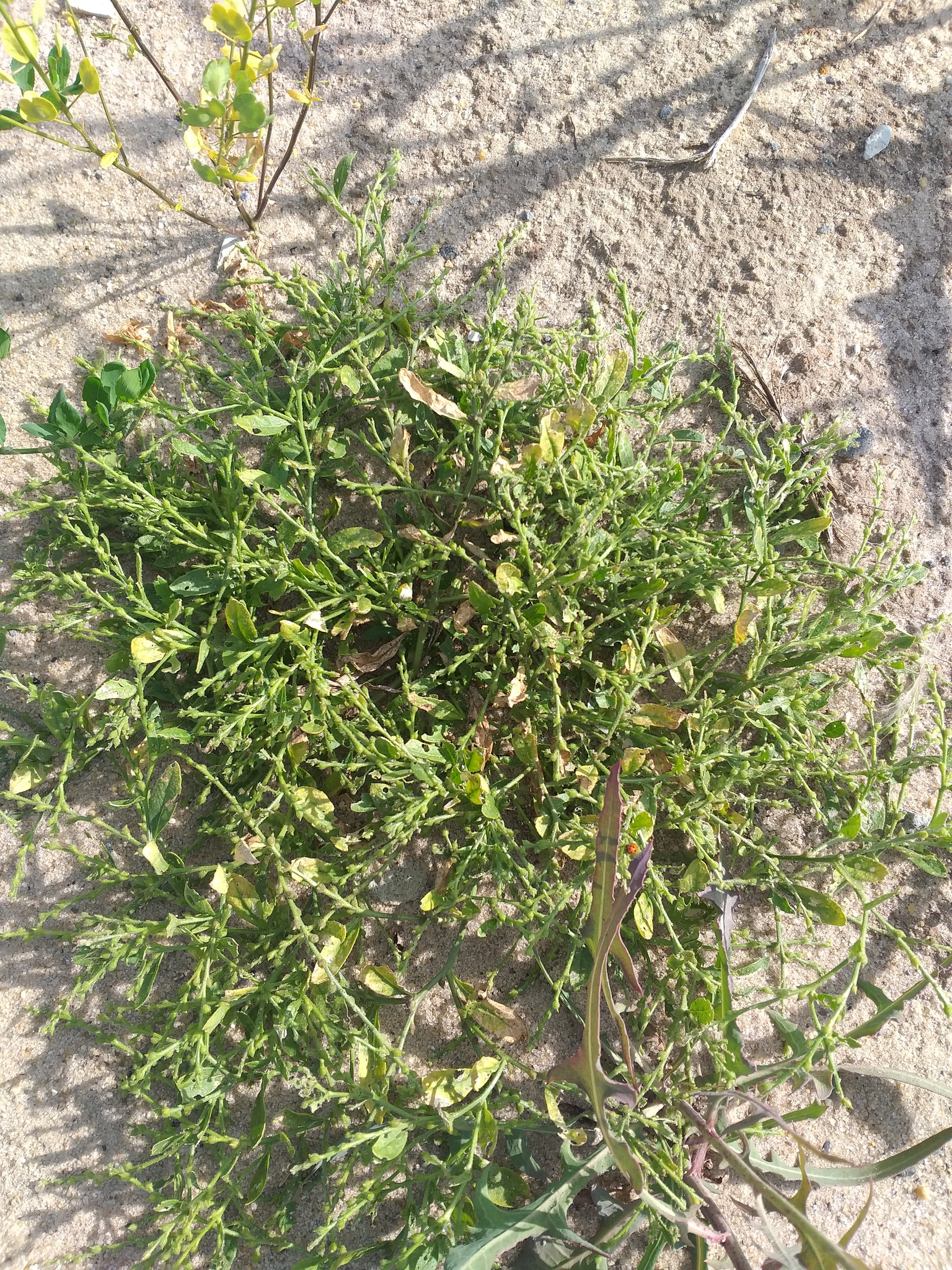
- Euclidium syriacum

Scientific classification
- Kingdom: Plantae
- Clade: Tracheophytes
- Clade: Angiosperms
- Clade: Eudicots
- Clade: Rosids
- Order: Brassicales
- Family: Brassicaceae
- Genus: Euclidium; W.T.Aiton
- Species: E. syriacum

Binomial name
- Euclidium syriacum (L.) W.T.Aiton

Synonyms
- Hierochontis Medik.; Ornithorynchium Röhl.; Soria Adans.; Anastatica syriaca L. (1763) (basionym); Bunias syriaca (L.) Gaertn.; Myagrum syriacum (L.) Crantz; Ornithorynchium syriacum (L.) Röhl.; Anastatica hierachuntica Crantz; Bunias rostrata L'Hér. ex DC.; Crucifera euclidium E.H.L.Krause; Hierochontis carniolica Medik.; Myagrum rigidum Pall.; Myagrum rostratum Scop.; Soria syriaca Kuntze

= Euclidium =

Genus of flowering plants

Euclidium is a genus of flowering plants in the family Brassicaceae. It includes a single species, Euclidium syriacum, a white-flowered annual herb native to Eurasia. It ranges from southeastern Europe to Ukraine and European Russia, the Caucasus, western and Central Asia, the western Himalayas, Xinjiang, and Mongolia.
