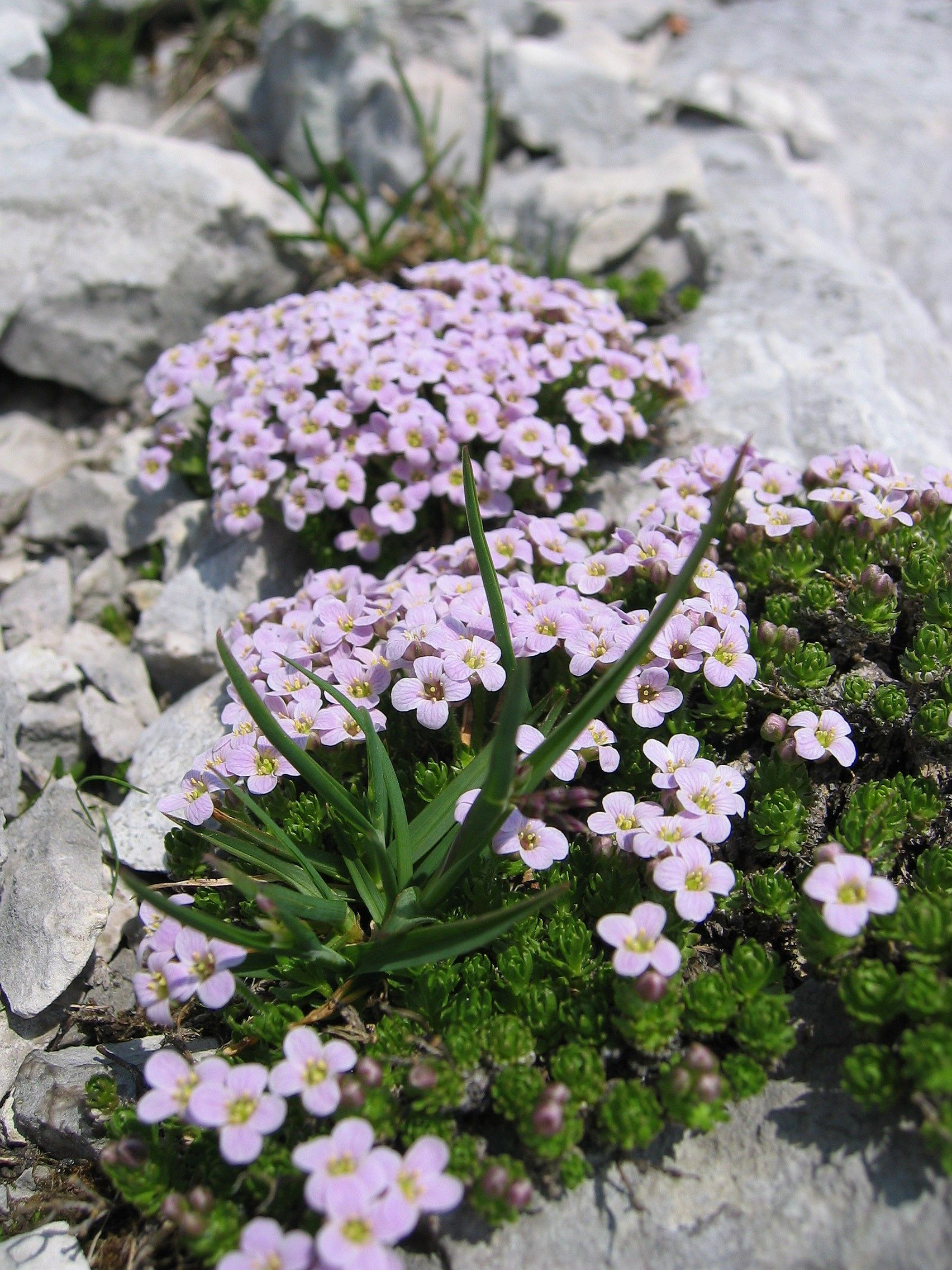
- Petrocallis pyrenaica

Scientific classification
- Kingdom: Plantae
- Clade: Tracheophytes
- Clade: Angiosperms
- Clade: Eudicots
- Clade: Rosids
- Order: Brassicales
- Family: Brassicaceae
- Genus: Petrocallis; W.T.Aiton
- Species: P. pyrenaica

Binomial name
- Petrocallis pyrenaica (L.) W.T.Aiton

Synonyms
- Crucifera petrocallis E.H.L.Krause; Draba pyrenaica L. (1753) (basionym); Draba rubra Crantz; Petrocallis pyrenaica var. pubescens Vacc.; Zizzia pyrenaica (L.) Roth

= Petrocallis =

Genus of plants

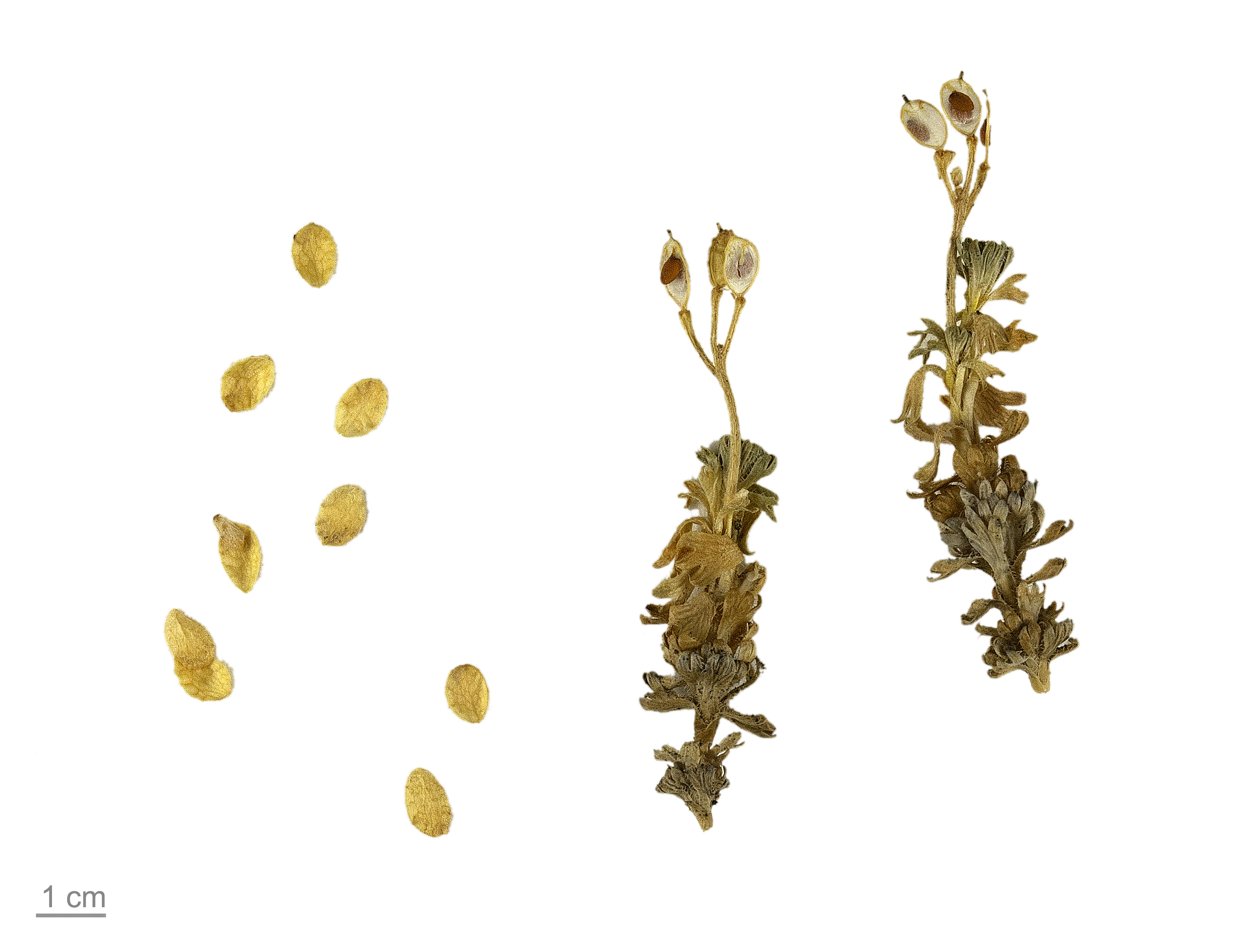
Petrocallis pyrenaica MHNT

Petrocallis is a genus of flowering plants belonging to the family Brassicaceae. It includes a single species, Petrocallis pyrenaica, a subshrub native to subalpine regions in the Pyrenees, Alps, and Carpathian mountains of southern and east-central Europe.
