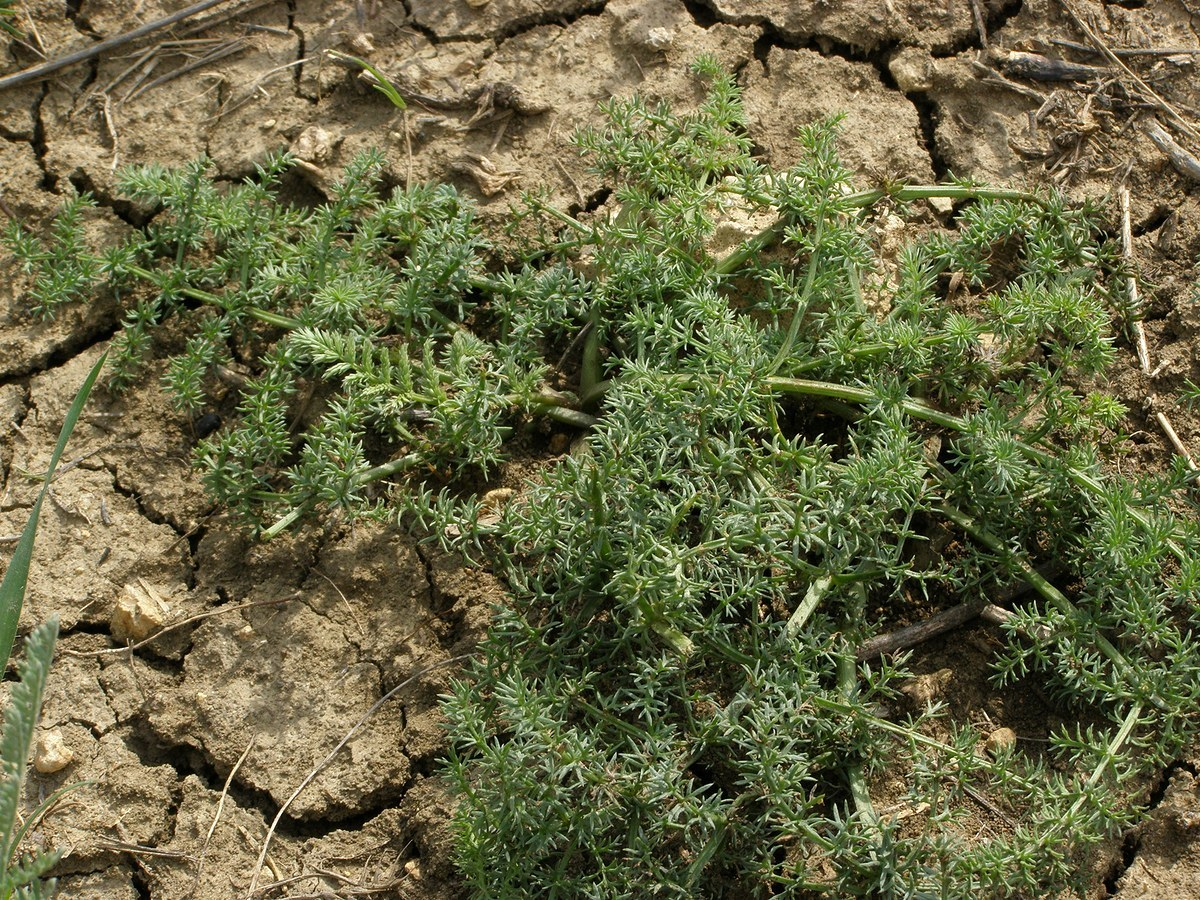
- Palimbia rediviva

Scientific classification
- Kingdom: Plantae
- Clade: Tracheophytes
- Clade: Angiosperms
- Clade: Eudicots
- Clade: Asterids
- Order: Apiales
- Family: Apiaceae
- Genus: Palimbia; Besser ex DC.

= Palimbia =

Genus of plants

Palimbia is a genus of flowering plants belonging to the family Apiaceae.

Its native range is Romania to Western Siberia and Xinjiang.

== Species ==
Species:

- Palimbia defoliata (Ledeb.) Korovin
- Palimbia rediviva (Pall.) Thell.
- Palimbia turgaica Lipsky
