= Todaro =

Todaro is a surname. Notable people with the surname include:

- Agostino Todaro (1818–1892), Italian botanist
- Angelo Todaro (1945–2025), Italian cartoonist
- Francesco Todaro (1839–1918), Italian anatomist
- Frank Todaro (1889–1944), American mobster
- Joseph Todaro Jr. (born 1945/46), American mobster
- Joseph Todaro Sr. (1923–2012), American mobster
- Julie Todaro, American librarian
- Michael Todaro (born 1942), American economist
- Rosalba Todaro, Chilean economist
- Salvatore Todaro (disambiguation), multiple people
