= Nicolaus Thomas Host =

Nicolaus Thomas Host (December 7, 1758 in Fiume, now Rijeka – January 13, 1834 in Vienna) was a Croatian botanist and the personal physician of Holy Roman Emperor Francis II.

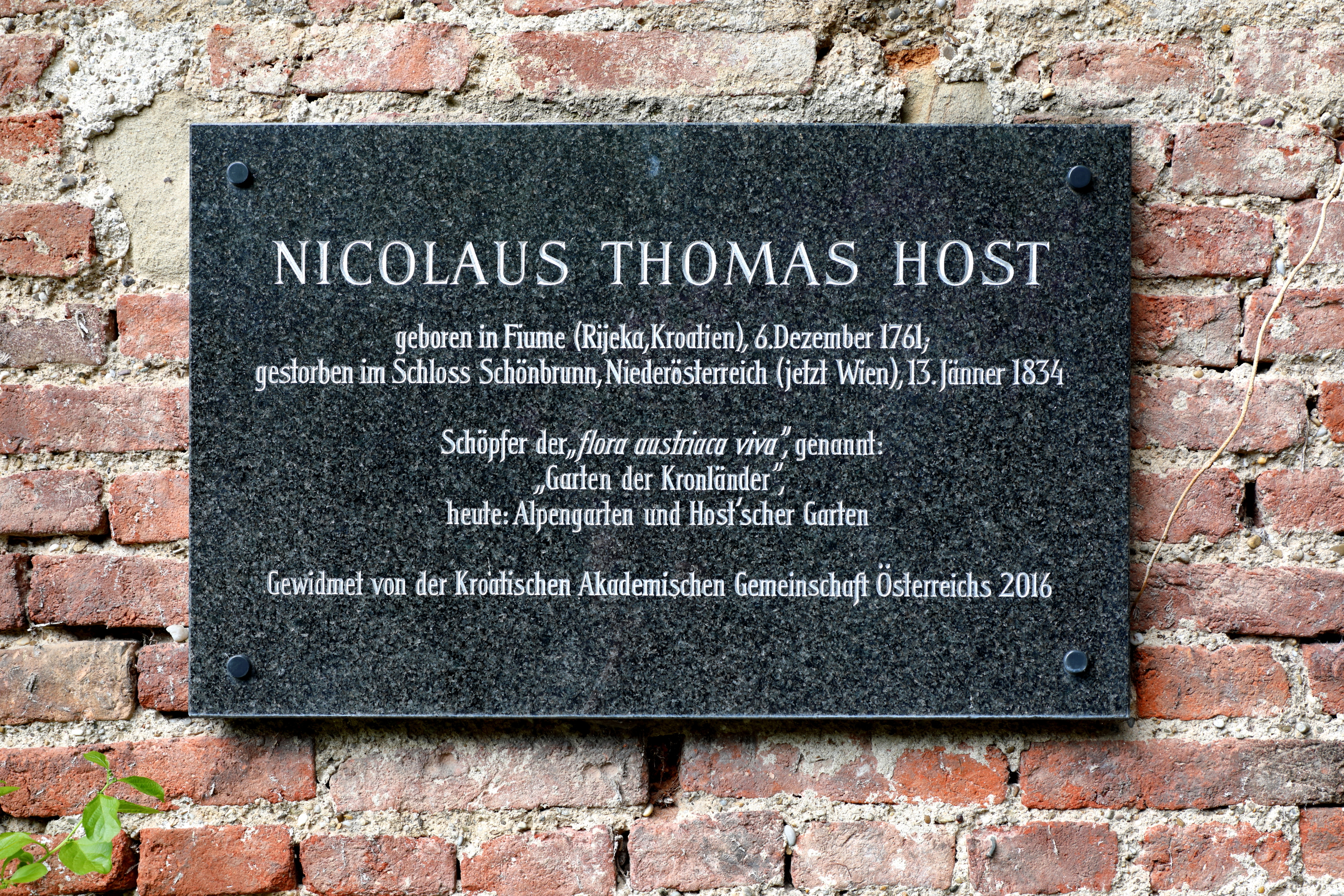
Plaque for Host in the Belvedere Garden (Alpine Garden) in Vienna (with wrong date of birth and wrong place of death)

His botanical works include Synopsis plantarum in Austria and the four-volume Austriacorum Icones et descriptions graminum; he was also the first director of the botanical garden at the Belvedere palace.

The genus Hosta is named for him.
