= Circumboreal Region =

Floristic region in Eurasia and North America

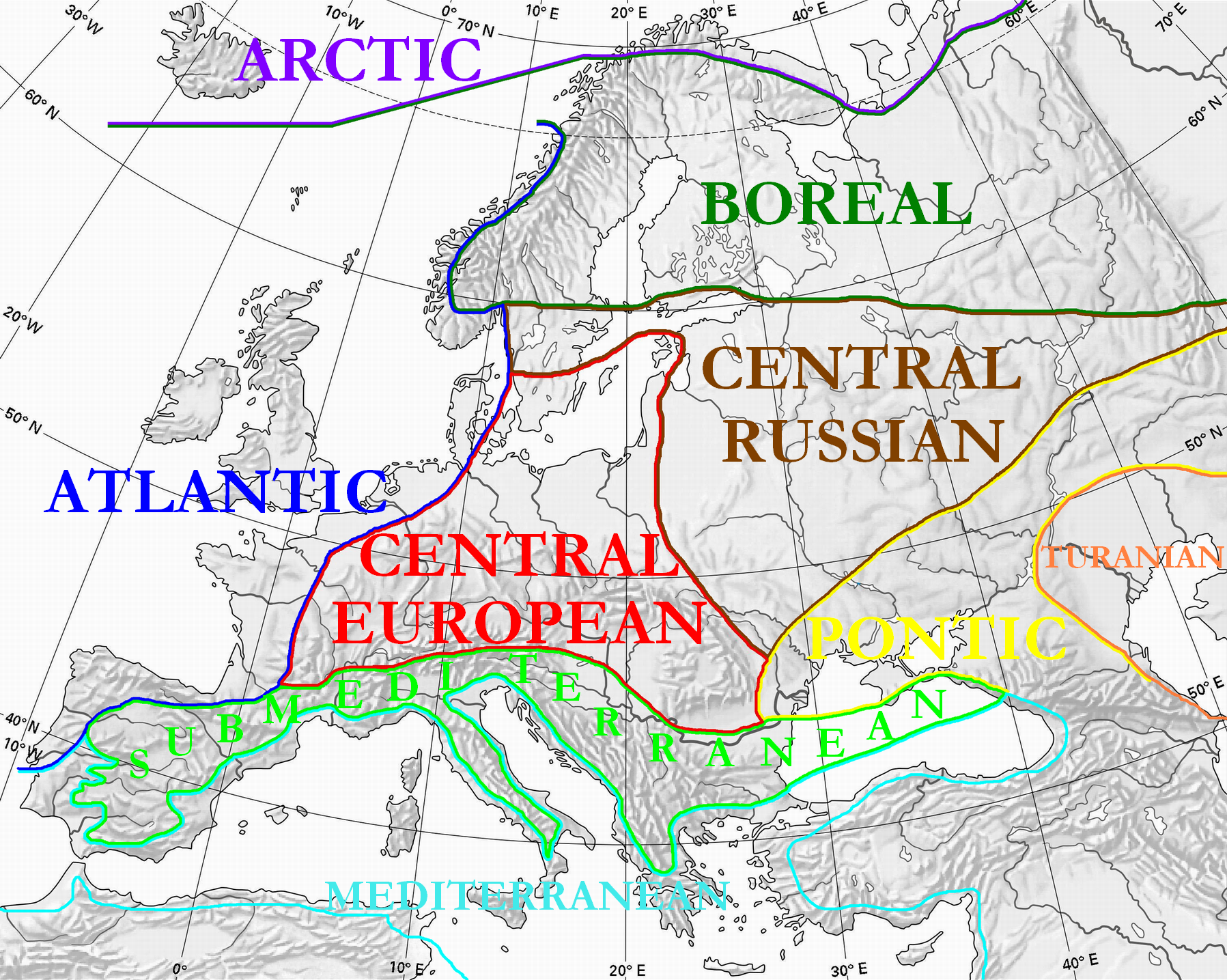
Floristic regions in Europe according to Wolfgang Frey and Rainer Lösch

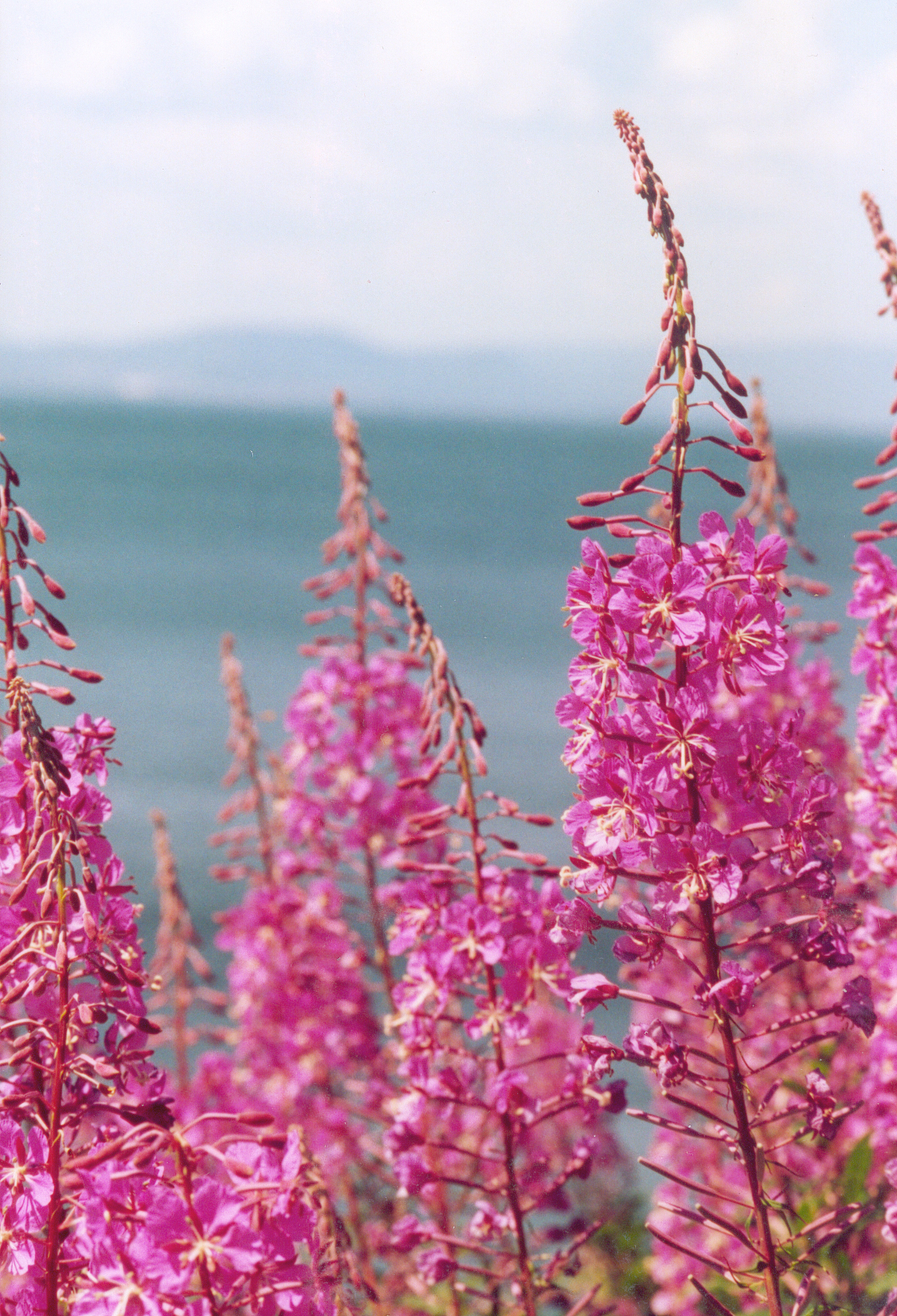
Epilobium angustifolium

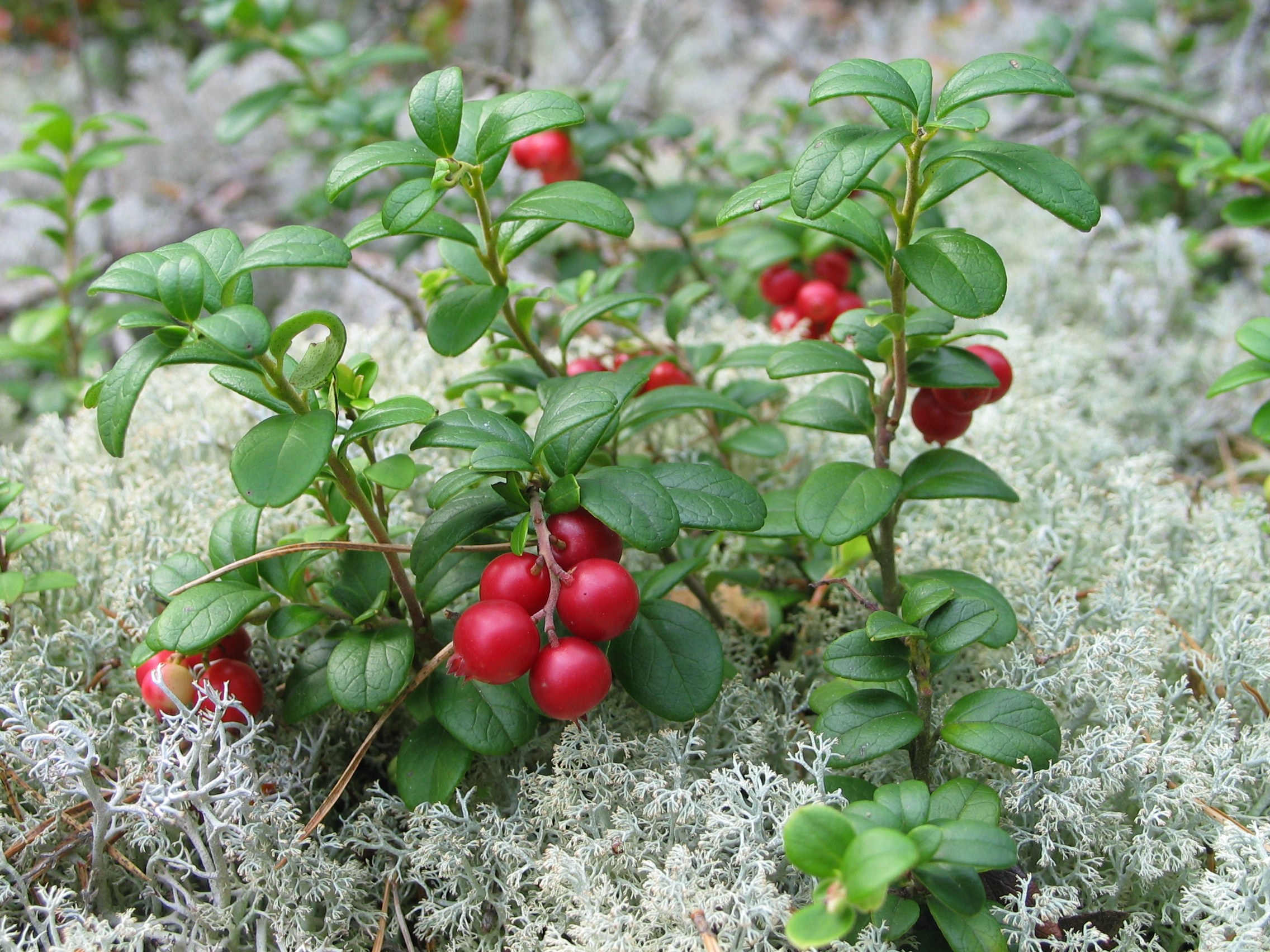
Vaccinium vitis-idaea

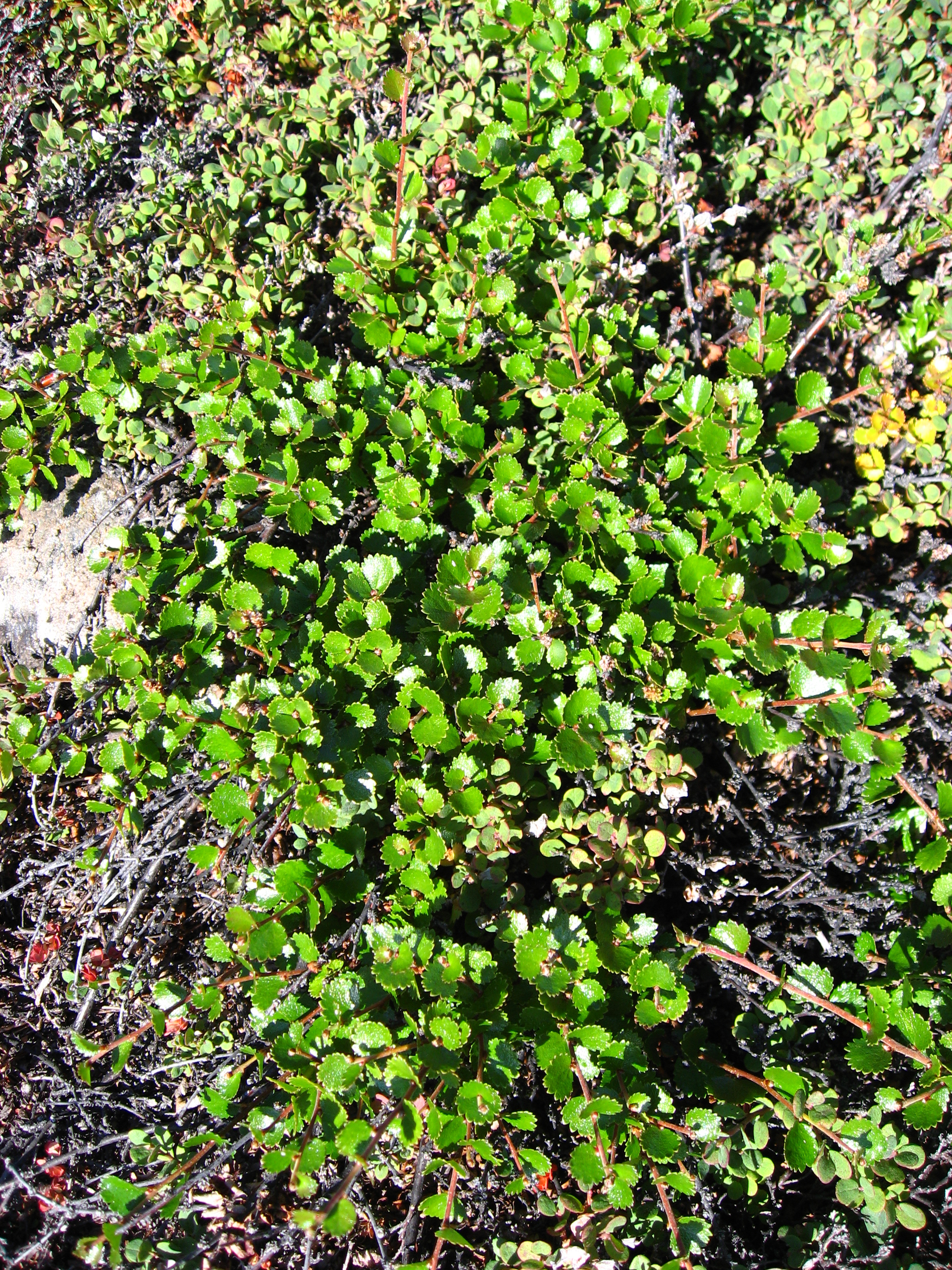
Betula nana in Greenland

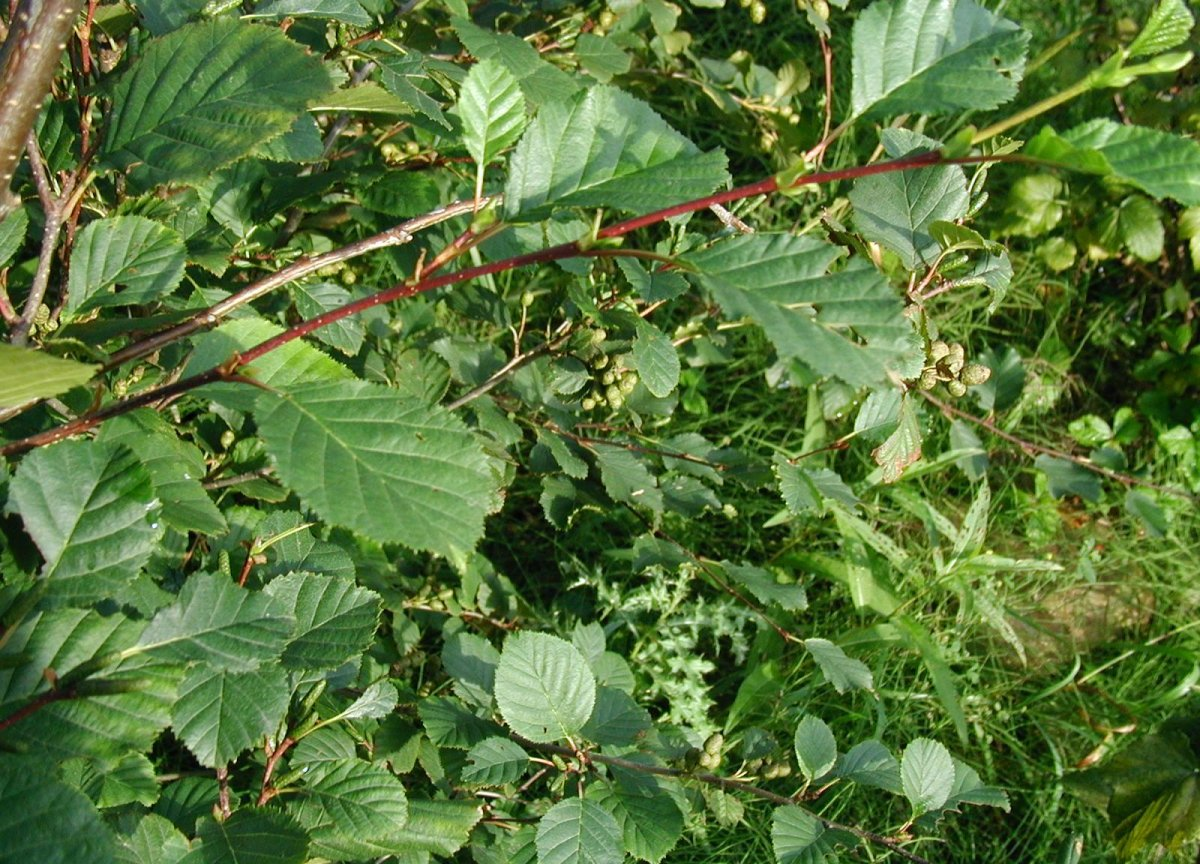
Alnus viridis

The Circumboreal Region in phytogeography is a floristic region within the Holarctic Kingdom in Eurasia and North America, as delineated by such geobotanists as Josias Braun-Blanquet and Armen Takhtajan.

It is the largest floristic region in the world by area, comprising most of Canada, Alaska, Europe, Caucasus and Russia, as well as North Anatolia (as the southernmost part of the region) and parts of northern New England, Michigan, Minnesota, Wisconsin, and the Turtle Mountains of North Dakota. Northern portions of the region include polar desert, taiga and tundra biomes. Many geobotanists divide Eurasian and North American areas into two distinct regions. The continents, however, share much of their boreal flora (e.g. Betula nana, Alnus viridis, Vaccinium vitis-idaea, Arctostaphylos uva-ursi). The flora was severely impoverished during glaciations in the Pleistocene. The region is bordered by Eastern Asiatic, North American Atlantic, Rocky Mountain, Mediterranean and Irano-Turanian Regions.

There are no biological families endemic to this region, but it has endemic genera (e.g. Lunaria, Borodinia, Gorodkovia, Redowskia, Soldanella, Physospermum, Astrantia, Thorella, Pulmonaria, Erinus, Ramonda, Haberlea, Stratiotes, Telekia) and many endemic species, especially in the mountains.

== Floristic provinces ==
It is subdivided into a number of floristic provinces. Their delineation is debatable. According to a version of Takhtajan's classification, these are the Arctic, Atlantic European, Central European, Illyrian, Euxinian, Caucasian, Eastern European, Northern European, West Siberian, Altai-Sayan, Central Siberian, Transbaikalian, Northeastern Siberian, Okhotsk-Kamtchatkan and Canadian Provinces.

- Arctic Province (Greenland, Iceland, northern treeless parts of Norway, Finland, Russia, Alaska and Canada, all the Arctic Islands), with more than a hundred endemic species (e.g. Ranunculus sabinei, Papaver polare, Salix arctica, Colpodium vahlianum, Сolpodium wrightii, Puccinellia angustata)

- Atlantic European Province (Ireland, United Kingdom, Andorra, parts of Portugal, Spain, France, Belgium, Netherlands, Germany, Denmark and Norway), with two endemic genera (Petrocoptis and Thorella), few dozens of endemic species (e.g. Corydalis claviculata, Ulex europaeus, Genista anglica, Deschampsia setacea)
- Central European Province (Austria, Switzerland, Luxembourg, Poland, Czech Republic, Slovakia, Hungary, parts of Croatia, Slovenia, Italy, France, Belgium, Netherlands, Germany, Denmark, Norway, Sweden, Finland, Russia, Estonia, Latvia, Lithuania, Belarus, Ukraine, Moldova, Romania), with several endemic genera (e.g. Rhizobotrya, Hladnikia, Berardia) and 10-15% endemic species (e.g. Aconitum paniculatum, Dianthus alpinus, Rhododendron hirsutum, Soldanella carpatica, Rosa abietina, Saxifraga muscoides, Trifolium saxatile, Chaerophyllum villarsii, Heracleum carpaticum, Syringa josikaea, Valeriana tripteris, Campanula zoysii, Campanula carpatica, Pulmonaria filarzkyana, Leontopodium alpinum, Narcissus poeticus, Narcissus angustifolius, Gymnadenia albida, Carex carvula, Calamagrostis villosa)
- Illyrian Province (Bosnia and Herzegovina, Serbia, Kosovo, North Macedonia, parts of Slovenia, Croatia, Montenegro, Albania, Bulgaria, Greece and Turkey) with several endemic genera (e.g. Haberlea) and many endemic species (e.g. Ramonda heldreichii, Ramonda nathaliae, Ramonda serbica, Picea omorika, Pinus heldreichii, Pinus peuce, Rheum rhaponticum, Aesculus hippocastanum, Forsythia europaea, Lathraea rhodopea, Wulfenia baldacci, Solenanthus scardicus, Amphoricarpus neumayeri, Narthecium scardicum, Dioscorea balcanica)
- Euxinian Province (parts of Bulgaria, Turkey, Georgia and Russia around the Black Sea), with two endemic genera (Chymsidia and Megacaryon) and many endemic species (e.g. Abies nordmanniana, Epimedium pubigerum, Quercus pontica, Quercus hartwissiana, Веtula medwedewii, Вetula megrelica, Corylus colchica, Сorylus pontica, Paeonia wittmanniana, Hypericum bupleuroides, Hypericum xylosteifolium, Rhododendron ungernii, Rhododendron smirnovii, Epigaea gaultherioides, Primula megaseifolia, Cyclamen adsharicum, Andrachne colchica, Trapa colchica, Staphylea colchica, Hedera colchica, Astrantia pontica, Heracleum mantegazzianum, Seseli rupicola, Rhamnus imeretinus, Osmanthus decorus, Trachystemon orientale, Rhamphicarpa medwedewii, Gentiana paradoxa, Scabiosa olgae, Campanula mirabilis, Campanula lactiflora, Inula magnifica, Lilium ponticum, Ruscus colchicus, Dioscorea caucasica, Campanula mirabilis), some endemic species and genera shared with the Caucasian Province (see below).
- Caucasian Province (parts of Russia, Georgia, Armenia and Azerbaijan), with five endemic genera (Pseudovesicaria, Symphyoloma, Pseudobetckea, Trigonocaryum and Cladochaeta) and many endemic species (e.g. Betula raddeana, Papaver oreophilum, Corydalis pallidiflora, Сorydalis emanuelii, Cerastium kasbek, Сerastium argenteum, Сerastium multiflorum, Minuartia inamoena, Silena lacera, Gypsophila acutifolia, Dianthus fragrans, Sobolevskia caucasica, Draba bryoides, Draba elisabethae, Draba supranivalis, Draba molissima, Draba ossetica, Primula bayernii, Saxifraga subverticillata, Sedum stevenianum, Geranium renardii, Oxytropis owerinii, Genliana grossheimii, Gentinana septemfida var. lagodechiana, Gentiana marcowiczii, Veronica caucasica, Campanula andina, Centaurea amblyolepis, Lilium monadelphum, Galanthus latifolius, Ornithogalum magnum, Colchicum laetum, Asphodoline tenuior, Gagea helenae, Calamagrostis caucasica), many endemic species and genera shared with the Euxinian Province (e.g. Agasyllis, Sredinskya, Rhododendron caucasicum, Vaccinium arctostaphylos, Daphne pontica, Paris incompleta).
- Eastern European Province (parts of Estonia, Latvia, Lithuania, Russia, Belarus, Ukraine, Moldova and Romania) without endemic genera, with some endemic species (e.g. Anemone uralensis, Papaver maeoticum, Dianthus eugeniae, Dianthus krylovianus, Dianthus volgicus, Diplotaxis cretacea, Sisymbrium wolgense, Syrenia talievii, Pyrus rossica, Hedysarum cretaceum, Нedysarum ucrainicum, Erodium beketowii, Linaria cretacea, Linaria macroura, Scrophularia cretacea)
- Northern European Province (parts of Finland, Sweden, Norway and Russia), without endemic genera, with but few endemic species (e.g. Corispermum algidum, Castilleja schrenkii)
- West Siberian Province (parts of Russia and Kazakhstan), without endemic genera, with few endemic species
- Altai-Sayan Province (Parts of Russia and Mongolia), with one endemic genus (Microstigma) and many endemic species (e.g. Callianthemum sajanense, Eranthis sibirica, Aquilegia borodinii, Delphinium mirabile, Delphinium inconspicuum, Aconitum krylovii, Aconitum altaicum, Anemone baicalensis, Ranunculus sajanensis, Gymnospermium altaicum, Betula kelleriana, Stellaria martjanovii, Stellaria imbricata, Stellaria irrigua, Silene turgida, Aphragmus involucratus, Erysimum inense, Euphorbia alpina, Euphorbia altaica, Euphorbia tshuiensis, Rhodiola algida, Sedum populifolium, Chrysosplenium filipes, Caragana altaica, Vicia lilacina, Lathyrus frolovii, Lathyrus krylovii, Linum violascens, Scrophularia altaica, Schizonepeta annua, Valeriana petrophila, Brachanthemum baranovii, Echinops humilis, Saussurea serratuloides, Saussurea sajanensis, Allium pumilum, Carex tatjanae, species of Astragalus and Oxytropis)
- Central Siberian Province (parts of Russia) without endemic genera, with but few endemic species
- Transbaikalian Province (Parts of Russia and Mongolia) without endemic genera, with some endemic species (e.g. Aconitum montibaicalensis, Draba baicalensis, Saxifraga algisii, Potentilla adenotricha, Astragalus trigonocarpus, Oxytropis heterotricha, Mertensia serrulata)
- Northeastern Siberian Province (parts of Russia), with one endemic genus (Gorodkovia) and many endemic species (e.g. Corydalis gorodkovii, Androsace gorodkovii, Saxifraga anadyrensis, Potentilla anadyrensis, Potentilla tollii, Helictotrichon krylovii, Poa lanatiflora).
- Okhotsk-Kamchatkan Province (parts of Russia), with one endemic genus (Redowskia) and many endemic species (e.g. Abies gracilis, Picea kamtschatkensis, Delphinium ochotense, Aconitum ajanense, Aconitum ochotense, Corydalis redowskii, Stellaria peduncularis, Arenaria redowskii, Lychnis ajanensis, Sorbus kamtschatcensis, Oxytropis ajanensis, Oxytropis tilingii, Sambucus kamtschatica).

- Canadian Province (St. Pierre and Miquelon, parts of Canada and the United States)

== See also ==
- Flora of Azerbaijan
- Flora of Canada
- Flora of the Faroe Islands
- Flora of Lithuania
- Flora of North Macedonia
- Flora of Romania
- Flora of Svalbard
- List of the vascular plants of Britain and Ireland
- List of the vascular plants of the Karelian Isthmus

== Bibliography ==
- C.Michael Hogan. 2011. Taiga. eds. M.McGinley & C.Cleveland. Encyclopedia of Earth. National Council for Science and the Environment. Washington DC
- David Lewis Lentz. 2000. Imperfect balance: landscape transformations in the Precolumbian Americas, Science, 547 pages, page
- Robert F. Thorne. Phytogeography of North America North of Mexico. Flora of North America, Vol. 1, Ch. 6.
