= R. abietina =

R. abietina may refer to:

- Rosa abietina, species of rose
- Russula abietina, species of mushroom
- Ramaria abietina, a former name for Phaeoclavulina abietina
