= Microstigma =

Microstigma is the scientific name of two genera of organisms and may refer to:

- Microstigma (damselfly), a genus of insects in the family Coenagrionidae
- Microstigma (plant), a genus of plants in the family Brassicaceae
