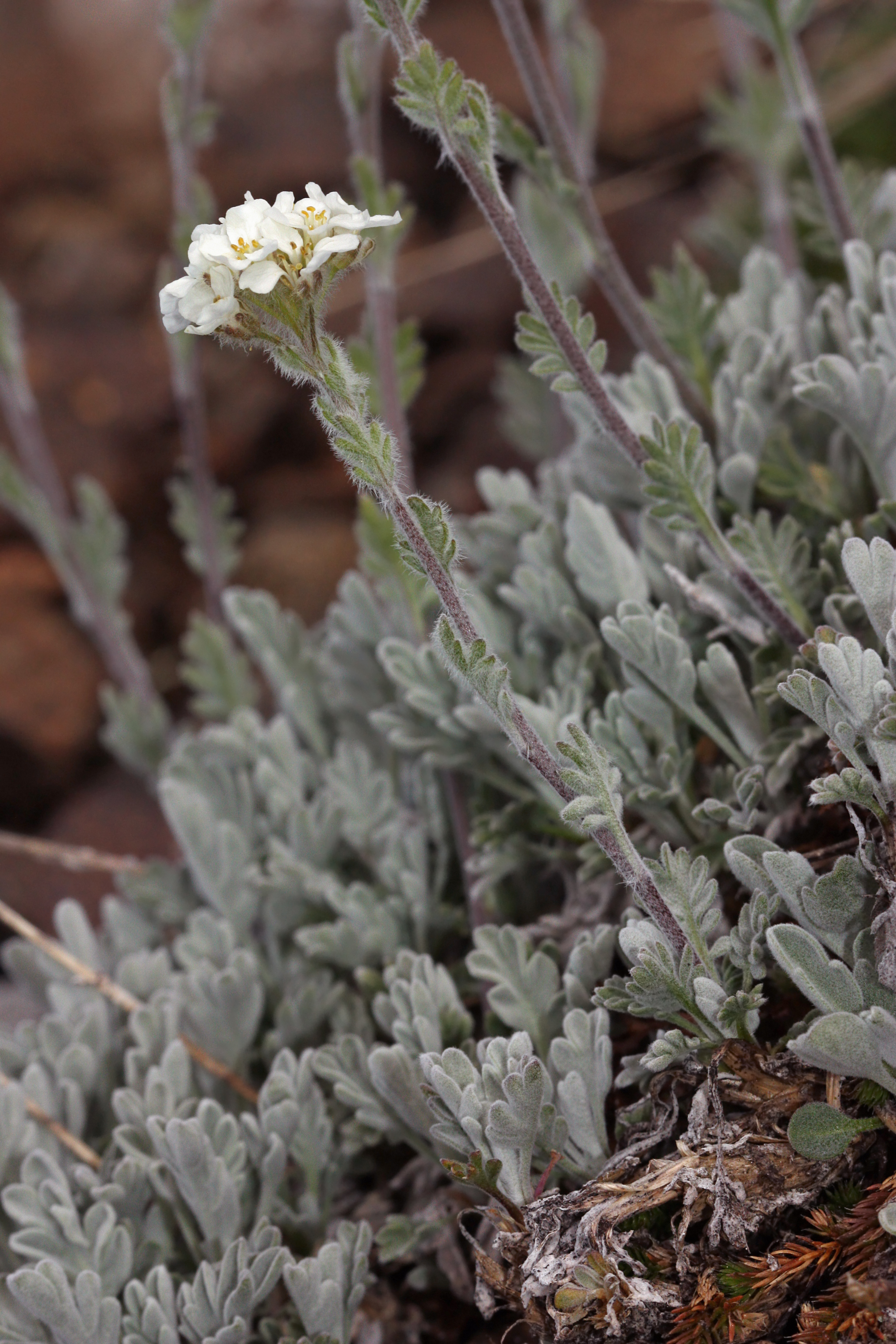

Conservation status
- Apparently Secure (NatureServe)

Scientific classification
- Kingdom: Plantae
- Clade: Tracheophytes
- Clade: Angiosperms
- Clade: Eudicots
- Clade: Rosids
- Order: Brassicales
- Family: Brassicaceae
- Genus: Smelowskia
- Species: S. americana

Binomial name
- Smelowskia americana Rydb.

= Smelowskia americana =

Species of flowering plant

Smelowskia americana is a species of Smelowskia known by the common names alpine smelowskia, Siberian smelowskia, and American false candytuft. Native to the mountain ranges of western North America including the Olympic Mountains and Cascade Range of Washington and the Rocky Mountains of British Columbia and Alberta south to Colorado, it occurs on rocky outcrops and talus at subalpine and alpine elevations, i.e., from 1,300–4,000 metres (4,300–13,100 ft), and blooms from late May until early September.

== Description ==
This perennial rhizomatous herb typically forms a grayish-green mat with more or less hairy stems reaching a maximum height of 1.5 centimeters to around 20 centimeters. The ovate or obovate basal leaves are 0.4–10 cm (0.16–3.94 in) long by 1–15 mm (0.039–0.591 in) wide, entire or pinnately lobed. They are borne on petioles that are about as long as the leaf. Leaves on the flower stem are similar but smaller and borne alternately on short petioles. A solitary flower-head is borne on a slender upright or ascending stem. Flowers have four white, or sometimes light-purple, petals 4–8 mm (0.16–0.31 in) long and six stamens with yellow anthers.

== Evolutionary history ==
The evolutionary history of the Smelowskia genus was examined in a study published in 2010 in the journal Taxon. Based on microsatellite and DNA sequences, the Smelowskia genus first appeared in Central Asia. From there it dispersed in two separate events to North America by means of the Beringian land bridge. Smelowskia americana, S. porsildii and S. media are the result of one of these dispersals. S. porsildii occurs in Beringia and S. media in the western Arctic of North America. S. americana is the most widely dispersed of the three species, i.e., on mid-latitude mountains of western North America. These three regions were free of glacial ice during the Last Glacial Maximum approximately 25,000–21,000 years ago. Consequently, these species may be the result of allopatric speciation in ice age refugia.
