= Flora of the Faroe Islands =

Plant species of the Faroe Islands

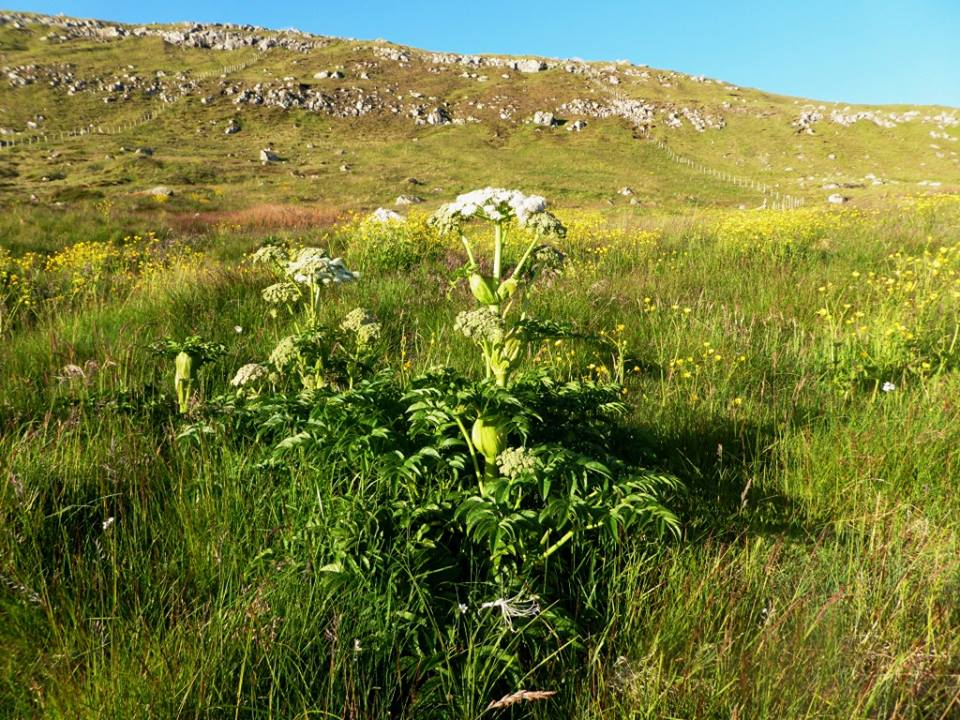
Outfield (hagi) near Kirkjubøur, Faroe Islands. Angelica archangelica and buttercup (Ranunculus).

The flora of the Faroe Islands consists of over 400 different plant species. Most of the lowland area is grassland and some is heather, mainly Calluna vulgaris. The Faroese nature is characterized by the lack of trees and resembles that of Connemara and Dingle in Ireland.

Among the numerous herbaceous flora that occur in the Faroe Islands is the marsh thistle, Cirsium palustre.

== Forests ==
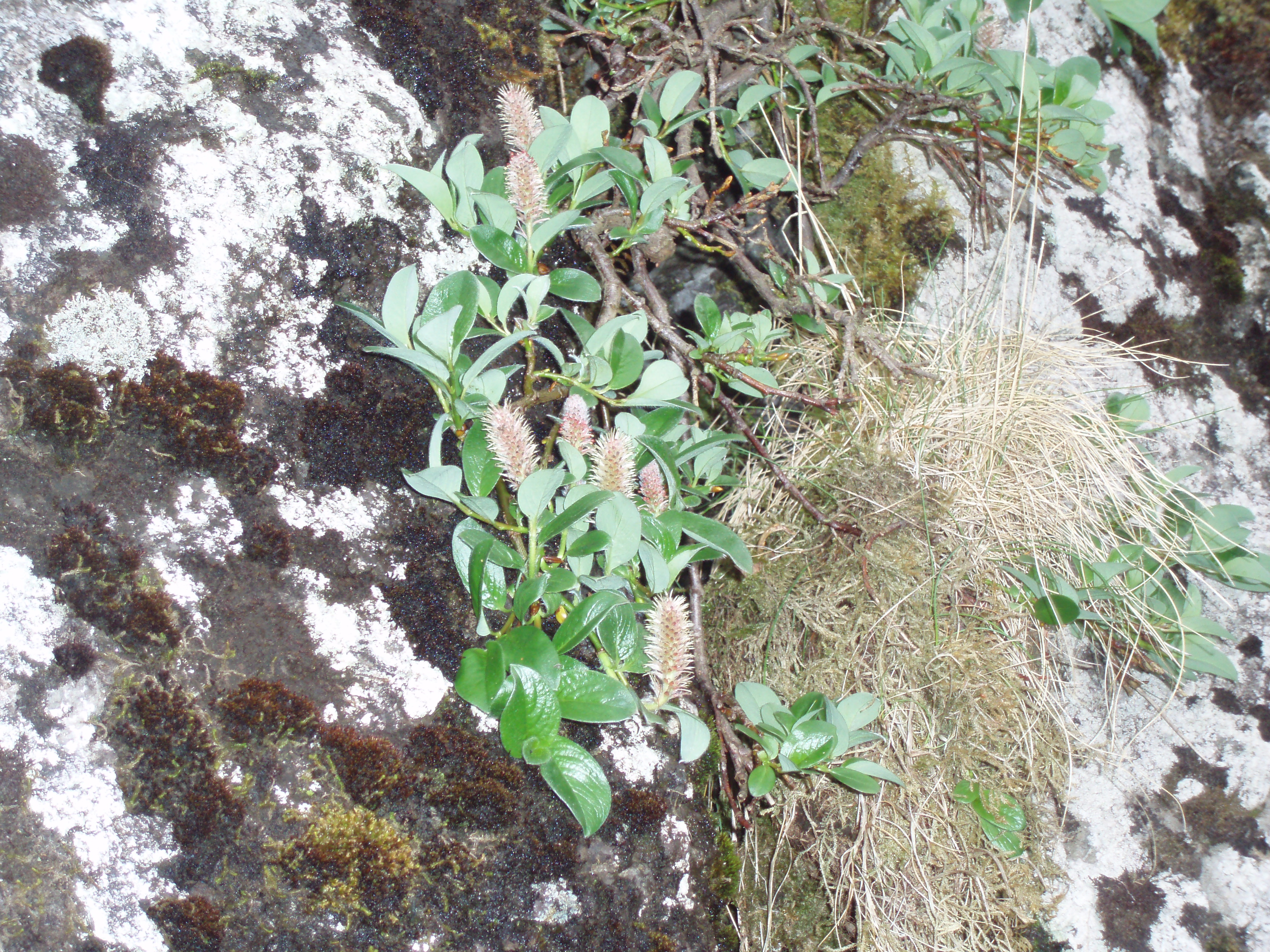
Arctic willow (Salix arctica) clinging to the mountain cliffs of Kunoy, Faroe Islands, out of reach from grazing animals.

There are no native forests in the Faroe Islands, and only a few woody plants occur. Findings of Betula pubescens trunks and branches in the soil, dated to c. 2300 BC, and the abundance of Corylus pollen in deep layers, suggest that at least some local stands of birch and hazel trees were present in the Faroe Islands, prior to human settlement.

Four species of willow are still present in the Faroe Islands: Salix herbacea is very common in the mountains, but the other three species: Salix phylicifolia, Salix lanata and Salix arctica are only to be found in a few places, due to heavy grazing by animals. Only one evergreen, Juniperus communis (the prostrate form) grows naturally in the Faroe Islands, and small populations are spread throughout the islands, though for some reason juniper is very common on Svínoy Island.

== Introduced species ==
The extreme oceanic climate, with winds whipping vast quantities of sea salt into the air, makes the islands very unfavourable to trees, though a few species from South America have been introduced since the 1970s. One outstanding for its beauty and for having resisted strong storms and cool summers is the monkey-puzzle tree from Argentina, Chile and Brazil. Trees from the Magellanic subpolar forest of Tierra del Fuego: Drimys winteri, Maytenus magellanica, Embothrium coccineum, Nothofagus antarctica, Nothofagus pumilio, and Nothofagus betuloides, have thrived too, in this cold oceanic climate. In 1979, 6000 small Nothofagus plants were transferred from Tierra del Fuego to the Faroe Islands, making it the biggest Nothofagus population in Europe. Species from the Alaskan coastline and islands have also adapted well in the Faroe Islands, especially Pinus contorta, Picea sitchensis, Salix alaxensis, Populus trichocarpa and Alnus sinuata. The biggest Alaskan pine tree (Pinus contorta) in Europe (in width, not in height), is to be found in the Selatrað plantation in the Faroe Islands.

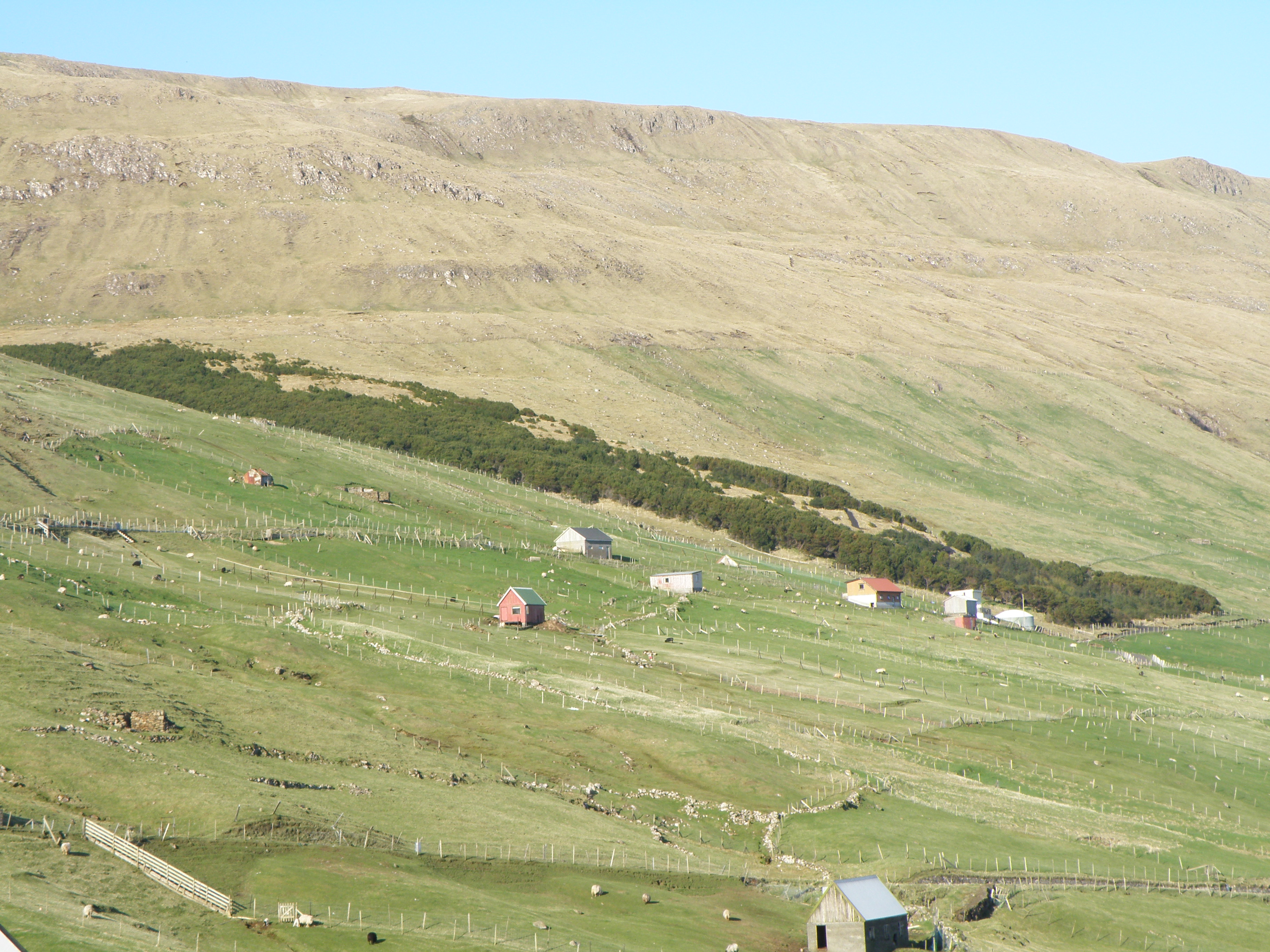
Introduced trees near Vágur protected from sheep grazing by fence.

Generally, introduced tree and plant species from the oceanic climates of coastal Alaska, New Zealand, Tierra del Fuego and Tasmania are adapted to Faroe, while introduced non native species from the more continental climates of Scandinavia and the rest of Northern Europe do not show that virtue because of intolerance to the wind and the lack of summer heat.

Lady's Mantle (Alchemilla mollis), first introduced as a garden plant, has become notoriously invasive and hard to get rid of. Though some few localities have met with success in combating it, it seems to spread further every year, eliciting fears that it might exterminate some of the local flora if drastic measures are not taken.
