= Smelowskia ovalis =

Scientific classification
- Kingdom: Plantae
- Clade: Tracheophytes
- Clade: Angiosperms
- Clade: Eudicots
- Clade: Rosids
- Order: Brassicales
- Family: Brassicaceae
- Genus: Smelowskia
- Species: S. ovalis

Binomial name
- Smelowskia ovalis M.E.Jones

Species of flowering plant

Smelowskia ovalis is a species of flowering plant in the mustard family known by the common name alpine false candytuft. It is native to western North America from British Columbia to northern California, occurring mostly in the Cascade Range. It is a plant of alpine climates, growing in high mountain habitats such as talus and fellfields. It is clumpy in shape, producing several hairy stems growing upright to a maximum height around 18 centimeters. The densely hairy leaves are divided into several oval leaflets. The longest leaves are arranged around the base of the plant, and a few smaller ones occur higher up the stems. The inflorescence is a dense, spherical raceme of flowers that elongates as the fruits develop. The flowers have white or pink-tinged petals each a few millimeters long. The fruit is a short silique.
