= Caropsis =

Scientific classification
- Kingdom: Plantae
- Clade: Tracheophytes
- Clade: Angiosperms
- Clade: Eudicots
- Clade: Asterids
- Order: Apiales
- Family: Apiaceae
- Genus: Caropsis (Rouy & E.G.Camus) Rauschert
- Species: C. verticillatoinundata

Binomial name
- Caropsis verticillatoinundata (Thore) Rauschert

Synonyms
- Genus: Thorea Briq., nom. illeg.; Thorella Briq., nom. illeg.; Species: Apium thorei (Gren. & Godr.) Calest.; Carum intermedium (DC.) Benth. & Hook.f., not validly publ.; Carum inundatum Lesp.; Carum thorei (Gren. & Godr.) Benth. & Hook.f., not validly publ.; Helosciadium bulbosum W.D.J.Koch; Helosciadium intermedium (DC.) DC.; Petroselinum intermedium (DC.) Rchb.f.; Petroselinum thorei (Gren. & Godr.) Coss. ex Rchb.f.; Ptychotis intermedia (DC.) Dörfl.; Ptychotis thorei Gren. & Godr.; Ptychotis verticillatoinundatum (Thore) M.Hiroe; Sium bulbosum Thore; Sium intermedium DC.; Sison verticillatoinundatum Thore; Thorella bulbosa (Thore) P.Fourn.; Thorella verticillatoinundata (Thore) Briq.

Genus of flowering plants

Caropsis is a genus of flowering plants in the family Apiaceae. Its only species is Caropsis verticillatoinundata, native to France and Portugal.
