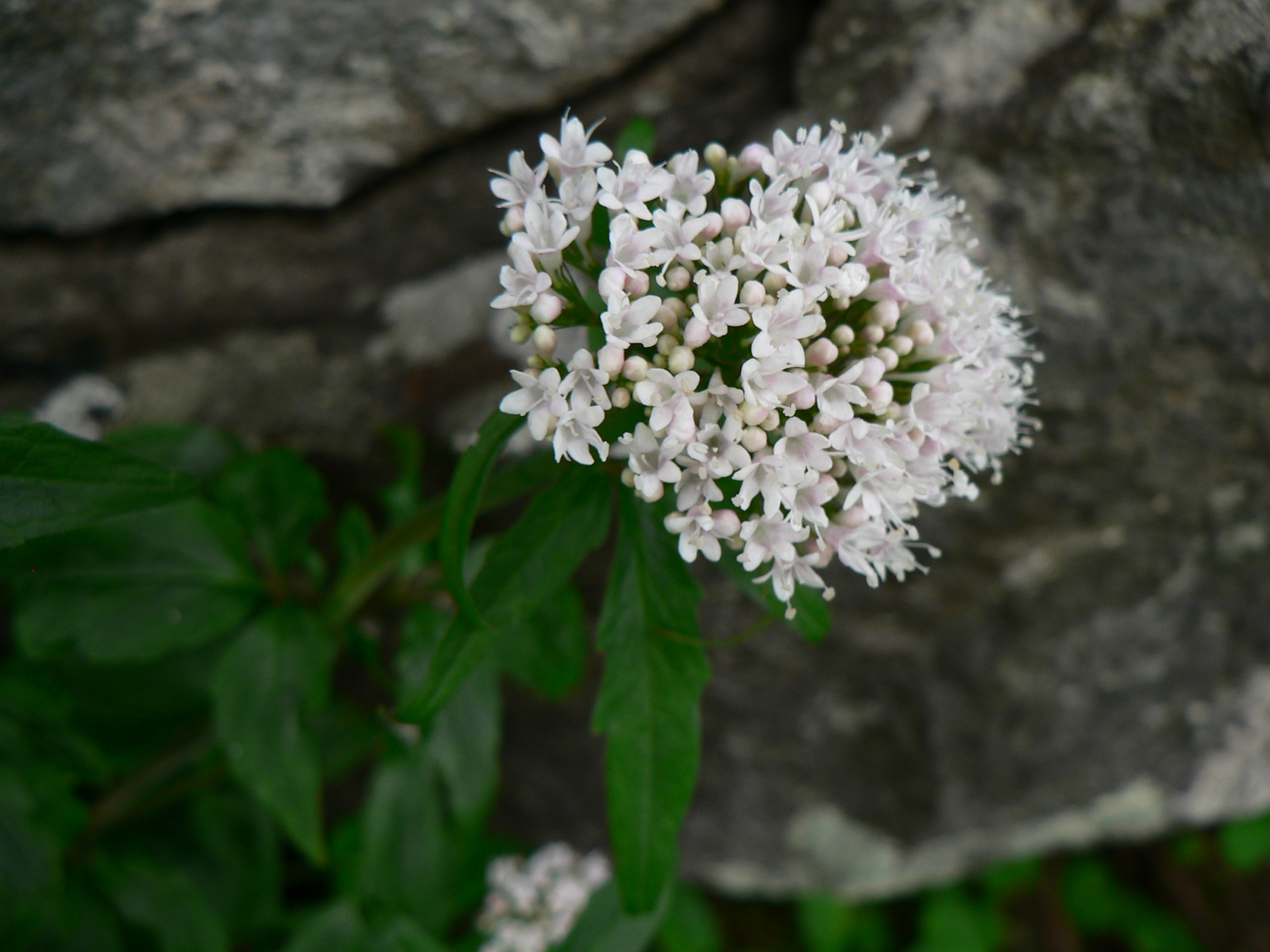

Scientific classification
- Kingdom: Plantae
- Clade: Embryophytes
- Clade: Tracheophytes
- Clade: Spermatophytes
- Clade: Angiosperms
- Clade: Eudicots
- Clade: Asterids
- Order: Dipsacales
- Family: Caprifoliaceae
- Genus: Valeriana
- Species: V. tripteris

Binomial name
- Valeriana tripteris L.

= Valeriana tripteris =

Species of flowering plant

Valeriana tripteris is a flowering plant in the family Caprifoliaceae native to Europe.
