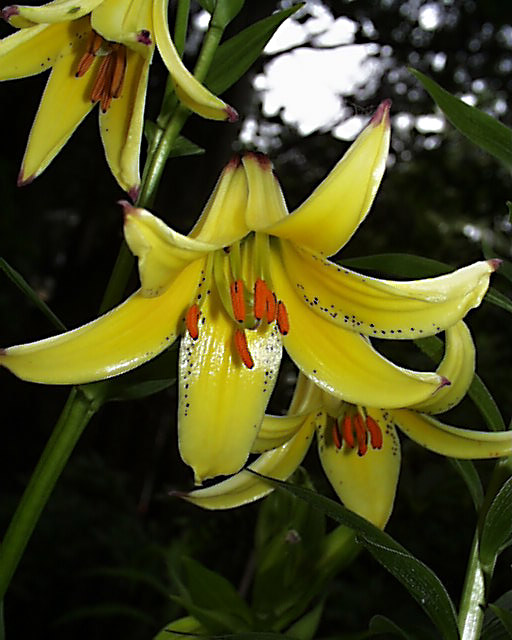

Scientific classification
- Kingdom: Plantae
- Clade: Tracheophytes
- Clade: Angiosperms
- Clade: Monocots
- Order: Liliales
- Family: Liliaceae
- Subfamily: Lilioideae
- Tribe: Lilieae
- Genus: Lilium
- Species: L. monadelphum

Binomial name
- Lilium monadelphum Bieb.

Synonyms
- Lilium loddigesianum Schult. & Schult.f.; Lilium georgicum Manden.

= Lilium monadelphum =

Species of lily

Lilium monadelphum is a bulbous plant native to Crimea and to North and South Caucasus.

== Description ==
Lilium monadelphum grows from 0.5 to 2 metres (1.5 to 6 feet) tall. The flowers have reflexed tepals (tepals bent backward), in banana yellow with purple spots.

formerly included

- Lilium monadelphum subsp. armenum, now called Lilium armenum
- Lilium monadelphum var. ledebourii, now called Lilium ledebourii
- Lilium monadelphum var. szovitsianum, now called Lilium szovitsianum
