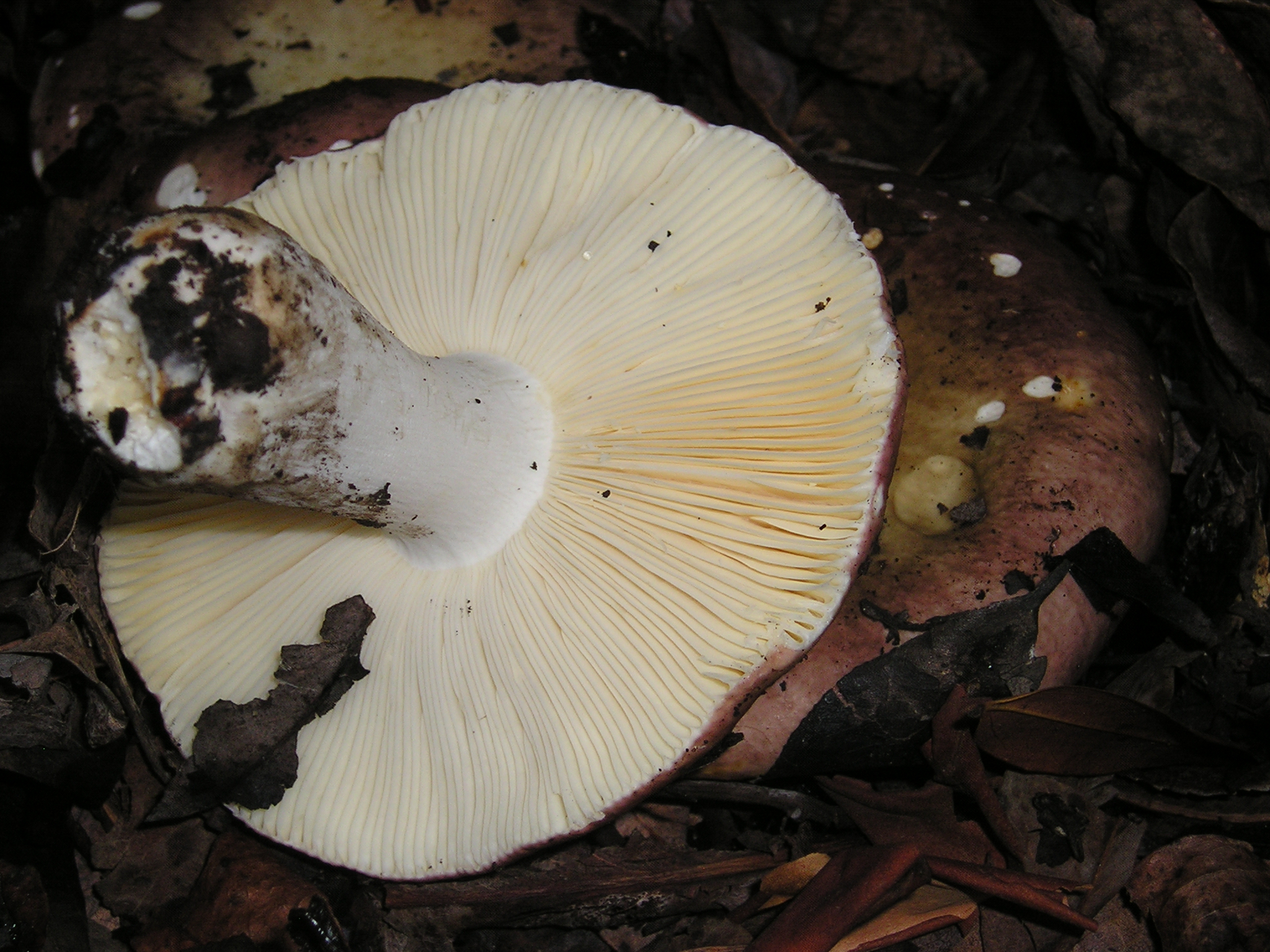

Scientific classification
- Kingdom: Fungi
- Division: Basidiomycota
- Class: Agaricomycetes
- Order: Russulales
- Family: Russulaceae
- Genus: Russula
- Species: R. puellaris

Binomial name
- Russula puellaris Fr. (1838)

Synonyms
- Russula abietina Peck 1902

= Russula abietina =

Species of fungus

Russula puellaris is a species of mushroom. The cap ranges from 3 to 7 cm wide, and is pink, purple or brown, with a darker red center. The odor and taste are mild. Its edibility is unknown, but it is too small to be of interest. The spores are yellow, subglobose, and slightly bumpy. Similar species include Russula cessans and Russula queletii.
