= Allium pumilum =

Scientific classification
- Kingdom: Plantae
- Clade: Tracheophytes
- Clade: Angiosperms
- Clade: Monocots
- Order: Asparagales
- Family: Amaryllidaceae
- Subfamily: Allioideae
- Genus: Allium
- Species: A. pumilum

Binomial name
- Allium pumilum Vved.

Species of flowering plant

Allium pumilum, commonly known as dwarf chives, is a species of flowering plant in the family Amaryllidaceae. The species is native to Russia and Mongolia, and was described in 1934.

== Taxonomy ==
The species was described by Alexei Ivanovich Vvedensky in 1934.

== Distribution ==
Allium pumilum is native to the temperate biome of Mongolia and Russia (Altay and Tuva).

== Description ==
Allium pumilum has underground storage organs.

== Nomenclature ==
In English, Allium pumilum is commonly known as "Dwarf chives". In Russian, it is known as Лук низкий (Luk nizkij).
