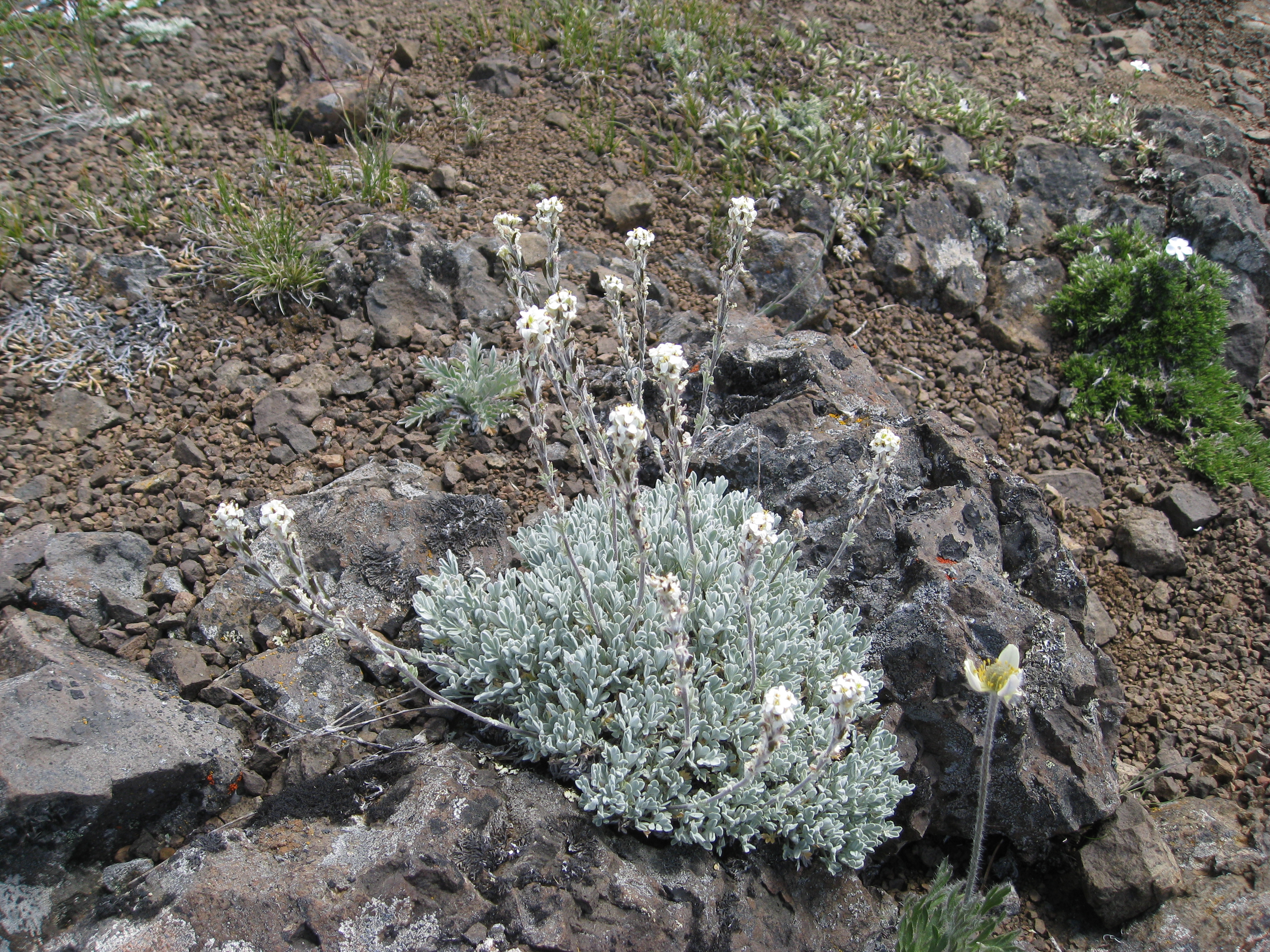
- Smelowskia calycina

Scientific classification
- Kingdom: Plantae
- Clade: Tracheophytes
- Clade: Angiosperms
- Clade: Eudicots
- Clade: Rosids
- Order: Brassicales
- Family: Brassicaceae
- Genus: Smelowskia; C.A.Mey.

Species
- See text

Synonyms
- Chrysanthemopsis Rech.f.; Ermania Cham., Linnaea; Ermania Cham. ex Botsch., Gorodkovia Botsch. & Karav.; Hediniopsis Botsch. & V.V.Petrovsky; Redowskia Cham. & Schltdl.</sma; Sinosophiopsis Al-Shehbaz; Sophiopsis O.E.Schulz

= Smelowskia =

Genus of plants in the cabbage family

Smelowskia, sometimes called false candytufts, is a genus of flowering plants in the crucifer family Brassicaceae, native to mountains and arctic regions of Asia and western North America. They may or may not be of Beringian origin.

== Species ==
Currently accepted species include:

- Smelowskia alba (Pall.) Regel
- Smelowskia altaica (Pobed.) Botsch.
- Smelowskia americana Rydb.
- Smelowskia annua Rupr.
- Smelowskia bartholomewii (Al-Shehbaz) Al-Shehbaz & Warwick
- Smelowskia bifurcata (Turcz. ex Ledeb.) Botsch.
- Smelowskia borealis (Greene) W.H.Drury & Rollins
- Smelowskia calycina (Stephan ex Willd.) C.A.Mey.
- Smelowskia czukotica (Botsch. & V.V.Petrovsky) Al-Shehbaz & Warwick
- Smelowskia flavissima Kar. & Kir.
- Smelowskia furcata (Al-Shehbaz) Al-Shehbaz & Warwick
- Smelowskia heishuiensis (W.T.Wang) Al-Shehbaz & Warwick
- Smelowskia inopinata (Kom.) Kom.
- Smelowskia jacutica (Botsch. & Karav.) Al-Shehbaz & Warwick
- Smelowskia johnsonii G.A.Mulligan
- Smelowskia media (W.H.Drury & Rollins) E.M.Velichkin
- Smelowskia micrantha (Botsch. & Vved.) Al-Shehbaz & Warwick
- Smelowskia mongolica Kom.
- Smelowskia ovalis M.E.Jones
- Smelowskia parryoides (Cham.) Polunin
- Smelowskia pectinata (Bunge) E.M.Velichkin
- Smelowskia porsildii (W.H.Drury & Rollins) Jurtzev
- Smelowskia pyriformis W.H.Drury & Rollins
- Smelowskia sisymbrioides (Regel & Herder) Paulsen
- Smelowskia sophiifolia (Cham. & Schltdl.) Al-Shehbaz & Warwick

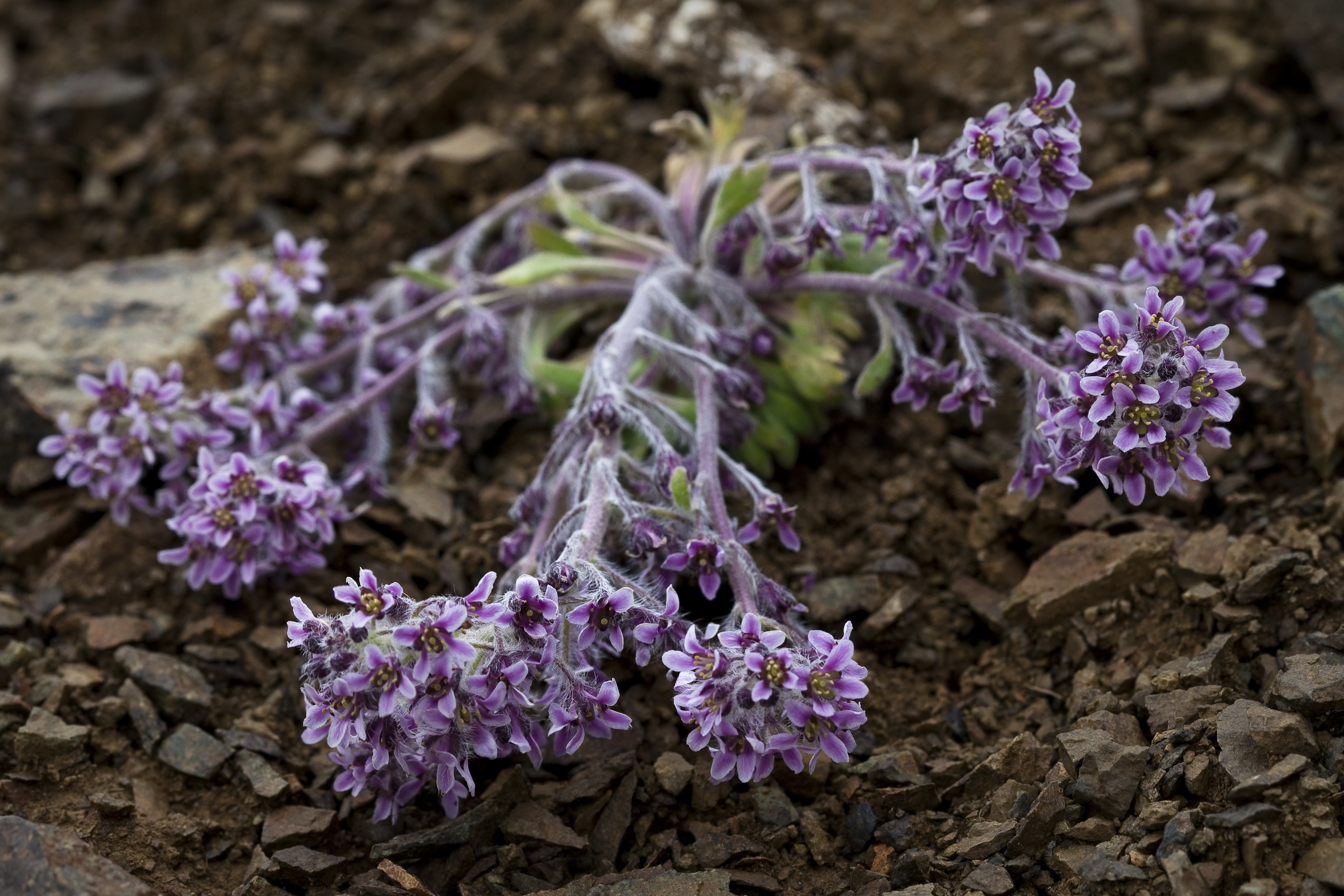
Smelowskia borealis on the slopes of Denali
