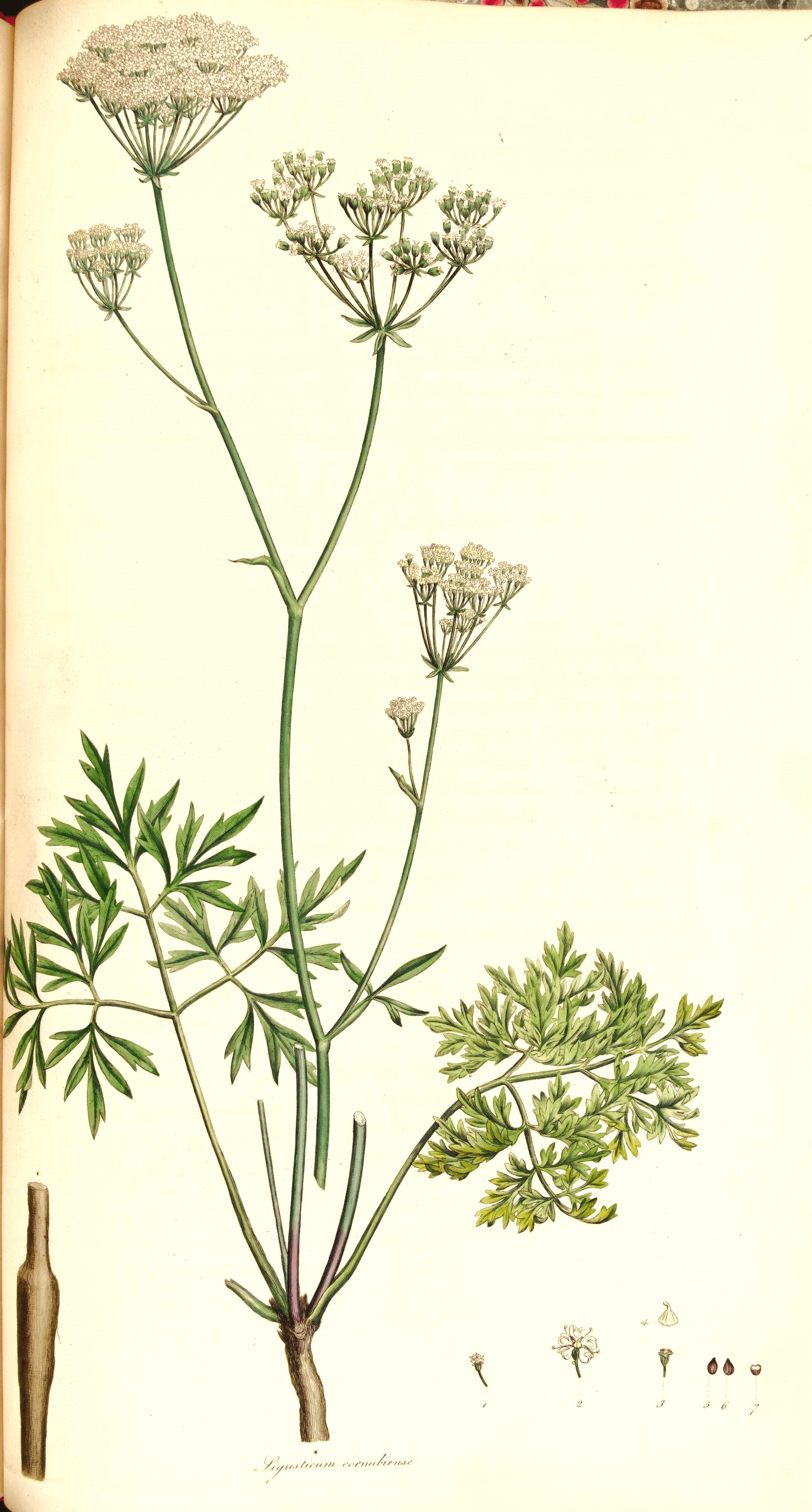

Scientific classification
- Kingdom: Plantae
- Clade: Tracheophytes
- Clade: Angiosperms
- Clade: Eudicots
- Clade: Asterids
- Order: Apiales
- Family: Apiaceae
- Subfamily: Apioideae
- Tribe: Pleurospermeae
- Genus: Physospermum; Cusson

= Physospermum =

Genus of plants

Physospermum is a genus of flowering plants belonging to the family Apiaceae.

Its native range is Europe to Iran, Algeria.

Species:

- Physospermum cornubiense (L.) DC.
- Physospermum verticillatum Vis.
