= Pseudovesicaria =

Scientific classification
- Kingdom: Plantae
- Clade: Tracheophytes
- Clade: Angiosperms
- Clade: Eudicots
- Clade: Rosids
- Order: Brassicales
- Family: Brassicaceae
- Genus: Pseudovesicaria (Boiss.) Rupr.
- Species: P. digitata

Binomial name
- Pseudovesicaria digitata (C.A.Mey.) Rupr.

Synonyms
- Alyssum digitatum (C.A.Mey.) Kuntze; Vesicaria digitata C.A.Mey.

Genus of plants

Pseudovesicaria is a genus of flowering plants belonging to the family Brassicaceae. It includes a single species, Pseudovesicaria digitata, which grown in subalpine areas of the northwestern Balkan Peninsula and the Caucasus.
