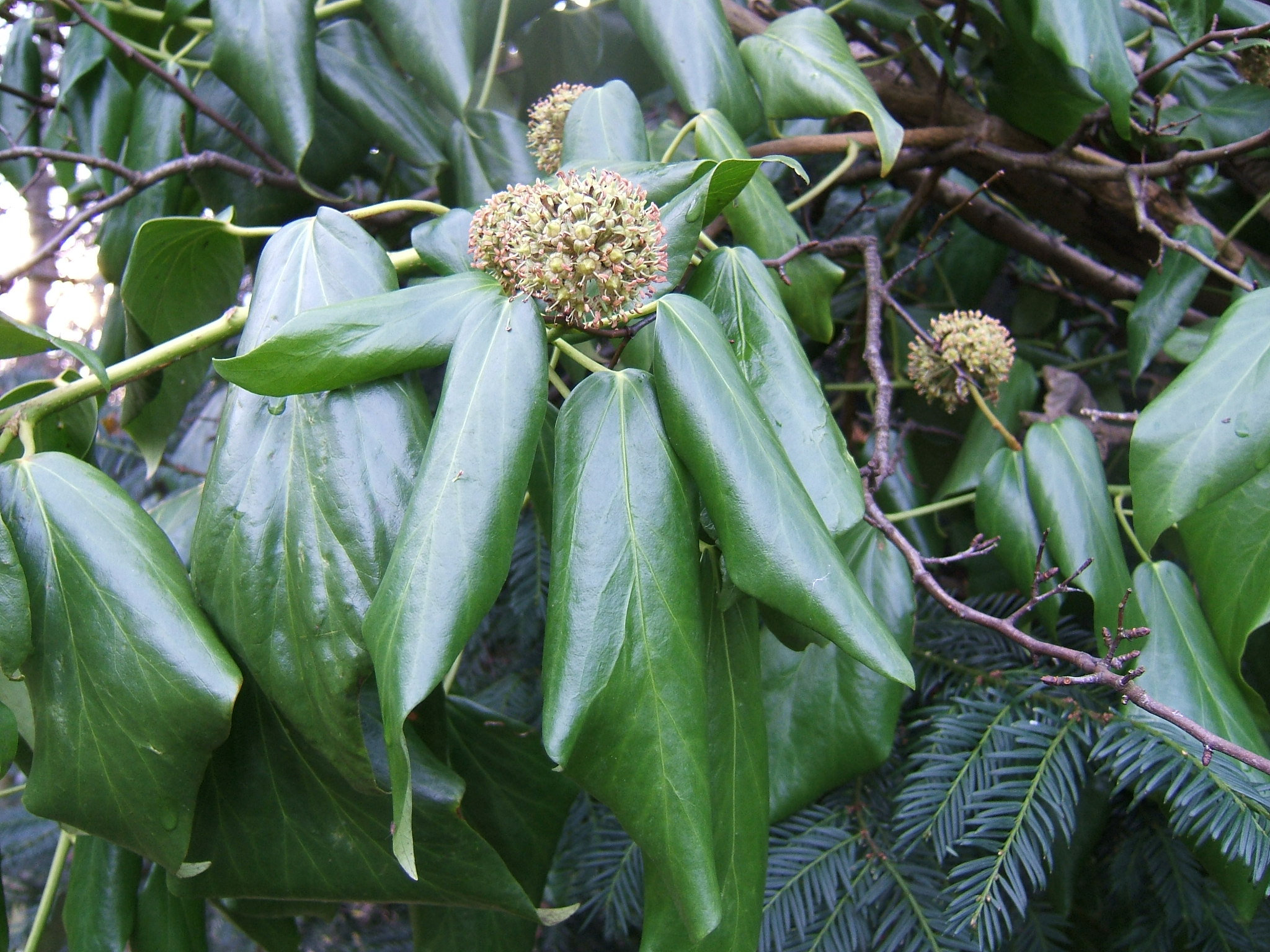
- Hedera colchica leaves and flowers

Scientific classification
- Kingdom: Plantae
- Clade: Embryophytes
- Clade: Tracheophytes
- Clade: Spermatophytes
- Clade: Angiosperms
- Clade: Eudicots
- Clade: Asterids
- Order: Apiales
- Family: Araliaceae
- Genus: Hedera
- Species: H. colchica

Binomial name
- Hedera colchica (K.Koch) K.Koch

Synonyms
- Hedera helix var. colchica K.Koch; Hedera acuta G.Nicholson; Hedera amurensis Hibberd ex Lawr. & Schulze; Hedera caucasica Carrière; Hedera colchica var. arborescens Paul; Hedera colchica f. arborescens (Paul) Rehder; Hedera colchica var. dentata (Hibberd) Lawr.; Hedera colchica f. dentata (Hibberd) Hibberd; Hedera colchica var. dentatovariegata A.E.Schulze; Hedera colchica f. dentatovariegata (A.E.Schulze) Geerinck; Hedera colchica f. flavovariegata P.D.Sell; Hedera colchica var. rhombifolia (Rupr. ex Regel) Boiss.; Hedera colchica var. variegata Ed.Otto; Hedera cordifolia Hibberd; Hedera coriacea Hibberd; Hedera coriacea var. dentata Hibberd; Hedera dentata (Hibberd) Carrière; Hedera helix var. dentata (Hibberd) G.Nicholson; Hedera helix var. roegneriana (Hibberd) G.Nicholson; Hedera rhombifolia Rupr. ex Regel; Hedera roegneriana Hibberd; Hedera roegneriana var. arborea Hibberd

= Hedera colchica =

Species of vine

Hedera colchica is a species of flowering plant in the family Araliaceae . It is native to the Middle East and commonly called Persian ivy or colchis ivy. It is an evergreen climbing plant, growing to 30 m high where suitable surfaces (trees, cliffs, walls) are available, and also growing as ground cover where there are no vertical surfaces. It climbs by means of aerial rootlets which cling to the substrate. In warm climates, it grows more rapidly and becomes established faster than other Hedera species.

== Description ==
The leaves are alternate, they are of two types, with palmately five-lobed juvenile leaves on creeping and climbing stems, and unlobed cordate adult leaves, lauroid type, on fertile flowering stems exposed to full sun, usually high in the crowns of trees or the top of rock faces. Stems are green. It has the largest leaves of any ivy to 15 cm wide and 25 cm long.

The flowers are produced from late summer until late autumn, individually small, greenish, produced in large numbers in umbels, and very rich in nectar, an important food source for bees and other insects. It flowers in September and fruits form during or after winter. The fruits are berries, globular and black when ripe. They are an important food for many birds. There are one to five seeds in each berry, which are dispersed by the birds swallowing the berries.

The following cultivars have gained the Royal Horticultural Society's Award of Garden Merit:

- H. colchica
- 'Dentata', commonly called Bullock's heart ivy, or Elephant's ears.
- 'Dentata variegata', synonyms 'Dentata aurea', 'Variegata'
- 'Sulphur heart', synonym 'Paddy's pride'

== Ecology ==
It is a woody evergreen climbing shrub, which can grow in a range of conditions. It prefers well-drained or alkaline soils rich in nutrients and humus with good water provision, but is extremely tough and adaptable. Like many climbing plants, it prefers its roots in cool shade with its crown in full sun. It can live over 400 years, reaching heights of 30m where suitable surfaces (trees, cliffs, walls) are available. It climbs by means of aerial rootlets with matted pads that cling strongly to the substrate. Its favoured distribution is humid microclimates, such as cloud forest, stream valleys, and the mountain ranges on the Turkish coast of the Black Sea, Asia minor, the Persian Gulf, Afghanistan, and some islands of the Red Sea.

== Etymology ==
The ancient Latin name for Ivy.

Derived from the name ‘Colchis’ or ‘Colchidis’, a Caucasian area once famous for producing poisons.
