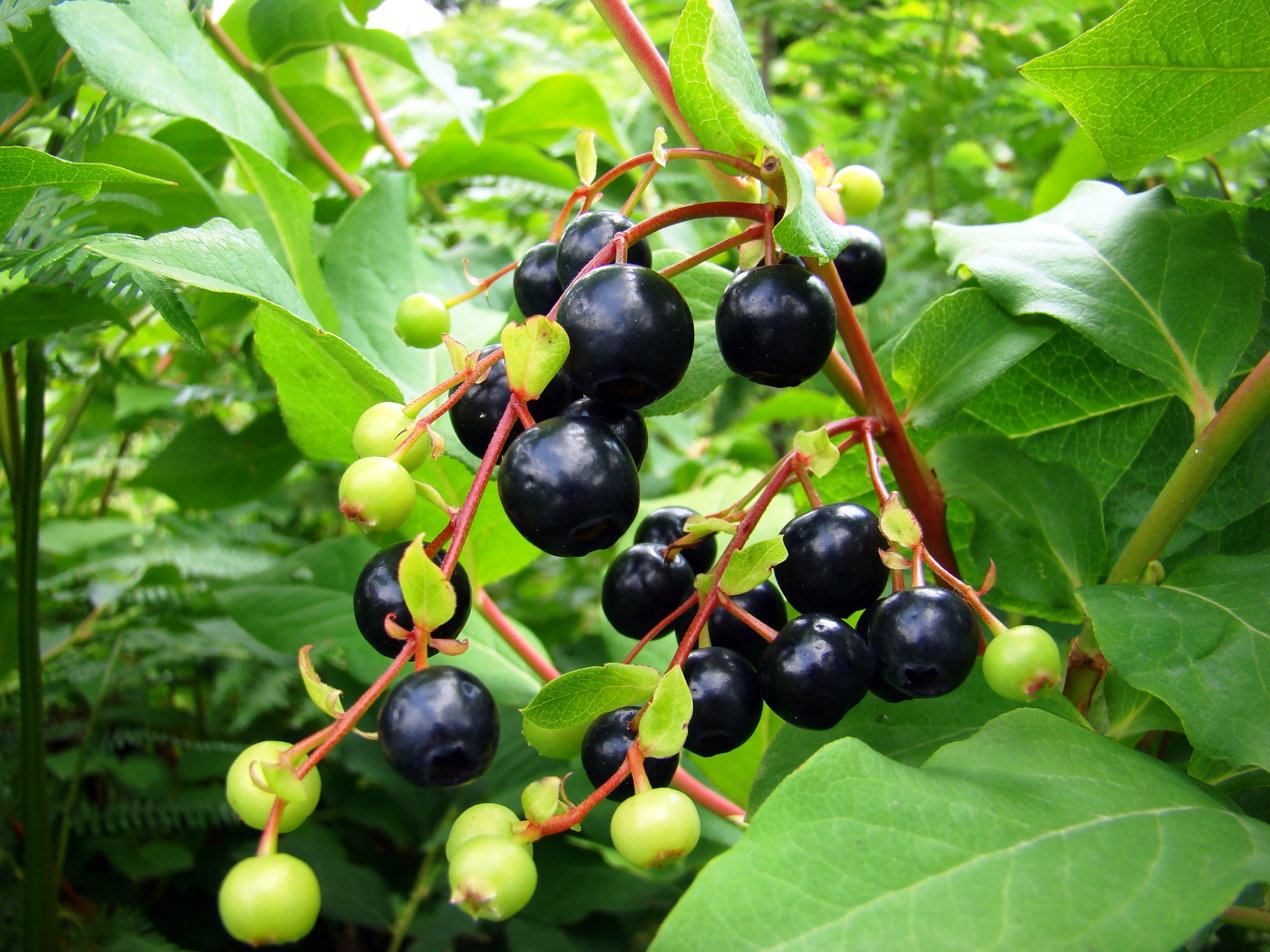

Conservation status
- Data Deficient (IUCN 3.1)

Scientific classification
- Kingdom: Plantae
- Clade: Tracheophytes
- Clade: Angiosperms
- Clade: Eudicots
- Clade: Asterids
- Order: Ericales
- Family: Ericaceae
- Genus: Vaccinium
- Section: Vaccinium sect. Hemimyrtillus
- Species: V. arctostaphylos

Binomial name
- Vaccinium arctostaphylos L.

= Vaccinium arctostaphylos =

Species of shrub

Vaccinium arctostaphylos or Caucasian whortleberry is a Eurasian species of shrub with edible fruit of blue color. Its cytology is 2n = 48.

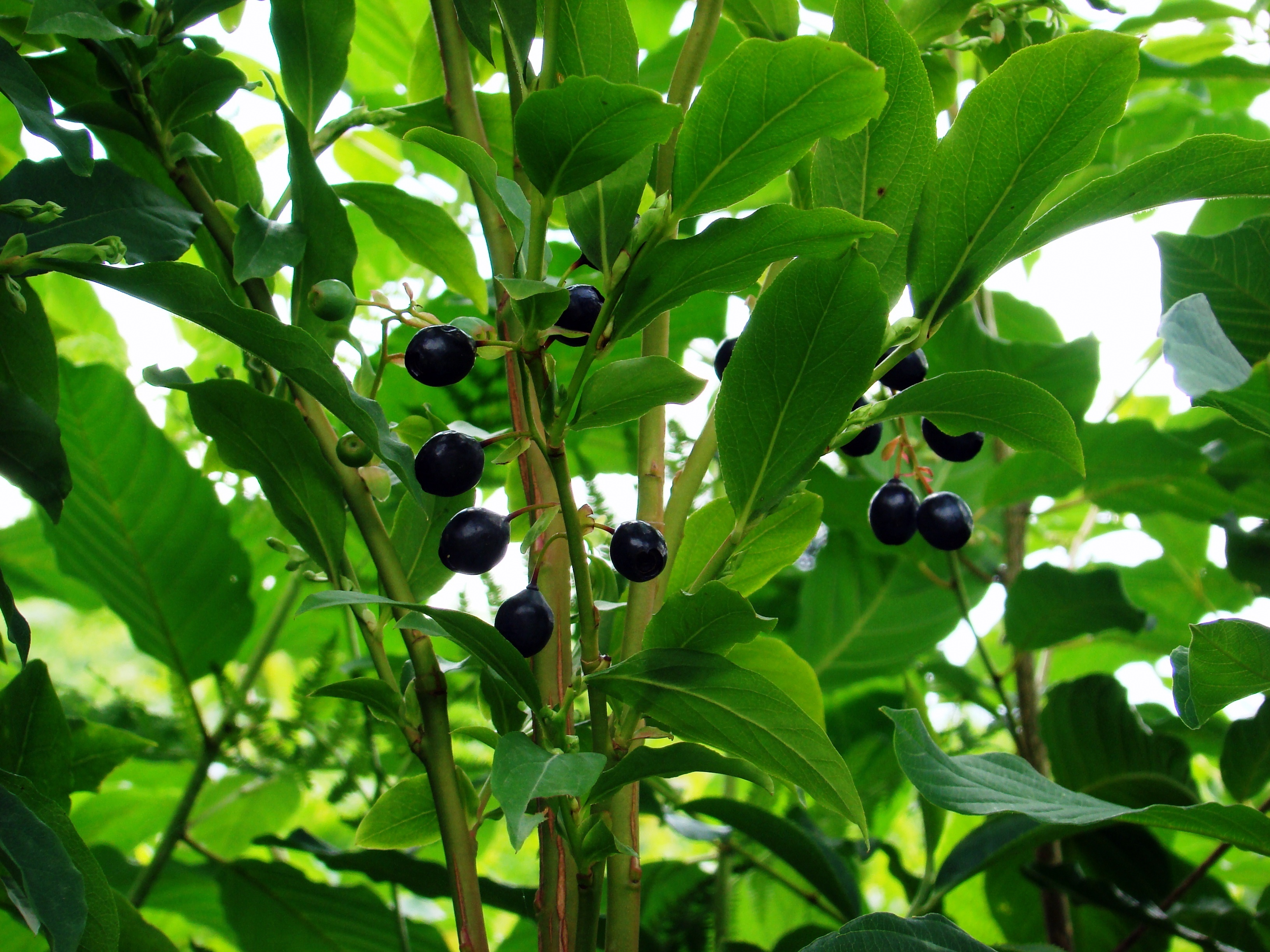
Vaccinium arctostaphylos plant

== Distribution and habitat ==
The species is native to Western Asia (Iran and Turkey), the Caucasus (Armenia; Azerbaijan; Georgia; Russia), and Southeastern Europe (Bulgaria).

== Medicinal effects ==
In a study on 50 hyperlipidaemic adult patients, an extract of the fruit of V. arctostaphylos was found to have beneficial effects on serum lipid profile and oxidative stress. Each medicinal capsule contained 45 ± 2 mg of anthocyanins.
