= Rhizobotrya =

Scientific classification
- Kingdom: Plantae
- Clade: Tracheophytes
- Clade: Angiosperms
- Clade: Eudicots
- Clade: Rosids
- Order: Brassicales
- Family: Brassicaceae
- Genus: Rhizobotrya; Tausch
- Species: R. alpina

Binomial name
- Rhizobotrya alpina Tausch

Synonyms
- Cochlearia brevicaulis Facchini ex W.D.J.Koch; Cochlearia rhizobotrya Walp.; Draba rhizobotyya Steud.; Kernera alpina (Tausch) Prantl

Genus of plants

Rhizobotrya is a genus of flowering plants belonging to the family Brassicaceae. It includes a single species, Rhizobotrya alpina, a perennial native to the southeastern Alps of Italy.
