= Flora of Lithuania =

Plant species of Lithuania

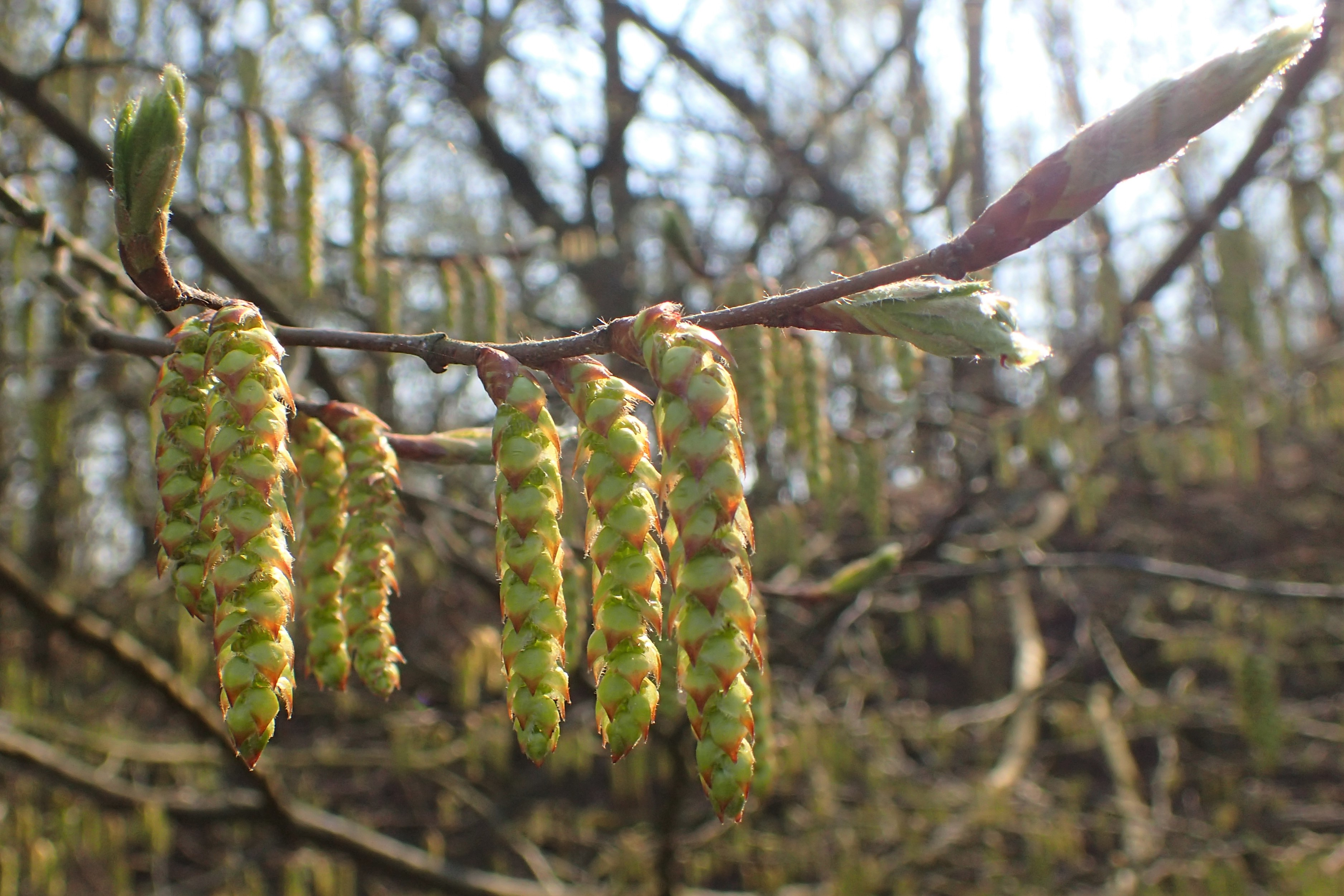
Carpinus betulus

The Flora of Lithuania is estimated to comprise about 10,600 species. About 1,350 of these are vascular plants; about 335 are bryophytes; and about 2,000 are algae. Lichens are represented by about 500 species, and fungi by about 6,400 species. About 550 of these species are considered extinct or threatened. Protected areas now cover more than 12% of the territory of Lithuania.

Lithuania lies both in the boreal and the broadleaved (angiosperm) forest belts. A variety of species are therefore found within its relatively small territory, including species characteristic of the southern taiga. The occurrence of the hornbeam species Carpinus betulus marks the border between the predominantly broadleaved zone in the south and the coniferous zone in the north.

== Biomes ==
=== Forests ===
Forest cover in Lithuania has waxed and waned along with its fortunes; as a general rule, times of prosperity led to deforestation for agricultural uses. This tendency was seen during the Soviet occupation; forest cover was about 20% in 1948, and increased to about 30% by 1990, when Lithuania regained its independence. It has since been relatively stable. The general consensus of scientific opinion is that the optimum forest cover for Lithuania is about 33%.

Conifers constitute about 60% of the total forest area. They are concentrated in the northern, western, and eastern, and far southern sections of the country. The principal conifers are Scots Pine at about 40%, and Norway Spruce at about 20%.

Broadleaf trees dominate in the central areas of the country. Birches constitute about 18% of the total, followed by Black Alder (about 8%) and European Aspen (about 8%); oak, ash, and elm make up the remainder.

Old growth forests are relatively rare in Lithuania, numbering about 100. Data collected in 1998 suggested that these forests occupied about 580 km^{2}.

=== Wetlands ===
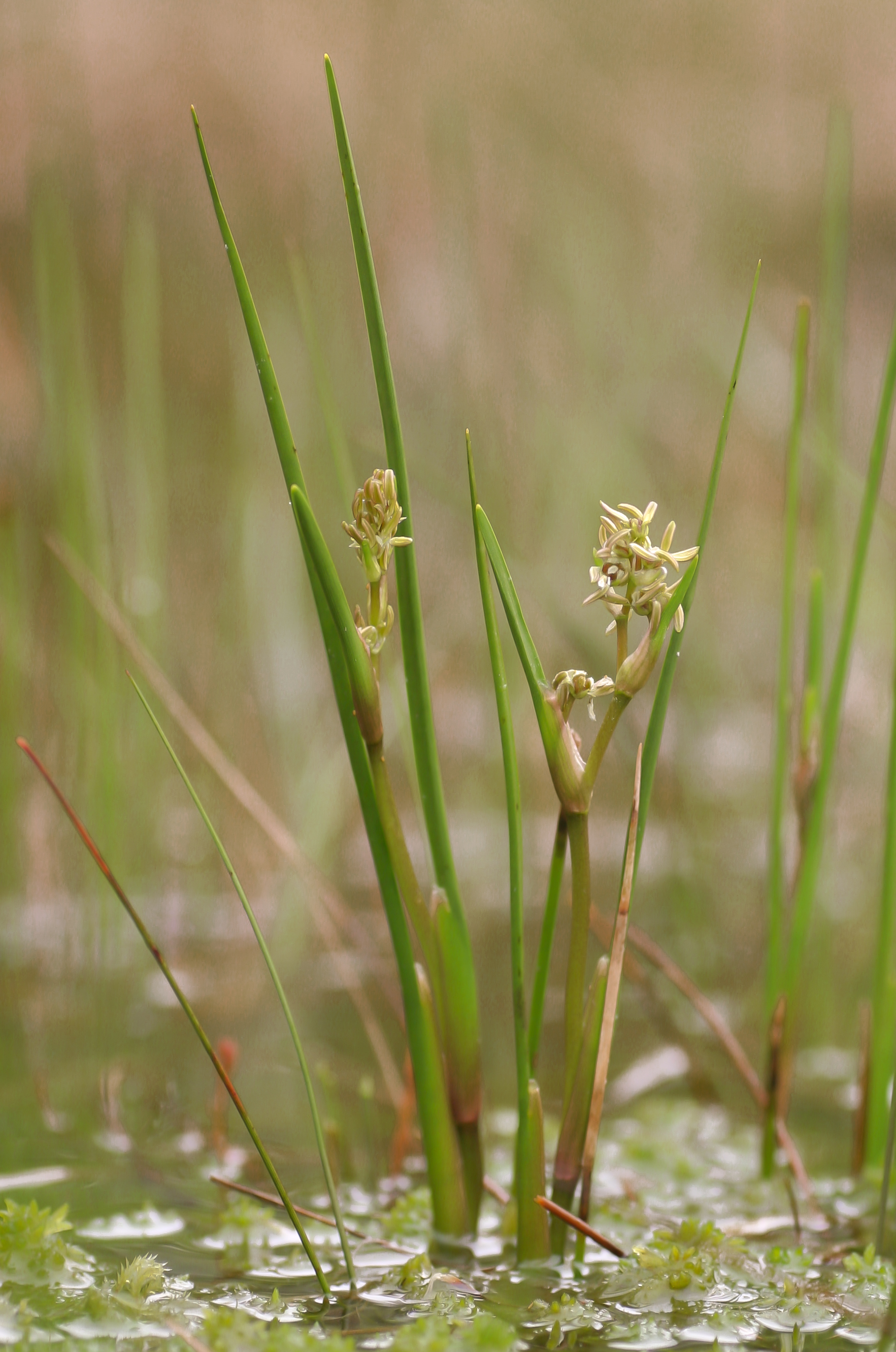
Scheuchzeria palustris

About 5% of Lithuania is covered by wetlands; a number of these are classified as peat bogs, with about 6,700 distinct areas. Characteristic species of the peat bogs include Scheuchzeria palustris, Eriophorum (cotton-grass), sundew, cloudberry, cranberry species, and Andromeda polifolia (bog-rosemary).

The peat bogs are sometimes subject to forest fires in the summer; about 280 such fires were noted between 1994 and 1999.

=== Riparian and lacustrine ===
Riparian and lacustrine (aquatic) flora present in Lithuania include duckweed, horsetails, bullrushes, sedges, and grasses.

== Crops ==
The principal crop plants in Lithuania are rye, wheat, oats, barley, peas, potatoes, sugar beet, and flax. About 46% of the country is covered by cropland.

In addition to these major crops, various mushroom species are harvested; several species of berries are harvested, sometimes from the wild; and Common Hawthorn, Thyme, and Hypericum are important medicinal species.

== Common weeds and invasive species ==
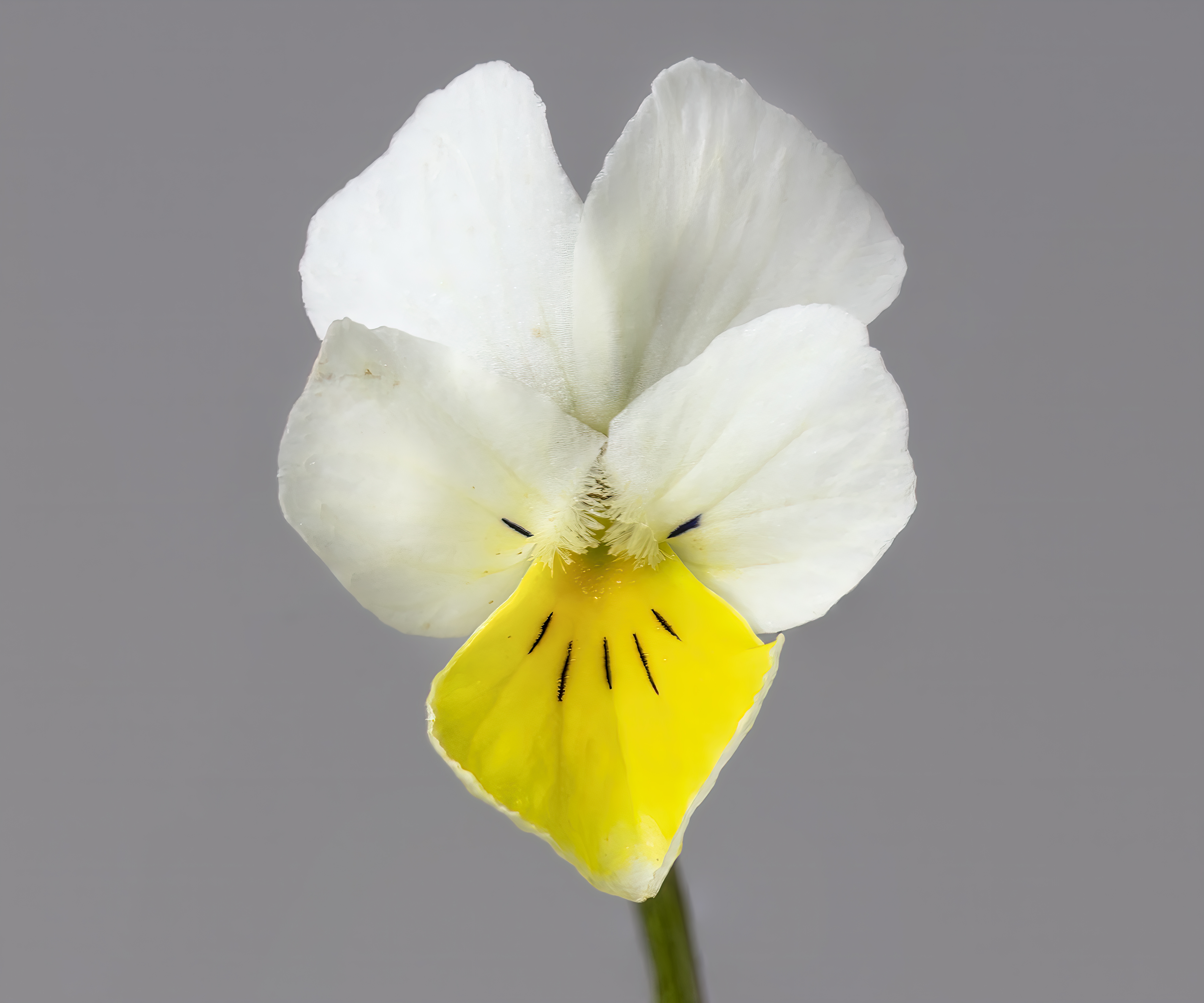
Viola arvensis

Crop weeds in Lithuania include Hordeum vulgare (spring barley), Capsella bursa-pastoris, Chenopodium album, Papaver rhoeas, Sinapis arvensis, Spergula arvensis, and Viola arvensis. Galinsoga parviflora is one of the most troubling invasive species.

== Botanical research institutions ==
- Institute of Botany
- Lithuanian Institute of Horticulture
- Lithuanian Institute of Agriculture
- Lithuanian Forest Research Institute
