= Cladochaeta candidissima =

Scientific classification
- Kingdom: Plantae
- Clade: Tracheophytes
- Clade: Angiosperms
- Clade: Eudicots
- Clade: Asterids
- Order: Asterales
- Family: Asteraceae
- Subfamily: Asteroideae
- Tribe: Gnaphalieae
- Genus: Cladochaeta; DC.
- Species: C. candidissima

Binomial name
- Cladochaeta candidissima (M.Bieb.) DC.

Synonyms
- Gnaphalium candidissimum M.Bieb.; Cladochaeta velutina Anderb.; Cladochaeta caspica Sosn. & Grossh.

Species of flowering plant

Cladochaeta is a genus of flowering plants in the family Asteraceae.

Cladochaeta grows in an upwards habit with erect, branching, herbaceous stems, usually oblong elliptical leaves, and small, yellow flowers on an inflorescence.

There is only one known species, Cladochaeta candidissima, native to the Caucasus (Azerbaijan, Georgia, Dagestan).
