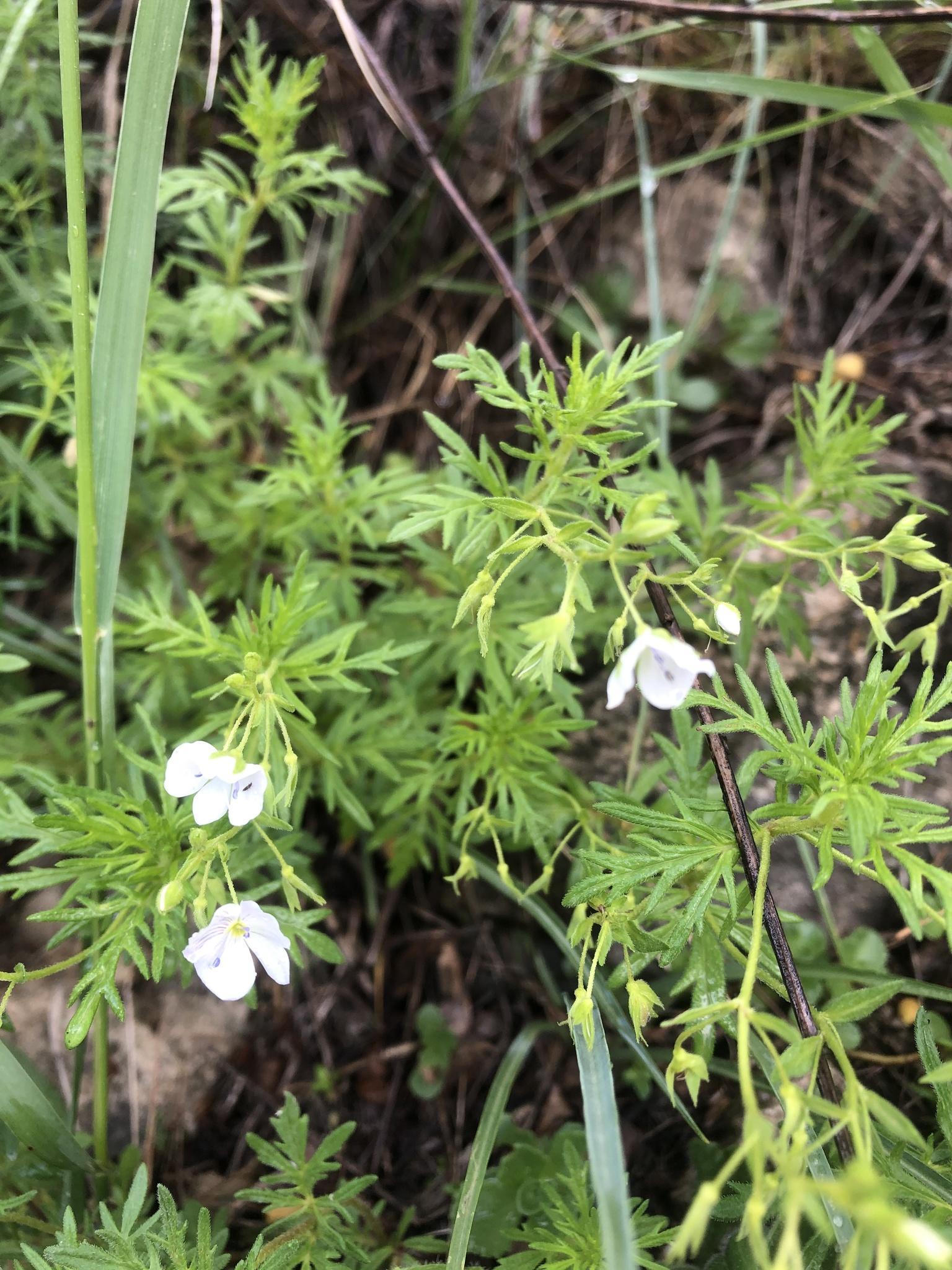

Scientific classification
- Kingdom: Plantae
- Clade: Embryophytes
- Clade: Tracheophytes
- Clade: Spermatophytes
- Clade: Angiosperms
- Clade: Eudicots
- Clade: Asterids
- Order: Lamiales
- Family: Plantaginaceae
- Genus: Veronica
- Species: V. caucasica

Binomial name
- Veronica caucasica M.Bieb.

= Veronica caucasica =

Species of flowering plant

Veronica caucasica is a flower in the family Plantaginaceae native to east of the Black Sea, grown further afield as a garden plant.

== Description ==
A perennial speedwell native to the east of the Black Sea also grown in gardens, with stems ascending to 30 cm; it has white flowers with purple veins that fade to pink at the centre (sometimes faint), and leaves very parted into many narrow divisions which may themselves divide, with margins curling under; it is hairy, sometimes very greatly. Its fruits are a hairy capsule, 4 × 6 mm.

Photographic examples can be seen on iNaturalist.

== Distribution ==
Its native range is North Caucasus and the Transcaucasus.
