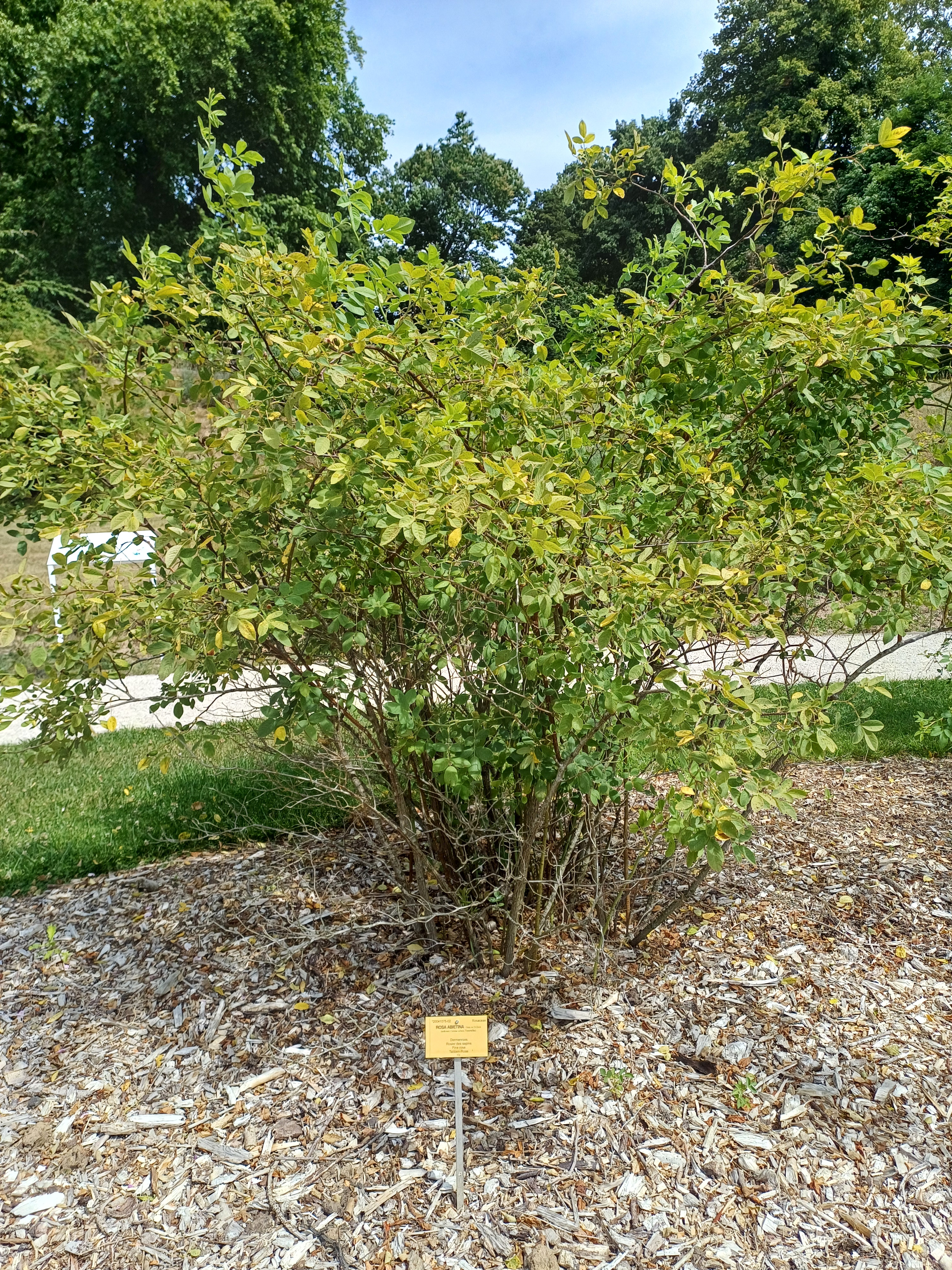

Scientific classification
- Kingdom: Plantae
- Clade: Tracheophytes
- Clade: Angiosperms
- Clade: Eudicots
- Clade: Rosids
- Order: Rosales
- Family: Rosaceae
- Genus: Rosa
- Species: R. abietina

Binomial name
- Rosa abietina Gren. ex Christ

Synonyms
- Rosa dematranea Lagger & Puget ex Cottet; Rosa favratii Christ; Rosa guentheri Wiesb.

= Rosa abietina =

Species of rose

Rosa abietina is a species of rose that was described by Jean Charles Marie Grenier. Rosa abietina is part of the genus Rosa and is an insect flower from the family Rosaceae.
