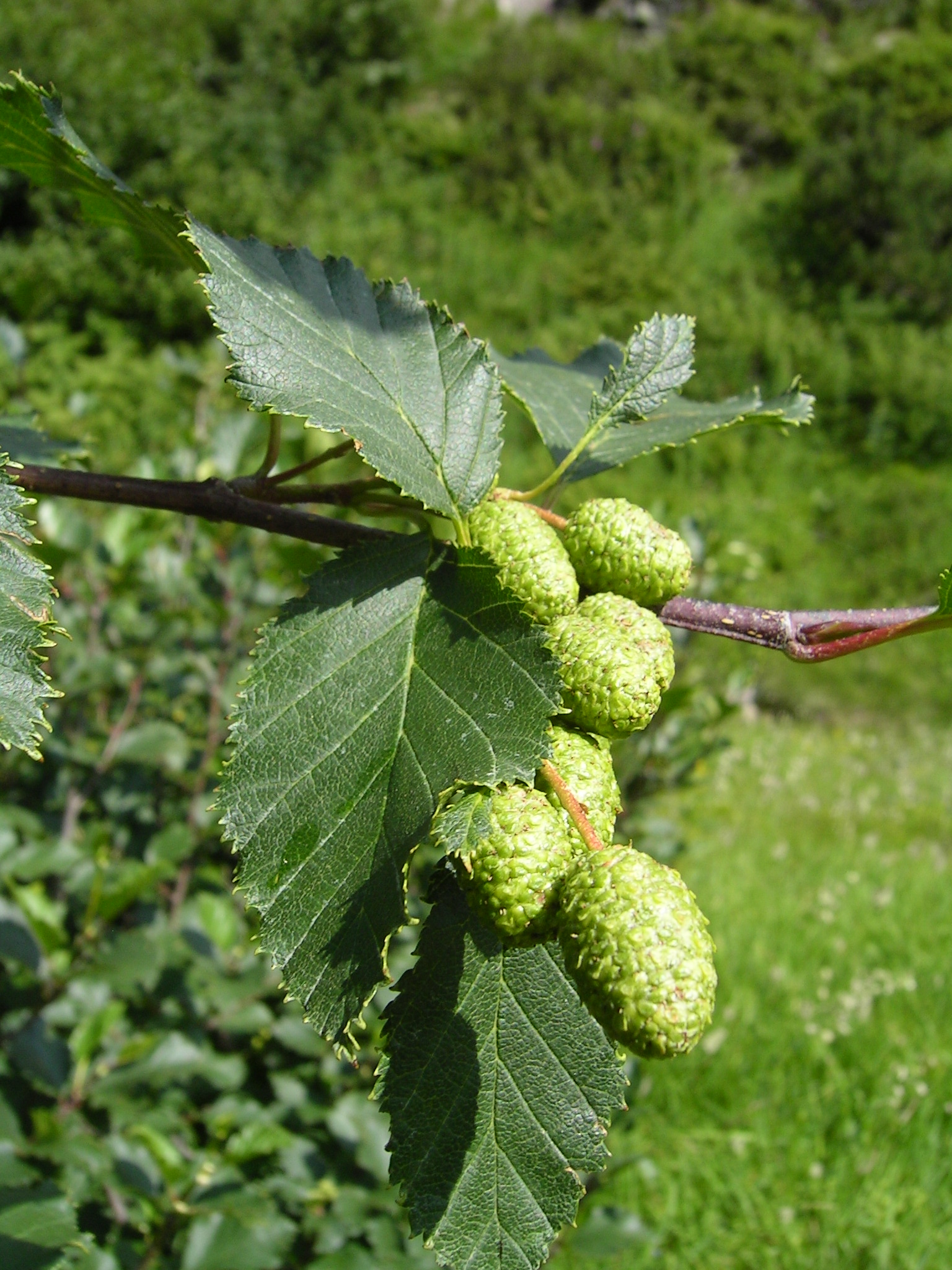
- Alnus alnobetula subsp. alnobetula in the Bernese Oberland, Switzerland

Conservation status
- Least Concern (IUCN 3.1)

Scientific classification
- Kingdom: Plantae
- Clade: Embryophytes
- Clade: Tracheophytes
- Clade: Angiosperms
- Clade: Eudicots
- Clade: Rosids
- Order: Fagales
- Family: Betulaceae
- Genus: Alnus
- Subgenus: Alnus subg. Clethropsis
- Species: A. alnobetula

Binomial name
- Alnus alnobetula (Ehrh.) K.Koch
- Natural distribution of Alnus alnobetula complex

Synonyms
- List: Betula alnobetula Ehrh. (basionym); Alnus fruticosa Rupr.; Alnus viridis (Chaix) DC. 1805; Alnus viridis A.Gray 1848, illegitimate homonym, not (Chaix) DC. 1805; Alnaster fruticosus (Rupr.) Ledeb.; Duschekia fruticosa (Rupr.) Pouzar; Alnus pumila Nois. ex Corrie; Alnus orbiculata Lopylaie ex Spach; Alnus tristis Wormsk. ex Regel; Alnus alpina Vill.; Betula viridis Chaix in D.Villars; Betula ovata Schrank; Betula alpina Borkh. ex Theorin; Alnus ovata (Schrank) G.Lodd.; Alnaster viridis (Chaix) Spach; Semidopsis viridis (Chaix) Zumagl.; Duschekia ovata (Schrank) Opiz; Duschekia viridis (Chaix) Opiz; Alnus brembana Rota; Alnus corylifolia A.Kern. ex Dalla Torre; Betula crispa Aiton; Alnus crispa (Aiton) Pursh; Alnaster crispus (Aiton) Czerep.; Duschekia crispa (Aiton) Pouzar; Alnus undulata Willd.; Betula alnus-crispa Steud.; Alnus mitchelliana M.A.Curtis ex A.Gray; Alnus repens Wormsk. ex Hornem.; Alnus mollis Fernald; Alnus viridis var. sinuata Regel; Alnus sinuata (Regel) Rydb.; Duschekia sinuata (Regel) Pouzar; Alnaster sinuatus (Regel) Czerep.; Betula tristis Wormsk. ex Link; Alnus sitchensis (Regel) Sarg; Alnus kamschatica (Regel) Kudô ex Masam; Duschekia kamtschatica (Callier) Pouzar; Alnaster kamtschaticus (Callier) Czerep.; Alnus suaveolens Req.

= Alnus alnobetula =

Species of tree

Alnus alnobetula, the green alder, is a common shrub or small tree widespread across much of Europe, Asia, and North America. Many sources refer to it as Alnus viridis but this is a later name, synonymous with Alnus alnobetula subsp. alnobetula. The species was first described by Jakob Friedrich Ehrhart in 1783 as Betula alnobetula, while the name viridis was first used later, as Betula viridis, in 1785.

== Description ==
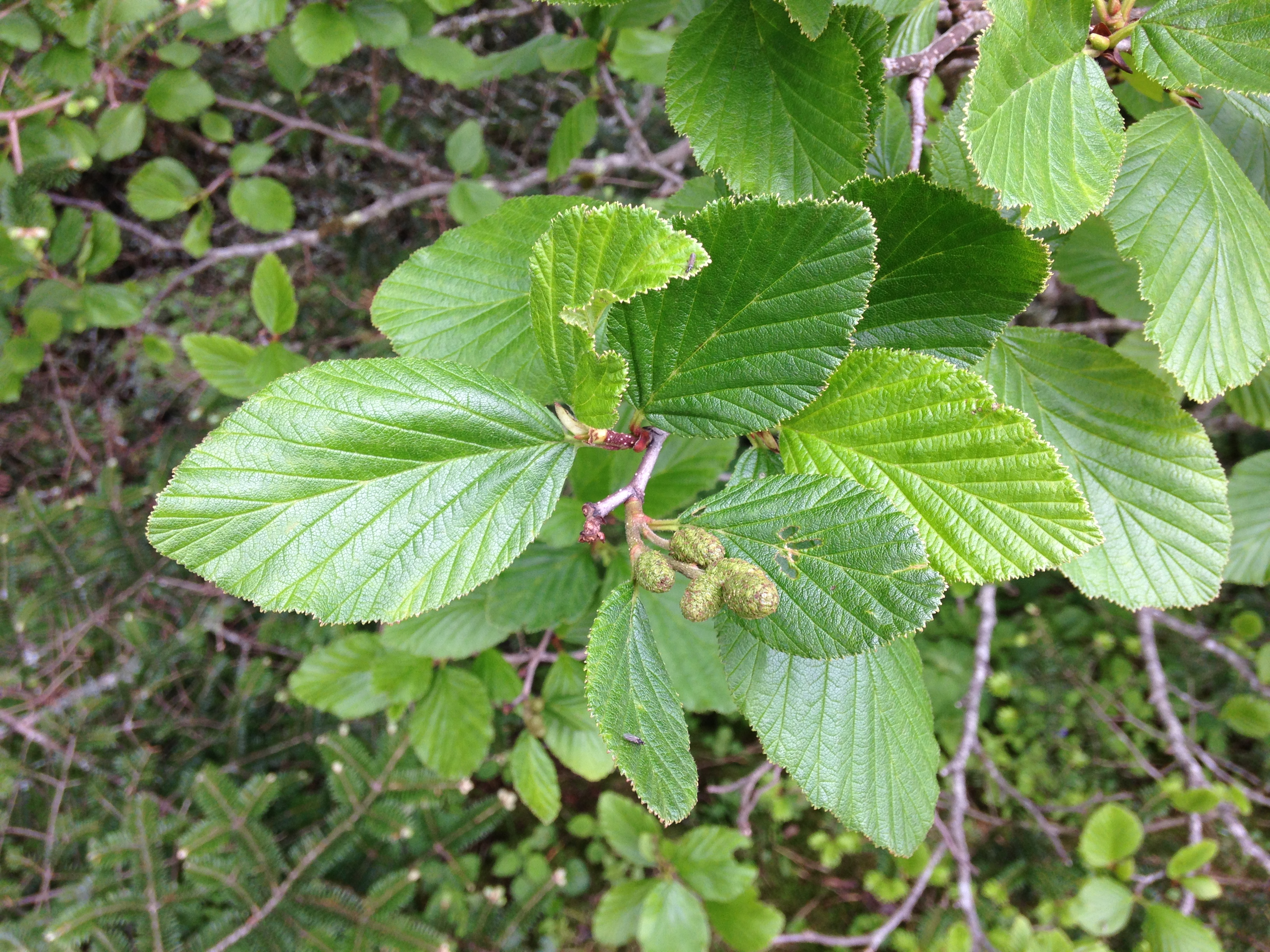
Foliage and inflorescence, subsp. crispa

It is a deciduous large shrub or small tree 3–12 metres (10–39 ft) tall with smooth grey bark even in old age. The leaves are shiny green with light green undersurfaces, ovoid, 3–8 centimetres (1.2–3.1 in) long and 2–6 cm (0.79–2.36 in) broad. The flowers are catkins, appearing late in spring after the leaves emerge (unlike other alders which flower before leafing out); the male catkins are pendulous, 4–8 cm long, the female catkins 1 cm long and 0.7 cm broad when mature in late autumn, in clusters of 3–10 on a branched stem. The seeds are small, 1–2 mm long, light brown with a narrow encircling wing.

The roots of green alder have nitrogen-fixing nodules. A study in Alaska showed that Sitka alder seedlings were able to invade coal mine spoils and can be used for revegetation and stripmine reclamation.

== Distribution ==
There are five to seven subspecies, some treated as separate species by some authors; the Plants of the World Online (POWO) database currently accepts five subspecies:

- Alnus alnobetula subsp. alnobetula – Central Europe (Alps, Carpathians, Balkan Mountains)
- Alnus alnobetula subsp. crispa (Aiton) Raus – northeastern North America, Greenland (mountain alder; syn. A. crispa)
- Alnus alnobetula subsp. fruticosa (Rupr.) Raus – Northeast Europe, northern Asia, northwestern North America
- Alnus alnobetula subsp. sinuata (Regel) Raus – western North America, far northeastern Siberia (Sitka alder; syn. A. sinuata)
- Alnus alnobetula subsp. suaveolens (Req.) Lambinon & Kerguélen – Corsica (endemic)

Two other subspecies sometimes accepted, subsp. mandschurica and subsp. maximowiczii, both from the far east of Asia, are now treated as separate species Alnus mandschurica and Alnus maximowiczii respectively, by POWO.

== Ecology ==
Alnus alnobetula has a shallow root system, and is marked not only by vigorous production of stump suckers, but also by root suckers.

It is a light-demanding, fast-growing shrub that grows well on poorer soils. In many areas, it is a highly characteristic colonist of avalanche chutes in mountains, where potentially competing larger trees are killed by regular avalanche damage. A. viridis survives the avalanches through its ability to re-grow from the roots and broken stumps. Unlike some other alders, it does require moist soil, and is a colonist of scree and shallow stony slopes. It also commonly grows on subarctic river gravels, particularly in northern Siberia, Alaska and Canada, occupying areas similarly disrupted by ice floes during spring river ice breakup; in this habitat it commonly occurs mixed with shrubby willows.

The species is classed as an environmental weed in New Zealand.

== Uses ==
Green alder is sometimes used for afforestation on infertile soils which it enriches by means of its nitrogen-fixing nodules, while not growing large enough to compete with the intended timber crop. It can add 50kg of nitrogen per hectare (20 kg per acre) per year to the soil. The leaves have been used in the traditional Austrian medicine externally or internally as tea for treatment of infections and fever.
