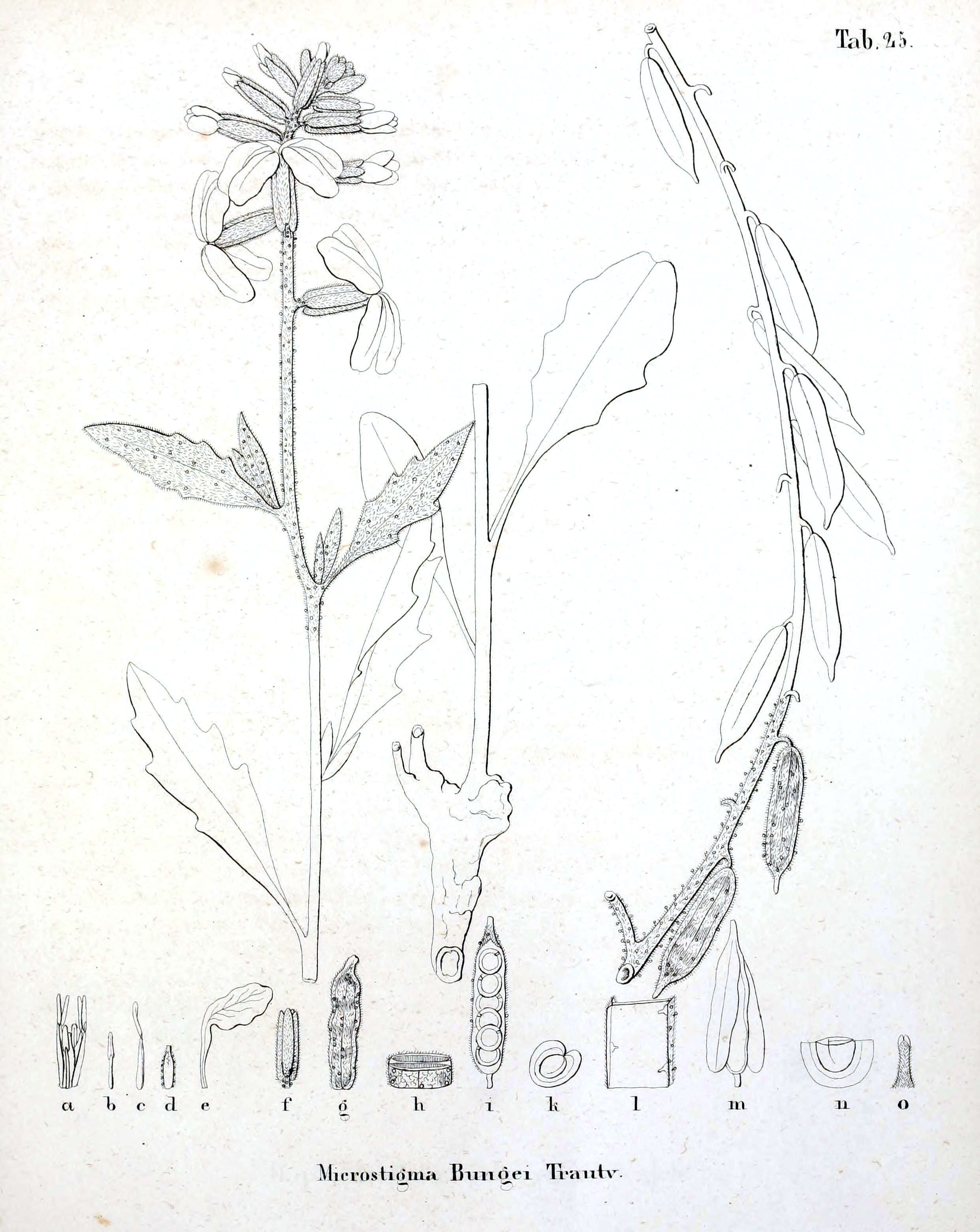
- Microstigma deflexum

Scientific classification
- Kingdom: Plantae
- Clade: Tracheophytes
- Clade: Angiosperms
- Clade: Eudicots
- Clade: Rosids
- Order: Brassicales
- Family: Brassicaceae
- Subfamily: Brassicoideae
- Tribe: Anchonieae
- Genus: Microstigma; Trautv.

= Microstigma (plant) =

Genus of flowering plants

Microstigma is a genus of flowering plants in the family Brassicaceae. It includes four species native to temperate Asia, ranging from central Siberia to northern China.

== Species ==
Four species are accepted.

- Microstigma brachycarpum Botsch.
- Microstigma deflexum (Bunge) Juz.
- Microstigma junatovii Grubov
- Microstigma sajanense Kuvaev & Sonnikova
