= Snowball bush =

Snowball bush is a common name for several ornamental plants which produce large clusters of white flowers and may refer to:

- Species of Hydrangea, which tend to flower in the summer:
  - Hydrangea arborescens
  - Hydrangea paniculata
- Species of Viburnum, which tend to flower in the spring:
  - Viburnum macrocephalum (Chinese snowball bush)
  - Viburnum opulus (European snowball bush)
  - Viburnum plicatum (Japanese snowball bush)
  - Viburnum carlcephalum (Fragrant Snowball)
