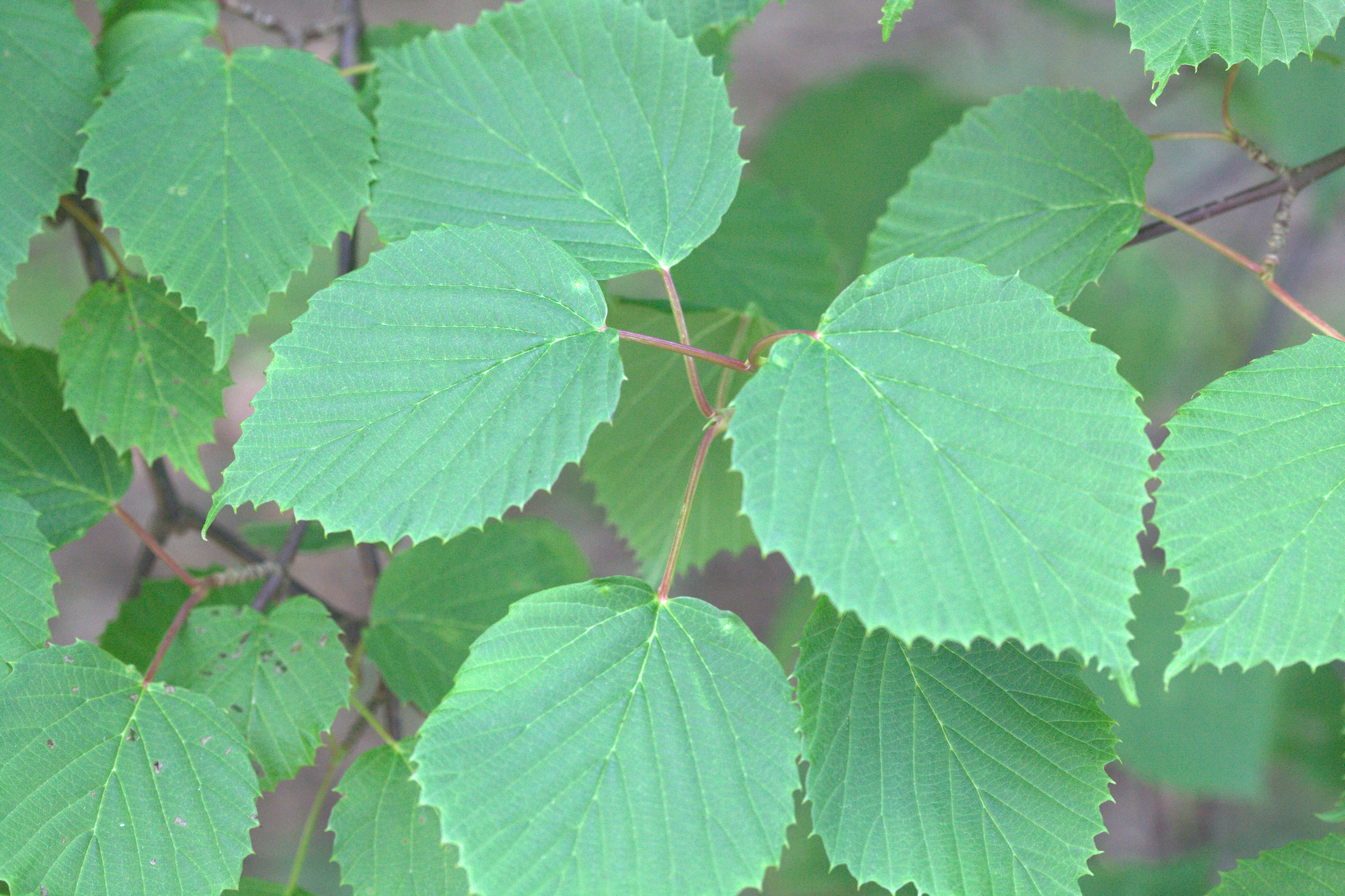
- Leaves
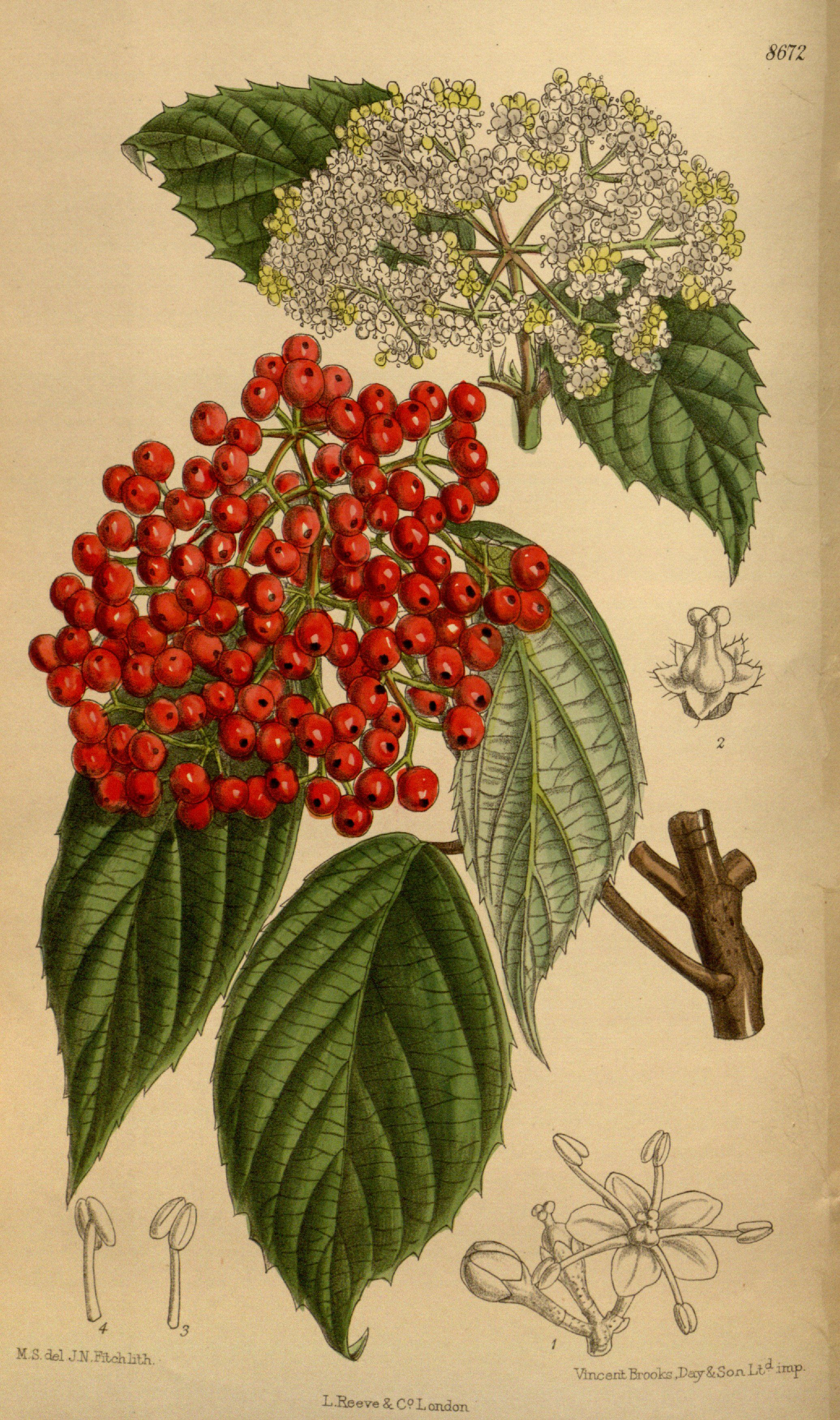
- Botanical illustration

Scientific classification
- Kingdom: Plantae
- Clade: Embryophytes
- Clade: Tracheophytes
- Clade: Spermatophytes
- Clade: Angiosperms
- Clade: Eudicots
- Clade: Asterids
- Order: Dipsacales
- Family: Viburnaceae
- Genus: Viburnum
- Species: V. betulifolium

Binomial name
- Viburnum betulifolium Batalin

Synonyms
- List: Viburnum adenophorum W.W.Sm.; Viburnum betulifolium var. flocculosum (Rehder) P.S.Hsu; Viburnum dasyanthum Rehder; Viburnum flavescens W.W.Sm.; Viburnum hupehense Rehder; Viburnum lobophyllum Graebn.; Viburnum luzonicum var. morrisonense (Hayata) S.S.Ying; Viburnum morrisonense Hayata; Viburnum ovatifolium Rehder; Viburnum taihasense Hayata; Viburnum wilsonii Rehder

= Viburnum betulifolium =

Species of flowering plant

Viburnum betulifolium, the birchleaf viburnum, is a species of flowering plant in the family Viburnaceae, native to China and the island of Taiwan. Shade tolerant, it is often dominant in the shrub layer of the forests in which it occurs. Widely cultivated outside of China, it has attractive bronze to burgundy Autumn foliage, and the masses of bright red berries are attractive to birds. It is hardy to USDA zone 4.

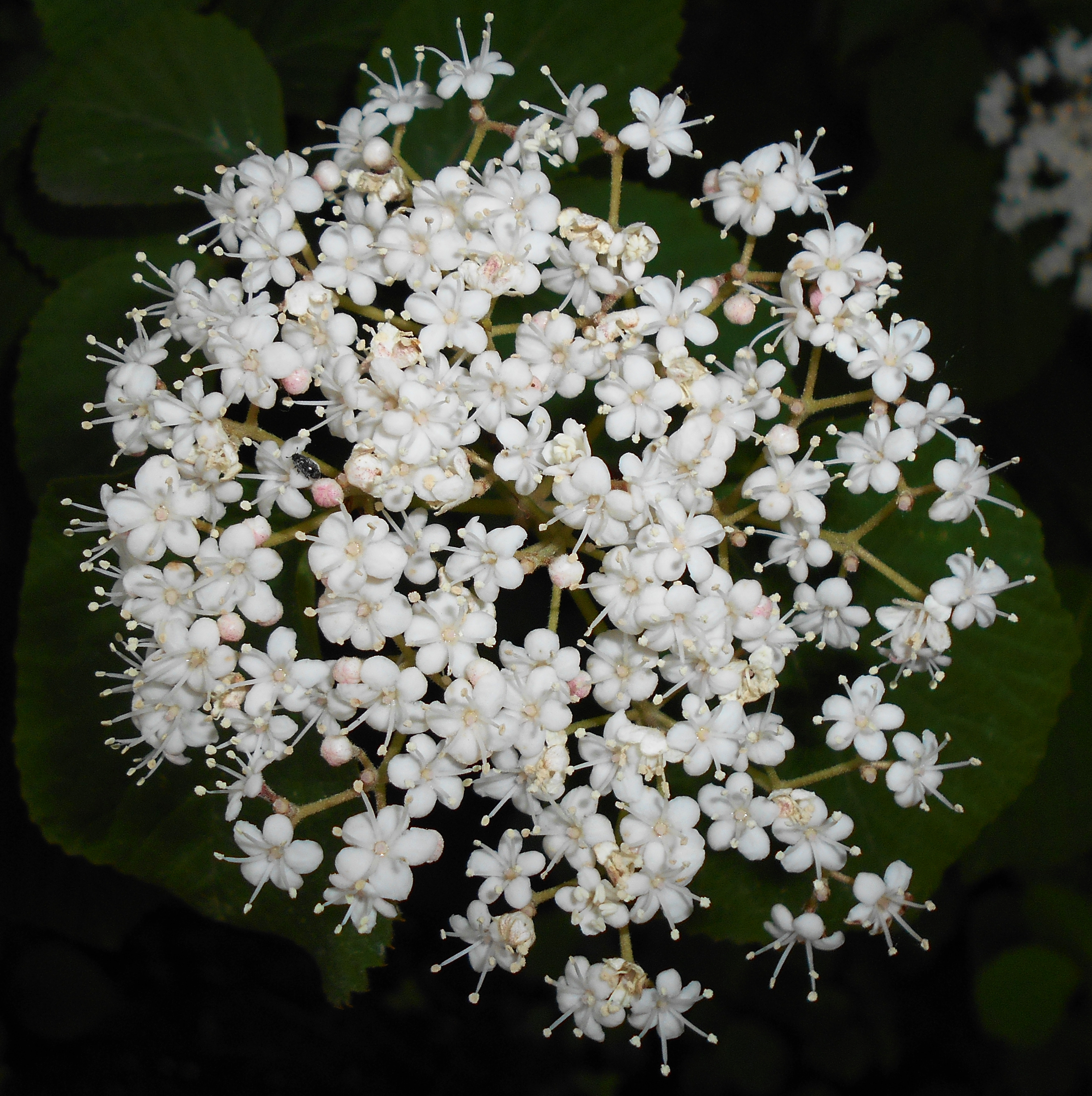
Flowers

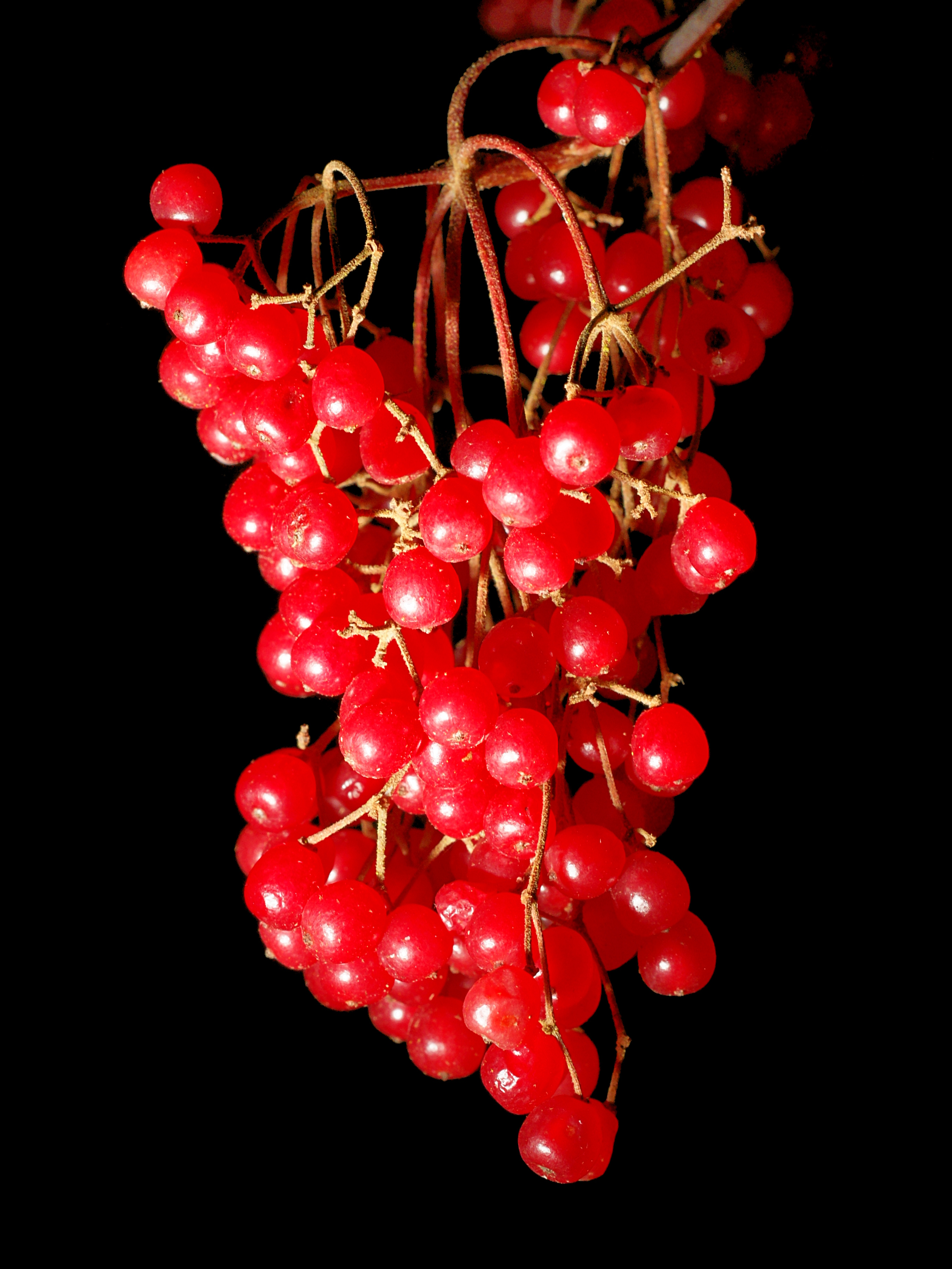
Fruit
