= Viburnum molinae =

Conservation status
- Critically Endangered (IUCN 3.1)

Scientific classification
- Kingdom: Plantae
- Clade: Embryophytes
- Clade: Tracheophytes
- Clade: Spermatophytes
- Clade: Angiosperms
- Clade: Eudicots
- Clade: Asterids
- Order: Dipsacales
- Family: Viburnaceae
- Genus: Viburnum
- Species: V. molinae

Binomial name
- Viburnum molinae Lundell

Species of flowering plant

Viburnum molinae is a species of plant in the family Viburnaceae. It is endemic to Honduras.
