= Viburnum hondurense =

Conservation status
- Critically Endangered (IUCN 2.3)

Scientific classification
- Kingdom: Plantae
- Clade: Embryophytes
- Clade: Tracheophytes
- Clade: Spermatophytes
- Clade: Angiosperms
- Clade: Eudicots
- Clade: Asterids
- Order: Dipsacales
- Family: Viburnaceae
- Genus: Viburnum
- Species: V. hondurense

Binomial name
- Viburnum hondurense Standl.

Species of flowering plant

Viburnum hondurense is a species of plant in the family Viburnaceae. It is endemic to Honduras.
