= Viburnum tridentatum =

Conservation status
- Vulnerable (IUCN 2.3)

Scientific classification
- Kingdom: Plantae
- Clade: Embryophytes
- Clade: Tracheophytes
- Clade: Spermatophytes
- Clade: Angiosperms
- Clade: Eudicots
- Clade: Asterids
- Order: Dipsacales
- Family: Viburnaceae
- Genus: Viburnum
- Species: V. tridentatum

Binomial name
- Viburnum tridentatum Killip & Smith

Species of plant

Viburnum tridentatum is a species of plant in the family Viburnaceae. It is endemic to Peru.
