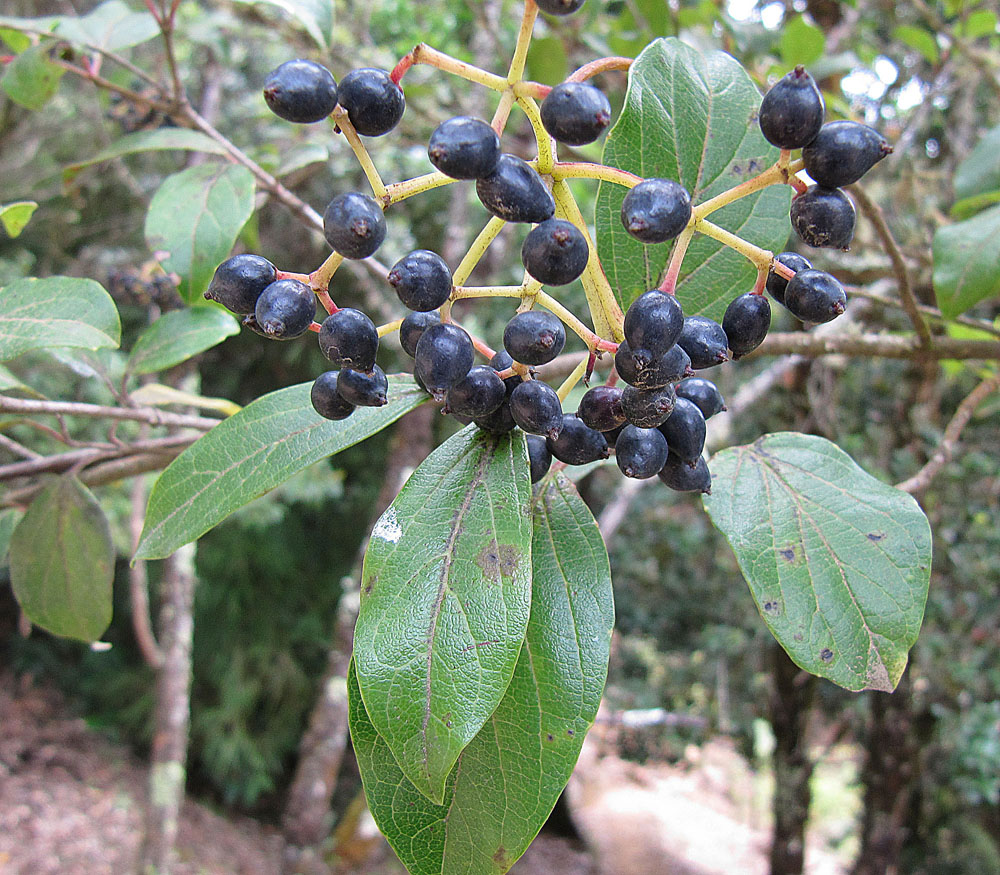

Conservation status
- Near Threatened (IUCN 2.3)

Scientific classification
- Kingdom: Plantae
- Clade: Embryophytes
- Clade: Tracheophytes
- Clade: Spermatophytes
- Clade: Angiosperms
- Clade: Eudicots
- Clade: Asterids
- Order: Dipsacales
- Family: Viburnaceae
- Genus: Viburnum
- Species: V. costaricanum

Binomial name
- Viburnum costaricanum (Oerst.) Hemsl.

= Viburnum costaricanum =

Species of flowering plant

Viburnum costaricanum is a species of plant in the family Viburnaceae. It is found in Costa Rica and Panama. It is threatened by habitat loss.
