= Viburnum mortonianum =

Conservation status
- Data Deficient (IUCN 2.3)

Scientific classification
- Kingdom: Plantae
- Clade: Embryophytes
- Clade: Tracheophytes
- Clade: Spermatophytes
- Clade: Angiosperms
- Clade: Eudicots
- Clade: Asterids
- Order: Dipsacales
- Family: Viburnaceae
- Genus: Viburnum
- Species: V. mortonianum

Binomial name
- Viburnum mortonianum Standl. & Steyerm.

Species of flowering plant

Viburnum mortonianum is a species of plant in the family Viburnaceae. It is found in El Salvador and Guatemala.
