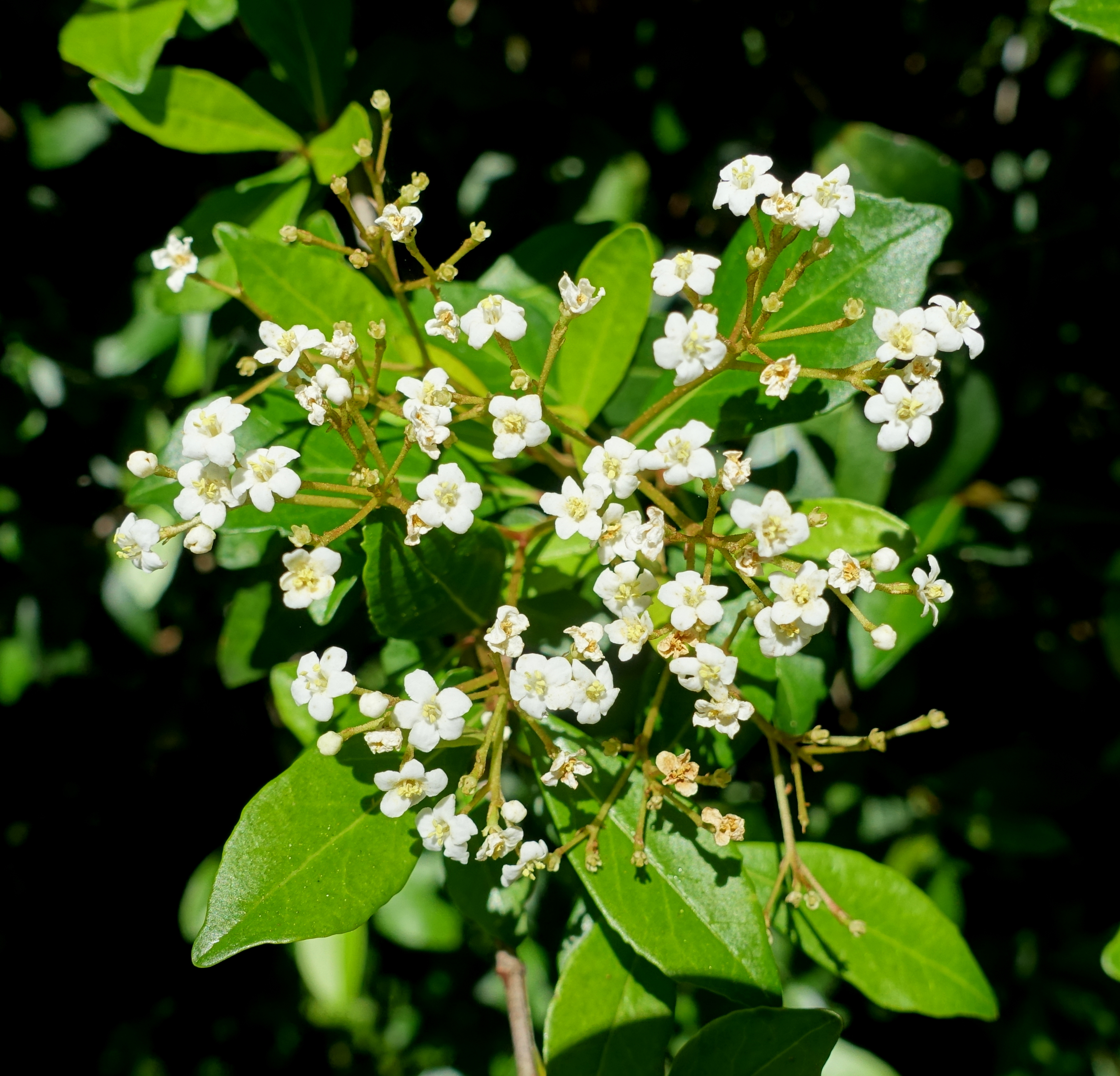

Conservation status
- Secure (NatureServe)

Scientific classification
- Kingdom: Plantae
- Clade: Tracheophytes
- Clade: Angiosperms
- Clade: Eudicots
- Clade: Asterids
- Order: Dipsacales
- Family: Viburnaceae
- Genus: Viburnum
- Species: V. obovatum

Binomial name
- Viburnum obovatum Walter
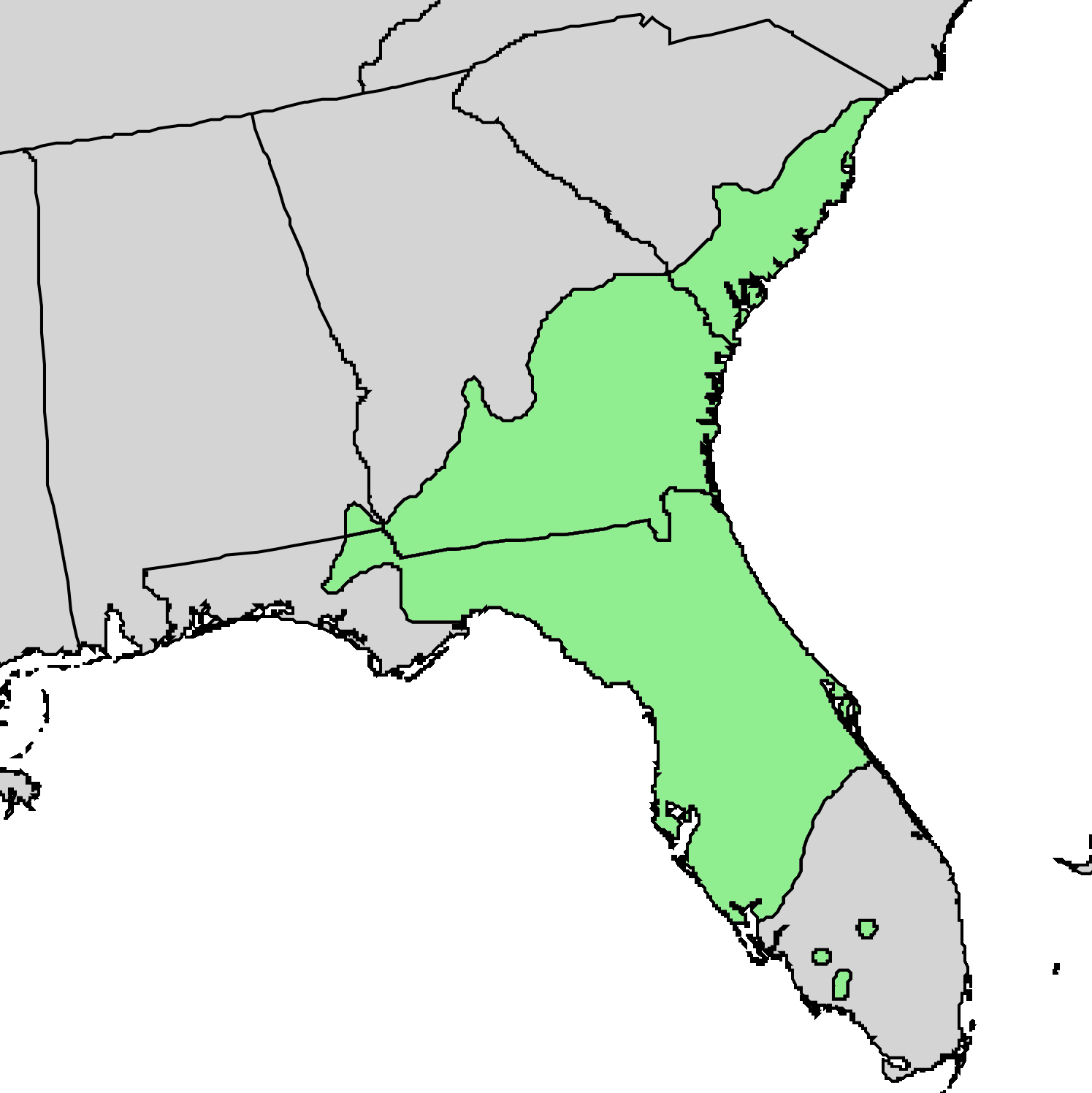

= Viburnum obovatum =

Species of flowering plant

Viburnum obovatum, the small-leaf viburnum or Walter's virburnum is an evergreen to semi-evergreen shrub or small tree Viburnum within the family Viburnaceae. It is native to the southeastern United States where it inhabits woodlands, along stream banks, and in moist hammocks. The species typically grows 10–20 feet (3–6 m) tall and wide, with small, glossy, oval leaves, white spring flowers borne in cymes, and blue-black drupes that provide food for birds and other wildlife. Viburnum obovatum is widely used in landscaping for privacy hedges and screens as it is tolerant of pruning, allowing it to be maintained as a dense shrub or trained into a small tree form.
