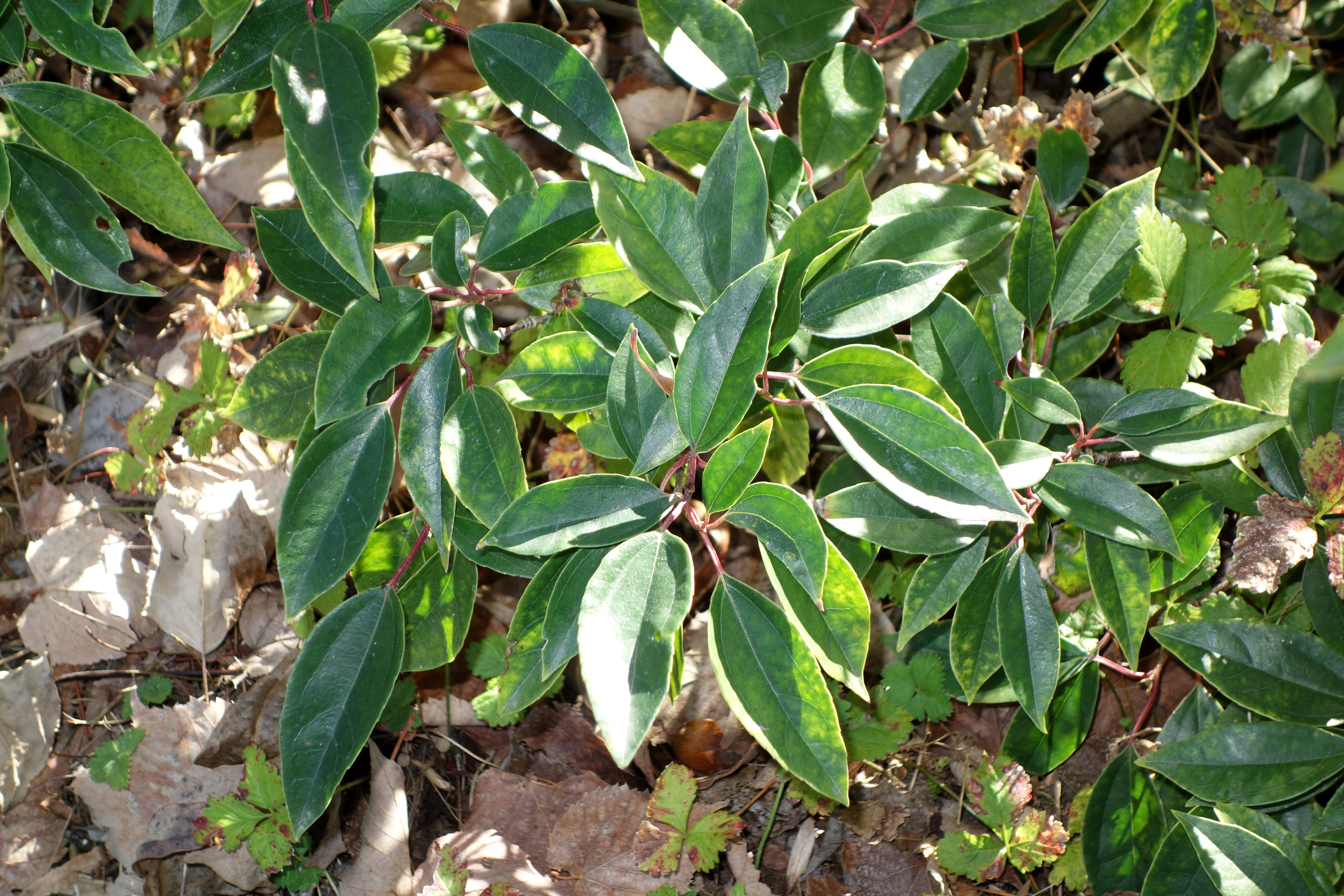
- At the Sonoma Botanical Garden

Scientific classification
- Kingdom: Plantae
- Clade: Tracheophytes
- Clade: Angiosperms
- Clade: Eudicots
- Clade: Asterids
- Order: Dipsacales
- Family: Adoxaceae
- Genus: Viburnum
- Species: V. propinquum

Binomial name
- Viburnum propinquum Hemsl.

= Viburnum propinquum =

Species of flowering plant

Viburnum propinquum, the Chinese evergreen viburnum, is a species of flowering plant in the family Viburnaceae, native to central and southern China, Taiwan, and Luzon in the Philippines. A dense, rounded evergreen bush reaching 6–8 ft (1.8–2.4 m), and useful for landscaping applications, it is hardy to USDA zone 7.
