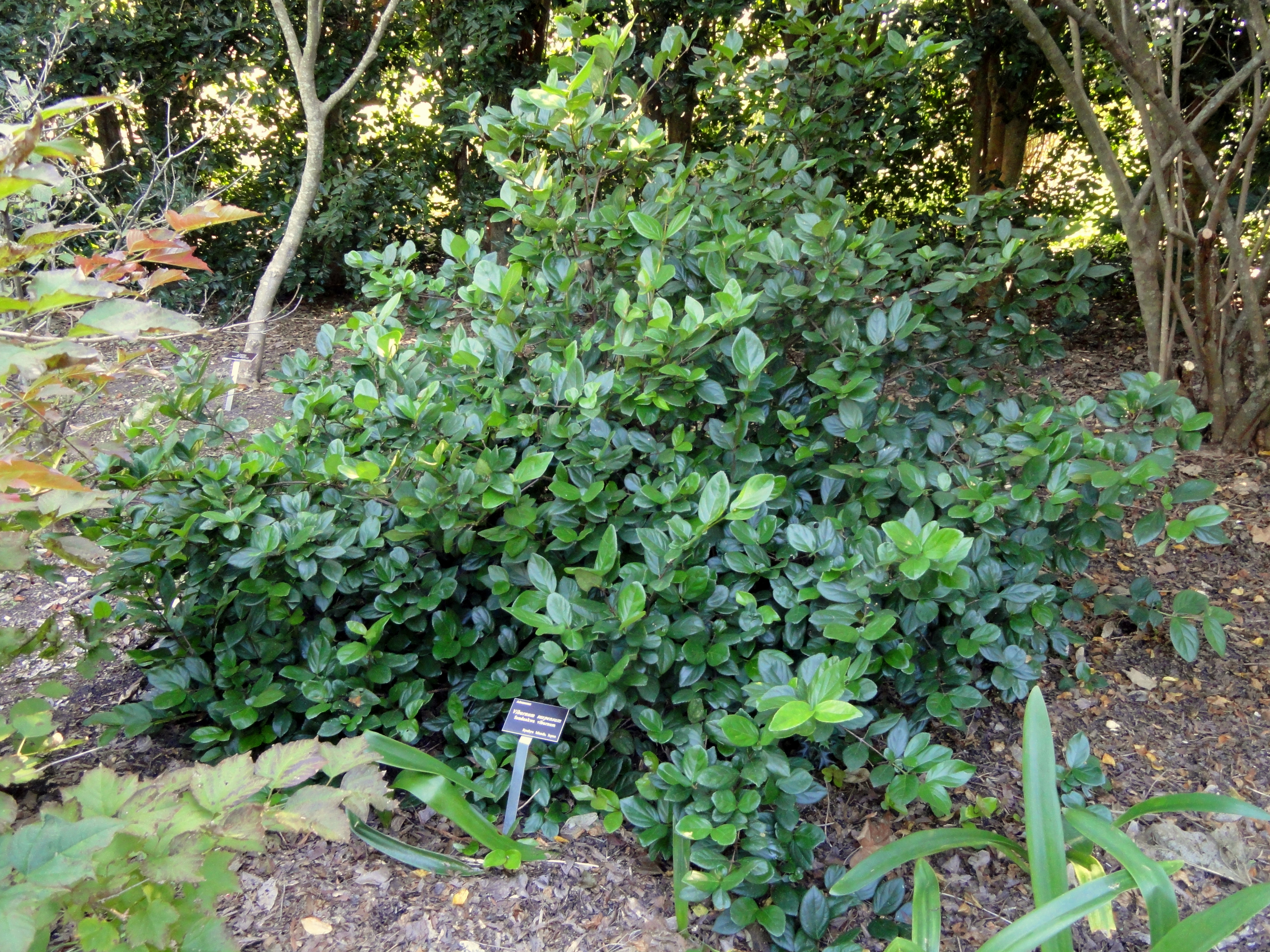

Scientific classification
- Kingdom: Plantae
- Clade: Tracheophytes
- Clade: Angiosperms
- Clade: Eudicots
- Clade: Asterids
- Order: Dipsacales
- Family: Adoxaceae
- Genus: Viburnum
- Species: V. suspensum

Binomial name
- Viburnum suspensum Lindl.

= Viburnum suspensum =

Species of shrub

Viburnum suspensum, commonly called Sandankwa viburnum, is a compact, perennial shrub, native to Japan. It grows up to 3.7 m in height.

The coarse leaves are dark green and densely cover the shrub. They are oval with serrated edges about 3.5 inches (8.9 cm) long and 2 inches (5 cm) wide and are held oppositely on rough textured, dark brown stems.

Small tubular flowers are borne on the ends of new branches in the spring, and sporadically appear in the summer. They are white to pale pink, followed by small red berries in the fall that attract wildlife.
