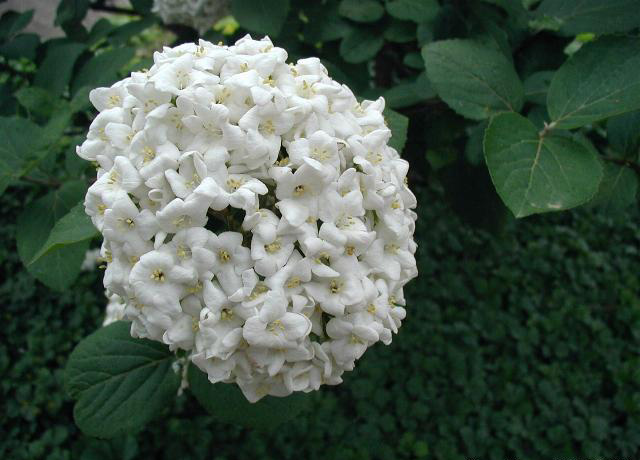

Scientific classification
- Kingdom: Plantae
- Clade: Tracheophytes
- Clade: Angiosperms
- Clade: Eudicots
- Clade: Asterids
- Order: Dipsacales
- Family: Viburnaceae
- Genus: Viburnum
- Species: V. × carlcephalum

Binomial name
- Viburnum × carlcephalum Burk. ex R.B.Pike

= Viburnum × carlcephalum =

Species of flowering plant

Viburnum × carlcephalum, common name fragrant snowball, is a hybrid flowering plant in the family Adoxaceae (formerly Caprifoliaceae), of garden origin. It is a cross between V. carlesii and V. macrocephalum.

Growing to 3 m (10 ft) tall and broad, it is a substantial deciduous shrub with heart-shaped leaves often turning red in autumn. Rounded flower-heads composed of many fragrant, tubular white flowers are borne in early summer. Flowering is later than many other deciduous viburnums. The flowers are followed in autumn by insignificant red-black fruits.

This plant has gained the Royal Horticultural Society's Award of Garden Merit.
