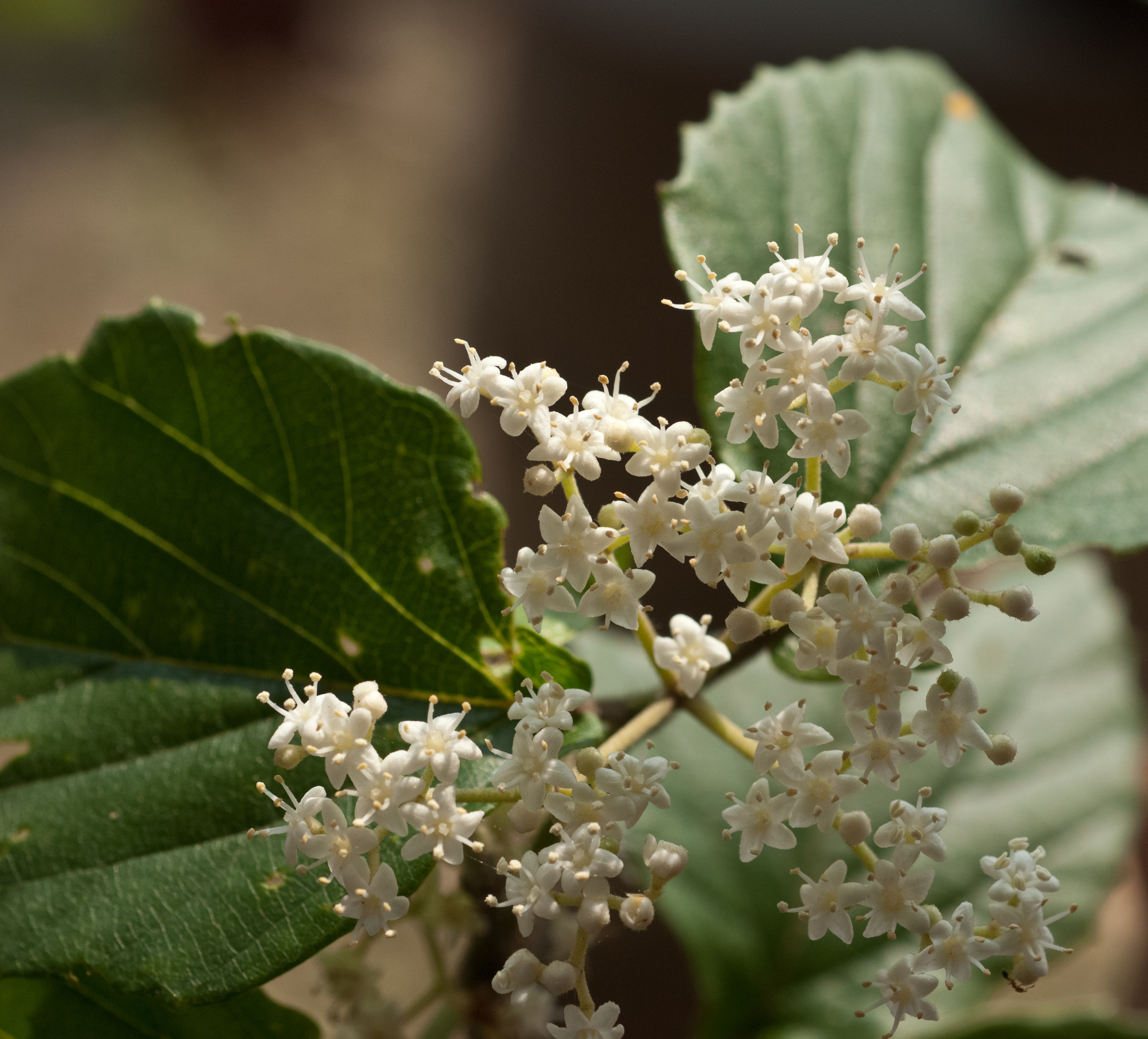
- Close-up of flowers

Scientific classification
- Kingdom: Plantae
- Clade: Tracheophytes
- Clade: Angiosperms
- Clade: Eudicots
- Clade: Asterids
- Order: Dipsacales
- Family: Adoxaceae
- Genus: Viburnum
- Species: V. luzonicum

Binomial name
- Viburnum luzonicum Rolfe

= Viburnum luzonicum =

Species of flowering plant

Viburnum luzonicum, the Luzon viburnum, is a species of flowering plant in the family Viburnaceae. It is native to southeast and south-central China, Taiwan, the Philippines, Vietnam, and the Maluku Islands. A dense, rounded evergreen bush reaching 8–15 ft (2.4–4.6 m), and taking readily to pruning into hedges, it is hardy to USDA zone 7.
