= Viburnum scabrellum =

Scientific classification
- Kingdom: Plantae
- Clade: Tracheophytes
- Clade: Angiosperms
- Clade: Eudicots
- Clade: Asterids
- Order: Dipsacales
- Family: Adoxaceae
- Genus: Viburnum
- Species: V. scabrellum

Binomial name
- Viburnum scabrellum (Torr. & A.Gray) Chapm.

Synonyms
- Viburnum dentatum var. scabrellum Torr. & A.Gray; Viburnum scabrellum var. dilutum McAtee

Species of plant

Viburnum scabrellum, the southern toothed viburnum, is a species of flowering plant in the family Viburnaceae, native to the central and southeastern United States. It is a deciduous shrub reaching 9 ft (2.7 m) that prefers to grow in wet areas.
