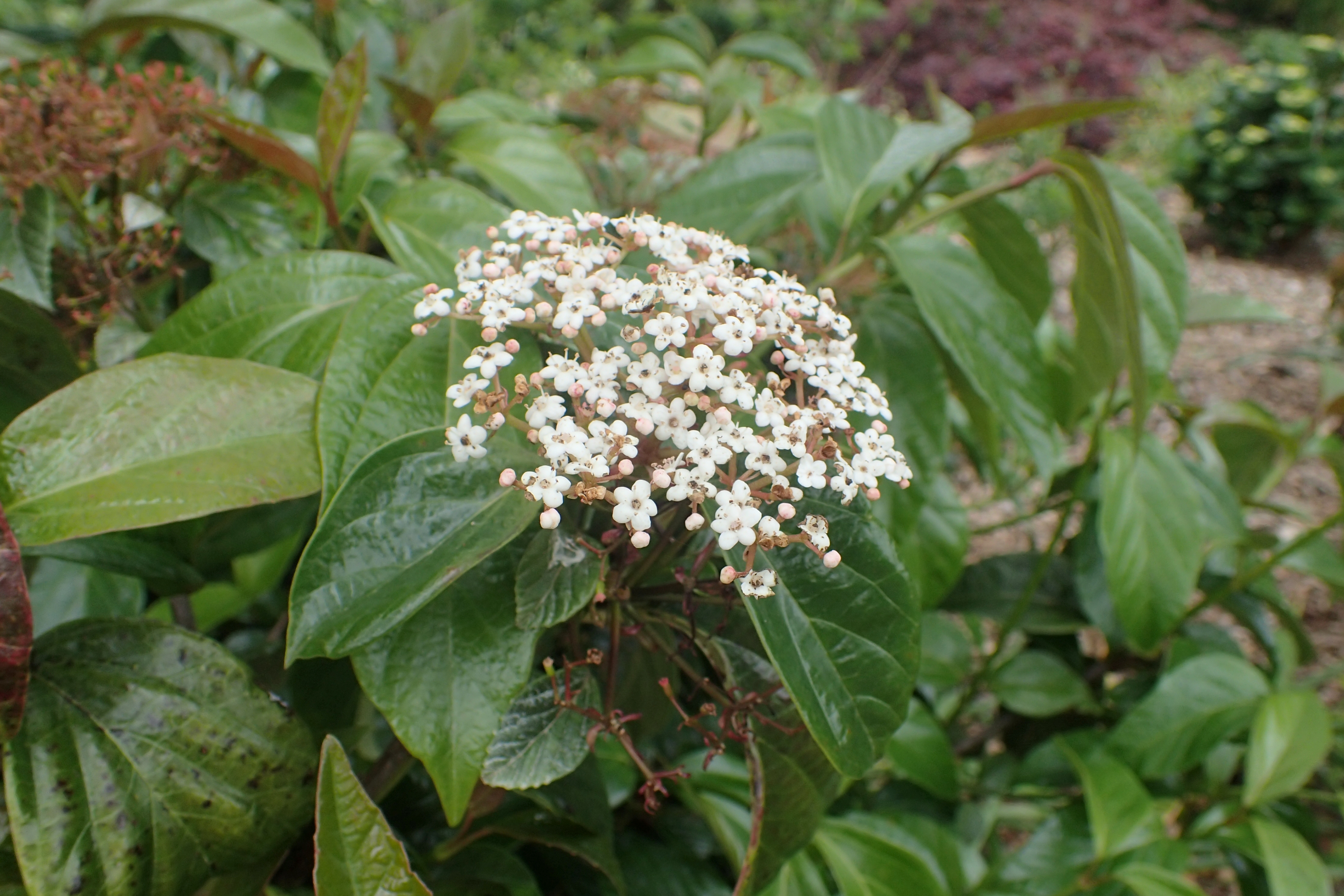
- At the Auckland Botanic Gardens

Scientific classification
- Kingdom: Plantae
- Clade: Tracheophytes
- Clade: Angiosperms
- Clade: Eudicots
- Clade: Asterids
- Order: Dipsacales
- Family: Adoxaceae
- Genus: Viburnum
- Species: V. japonicum

Binomial name
- Viburnum japonicum (Thunb.) Spreng.

Synonyms
- Viburnum fusiforme Nakai

= Viburnum japonicum =

Species of flowering plant

Viburnum japonicum, the Japanese viburnum, is a species of flowering plant in the family Viburnaceae. It native to Zhejiang in China, Gageodo island in South Korea, the Ryukyu Islands, and Japan. A rounded evergreen bush reaching 6–8 ft (1.8–2.4 m), with glossy leaves and strongly scented flowers, it is hardy to USDA zone 7.
