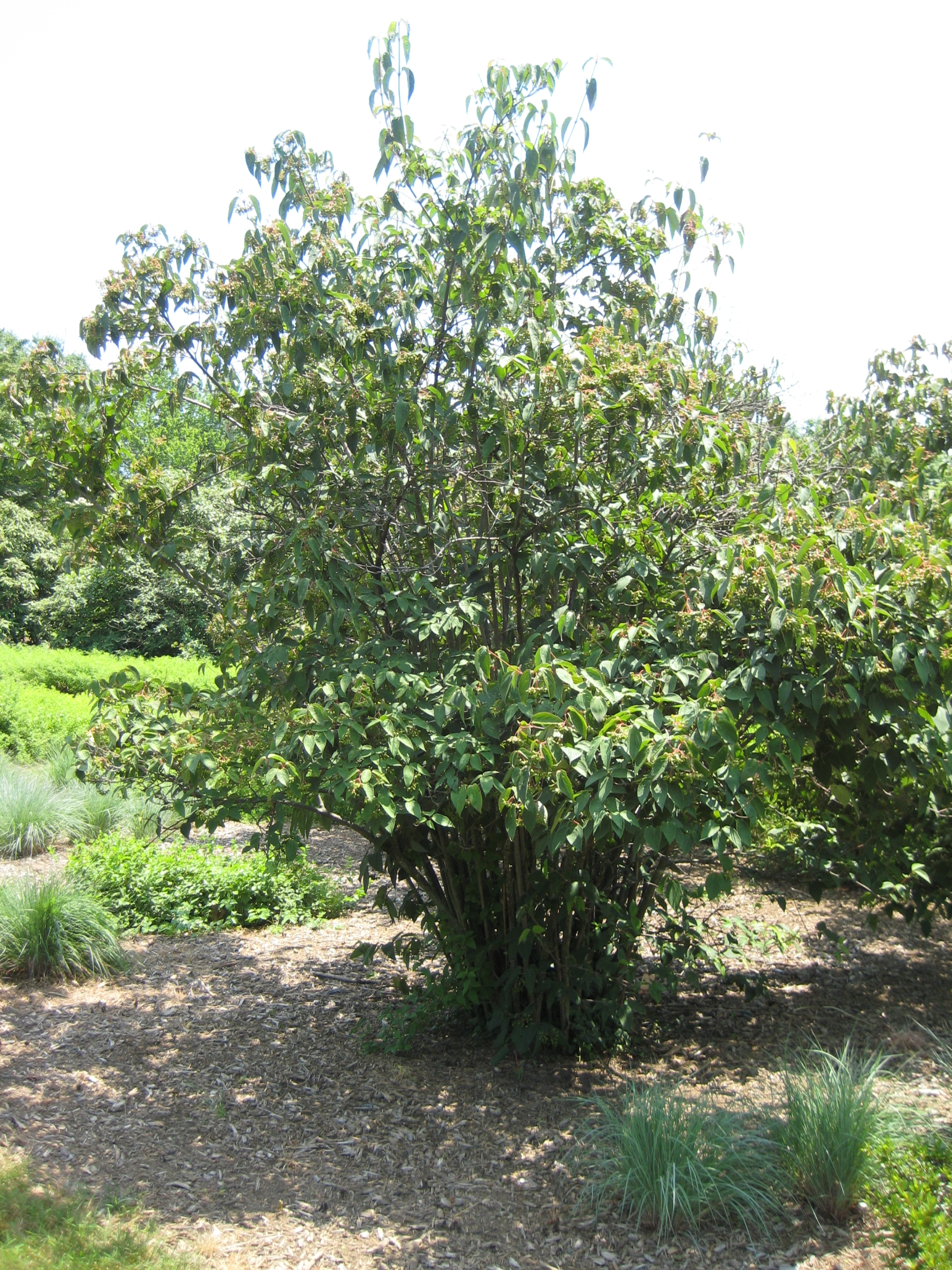
- mature shrub

Scientific classification
- Kingdom: Plantae
- Clade: Embryophytes
- Clade: Tracheophytes
- Clade: Spermatophytes
- Clade: Angiosperms
- Clade: Eudicots
- Clade: Asterids
- Order: Dipsacales
- Family: Viburnaceae
- Genus: Viburnum
- Species: V. setigerum

Binomial name
- Viburnum setigerum Hance

= Viburnum setigerum =

Species of flowering plant

Viburnum setigerum, the tea viburnum, is a plant in the family Viburnaceae that is native to China.

== Description ==
Viburnum setigerum is a shrub with opposite, simple leaves, and flexible, arching stems. The flowers are white, borne in spring. Drupes ripen to red in the fall.
