= Viburnum koreanum =

Scientific classification
- Kingdom: Plantae
- Clade: Tracheophytes
- Clade: Angiosperms
- Clade: Eudicots
- Clade: Asterids
- Order: Dipsacales
- Family: Viburnaceae
- Genus: Viburnum
- Species: V. koreanum

Binomial name
- Viburnum koreanum Nakai

Species of flowering plant

Viburnum koreanum, commonly known as the Korean viburnum, is a species of flowering plant in the family Viburnaceae. It is a shrub with papery leaves, white flowers, and yellow to dark red fruits. The species is native to east Asia, and was described in 1921.

== Taxonomy ==
The species was described by Takenoshin Nakai in 1921.

== Distribution ==
Viburnum koreanum is native to the temperate biome of China (Jilin), Korea, and Japan (Hokkaido). It grows in needle-leaved forests and at forest edges, and is found at elevations of around 1,400 metres (4,600 ft).

== Description ==
Viburnum koreanum is a deciduous shrub that grows up to 2 metres (6.6 ft) tall. The bark is light brown. The leaves are arranged oppositely. The leaf stems are 0.5–2 centimetres (0.20–0.79 in) long. The leaves are suborbicular or broadly ovate, papery, 3–13 centimetres (1.2–5.1 in) long, and 2–10 centimetres (0.79–3.94 in) wide. The edges are irregulary toothed.

The inflorescence is an umbel-like cyme. The stem is 1.5–4 centimetres (0.59–1.57 in) long. The calyx is an obconical green tube around 1 millimetre (0.039 in) long. It has lobes around 0.6 millimetres (0.024 in) long. The corolla is a white tube measuring 6–8 millimetres (0.24–0.31 in) wide, and around 1.2 millimetres (0.047 in) long. The corolla lobes are 2.5–3 millimetres (0.098–0.118 in) long, spreading, and ovate to elliptical. The plant flowers in June and July.

The fruits are yellow to dark red when mature, subellipsoid, 7–11 millimetres (0.28–0.43 in) long, and 5–7 millimetres (0.20–0.28 in) wide. The stone is ovoid-oblong, around 7 millimetres (0.28 in) long, and around 5.5 millimetres (0.22 in) wide. The plant flowers in August and September.

== Nomenclature ==
In English, Viburnum koreanum is commonly known as the "Korean viburnum". In Korean, it is known as 배암나무 (baeamnamu). In Chinese, it is known as 朝鲜荚蒾 (chao xian jia mi).
