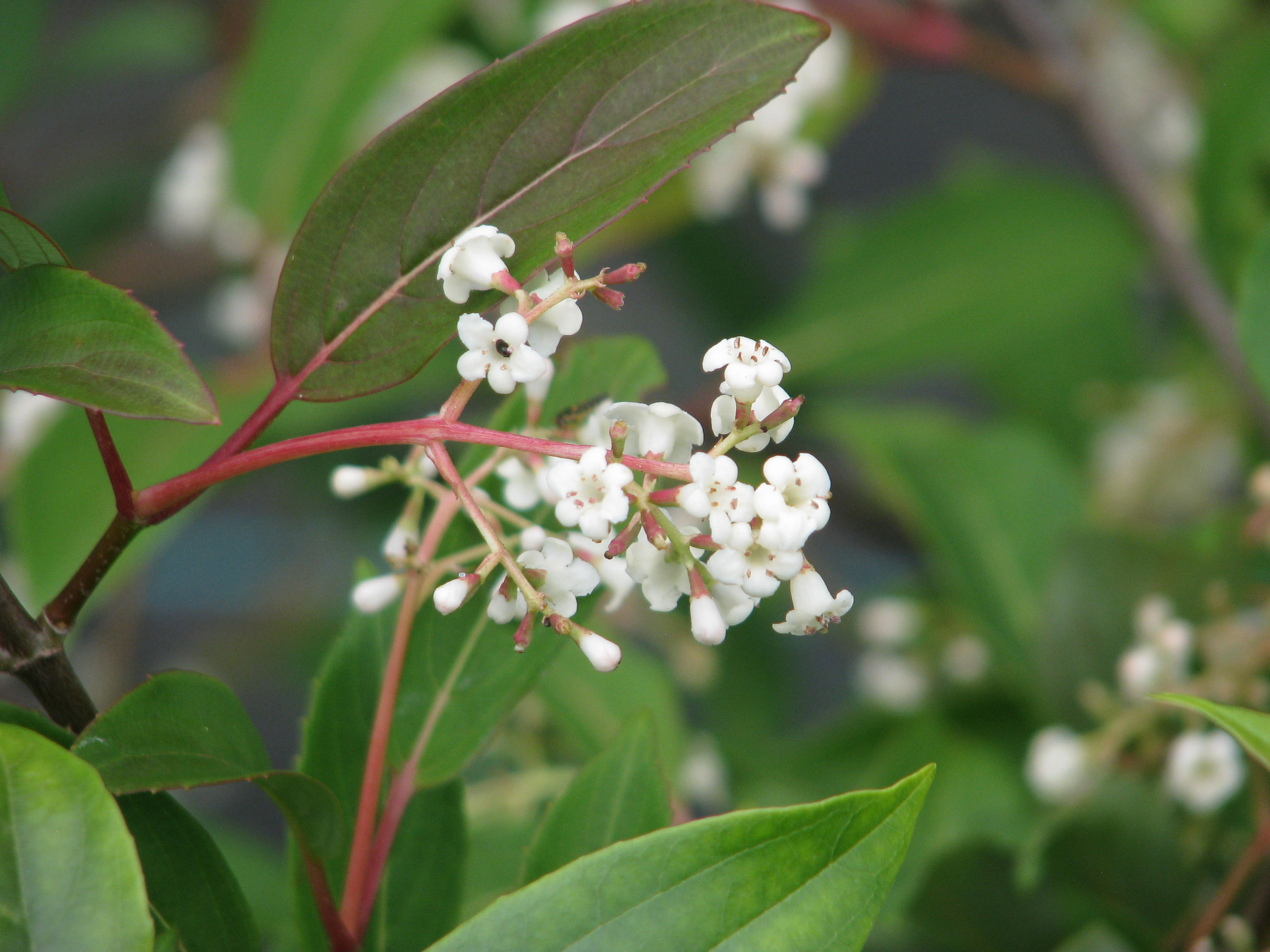
- Inflorescence
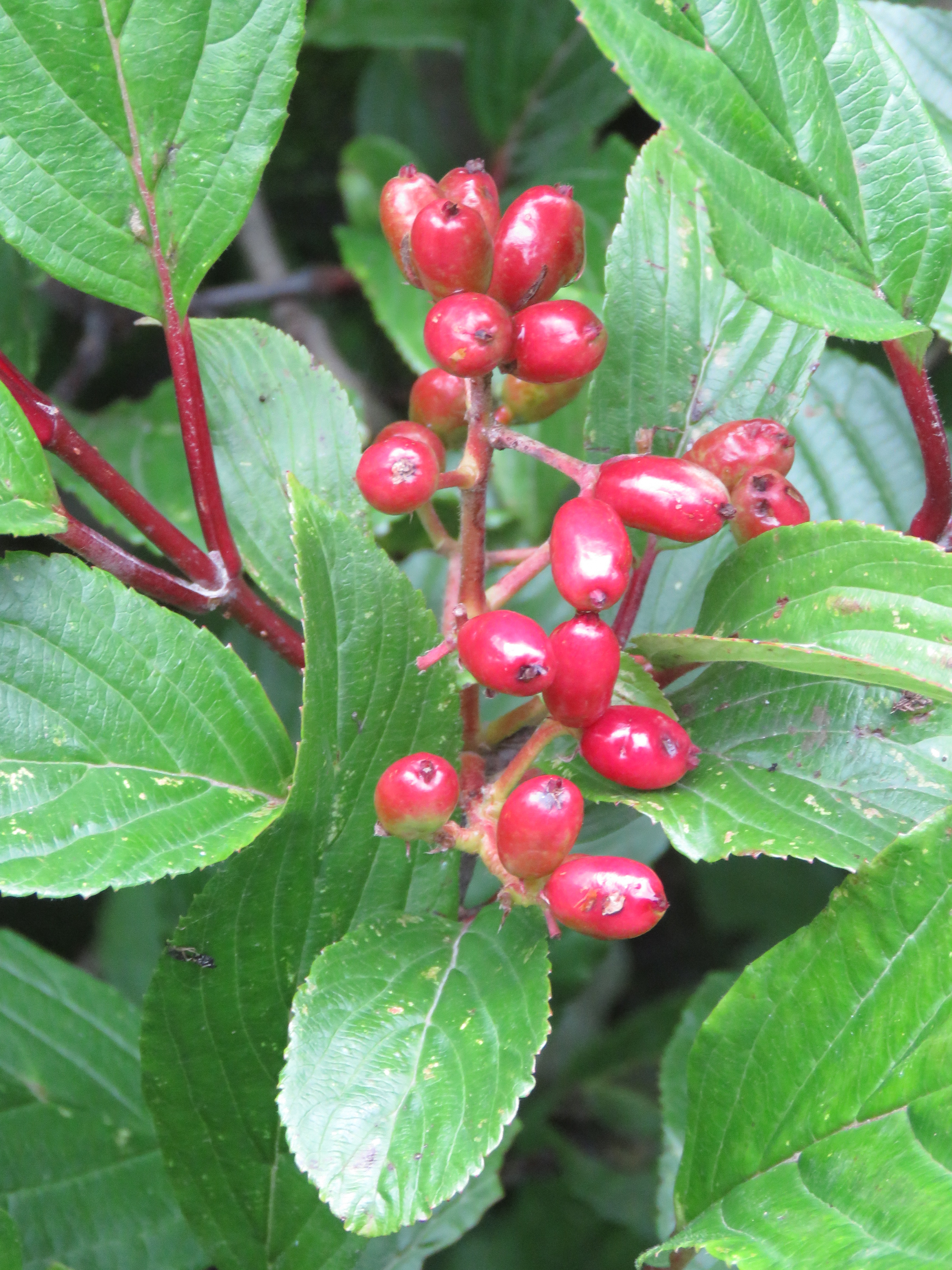
- Fruit

Scientific classification
- Kingdom: Plantae
- Clade: Tracheophytes
- Clade: Angiosperms
- Clade: Eudicots
- Clade: Asterids
- Order: Dipsacales
- Family: Adoxaceae
- Genus: Viburnum
- Species: V. erubescens

Binomial name
- Viburnum erubescens Wall. ex DC.

Synonyms
- List: Solenotinus erubescens (Wall. ex DC.) Oerst.; Viburnum botryoideum H.Lév.; Viburnum burmanicum (Rehder) C.Y.Wu; Viburnum burmanicum var. motoense P.S.Hsu; Viburnum erubescens var. parvum P.S.Hsu & S.C.Hsu; Viburnum prattii Graebn.; Viburnum pubigerum Wight & Arn.; Viburnum thibeticum C.Y.Wu & Y.F.Huang; Viburnum wightianum Wall.

= Viburnum erubescens =

Species of flowering plant

Viburnum erubescens, the reddish viburnum, is a species of flowering plant in the family Viburnaceae. It is native to Sri Lanka, India, Nepal, Bangladesh, China, Myanmar, and Vietnam. It is a deciduous shrub that grows in forests and scrub. Flowers are fragrant and bloom April to June. The unimproved species is available from commercial suppliers, as is a putative variety, Viburnum erubescens var. gracilipes, the slender blushing viburnum, and a number of cultivars, including 'Foster', 'Lloyd Kenyon', 'Milke Danda', and 'Ward van Teylingen'.
