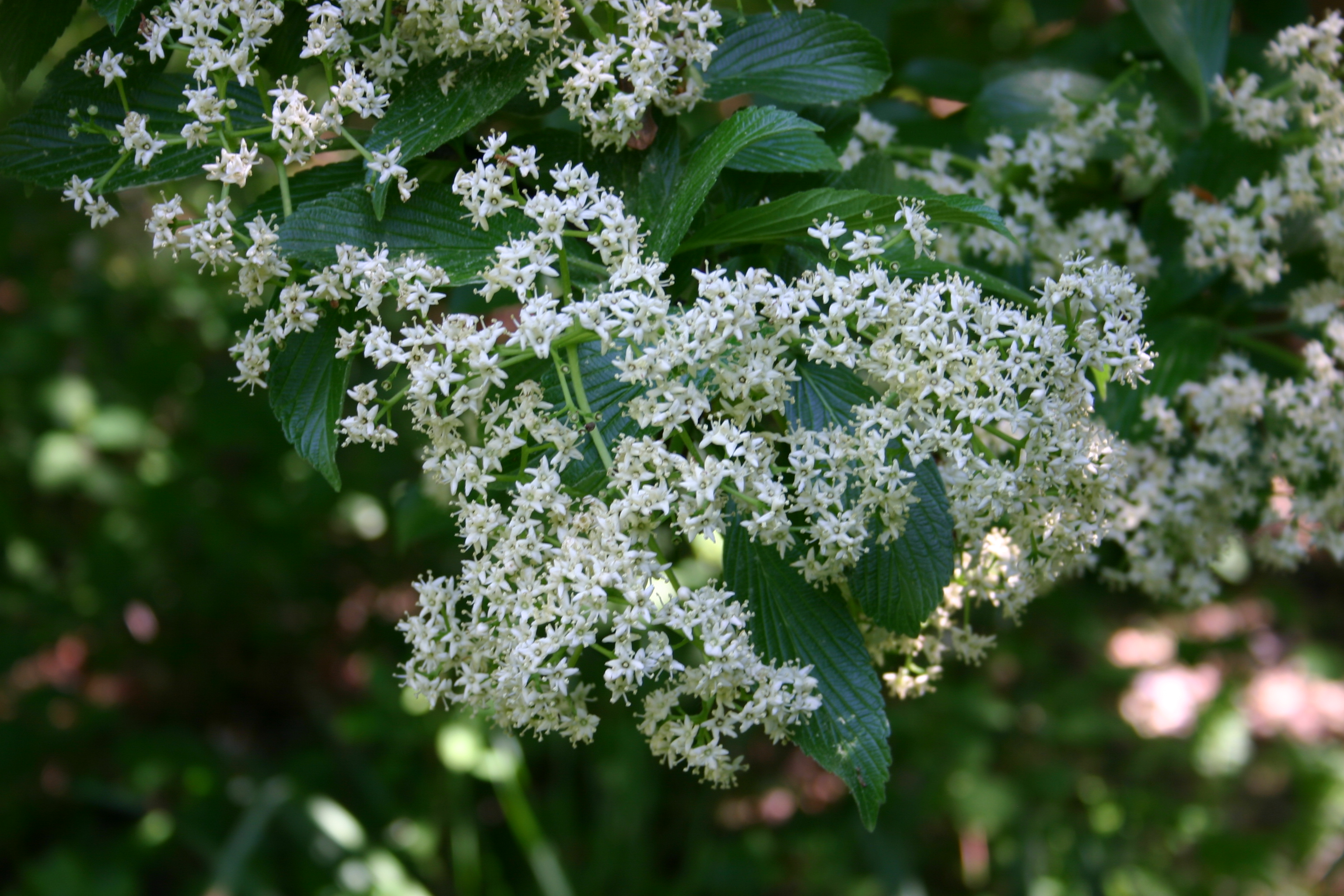
- inflorescence and foliage

Scientific classification
- Kingdom: Plantae
- Clade: Embryophytes
- Clade: Tracheophytes
- Clade: Spermatophytes
- Clade: Angiosperms
- Clade: Eudicots
- Clade: Asterids
- Order: Dipsacales
- Family: Viburnaceae
- Genus: Viburnum
- Species: V. sieboldii

Binomial name
- Viburnum sieboldii Miq.

= Viburnum sieboldii =

Species of flowering plant

Viburnum sieboldii, or Siebold's viburnum, is a plant in the family Viburnaceae.

== Description ==
Viburnum sieboldii is a large shrub or small tree with opposite, simple leaves, on stout, brittle stems. The flowers are white, borne in spring.
