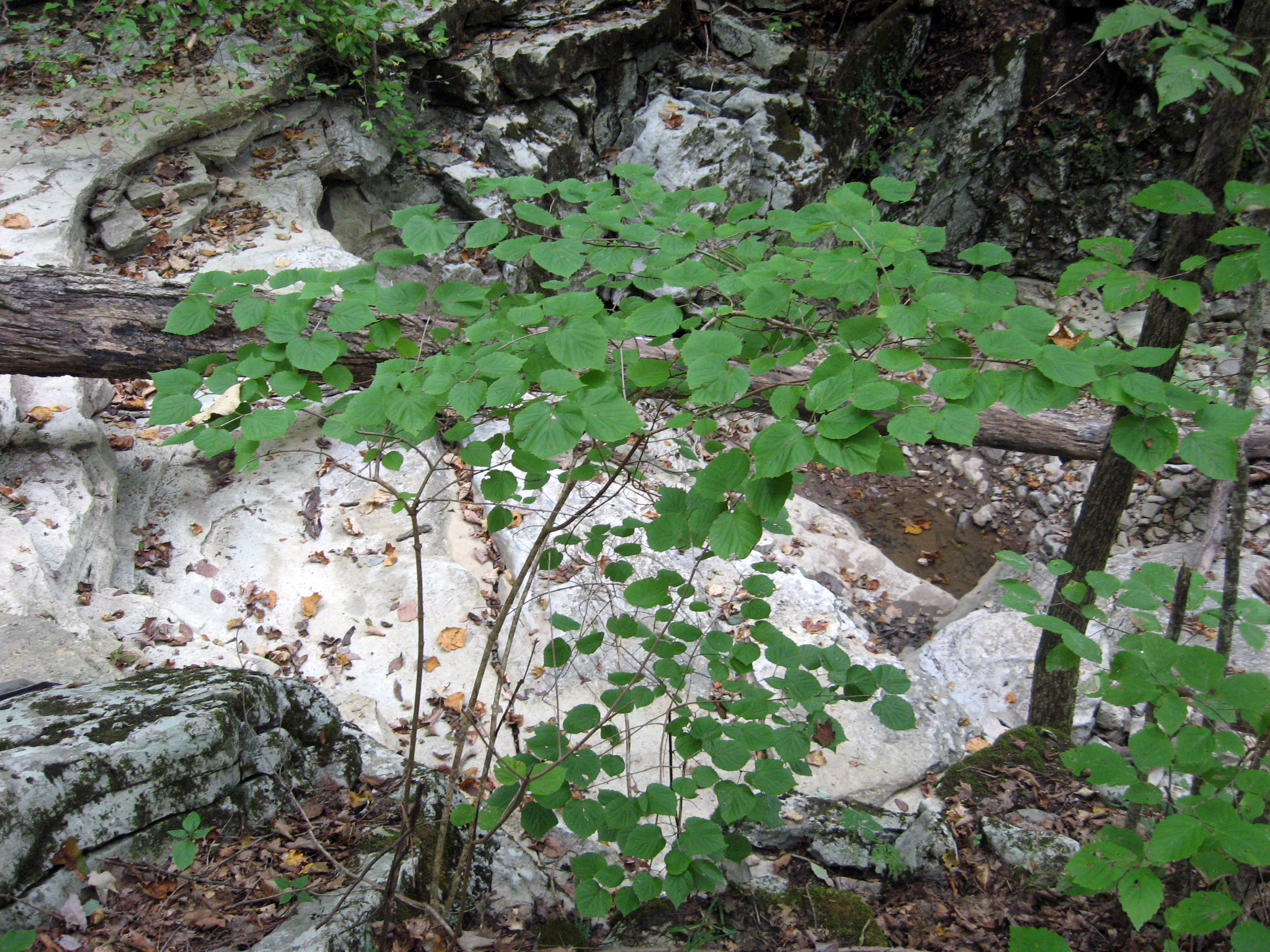

Conservation status
- Critically Imperiled (NatureServe)

Scientific classification
- Kingdom: Plantae
- Clade: Embryophytes
- Clade: Tracheophytes
- Clade: Spermatophytes
- Clade: Angiosperms
- Clade: Eudicots
- Clade: Asterids
- Order: Dipsacales
- Family: Viburnaceae
- Genus: Viburnum
- Species: V. bracteatum

Binomial name
- Viburnum bracteatum Rehder

= Viburnum bracteatum =

Species of flowering plant

Viburnum bracteatum is a species of flowering plant in the Viburnaceae known by the common names bracted arrowwood and limerock arrowwood. It is native to the southeastern United States, where it is limited to Alabama, Georgia, and Tennessee. Some authors include Viburnum ozarkense in this species, which would expand its distribution westward. Other authors include V. ozarkense in Viburnum molle, or retain it as a distinct species.

Viburnum bracteatum is a deciduous shrub with spreading and arching branches reaching up to 3 meters tall. The bark is smooth and gray in color. The oppositely arranged leaves have blades up to 12 centimeters long. They have toothed edges, with about one tooth per centimeter. The blades are borne on short petioles. The inflorescence is 4 to 6 centimeters wide with conspicuous bracts at the base. The flower has a circular corolla of five white petals about 8 millimeters across and five stamens tipped with yellow anthers. The fruit is a bluish black drupe about a centimeter wide. The fruits are eaten by birds, small mammals, and deer.

This plant grows in wooded areas with limestone substrates. The overstory includes several types of oak and Carya ovata var. australis.

There are about eleven occurrences of this rare plant, but only five are considered to be viable. It is threatened by limestone mining. This activity has destroyed or partially destroyed populations in the past.
