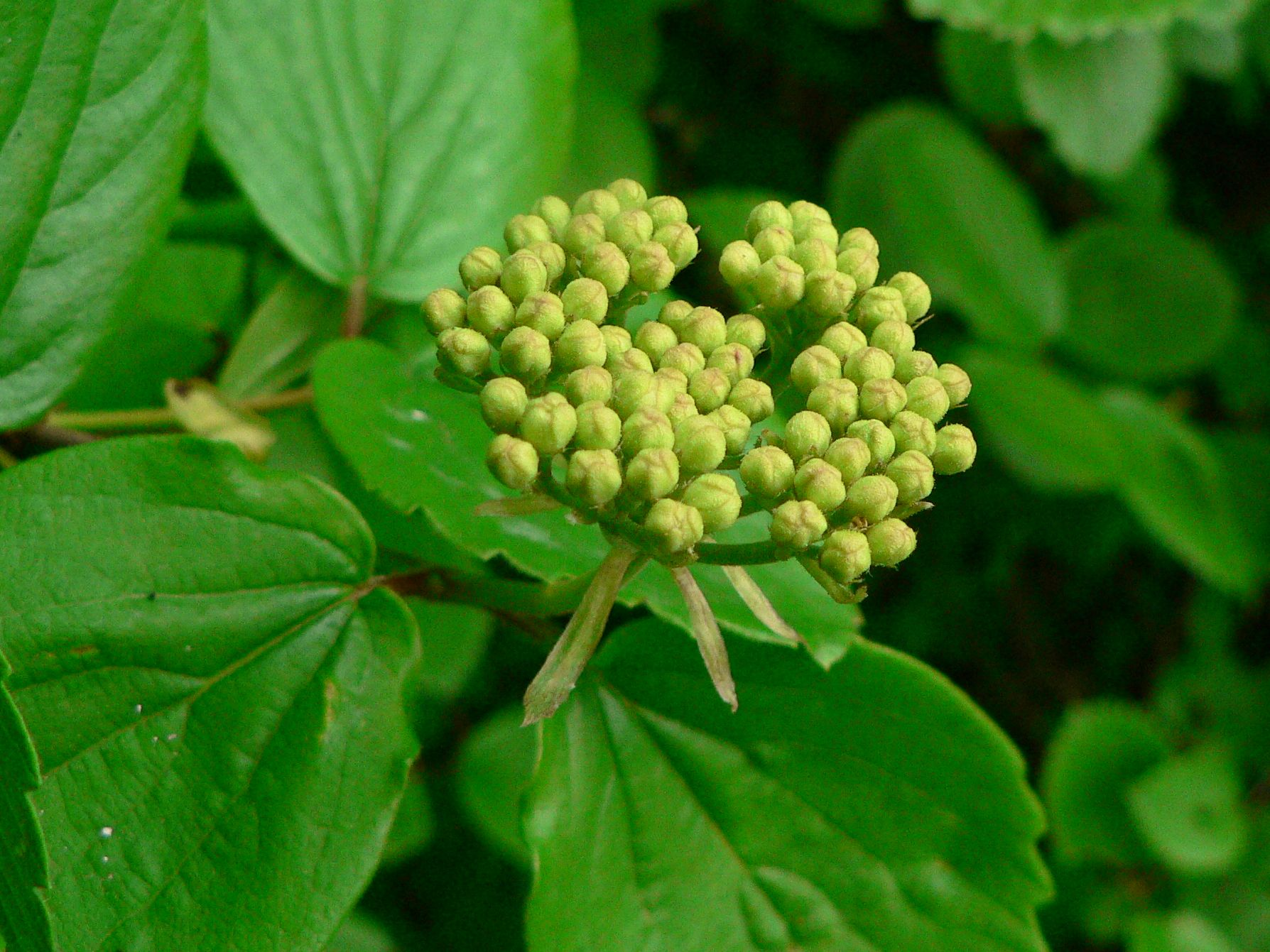

Conservation status
- Apparently Secure (NatureServe)

Scientific classification
- Kingdom: Plantae
- Clade: Tracheophytes
- Clade: Angiosperms
- Clade: Eudicots
- Clade: Asterids
- Order: Dipsacales
- Family: Viburnaceae
- Genus: Viburnum
- Species: V. ellipticum

Binomial name
- Viburnum ellipticum Hook.

Synonyms
- Viburnum ellipticum var. macrocarpum Suksd.

= Viburnum ellipticum =

Species of plant

Viburnum ellipticum, the common viburnum or oval-leaved viburnum, is a species of shrub in family Viburnaceae.

The shrub has deciduous leaves with oval or rounded blades 2 to 6 centimetres (3/4 to 2 1/4 in) long. The leaf blade usually has three main longitudinal veins and a shallowly toothed edge. The inflorescence is a flat-topped cyme of many unpleasant-smelling white flowers, each 6 to 8 millimetres (1/4 to 5/16 in) wide with five petals and five whiskery, white stamens. The fruit is a drupe about 1 cm long, red, blackening with age.

It is native to the western United States from Washington to central California, where it occurs in forests and mountain chaparral habitat.
