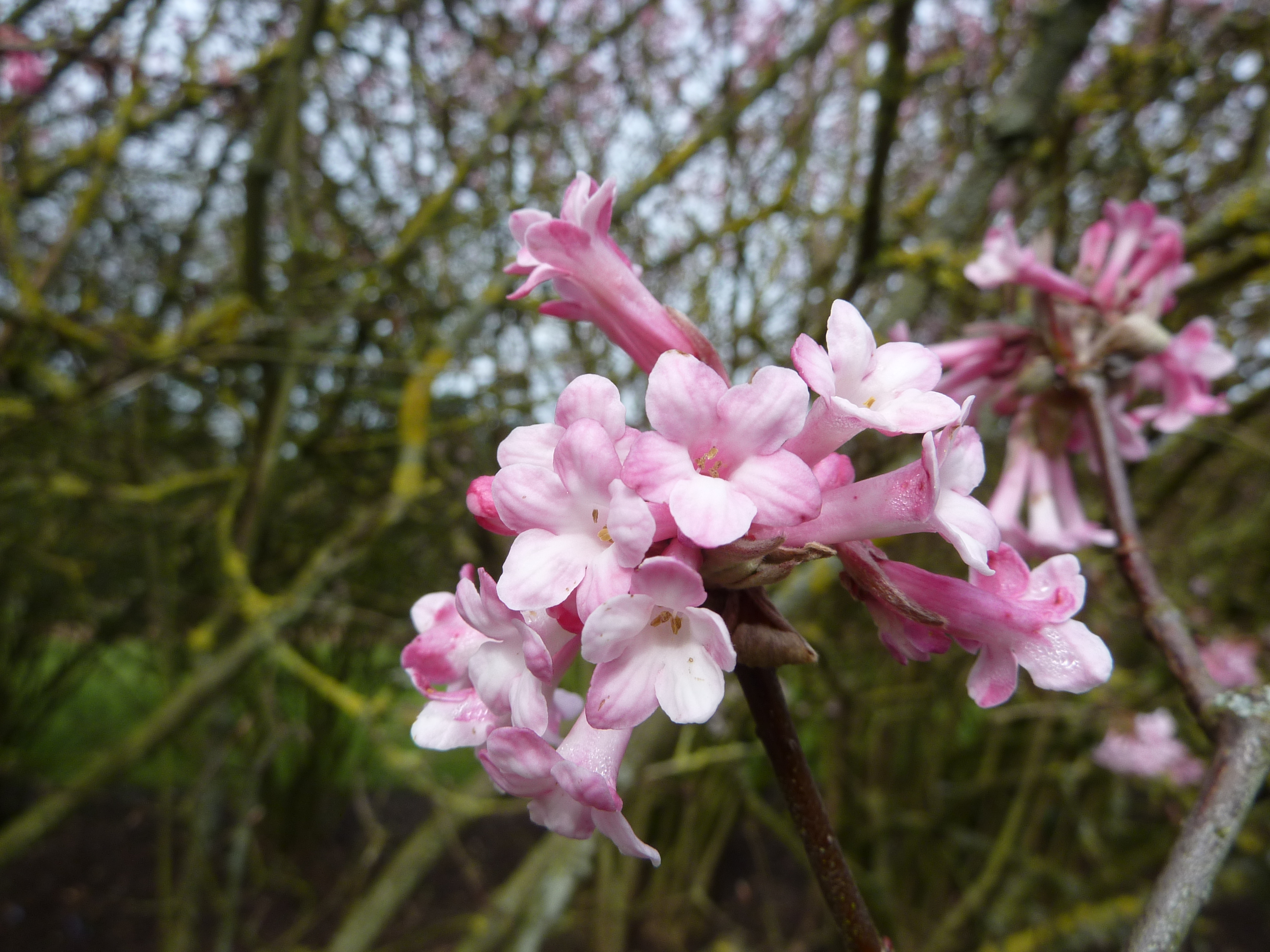
- At the Cambridge University Botanic Garden in March
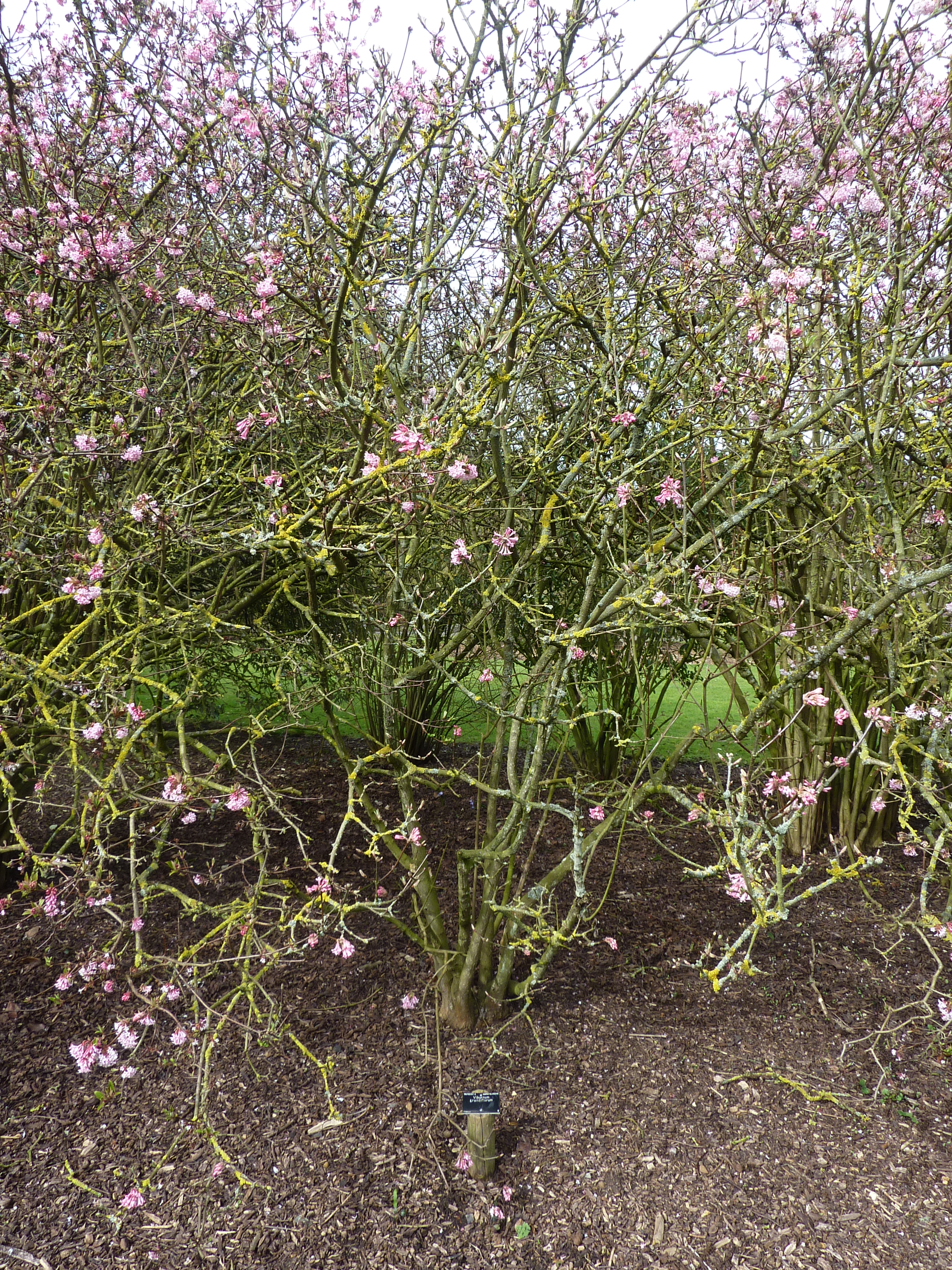
- Growth form

Scientific classification
- Kingdom: Plantae
- Clade: Tracheophytes
- Clade: Angiosperms
- Clade: Eudicots
- Clade: Asterids
- Order: Dipsacales
- Family: Adoxaceae
- Genus: Viburnum
- Species: V. grandiflorum

Binomial name
- Viburnum grandiflorum Wall. ex DC.

Synonyms
- Solenotinus foetens (Decne.) Oerst.; Viburnum foetens Decne.; Viburnum grandiflorum f. foetens (Decne.) N.P.Taylor & Zappi

= Viburnum grandiflorum =

Species of flowering plant

Viburnum grandiflorum, variously called the cranberry bush, flowering viburnum, grand viburnum, and Himalayan viburnum, is a species of flowering plant in the family Viburnaceae, native to the Himalayan region. It grows in open forests. A sparse shrub or gnarled tree reaching 2–3 m (7–10 ft), it has showy pink flowers larger than the typical viburnum, and red to black fruit, which are edible. It is hardy to USDA zone 6a. The unimproved species is available from commercial suppliers, as is a putative form, Viburnum grandiflorum f. foetens, the stinking Himalayan viburnum, and a number of cultivars, including 'De Oirsprong', 'Desmond Clarke', and 'Snow White'.
