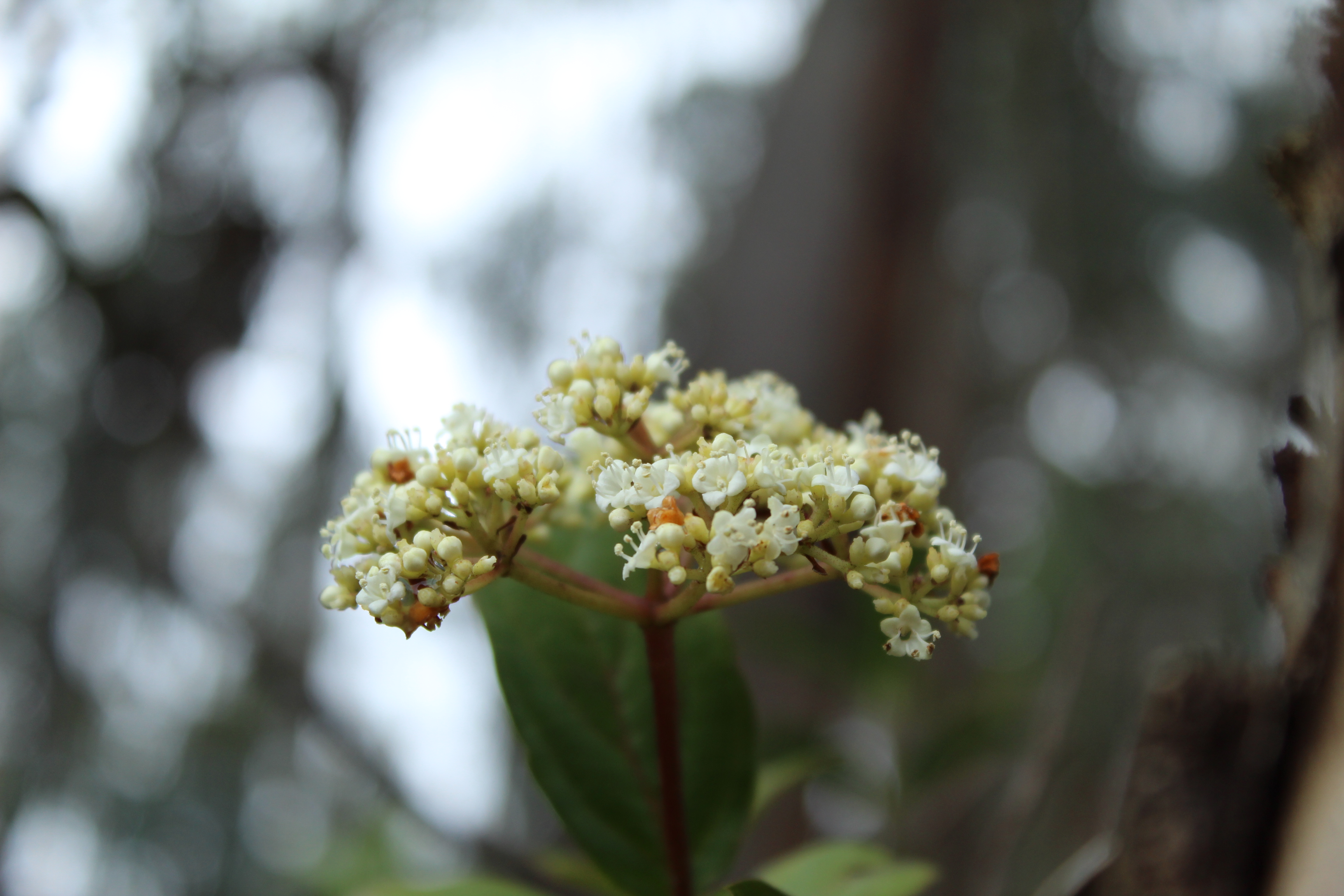
- Viburnum triphyllum in Paipa, Colombia.

Scientific classification
- Kingdom: Plantae
- Clade: Embryophytes
- Clade: Tracheophytes
- Clade: Spermatophytes
- Clade: Angiosperms
- Clade: Eudicots
- Clade: Asterids
- Order: Dipsacales
- Family: Viburnaceae
- Genus: Viburnum
- Species: V. triphyllum

Binomial name
- Viburnum triphyllum Benth.

Synonyms
- Oreinotinus laurifolius Oerst..; Oreinotinus triphyllus (Benth.) Oerst.

= Viburnum triphyllum =

Species of flowering plant

Viburnum triphyllum is a plant of the family Viburnaceae, native to South America. Commonly known in Spanish as chuchua or chuque.

== Description ==
It is a tree that can reach up to 15 meters high, has a crooked trunk that is a characteristic of the vegetation of the high Andean forests. Its leaves are lemon green and pale green on the underside and its texture is similar to that of cardboard paper. Its flowers are white, grouped in an umbrella-shaped inflorescence (umbel), which exhales a pleasant smell. The fruits are fleshy, their color is red wine when ripe.

== Distribution ==
It is distributed in the Andean forest areas at a height of between 2400 and 3400 meters above sea level; in Bolivia, Colombia, Ecuador and Peru.

== Ecology ==
This species is of great importance in ecological restoration due to its high rate of foliar exchange, its association with fungi (mycorrhizae) and nitrogen fixing bacteria. In addition, they usually support nutrient-poor, shallow and eroded soils.

== Uses ==
Its wood is used in construction and as fuel for wood furnaces, the tree has tannins in its bark, used in tanneries; from its fruits a violet dye is obtained that can be used in handicraft work. Ornamental is planted in parks and road separators. Ecologically provides good food for birds and insects, especially bee). It is useful in watershed protection, and is an inductor of restoration processes. It is also used as a live fence and windbreaker.

== Common names in Spanish ==
Bodoquero, chucua, chuque, garrocho, juco, morochillo, pelotillo, pita, ruque, sauco de monte.
