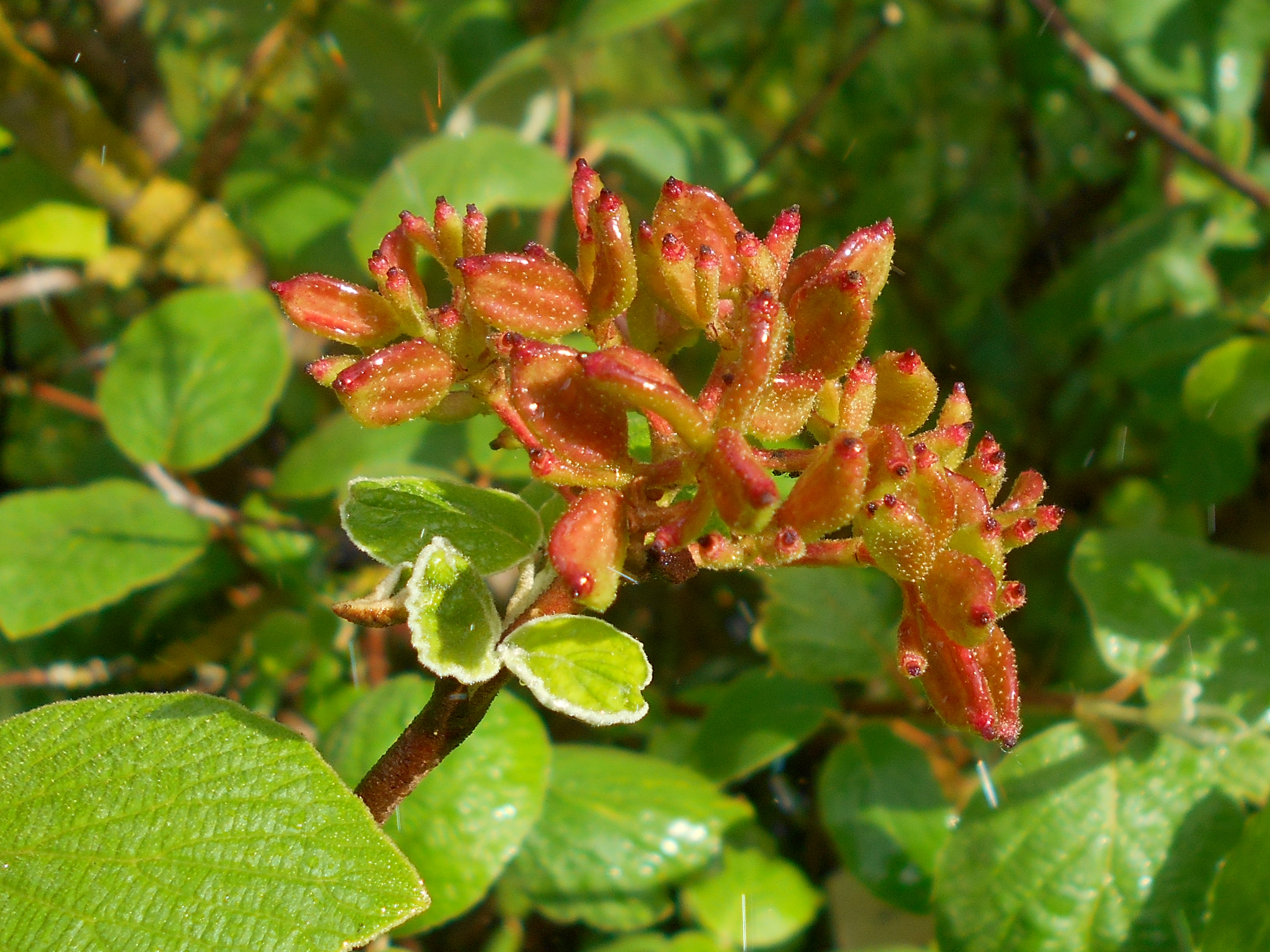
- Flowerbuds

Scientific classification
- Kingdom: Plantae
- Clade: Tracheophytes
- Clade: Angiosperms
- Clade: Eudicots
- Clade: Asterids
- Order: Dipsacales
- Family: Adoxaceae
- Genus: Viburnum
- Species: V. cotinifolium

Binomial name
- Viburnum cotinifolium D.Don

= Viburnum cotinifolium =

Species of flowering plant

Viburnum cotinifolium, the Indian wayfaring tree, is a species of flowering plant in the family Viburnaceae. It is a deciduous shrub native to the Himalayan region. Its fruit is regularly consumed by Asiatic black bears (Ursus thibetanus).

== Subtaxa ==
The following varieties are accepted:

- Viburnum cotinifolium var. cotinifolium
- Viburnum cotinifolium var. lacei T.R.Dudley – northern Pakistan to the western Himalayas
- Viburnum cotinifolium var. wallichii T.R.Dudley – Nepal
