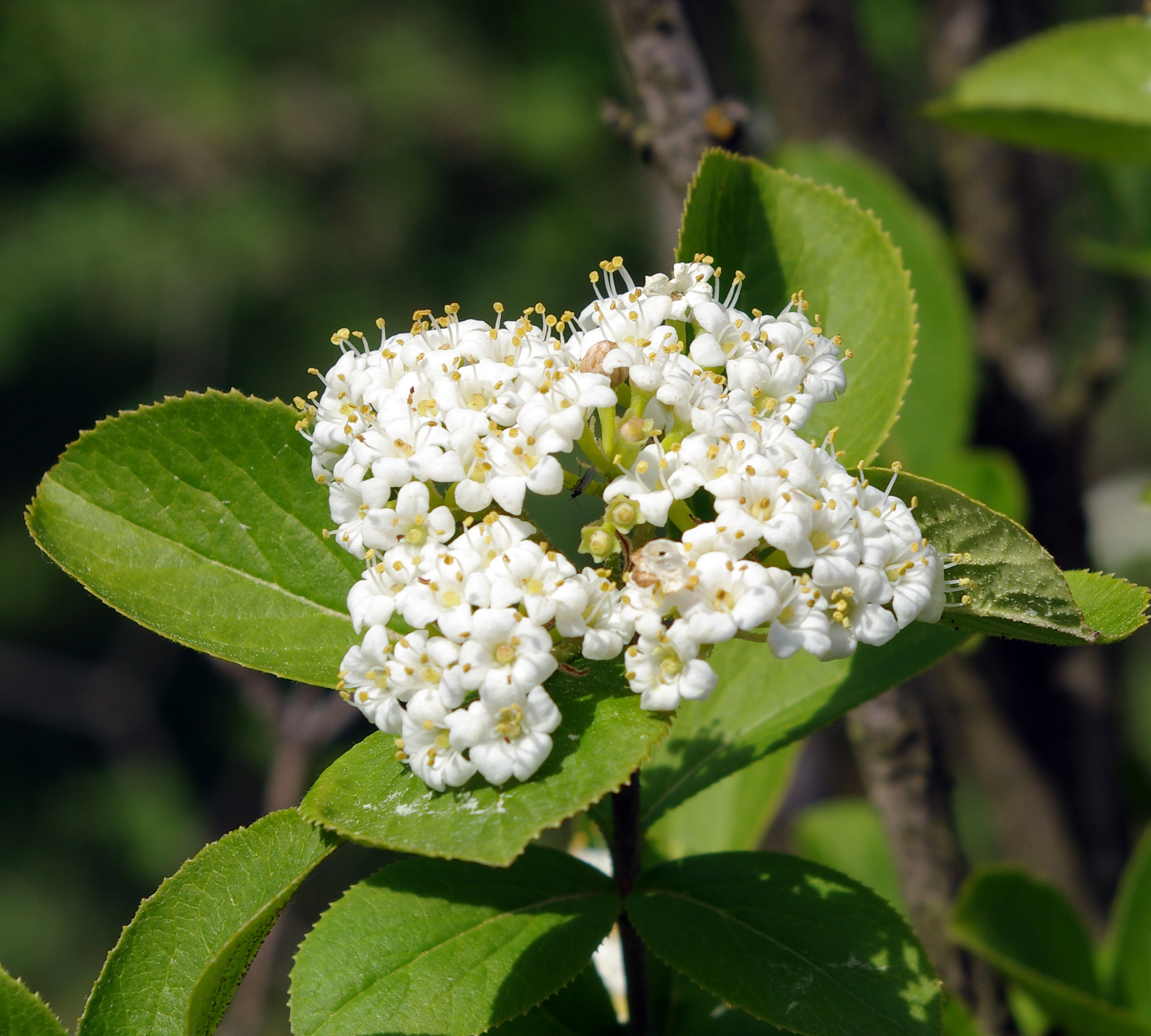
- Flowers and foliage

Scientific classification
- Kingdom: Plantae
- Clade: Tracheophytes
- Clade: Angiosperms
- Clade: Eudicots
- Clade: Asterids
- Order: Dipsacales
- Family: Adoxaceae
- Genus: Viburnum
- Species: V. burejaeticum

Binomial name
- Viburnum burejaeticum Regel & Herder

Synonyms
- Viburnum arcuatum Kom.

= Viburnum burejaeticum =

Species of flowering plant

Viburnum burejaeticum, the Manchurian viburnum, is a species of flowering plant in the family Viburnaceae. It is native to Mongolia, Manchuria, the Korean Peninsula, and the Russian Far East. It is a showy deciduous shrub, reaching 3–4 m (10–13 ft) tall, but only 1.5–2.5 m (5–8 ft) wide.
