= Viburnum arboreum =

Conservation status
- Vulnerable (IUCN 2.3)

Scientific classification
- Kingdom: Plantae
- Clade: Embryophytes
- Clade: Tracheophytes
- Clade: Spermatophytes
- Clade: Angiosperms
- Clade: Eudicots
- Clade: Asterids
- Order: Dipsacales
- Family: Viburnaceae
- Genus: Viburnum
- Species: V. arboreum

Binomial name
- Viburnum arboreum Britton

Species of flowering plant

Viburnum arboreum is a species of plant in the family Viburnaceae. It is endemic to Jamaica.
