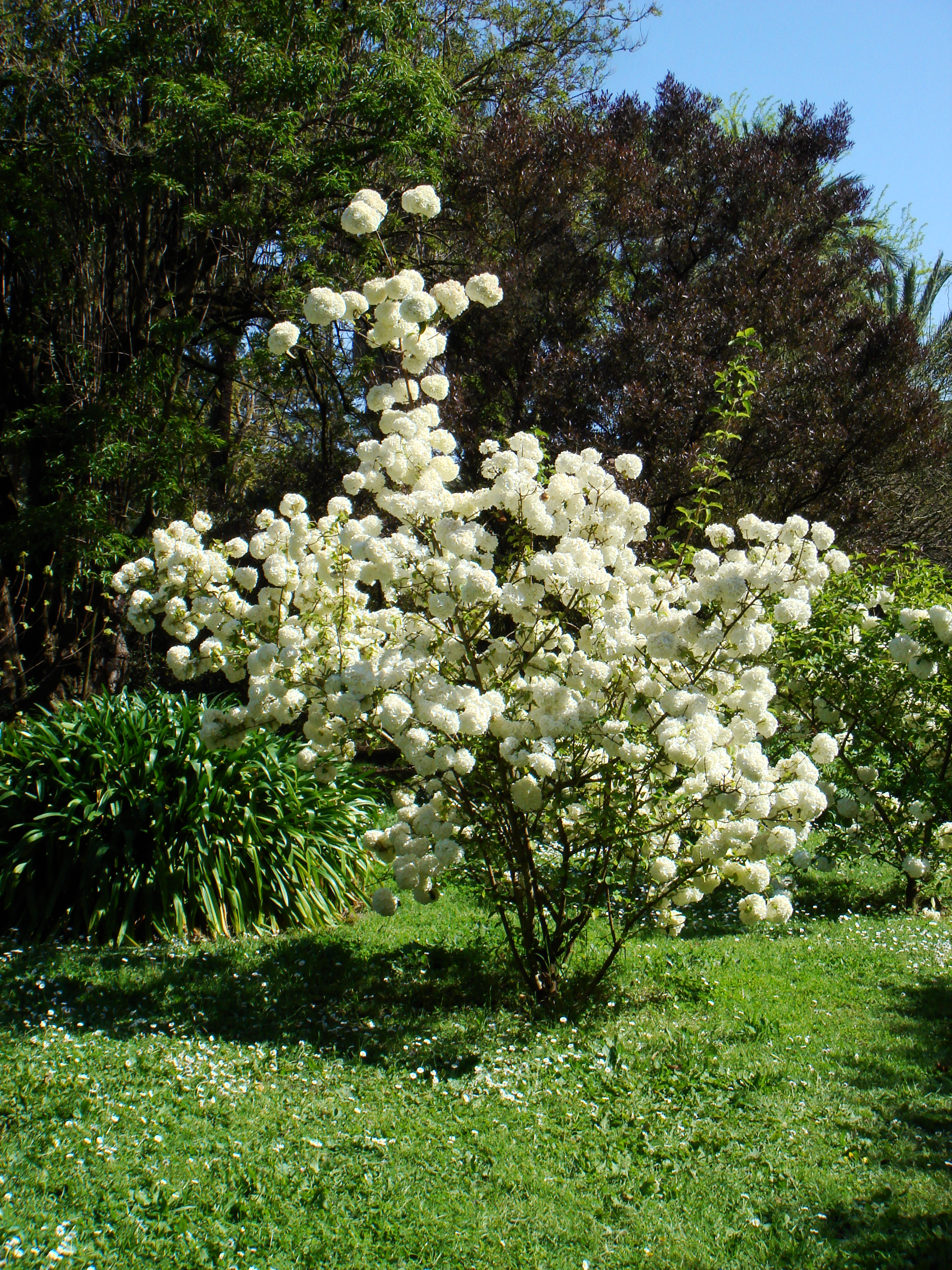
- Chinese snowball

Scientific classification
- Kingdom: Plantae
- Clade: Tracheophytes
- Clade: Angiosperms
- Clade: Eudicots
- Clade: Asterids
- Order: Dipsacales
- Family: Viburnaceae
- Genus: Viburnum
- Species: V. macrocephalum

Binomial name
- Viburnum macrocephalum Fortune

= Viburnum macrocephalum =

Species of flowering plant in the family Adoxaceae

Viburnum macrocephalum (Chinese: 繡球莢蒾 "hydrangea viburnum", or 木繡球 "tree hydrangea"), common name Chinese snowball, is a species of flowering plant in the family Adoxaceae (formerly Caprifoliaceae), native to mainland China. Its fertile form, Viburnum macrocephalum f. keteleeri (Chinese: 瓊花, qiong hua, "white jade flower"), is of great cultural significance in China.

== Gallery ==
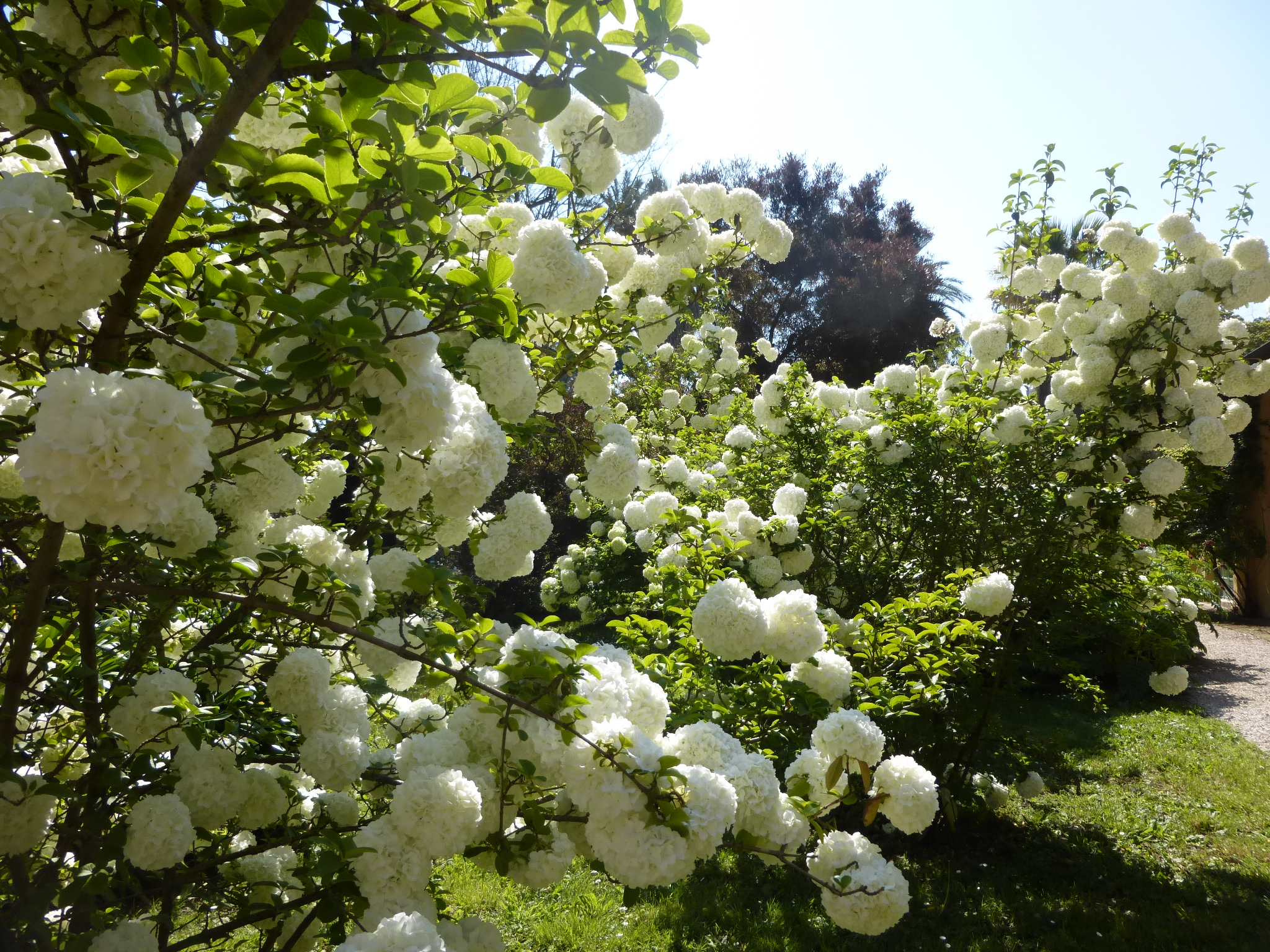
Viburnum macrocephalum

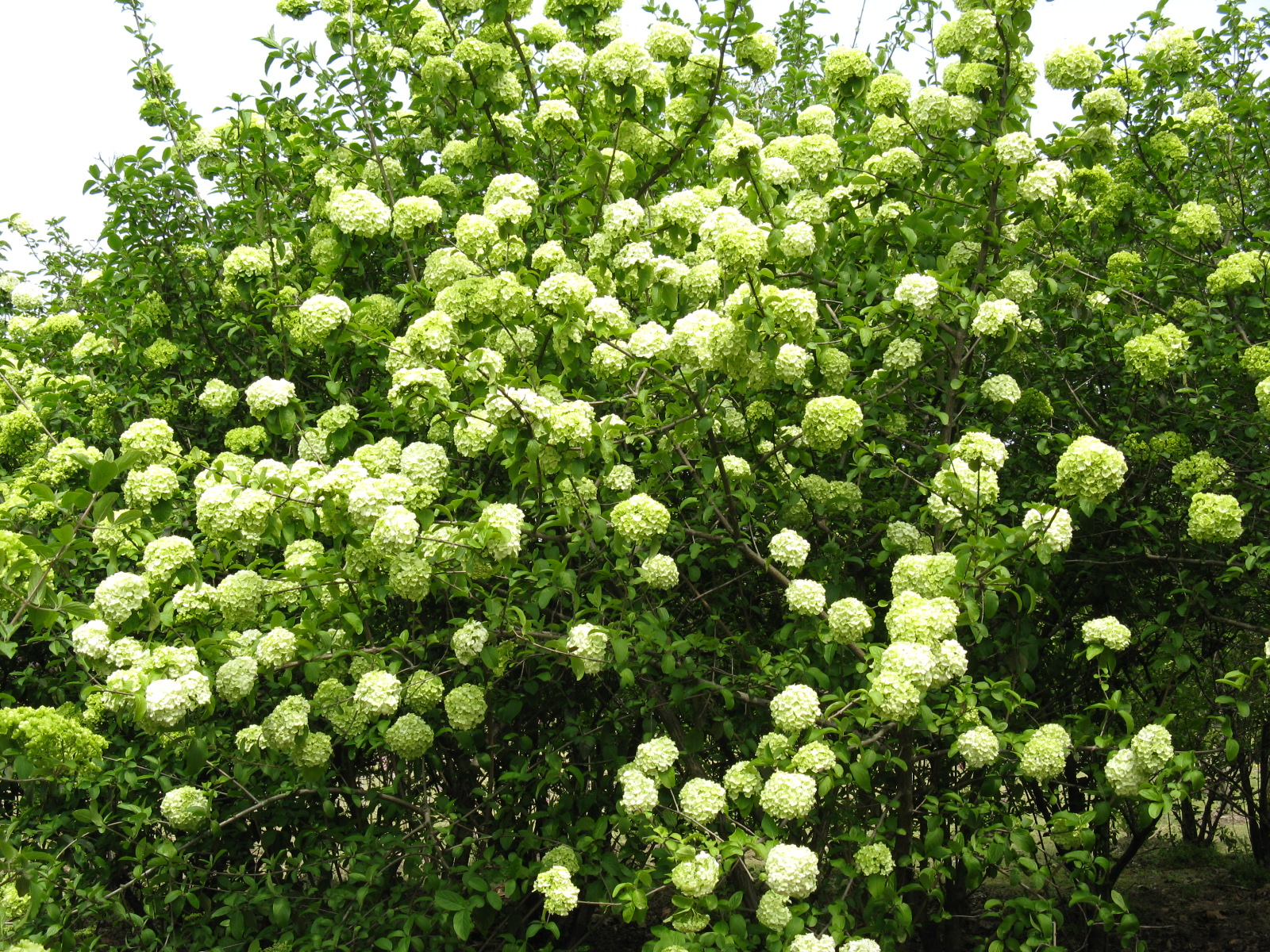
Viburnum macrocephalum

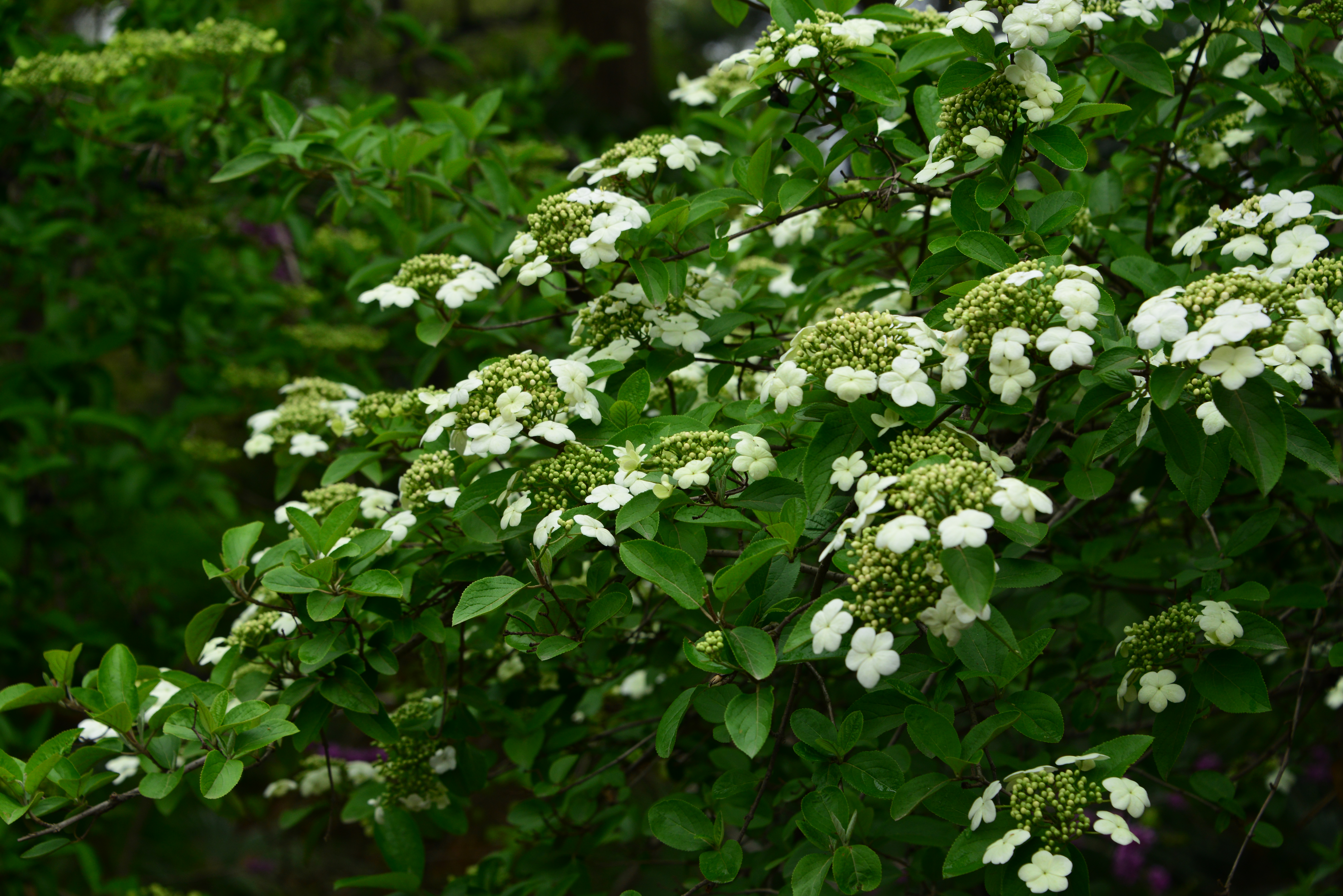
Viburnum macrocephalum f. keteleeri

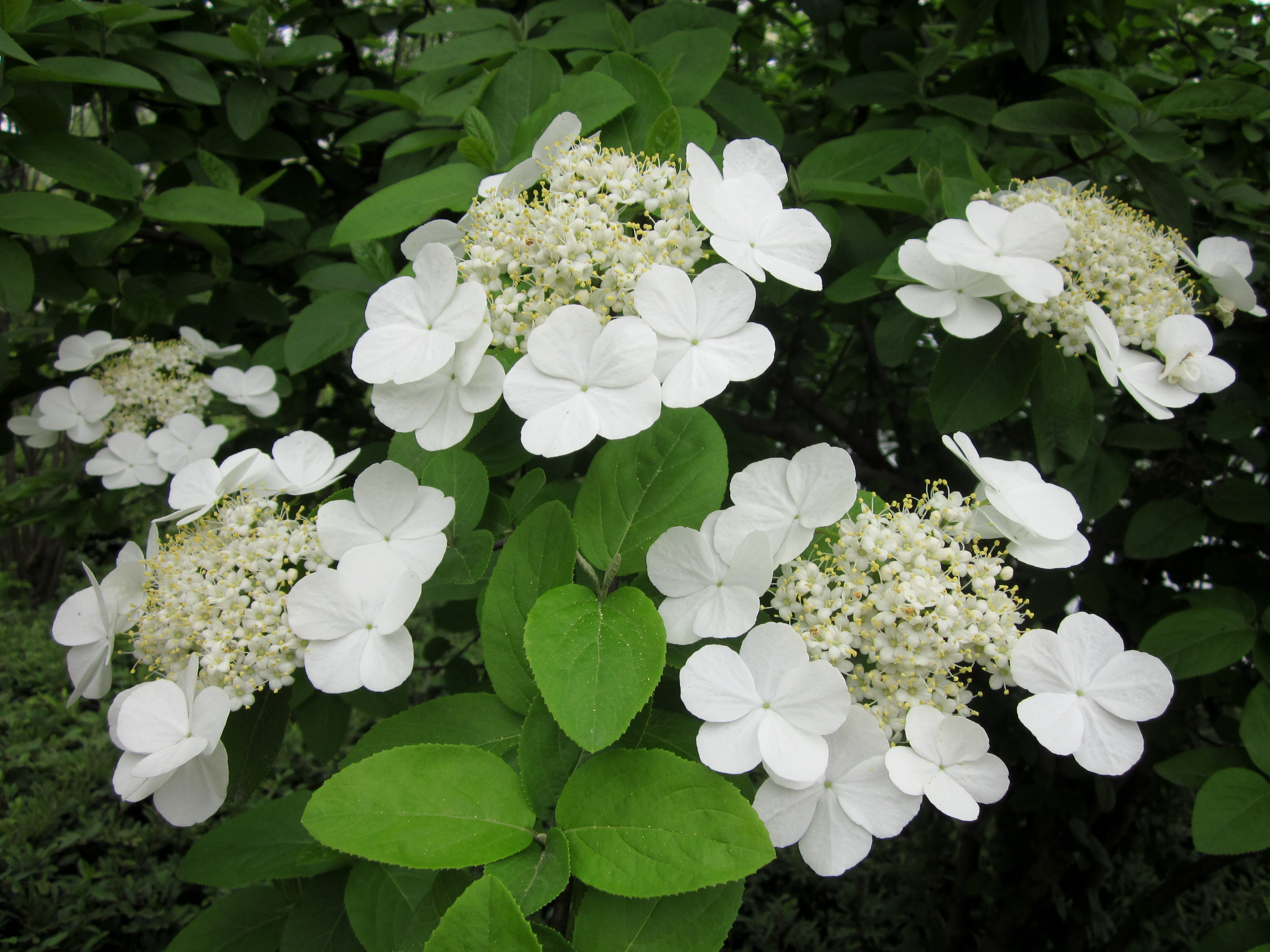
Viburnum macrocephalum f. keteleeri
