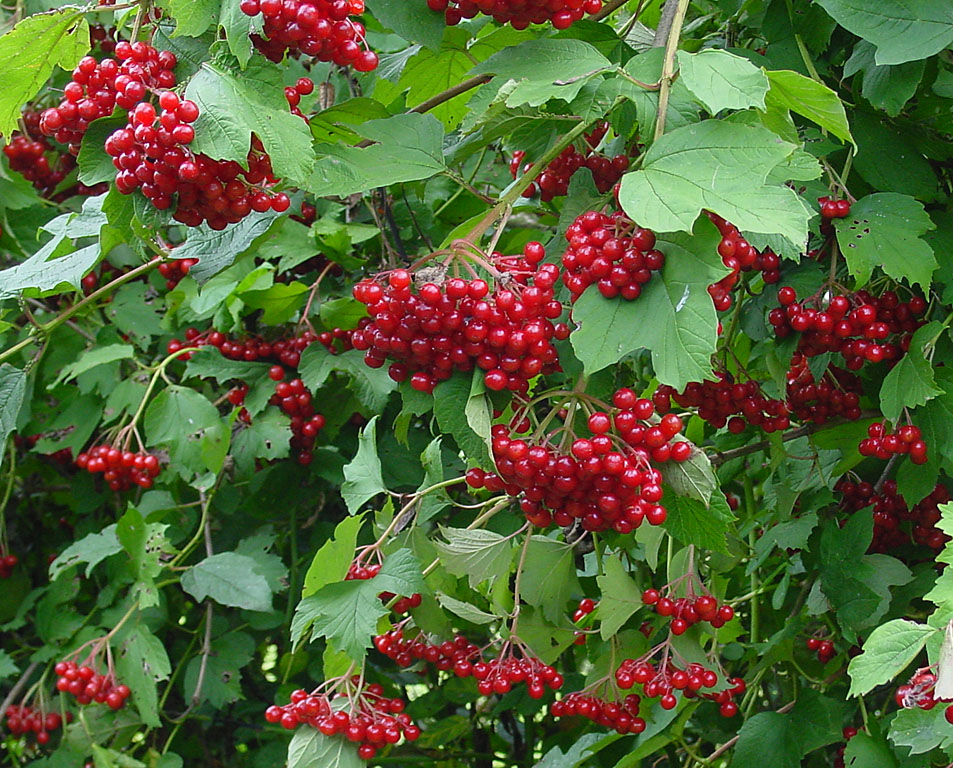
- Viburnum opulus fruit

Scientific classification
- Kingdom: Plantae
- Clade: Tracheophytes
- Clade: Angiosperms
- Clade: Eudicots
- Clade: Asterids
- Order: Dipsacales
- Family: Viburnaceae
- Genus: Viburnum; L.

Species
- See text

= Viburnum =

Genus of flowering plants

Viburnum is a genus of about 150–175 species of flowering plants in the family Viburnaceae. Its current classification is based on molecular phylogeny. It was previously included in the family Caprifoliaceae.

The member species are evergreen or deciduous shrubs or (in a few cases) small trees native throughout the temperate Northern Hemisphere, with a few species extending into tropical montane regions in South America and southeast Asia. In Africa, the genus is confined to the Atlas Mountains.

== Name ==
The generic name Viburnum originated in Latin, in which it referred to V. lantana.

== Description ==
The leaves are opposite, simple, and entire, with toothed or lobed margins. Cool temperate species are deciduous, while most of the warm temperate species are evergreen. Some species have densely hairy shoots and leaves covered in star-shaped hairs. Almost all species have stipules on petioles, except tropical species found in Malesia.

The flowers are produced in corymbs 5–15 cm (2.0–5.9 in) across. Each flower is white, cream or pink, small (3–5 mm [0.12–0.20 in] across), and has five petals. Some species are strongly fragrant. The gynoecium has three connate carpels with the nectary located at the top of the gynoecium. Some species also have a fringe of large, showy sterile flowers around the perimeter of the corymb, serving as a pollinator target.

The fruit is a spherical, oval, or somewhat flattened drupe that is red, purple, blue, or black, and contains a single seed. Some fruits are edible, but many others are mildly poisonous. The leaves are eaten by the larvae of many lepidopteran species.

== Species ==
Around 165 species are described. A 2014 phylogenetic study proposed the following phylogenetic scheme and sections:

Viburnum Phylogenetic Tree

- Viburnum
  - V. clemensiae
  - Regulaviburnum
    - Valvatotinus
      - Lentago (7 species)
      - Paleovaltinus
        - Punctata (2)
        - Euviburnum (15)
    - Pseudotinus (4)
    - Pluriviburnum
      - Perplexitinus
        - Amplicrenotinus
          - Crenotinus
            - Solenotinus (22)
            - Lutescentia
              - V. amplifolium
              - V. colebrookeanum
              - V. garrettii
              - V. junghunii
              - V. laterale
              - V. pyramidatum
              - V. lutescens
              - Tomentosa (2)
          - V. amplificatum
        - Urceolata (2)
      - Nectarotinus
        - Tinus (8)
        - Imbricotinus
          - Laminotinus
            - Corrisuccotinus
              - V. acerifolium
              - V. kansuense
              - V. orientale
              - Succotinus (34)
              - Coriaceae (3)
            - Sambucina (10)
          - Opulus (5)
          - Porphyrotinus
            - Mollotinus (5)
            - Oreinodentinus
              - Dentata (3)
              - Oreinotinus (30)

- V. clemensiae Kern

Lentago – Eastern North America

- V. cassinoides L. – Witherod viburnum, wild raisin, Appalachian tea
- V. elatum Benth
- V. lentago L. – nannyberry
- V. nudum L. – possumhaw
- V. obovatum Walter – Small-leaf Virbunum
- V. prunifolium L. – blackhaw
- V. rufidulum Raf. – rusty blackhaw

Punctata

- Viburnum lepidotulum Merr. & Chun
- Viburnum punctatum Buch.-Ham. Ex D. Don

Euviburnum

- V. bitchiuense Makino
- V. buddleifolium
- V. burejaeticum Regel et Herder
- V. carlesii Hemsl. Ex Forb. & Hemsl. – Korean spice viburnum
- V. cotinifolium D. Don
- V. lantana L. – wayfaring tree, hoarwithy
- V. macrocephalum Fortune – Chinese viburnum (琼花)
- V. mongolicum (Pall.)Rehder
- V. rhytidophyllum Hemsl. Ex Forb. & Hemsl. – wrinkled viburnum
- V. schensianum Maxim.
- V. utile Hemsl. – service viburnum
- V. veitchii C.H. Wright

Pseudotinus – Asia, except V. lantanoides in Eastern North America

- V. furcatum Blume ex Hook.f. & Thomson – forked viburnum, scarlet leaved viburnum
- V. lantanoides Michx. – hobble-bush, American wayfaring tree
- V. nervosum D. Don
- V. sympodiale Graebn.

Solenotinus – Asia, extending west to India and south to Indonesia

- V. awabuki Hort.Berol. Ex K. Koch
- V. brachybotryum Hemsl.
- V. chingii P.S. Hsu
- V. corymbiflorum P.S. Hsu & S.C. Hsu
- V. erubescens Wall
- V. farreri Stearn – Farrer's viburnum
- V. foetens
- V. grandiflorum Wall. Ex DC – Himalayan viburnum
- V. henryi Hemsl.
- V. odoratissimum Ker-Gawl. – sweet viburnum
- V. oliganthum Batalin
- V. sieboldii Miq. – Siebold's viburnum
- V. subalpinum Hand.-Mazz.
- V. suspensum Lindl. – Sandankwa viburnum
- V. taitoense Hayata

Lutescentia (excluding Tomentosa)

- V. amplifolium
- V. colebrookeanum Wall. Ex DC
- V. garrettii
- V. junghunii
- V. laterale
- V. lutescens Blume
- V. pyramidatum

Tomentosa – China, Japan

- V. plicatum Thunberg – Japanese snowball
- V. hanceanum

Amplicrenotinus (excluding Crenotinus)

- V. amplificatum J. Kern

Urceolata

- V. taiwanianum Hayata
- V. urceolatum Siebold & Zucc.

Tinus – Asia, except V. tinus in Europe

- V. atrocyaneum C.B. Clarke
- V. calvum Rehder
- V. cinnamomifolium Rehder – cinnamon-leaved viburnum
- V. davidii Franchet – David viburnum
- V. propinquum Hemsl.
- V. rigidum Vent.
- V. tinus M.J. – Laurustinus
- V. triplinerve

Corisuccotinus (excluding Succotinus and Coriaceae)

- V. acerifolium L. – maple-leaf viburnum
- V. kansuense Batalin
- V. orientale Pall.

Succotinus

- V. adenophorum W.W. Sm.
- V. annamensis Fukouoka
- V. betulifolium Batalin
- V. brachyandrum Nakai
- V. corylifolium Hook.f. & Thomson
- V. dilatatum Thunberg – linden viburnum
- V. erosum Thunberg
- V. flavescens W.W. Sm.
- V. foetidum (Graebn.) Rehder
- V. formosanum Hayata
- V. hupehense Rehder
- V. ichangense Rehder
- V. integrifolium Hayata
- V. japonicum Spreng
- V. lobophyllum
- V. luzonicum Rolfe
- V. melanocarpum Hsu in Chen et al.
- V. mullaha Buch.-Ham. Ex D.Don
- V. parvifolium Hayata
- V. sempervirens K. Koch
- V. setigerum M.J. Donoghue – tea viburnum
- V. tashiroi Nakai
- V. wrightii Miquel – Wright's viburnum

Coriaceae

- V. coriaceum Blume
- V. cylindricum Buch.-Ham. ex D. Don
- V. hebanthum Wight & Arn.

Sambucina

- V. beccarii Gamble
- V. hispidulum J. Kern
- V. inopinatum Craib.
- V. sambucinum Reinew. Ex Blume
- V. vernicosum Gibbs
- V. ternatum Rehder

Opulus – Circumboreal

- V. edule Raf. – squashberry, mooseberry, pembina, pimbina, lowbush cranberry, moosomin (Cree language)
- V. koreanum – Korean viburnum
- V. opulus L. – Guelder-rose
- V. sargentii Koehne – Tianmu viburnum (天目琼花)
- V. trilobum Marshall – high bush viburnum

Mollotinus

- V. australe C.V. Morton – Mexican arrowwood
- V. bracteatum Rehder – bracted arrowwood, limerock arrowwood
- V. ellipticum Hook. – common viburnum, oval-leaved viburnum
- V. molle Michx. – softleaf arrowwood
- V. rafinesquianum Schult. – downy arrowwood

Dentata – Mexico, Caribbean, and Central and South America

- V. dentatum L. – arrowwood viburnum
- V. recognitum Fernald – smooth arrowwood

Oreinotinus – Mexico, Caribbean, and Central and South America

- V. acutifolium Benth.
- V. caudatum Greenm.
- V. costaricanum (Oerst.) Hemsl.
- V. discolor Benth.
- V. disjunctum C.V. Morton
- V. divaricatum
- V. jamesonii (Oerst.)Killip & A.C. Sm.
- V. jucundum C.V. Morton
- V. lautum C.V. Morton
- V. loeseneri Graebn.
- V. stellato-tomentosum (Oerst.) Hemsl.
- V. stenocalyx Hemsl.
- V. sulcatum (Oerst.) Hemsl.
- V. toronis Killip & A.C. Sm.
- V. triphyllum Benth. – chuchua, chuque

Undetermined

- V. arboreum
- V. betulifolium Batalin
- V. glomeratum
- V. hondurense
- V. maculatum
- V. molinae
- V. mortonianum
- V. phlebotrichum
- V. scabrellum
- V. subpubescens
- V. treleasei
- V. tridentatum
- V. venosum (or V. dentata var venosum)

=== Formerly placed here ===
- Hydrangea arborescens L. (as V. alnifolium Marshall, or V. americanum Mill.)
- Hydrangea macrophylla (Thunb.) Ser. (as V. macrophyllum Thunb.)

== Cultivation and uses ==
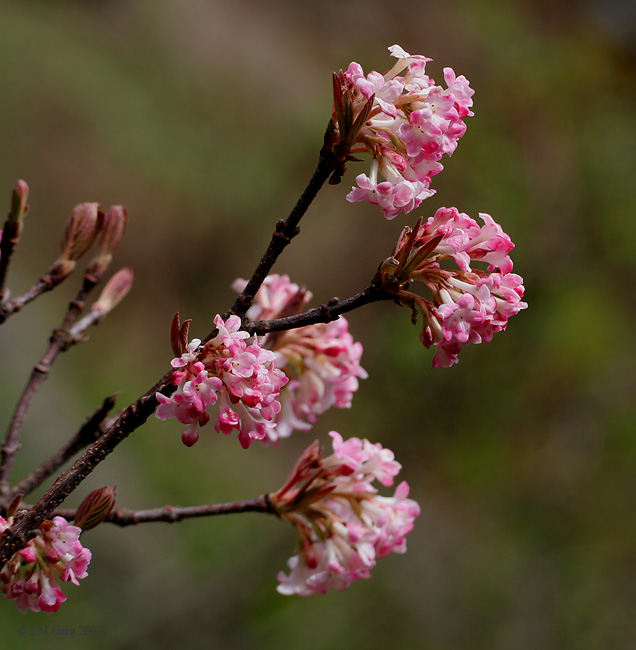
Viburnum grandiflorum

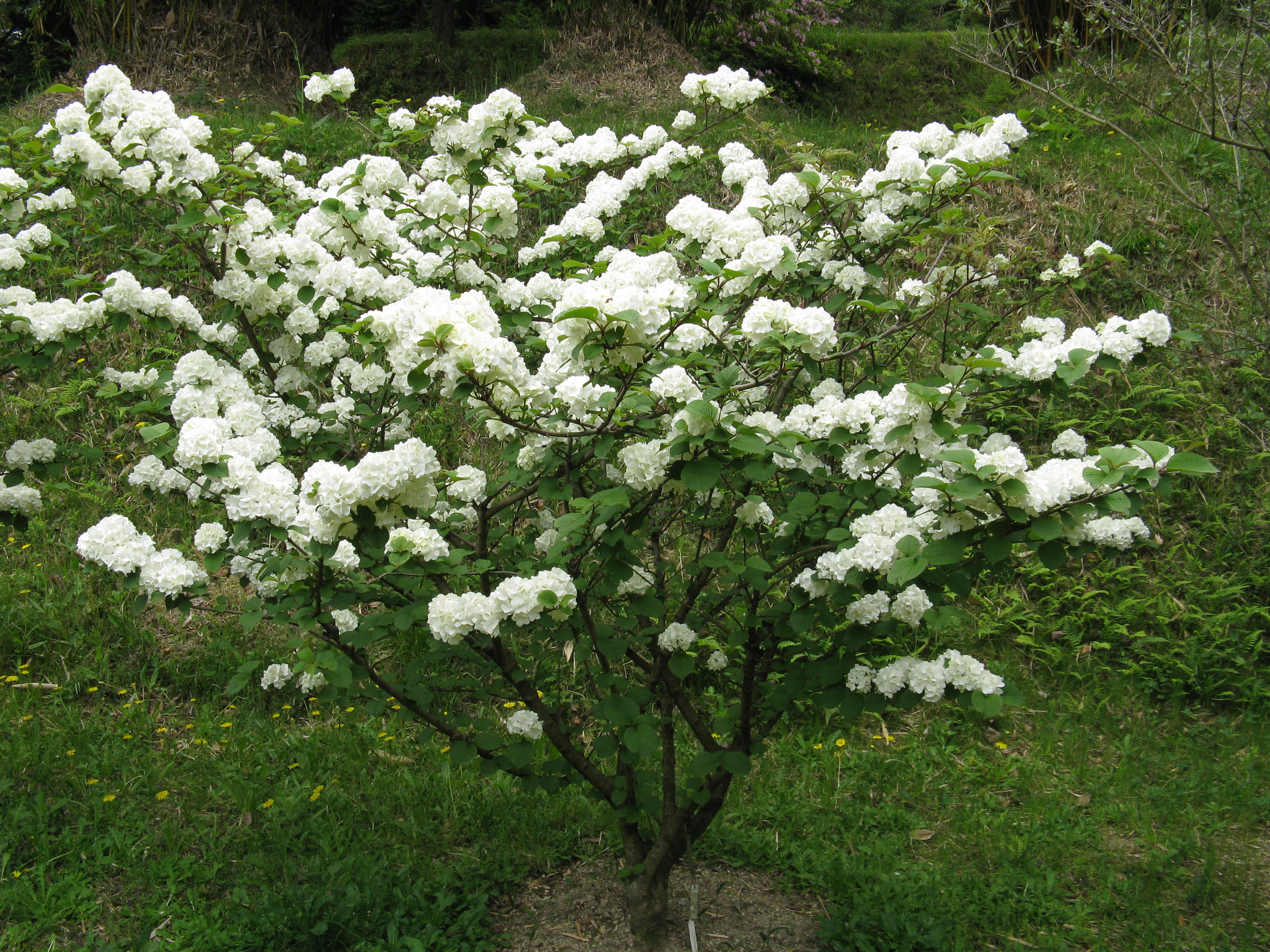
Viburnum plicatum var. plicatum

Many species of viburnum have become popular as garden or landscape plants because of their showy flowers and berries, fragrance, and good autumn colour of some forms. Some popular species, hybrids, and cultivars include:

- The hybrid Viburnum × bodnantense (V. farreri × V. grandiflorum) is particularly popular for its strongly scented pink flowers on the leafless deciduous shoots in mid- to late winter.
- Viburnum × burkwoodii (V. carlesii × V. utile)
- Viburnum × carlcephalum (V. carlesii × V. macrocephalum)
- Viburnum carlesii has round white flowerheads, strong fragrance, dense structure, and reddish leaves in autumn.
- Viburnum davidii is an evergreen species from China with blue fruit.
- Viburnum dentatum has flat-topped flowers, bluish fruit, and reddish leaves in autumn. It is somewhat salt-tolerant. The cultivar 'Blue Muffin' is more compact than the species and has fruit that is a deeper blue than the species.
- Viburnum dilatatum has flat-topped flowers, reddish leaves in autumn, and bright red fruit that persist into winter.
- Viburnum × jackii – Jack's viburnum
- Viburnum × juddii (V. bitchiuense × V. carlesii)
- Viburnum plicatum has white flowers, textured leaves, reddish-black fruit, and can grow quite large under ideal conditions. The species can tolerate shade, but not drought.
- Viburnum × pragense (V. rhytidophyllum × V. utile)
- Viburnum × rhytidophylloides (V. lantana × V. rhytidophyllum)popular evergreen shrub, drought resistant. Shiny green leaves, white flowers.
- Viburnum rhytidophyllum is a popular evergreen species, grown mainly for its foliage effect of large, dark green, leathery leaves with a strongly wrinkled surface. This is the parent species of two popular hybrid cultivars known as 'Alleghany' and 'Pragense'. 'Alleghany' was selected from a hybrid between V. rhytidophyllum and V. lantana 'Mohican' (in 1958, at the US National Arboretum).
- Viburnum setigerum has upright, coarse structure and orange to reddish-orange fruit.
- Viburnum sieboldii has a coarse, open structure, flat-topped flowers, reddish-black fruit, and can grow as a small tree.
- Viburnum tinus is a widely grown garden and landscape shrub.

The cultivars 'Pragense' and 'Eskimo', of mixed or uncertain parentage, have won the Royal Horticultural Society's Award of Garden Merit.

=== Other uses ===
In prehistory, the long, straight shoots of some viburnums were used for arrow-shafts, as those found with Ötzi the Iceman.

The fruit of some species (e.g., V. lentago) is edible and can be eaten either raw or for making jam. In contrast, other species (e.g., V. opulus) are mildly toxic and can cause vomiting if eaten in quantity.

The bark of some species is used in herbal medicine, as an antispasmodic and to treat asthma.

=== Cultural references ===
In Ukraine, Viburnum opulus is an essential element of traditional folk culture, and Viburnum opulus (kalyna) is seen as a national symbol and emblem for both the Koliada festivities, as well as representing young girls' love and tenderness. It is a key element of Ukrainian traditional wreaths. Many folk songs are dedicated to the kalyna, as well as a very popular song "Oi u Luzi Chervona Kalina".

The Lithuanian name for the genus Viburnum is "Putinas". This was the pen name of Lithuanian poet and writer Vincas Mykolaitis. In 2000, the Lithuanian liquor company Alita released a vodka named Putin Vodka, with a red, white, and blue label, which are the colours of the Russian flag. Sold only in Lithuania at that time, a company spokesperson said that the name had its origin in the tree "putinas", after speculation arose that it was named after Russian president Vladimir Putin.
