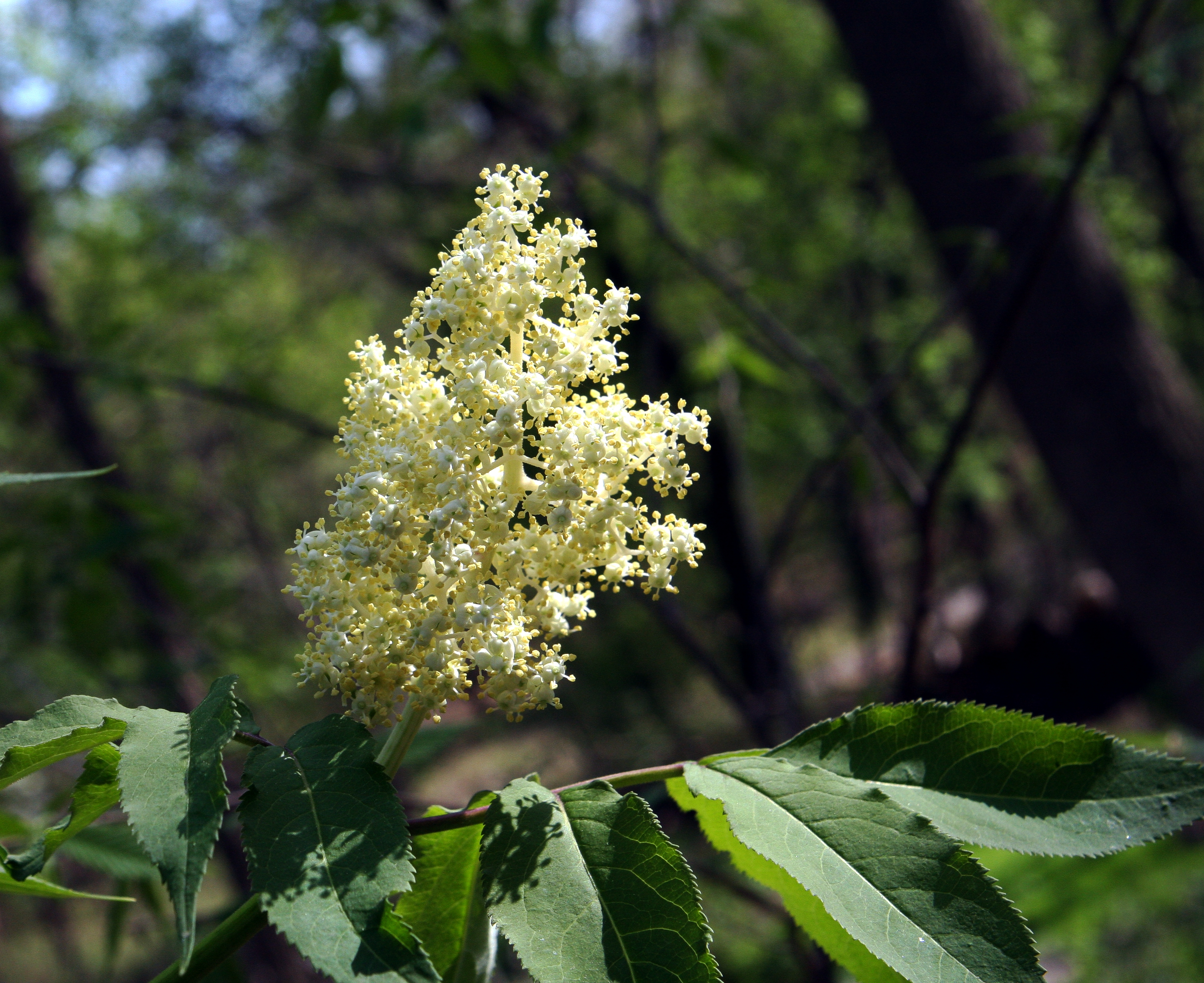
- Flowers in May

Scientific classification
- Kingdom: Plantae
- Clade: Tracheophytes
- Clade: Angiosperms
- Clade: Eudicots
- Clade: Asterids
- Order: Dipsacales
- Family: Viburnaceae
- Genus: Sambucus
- Species: S. racemosa
- Subspecies: S. r. subsp. pubens

Trinomial name
- Sambucus racemosa subsp. pubens (Michx.) Hultén

Synonyms
- Homotypic synonyms: Sambucus montana Prov.; Sambucus pubens Michx.; Sambucus racemosa pubens (Michx.) House; Sambucus racemosa var. pubens (Michx.) Trautv. & C.A.Mey.; Sambucus racemosa f. pubens (Michx.) Regel; Heterotypic synonyms: Sambucus montana var. arborescens Prov.; Sambucus arborescens Nutt.; Sambucus callicarpa Greene; Sambucus dimidiata Raf.; Sambucus leiosperma Leiberg; Sambucus microbotrys xanthocarpa (Cockerell) Cockerell; Sambucus pubens f. albicocca (Britton ex Millsp.) Britton ex Millsp.; Sambucus pubens var. arborescens Torr. & A.Gray; Sambucus pubens f. calva Fernald; Sambucus pubens f. dimidiata Schwer.; Sambucus pubens f. dissecta (Britton) Schwer.; Sambucus pubens var. dissecta Britton; Sambucus pubens var. heptaphylla G.Don; Sambucus pubens f. leucocarpa (Torr. & A.Gray) Schwer.; Sambucus pubens var. leucocarpa Torr. & A.Gray; Sambucus pubens var. pubescens Schwer.; Sambucus pubens f. rosiflora (Carrière) Dans.; Sambucus pubens var. rosiflora (Carrière) Zabel; Sambucus pubens var. spectabilis Zabel; Sambucus pubens f. verrucosa Schwer.; Sambucus pubens var. xanthocarpa (Cockerell) Nieuwl.; Sambucus pubens f. xanthocarpa (Cockerell) Fernald; Sambucus pubescens Pers.; Sambucus pubescens f. dimidiata Schwer.; Sambucus pubescens var. heptaphylla (G.Don) Hook. ex Mouill.; Sambucus racemosa f. albicocca Britton ex Millsp.; Sambucus racemosa subsp. arborescens (Torr. & A.Gray) A.E.Murray; Sambucus racemosa var. arborescens (Torr. & A.Gray) A.Gray; Sambucus racemosa var. callicarpa (Greene) Jeps.; Sambucus racemosa f. calva (Fernald) Scoggan; Sambucus racemosa f. chrysocarpa Eames & R.K.Godfrey; Sambucus racemosa f. dissecta (Britton) Scoggan; Sambucus racemosa f. leucocarpa (Torr. & A.Gray) House; Sambucus racemosa var. leucocarpa (Torr. & A.Gray) Cronquist; Sambucus racemosa f. oinocarpa Cockerell; Sambucus racemosa var. pubescens (Pers.) Dippel; Sambucus racemosa f. rosiflora (Carrière) Voss; Sambucus racemosa var. rosiflora (Carrière) Dippel; Sambucus racemosa f. xanthocarpa Cockerell; Sambucus rosiflora Carrière; Sambucus rupestris Raf.; Sambucus verrucosa Raf.

= Sambucus racemosa subsp. pubens =

Subspecies of flowering plant

Sambucus racemosa subsp. pubens, commonly known as red elderberry or American red elderberry, is a subspecies of Sambucus racemosa, the latter being a species of shrub in the moschatel family Viburnaceae. The subspecies is native to North America. It typically produces small white flowers and bright red fruits. In western North America, a variety of the subspecies with purple-black fruits is called the Rocky Mountain elder. Some authors consider the subspecies to be a distinct species while others consider it to be indistinct from the Eurasian taxon Sambucus racemosa subsp. racemosa.

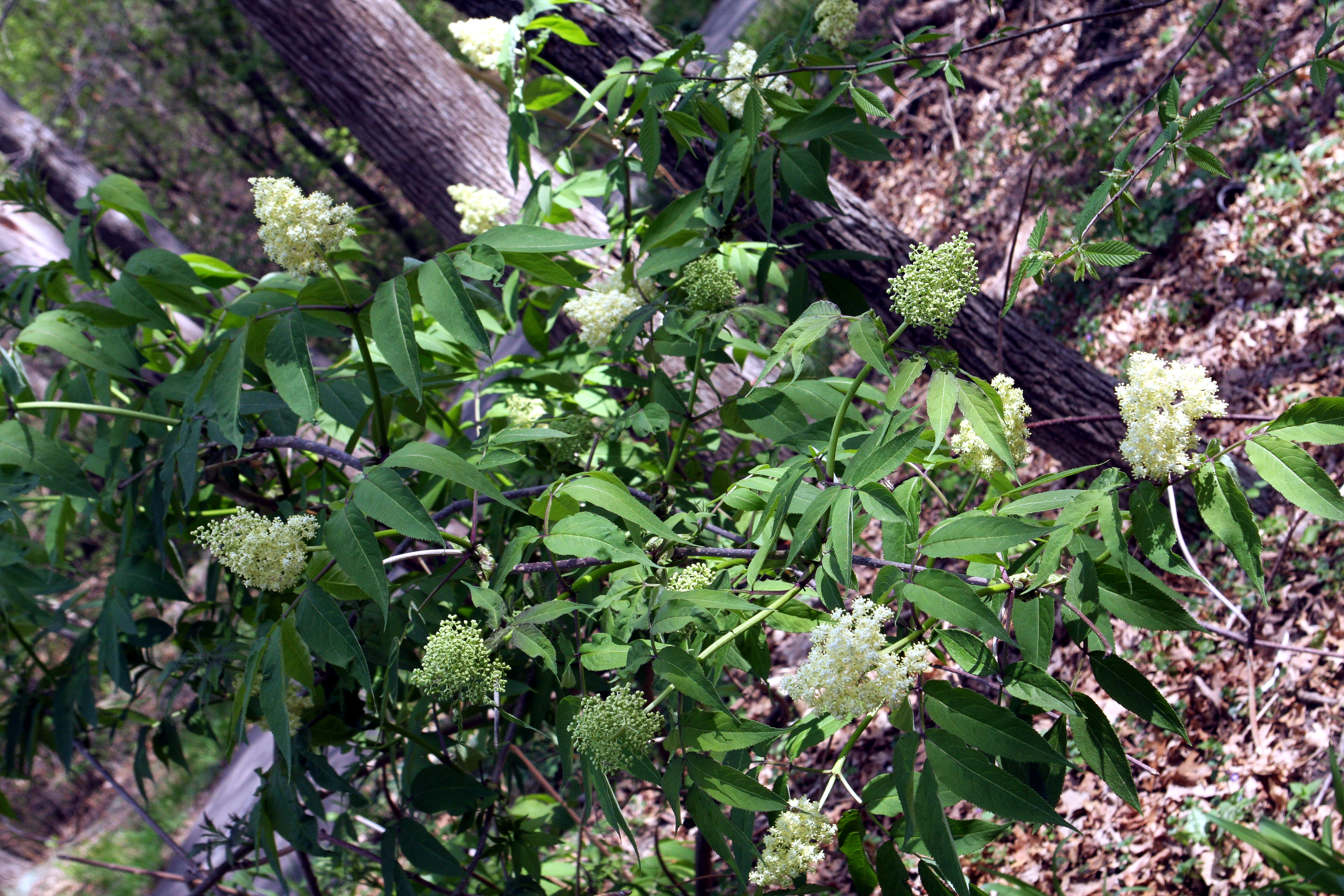
Flowers and flower buds in May

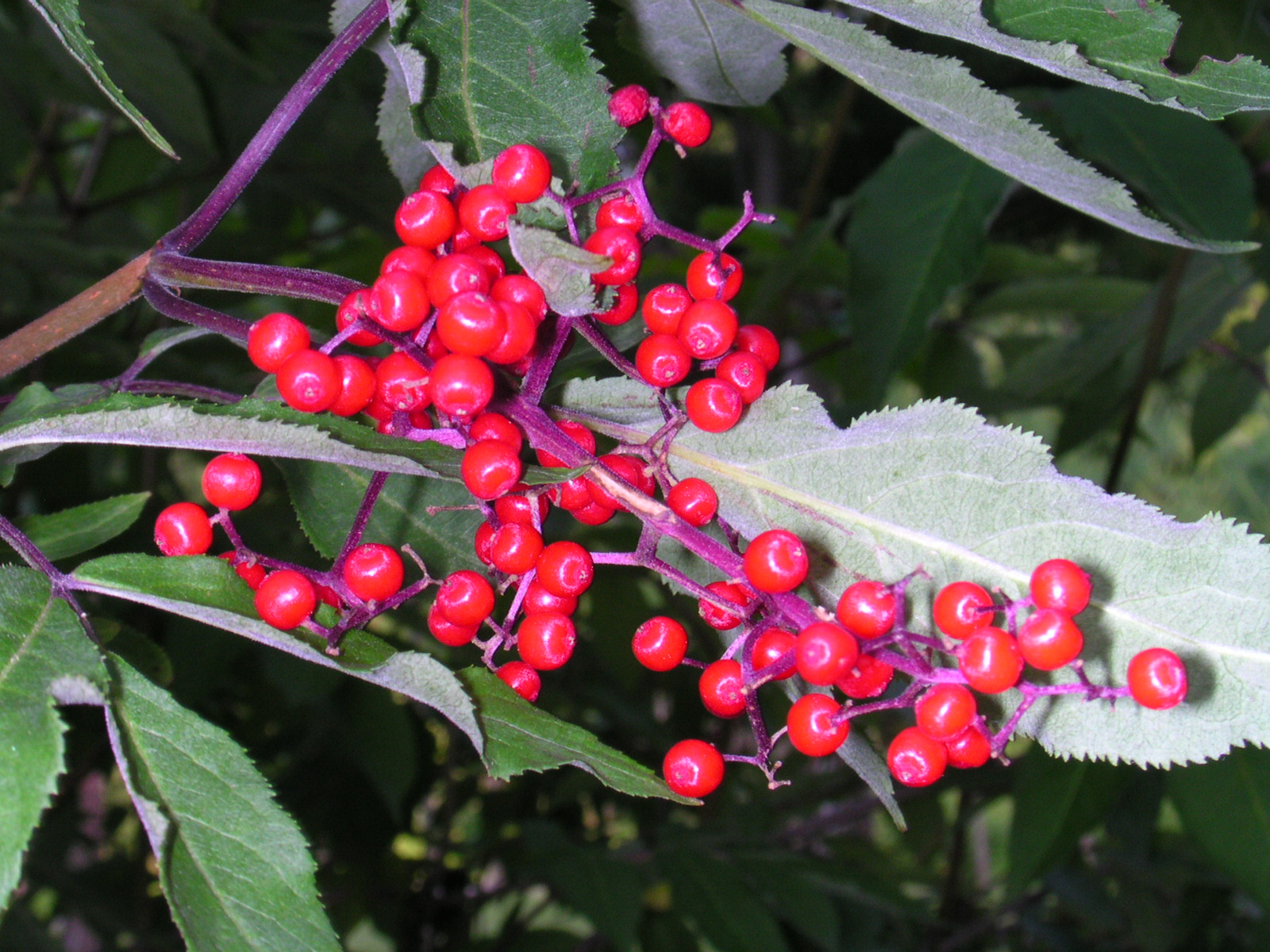
Typical red fruits in Superior National Forest (U.S.) in July

Fruits of variety melanocarpa in Glacier National Park (U.S.) in August

== Taxonomy ==
Sambucus racemosa subsp. pubens was first described as Sambucus pubens by the French botanist André Michaux in 1803. Michaux based his diagnosis on specimens collected in the mountains of Pennsylvania, as well as Canada and the Carolinas. The Swedish botanist Eric Hultén reduced the species to a subspecies in 1937. As of October 2026, the name Sambucus pubens Michx. is considered to be a homotypic synonym of Sambucus racemosa subsp. pubens (Michx.) Hultén.

Some name authorities consider the North American taxon to be indistinct from the Eurasian taxon, in which case one of the names Sambucus racemosa subsp. racemosa or S. r. var. racemosa is accepted. These authorities commonly refer to the taxon as "red elderberry". Authorities that recognize two distinct taxa sometimes refer to "American red elderberry".

=== Synonyms ===
Sambucus racemosa subsp. pubens has dozens of synonyms. Of these, two names are accepted by both Plants of the World Online (POWO) and World Flora Online (WFO):

- Sambucus racemosa var. melanocarpa (A.Gray) McMinn
- Sambucus racemosa var. microbotrys (Rydb.) Kearney & Peebles

Sambucus racemosa var. melanocarpa was first described as Sambucus melanocarpa by the American botanist Asa Gray in 1883. Gray noted the taxon's close resemblance to Sambucus canadensis, which at the time was giving botanists "some trouble". The American botanist Howard Earnest McMinn reduced the species to a variety in 1939. Unlike the typical variety, var. melanocarpa has distinctive purple-black fruits. The name Sambucus racemosa var. melanocarpa (A.Gray) McMinn, also known as the "Rocky Mountain elder", is widely accepted. Some authorities accept the name Sambucus melanocarpa A.Gray instead.

Sambucus racemosa var. microbotrys was first described as Sambucus microbotrys by the American botanist Per Axel Rydberg in 1901. Rydberg based his description on numerous specimens collected in the mountains of Colorado. In 1939, the American botanists Thomas Henry Kearney and Robert Hibbs Peebles reduced the species to a variety. Based on these early descriptions, the only consistent character that differentiates the typical variety from var. microbotrys is the latter's total lack of pubescence. The name Sambucus racemosa var. microbotrys (Rydb.) Kearney & Peebles is accepted by both POWO and WFO, and by various authorities in the Rocky Mountain region. Some authorities consider the latter name to be a synonym for Sambucus racemosa L. sensu lato.

== Distribution and habitat ==
Sambucus racemosa subsp. pubens is native to the temperate regions of North America. Its range extends northward to the subarctic regions of Alaska, Aleutian Islands, and Yukon, but it is absent from the Arctic, the Great Plains, and most of the Southeastern United States except the Appalachian Mountains. It was introduced into Bolivia, Great Britain, and southern New Zealand.

Sambucus racemosa var. melanocarpa is native to the Western United States and Western Canada, including the Rocky Mountains and Sierra Nevada. Sambucus racemosa var. microbotrys is native to the Southwestern United States.

== Uses ==
The red berries are an important food source for many birds. They have a bitter taste and can cause digestive problems if eaten in large quantities by humans.

== Bibliography ==
- Gray, Asa (30 October 1883). "Contributions to North American botany". Proceedings of the American Academy of Arts and Sciences. 19: 1–96.
- Kearney, Thomas H.; Peebles, Robert H. (November 1939). "Arizona plants: New species, varieties, and combinations". Journal of the Washington Academy of Sciences. 29 (11). Baltimore, MD: 474–492.
- Larson, Jill; Reif, Brian; Nelson, B. E.; Hartman, Ronald L. (2014). "Floristic studies in North Central New Mexico, U.S.A.: The Sangre de Cristo mountains". Journal of the Botanical Research Institute of Texas. 8 (1). Fort Worth: 271–303.
- Michaux, André (1803). Flora Boreali-Americana. Vol. 1. Paris: Apud fratres Levrault (The Levrault Brothers).
- Rydberg, Per Axel (September 1901). "Studies on the Rocky Mountain Flora VI". Bulletin of the Torrey Botanical Club. 28 (9). New York: 499–513.
