= Adoxa omeiensis =

Conservation status
- Endangered (IUCN 3.1)

Scientific classification
- Kingdom: Plantae
- Clade: Embryophytes
- Clade: Tracheophytes
- Clade: Spermatophytes
- Clade: Angiosperms
- Clade: Eudicots
- Clade: Asterids
- Order: Dipsacales
- Family: Viburnaceae
- Genus: Adoxa
- Species: A. omeiensis

Binomial name
- Adoxa omeiensis H.Hara

Synonyms
- Tetradoxa omeiensis (H.Hara) C.Y.Wu

Genus of plants

Adoxa omeiensis is a species of flowering plant in the family Viburnaceae. It is a rhizomatous geophyte endemic to Sichuan Province in south-central China. Some authorities place it in the monotypic genus Tetradoxa as Tetradoxa omeiensis.

This species has a stem 10 to 20 centimeters long with a few basal leaves and one pair of oppositely arranged stem leaves. It produces an inflorescence of 3 to 5 yellow-green flowers.

The species was first described by Hiroshi Hara in 1981.
