= Potter's Carr, Cranworth =

Protected area in Norfolk, England

Coordinates: 52.598°N 0.922°E

- Site of Special Scientific Interest
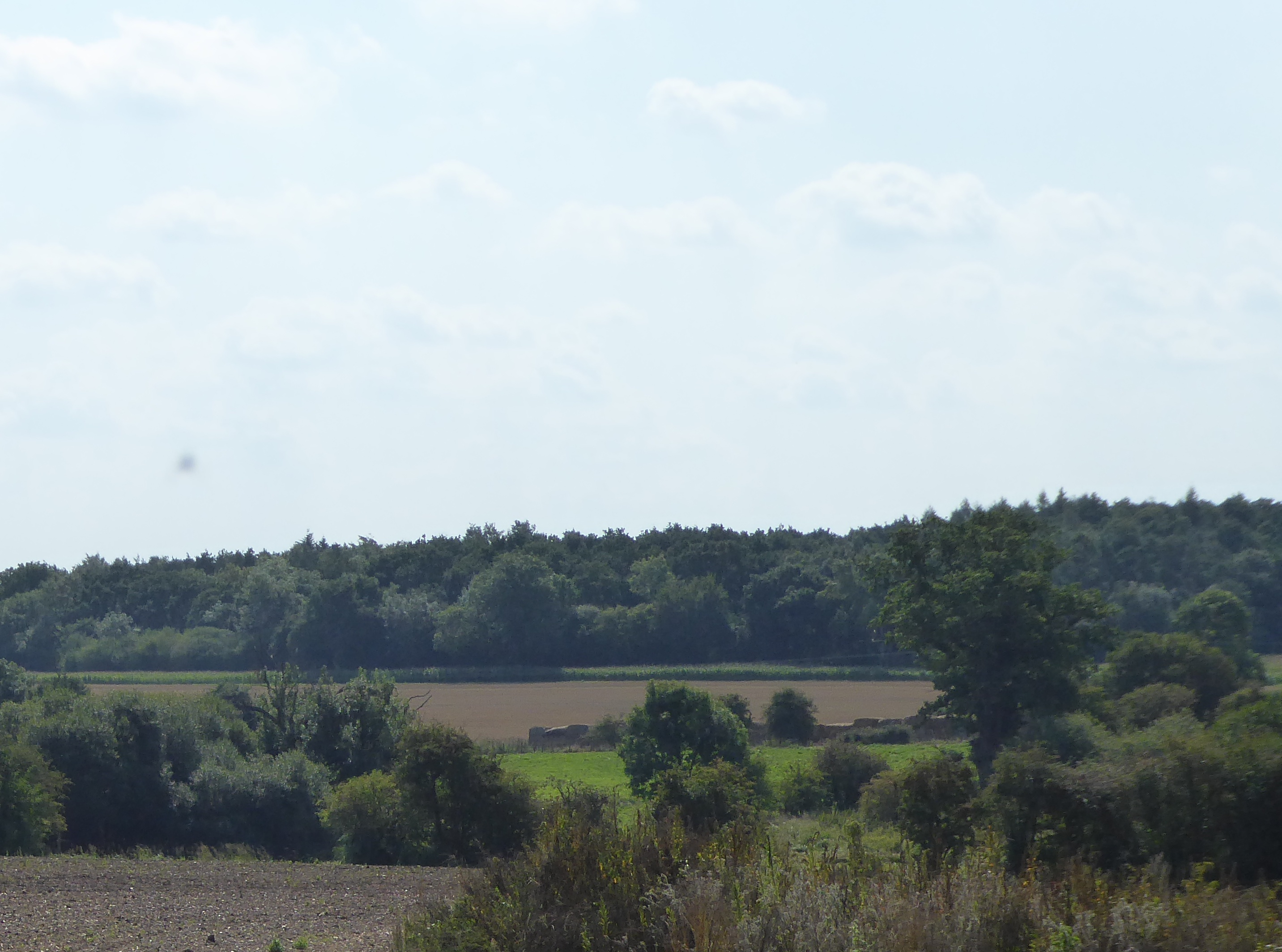
- Location of Potter's Carr, Cranworth.
- Area of search: Norfolk
- Grid reference: TF 980 040
- Interest: Biological
- Area: 6.3 hectares (16 acres)
- Notification date: 1986
- Location map: Magic Map

Potter's Carr, Cranworth is a 6.3-hectare (16-acre) biological Site of Special Scientific Interest south of Dereham in Norfolk, England.

This area of alder carr and wet pasture is on the bank of the River Blackwater. The diverse flora of the carr is typical of ancient woodland, with plants such as dog's mercury and moschatel. Wintering birds include water rails.

The site is private land with no public access.
