= Fifehead Wood =

English woodland

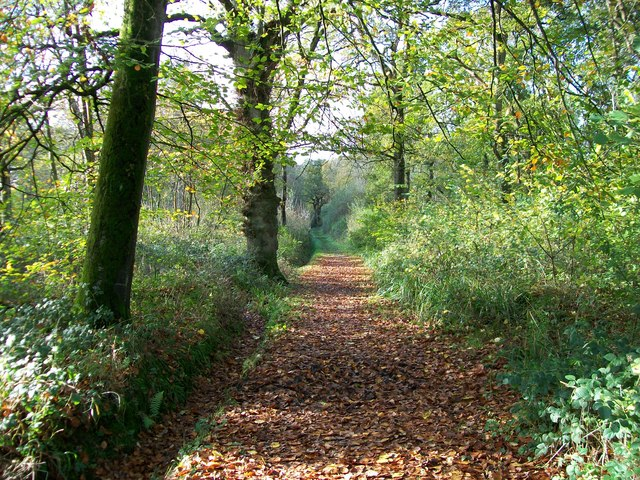
- In Fifehead Wood

- Location within Dorset
- Interactive map of Fifehead Wood

Geography
- Location: Dorset, England
- OS grid: ST773215
- Coordinates: 50.992°N 2.324°W
- Area: 20.36 hectares (50.31 acres)

Administration
- Authority: Woodland Trust

Fifehead Wood is a woodland in Dorset, England, near the village of Fifehead Magdalen. Owned and maintained by the Woodland Trust, Fifehead Wood covers a total area of 20.36 hectares (50.31 acres), and is situated upon a ridge of Corallian Limestone within the depths of Blackmoor Vale. The name 'Fifehead' is thought to originate with an assessment made during the Domesday census of 1086, the village at that time comprising 'five hides' of land.

== Ecosystem ==
Flora such as the musky-smelling helmet flower (Anemone nemorosa), the five-faced bishop (Adoxa), the early purple orchid (Orchis mascula), and the yellow pimpernel (Lysimachia nemorum) grow within Fifehead Wood, while bluebell carpets appear each spring.

Maps produced by the Ordnance Survey from 1805 to 1811 reveal that Fifehead Wood has remained substantially unchanged for over two centuries. The woodland is therefore classed as 'Ancient Semi-Natural', and has been designated a Site of Nature Conservation Interest. The trees living at Fifehead are predominantly broad-leaved like the English oak (Quercus robur), field maple (Acer campestre) and common ash (Fraxinus excelsior). Mercurialis perennis (commonly known as dog's mercury), blackberry (Rubus fruticosus), common bracken (Pteridium aquilinum), and honeysuckle (Lonicera periclymenum) make up most of the understorey. Hazel (Corylus) has been regularly coppiced here over the years — this ancient practice still continues (although on a much smaller scale than previously), chiefly to preserve the existing habitat. In the past, the tenants of Fifehead would have been required to pay duty to the lord of the manor in numerous different ways. Maintenance and upkeep of the ditches and enclosures within the immediate area was the responsibility of those that inhabited it, and a steady supply of brushwood and timber from the wood was demanded.

Fifehead Wood provides the light orange underwing moth (Archiearis notha) with its sole Dorset residence. The site also has a large variety of butterflies, such as the white admiral (Limenitis camilla) and the purple hairstreak (Neozephyrus quercus). Breeding populations of several different birds inhabit Fifehead Wood. Grey heron and great spotted woodpeckers may be spotted, and treecreepers can also be observed spiraling within the habitat, as they ascend tree trunks in a progression of small hops.
