= Adoxa corydalifolia =

Conservation status
- Vulnerable (IUCN 3.1)

Scientific classification
- Kingdom: Plantae
- Clade: Tracheophytes
- Clade: Angiosperms
- Clade: Eudicots
- Clade: Asterids
- Order: Dipsacales
- Family: Viburnaceae
- Genus: Adoxa
- Species: A. corydalifolia

Binomial name
- Adoxa corydalifolia (C.Y.Wu, Z.L.Wu & R.F.Huang) Christenh. & Byng

Synonyms
- Sinadoxa corydalifolia C.Y.Wu, Z.L.Wu & R.F.Huang

Genus of plants

Adoxa corydalifolia is a species of flowering plant in the family Viburnaceae. It is a perennial endemic to the Hengduan Mountains of the Tibetan Plateau in southern Qinghai Province of China, where it grows in subalpine habitats.

It is a perennial herb growing from a fibrous root system with rhizomes. It produces one to four upright, green stems up to 25 centimeters tall and just a few millimeters wide. The basal leaves are pinnate, made up of leaflets which may be lobed or subdivided. There is usually one opposite pair of leaves higher on the stem, each with three leaflets. The inflorescence is a spike with interrupted clusters of 3 to 5 small, yellow-green to yellow-brown flowers. Flowering occurs in June and July.

Some authorities place the species in the monotypic genus Sinadoxa as Sinadoxa corydalifolia.
