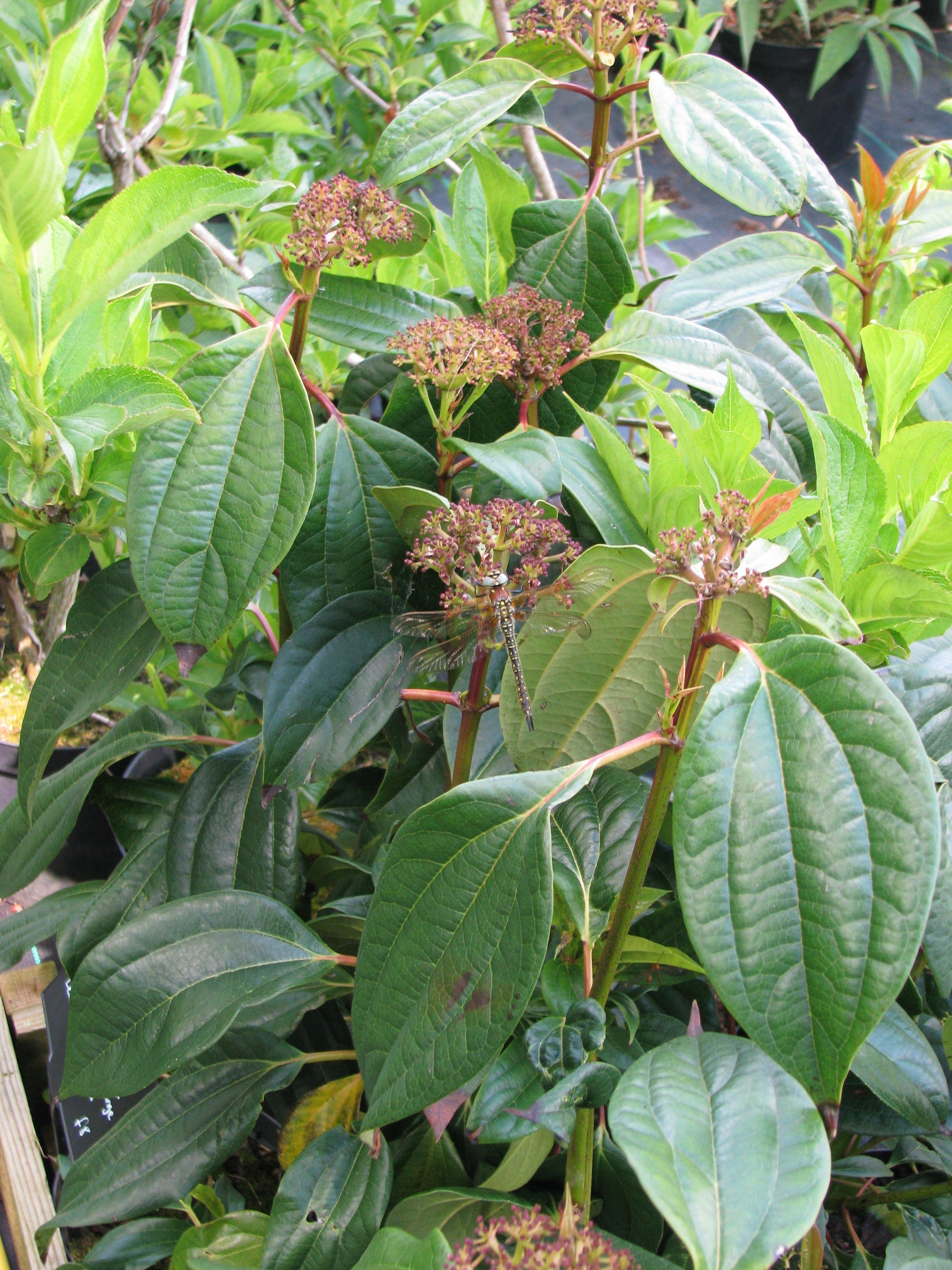

Scientific classification
- Kingdom: Plantae
- Clade: Tracheophytes
- Clade: Angiosperms
- Clade: Eudicots
- Clade: Asterids
- Order: Dipsacales
- Family: Viburnaceae
- Genus: Viburnum
- Species: V. cinnamomifolium

Binomial name
- Viburnum cinnamomifolium Rehder

= Viburnum cinnamomifolium =

Species of flowering plant

Viburnum cinnamomifolium, the cinnamon-leaved viburnum, is a species of flowering plant in the family Adoxaceae, native to western China. Growing to 5 m (16 ft) tall and broad, it is a substantial evergreen shrub with large, triple-veined, glossy, oval leaves up to 15 cm (6 in) long. Round clusters of tiny white flowers are produced in late spring, followed in late summer and autumn by oval dark blue fruit.

It is very similar to Viburnum davidii, differing only in the slightly thinner and less wrinkled but longer leaves, and smaller fruit (3 mm diameter, versus 4.5 mm in V. davidii).

The Latin specific epithet cinnamomifolium means "with leaves like cinnamon", and refers to the similarly three-veined leaves of certain species of cinnamon plant.

This plant has gained the Royal Horticultural Society's Award of Garden Merit.
