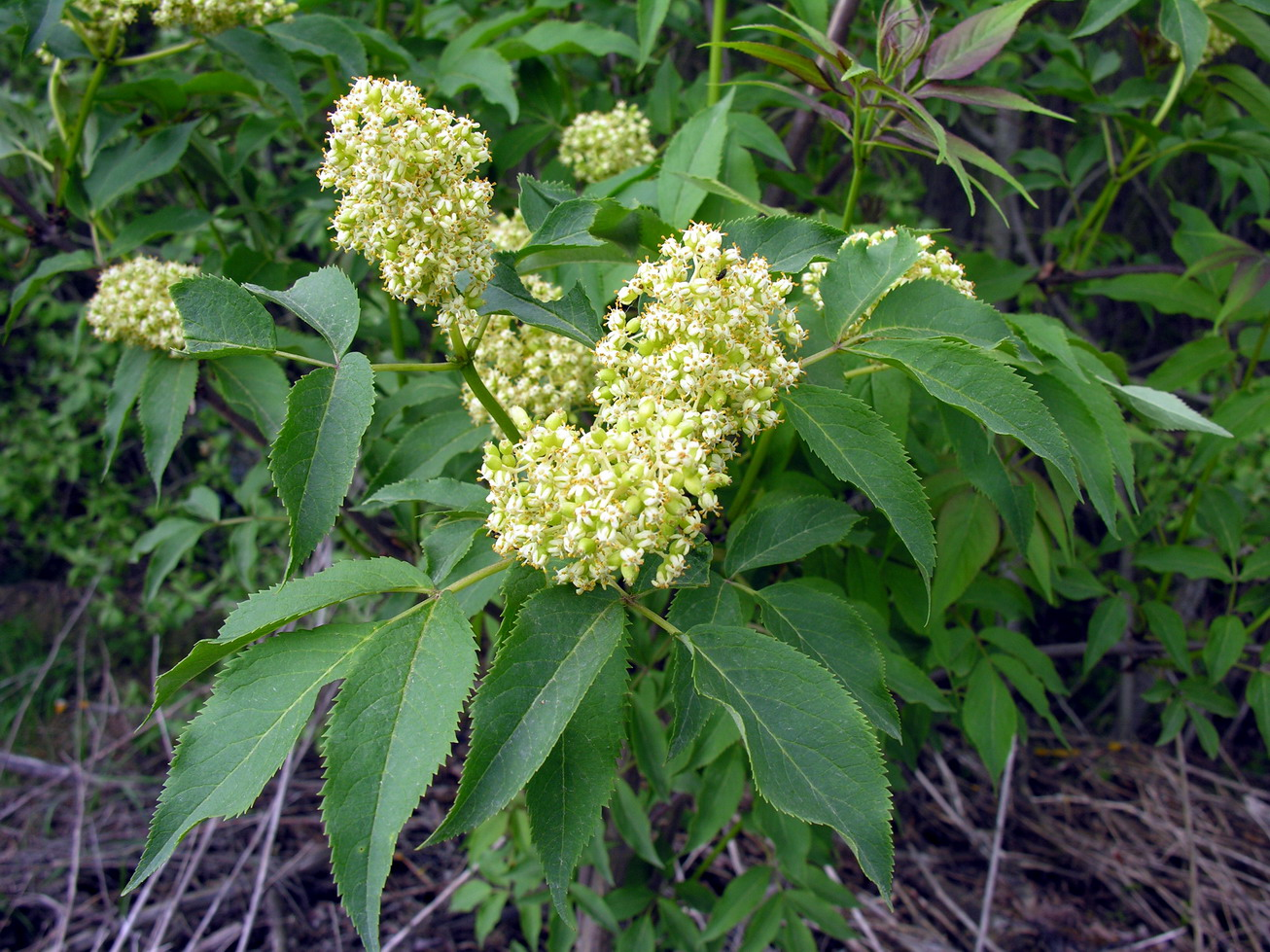
- Flowers of subspecies racemosa in Lithuania

Scientific classification
- Kingdom: Plantae
- Clade: Tracheophytes
- Clade: Angiosperms
- Clade: Eudicots
- Clade: Asterids
- Order: Dipsacales
- Family: Viburnaceae
- Genus: Sambucus
- Species: S. racemosa

Binomial name
- Sambucus racemosa L.

Subspecies
- Sambucus racemosa subsp. pubens (Michx.) Hultén; Sambucus racemosa subsp. racemosa

= Sambucus racemosa =

Species of flowering plant

Sambucus racemosa, also known as red-berried elder or red elderberry, is a species of shrub in the moschatel family Viburnaceae. It is native across much of the Northern Hemisphere. It produces distinctive red fruits. The plant is largely poisonous if eaten raw but the fruit can be cooked for consumption.

== Description ==
Sambucus racemosa is medium-sized shrub growing 2–4 m (7–13 ft) (rarely 6 m (20 ft)) tall. The stems are soft, with a broad pith.

Each individual leaf is composed of 5 to 7 leaflike leaflets, each of which is up to 4–8 cm (1 1/2–3 1/4 in) (rarely to 16 cm (6 1/4 in)) long, lance-shaped to narrowly oval, and irregularly serrated along the edges. The leaflets have a strong disagreeable scent when crushed.

The inflorescence is a vaguely cone-shaped panicle 3–6 cm (1 1/4–2 1/4 in) diameter, consisting of several cymes of flowers and produced on the ends of stem branches. The flower buds are pink when closed, and the open flowers are white, cream, or yellowish. Each flower has small, recurved petals and a star-shaped axis of five white stamens tipped in yellow anthers. The flowers are fragrant and visited by flies (particularly hoverflies), hummingbirds and butterflies.

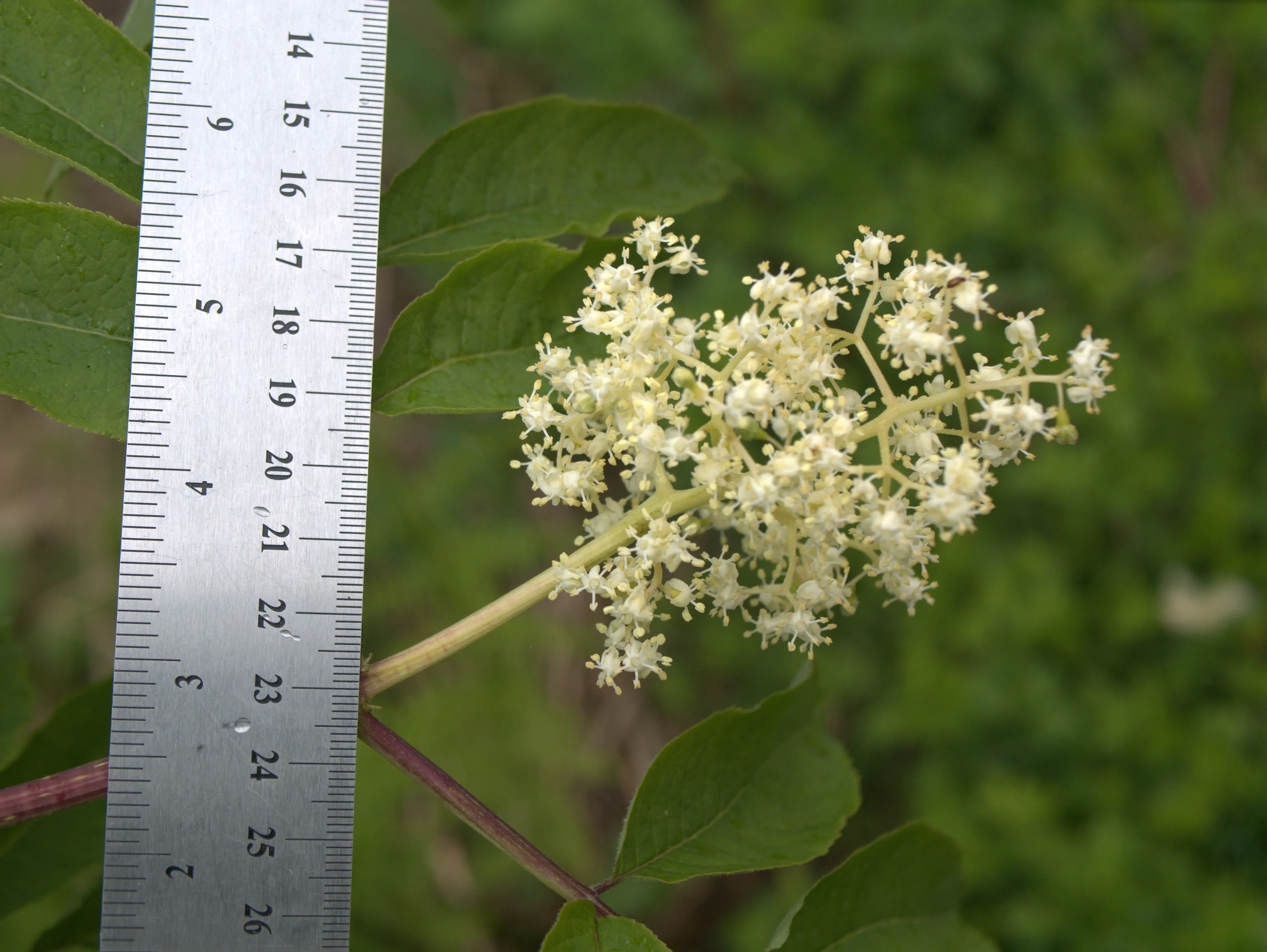
Flowers of subspecies pubens in British Columbia in May

The fruit is a bright red drupe (to purple-black in variety melanocarpa) containing 3 to 5 seeds. It is eaten by birds, which disperse the seeds in their droppings. Its fruit persists for an average of 42.5 days, and bears an average of 3.0 seeds per fruit. Fruits average 88.0% water, and their dry weight includes 8.3% carbohydrates and 9.0% lipids, which is one of the highest lipid values among European fleshy fruits.

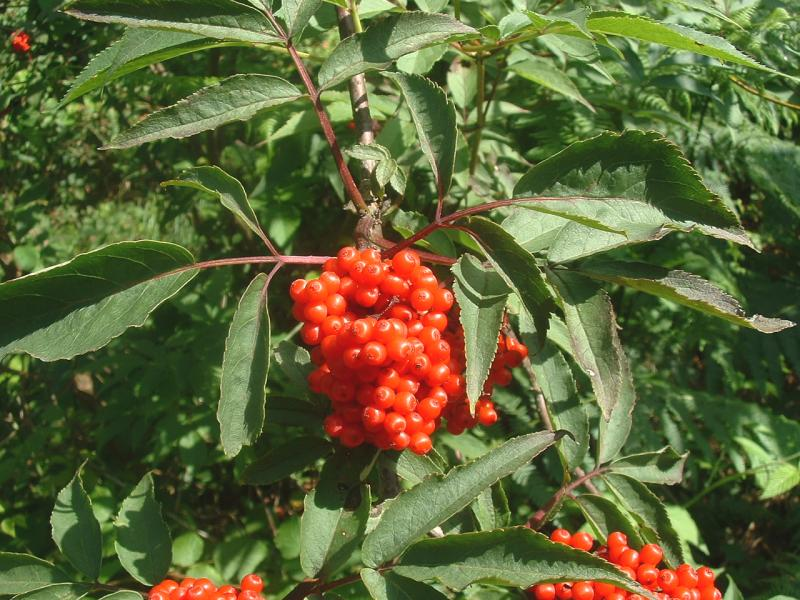
Fruit of subspecies racemosa in France

== Taxonomy ==
Sambucus racemosa was named and described by the Swedish botanist Carl Linnaeus in 1753. Linnaeus based his diagnosis on a specimen collected in the mountains of southern Europe.

=== Subspecies ===
As of November 2026, the following infraspecific names are accepted:

- Sambucus racemosa subsp. pubens (Michx.) Hultén
  - Sambucus racemosa var. melanocarpa (A.Gray) McMinn
  - Sambucus racemosa var. microbotrys (Rydb.) Kearney & Peebles
- Sambucus racemosa subsp. racemosa

Other subspecies include:

- Sambucus racemosa subsp. kamtschatica (now Sambucus kamtschatica)
- Sambucus racemosa subsp. sibirica (now Sambucus sibirica)
- Sambucus racemosa subsp. sieboldiana (now Sambucus sieboldiana)

== Distribution and habitat ==
Sambucus racemosa is native to Europe, northern temperate Asia, and North America across Canada and the United States. It grows in riparian environments, woodlands, and other habitats, generally in moist areas.

== Cultivation ==
Sambucus racemosa is cultivated as an ornamental plant, for use as a shrub or small tree in traditional and wildlife gardens, and natural landscape design projects. The yellow-foliaged cultivars 'Plumosa Aurea' and 'Sutherland Gold' are widely grown in Britain.

=== Cultivars ===
Cultivars in the nursery trade include:

- Sambucus racemosa 'SMNSRD4' Lemony Lace® — golden green foliage, with red new growth
- Sambucus racemosa 'Sutherland Gold' — green foliage, with bronze new growth: it has received the Royal Horticultural Society's Award of Garden Merit.

== Toxicity ==
The stems, roots and foliage are poisonous, and the fruit can be toxic or cause nausea if eaten raw.

== Uses ==
Although potentially poisonous when raw, the berries are reportedly safe to eat when cooked. They were cooked in a variety of recipes by indigenous peoples. The plant has been used as a traditional medicine by North American aboriginal people. The Ahousaht use the timing of red elderberry bloom as an indicator to begin halibut fishing and hunting of gray whales and harbor seals.

== Images ==
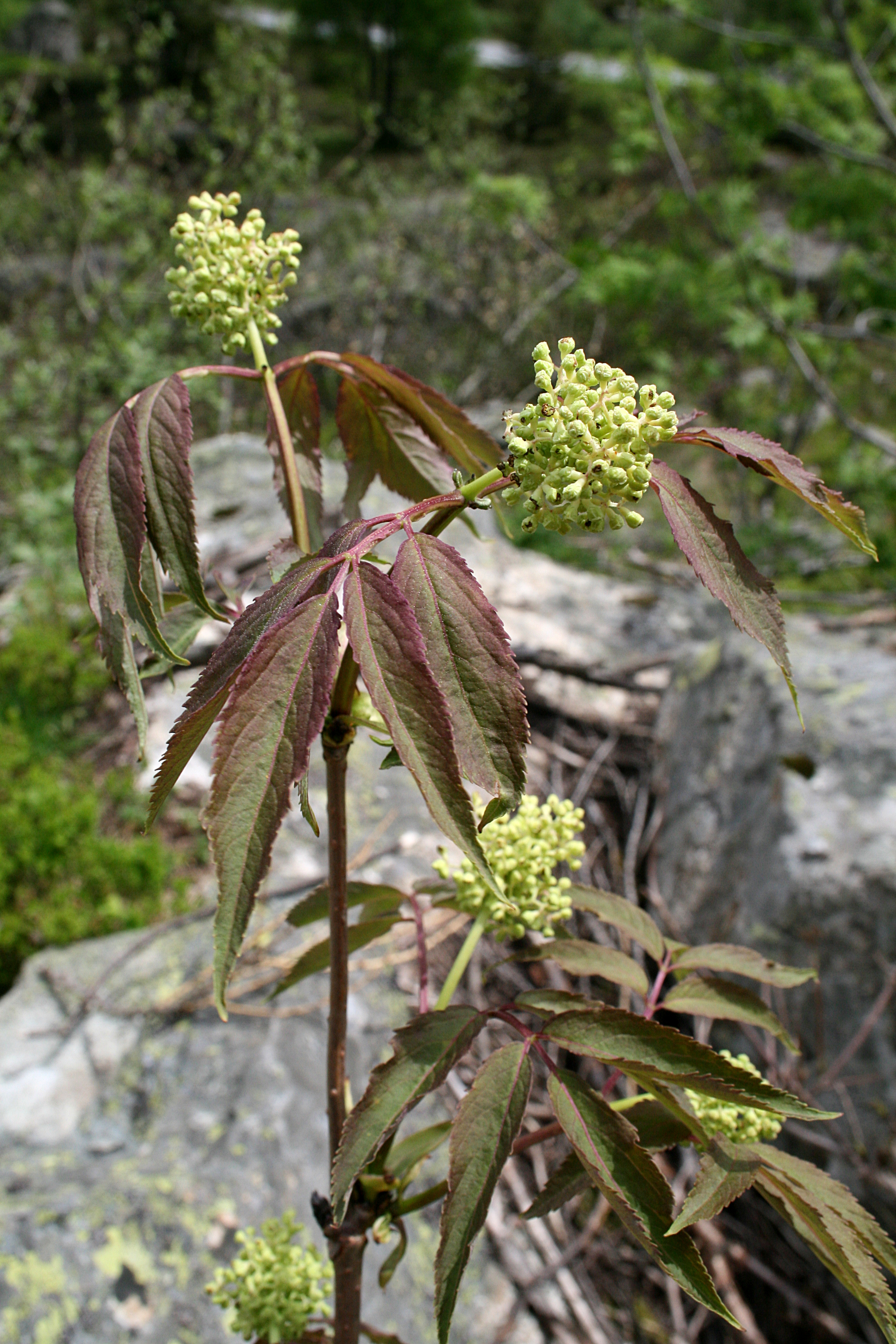
Young leaves and flower buds of Sambucus racemosa subspecies racemosa

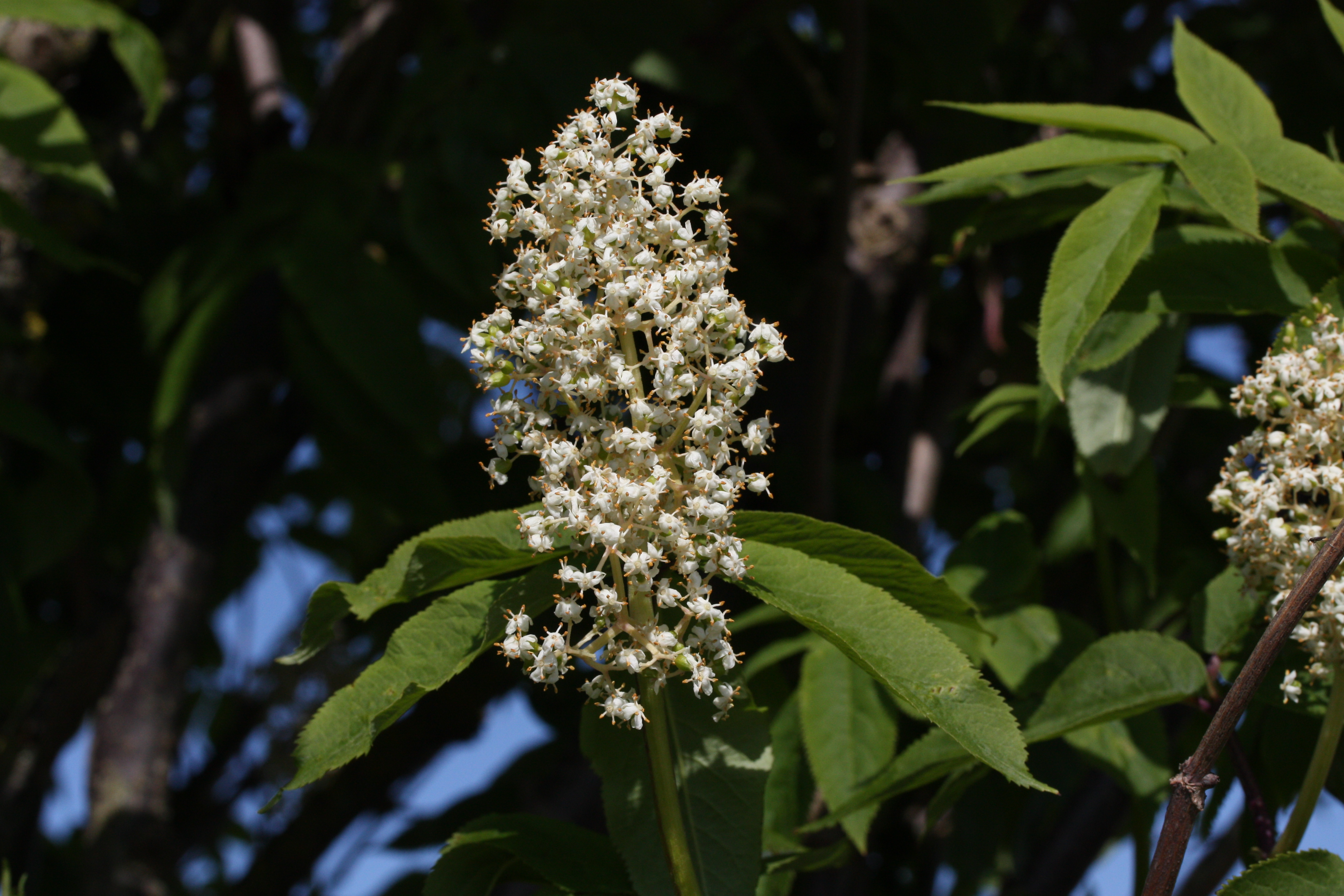
Inflorescence and foliage of Sambucus racemosa subspecies pubens

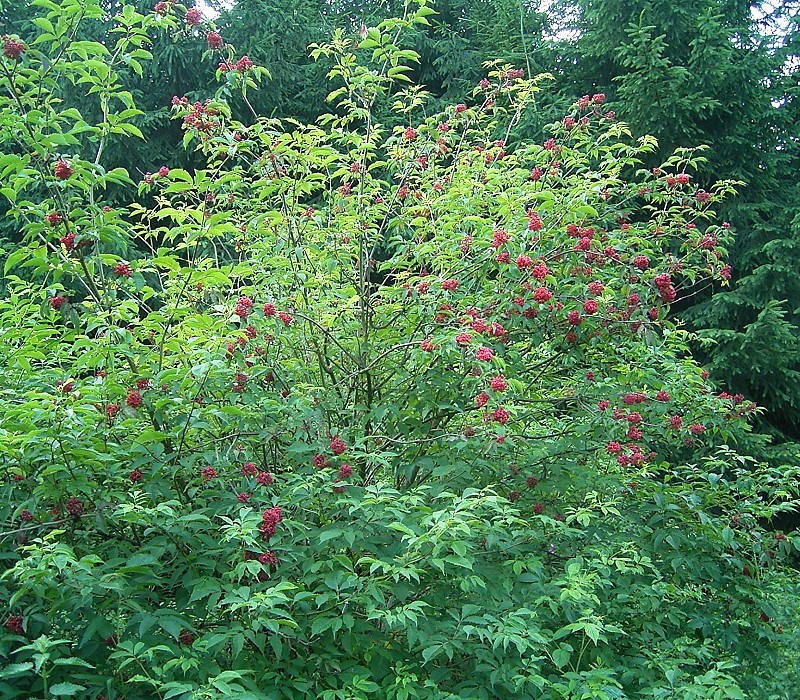
Clusters of berries of Sambucus racemosa subspecies racemosa

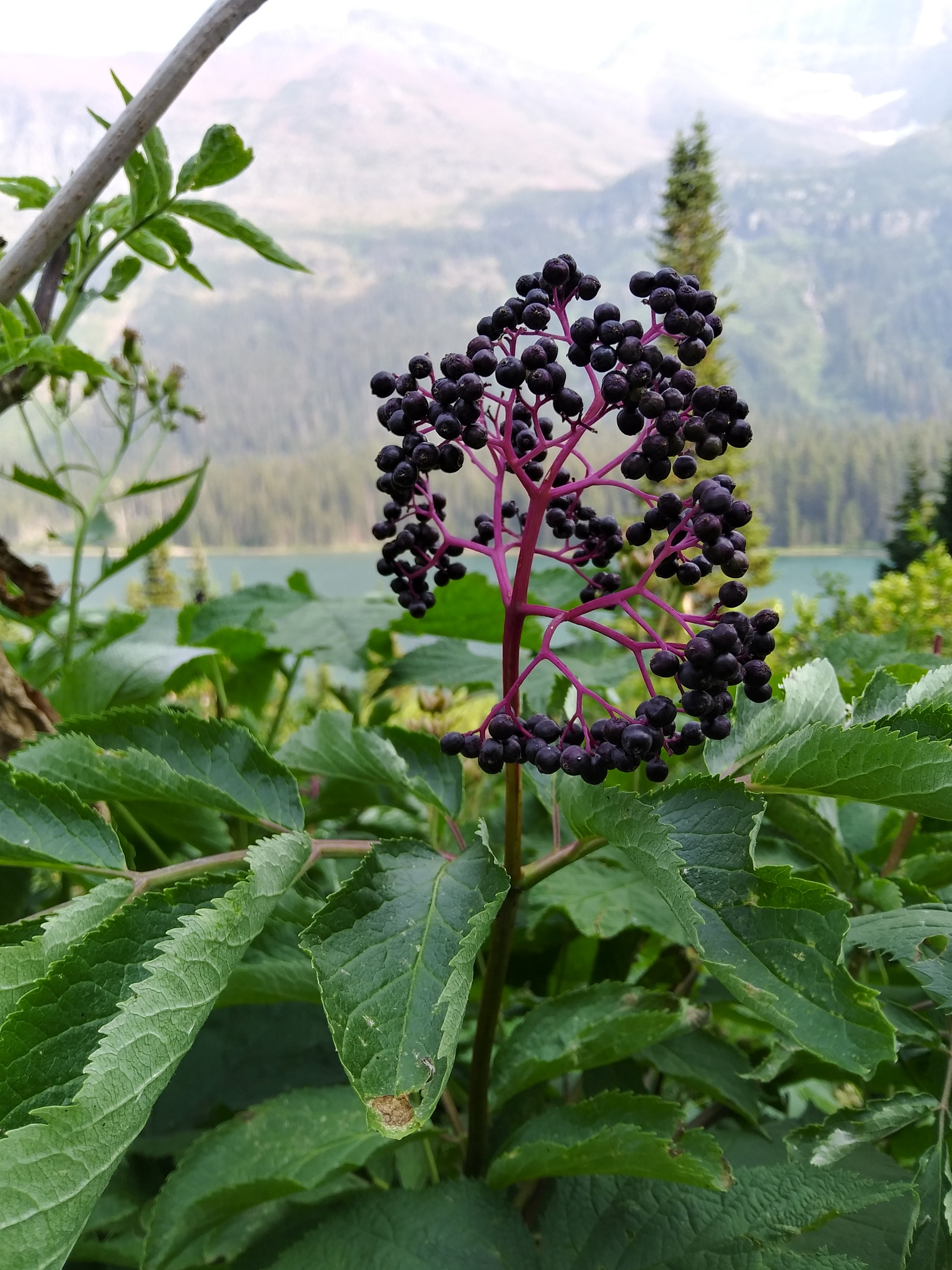
Fruit of Sambucus racemosa variety melanocarpa

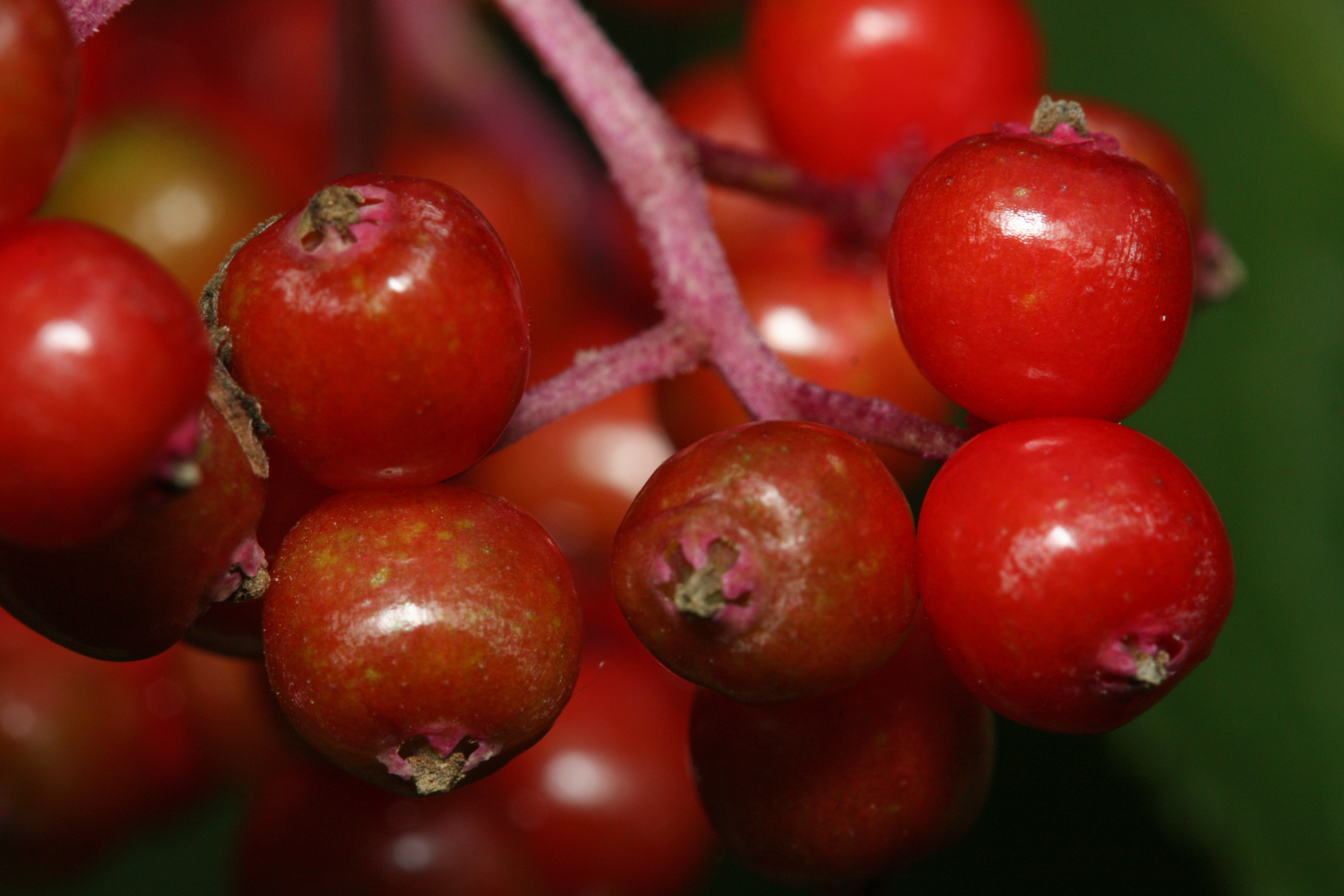
Close-up of fruit of Sambucus racemosa subspecies pubens

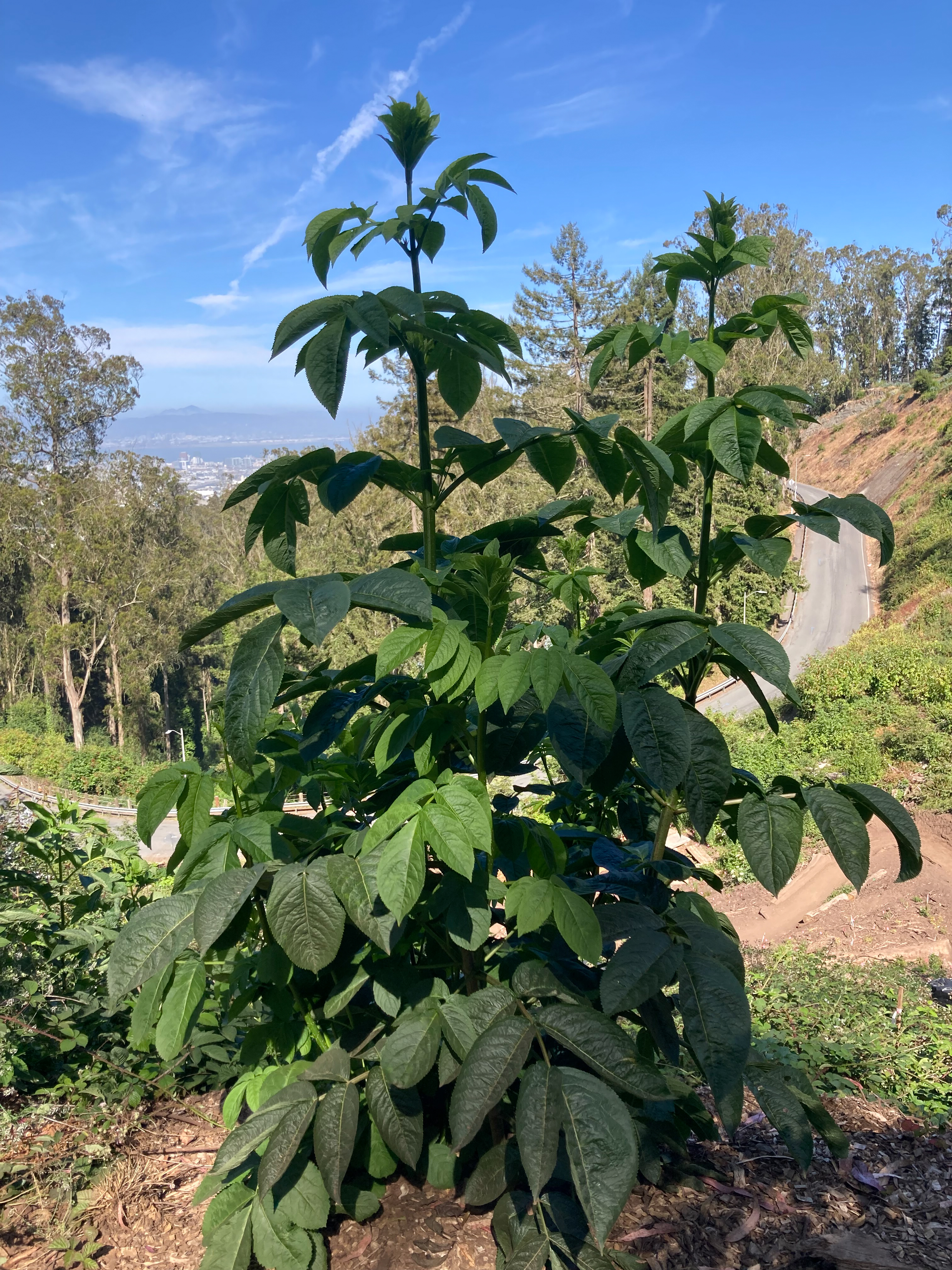
Sambucus racemosa in Golden Gate park.

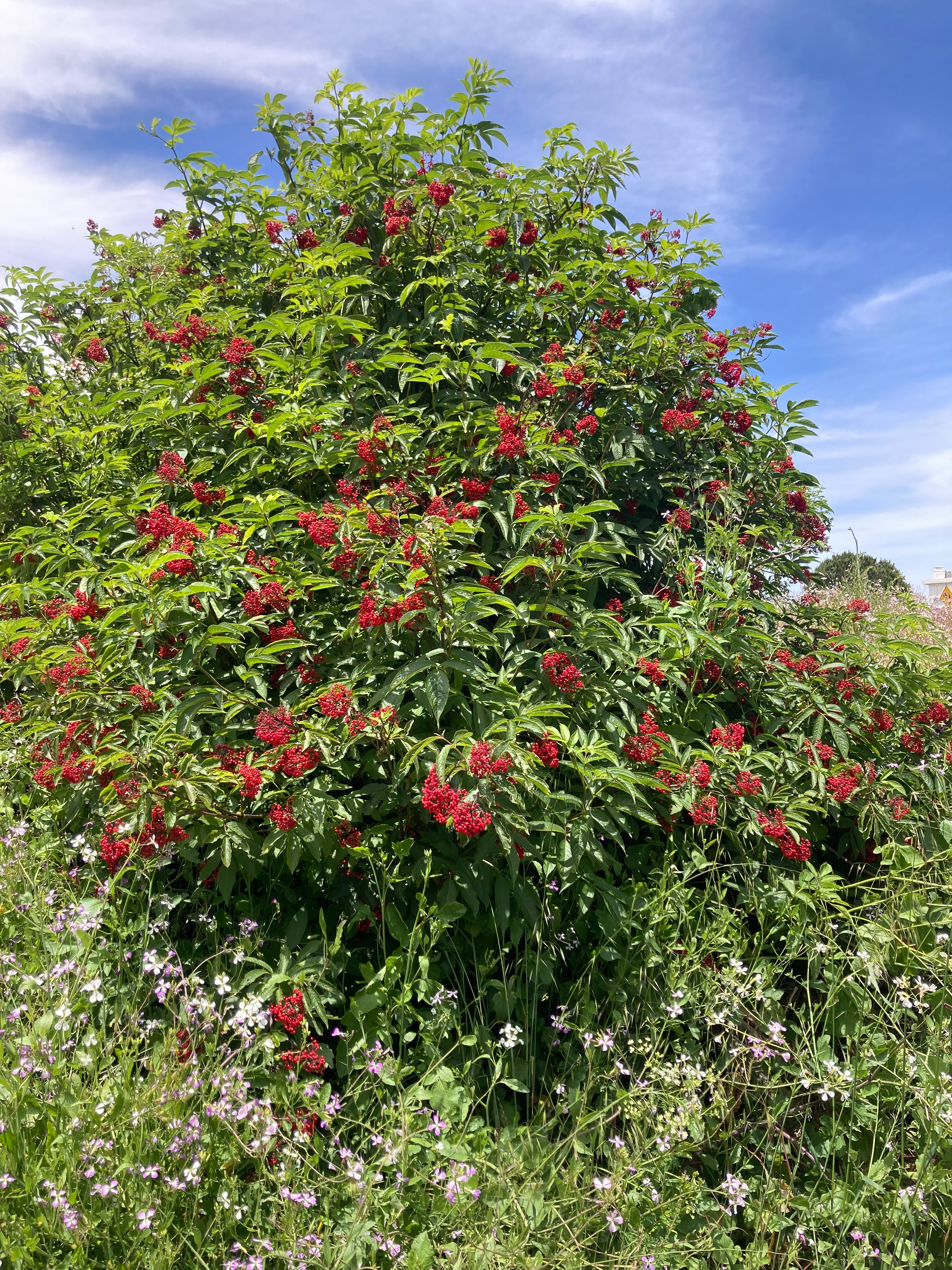
Sambucus racemosa in San Francisco.

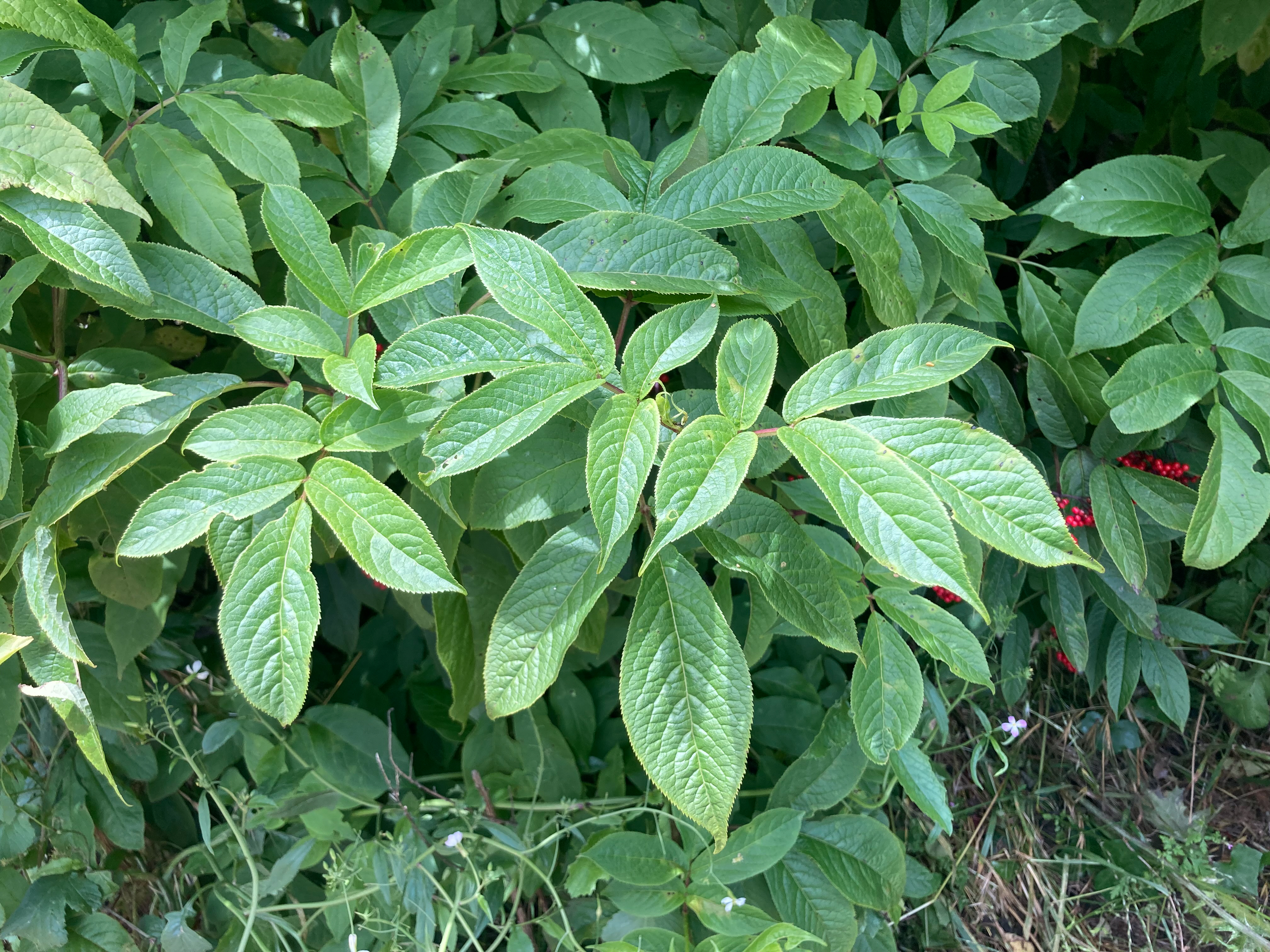
Detail of leaves.

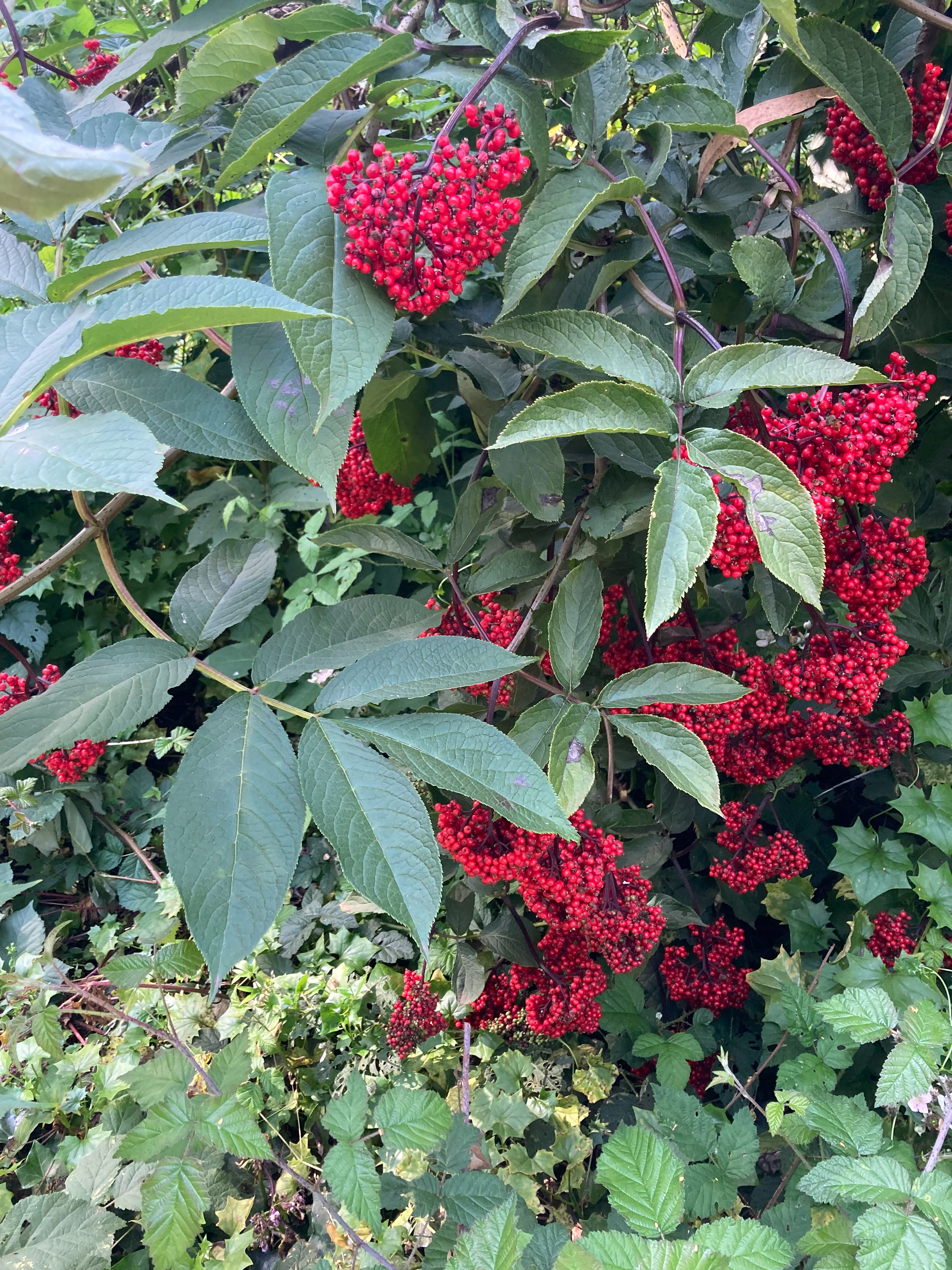
Leaves and fruits.

== Bibliography ==
- Ehrlén, Johan; Eriksson, Ove (1991). "Phenological variation in fruit characteristics in vertebrate-dispersed plants". Oecologia. 86 (4): 463–470. Bibcode:1991Oecol..86..463E. doi:10.1007/BF00318311. ISSN 0029-8549. PMID 28313326.
- Linnaeus, Carl (1753). Species Plantarum: exhibentes plantas rite cognitas, ad genera relatas, cum differentiis specificis, nominibus trivialibus, synonymis selectis, locis natalibus, secundum systema sexuale digestas (1st ed.). Stockholm: Impensis Laurentii Salvii.
