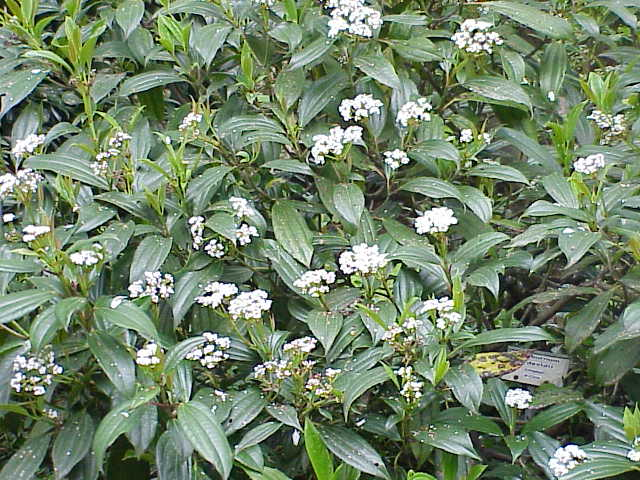

Scientific classification
- Kingdom: Plantae
- Clade: Tracheophytes
- Clade: Angiosperms
- Clade: Eudicots
- Clade: Asterids
- Order: Dipsacales
- Family: Adoxaceae
- Genus: Viburnum
- Species: V. davidii

Binomial name
- Viburnum davidii Franch.

= Viburnum davidii =

Species of flowering plant

Viburnum davidii, the David's viburnum, is a species of flowering plant in the family Adoxaceae native to western China. It is an evergreen shrub growing to 1.5 m (5 ft) tall and broad, with large, glossy, oval leaves up to 15 cm (6 in) long. Each leaf is deeply veined lengthwise with three curved lines. Round clusters of tiny white flowers are produced in late spring, followed in late summer and autumn by oval dark blue fruit. Both male and female plants are required to produce fruit.

It is very similar to Viburnum cinnamomifolium, differing only in the slightly thicker and more wrinkled leaves, and larger fruit (4.5 mm diameter, versus 3 mm in V. cinnamomifolium).

V. davidii is one of several plants commemorating the 19th century french missionary and botanist Père Armand David.

This plant has gained the Royal Horticultural Society's Award of Garden Merit.

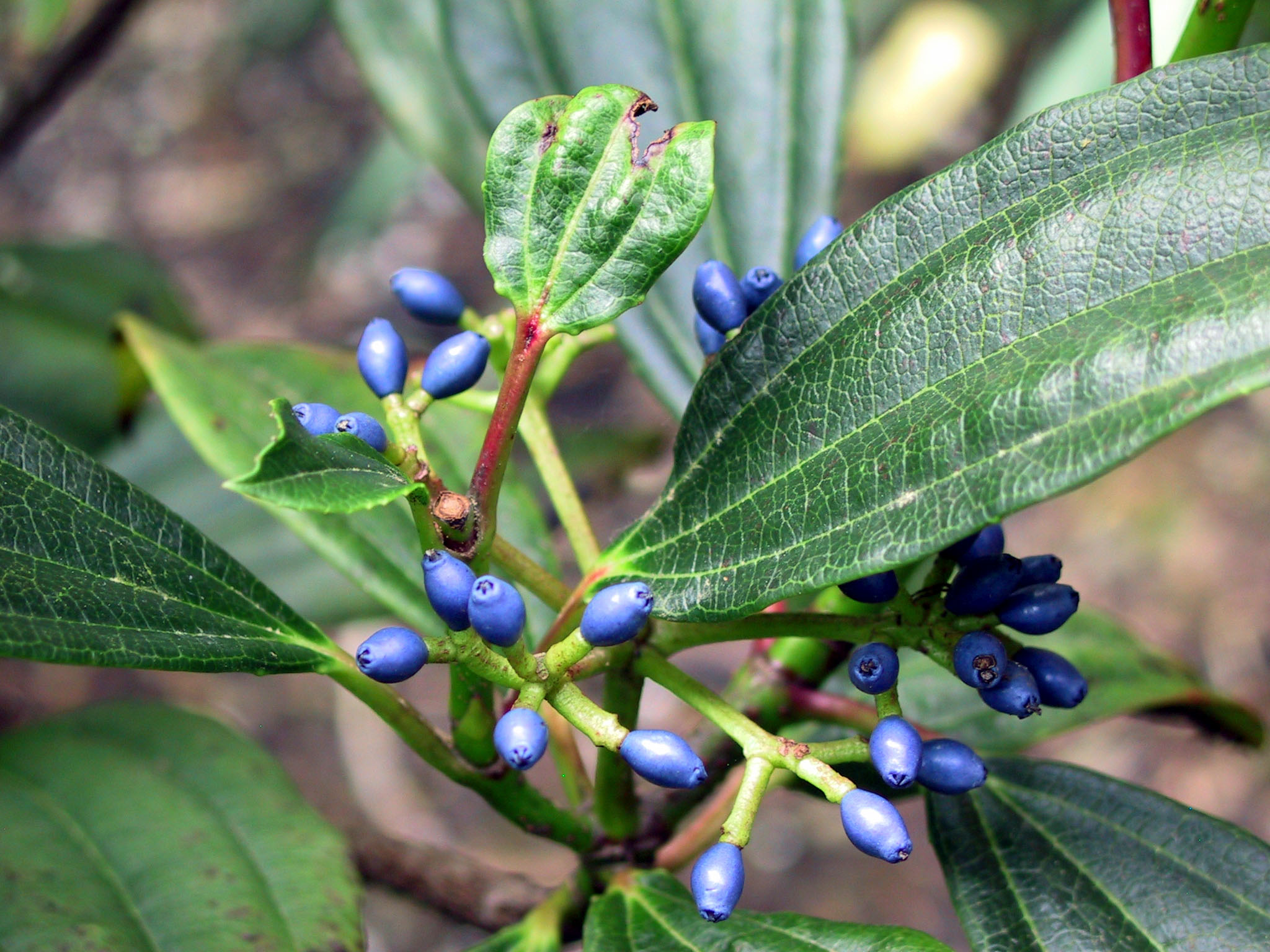
Fruit

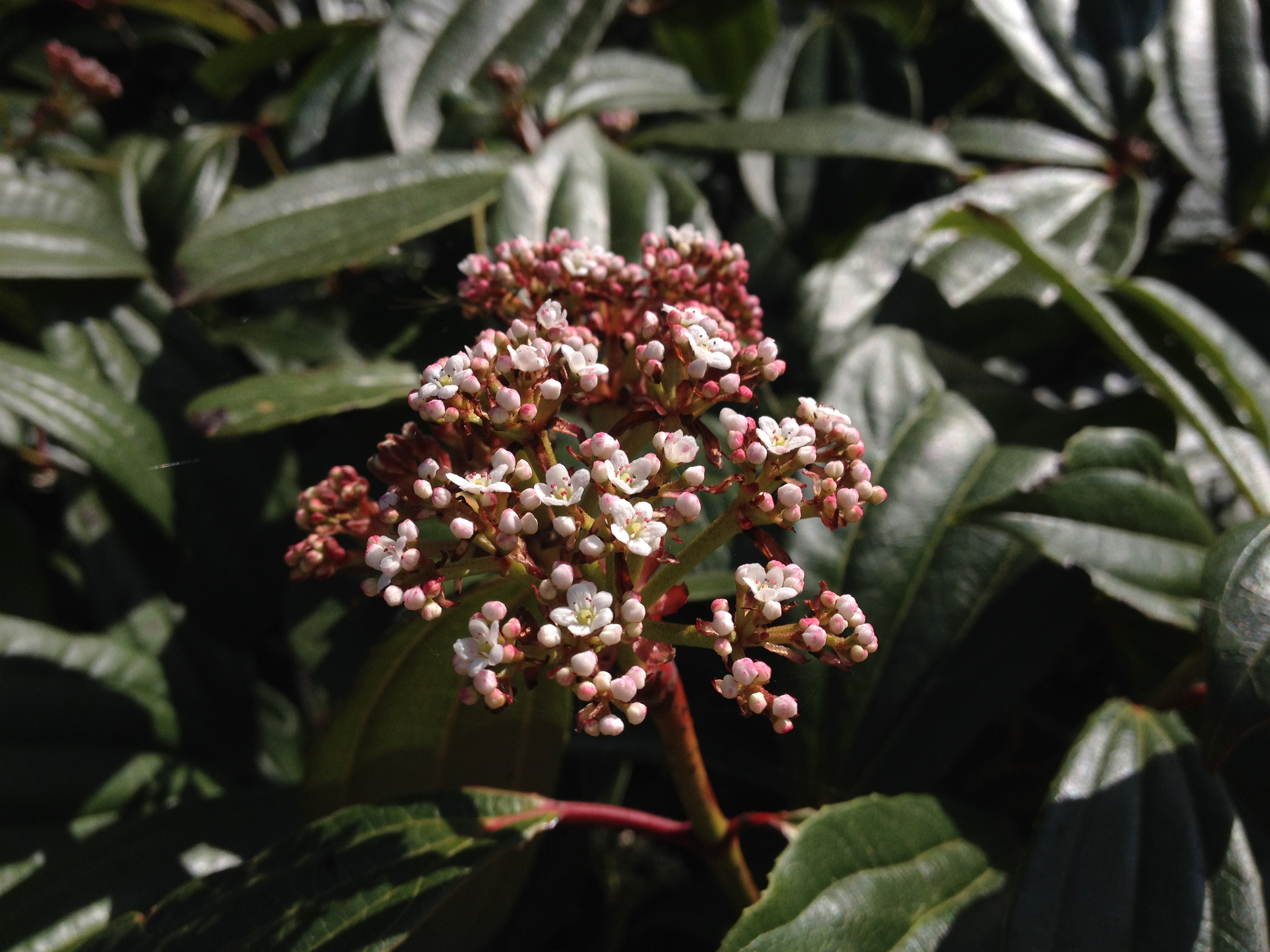
Flowers
