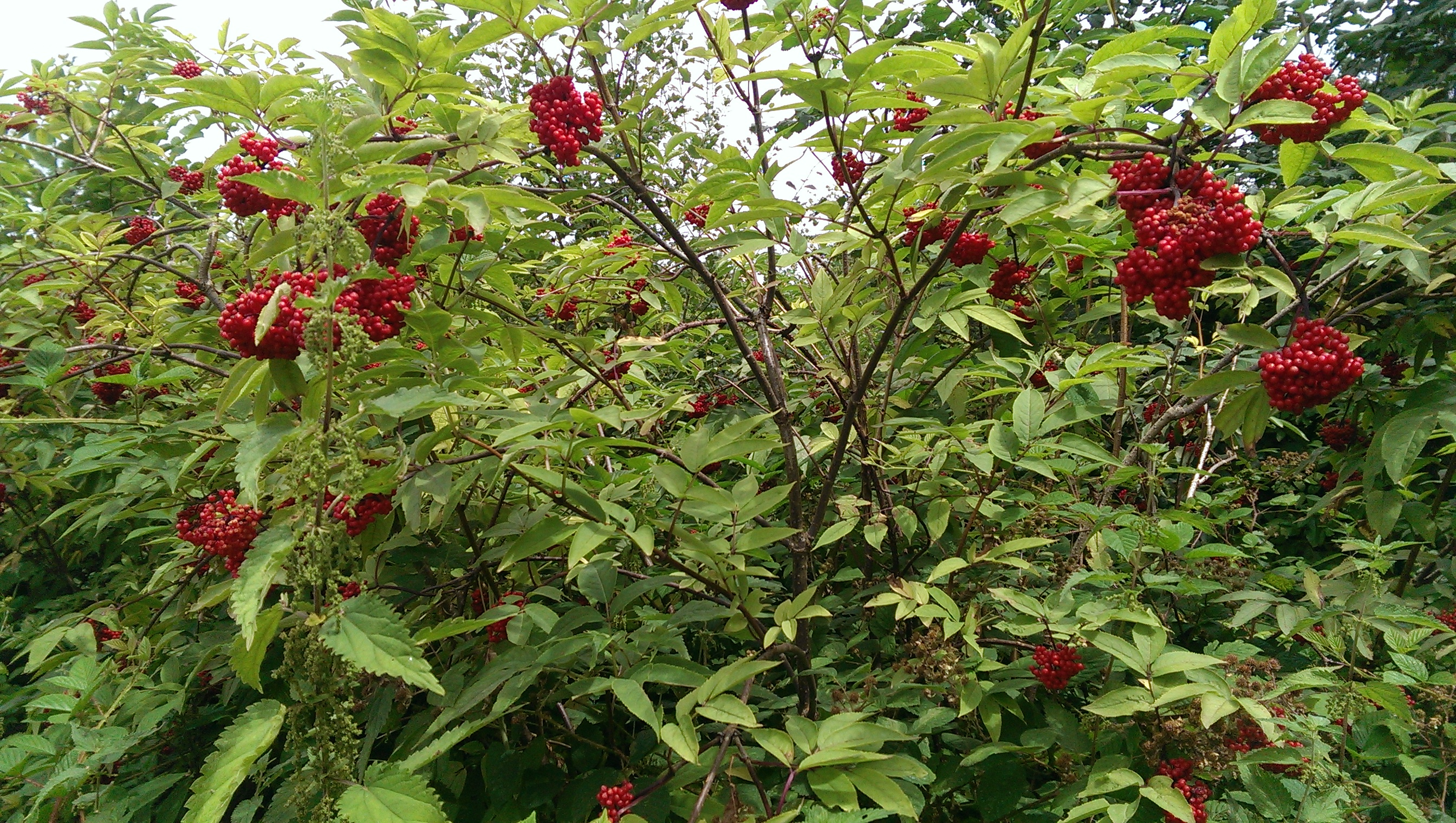
- Sambucus racemosa subsp. racemosa at Asweiler in Germany

Scientific classification
- Kingdom: Plantae
- Clade: Tracheophytes
- Clade: Angiosperms
- Clade: Eudicots
- Clade: Asterids
- Order: Dipsacales
- Family: Viburnaceae
- Genus: Sambucus
- Species: S. racemosa L.
- Subspecies: S. r. subsp. racemosa

Trinomial name
- Sambucus racemosa subsp. racemosa
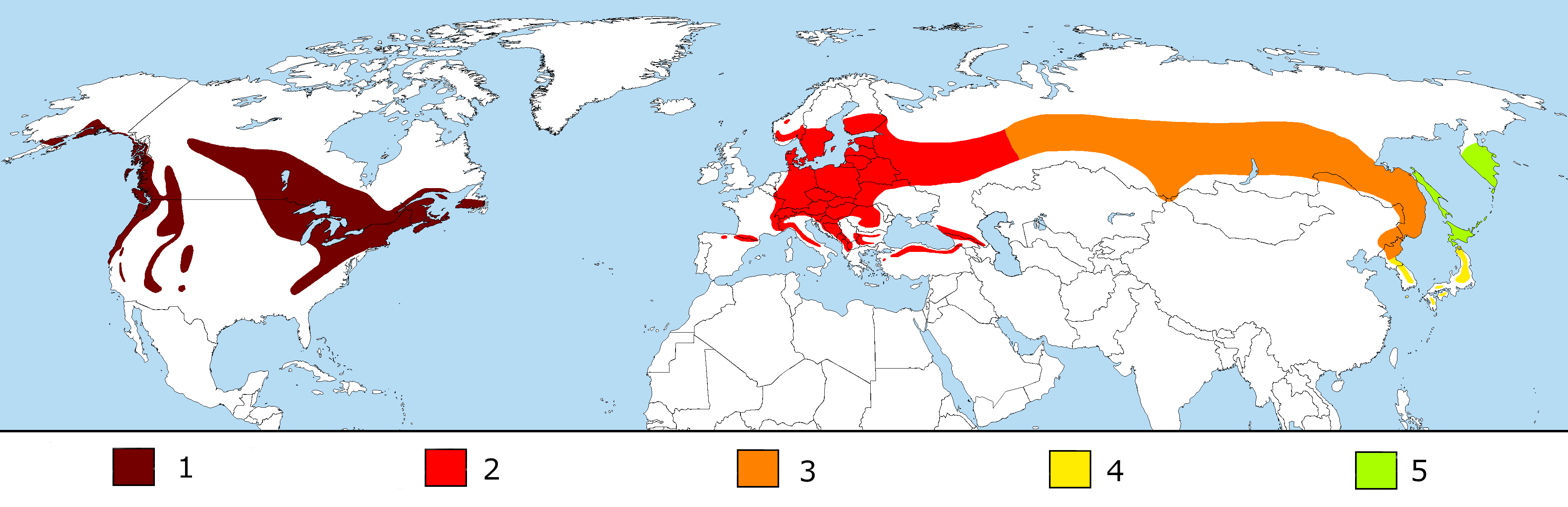
- Distribution of Sambucus racemosa subsp. racemosa (red) in Europe and southwestern Asia (other subspecies in other colours).

Synonyms
- Sambucus tigranii Troitsky

= Sambucus racemosa subsp. racemosa =

Subspecies of plant

Sambucus racemosa subsp. racemosa is a subspecies of Sambucus racemosa, with the common name European red-berried elder.

== Taxonomy ==
This particular trinomial name was automatically created by the subsequent discoveries of other subspecies within the binomial name. It is used to set it apart as the original species. Trinomials such as this are called autonyms.

== Distribution and habitat ==
The plant is native to Europe and southwestern Asia.

Locations it is found in include Albania; Armenia; Austria; Belarus; Belgium; Bulgaria; Czech Republic; Estonia; France; Germany; Greece; Hungary; Italy; Latvia; Lithuania; the Netherlands; Poland; Romania; European Russia; Slovakia; Spain; Switzerland; Ukraine; and the present day states of former Yugoslavia.
