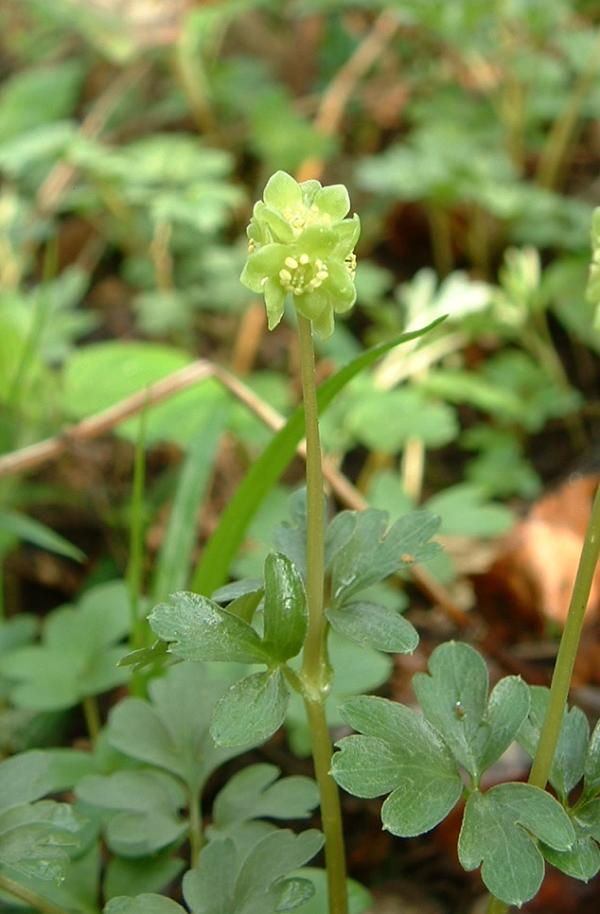
- Adoxa moschatellina

Scientific classification
- Kingdom: Plantae
- Clade: Embryophytes
- Clade: Tracheophytes
- Clade: Spermatophytes
- Clade: Angiosperms
- Clade: Eudicots
- Clade: Asterids
- Order: Dipsacales
- Family: Viburnaceae
- Genus: Adoxa; L.

Species
- Adoxa corydalifolia (C.Y.Wu, Z.L.Wu & R.F.Huang) Christenh. & Byng; Adoxa moschatellina L.; Adoxa omeiensis H.Hara; Adoxa xizangensis G.Yao

Synonyms
- Moscatella Adans.; Moschatella Scop.; Moschatellina Mill.; Sinadoxa C.Y.Wu, Z.L.Wu & R.F.Huang; Tetradoxa C.Y.Wu

= Adoxa =

Genus of flowering plants

Adoxa is the type genus of flowering plants in the family Viburnaceae. It contains four species, including the moschatel (A. moschatellina).

- Adoxa corydalifolia (C.Y.Wu, Z.L.Wu & R.F.Huang) Christenh. & Byng
- Adoxa moschatellina L.
- Adoxa omeiensis H.Hara
- Adoxa xizangensis G.Yao

The genus was first described by Carl Linnaeus in 1753 in Species Plantarum. The family Adoxaceae is named after the genus.
