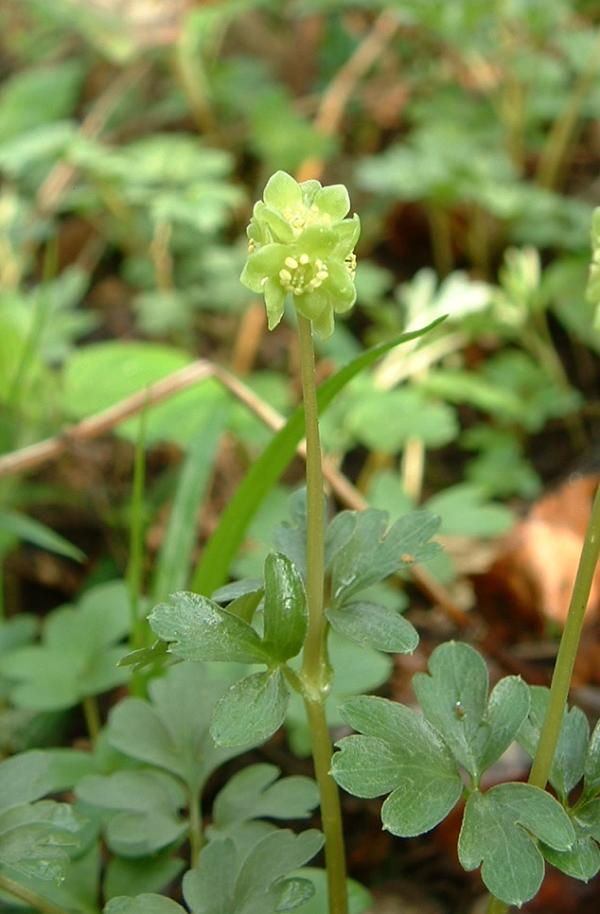

Conservation status
- Secure (NatureServe)

Scientific classification
- Kingdom: Plantae
- Clade: Tracheophytes
- Clade: Angiosperms
- Clade: Eudicots
- Clade: Asterids
- Order: Dipsacales
- Family: Viburnaceae
- Genus: Adoxa
- Species: A. moschatellina

Binomial name
- Adoxa moschatellina L.

= Adoxa moschatellina =

Species of flowering plant in the moschatel family

Adoxa moschatellina, moschatel, is a species of flowering plant in the family Viburnaceae which has a highly distinctive inflorescence. This herbaceous perennial grows in relatively sunny places in old woodland, such as the edges of streams, and in shady places in open habitats such as rock crevices in limestone pavements. It has a limited ability to spread by seed, but expands vegetatively via its long stolons. It is a widespread but generally uncommon plant which is not considered to be threatened within its natural range.

== Description ==
Moschatel is a patch-forming perennial about 10–15 cm (4–6 in) tall, with pale green foliage and a delicate appearance. It has swollen, fleshy rhizomes as well as long, slender stolons. The aerial stems are produced in early spring (typically around the end of February in England), long before the woodland canopy forms. They are slender, erect and unbranched, typically with two basal leaves on long petioles, which are almost as long as the stem, and two opposite leaves at the top, which have short petioles that are expanded towards the base. There are no stipules. The whole plant is entirely glabrous (hairless).

The basal leaves are a dull green above, silvery and succulent below, and dotted with stomata only on the undersides. The basal leaves are ternate (i.e. divided into 3 lobes) or twice ternate, and up to 5 cm (2 in) long, whereas the stem leaves have 2 or 3 lobes, with blades up to 3 cm (1.2 in) long.

At the top of the stem, on a peduncle which is at least as long as the stem itself, at flowering, is an inflorescence that is unique to this genus and highly distinctive. It consists of a cubical cluster of 5 green flowers, about 0.5 cm in diameter, with four 5-petalled flowers on the sides of the cube and one 4-petalled flower at the top. They are said to smell faintly of musk, especially "towards the evening when the dew falls." The lateral flowers each have 5 stamens (which are deeply divided so it looks as if there are 10) and 2–5 styles. The terminal flower has only 4, similarly divided, stamens. Below the corolla, the calyx consists of 3 lobes in the lateral flowers and just 2 in the terminal one.

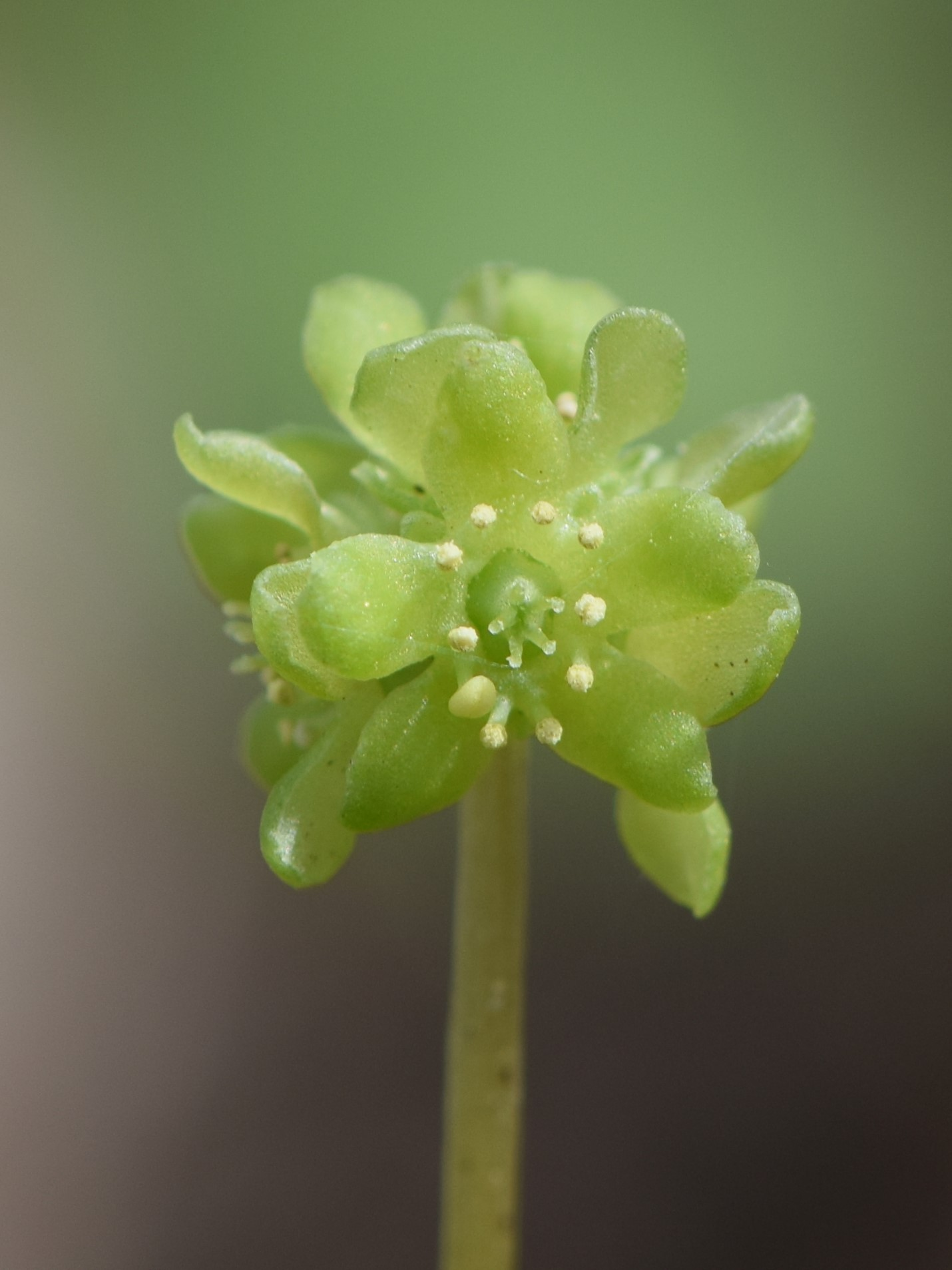
The lateral flowers usually have 5 petals.

Fruits are formed in April to May in England. Each flower can develop 2–5 fruits, which are rather dry drupes, 4.5–5.55 mm in diameter, partially encased by the expanded, fleshy calyx. At this time the peduncle expands and spirals, bending towards to ground to deposit the fruits close to the parent plant. Fruiting is uncommon, as reproduction is mainly vegetative, through the stolons and rhizomes.

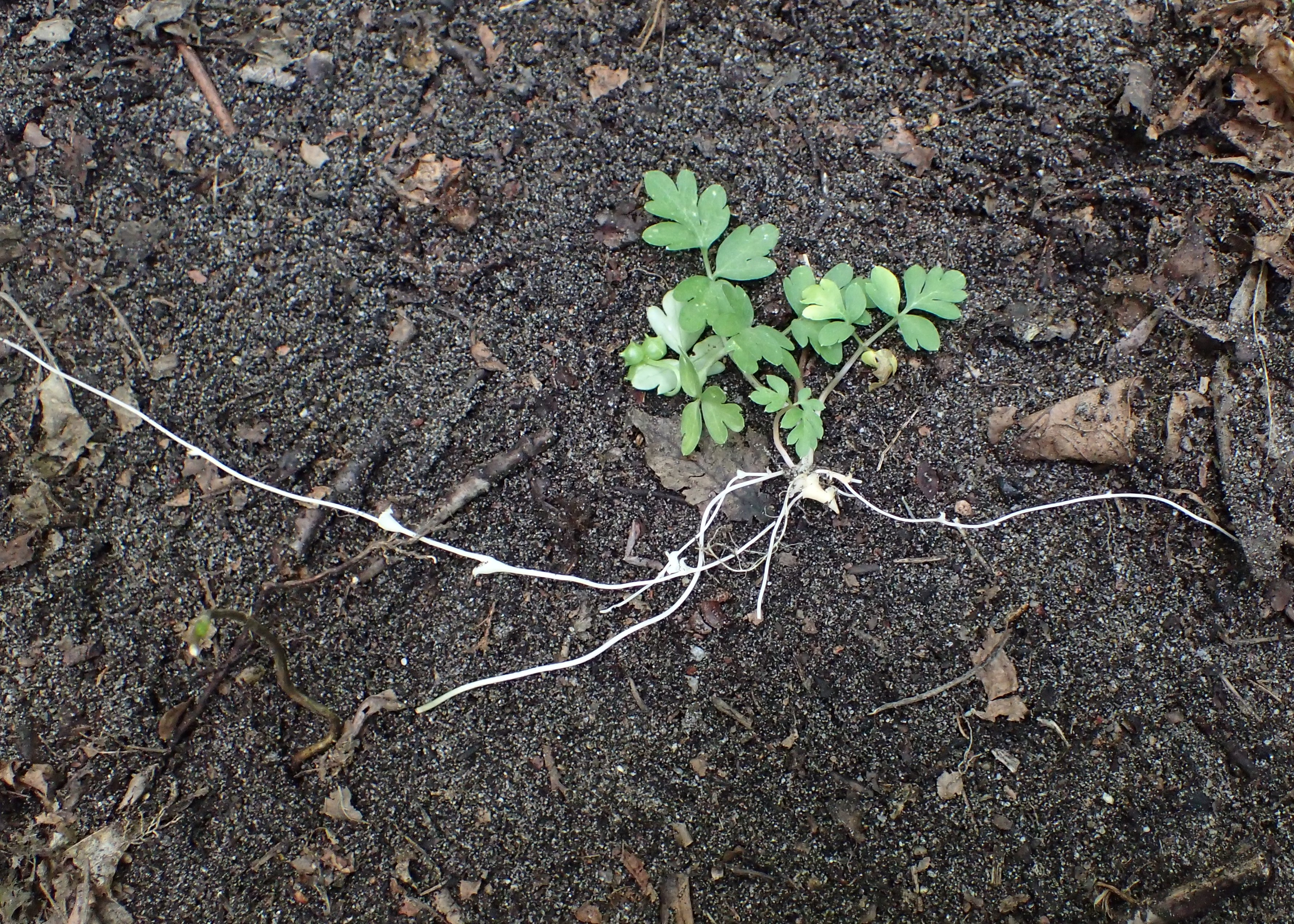
Moschatel spreads more rapidly by its long stolons than by seed.

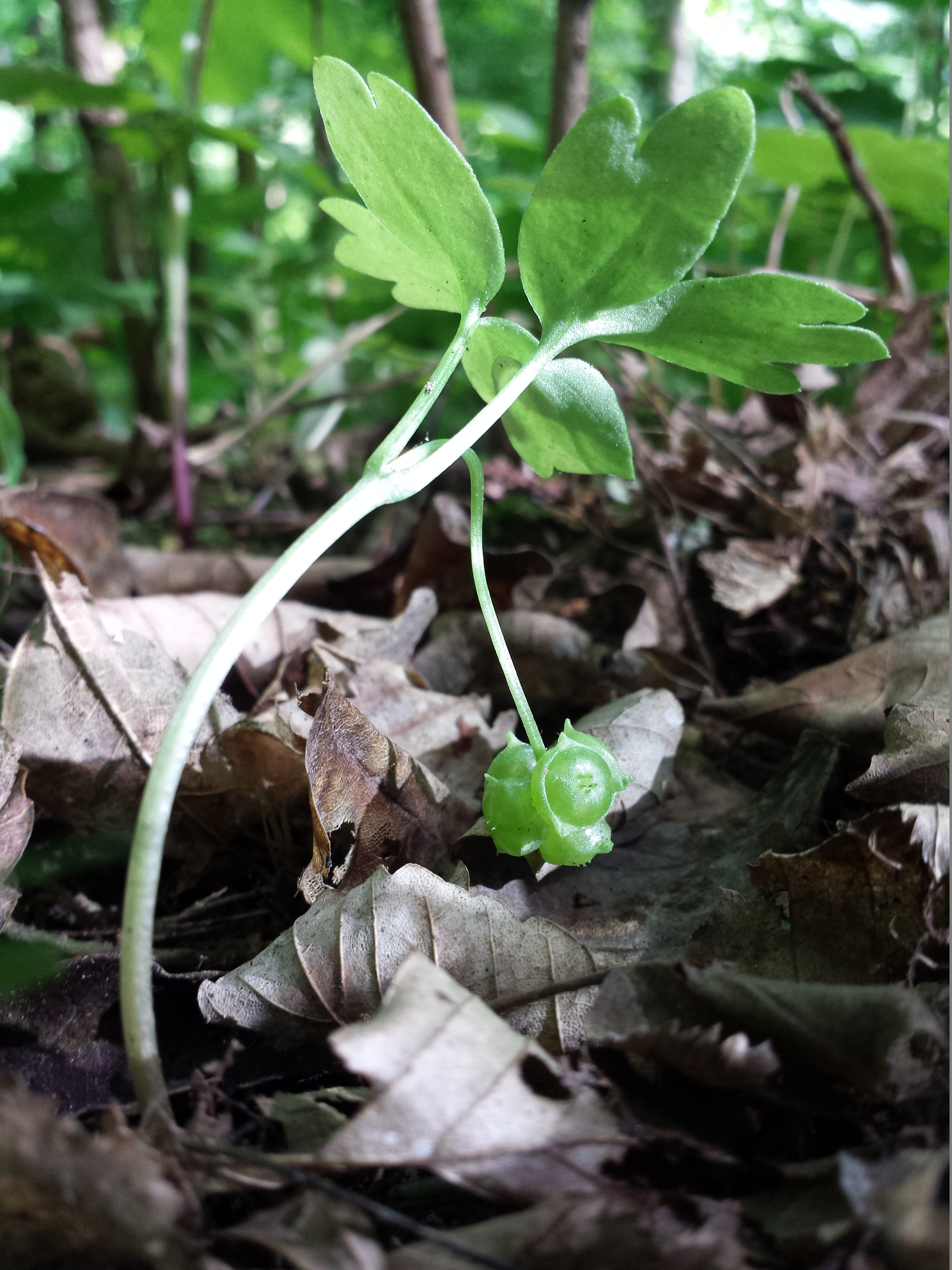
The seeds are deposited onto the ground close to the parent plant.

== Taxonomy ==
Moschatel is a highly distinctive plant, owing to its curious arrangement of flowers. For many years it had been considered the only species in its plant family, the Adoxaceae. However, in 2018 a second species of Adoxa was discovered in China and, meanwhile, cytological and genetics studies have shown that family should include the elders and viburnums.

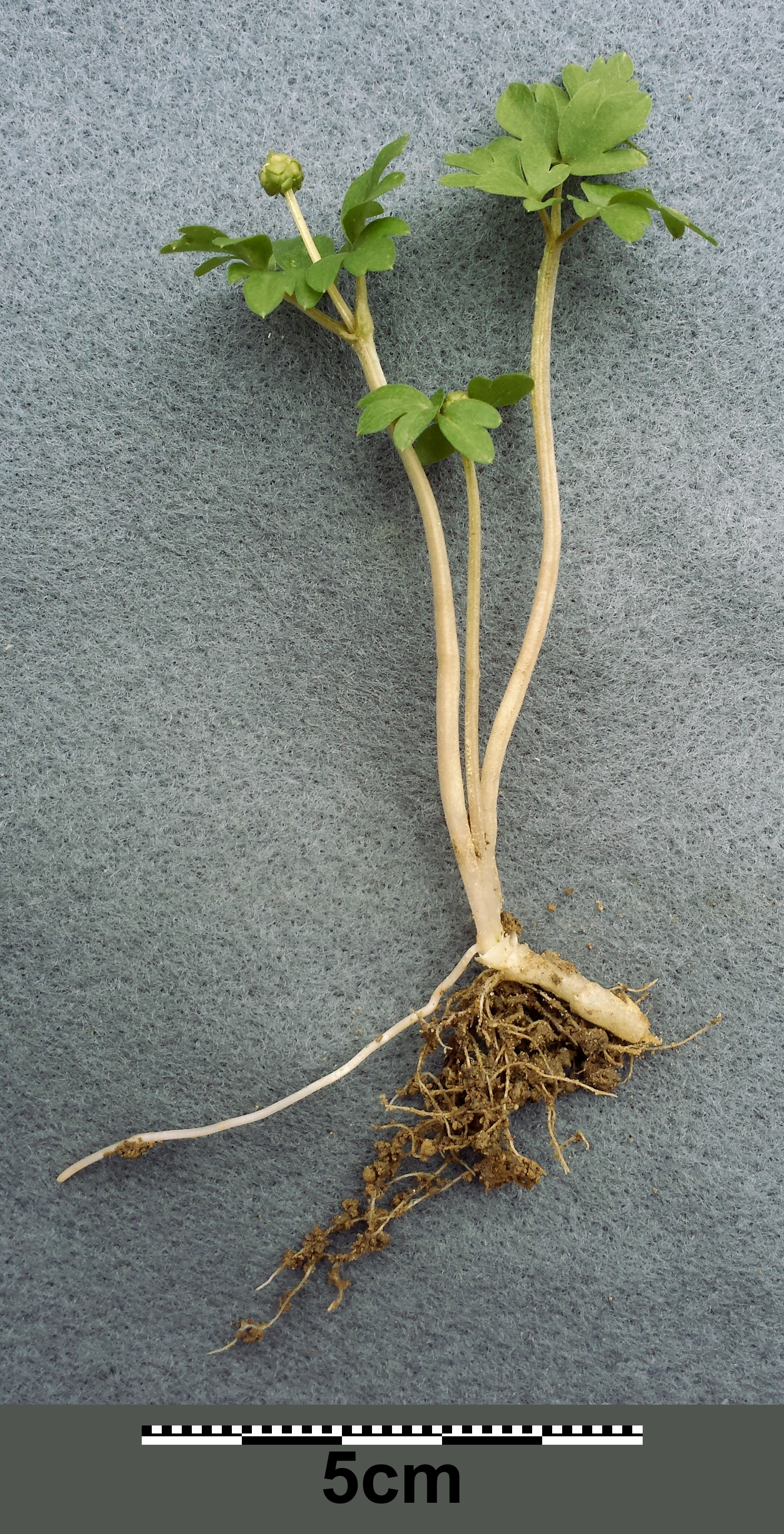
Plants can have short, thick rhizomes and long, slender stolons that appear to have hollow centres.

Its name was given by Linnaeus in 1753, in Species Plantarum (p. 367) and it has received a few synonyms since then, including Moscatella adoxa (Scop., 1771) and Moschatellina fumariifolia (Bubani, 1899), but these have not stuck.

Its chromosome number is 2n = 36.

Several varieties and subspecies have been described: var. insularis (Nepomn.) S.Y. Li & Z.H. Ning occurs in eastern Russia; and subsp. cescae Peruzzi & N.G. Passal is found in southern Italy. It is a triploid (2n = 54) with smaller pollen and stomata. Other plants are, by default, subsp. moschatellina, although this name has not been formally published. It is not known to hybridise with any other species.

The word "Adoxa" comes from the Ancient Greek δόξᾰ (doxa), meaning glory or splendour, and the Latin prefix a-, which means "not" or "without", and refers to its humble size and appearance. The specific epithet moschatellina and the common name moschatel come from the Latin word for musk, which refers to the scent produced by male musk deer, as it is apparently similar to the smell of the flowers.

Other common names include five-faced bishop, hollowroot, muskroot, townhall clock, tuberous crowfoot and Good Friday plant. The name hollowroot presumably comes from the way the stolons (not actually the roots) have a dark core and so have the appearance, in a cut section, of being hollow.

== Distribution and status ==
Adoxa moschatellina has a boreal, circumpolar distribution in Europe, Asia and North America, and just extending into Morocco in North Africa. It is not established as an introduced species beyond its natural range, except possibly in Ireland. It is generally not considered to be rare or threatened: in the United States it is classified as "secure" and, while it has not been assessed internationally by the IUCN, many European countries classify it as "Least Concern".

It is widespread in most parts of Britain but not common, being generally restricted to small patches in areas of ancient woodland. It becomes scarce in the north and west, where the soils are too acid for it, and parts of eastern England where there has been little woodland cover. It is absent from Ireland except in a couple of places where it was probably introduced, deliberately or accidentally.

== Habitat and ecology ==
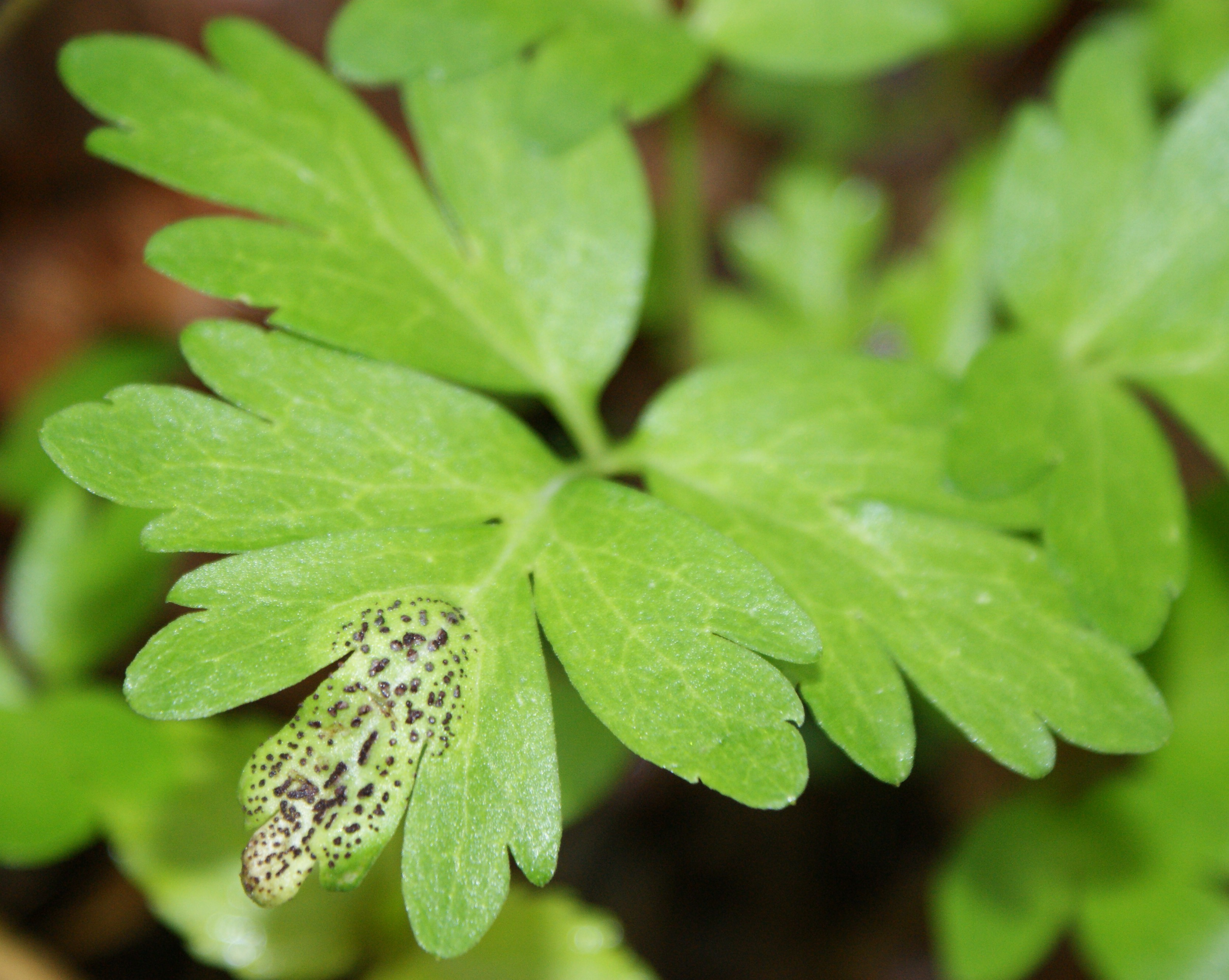
Puccinia adoxae telia

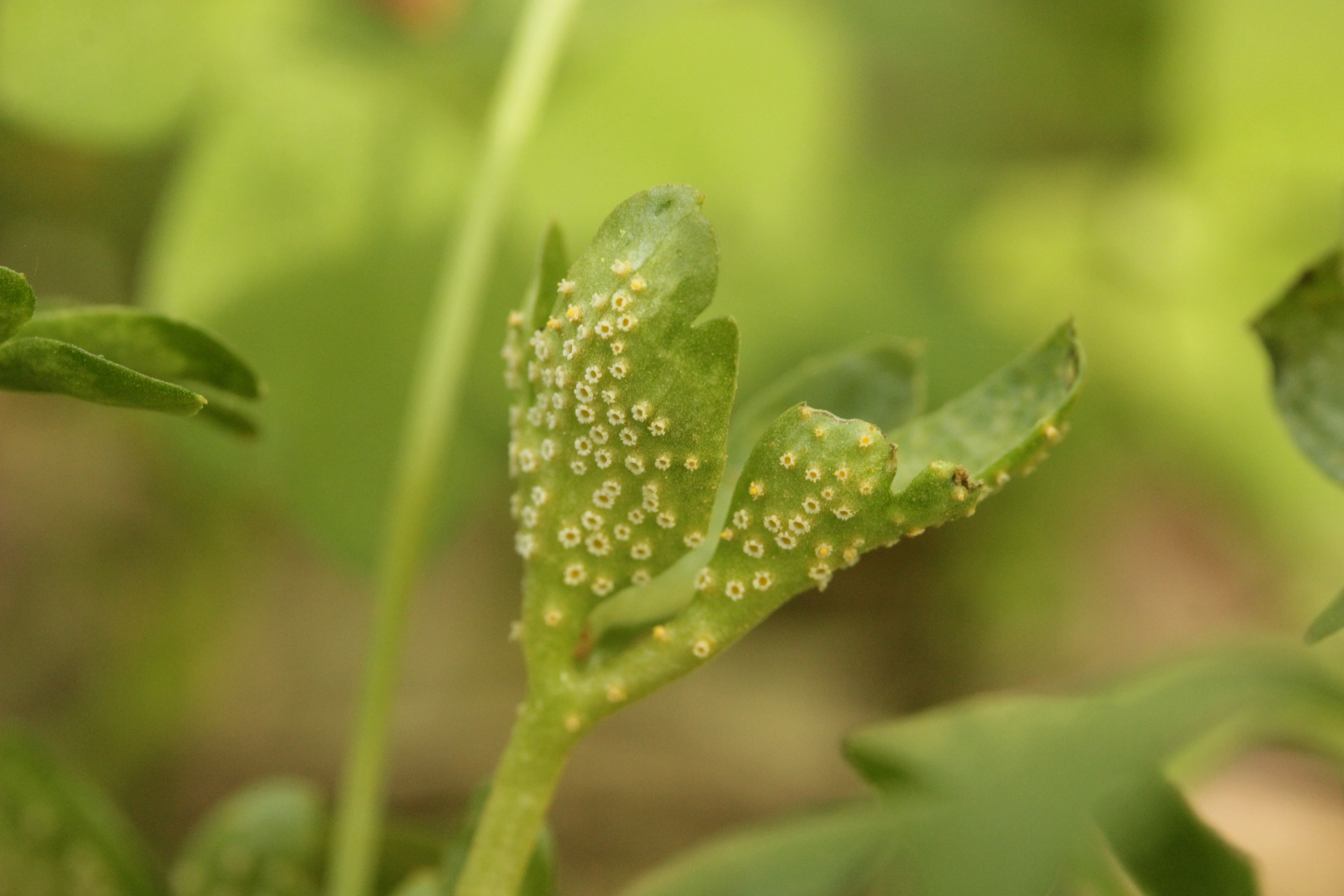
Puccinia argentata galls on a plant of moschatel in Germany

Moschatel grows in woodland and scrub, typically in places with fairly light shade, such as the edges of paths or alongside streams and rivers. Its Ellenberg values in Britain are L = 4, F = 5, R = 6, N = 5, and S = 0, which show that it favours lower than average levels of light and nutrients, and higher than average moisture and alkalinity. It is found in deciduous woods under ash, pedunculate oak, sessile oak, hornbeam or beech trees, typically towards the bottom of any slope, where the soil is damper and more base-rich, amongst dog's mercury and wood anemone. This habitat is, under the British National Vegetation Classification, considered to be ash wood, W8 in the lowlands and W9 in the uplands. It is also recorded in elder scrub (W6d) along riverbanks. In the Scottish Highlands and Snowdonia, it occurs in juniper scrub (W19), and in shady nooks amongst boulders in upland heaths and pillow lavas (on Cadair Idris).

It is a spring-flowering species which dies back after flowering in May or June. The seeds are deposited on the ground close to the parent plant, thus limiting its ability to spread. This lack of dispersal capacity helps to account for it being largely restricted to ancient woodland, although it is known to establish well in new sites if transported there manually. Spread is more facilitated more by the rhizomes and stolons than by seed production.

In Scotland it is recorded as high as 1,065 m (3,494 ft) on Ben Lawers, and in England up to 760 m (2,490 ft) at Knock Fell.

The rather plain flowers are pollinated by flies and nocturnal moths which do not rely on colour to pollinate plants.

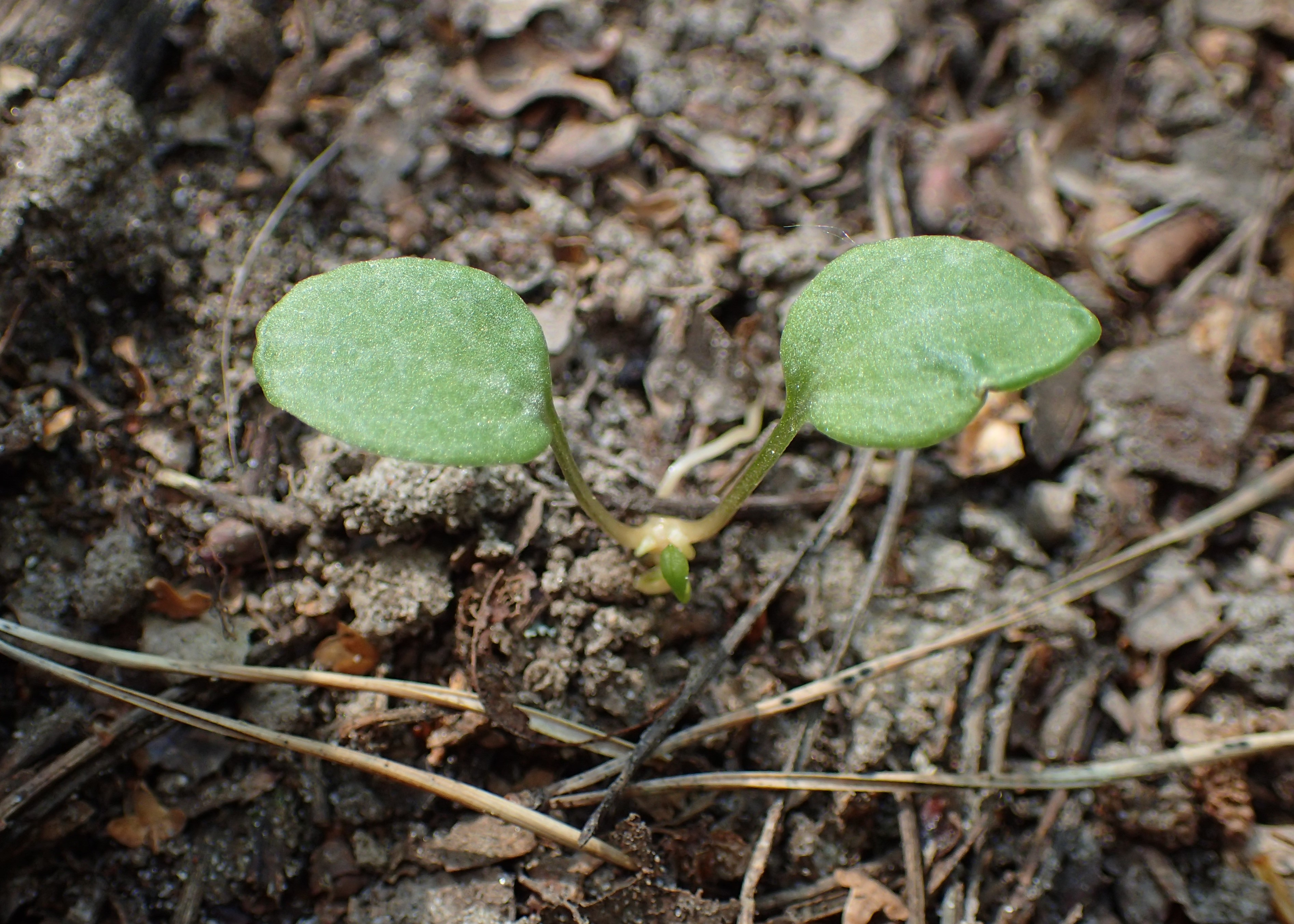
The seed leaves are simple and almost circular.

Insect associations with moschatel appear to be rare. The larvae of two species of sawfly are known to feed on this plant in Britain: Paracharactus gracilicornis (Zaddach, 1859) and Sciapteryx consobrina (Klug, 1816).

In Europe, moschatel is often infected with the rust Puccinia adoxae R. Hedw., which produces small black telia (blisters) on the stems and leaves. Puccinia albescens (Grev.) Plowr. and P. argentata (Schultz) G. Winter (syn. P. impatientis) make whitish galls as well as black telia. More rarely, it can be parasitized by Melanotaenium adoxae, which produces yellow-white blisters.
