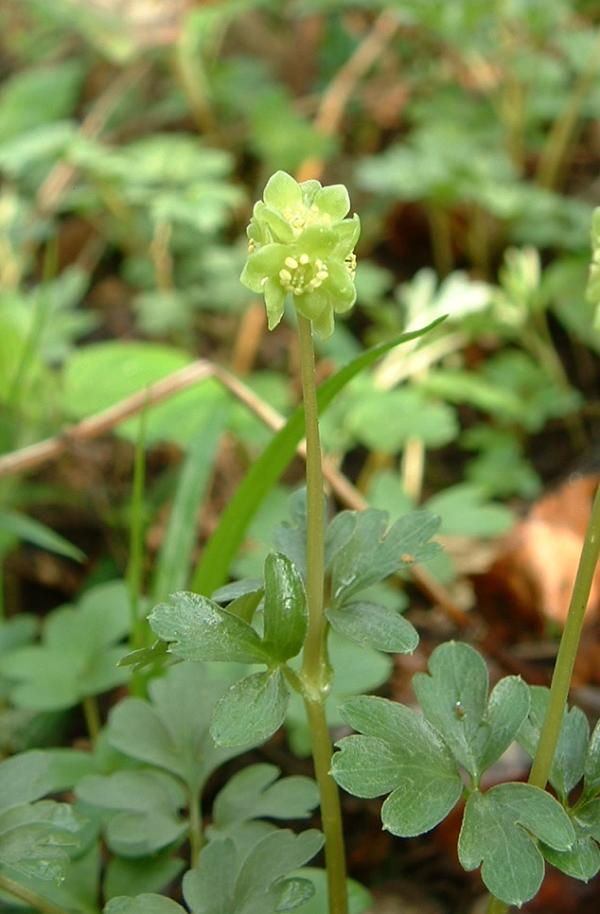
- Adoxa moschatellina

Scientific classification
- Kingdom: Plantae
- Clade: Embryophytes
- Clade: Tracheophytes
- Clade: Spermatophytes
- Clade: Angiosperms
- Clade: Eudicots
- Clade: Asterids
- Order: Dipsacales
- Family: Viburnaceae; Raf.

Type genus
- Viburnum L.

Genera
- Adoxa L.; Sambucus L.; Viburnum L.

= Viburnaceae =

Family of plants

Viburnaceae or Adoxaceae, commonly known as the moschatel family, is a small family of flowering plants in the order Dipsacales, which includes three genera – Adoxa, Sambucus, and Viburnum – and 150–200 species. They are characterised by opposite toothed leaves, small five- or, more rarely, four-petalled flowers in cymose inflorescences, and the fruit being a drupe. They are thus similar to many Cornaceae.

In older classifications, this entire family was part of Caprifoliaceae, the honeysuckle family. Adoxa (moschatel) was the first plant to be moved to this new group. Much later, the genera Sambucus (elders) and Viburnum were added after careful morphological analysis and biochemical tests by the Angiosperm Phylogeny Group.

In 2008, Reveal proposed conserving the name Viburnaceae against the rarely used earlier name Tinaceae Martinov, and also proposed “superconserving” Adoxaceae—a later name than Viburnaceae but one then in much wider use—against Viburnaceae for the broadly circumscribed family including Adoxa, Sambucus, and Viburnum. The proposal to conserve Viburnaceae was accepted, but the proposal to superconserve Adoxaceae against Viburnaceae was ultimately rejected. Consequently, under the International Code of Nomenclature for algae, fungi, and plants, Viburnaceae is the correct name for the family when Adoxa, Sambucus, and Viburnum are included in a single family. As of March 2021, the Angiosperm Phylogeny website and Plants of the World Online by Royal Botanic Gardens, Kew refer to this family as Viburnaceae Raf., nom. cons, as do sources from November 2025.

Adoxa moschatellina is a small perennial herbaceous plant, flowering early in the spring and dying down to ground level in summer immediately after the berries are mature; the leaves are compound.

The elders are mostly shrubs, but two species are large herbaceous plants; all have compound leaves. The viburnums are all shrubs, with simple leaves.

== Gallery ==
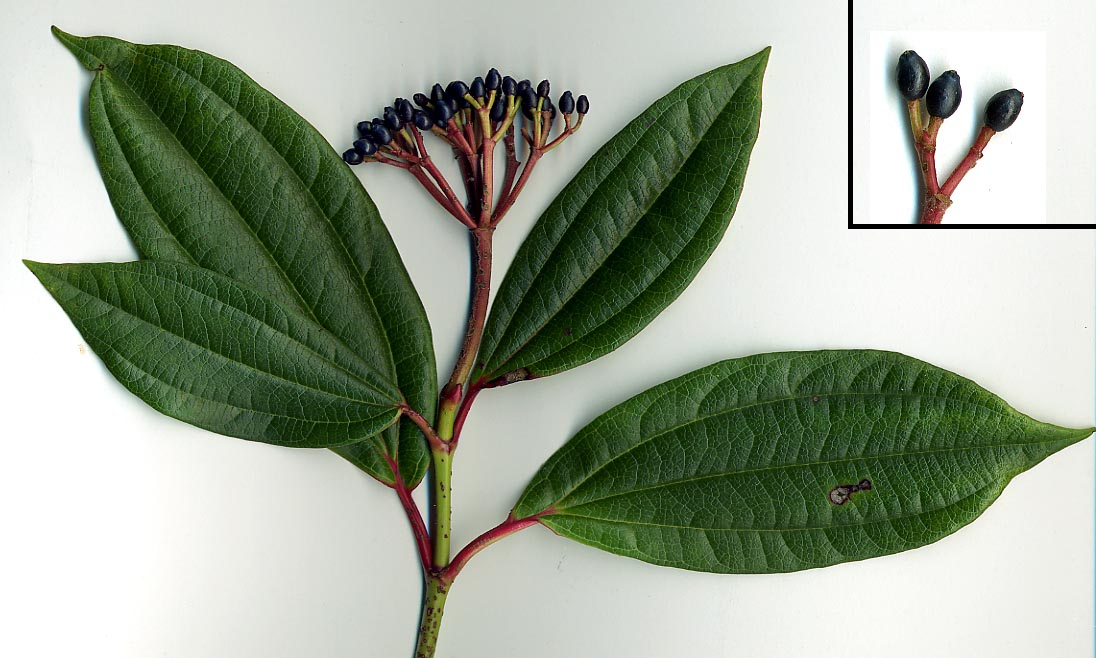
Viburnum davidii foliage and fruit

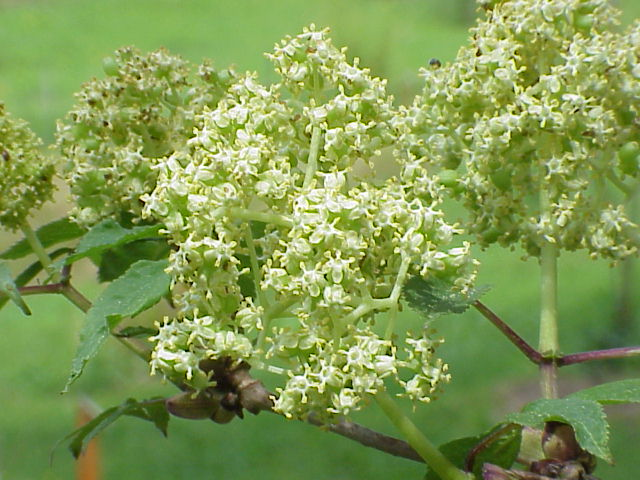
Sambucus racemosa flowers

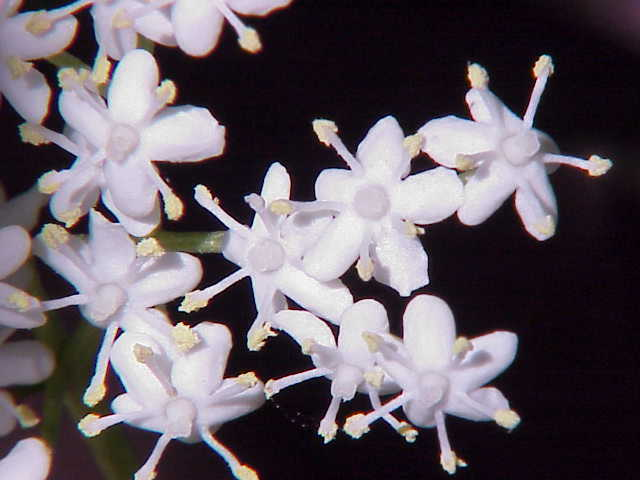
Sambucus nigra flowers

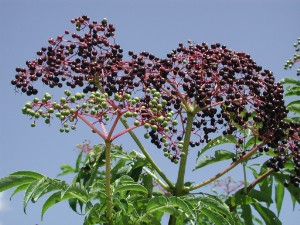
Sambucus canadensis foliage and fruit

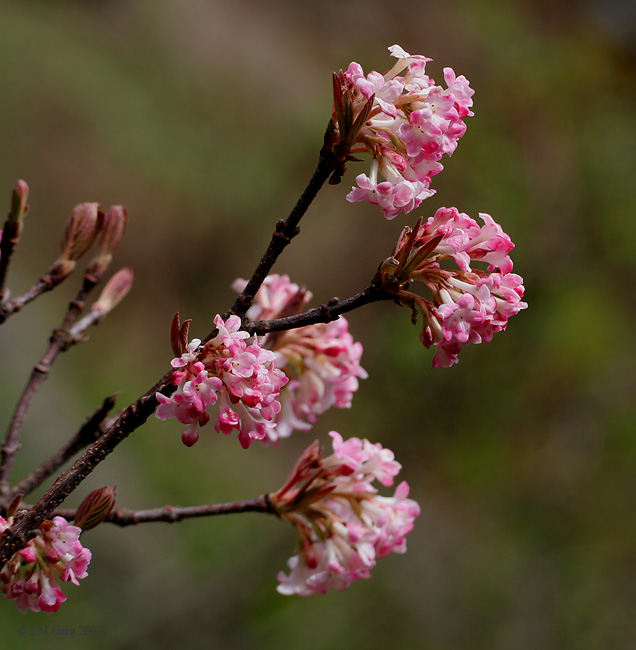
Viburnum grandiflorum
