= Viburnum elatum =

Conservation status
- Least Concern (IUCN 3.1)

Scientific classification
- Kingdom: Plantae
- Clade: Tracheophytes
- Clade: Angiosperms
- Clade: Eudicots
- Clade: Asterids
- Order: Dipsacales
- Family: Adoxaceae
- Genus: Viburnum
- Species: V. elatum

Binomial name
- Viburnum elatum Benth.

Species of flowering plant

Viburnum elatum is a species of woody plant in the family Adoxaceae (previously Caprifoliaceae). It is endemic to eastern Mexico.

== Description ==
Viburnum elatum grows as a semi-evergreen, multi-stemmed shrub or small tree.

Branches stout, pale brown, terete, smooth, not shining, glabrous; branchlets similar, very slender, slightly angular, black-punctate; buds glabrous; leaves opposite, petiolate, the petiole 1 cm long or less, deeply channelled above, winged to base, glabrous, black-punctate; blades ovate to lanceolate, small (the larger 6 cm long, 3 cm wide), acute or bluntly acuminate at apex, cuneate at base, entire or minutely serrulate, almost concolorous, glabrous, conspicuously black-punctate beneath; principal veins 5 to 7, inconspicuous, scarcely if at all elevated beneath, arcuate and anastomosing; peduncle none; cyme thrice compound, up to 3 cm long and 6.5 cm wide, the primary rays 4 or 5, about 1.5 cm long, glabrous, black-punctate; bractlets of inflorescence minute, 1 mm long or less, glabrous, those subtending the lowers about one-fourth as long as the calyx tube; calyx tube cylindric, about 2 mm long, glabrous; calyx lobes rounded, minute (about 0.5 mm long), glabrous; corolla white, rotate-campanulate, about 3 mm long, glabrous; style glabrous; fruit much flattened, black, about 10 mm long, 8 mm wide, and 3 mm thick, fleshy, not sulcate on either face, the intrusion absent.

== Distribution and habitat ==
Viburnum elatum is native to the Mexican Sierra Madre Oriental, from Nuevo Léon and Tamaulipas to Chiapas. V. elatum inhabits mesic pine-oak forests above 1000 meters (3300 feet).

== Taxonomy and evolution ==
The generic name originated in Latin, where it referred to V. lantana. The specific epithet elatum is derived from Latin elatus, meaning "elevated".

Viburnum elatum is related to the nannyberry and blackhaw viburnums of eastern North America, including V. cassinoides, V. lentago, V. nudum, V. obovatum, V. prunifolium, and V. rufidulum.

== Conservation ==
Though the most geographically widespread species of Viburnum in Mexico, V. elatum is considered rare, and is listed as conservation dependent by the IUCN.
