= Environment of Iowa =

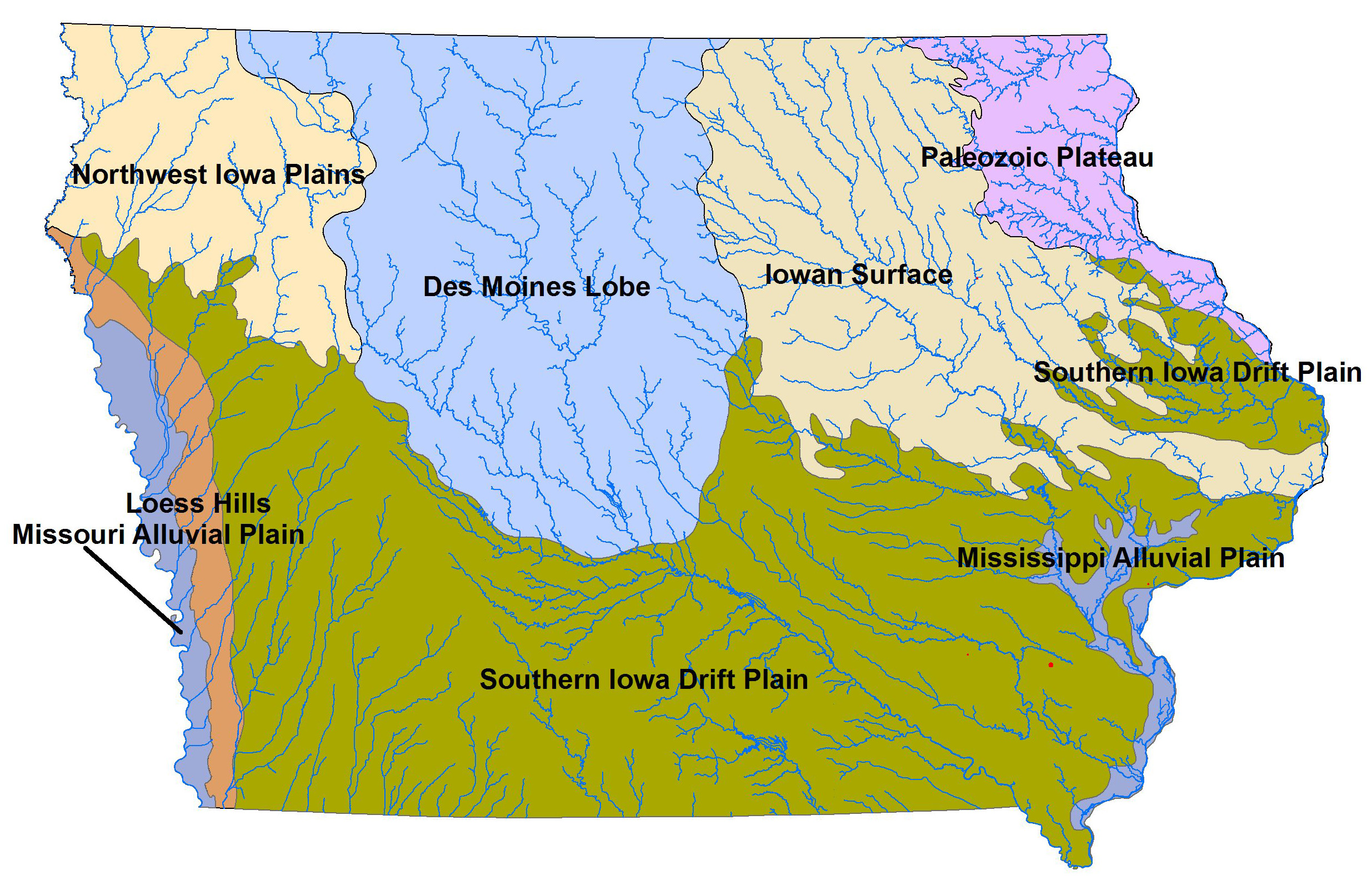
Landforms of Iowa, based on Prior (1991)

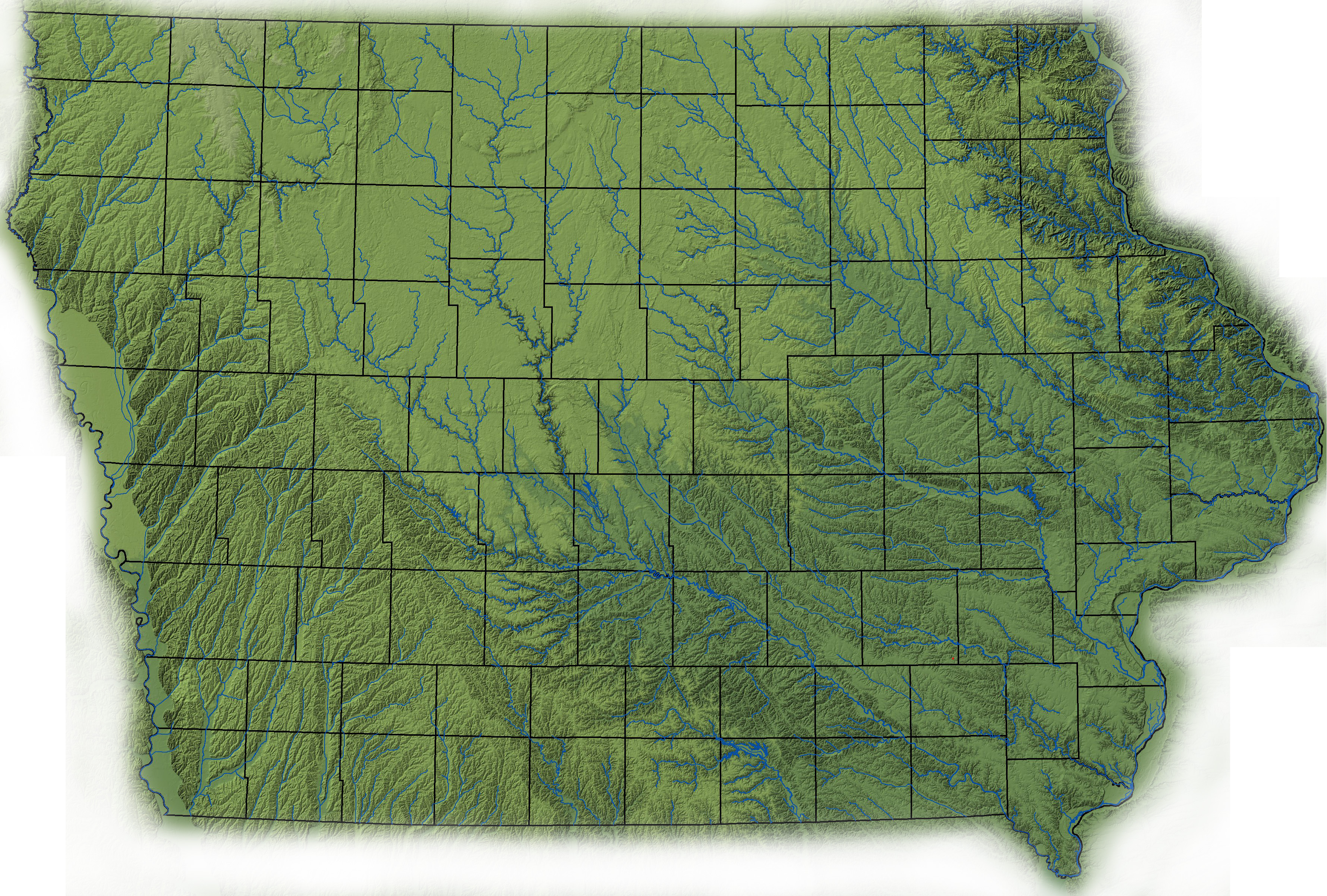
Topography of Iowa, with counties and major streams

The environment of Iowa has been heavily affected by agricultural production since it became a U.S. state in 1846. However, there remain natural areas in Iowa that reflect a wide varieties of environmental niches.

== Ecology and biota ==
Iowa's natural vegetation is tallgrass prairie and savanna in upland areas, with dense forest and wetlands in floodplains and protected river valleys, and pothole wetlands in northern prairie areas. Most of Iowa is used for agriculture, crops cover 60% of the state, grasslands (mostly pasture and hay with some prairie and wetland) cover 30%, and forests cover 7%; urban areas and water cover another 1% each.

=== Presettlement biota ===
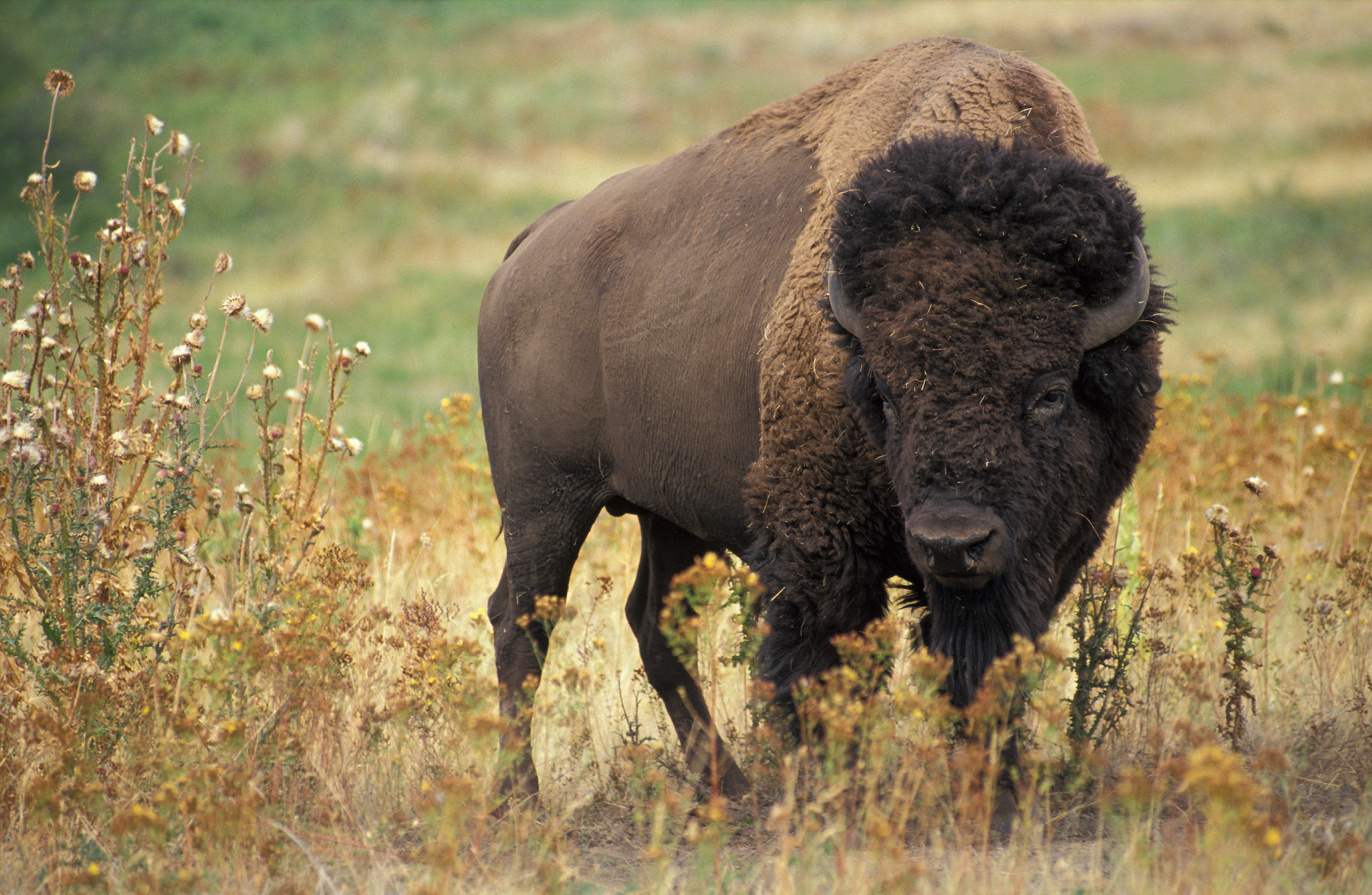
Bison, once common, now found only in captivity in Iowa.

In 1840 Isaac Galland noted a large number of fauna in Iowa, including bison, elk, deer (either white-tailed deer or mule deer), raccoon, fox squirrel, mountain lion, lynx, gray wolf, black wolf, coyote (he called them prairie wolves), bear, beaver, otter, muskrat, mink, rabbits (presumably cottontail rabbit and hare), opossum, skunk, porcupine, groundhog, timber rattlesnake, prairie rattlesnake, bull snake, black snake, water moccasin, garter snake, water snakes, turkey, prairie chicken, quail, swan, geese, brant goose, duck, crane (he called them pelicans), crow, blackbird, bald eagle, "grey eagle" (probably a hawk or falcon), buzzard, raven, mourning dove, passenger pigeon, woodpeckers, woodcocks, hummingbird, and the honeybee. Galland also included a list of edible flora readily available in Iowa, including strawberry, blackberry, raspberry, gooseberry, plum, crabapple, hickory nut, black walnut, butternut, hazelnut, pecan, grape, cherry, black haw, red haw, pawpaw, and cranberry.

The first comprehensive listing of bird species in Iowa was compiled by Charles Rollin Keyes in 1889 which listed 262 species. The first comprehensive listing of mammals in Iowa was made by Herbert Osborne in 1890.

== Natural areas ==
There is a dearth of natural areas in Iowa; less than 1% of the tallgrass prairie that once covered most of Iowa remain intact, only about 5% of the state's prairie pothole wetlands remain, and most of the original forest has been lost. Iowa ranks 49th of U.S. states in public land holdings.

== Threatened and endangered species ==
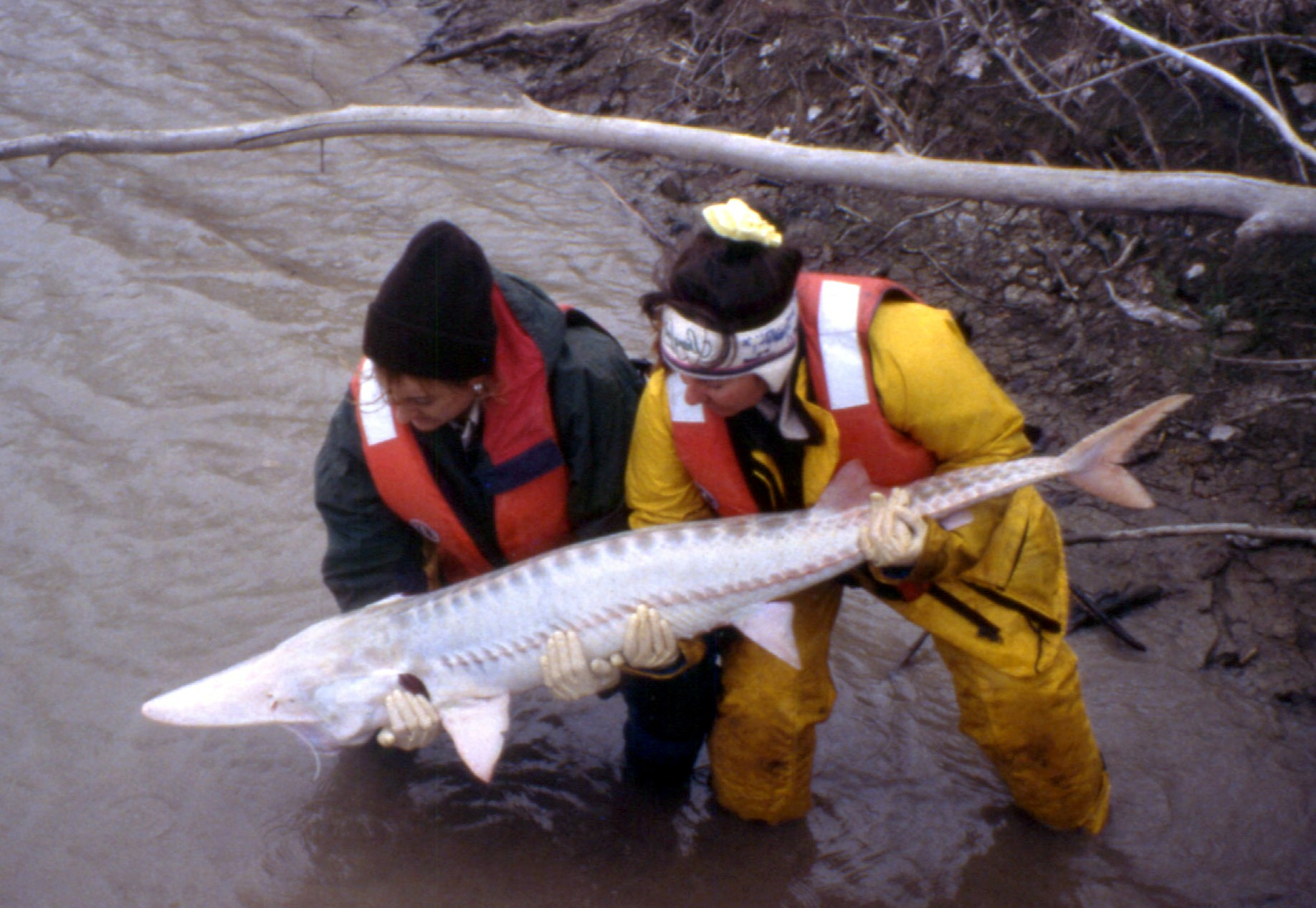
Pallid sturgeon, endangered in Iowa

The United States Fish and Wildlife Service the lists of threatened and endangered species in Iowa have included the following:

Federally endangered animal species:

- Indiana bat (Myotis sodalis)
- Higgins eye pearly mussel (Lampsilis higginsii)
- Topeka shiner (Notropis topeka)
- Iowa Pleistocene snail (Discus macclintocki)
- Pallid sturgeon (Scaphirhynchus albus)
- Least interior tern (Sterna antillarum)
- Whooping crane (Grus americana)
- Sheepnose Mussel (Plethobasus cyphyus)
- Spectaclecase (mussel) (Cumberlandia monodonta)
- Poweshiek Skipperling, (Oarisma poweshiek)

Federally threatened animal species:

- Piping plover (Charadrius melodus), except Great Lakes watershed
- Northern long-eared bat (Myotis septentrionalis)
- Skipper, Dakota (Hesperia dacotae)

Extirpated federally endangered animal species:

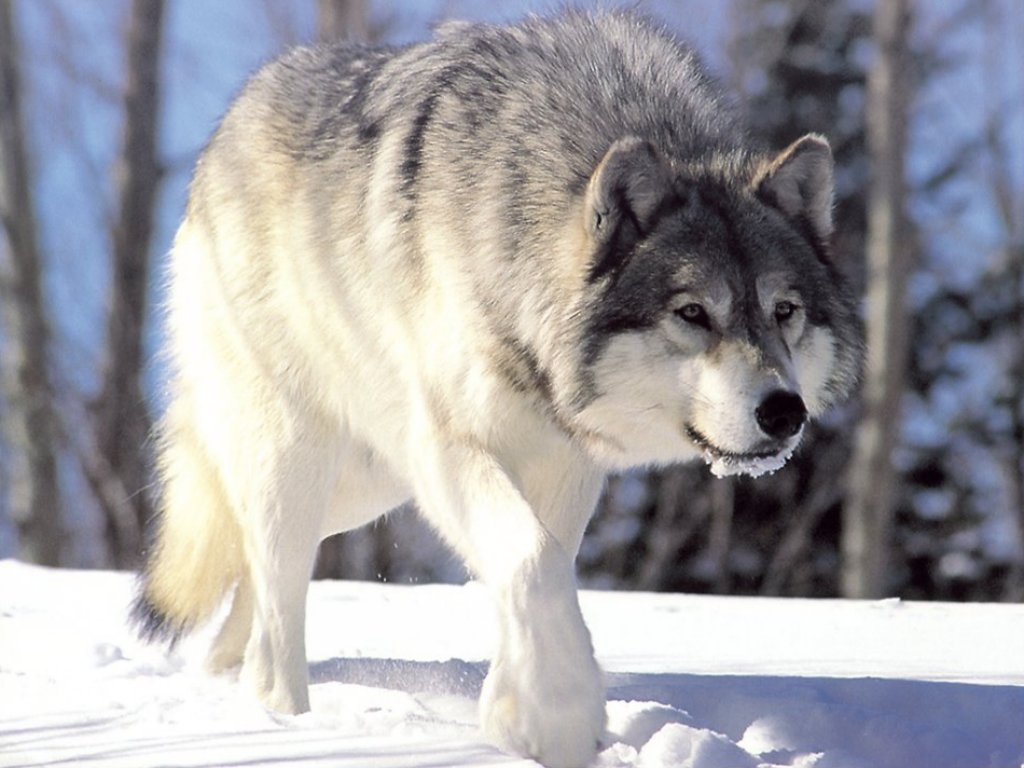
Gray wolf, extirpated from Iowa, but occasionally visits from Minnesota or Wisconsin

Locally extinguished animals are:

- American burying beetle (Nicrophorus americanus)
- Winged mapleleaf mussel (Quadrula fragosa)
- Scaleshell mussel (Leptodea leptodon)
- Orange-footed pimpleback mussel (Plethobasus cooperianus)
- Fat pocketbook pearly mussel (Potamilus capax)
- Gray wolf (Canis lupus)*
- Gray western Great Lakes wolf (Canis lupus)
- Bat, Indiana entire (Myotis sodalis)
- Note: Wolves occasionally reappear in Iowa, roaming south from home ranges in Minnesota and Wisconsin.

Federally threatened plant species:

- Prairie bush-clover (Lespedeza leptostachya)
- Mead's milkweed (Asclepias meadii)
- Northern wild monkshood (Aconitum noveboracense)
- Eastern prairie fringed orchid (Platanthera leucophaea)
- Western prairie fringed orchid (Platanthera praeclara)

The Iowa Department of Natural Resources monitors the status of species considered endangered and threatened within the state, as is required by Chapter 481B of the Code of Iowa.

Extinct animal species (historical):

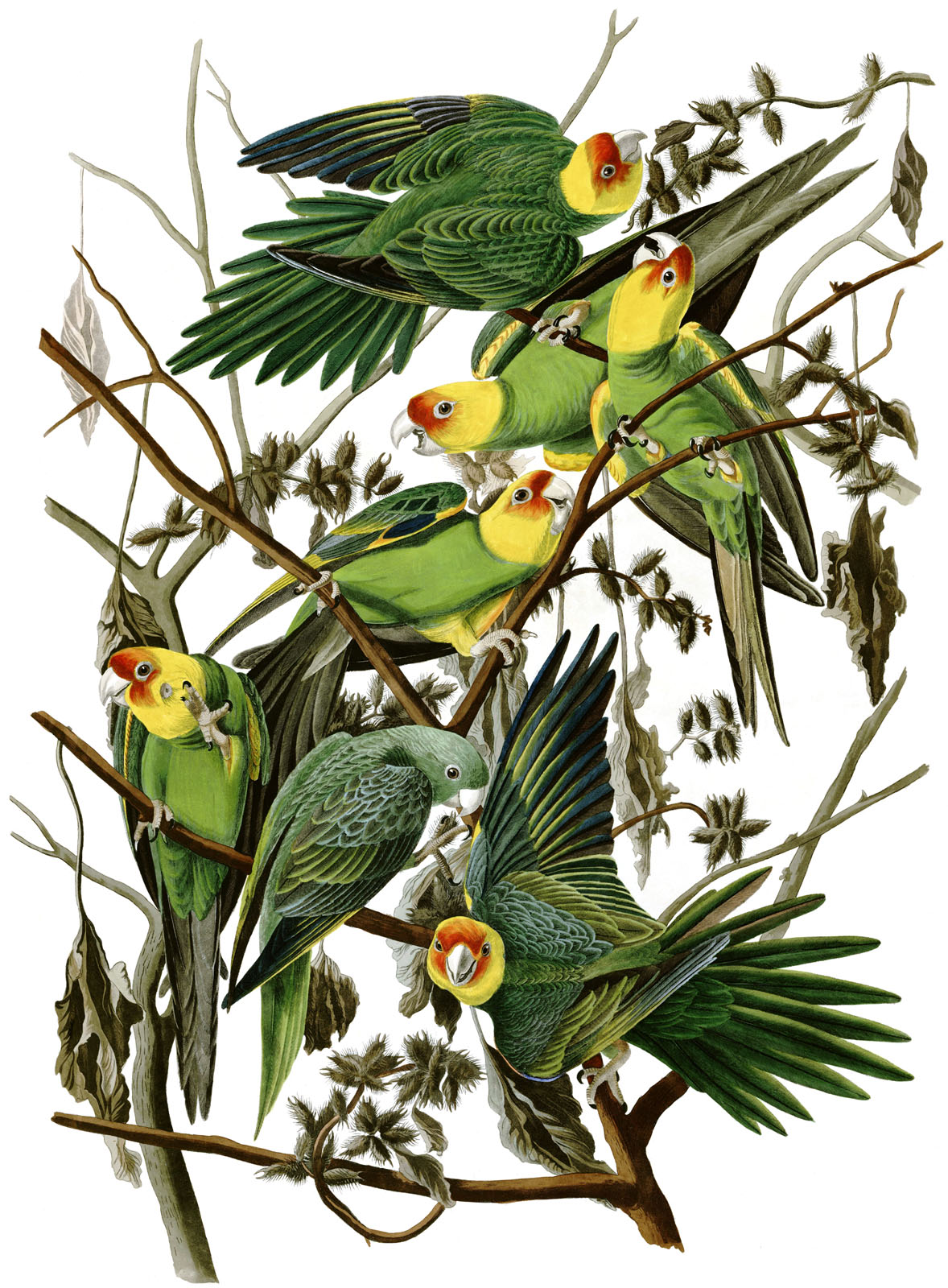
The Carolina parakeet once lived in Iowa, but is now extinct

- Carolina parakeet (Conuropsis carolinensis)
- Passenger pigeon (Ectopistes migratorius)
- Blue pike (Conuropsis carolinensis)
- Eastern elk (Cervus canadensis canadensis)

== Landforms and topography ==
Despite popular perception, Iowa is generally not flat; most of the state consists of rolling hills. Prior divides Iowa into eight landforms based on glaciation, soils, topography, and river drainage:

- The Paleozoic plateau, also known as the Driftless Area, is a region of scenic, high relief landscapes includes such features as resistant, bluff-forming bedrock outcrops, deep V-shaped valleys, caves, springs, and sinkholes. Glacial deposits and loess are thin or absent over most of the region.
- The Des Moines lobe, a remnant of the extensive prairie wetlands that once covered the Des Moines Lobe. Often called the Prairie Pothole Region, the Des Moines Lobe was glaciated up until 12,000 years ago during the Wisconsin glaciation. The area is marked by rolling terrain and ridges. Historically, this area was peppered with small interconnected swamps, most of which were drained for farmland. The Iowa Great Lakes occur along the western edge of the Des Moines lobe.
- The southern Iowa drift plain covers most of the southern half of Iowa. This is probably the most familiar landscape to travelers, since most of Interstate 80 in Iowa runs through the SIDP. The classic Iowa landscape, consisting of rolling hills of Wisconsin-age loess on Illinoian (or earlier) till. The SIDP is some of the most productive agricultural land in the world.
- The Mississippi alluvial plain includes generally level areas of stream terraces, paleochannels, backwater sloughs, and oxbow lakes within the broad Mississippi River valley.
- The Loess Hills consist of very thick deposits of loess in far western Iowa deposited during the Wisconsin and Illinoian periods. Highly eroded, leaving stark, beautiful "golden hills.
- The Iowan surface in northeast Iowa is covered with eroded Illinoian till with moderate loess formation, frequently in the form of paha ridges, muted relief except for steep rolling hills near river valleys, and deeper valleys. These picturesque hills are depicted in many of the landscapes of Grant Wood.
- The northwest Iowa plains are rolling hills consisting of eroded soils developed since pre-Wisconsinan glaciation, but with significant amounts of loess.
- The Missouri alluvial plain is perhaps the only truly flat region of Iowa, the Missouri Alluvial Plain contains areas of terraces, sloughs, and oxbows. Its valley trench is not as deep as the Mississippi River system, and the Missouri River is contained in a much narrower channel. In Iowa, the eastern border of the Missouri Plains is the Loess Hills, forming steep rounded bluffs.

=== Gallery of Iowa landforms ===
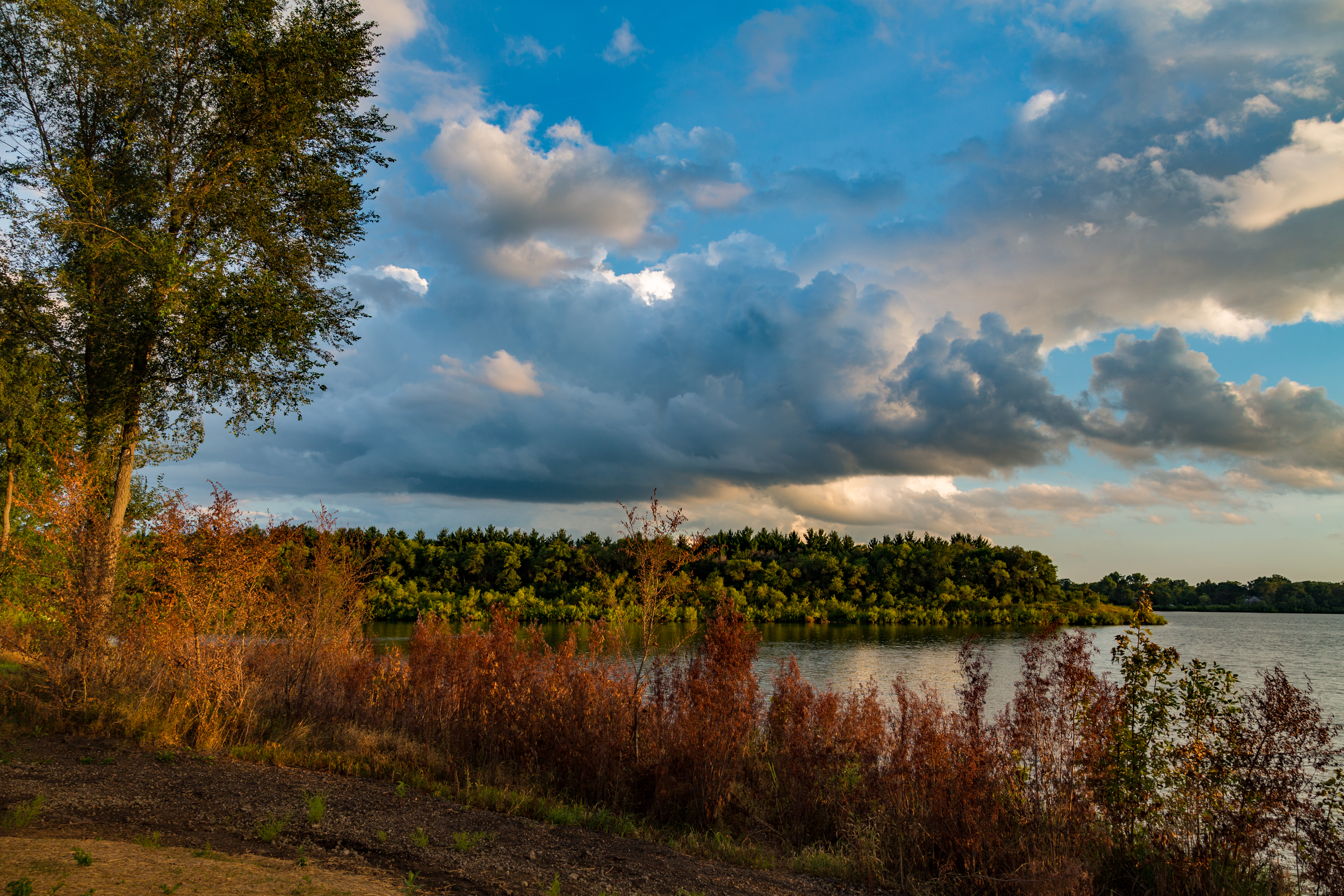
Lake near Cedar Rapids

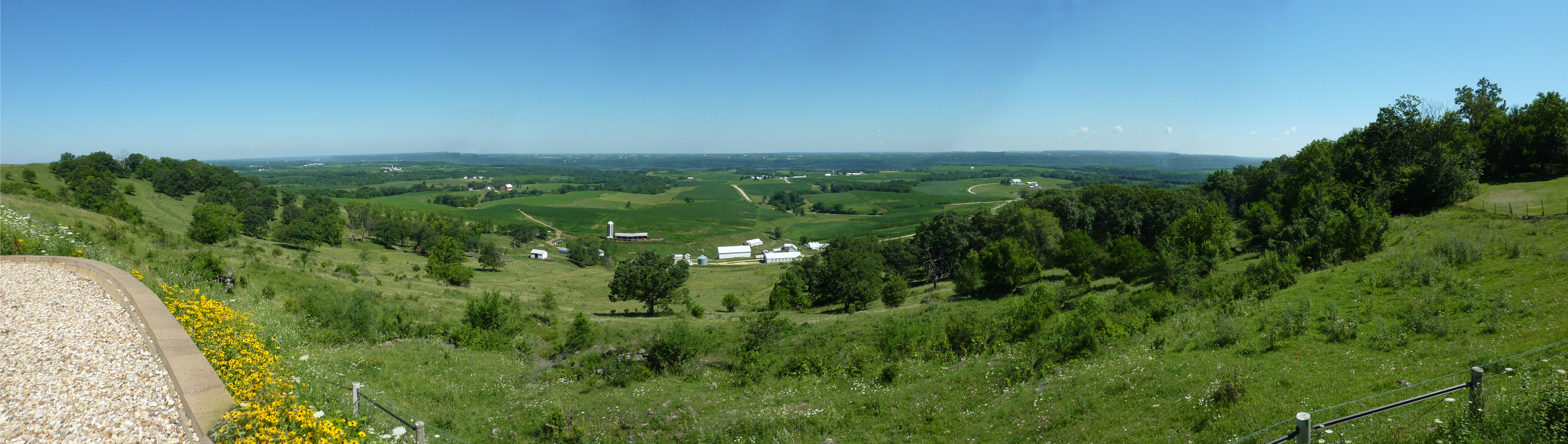
View from Balltown

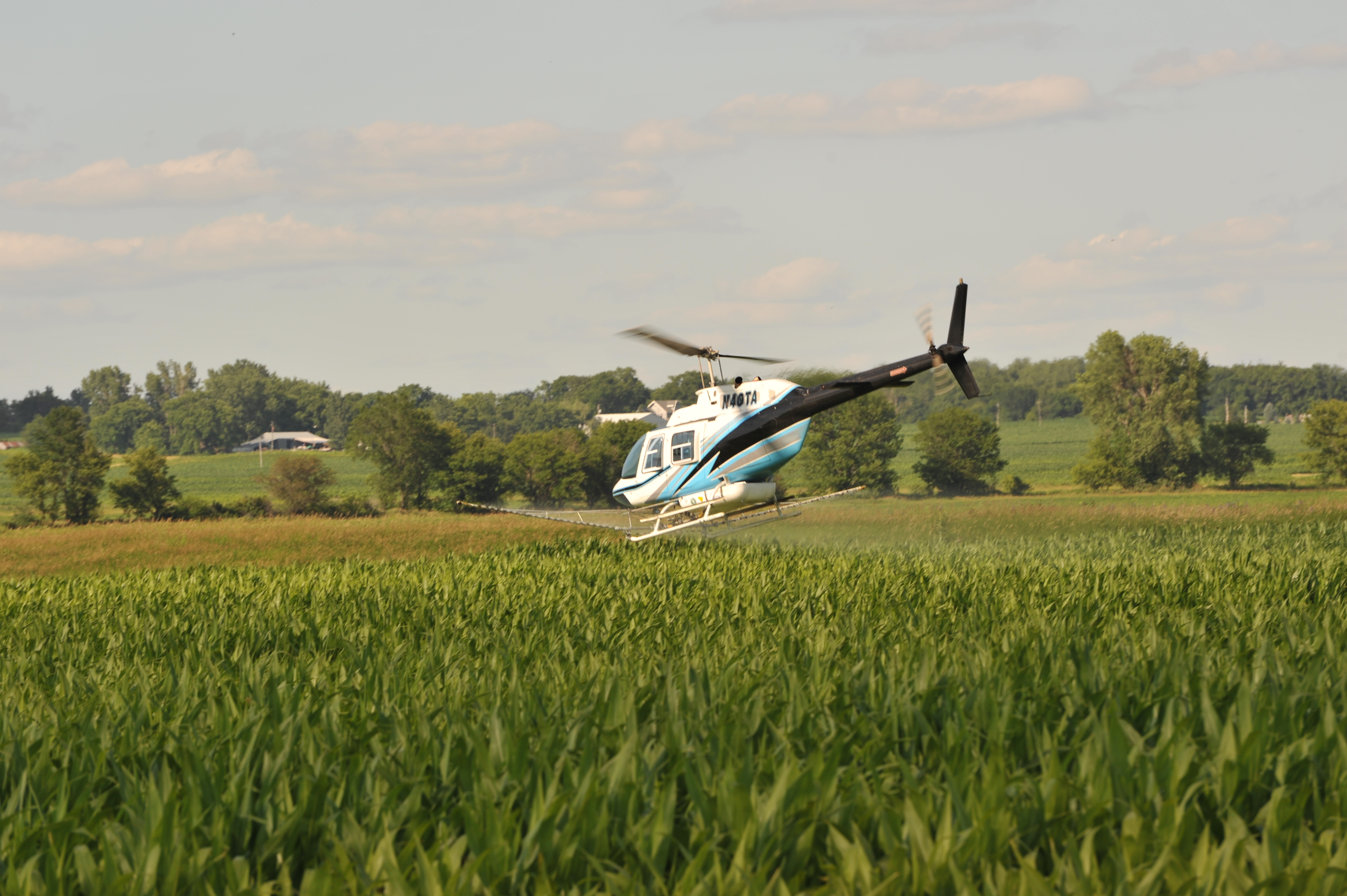
Helicopter over an Iowan cornfield

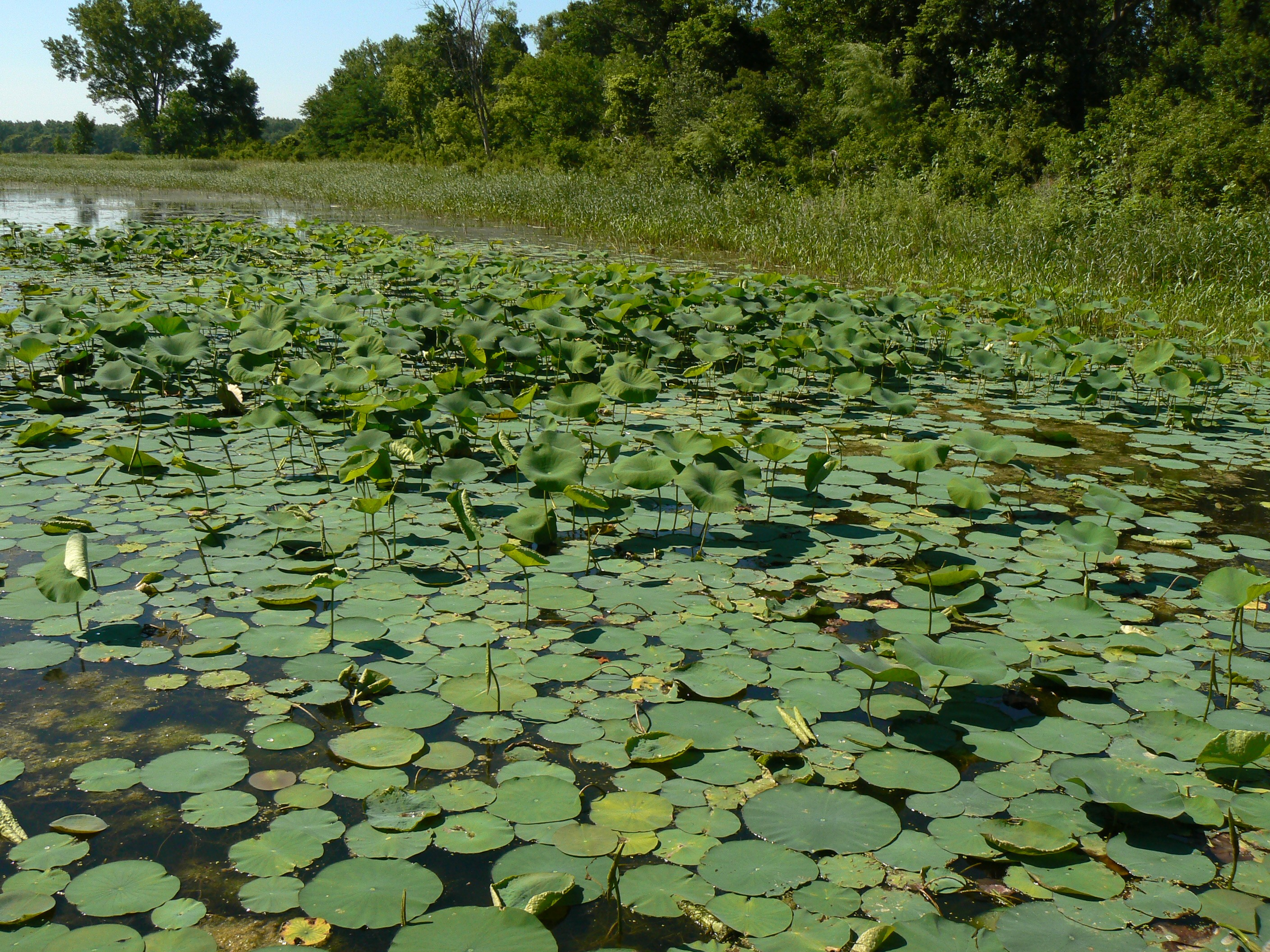
DeSoto National Wildlife Refuge

== Water ==
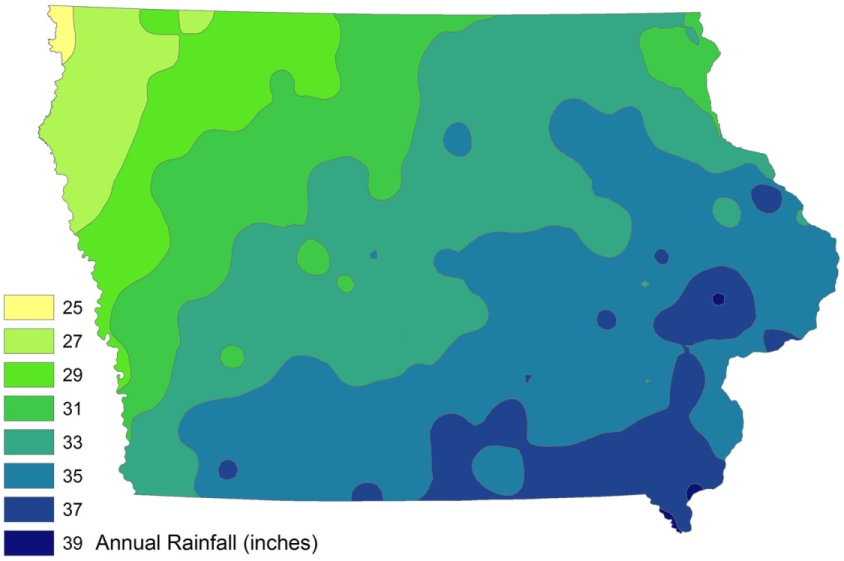
Iowa annual rainfall in inches

As in most of the U.S., surface water in Iowa is not safe to drink untreated, contamination by agricultural runoff including nitrates, herbicides, pesticides, and animal waste being common. Municipal water supplies are typically heavily chlorinated, this chlorine, combined with high nitrate levels, often give municipal water a strong smell, and the limestone bedrock in much of the state causes hard water.

Some communities, such as Iowa City, resort to additional carbon filtration and lime softening coagulation-sedimentation to make the water more palatable. In January 2015, the Des Moines Water Works "sued drainage districts in three northern Iowa counties, claiming the tiles there act as a conduit that accelerates the movement of fertilizer from farm fields into Iowa waterways". Between 2010 and 2015 more than 60 Iowa cities and towns had high nitrate levels in drinking water.

In 2015, there were a record number of beach closures because of harmful algal bloom in Iowa.

== Floods ==
Dubuque, Iowa during the flood of 1965.

Major flood events occurred in Iowa in 1851, 1892, 1965, 1993, 2008. The Great flood of 1851 hit all of Iowa, and almost destroyed the nascent town of Des Moines. "The Des Moines and Raccoon rivers rose to an unprecedented height, inundating the entire country east of the Des Moines river. Crops were utterly destroyed, houses and fences swept away." After the town of Dudley was destroyed, survivors moved to higher ground and founded Carlisle. The flood of 1851 produced record levels on the Iowa River at Iowa City and the Cedar River at Cedar Rapids that stood until the Iowa flood of 2008. The flash flood of 1892 destroyed much of Sioux City. The Flood of 1965 affected eastern Iowa, from Cedar Rapids to Dubuque, with cities along the Mississippi hardest hit. The 1993 floods were widespread across the upper Midwest, causing extensive damage to Coralville and Iowa City.

== Soils ==
The Natural Resources Conservation Service divides Iowa into 23 soil regions. In general, soils of southern, eastern, and western Iowa are loess-derived, while soils of northern and central Iowa are till-derived. Most level areas of Iowa have soils highly suitable for agriculture, making Iowa one of the most productive farming regions of the world.

== Pollution ==
The explosion in the number of high-density livestock facilities in Iowa has led to increased risk of rural water contamination and a perceived decline in air quality. Other factors negatively affecting Iowa's environment include the extensive use of older coal-fired power plants, fertilizer and pesticide runoff from crop production. The impacts of water pollution have raised concerns due to its risks to Iowa's public health and economy.

=== Jordan Aquifer ===
The Jordan Aquifer is the largest source of groundwater, extending from northeast Iowa to south central Iowa, and is the source of much of Iowa's agricultural and industrial water. Besides pollution, the aquifer is threatened by overuse in well-source irrigation, ethanol production, and decreased replenishment caused by extensive field tilling. The aquifer has dropped by as much as 300 feet since the 19th century, resulting in dry wells, disappearance of natural surface springs, and decrease of water quality.

== Climate statistics for selected cities ==
Climate data for Des Moines International Airport, Iowa (1991–2020 normals, (Note: Mean monthly maxima and minima (i.e. the expected highest and lowest temperature readings at any point during the year or given month) calculated based on data at said location from 1991 to 2020.) extremes 1878–present (Note: Official records for Des Moines kept August 1878 to August 1939 at downtown and at Des Moines International since September 1939. For more information, see Threadex))
Month	Jan	Feb	Mar	Apr	May	Jun	Jul	Aug	Sep	Oct	Nov	Dec	Year
Record high °F (°C)	67 (19)	78 (26)	91 (33)	93 (34)	105 (41)	103 (39)	110 (43)	110 (43)	101 (38)	95 (35)	82 (28)	74 (23)	110 (43)
Mean maximum °F (°C)	53.4 (11.9)	58.7 (14.8)	74.6 (23.7)	83.9 (28.8)	88.9 (31.6)	93.1 (33.9)	96.2 (35.7)	94.4 (34.7)	91.3 (32.9)	83.3 (28.5)	70.4 (21.3)	57.8 (14.3)	97.4 (36.3)
Mean daily maximum °F (°C)	30.9 (−0.6)	35.7 (2.1)	49.2 (9.6)	62.0 (16.7)	72.4 (22.4)	81.9 (27.7)	85.6 (29.8)	83.6 (28.7)	76.9 (24.9)	63.4 (17.4)	48.3 (9.1)	35.9 (2.2)	60.5 (15.8)
Daily mean °F (°C)	22.3 (−5.4)	26.9 (−2.8)	39.4 (4.1)	51.3 (10.7)	62.4 (16.9)	72.2 (22.3)	76.0 (24.4)	73.9 (23.3)	66.2 (19.0)	53.2 (11.8)	39.3 (4.1)	27.7 (−2.4)	50.9 (10.5)
Mean daily minimum °F (°C)	13.8 (−10.1)	18.0 (−7.8)	29.6 (−1.3)	40.6 (4.8)	52.3 (11.3)	62.4 (16.9)	66.4 (19.1)	64.2 (17.9)	55.4 (13.0)	42.9 (6.1)	30.2 (−1.0)	19.5 (−6.9)	41.3 (5.2)
Mean minimum °F (°C)	−7.8 (−22.1)	−2.7 (−19.3)	9.2 (−12.7)	24.9 (−3.9)	37.6 (3.1)	50.2 (10.1)	56.9 (13.8)	54.8 (12.7)	40.4 (4.7)	26.8 (−2.9)	12.6 (−10.8)	−1.2 (−18.4)	−11.4 (−24.1)
Record low °F (°C)	−30 (−34)	−26 (−32)	−22 (−30)	9 (−13)	26 (−3)	37 (3)	47 (8)	40 (4)	26 (−3)	7 (−14)	−10 (−23)	−22 (−30)	−30 (−34)
Average precipitation inches (mm)	1.08 (27)	1.34 (34)	2.17 (55)	4.02 (102)	5.24 (133)	5.26 (134)	3.82 (97)	4.17 (106)	3.18 (81)	2.78 (71)	1.91 (49)	1.58 (40)	36.55 (928)
Average snowfall inches (cm)	9.4 (24)	10.2 (26)	4.4 (11)	1.2 (3.0)	0.2 (0.51)	0.0 (0.0)	0.0 (0.0)	0.0 (0.0)	0.0 (0.0)	0.5 (1.3)	2.7 (6.9)	7.9 (20)	36.5 (93)
Average extreme snow depth inches (cm)	6.9 (18)	7.4 (19)	4.2 (11)	0.8 (2.0)	0.2 (0.51)	0.0 (0.0)	0.0 (0.0)	0.0 (0.0)	0.0 (0.0)	0.3 (0.76)	1.7 (4.3)	4.9 (12)	10.3 (26)
Average precipitation days (≥ 0.01 in)	8.2	8.4	9.5	11.5	12.7	11.7	9.5	9.4	8.2	8.6	7.7	7.8	113.2
Average snowy days (≥ 0.1 in)	6.9	6.3	3.1	1.0	0.1	0.0	0.0	0.0	0.0	0.5	1.8	5.6	25.3
Average relative humidity (%)	71.0	71.3	67.9	63.2	63.0	64.8	67.7	70.0	70.9	66.5	71.0	74.6	68.5
Mean monthly sunshine hours	157.7	163.3	206.0	222.2	276.0	312.1	337.8	297.9	239.8	210.0	138.5	129.2	2,690.4
Percentage possible sunshine	53	55	56	56	61	69	73	70	64	61	47	45	60
Average ultraviolet index	1	2	4	6	8	9	9	8	6	4	2	1	5
Source 1: NOAA (relative humidity and sun 1961−1990)
Source 2: Weather Atlas (UV)

Climate data for Quad Cities (Quad City International Airport), 1991–2020 normals, (Note: Mean monthly maxima and minima (i.e. the expected highest and lowest temperature readings at any point during the year or given month) calculated based on data at said location from 1991 to 2020.) extremes 1871–present (Note: Official precipitation records for the Quad Cities kept at the Weather Bureau Office (WBO) in Davenport, Iowa from July 1871 to December 1931, alternating between Quad City Int'l (KMLI) and the Davenport WBO from January 1932 to 17 February 1937, and remaining at KMLI since 18 February 1937. Temperature, snowfall, and snow depth records date to 1 January 1874, 1 August 1882, and 1 January 1901, respectively. For more information, see Threadex)
Month	Jan	Feb	Mar	Apr	May	Jun	Jul	Aug	Sep	Oct	Nov	Dec	Year
Record high °F (°C)	69 (21)	79 (26)	88 (31)	93 (34)	104 (40)	104 (40)	111 (44)	106 (41)	100 (38)	95 (35)	80 (27)	75 (24)	111 (44)
Mean maximum °F (°C)	53.4 (11.9)	57.6 (14.2)	73.6 (23.1)	82.7 (28.2)	89.2 (31.8)	94.0 (34.4)	95.1 (35.1)	93.8 (34.3)	91.2 (32.9)	84.1 (28.9)	69.8 (21.0)	57.6 (14.2)	96.9 (36.1)
Mean daily maximum °F (°C)	31.8 (−0.1)	36.6 (2.6)	49.9 (9.9)	63.0 (17.2)	73.9 (23.3)	83.1 (28.4)	86.1 (30.1)	84.1 (28.9)	77.9 (25.5)	64.8 (18.2)	49.8 (9.9)	37.0 (2.8)	61.5 (16.4)
Daily mean °F (°C)	23.3 (−4.8)	27.7 (−2.4)	39.7 (4.3)	51.4 (10.8)	62.5 (16.9)	72.1 (22.3)	75.5 (24.2)	73.4 (23.0)	66.1 (18.9)	53.7 (12.1)	40.4 (4.7)	28.9 (−1.7)	51.2 (10.7)
Mean daily minimum °F (°C)	14.8 (−9.6)	18.8 (−7.3)	29.6 (−1.3)	39.9 (4.4)	51.1 (10.6)	61.0 (16.1)	64.9 (18.3)	62.7 (17.1)	54.2 (12.3)	42.6 (5.9)	30.9 (−0.6)	20.8 (−6.2)	40.9 (4.9)
Mean minimum °F (°C)	−9.4 (−23.0)	−2.3 (−19.1)	9.6 (−12.4)	24.7 (−4.1)	35.2 (1.8)	48.0 (8.9)	54.0 (12.2)	52.1 (11.2)	39.1 (3.9)	26.3 (−3.2)	14.1 (−9.9)	−0.2 (−17.9)	−14.2 (−25.7)
Record low °F (°C)	−33 (−36)	−28 (−33)	−19 (−28)	7 (−14)	25 (−4)	39 (4)	46 (8)	40 (4)	24 (−4)	11 (−12)	−10 (−23)	−24 (−31)	−33 (−36)
Average precipitation inches (mm)	1.66 (42)	1.83 (46)	2.62 (67)	3.81 (97)	4.67 (119)	5.01 (127)	4.23 (107)	3.97 (101)	3.32 (84)	2.81 (71)	2.30 (58)	2.04 (52)	38.27 (972)
Average snowfall inches (cm)	10.8 (27)	8.6 (22)	4.4 (11)	1.1 (2.8)	0.0 (0.0)	0.0 (0.0)	0.0 (0.0)	0.0 (0.0)	0.0 (0.0)	0.3 (0.76)	2.1 (5.3)	8.8 (22)	36.1 (92)
Average precipitation days (≥ 0.01 in)	9.3	8.7	10.4	11.3	12.2	11.3	8.6	9.4	8.4	9.0	8.9	9.5	117.0
Average snowy days (≥ 0.1 in)	7.2	6.0	3.2	0.8	0.0	0.0	0.0	0.0	0.0	0.3	1.7	5.9	25.1
Average relative humidity (%)	69.9	69.8	68.3	64.3	64.9	65.8	70.5	73.3	72.8	68.1	71.3	74.0	69.4
Average dew point °F (°C)	11.7 (−11.3)	16.2 (−8.8)	27.0 (−2.8)	37.2 (2.9)	48.2 (9.0)	57.9 (14.4)	64.0 (17.8)	62.6 (17.0)	54.3 (12.4)	41.5 (5.3)	30.4 (−0.9)	18.3 (−7.6)	39.1 (3.9)
Mean monthly sunshine hours	148.1	153.8	180.5	210.1	255.1	284.6	301.9	271.4	222.0	192.9	121.7	113.9	2,456
Percentage possible sunshine	50	52	49	53	57	63	66	63	59	56	41	40	55
Source: NOAA (relative humidity, dew point, and sun 1961−1990)

Climate data for Sioux City, Iowa (Sioux Gateway Airport), 1991–2020 normals, extremes 1889–present
Month	Jan	Feb	Mar	Apr	May	Jun	Jul	Aug	Sep	Oct	Nov	Dec	Year
Record high °F (°C)	71 (22)	75 (24)	95 (35)	98 (37)	106 (41)	108 (42)	111 (44)	108 (42)	103 (39)	96 (36)	82 (28)	71 (22)	111 (44)
Mean maximum °F (°C)	52.2 (11.2)	57.9 (14.4)	74.7 (23.7)	85.7 (29.8)	92.5 (33.6)	95.4 (35.2)	95.3 (35.2)	94.1 (34.5)	91.6 (33.1)	85.3 (29.6)	70.3 (21.3)	54.4 (12.4)	98.3 (36.8)
Mean daily maximum °F (°C)	29.5 (−1.4)	34.2 (1.2)	47.6 (8.7)	61.1 (16.2)	72.3 (22.4)	81.9 (27.7)	85.0 (29.4)	82.6 (28.1)	76.6 (24.8)	62.8 (17.1)	46.8 (8.2)	33.4 (0.8)	59.5 (15.3)
Daily mean °F (°C)	20.0 (−6.7)	24.5 (−4.2)	36.7 (2.6)	48.9 (9.4)	60.5 (15.8)	70.7 (21.5)	74.2 (23.4)	71.7 (22.1)	63.9 (17.7)	50.3 (10.2)	35.9 (2.2)	24.1 (−4.4)	48.4 (9.1)
Mean daily minimum °F (°C)	10.4 (−12.0)	14.8 (−9.6)	25.9 (−3.4)	36.7 (2.6)	48.7 (9.3)	59.4 (15.2)	63.4 (17.4)	60.8 (16.0)	51.2 (10.7)	37.9 (3.3)	25.0 (−3.9)	14.8 (−9.6)	37.4 (3.0)
Mean minimum °F (°C)	−12.1 (−24.5)	−6.8 (−21.6)	4.1 (−15.5)	20.0 (−6.7)	33.4 (0.8)	46.3 (7.9)	51.2 (10.7)	49.2 (9.6)	34.3 (1.3)	20.2 (−6.6)	7.0 (−13.9)	−6.9 (−21.6)	−16.1 (−26.7)
Record low °F (°C)	−35 (−37)	−31 (−35)	−22 (−30)	−2 (−19)	23 (−5)	38 (3)	41 (5)	37 (3)	24 (−4)	5 (−15)	−9 (−23)	−28 (−33)	−35 (−37)
Average precipitation inches (mm)	0.69 (18)	0.86 (22)	1.76 (45)	3.15 (80)	3.87 (98)	4.35 (110)	3.35 (85)	3.94 (100)	2.84 (72)	2.20 (56)	1.27 (32)	0.99 (25)	29.27 (743)
Average snowfall inches (cm)	7.7 (20)	8.7 (22)	5.7 (14)	2.3 (5.8)	0.0 (0.0)	0.0 (0.0)	0.0 (0.0)	0.0 (0.0)	0.0 (0.0)	0.8 (2.0)	3.2 (8.1)	7.6 (19)	36.0 (91)
Average precipitation days (≥ 0.01 in)	6.8	6.5	8.1	10.0	12.0	11.7	9.0	9.8	8.0	7.6	5.9	6.8	102.2
Average snowy days (≥ 0.1 in)	5.9	5.7	3.4	1.4	0.0	0.0	0.0	0.0	0.0	0.5	2.5	5.4	24.8
Average relative humidity (%)	72.2	72.4	69.7	61.6	62.3	65.5	69.2	72.0	70.8	66.2	72.3	75.9	69.2
Mean monthly sunshine hours	171.1	165.5	211.9	232.3	271.8	310.2	330.9	292.9	235.5	209.3	146.4	138.3	2,716.1
Percentage possible sunshine	58	56	57	58	60	68	71	68	63	61	50	49	61
Source: NOAA (relative humidity and sun 1961–1990)
