= Black haw =

Black haw is a common name for several woody plants and may refer to:

- Sideroxylon lanuginosum
- Viburnum lentago, native to North America
- Viburnum prunifolium
- Viburnum rufidulum (Rusty blackhaw)
