= Coleophora viburniella =

Scientific classification
- Kingdom: Animalia
- Phylum: Arthropoda
- Clade: Pancrustacea
- Class: Insecta
- Order: Lepidoptera
- Family: Coleophoridae
- Genus: Coleophora
- Species: C. viburniella

Binomial name
- Coleophora viburniella Clemens, 1861

Species of moth

Coleophora viburniella is a moth of the family Coleophoridae. It is found in the United States, including Pennsylvania and Ohio.

The larvae feed on the leaves of Viburnum prunifolium and Viburnum cassinoides. They create a composite leaf case.
