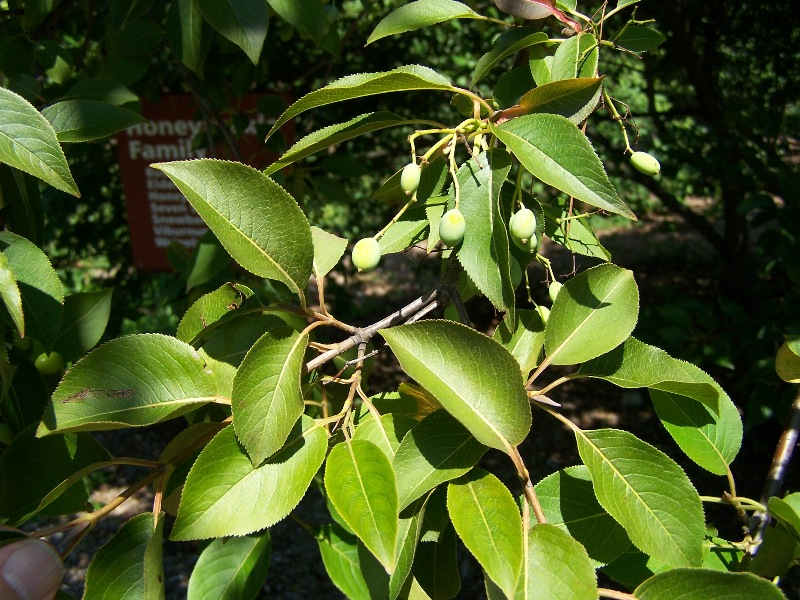
- Specimen at Morton Arboretum; Acc. 415-82-1

Scientific classification
- Kingdom: Plantae
- Clade: Tracheophytes
- Clade: Angiosperms
- Clade: Eudicots
- Clade: Asterids
- Order: Dipsacales
- Family: Viburnaceae
- Genus: Viburnum
- Species: V. × jackii

Binomial name
- Viburnum × jackii Rehder

= Viburnum × jackii =

Species of flowering plant

Viburnum × jackii (Jack's viburnum) is a viburnum of cultivated origin. It is a hybrid between Viburnum lentago and Viburnum prunifolium. It is a deciduous shrub intermediate between its parents, growing to 8 m tall.
