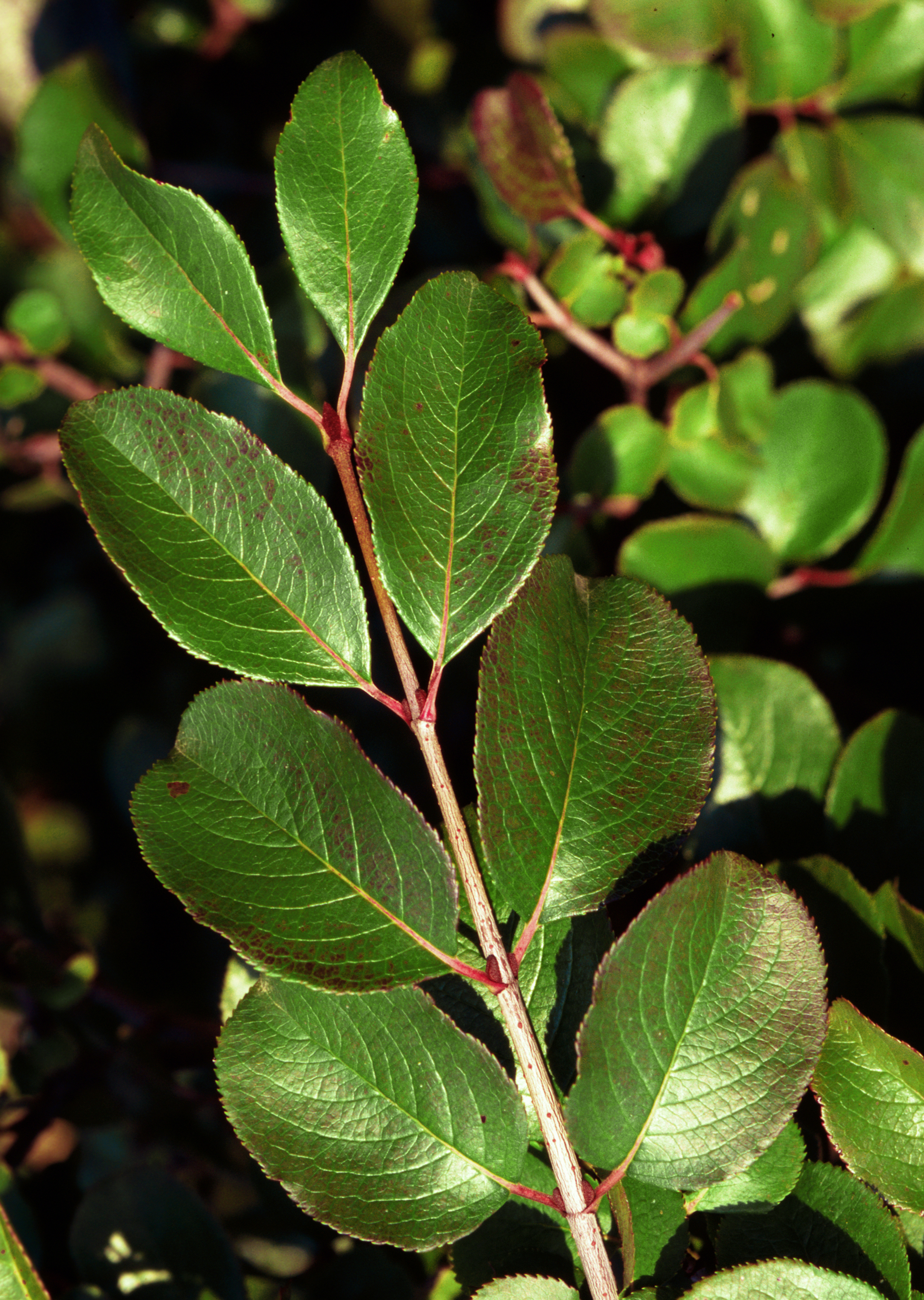

Conservation status
- Least Concern (IUCN 3.1)

Scientific classification
- Kingdom: Plantae
- Clade: Tracheophytes
- Clade: Angiosperms
- Clade: Eudicots
- Clade: Asterids
- Order: Dipsacales
- Family: Adoxaceae
- Genus: Viburnum
- Species: V. rufidulum

Binomial name
- Viburnum rufidulum Raf.
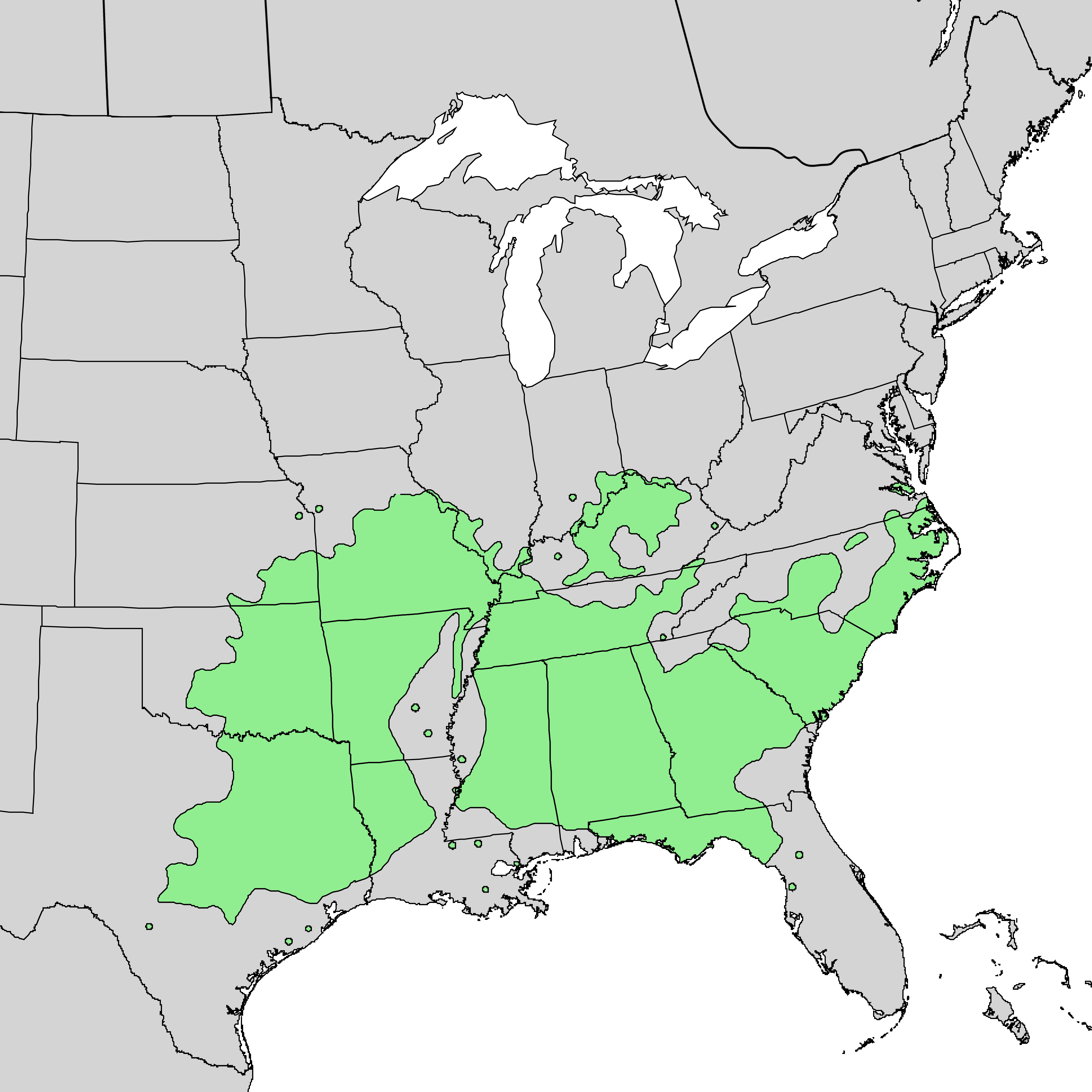
- Generalized natural range of Viburnum rufidulum

= Viburnum rufidulum =

Species of shrub

Viburnum rufidulum, also known as the rusty blackhaw, blue haw, rusty nanny-berry, or southern black haw, is a flowering species of shrub or small tree that is common in parts of the Eastern and Central United States. It produces attractive flowers and fall foliage, as well as fruits that are popular with some species of bird.

== Description ==
Leathery deciduous leaves are simple and grow in opposite blades ranging from 0.5-3 inches in length and 1-1.5 inches in width. Petioles are "rusty hairy" with grooves and sometimes wings. Leaf margins are serrate. Autumn leaf colors are bronze to red.

Twigs range in color from "reddish brown to gray"; young twigs are hairy, and get smoother with age.

Bark is similar that of the flowering dogwood, ranging in color from "reddish brown to almost black" and forming "blocky plates on larger trunks".

Viburnum rufidulum blooms in April to May with creamy white flowers that are bisexual, or perfect and similar to those of other Viburnum species, but with clusters as large as six inches wide.

The fruits are purple or dark blue, glaucous, globose or ellipsoid drupes that mature in mid to late summer. The edible fruit has been said to taste like raisins and attract birds.

It is similar to Viburnum prunifolium (blackhaw). Petioles of V. prunifolium do not have the rusty hairs that those of V. rufidulum do.

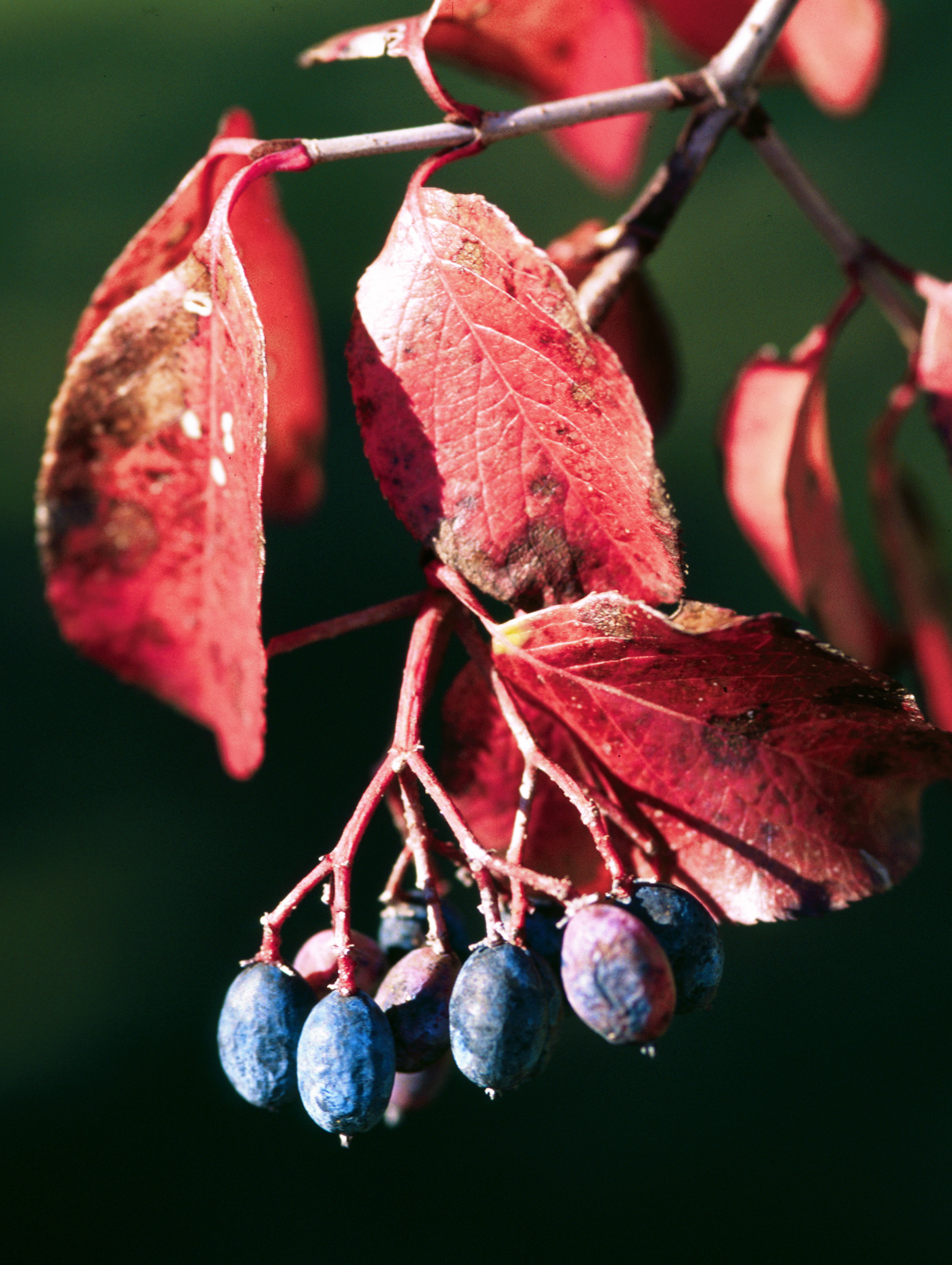
Viburnum rufidulum fruit

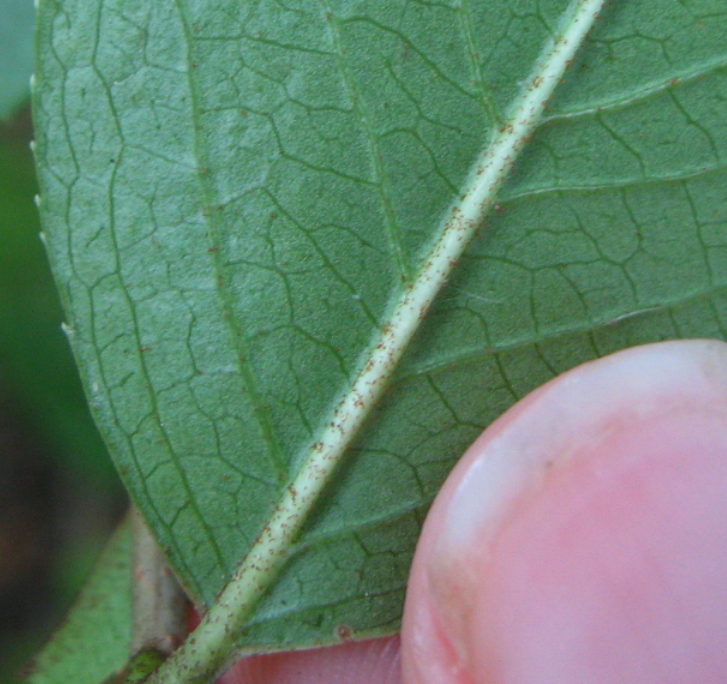
Rusty hairs on the leaf underside are a diagnostic characteristic of this species

== Distribution and habitat ==
The rusty blackhaw prefers dry habitats with elevations generally below 750 m.

It grows in Alabama, Arkansas, Florida, Georgia, Illinois, Indiana, Kansas, Kentucky, Louisiana, Mississippi, Missouri, North Carolina, Ohio, Oklahoma, South Carolina, Tennessee, Texas, Virginia, and West Virginia.

V. rufidulum often occurs in loamy sand environments. Individuals have been observed in habitats such as upland woods, deciduous woods, and palm hammocks.

== Uses ==
It is occasionally used as an ornamental plant.
