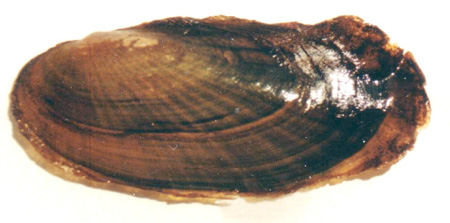

Conservation status
- Near Threatened (IUCN 2.3)

- Critically Imperiled (NatureServe)

Scientific classification
- Kingdom: Animalia
- Phylum: Mollusca
- Class: Bivalvia
- Order: Unionida
- Family: Unionidae
- Genus: Potamilus
- Species: P. leptodon

Binomial name
- Potamilus leptodon (Rafinesque, 1820)

Synonyms
- Leptodea leptodon (Rafinesque, 1820)

= Potamilus leptodon =

Species of bivalve

Potamilus leptodon, the scaleshell mussel or scale shell, is a species of freshwater mussel in the family Unionidae, the river mussels. This aquatic bivalve mollusk has disappeared from much of its historical range. It is endemic to the United States, where it is now present in four or fewer states; it is only found with any regularity in Missouri. It is a federally listed endangered species of the United States.

== Description ==
This mussel is generally up to 10 centimeters long but old individuals may reach 12 centimeters. The shell is very thin and translucent in parts, and is yellowish, greenish, or brownish in color. The nacre is very iridescent and is blue or purple in color with a pinkish or copper tinge. The species is sexually dimorphic, with males having a pointed posterior end and females having a ruffled end.

== Distribution and habitat ==
This mussel had a historical distribution in 56 rivers in 13 states throughout the Mississippi River drainage: Alabama, Arkansas, Illinois, Indiana, Iowa, Kentucky, Minnesota, Missouri, Ohio, Oklahoma, South Dakota, Tennessee, and Wisconsin. While it had a widespread distribution, it was considered rare throughout its range. Today it is considered extirpated from nine of these states, with scattered occurrences remaining in Missouri, South Dakota, Arkansas, and Oklahoma. It has been seen in 18 rivers in the last 25 years. The largest known populations, which are very small and isolated, are in the Meramec, Bourbeuse, and Gasconade Rivers of Missouri.

This mussel inhabits medium-sized to large rivers and can be found in riffles with a slow or moderate current. It often buries itself a few centimeters deep in the substrate, which may be sand, gravel, rocks, or mud. It can be found among other species of mussels in the few remaining fragments of appropriate habitat.

Most freshwater mussels reproduce by releasing their larvae, called glochidia, into the water, where they are then taken in by fish. The glochidia lodge in the gills or fins of the fish and develop into juvenile mussels encysted in the fish tissue. They then drop off the fish into the substrate. Little is known about how this species transfers its glochidia to fish hosts, but it may occur when the adult female is eaten by the fish. The fish host for this mussel species is the freshwater drum (Aplodinotus grunniens).

The main threat to this species is the loss and degradation of its habitat. Channelization and impoundment of the river systems have eliminated large areas of habitat. Increased sedimentation and pollution have degraded remaining areas. The best populations on the Meramec River are threatened by pollution from lead mining. Sand mining and dredging kill individuals. Riverbank erosion removes strips of habitat and may increase sedimentation and pollution.

== Sources ==
- Bogan, A.E. (1996). "Leptodea leptodon". IUCN Red List of Threatened Species. 1996 e.T11685A3301411. doi:10.2305/IUCN.UK.1996.RLTS.T11685A3301411.en.
