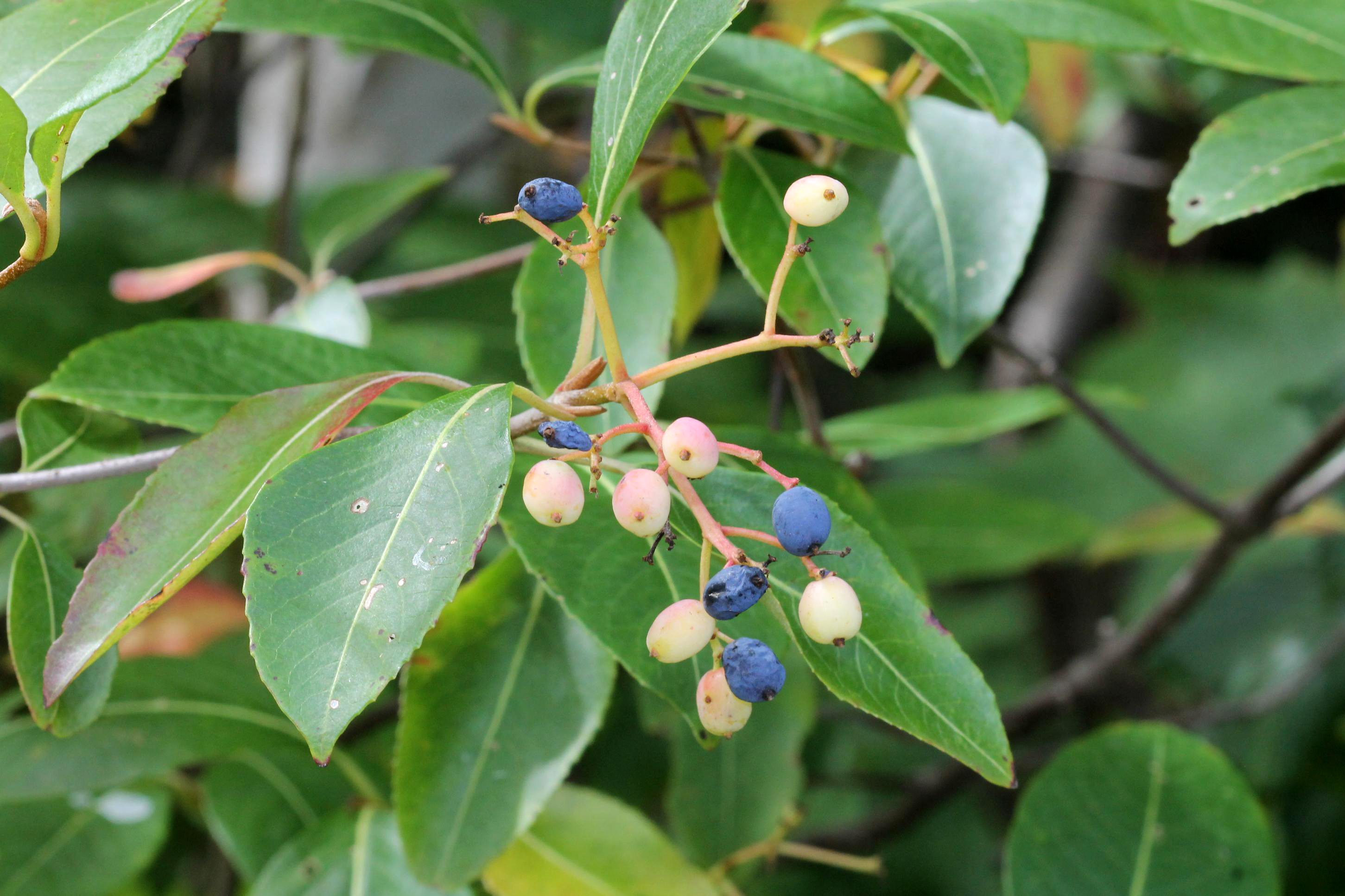

Conservation status
- Secure (NatureServe)

Scientific classification
- Kingdom: Plantae
- Clade: Tracheophytes
- Clade: Angiosperms
- Clade: Eudicots
- Clade: Asterids
- Order: Dipsacales
- Family: Adoxaceae
- Genus: Viburnum
- Species: V. cassinoides

Binomial name
- Viburnum cassinoides L.

= Viburnum cassinoides =

Species of shrub

Viburnum cassinoides, commonly known as northern wild raisin, blue haw, witherod viburnum, or swamp haw, is a deciduous shrub native to eastern North America in the viburnum family, Viburnaceae (also referred to as Adoxaceae). It is often synonymized with Viburnum nudum var. cassinoides.

== Description ==
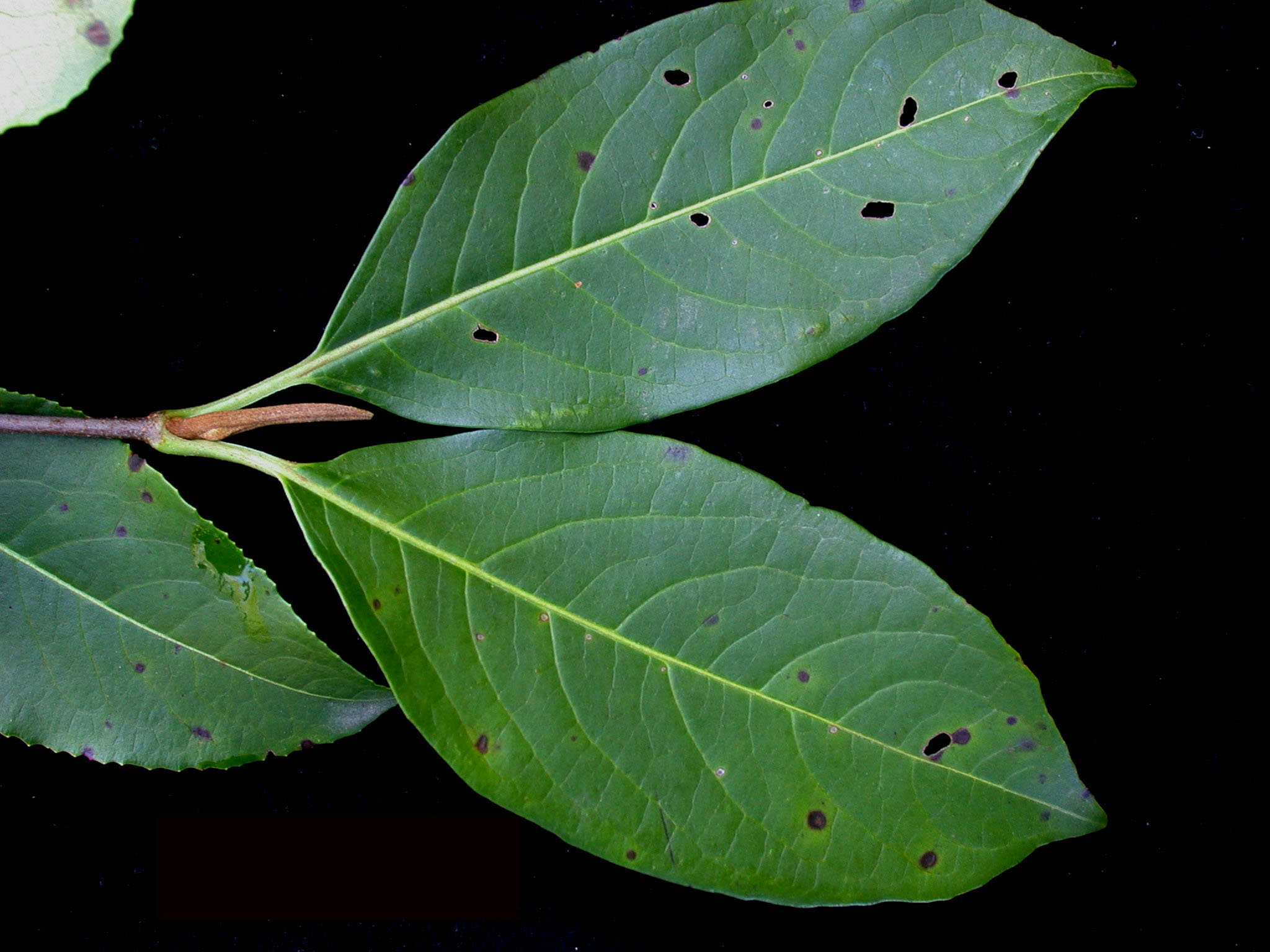
Leaves with entire margins, not lightly toothed as typical for Viburnum cassinoides

Viburnum cassinoides most often grows as a dense multi-stemmed shrub with a rounded crown, typically to heights of 5–6 ft (1.5-1.8 m). Its leaves are simple, opposite, ovate to broadly lanceolate, about 2–4 in (2.5–10 cm) long and have lightly toothed margins. Moreover, its lateral leaf buds are brown and particularly narrow (technically lanceoloid), whereas its apical flower buds have an inflated base. Both bud types are covered by 2 scales and rest above V-shaped leaf scars that each encompass 3 vascular bundle scars.

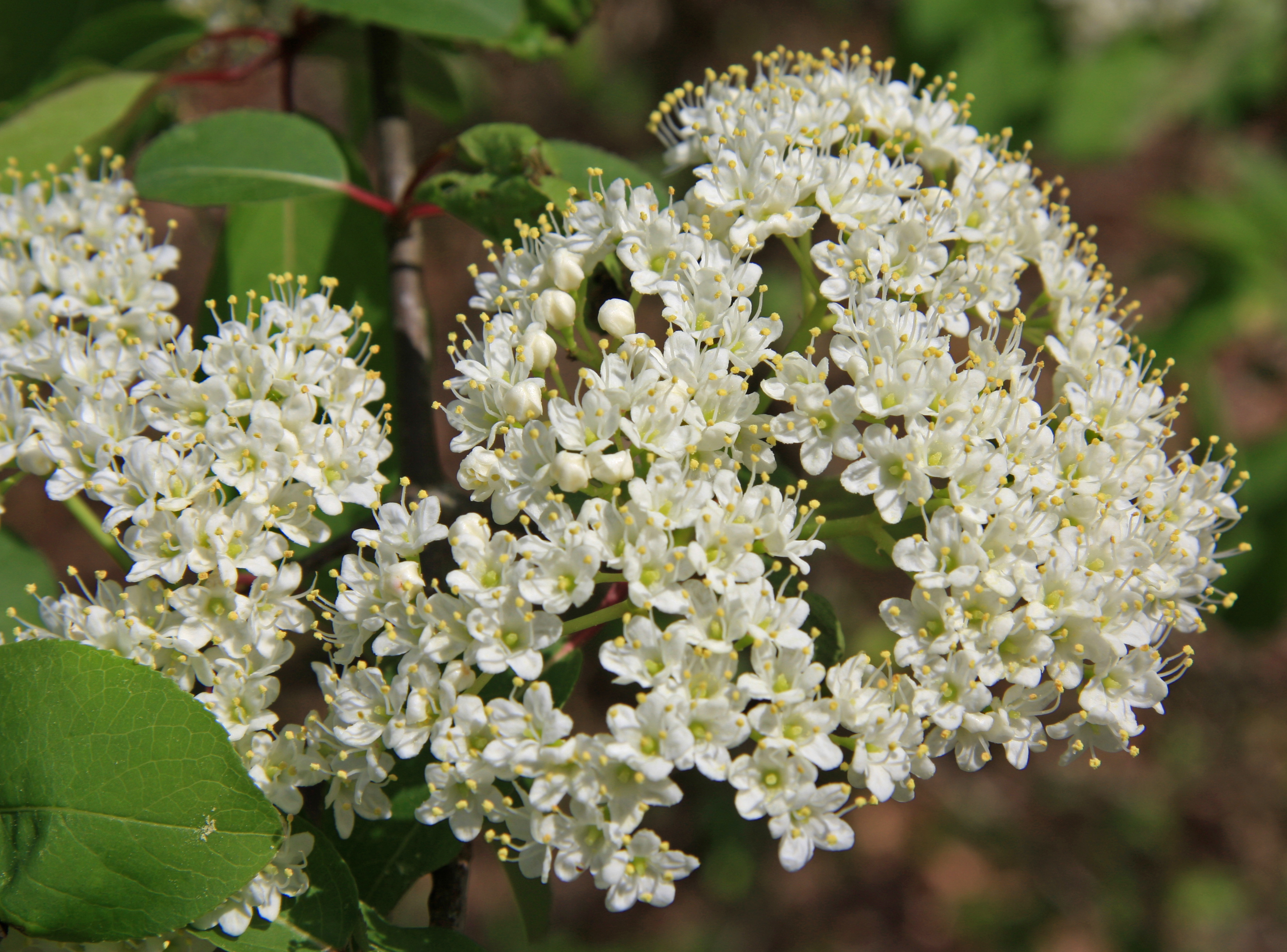
Flowers

The flowers of Viburnum cassinoides emerge from a dense cluster called a dichasial cyme composed of many trios of one terminal axis and two lateral axes, which may act as terminal axes themselves and develop their own lateral axes. Each axis is terminated by a bisexual flower adorned with 5 white petals, a single pistil and 5 stamens topped with yellow anthers. Additionally, the stamens are perfectly centered on the flower's sepals, which are partially fused at the base.

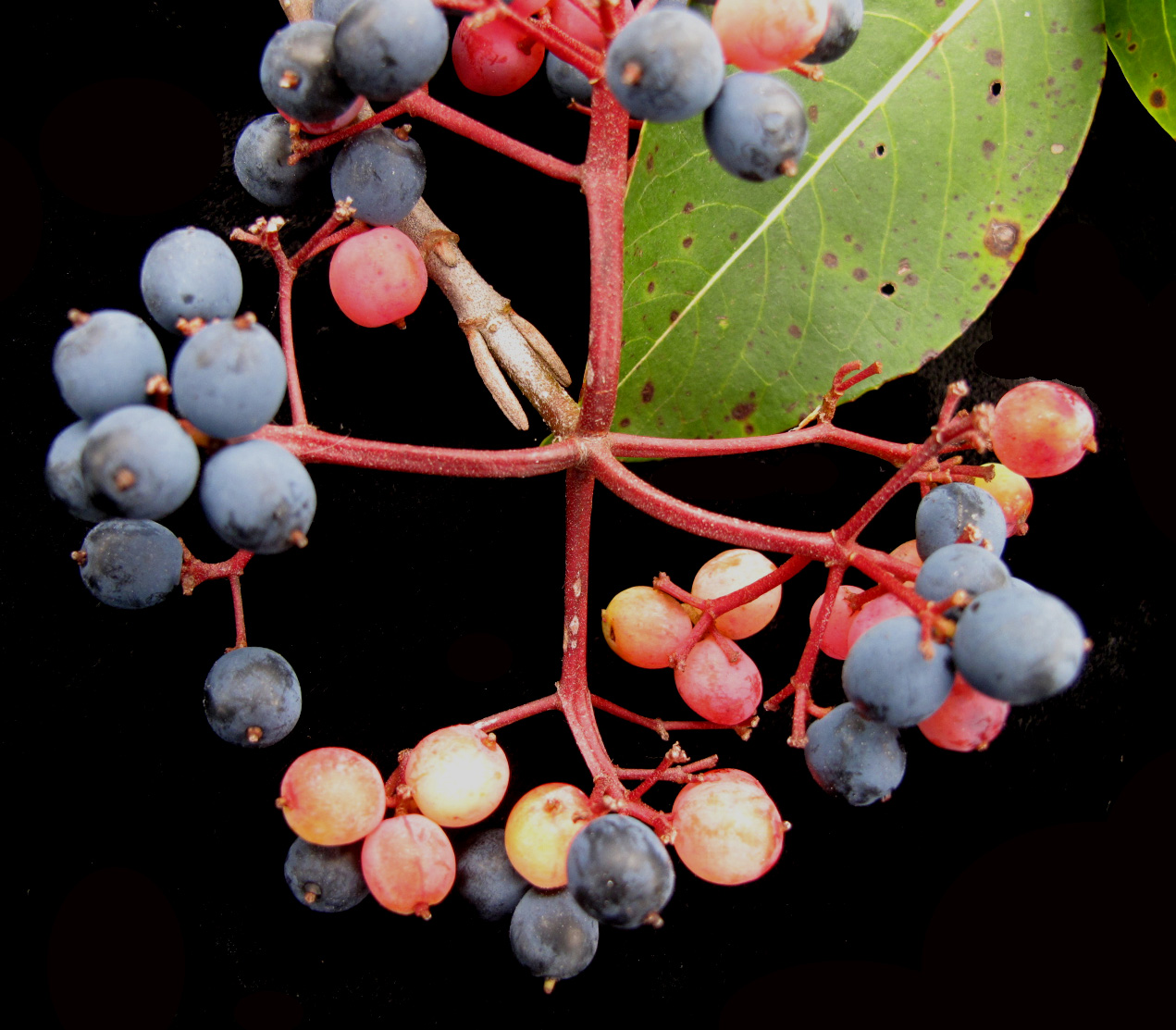
Fruits

Northern wild raisin's flowers develop into fleshy spherical fruits, which are botanically described as drupes and not berries. They gradually change colour from green, to pink, to dark blue, and at maturity their flesh is edible raw or cooked.

== Distribution ==
Viburnum cassinoides has been recorded under its synonym Viburnum nudum var. cassinoides in Connecticut, Massachusetts, Maine, New Hampshire, Rhode Island and Vermont. Through iNaturalist, this species has been observed in Ontario, Québec, New Brunswick, Nova Scotia, Prince Edward Island and Newfoundland and Labrador (only on Newfoundland Island), as well as northern Michigan, northeastern Ohio, New York State and along the Appalachians down to northeastern Alabama and northern Georgia.

=== Conservation status ===
Although the IUCN has not assessed this species' conservation status, NatureServe denotes it as Possibly Extirpated in Delaware and Critically Imperiled in Wisconsin and Indiana, where only sparse populations subsist. It is considered Secure across most of the rest of its range.

== Uses ==
As mentioned, Viburnum cassinoides bears edible fruits that may be consumed raw or cooked and incorporated into various dishes (chiefly desserts). Many native American tribes such as the Abenaki and Algonquins made use of them. While a single fruit contains little flesh, its stony pit accounting for most of its volume, said flesh is said to be "sweet and well-flavoured". The plant's leaves also make for a pleasant tea substitute, and for this they are "steamed over boiling water, rolled between the fingers, allowed to stand overnight and then dried in an oven to be used as required."
