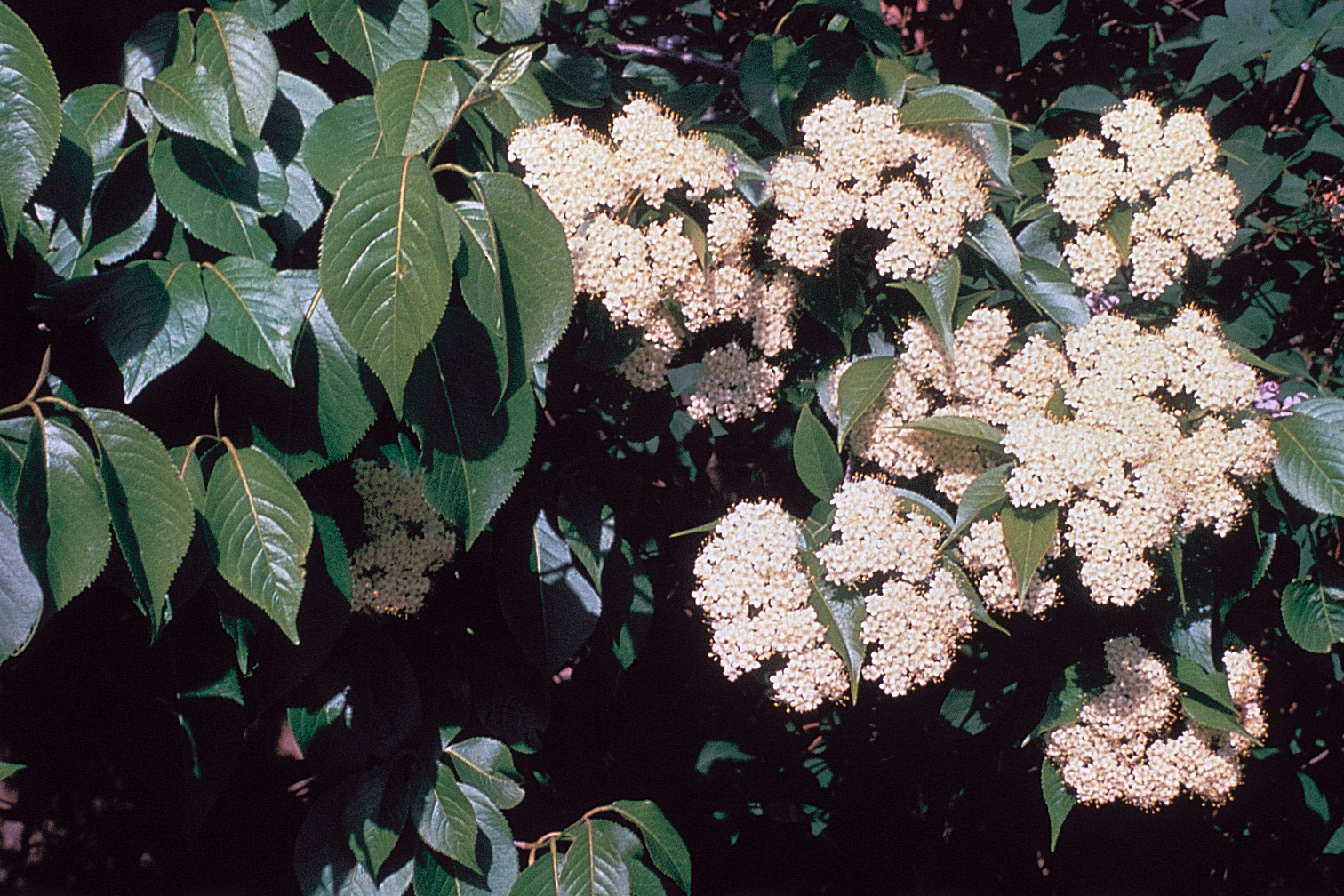

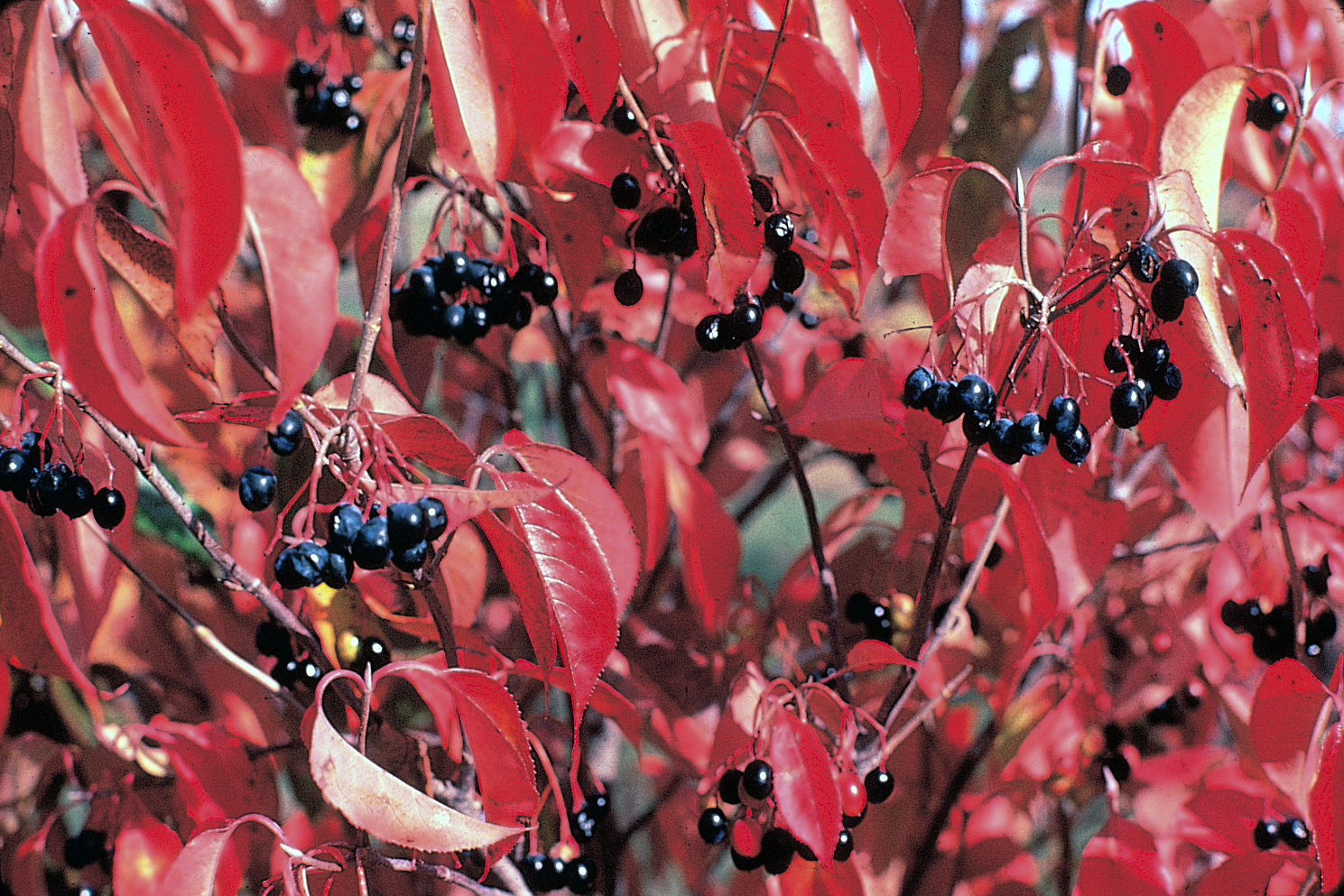

Scientific classification
- Kingdom: Plantae
- Clade: Tracheophytes
- Clade: Angiosperms
- Clade: Eudicots
- Clade: Asterids
- Order: Dipsacales
- Family: Adoxaceae
- Genus: Viburnum
- Species: V. lentago

Binomial name
- Viburnum lentago L.
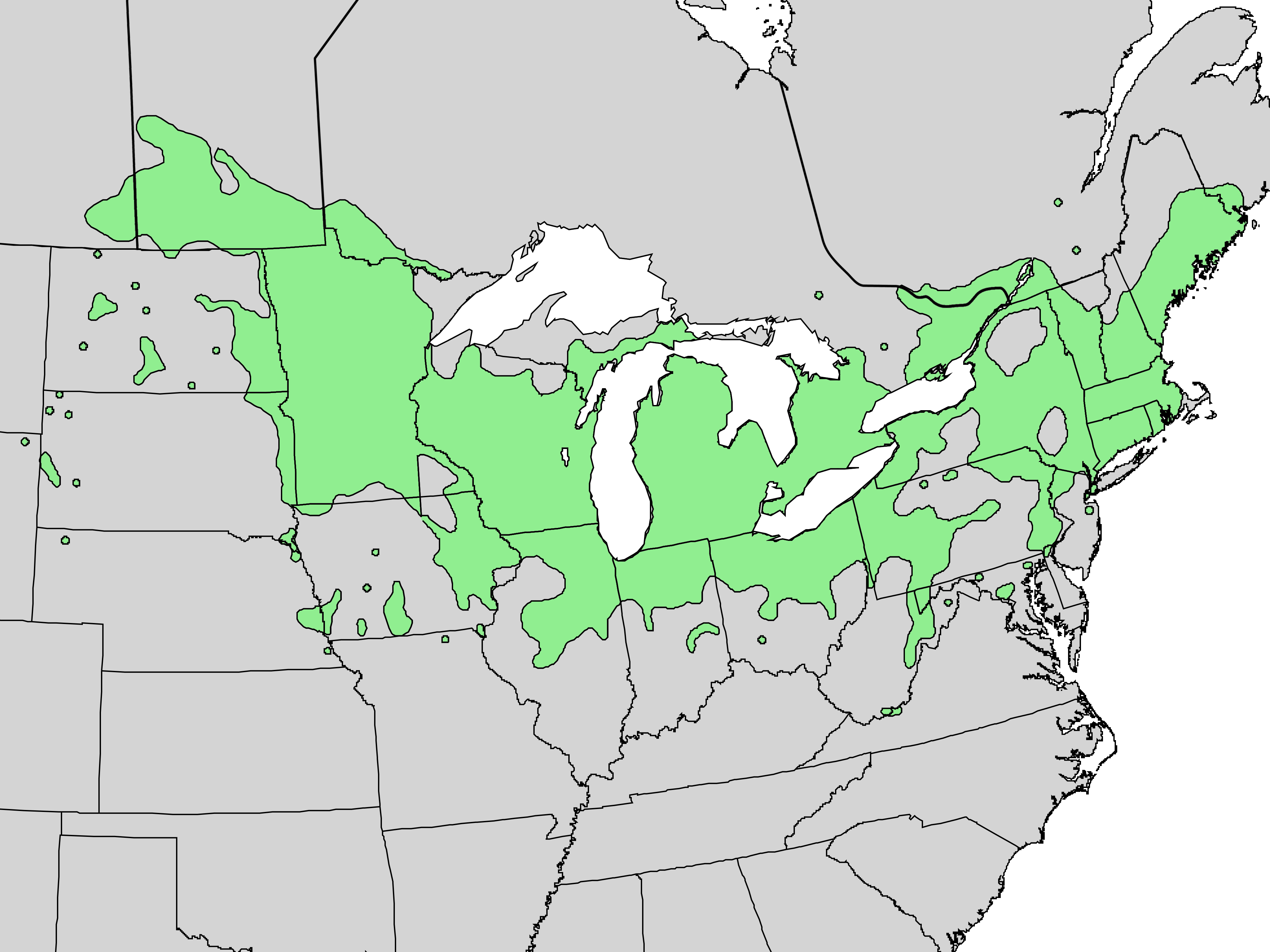
- Natural range of Viburnum lentago

= Viburnum lentago =

Species of flowering plant

Viburnum lentago, the nannyberry, sheepberry, or sweet viburnum, is a species of Viburnum native to North America.

== Description ==
It is a large shrub or small tree growing upwards to 9 m (30 ft) tall with a trunk up to 25 cm (10 in) in diameter and a short trunk, round-topped head, pendulous, flexible branches. The bark is reddish- to grayish-brown, and broken into small scales. The twigs are pale green and covered with rusty down at first, later becoming dark reddish brown, sometimes glaucous, smooth, tough, flexible, and produce an offensive odor when crushed or bruised. The winter buds are light red, covered with pale scurfy down, protected by a pair of opposing scales. Flower-bearing buds are 2 cm (3/4 in) long, obovate, long pointed; other terminal buds are acute, 8.5 to 12.7 mm (1/3 to 1/2 in) long, while lateral buds are much smaller. The bud scales enlarge with the growing shoot and often become leaf-like.

Like all viburnums, the leaves are arranged in opposite pairs on the twigs; they are oval, 5–10 cm (2–4 in) long and 2–5 cm (3/4–2 in) broad, wedge-shaped, rounded or subcordate at base, with an acuminate apex and a finely serrated margin, and a winged petiole. They open from the bud involute, bronze green and shining, hairy and downy; when full grown are bright green and shining above, pale green and marked with tiny black dots beneath. In autumn they turn a deep red, or red and orange.

The flowers are small, 5–6 mm (0.20–0.24 in) in diameter, with five whitish petals, arranged in large round terminal cymes 5–12 cm (2–4 3/4 in) in diameter; flowering is in late spring. The calyx is tubular, equally five-toothed, persistent; the corolla is equally five-lobed, imbricate in the bud, cream-white, one-quarter of an inch across; lobes acute, and slightly erose. There are five stamens, inserted on the base of the corolla, alternate with its lobes, exserted; filaments slender; anthers bright yellow, oblong, introrse, versatile, two-celled; cells opening longitudinally. The pistil has a one-celled inferior ovary, the style thick, short, light green, and the stigma broad; there is one ovule in each cell.

The fruit is a small round blue-black drupe, 8–16 mm (0.31–0.63 in) long on a reddish stem; it is thick-skinned, sweet, and rather juicy. The stone is oblong oval, flattened.

The roots are fibrous. The wood is ill-smelling, dark orange brown, heavy, hard, close-grained, with a specific gravity of 0.7303.

== Distribution and habitat ==
Nannyberry is native to the northeastern and midwestern United States, and to southern Canada from New Brunswick west to southeastern Saskatchewan. Isolated populations are found in the Dakotas, Wyoming, Colorado, and the Appalachian Mountains as far south as Kentucky and Virginia. It grows in wet soil along the borders of the forest, often found in fence corners and along roadsides.

== Ecology ==
Mammals, game birds and songbirds consume the fruit during the winter.

== Uses ==
As suggested by the alternative name sweet viburnum, the fruit is (unlike that of many viburnums) widely palatable. The bark and leaves were also used by Native Americans in the preparation of herbal medicines.

It is admired for its compact habit, its lustrous foliage which insects rarely disfigure, its beautiful and abundant flowers, its handsome edible fruit and its brilliant autumnal color. It readily adapts itself to cultivation, and is one of the best of the small trees of eastern America for the decoration of parks and gardens in all regions of extreme winter cold. It is easily raised from seeds which, like those of the other American species, do not germinate until the second year after they are planted.

It has been hybridized with Viburnum prunifolium in gardens to give the hybrid Viburnum × jackii.
