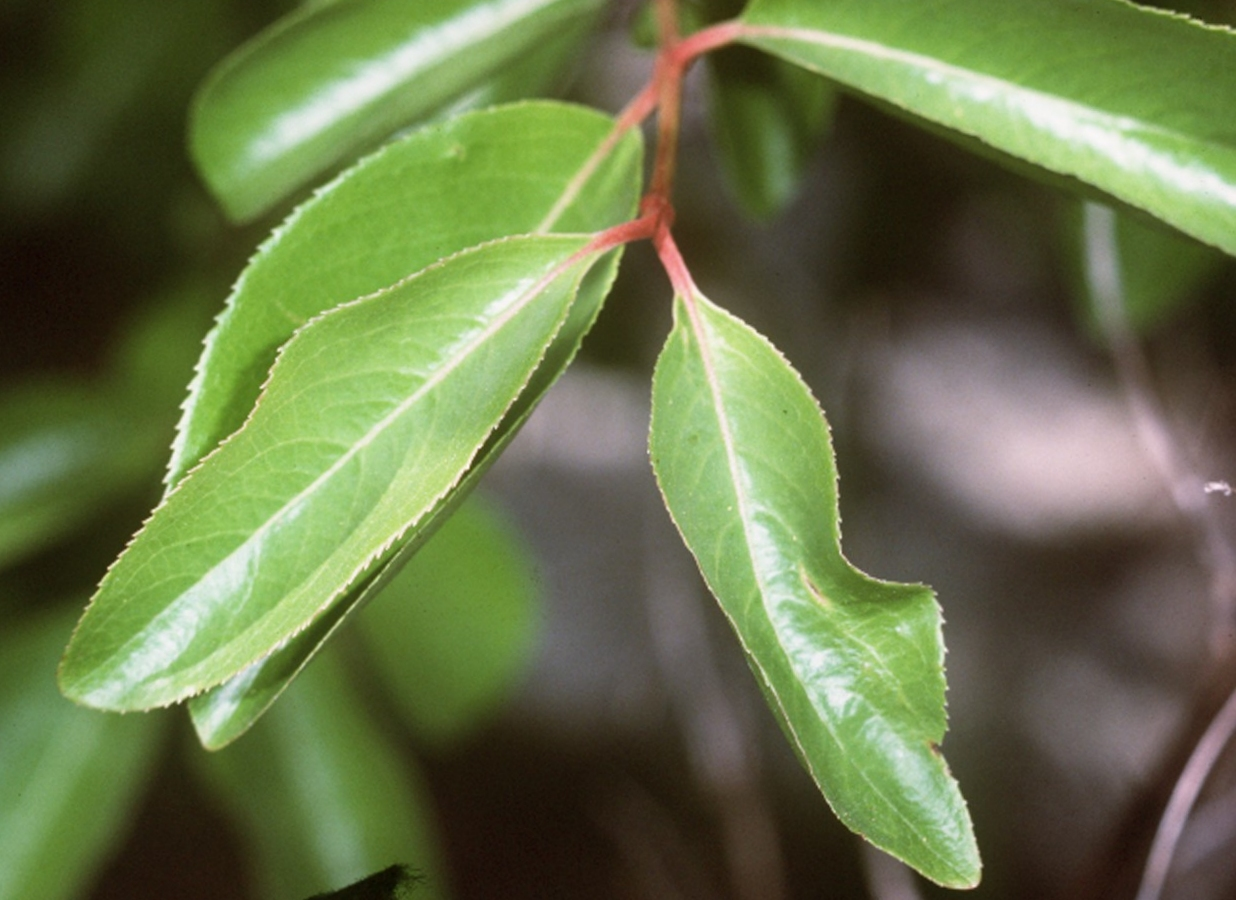
- Foliage

Conservation status
- Least Concern (IUCN 3.1)

Scientific classification
- Kingdom: Plantae
- Clade: Tracheophytes
- Clade: Angiosperms
- Clade: Eudicots
- Clade: Asterids
- Order: Dipsacales
- Family: Adoxaceae
- Genus: Viburnum
- Species: V. prunifolium

Binomial name
- Viburnum prunifolium L.
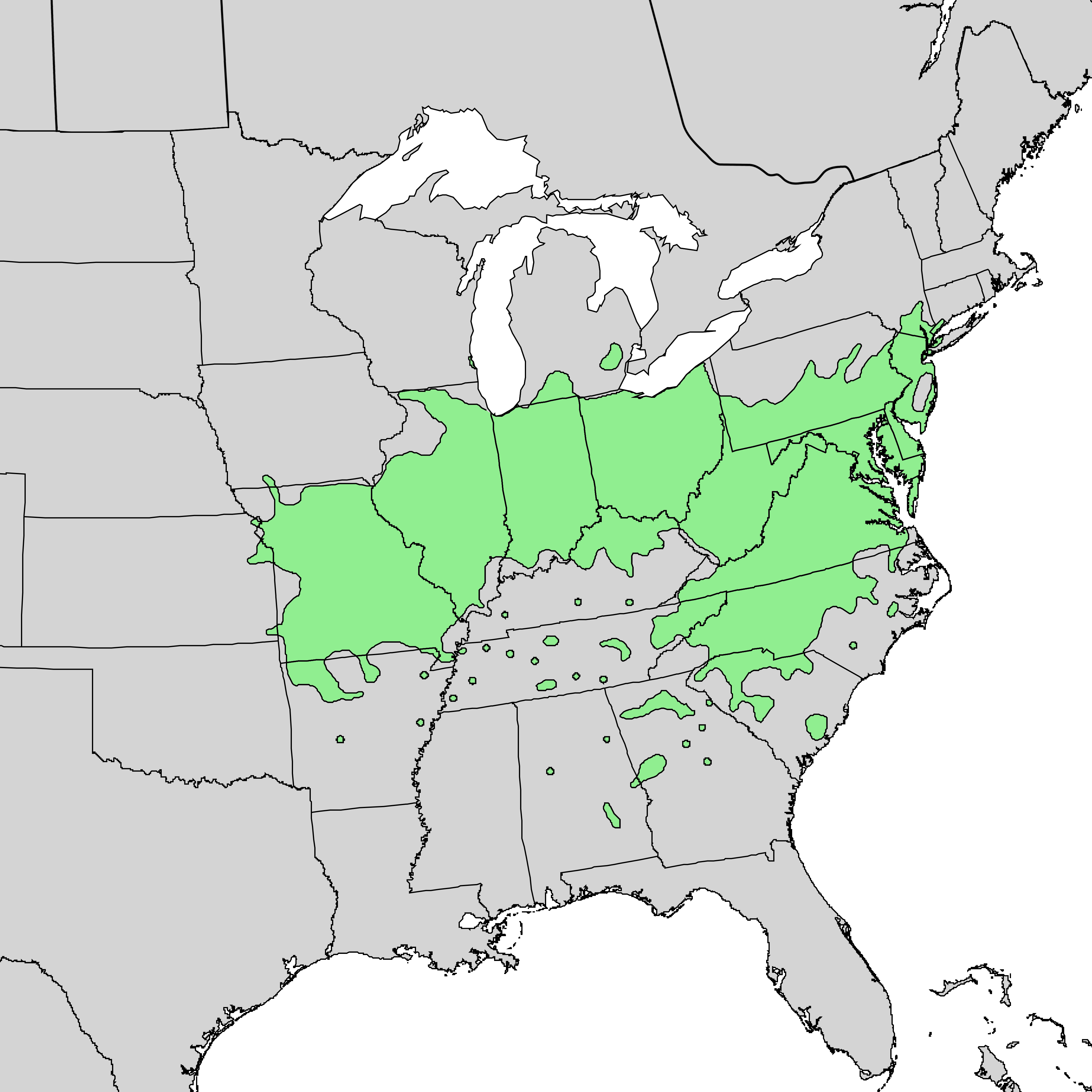
- Natural range

= Viburnum prunifolium =

Species of tree

Viburnum prunifolium (known as blackhaw or black haw, blackhaw viburnum, sweet haw, and stag bush) is a species of Viburnum native to eastern North America, from Connecticut west to eastern Kansas, and south to Alabama and Texas.

== Growth ==
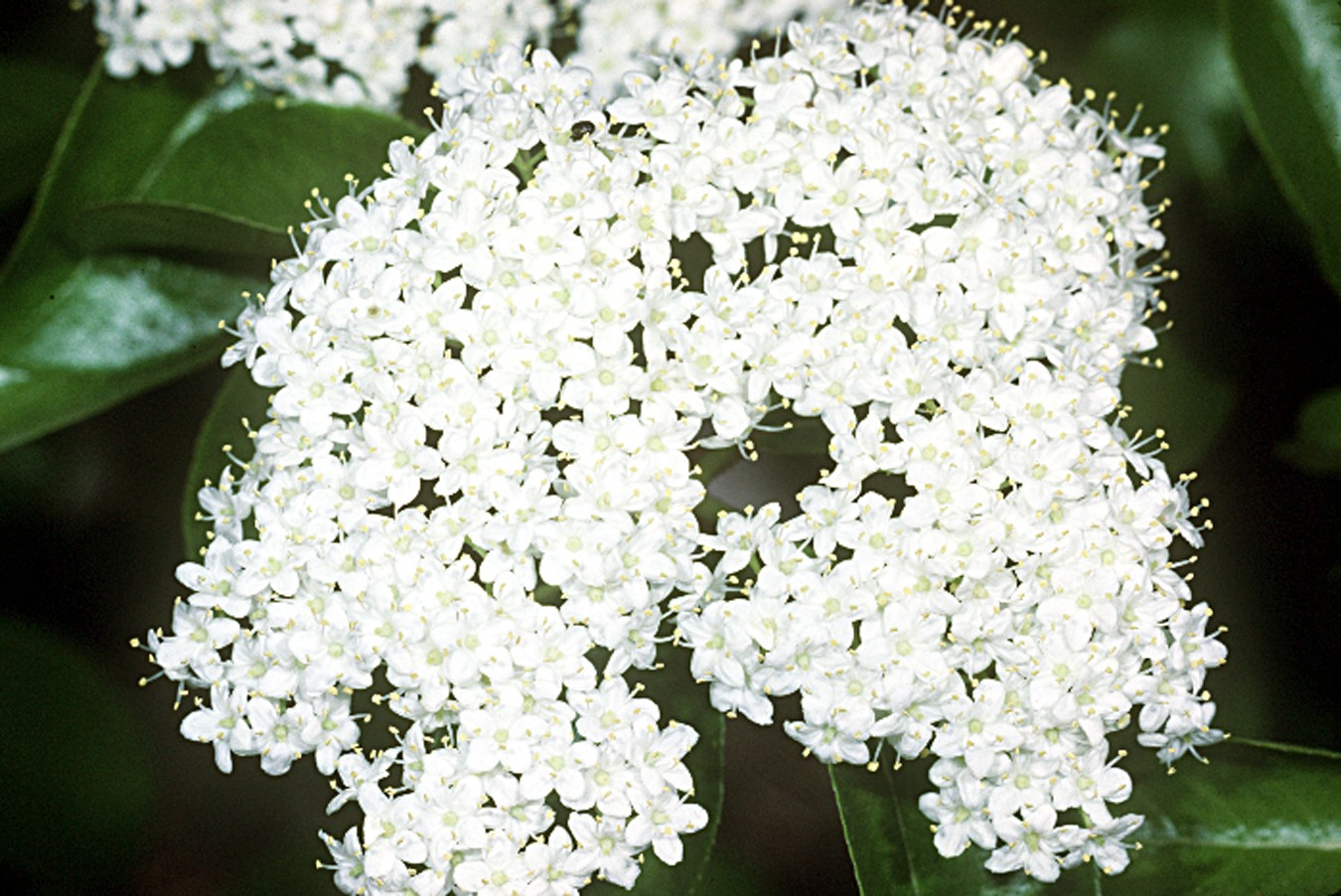
Flowers

It is a deciduous shrub or small tree growing to 2–9 metres (7–30 ft) tall with a short crooked trunk and stout spreading branches; in the northern parts of its range, it is a shrub, becoming a small tree in the southern parts of its range. The bark is reddish-brown, very rough on old stems. The branchlets are red at first, then green, finally dark brown tinged with red. The winter buds are coated with rusty tomentum. The flower buds ovate, 1 cm long, much larger than the axillary buds. The leaves are simple, arranged oppositely, up to 9 cm long and 6 cm broad, oval, ovate or orbicular, wedge-shaped or rounded at base, serrate, acute, with serrated edges with a grooved and slightly winged red petiole 1.5 cm long; they turn red in fall. The leaves are superficially similar to some species of Prunus (thus "prunifolium"); they come out of the bud involute, shining, green, tinged with red, sometimes smooth, or clothed with rusty tomentum; when full grown dark green and smooth above, pale, smooth or tomentose beneath.

== Characteristics ==
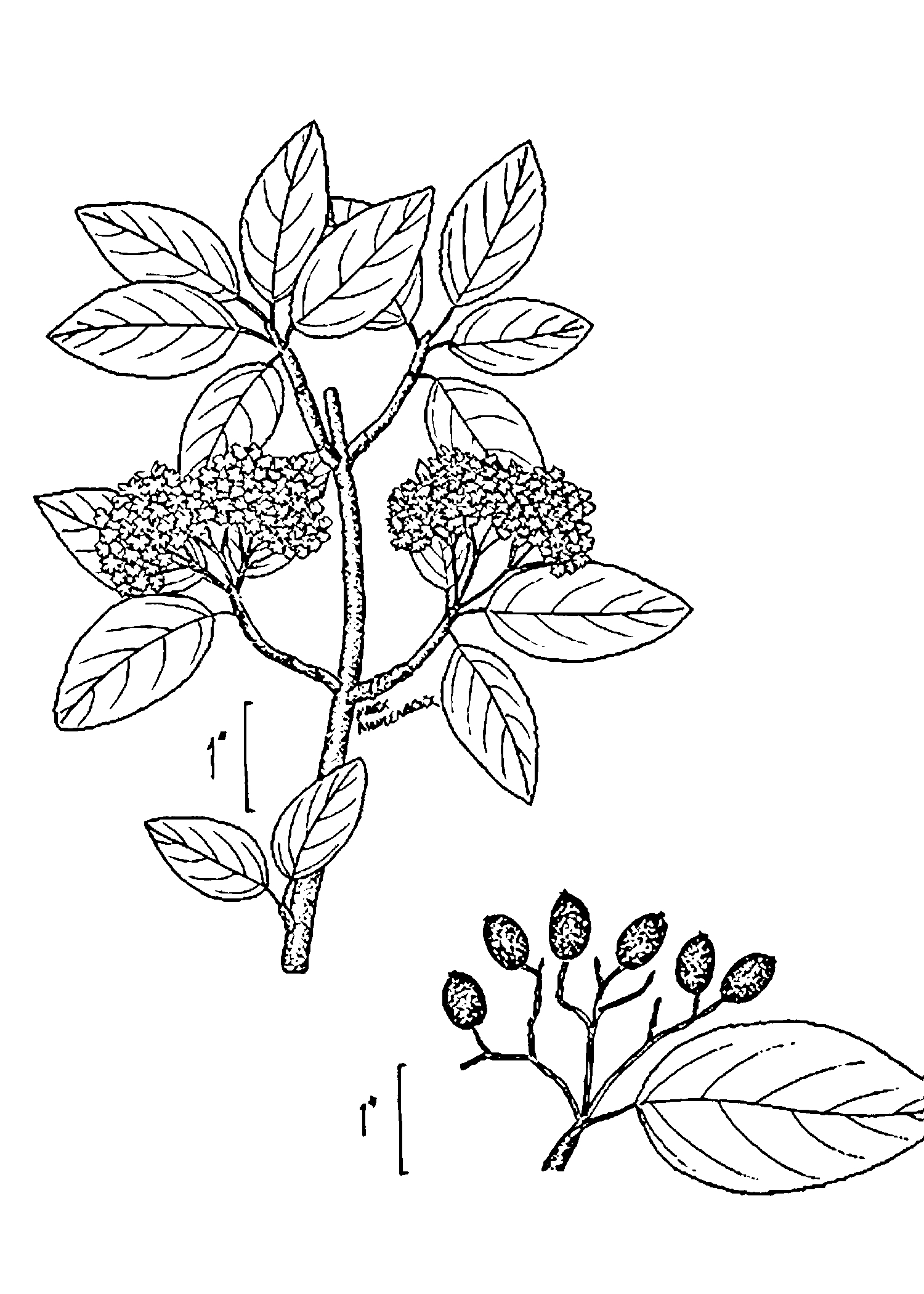
Botanical illustration

The flowers are creamy white, 9 mm diameter; the calyx is urn-shaped, five-toothed, persistent; the corolla is five-lobed, with rounded lobes, imbricate in bud; the five stamens alternate with the corolla lobes, the filaments slender, the anthers pale yellow, oblong, two-celled, the cells opening longitudinally; the ovary is inferior, one-celled, with a thick, pale green style and a flat stigma and a single ovule. The flowers are borne in flat-topped cymes 10 cm in diameter in mid to late spring. The fruit is a drupe 1 cm long, dark blue-black with glaucous bloom, hangs until winter, becomes edible after being frosted, then eaten by birds; the stone is flat and even, broadly oval. Wherever it lives, black haw prefers sunny woodland with well-drained soil and adequate water.

== Conservation status ==
It is threatened in Connecticut.

== Uses ==
It has both value in the pleasure garden, providing good fall color and early winter provender for birds, and medicinal properties.

It has hybridized with Viburnum lentago in cultivation to give the garden hybrid Viburnum × jackii.

The wood is brown tinged with red; heavy, hard, close-grained with a specific gravity of 0.8332.

=== Food ===
The Meskwaki eat the fruit raw and also cook them into a jam.

=== Medicinal ===
For centuries, black haw has been used for medical purposes, mainly for gynecological conditions. The bark is the part of the plant used in treatments.

The active components include scopoletin, aesculetin, salicin, 1-methyl-2,3 dibutyl hemimellitate, and viburnin. Tannin is another chemical component of black haw.

Native Americans used a decoction of black haw to treat gynecological conditions, including menstrual cramps, aiding recovery after childbirth, and in treating the effects of menopause. As a folk remedy, black haw has been used to treat menstrual pain, and morning sickness. Due to its antispasmodic properties, the plant may also be of use in treating cramps of the digestive tract or the bile ducts.

Black haw's primary use was to prevent miscarriages. The primary use of black haw today is to prevent menstrual cramps. The salicin in black haw may also be of use in pain relief.

==== By specific Native American tribes ====
The Cherokee have several uses for the plant. They take an infusion of it to prevent recurrent spasms, use the root bark as a diaphoretic and a tonic, and take a compound infusion of it for fever, smallpox and ague. They also use an infusion of the bark as a wash for a sore tongue. The Lenape combine the root bark with leaves of other plants and use it to strengthen female reproductive tract or use the root bark in a tonic alone. The Mi'kmaq take an infusion of the plant before and during parturition.

=== Safety issues ===
Like many other plants, including many food plants and those used as culinary herbs, black haw contains salicin, a chemical relative of aspirin. Those who are allergic to that substance should not use black haw. In addition, due to the connection between aspirin and Reye syndrome, young people or people afflicted with a viral disease should not use black haw.

The chemicals in black haw do relax the uterus and therefore probably prevent miscarriage; however, the salicin may be teratogenic. Consequently, pregnant women should not use black haw in the first two trimesters. Although it has been used traditionally to prevent miscarriage. Furthermore, anyone using herbs for medical reasons should only use them under the supervision of a qualified medical professional.

Black haw is not on the "generally recognized as safe list" of the U.S. Food and Drug Administration (FDA).
