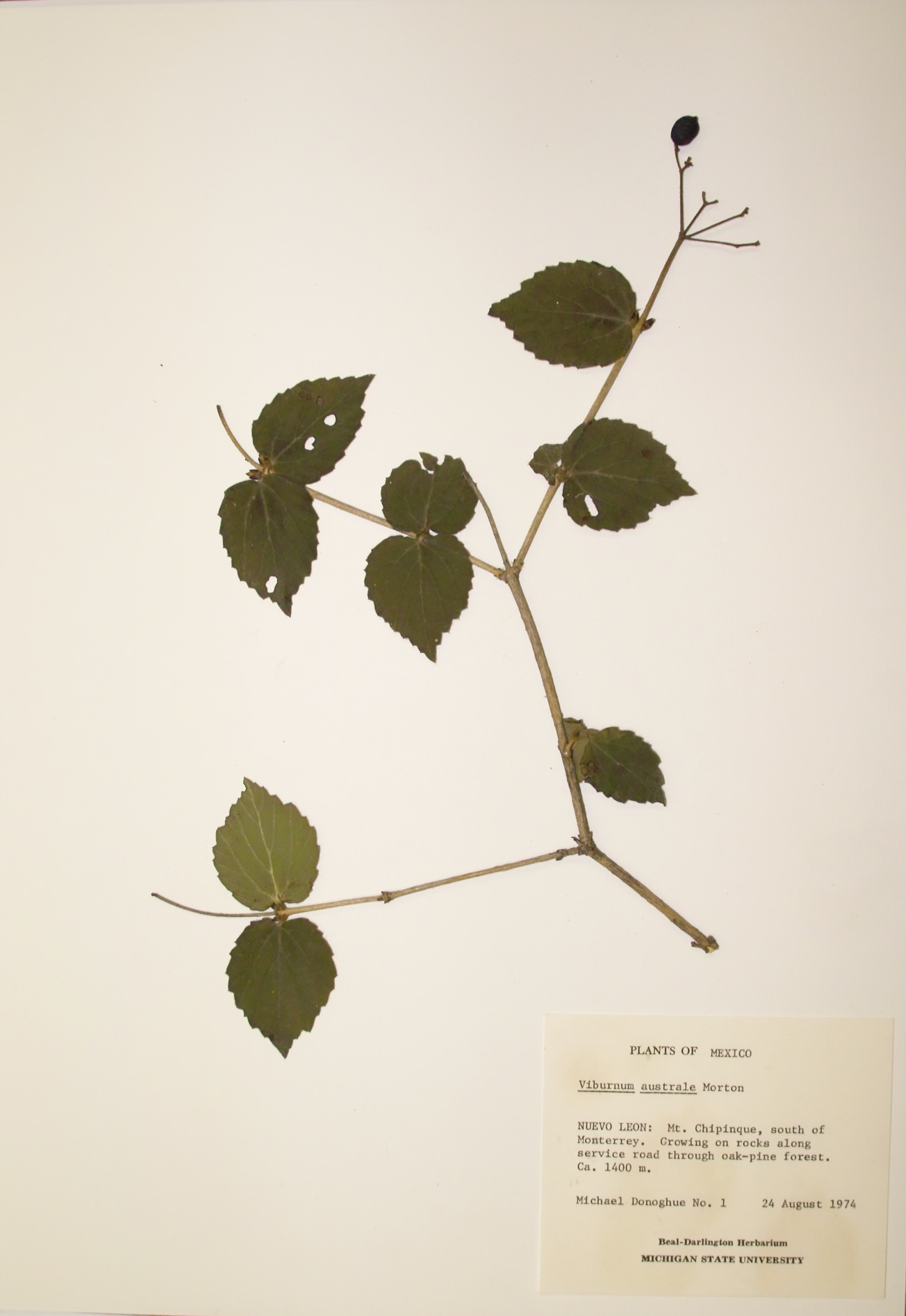

Scientific classification
- Kingdom: Plantae
- Clade: Tracheophytes
- Clade: Angiosperms
- Clade: Eudicots
- Clade: Asterids
- Order: Dipsacales
- Family: Adoxaceae
- Genus: Viburnum
- Species: V. australe

Binomial name
- Viburnum australe C.V.Morton

= Viburnum australe =

Species of flowering plant

Viburnum australe, known by the common name Mexican arrowwood, is a woody plant in the family Adoxaceae (previously Caprifoliaceae). It is found in northeastern Mexico and western Texas.

== Description ==
Viburnum australe grows as a deciduous, multi-stemmed shrub, reaching 1–3 meters (3.3–9.8 ft) in height.

Branches angled, dull, glabrous, pale; branchlets similar, sparsely glandular; leaves opposite, petiolate, the petiole up to 1 cm (0.39 in) long, glandular, hispidulous, stipulate, the stipules persistent, borne on the petiole about 1.5–2 mm (0.059–0.079 in) above its base, linear, up to 5 mm (0.20 in) long, glandular and hispidulous; blades broadly ovate to suborbicular, the larger 6 cm (2.4 in) long by 4.5 cm (1.8 in) wide, cordate or subcordate at base, abruptly short-acuminate at apex, conspicuously dentate (the teeth broad, extending to the middle of the blade or below), ciliate, above sparsely but uniformly strigose (the hairs all simple), glabrate with age, beneath glandular, hispidulous on the veins and veinlets, densely bearded in the vein axils; lateral veins 2 to 5, straight, reaching the margin; peduncle up to 3.5 cm (1.4 in) long, conspicuously glandular, bearing a few stellate hairs, these with numerous spreading branches; bracts at base of inflorescence conspicuous, up to 1.5 cm (0.59 in) long, 2 mm (0.079 in) broad at middle, narrowed at base, glandular and sparsely pubescent, the hairs both simple and stellate; cyme up to 5.7 cm (2.2 in) wide and 3 cm (1.2 in) long, twice compound, the primary rays 6 to 8, very densely glandular; bractlets of cyme linear, glandular, sparingly ciliate; calyx tube 2–2.5 mm (0.079–0.098 in) long, cylindric, densely glandular; calyx lobes about 1 mm (0.039 in) long, acute, ciliate with long simple hairs, glabrous on the back, eglandular; corolla 3.5–4 mm (0.14–0.16 in) long, glabrous; stamens slightly exserted, the filaments about 4 mm (0.16 in) long; style glabrous; fruit much flattened, about 1 cm (0.39 in) long, 8 mm (0.31 in) wide, and 3 mm (0.12 in) thick, fleshy, the endocarp 3-sulcate on one face (the central groove very slight, the lateral pronounced) and lightly 2-sulcate on the other, with no ventral intrusion.

== Distribution and habitat ==
Viburnum australe is native to the Sierra Madre Oriental in the Mexican states of Coahuila and Nuevo Léon. It also occurs in the United States in the Davis Mountains of Texas. V. australe inhabits mesic pine-oak forests above 1,000 meters (3,300 feet).

== Taxonomy and evolution ==
The generic name originated in Latin, where it referred to V. lantana. The specific epithet australe is derived from Latin australis, meaning "southern" (cf. Australia).

Viburnum australe was described as a separate species by Conrad Vernon Morton in 1933, from a specimen collected in 1906 by Cyrus Guernsey Pringle. Subsequent taxonomists subsumed V. australe into Viburnum affine C.K.Schneid., which is itself considered a midwestern variety of Viburnum rafinesqueanum Schult. However, recent molecular phylogenetic work has revealed that V. australe is actually more closely related to V. ellipticum, from the Pacific Coast Ranges of the western United States, than it is to V. rafinesqueanum. V. australe would therefore be considered a distinct species under the phylogenetic species concept.

Viburnum australe and V. ellipticum are closely related to three species from eastern North America: V. rafinesqueanum, V. molle, and the endangered V. bracteatum. These species, known as clade Mollodontotinus, are in turn more distantly related to the arrowwood species complex and its Neotropical relatives in clade Oreinodontotinus.

== Conservation ==
Viburnum australe is considered to be a rare species in the United States, where it is known from a single locality near the town of Madera Springs, Texas.

Like other species in clades Mollodontotinus and Oreinodontotinus, Viburnum australe is vulnerable to Pyrrhalta viburni, an invasive Eurasian leaf beetle. North American Viburnum, which did not coevolve with P. viburni, lack the physiological defenses that allow its Eurasian relatives to fend off beetle infestations, and have therefore been decimated in areas where P. viburni has become established.
