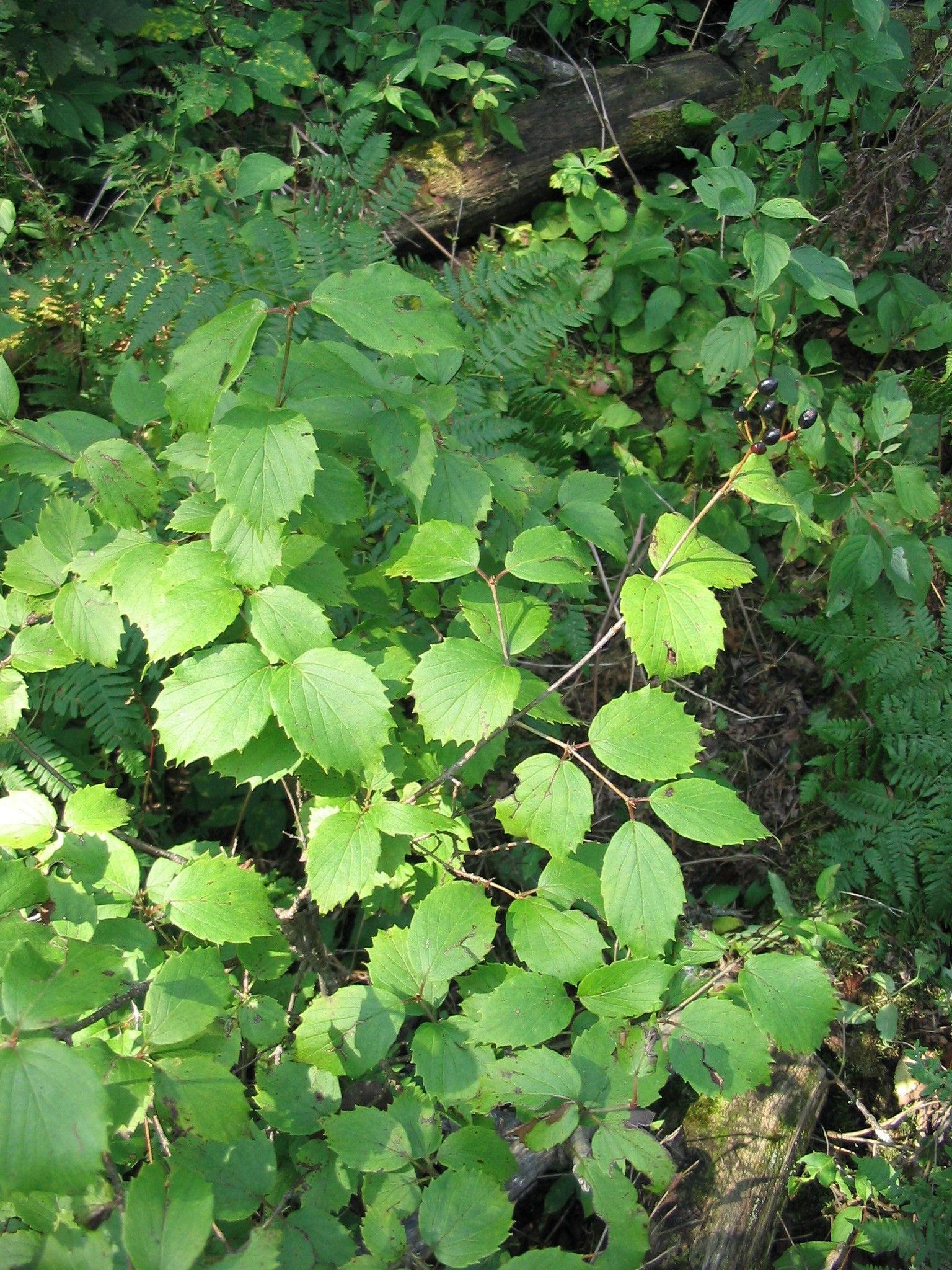

Scientific classification
- Kingdom: Plantae
- Clade: Embryophytes
- Clade: Tracheophytes
- Clade: Spermatophytes
- Clade: Angiosperms
- Clade: Eudicots
- Clade: Asterids
- Order: Dipsacales
- Family: Adoxaceae
- Genus: Viburnum
- Species: V. rafinesqueanum

Binomial name
- Viburnum rafinesqueanum Schult.

= Viburnum rafinesqueanum =

Species of shrub

Viburnum rafinesqueanum, the downy arrowwood, is a deciduous medium-sized (typically about 2 meters tall) shrub native to the Eastern United States and Canada from Quebec and Manitoba south to Georgia and west to Oklahoma. Downy arrow-wood produces ornamental but slightly malodorous flowers in Spring.

Viburnum rafinesqueanum has opposite, simple leaves and dark blue fruit in berry-like drupes. Foliage turns orange-red in late fall. Southern arrow-wood (V. dentatum) is similar, except that it blooms later and has broader, more coarsely toothed leaves and longer petioles.

Other similar species are smooth arrowwood (V. recognitum) and Carolina arrowwood (V. carolinianum).
