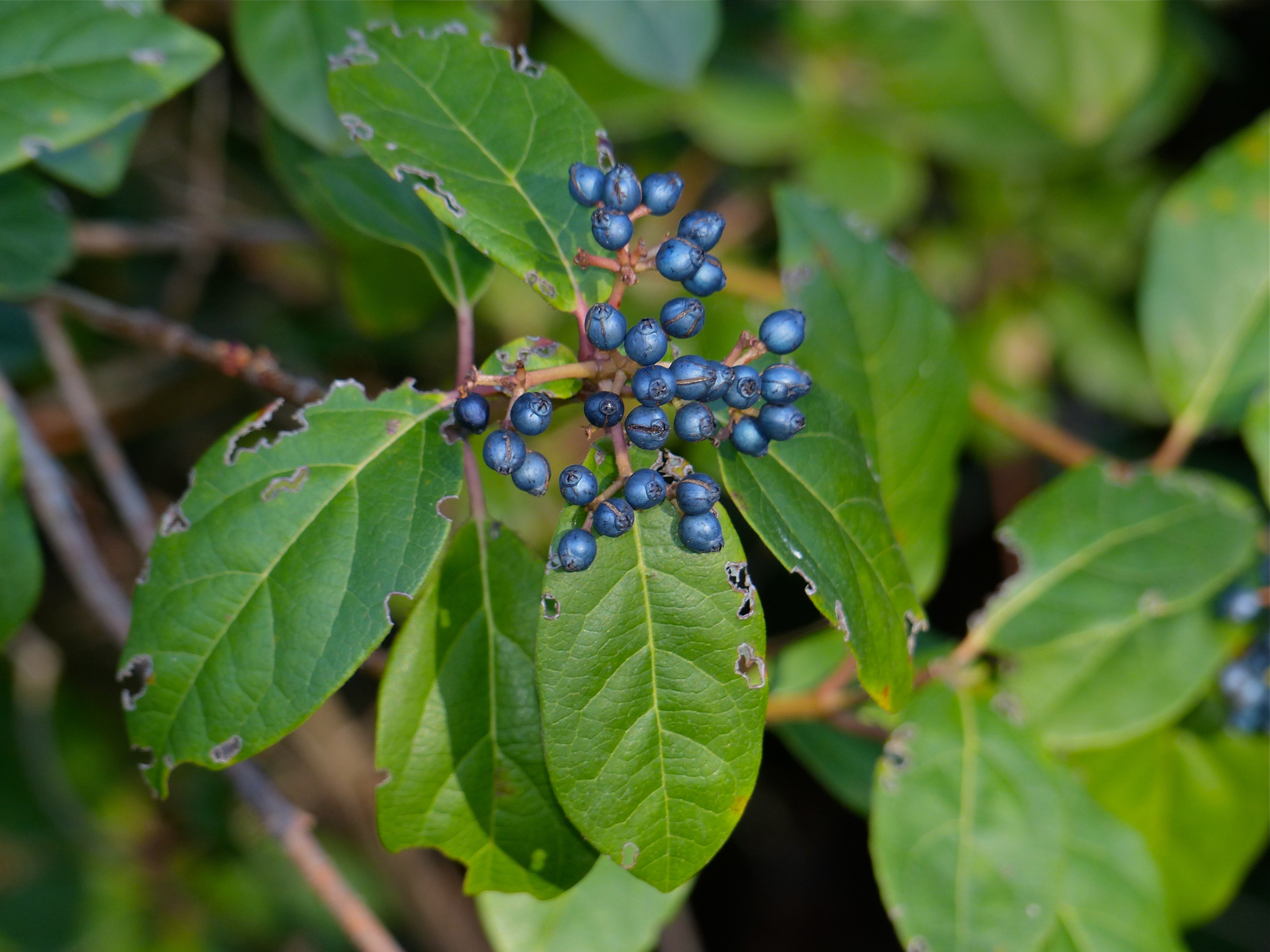
- In Hérault, southern France

Conservation status
- Least Concern (IUCN 3.1)

Scientific classification
- Kingdom: Plantae
- Clade: Embryophytes
- Clade: Tracheophytes
- Clade: Spermatophytes
- Clade: Angiosperms
- Clade: Eudicots
- Clade: Asterids
- Order: Dipsacales
- Family: Viburnaceae
- Genus: Viburnum
- Species: V. tinus

Binomial name
- Viburnum tinus L.

Synonyms
- Viburnum rigidum Vent.; Viburnum rugosum Pers.; Viburnum strictum Link; Tinus lucidus J.Presl; Tinus lauriformis J.Presl; Tinus laurifolius Borkh. in Roem.; Viburnum lauriforme Lam.; Viburnum hyemale Salisb.

= Viburnum tinus =

Species of flowering plant

Viburnum tinus, the laurustinus or laurustine, is a species of flowering plant in the family Viburnaceae, native to the Mediterranean area of Europe and North Africa.

== Description ==
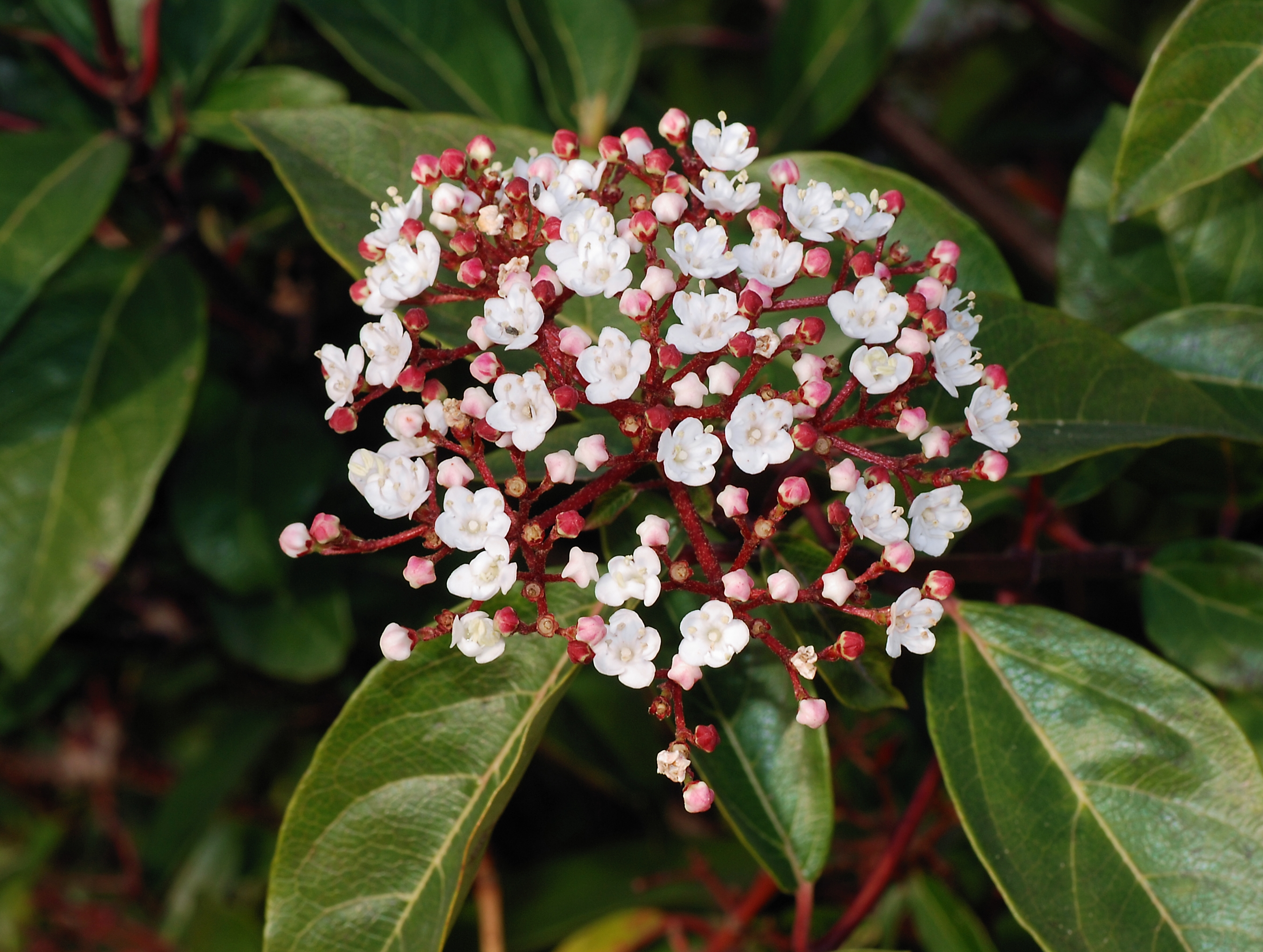
Flower and leaves

It is a shrub (rarely a small tree) reaching 2–7 m (7–23 ft) tall and 3 m (10 ft) broad, with a dense, rounded crown. The leaves are evergreen, persisting 2–3 years, ovate to elliptic, borne in opposite pairs, 4–10 cm long and 2–4 cm broad, fine hairs persisting on the underside, with an entire margin.

The flowers are small, white or light pink, produced from reddish-pink buds in dense cymes 5–10 cm diameter in the winter. The fragrant flowers (some consider the fragrance offensive, especially after rain when it is very strong) are bisexual (monoecious — having both male and female parts on one plant) and pentamerous. The flowering period is in winter, or from October to June in the northern hemisphere. The five petals are tubular, with rounded, corolla lobes, pink in the bud but later white. There is only one whorl with five stamens. Pollination is by insects. The fruit is a dark blue-black drupe 5–7 mm long. A 2020 study of the metallic blue hue of the fruit revealed microscopic globules of fat to be the cause, an example of structural colour, which is unusual in plants.

The leaves have domatia where predatory and microbivorous mites can be housed.

== Distribution and habitat ==
Native to the Mediterranean region, Viburnum tinus prefers shady, moist areas. It is most commonly found in the western Mediterranean due to a shorter drought season and is one of the dominant species of Mediterranean sclerophyllous shrubland. It was introduced to Britain by 1596, and is now widely naturalised in southern England, and more locally in northern England, Wales, and Scotland; it is also locally naturalised in southeastern Ireland. It has also been introduced to Australia, New Zealand, Pakistan, the United States (California, Oregon) and Tajikistan.

== Cultivation ==
Viburnum tinus is widely cultivated for its winter flowers and metallic blue berries. It is hardy down to −10 °C (14 °F). The cultivars 'Eve Price', 'French White' and 'Gwenllian' have gained the Royal Horticultural Society's Award of Garden Merit.

=== Other uses ===
'The active ingredients are viburnin (a substance or more probably a mixture of compounds) and tannins. Tannins can cause stomach upset. The leaves when infused are said to have antipyretic properties. The fruits have been used as purgatives against constipation. The tincture has been used lately in herbal medicine as a remedy for depression. The plant also contains iridoid glucosides.

== Pests ==
In south-east Britain, Viburnum tinus is the principal host of the viburnum beetle (Pyrrhalta viburni), the country's "number one pest species" according to the Royal Horticultural Society.

== Etymology ==
The generic name of the plant derives from Latin viburnum, referring to Viburnum lantana. The specific name derives from Latin tinus referring to the plant itself, Viburnum tinus. Laurus in 'laurustinus' signifies the leaves' similarities to bay laurel.

== Gallery ==
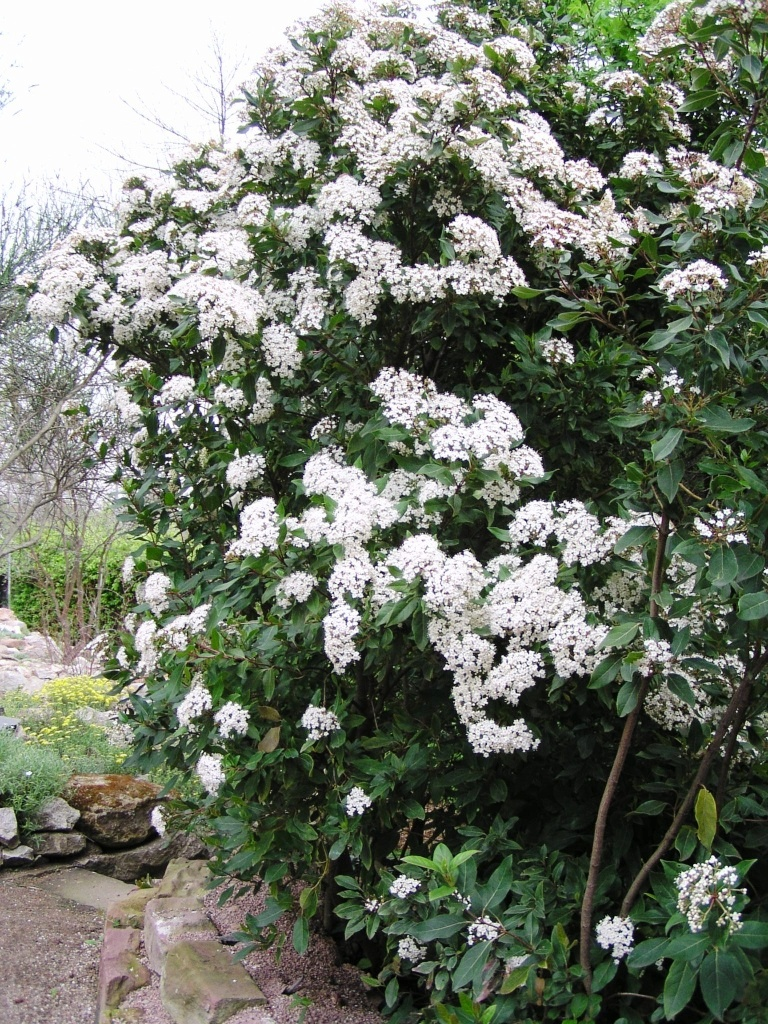
Plant

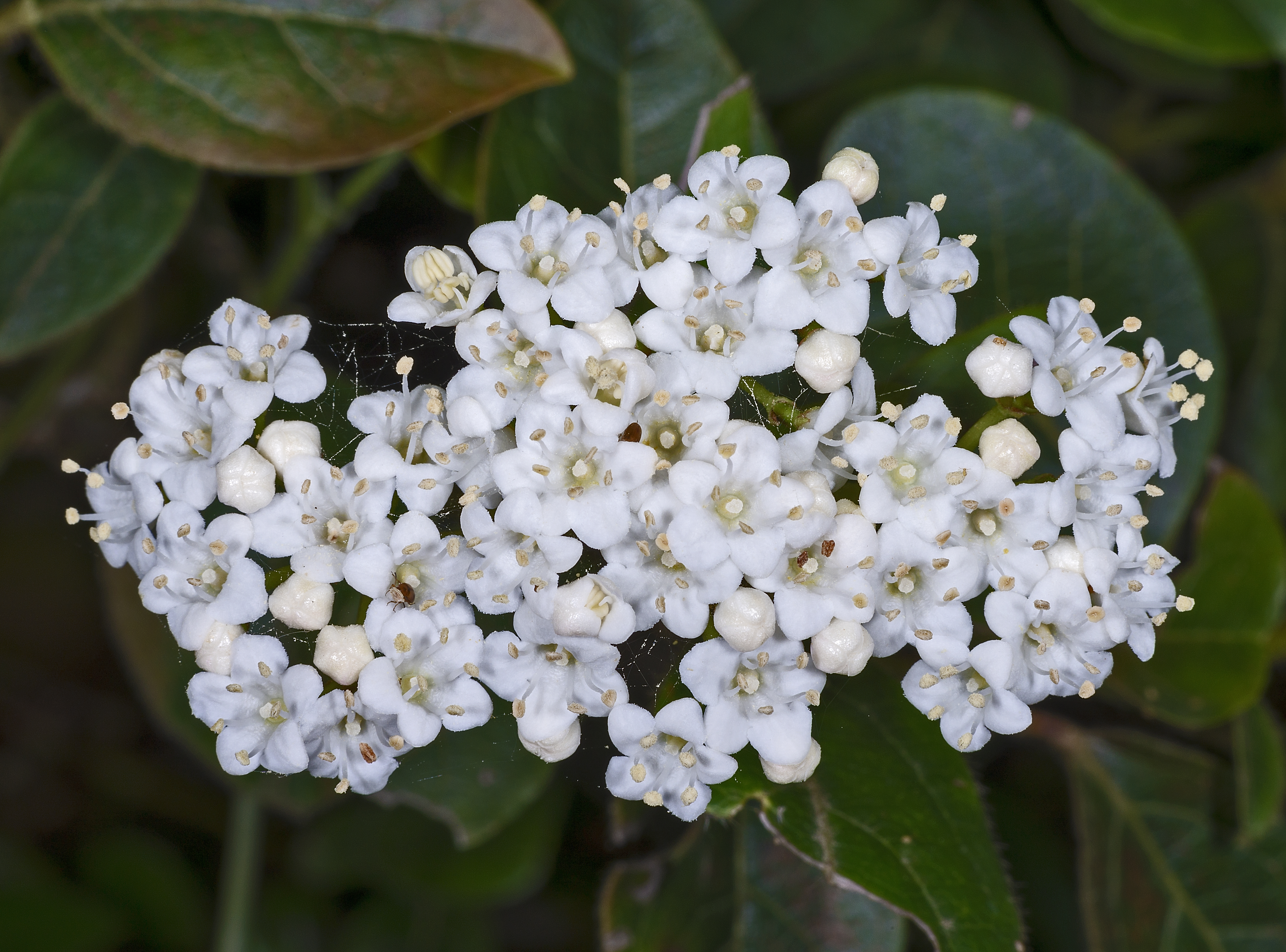
Inflorescence

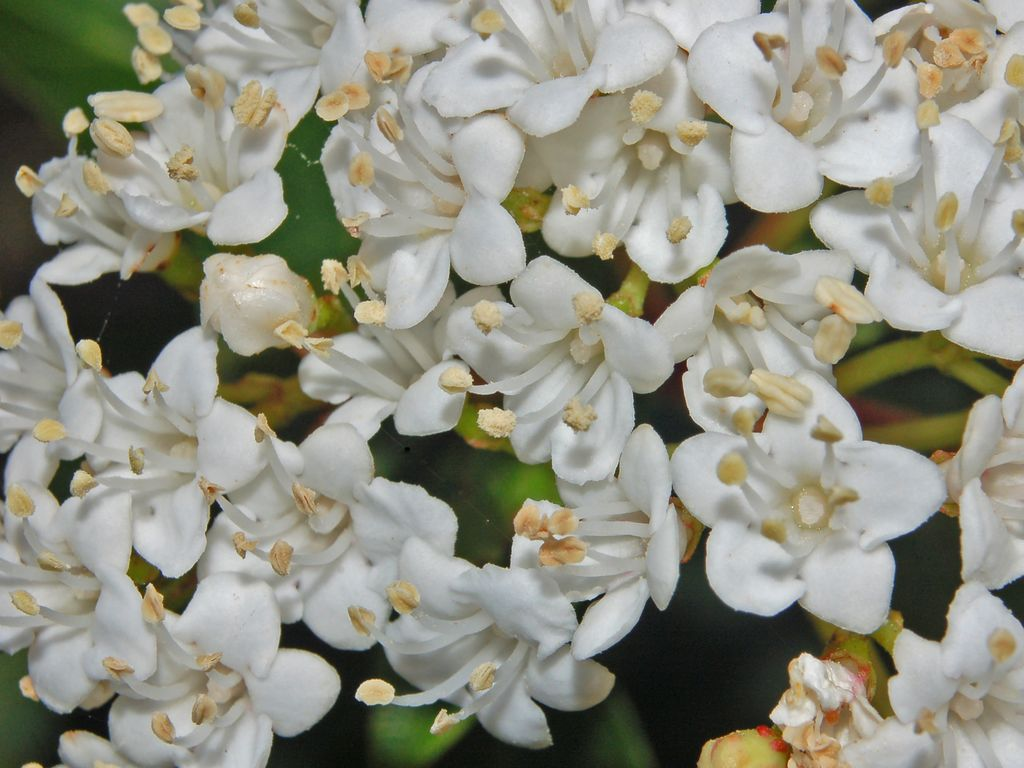
Close-up on flowers

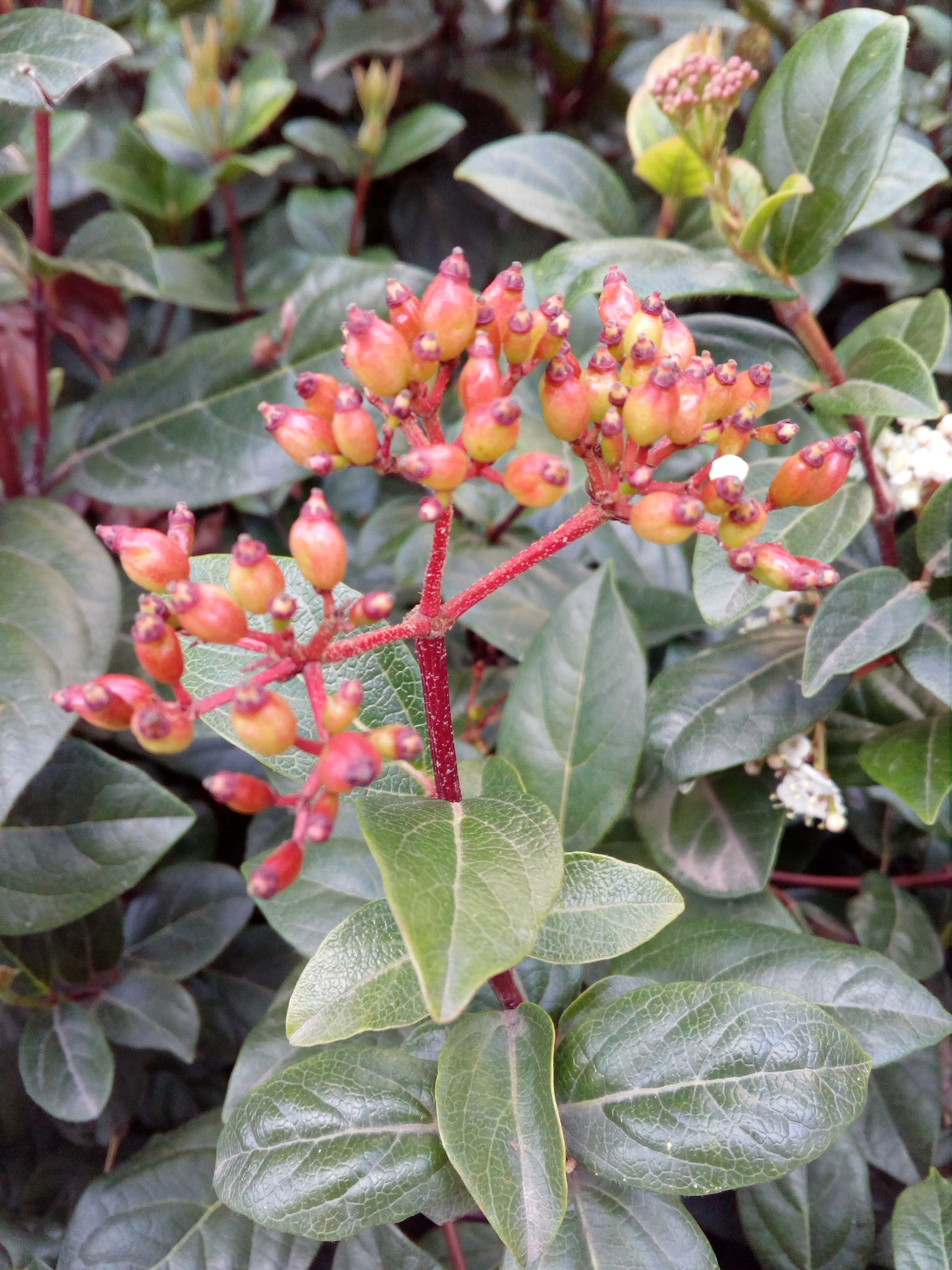
Unripe fruit

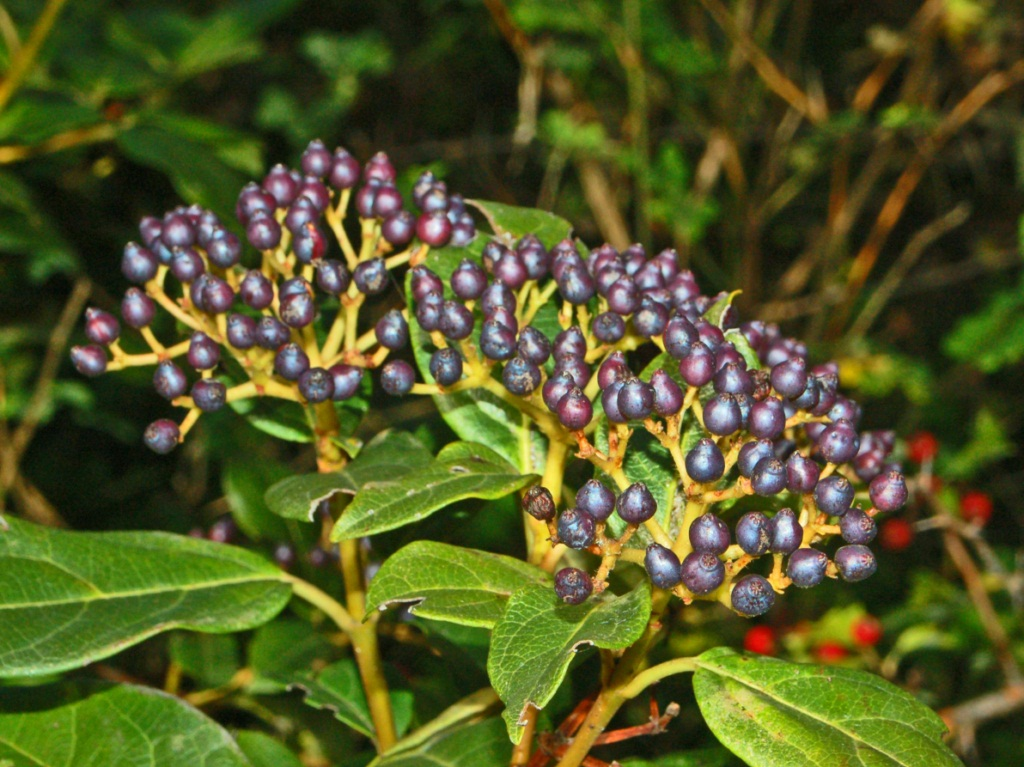
Ripe fruit

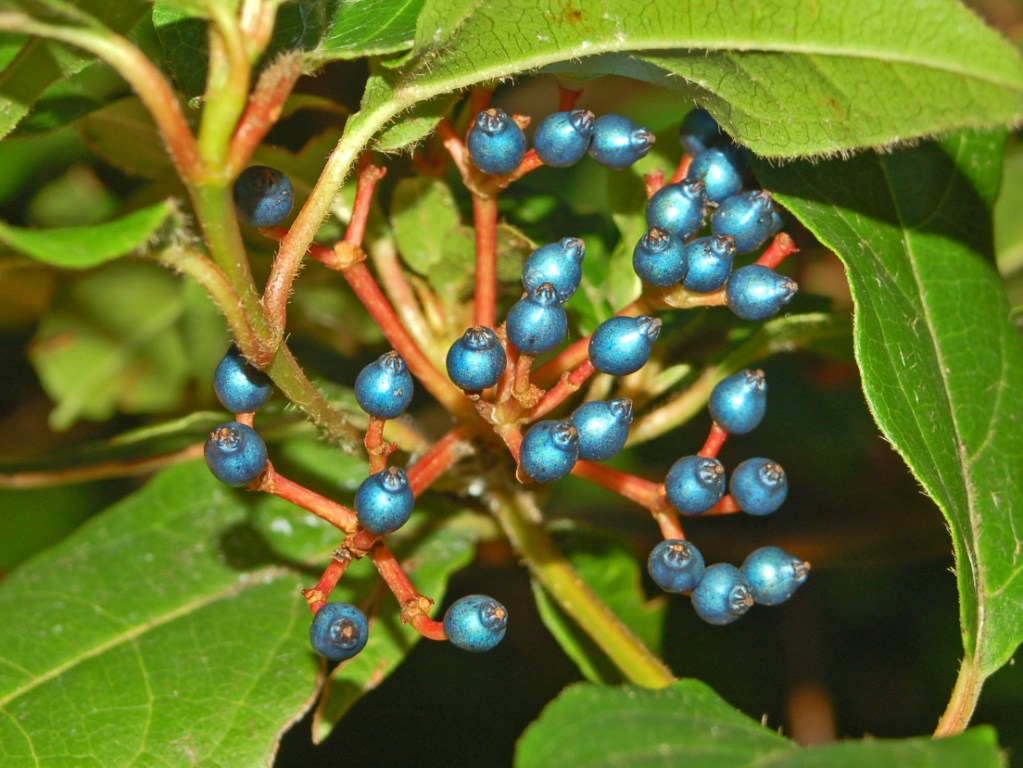
Close-up of fruit

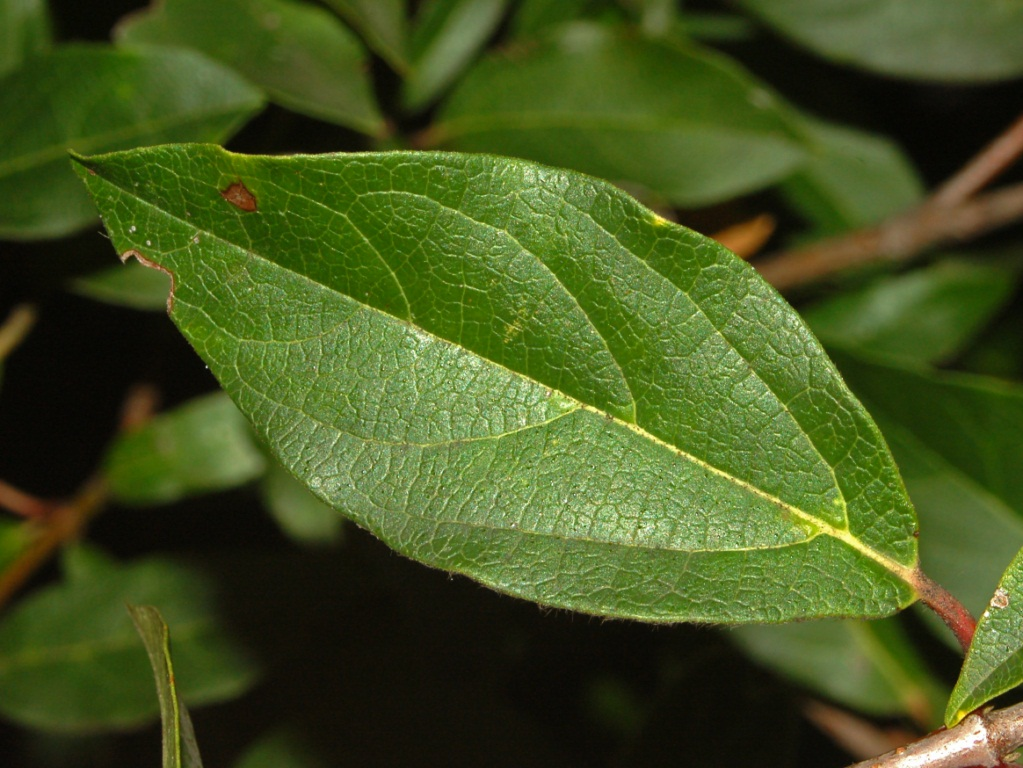
Leaf
