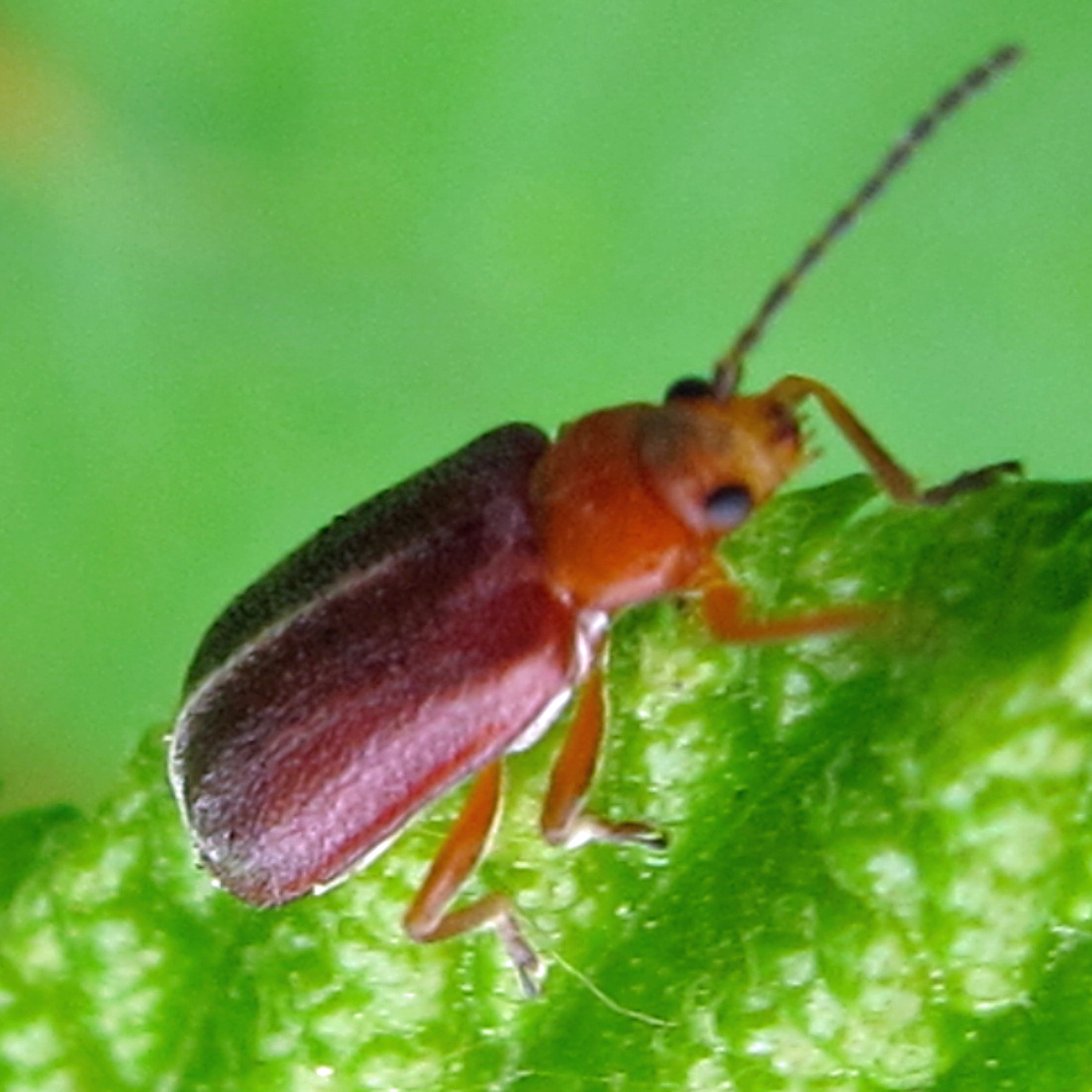
- Tricholochmaea cavicollis

Scientific classification
- Kingdom: Animalia
- Phylum: Arthropoda
- Clade: Pancrustacea
- Class: Insecta
- Order: Coleoptera
- Suborder: Polyphaga
- Infraorder: Cucujiformia
- Family: Chrysomelidae
- Subfamily: Galerucinae
- Tribe: Galerucini
- Genus: Tricholochmaea; Laboissière, 1932

= Tricholochmaea =

Genus of beetles

Tricholochmaea is a genus of skeletonizing leaf beetles and flea beetles in the family Chrysomelidae. There are 21 described species and two subspecies of Tricholochmaea. It is treated as a synonym of Pyrrhalta by some authors, but not by others.

== Species ==
- Tricholochmaea alni (Fall, 1924)
- Tricholochmaea cavicollis (J. L. LeConte, 1865) (cherry leaf beetle)
- Tricholochmaea decora (Say, 1824) (Pacific willow leaf beetle)
- Tricholochmaea kalmiae (Fall, 1924)
- Tricholochmaea perplexa (Fall, 1924)
- Tricholochmaea punctipennis (Mannerheim, 1843)
- Tricholochmaea ribicola (Brown, 1938)
- Tricholochmaea rufosanguinea (Say, 1826)
- Tricholochmaea sablensis (Brown, 1969)
- Tricholochmaea spiraeae (Fall, 1924)
- Tricholochmaea spiraeophila (Hatch in Hatch and Beller, 1932)
- Tricholochmaea tuberculata (Say, 1824)
- Tricholochmaea vaccinii (Fall, 1924) (blueberry leaf beetle)
