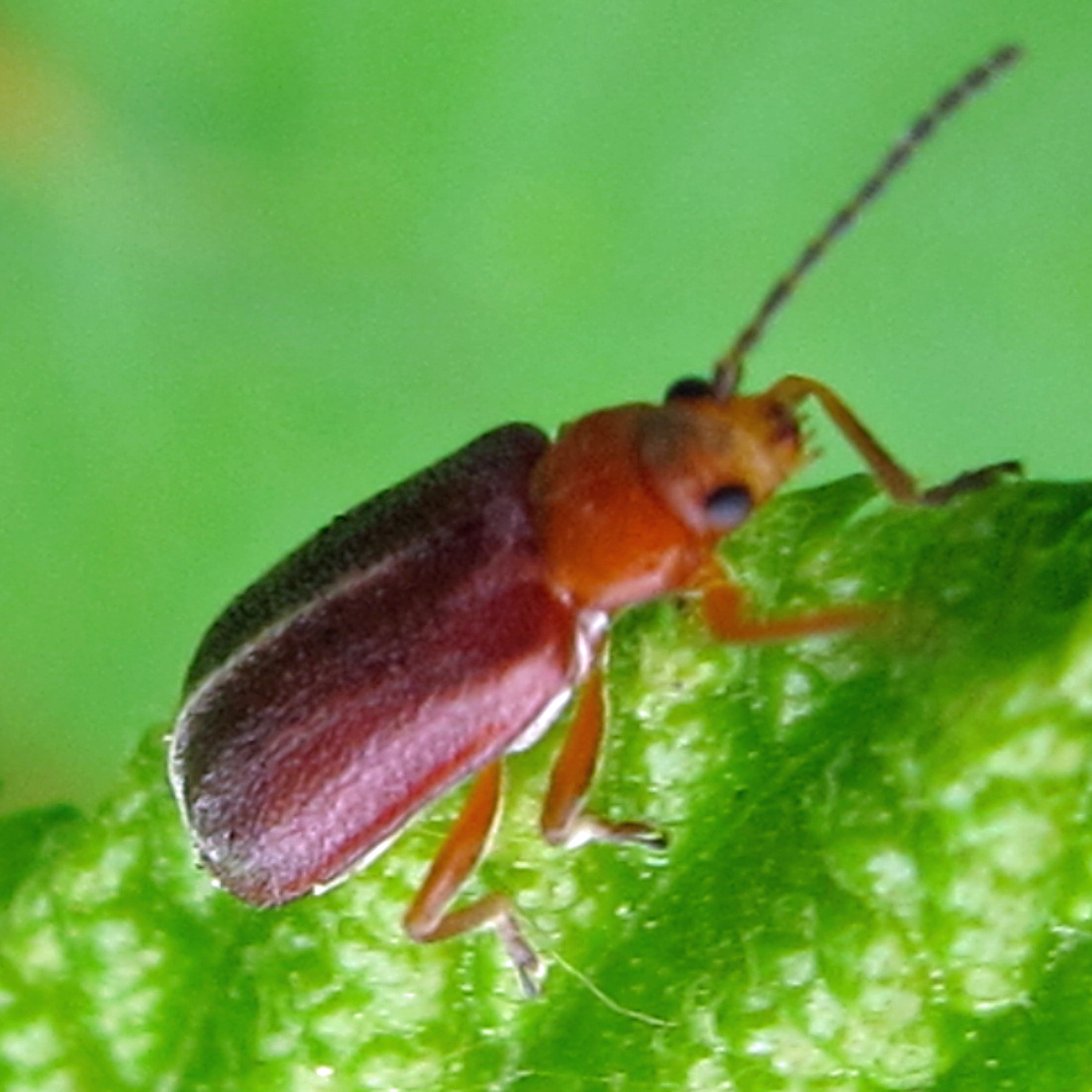

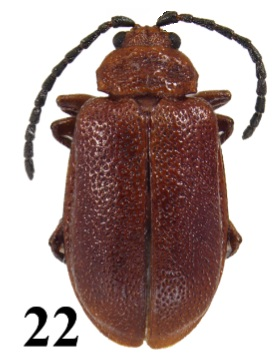

Scientific classification
- Kingdom: Animalia
- Phylum: Arthropoda
- Clade: Pancrustacea
- Class: Insecta
- Order: Coleoptera
- Suborder: Polyphaga
- Infraorder: Cucujiformia
- Family: Chrysomelidae
- Genus: Tricholochmaea
- Species: T. cavicollis

Binomial name
- Tricholochmaea cavicollis (J. L. LeConte, 1865)

Synonyms
- Pyrrhalta cavicollis LeConte, 1865

= Tricholochmaea cavicollis =

Species of beetle

Tricholochmaea cavicollis, the cherry leaf beetle, is a species of skeletonizing leaf beetle in the family Chrysomelidae. It is found in North America.
