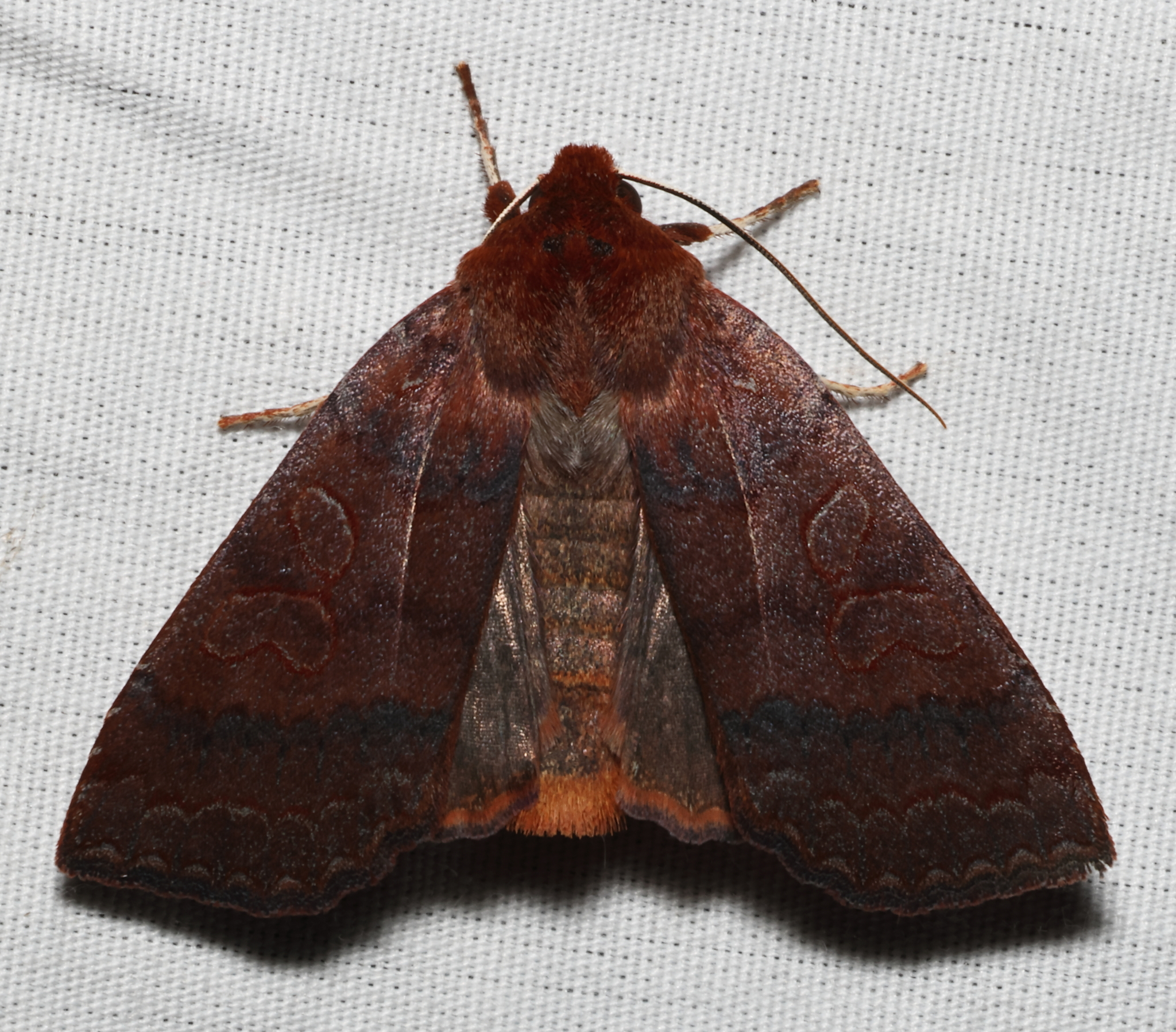

Scientific classification
- Kingdom: Animalia
- Phylum: Arthropoda
- Class: Insecta
- Order: Lepidoptera
- Superfamily: Noctuoidea
- Family: Noctuidae
- Tribe: Xylenini
- Subtribe: Xylenina
- Genus: Metaxaglaea
- Species: M. violacea

Binomial name
- Metaxaglaea violacea Schweitzer, 1979

= Metaxaglaea violacea =

Species of moth

Metaxaglaea violacea, the holly sallow, is a species of cutworm or dart moth in the family Noctuidae. It is found in North America.

The MONA or Hodges number for Metaxaglaea violacea is 9945.2.
