= Tricholochmaea vaccinii =

Scientific classification
- Kingdom: Animalia
- Phylum: Arthropoda
- Clade: Pancrustacea
- Class: Insecta
- Order: Coleoptera
- Suborder: Polyphaga
- Infraorder: Cucujiformia
- Family: Chrysomelidae
- Genus: Tricholochmaea
- Species: T. vaccinii

Binomial name
- Tricholochmaea vaccinii (Fall, 1924)

Species of beetle

Tricholochmaea vaccinii, the blueberry leaf beetle, is a species of skeletonizing leaf beetle in the family Chrysomelidae. It is found in North America.
