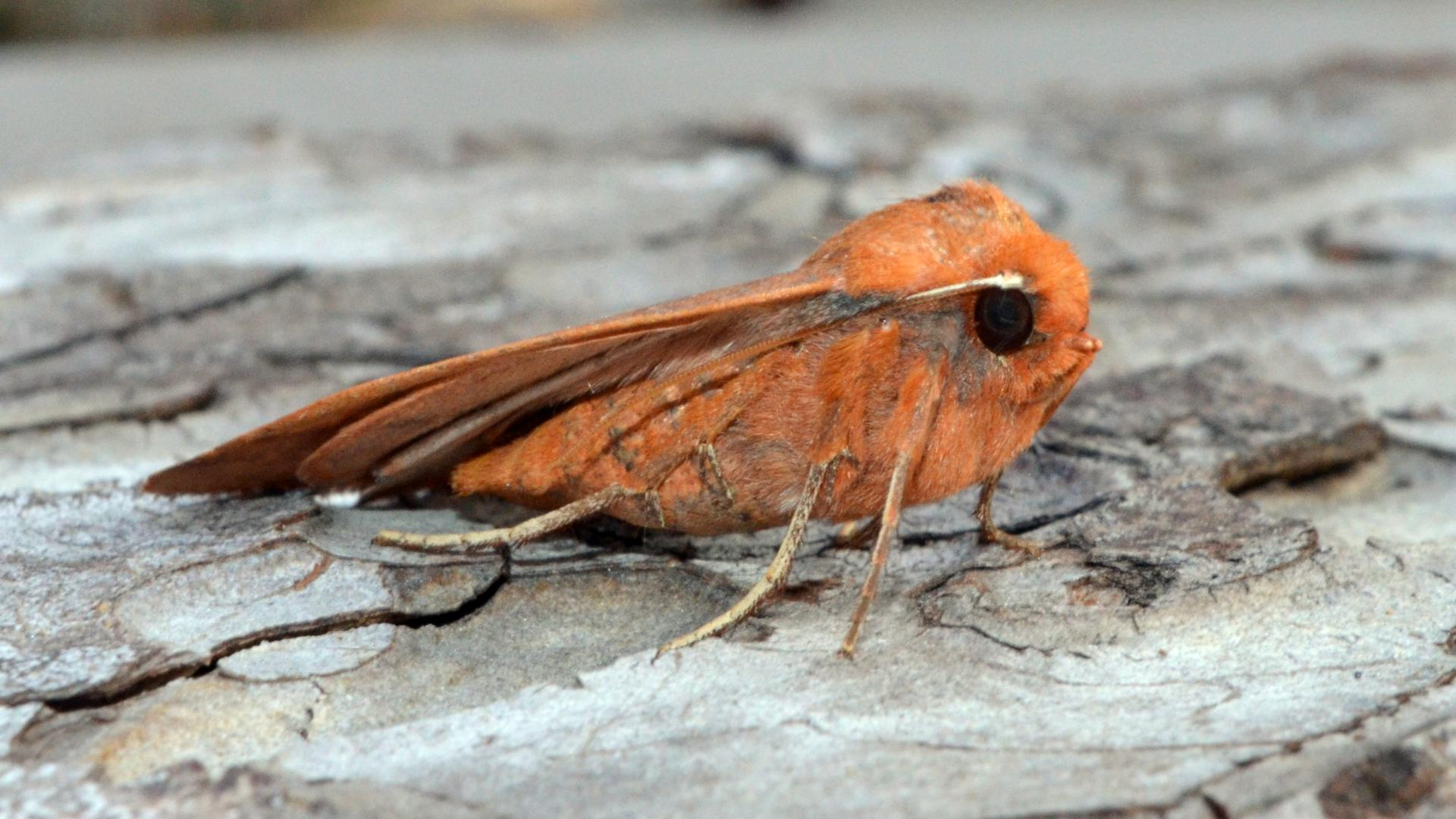

Scientific classification
- Domain: Eukaryota
- Kingdom: Animalia
- Phylum: Arthropoda
- Class: Insecta
- Order: Lepidoptera
- Superfamily: Noctuoidea
- Family: Noctuidae
- Genus: Metaxaglaea
- Species: M. semitaria

Binomial name
- Metaxaglaea semitaria Franclemont, 1968

= Metaxaglaea semitaria =

Species of moth

Metaxaglaea semitaria, the footpath sallow moth, is a species of cutworm or dart moth in the family Noctuidae. It is found in North America.

The MONA or Hodges number for Metaxaglaea semitaria is 9945.
