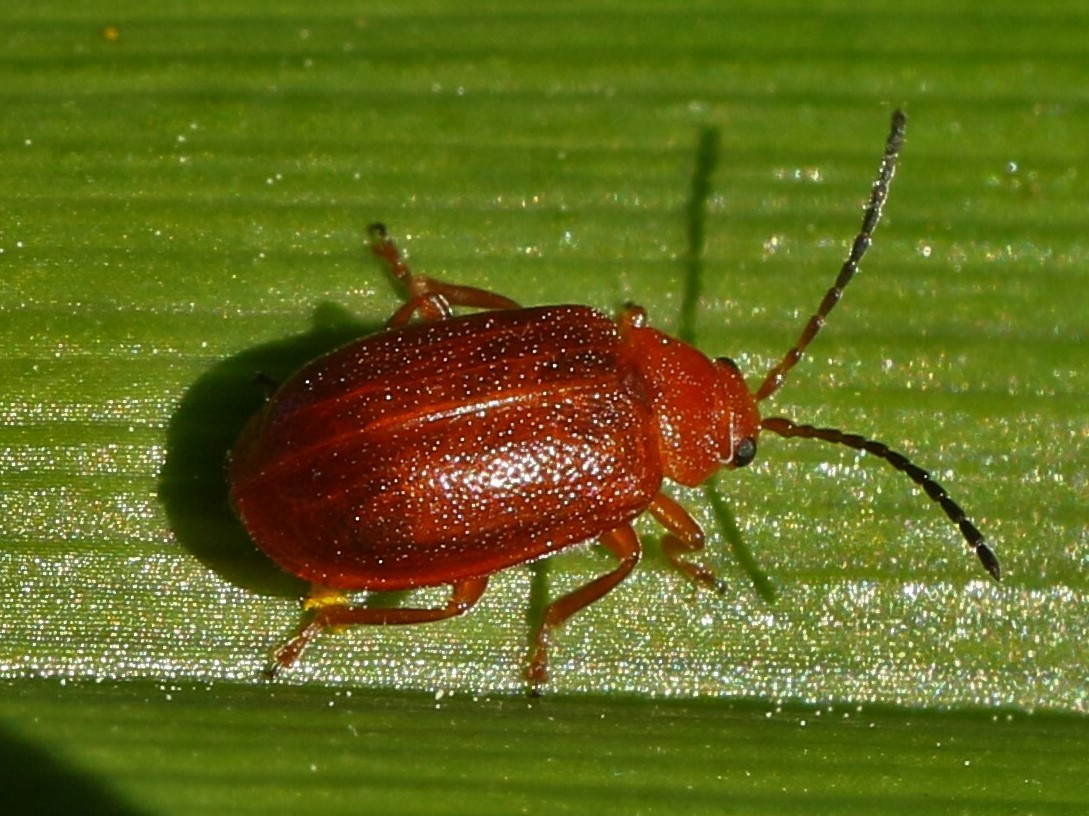

Scientific classification
- Kingdom: Animalia
- Phylum: Arthropoda
- Clade: Pancrustacea
- Class: Insecta
- Order: Coleoptera
- Suborder: Polyphaga
- Infraorder: Cucujiformia
- Family: Chrysomelidae
- Genus: Tricholochmaea
- Species: T. kalmiae

Binomial name
- Tricholochmaea kalmiae (Fall, 1924)

= Tricholochmaea kalmiae =

Species of beetle

Tricholochmaea kalmiae is a species of skeletonizing leaf beetle in the family Chrysomelidae. It is found in North America.
