= Tricholochmaea decora =

Scientific classification
- Kingdom: Animalia
- Phylum: Arthropoda
- Clade: Pancrustacea
- Class: Insecta
- Order: Coleoptera
- Suborder: Polyphaga
- Infraorder: Cucujiformia
- Family: Chrysomelidae
- Subfamily: Galerucinae
- Tribe: Galerucini
- Genus: Tricholochmaea
- Species: T. decora

Binomial name
- Tricholochmaea decora (Say, 1824)

Species of beetle

Tricholochmaea decora, known generally as the Pacific willow leaf beetle or gray willow leaf beetle, is a species of skeletonizing leaf beetle in the family Chrysomelidae. It is found in North America.

== Subspecies ==
- Tricholochmaea decora carbo (J. L. LeConte, 1861)
- Tricholochmaea decora decora (Say, 1824)
