= Tricholochmaea rufosanguinea =

Scientific classification
- Kingdom: Animalia
- Phylum: Arthropoda
- Clade: Pancrustacea
- Class: Insecta
- Order: Coleoptera
- Suborder: Polyphaga
- Infraorder: Cucujiformia
- Family: Chrysomelidae
- Genus: Tricholochmaea
- Species: T. rufosanguinea

Binomial name
- Tricholochmaea rufosanguinea (Say, 1826)

Species of beetle

Tricholochmaea rufosanguinea is a species of skeletonizing leaf beetle or flea beetle in the family Chrysomelidae. It is found in North America.
