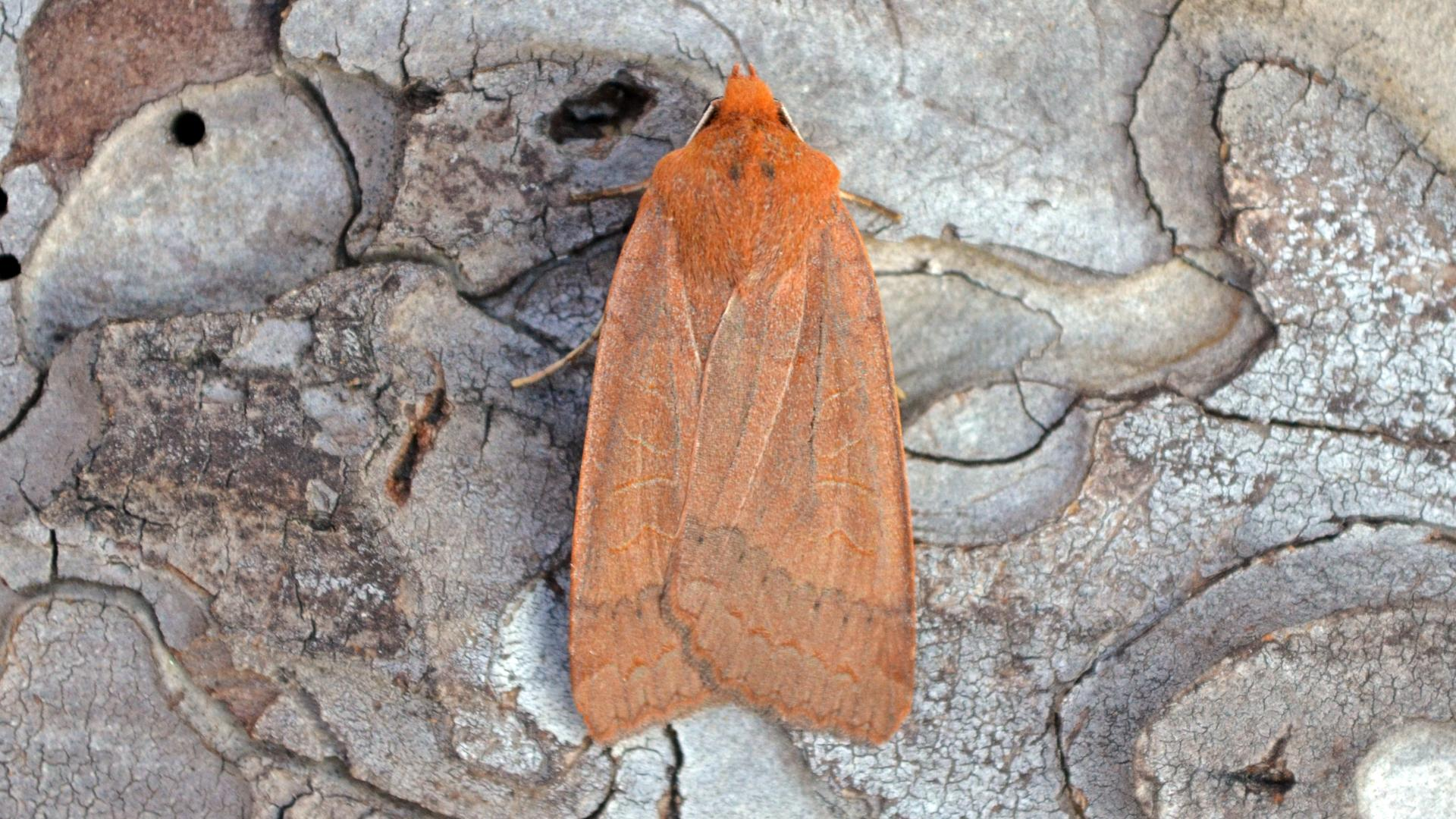

Scientific classification
- Kingdom: Animalia
- Phylum: Arthropoda
- Class: Insecta
- Order: Lepidoptera
- Superfamily: Noctuoidea
- Family: Noctuidae
- Genus: Metaxaglaea
- Species: M. viatica

Binomial name
- Metaxaglaea viatica (Grote, 1874)

Synonyms
- Orthosia viatica Grote, 1874

= Metaxaglaea viatica =

Species of moth

Metaxaglaea viatica, the roadside sallow moth, is a moth of the family Noctuidae. It is found in North America, where it has been recorded from Alabama, Arkansas, Florida, Georgia, Illinois, Indiana, Kansas, Kentucky, Maine, Maryland, Massachusetts, Michigan, New Hampshire, New Jersey, North Carolina, Ohio, Oklahoma, South Carolina, Tennessee, Texas, Virginia, West Virginia and Wisconsin.

The wingspan is about 50 mm. Adults have been recorded on wing from September to March.

The larvae feed on apple, crab apple, mountain ash and cherry.
