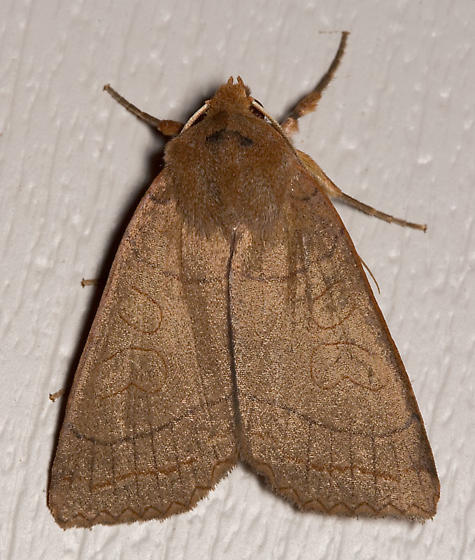
- Metaxaglaea inulta

Scientific classification
- Domain: Eukaryota
- Kingdom: Animalia
- Phylum: Arthropoda
- Class: Insecta
- Order: Lepidoptera
- Superfamily: Noctuoidea
- Family: Noctuidae
- Subtribe: Xylenina
- Genus: Metaxaglaea; Franclemont, 1937

= Metaxaglaea =

Genus of moths

Metaxaglaea is a genus of moths of the family Noctuidae.

== Species ==
- Metaxaglaea australis Schweitzer, 1979
- Metaxaglaea inulta (Grote, 1874)
- Metaxaglaea semitaria Franclemont, 1968
- Metaxaglaea viatica (Grote, 1874)
- Metaxaglaea violacea Schweitzer, 1979
