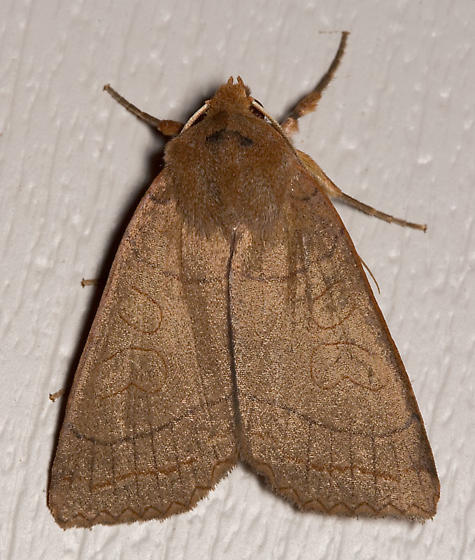

Scientific classification
- Kingdom: Animalia
- Phylum: Arthropoda
- Clade: Pancrustacea
- Class: Insecta
- Order: Lepidoptera
- Superfamily: Noctuoidea
- Family: Noctuidae
- Genus: Metaxaglaea
- Species: M. inulta

Binomial name
- Metaxaglaea inulta (Grote, 1874)

Synonyms
- Orthosia inulta Grote, 1874

= Metaxaglaea inulta =

Species of moth

Metaxaglaea inulta, the unsated sallow or arrowwood sallow, is a moth of the family Noctuidae. It is found from Nova Scotia to North Carolina, west to Missouri, north to Manitoba.

The wingspan is 40–48 mm. Adults are on wing from late August to November, sometimes even to January.

The larvae feed on the leaves of Viburnum species, including Viburnum dentatum, Viburnum lentago and Viburnum lantana.
