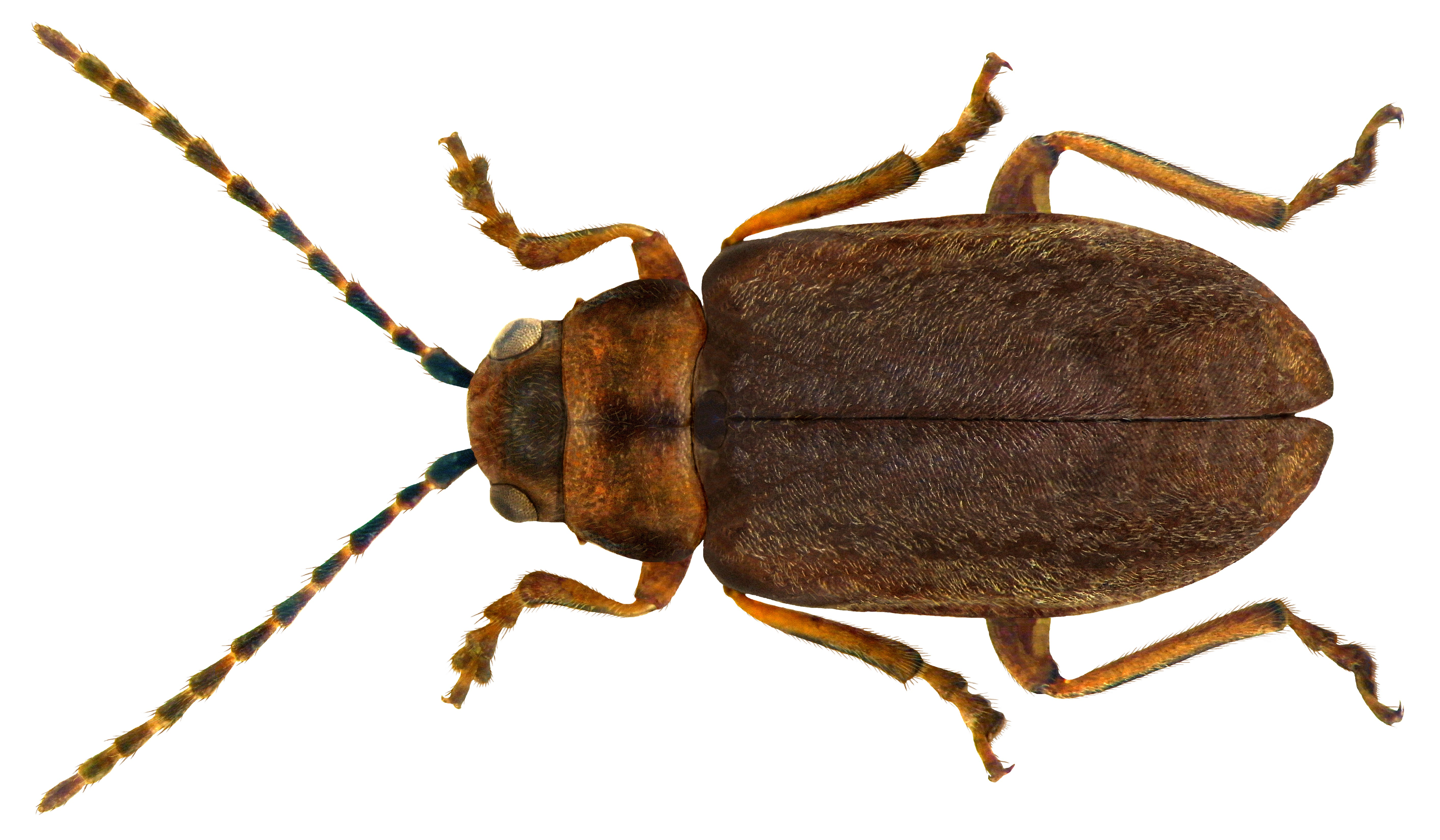
- Pyrrhalta viburni

Scientific classification
- Kingdom: Animalia
- Phylum: Arthropoda
- Clade: Pancrustacea
- Class: Insecta
- Order: Coleoptera
- Suborder: Polyphaga
- Infraorder: Cucujiformia
- Family: Chrysomelidae
- Subfamily: Galerucinae
- Tribe: Galerucini
- Genus: Pyrrhalta de Joannis, 1865

Species
- 111-115, see text

Synonyms
- Chapalia Laboissière, 1929; Decoomanius Laboissière, 1927; Hoplostines Blackburn, 1890

= Pyrrhalta =

Genus of beetles

Pyrrhalta is a genus of beetles in the leaf beetle family, Chrysomelidae. Species are distributed throughout much of the world, including much of the Northern Hemisphere and the Australian region.

== Description ==
Pyrrhalta is a genus of leaf beetles within the subfamily Galerucinae of the family Chrysomelidae, distributed across the Holarctic, Oriental, and Australian regions. Members of this genus are characterized by an elongated body shape, typically measuring between 4.5 and 6.5 mm in length. The coloration varies among species, often presenting hues ranging from yellowish to brown, with some exhibiting distinctive markings on the elytra. The head and thorax are generally covered with fine, dense hairs. The antennae are moderately long, usually extending to about half the body length, and are filiform in structure. The legs are slender, adapted for clinging to foliage, with tarsal claws that may exhibit a bifid structure. The pronotum is typically narrower than the elytra and may display punctate or smooth textures, depending on the species.

== Taxonomy ==
The taxonomy of the genus is not clear. Species are separated from those of other genera by the sometimes inconsistent comparison of questionable characters, such as the distribution of minute hairs. There is also little agreement on how to divide the group into subgenera. Former subgenera such as Xanthogaleruca are treated as separate genera by some authors, but not accepted as such by others.

A definition of the genus used by some authors includes characters such as a hairy pronotum and elytra, gena (the spaces below the eyes) longer than the eyes themselves, and a labrum with a line of hairy pores.

This is one of the largest genera of the leaf beetle subfamily Galerucinae, with about 111 to 115 species.

=== Selected species ===
Species include:

- Pyrrhalta aenescens (Fairmaire, 1878)
- Pyrrhalta angulaticollis (Gressitt & Kimoto, 1963)
- Pyrrhalta annulicornis (Baly, 1874)
- Pyrrhalta basifasciata Samoderzhenkov, 1988
- Pyrrhalta brunneipes (Gressitt & Kimoto, 1963)
- Pyrrhalta corpulenta (Gressitt & Kimoto, 1963)
- Pyrrhalta crassipunctata Yang in Yang, 1992
- Pyrrhalta curticollis Samoderzhenkov, 1988
- Pyrrhalta darjeelingensis Kimoto, 1979
- Pyrrhalta discalis (Gressitt & Kimoto, 1963)
- Pyrrhalta dorsalis (Chen, 1942)
- Pyrrhalta erosa (Hope, 1841)
- Pyrrhalta esakii Kimoto, 1963
- Pyrrhalta flavescens (Weise, 1887)
- Pyrrhalta fuscipennis (Jacoby, 1885)
- Pyrrhalta gracilicornis (Chen, 1942)
- Pyrrhalta gressitti Kimoto, 1969
- Pyrrhalta grisseovillosa (Jacoby, 1890)
- Pyrrhalta hainanensis (Gressitt & Kimoto, 1963)
- Pyrrhalta hanungus Samoderzhenkov, 1988
- Pyrrhalta huangshana (Chen, 1964)
- Pyrrhalta humeralis (Chen, 1942)
- Pyrrhalta hupehensis (Gressitt & Kimoto, 1963)
- Pyrrhalta igai Kimoto, 1981
- Pyrrhalta impressicollis Samoderzhenkov, 1988
- Pyrrhalta ishiharai Kimoto, 1994
- Pyrrhalta jeanvoinei (Laboissiere, 1929)
- Pyrrhalta kabakovi Samoderzhenkov, 1988
- Pyrrhalta kawashimai Kimoto, 1964
- Pyrrhalta konishii Kimoto, 1963
- Pyrrhalta kwangtungensis (Gressitt & Kimoto, 1963)
- Pyrrhalta limbatus (Laboissiere, 1927)
- Pyrrhalta longipilosa (Chen, 1942)
- Pyrrhalta luteola (Muller, 1766)
- Pyrrhalta maculata (Gressitt & Kimoto, 1963)
- Pyrrhalta maculicollis (Motschulsky, 1853)
- Pyrrhalta martensi Medvedev & Sprecher-Uebersax, 1999
- Pyrrhalta medvedevi Sprecher-Uebersax & Zoia, 2002
- Pyrrhalta meghalayana Medvedev, 2002
- Pyrrhalta metallica (Gressitt & Kimoto, 1963)
- Pyrrhalta microphthalma Samoderzhenkov, 1988
- Pyrrhalta nigricornis Ohno, 1962
- Pyrrhalta nigromaculata Yang in Yang, 1992
- Pyrrhalta nigromarginata (Jacoby, 1885)
- Pyrrhalta ningpoensis (Gressitt & Kimoto, 1963)
- Pyrrhalta ohbayashii Kimoto, 1984
- Pyrrhalta orientalis (Ogloblin, 1936)
- Pyrrhalta ornatipennis Samoderzhenkov, 1988
- Pyrrhalta prokofievi
- Pyrrhalta ruficollis (Gressitt & Kimoto, 1963)
- Pyrrhalta seminigra (Jacoby, 1885)
- Pyrrhalta sericea (Weise, 1889)
- Pyrrhalta shirozui Kimoto, 1969
- Pyrrhalta sikanga (Gressitt & Kimoto, 1963)
- Pyrrhalta silfverbergi Lopatin, 2005
- Pyrrhalta subaenea (Ogloblin, 1936)
- Pyrrhalta subcoerulescens (Weise, 1884)
- Pyrrhalta submetallics (Chen, 1942)
- Pyrrhalta sulcatipennis (Chen, 1942)
- Pyrrhalta taiwana Kimoto, 1969
- Pyrrhalta takizawai Kimoto, 1996
- Pyrrhalta tatesuji Kimoto, 2001
- Pyrrhalta tianmuensis (Chen, 1964)
- Pyrrhalta tibialis (Baly, 1874)
- Pyrrhalta tuberculata (Say, 1824)
- Pyrrhalta tumida (Gressitt & Kimoto, 1963)
- Pyrrhalta viburni (Paykull, 1799) - viburnum leaf beetle
- Pyrrhalta viridipennis Kimoto, 1981
- Pyrrhalta warchalowskii
- Pyrrhalta wilcoxi (Gressitt & Kimoto, 1965)
- Pyrrhalta xizangana Chen & Jiang, 1981
- Pyrrhalta yasumatsui Kimoto, 1964

== Habitat ==
Pyrrhalta is a genus within the Chrysomelidae family, encompassing several species of leaf beetles, each with distinct habitat preferences. Notably, Pyrrhalta viburni, commonly known as the viburnum leaf beetle, is native to Europe and Asia but has expanded its range to North America. This species predominantly inhabits regions where Viburnum species are present, as both larvae and adults feed exclusively on these plants. In North America, P. viburni has been documented in various northeastern states, where it has spread extensively, posing a threat to native and cultivated Viburnum populations. A spread southward has been indicated, however, the spread is suggested to be limited by the necessity for prolonged chilling periods to properly develop their eggs.

Another species, Pyrrhalta luteola, known as the elm leaf beetle, originates from the Palearctic region. It has been introduced to multiple areas, including North America, Argentina, Chile, Central Asia, the Middle East, North Africa, Siberia, and South Africa. This beetle primarily inhabits regions where elm trees (Ulmus spp.) are found, as they serve as its primary host plants. The elm leaf beetle is often encountered in urban landscapes, particularly in areas where elm trees are prevalent.

The habitats of Pyrrhalta species are closely linked to the distribution of their host plants. Consequently, these beetles are typically found in environments such as forests, woodlands, urban parks, and gardens where suitable host plants are abundant. The expansion of their range, especially in non-native regions, is often facilitated by the widespread planting of their preferred host species.

== Morphology ==
Larvae of Pyrrhalta species are typically greenish-yellow upon hatching, developing dark spots as they mature, giving them a darker appearance. Mature larvae measure approximately 10 to 11 mm in length and have a slightly depressed, sub-cylindrical body shape.

The internal sac of the male aedeagus in certain Pyrrhalta species bears hand saw-like spines arranged in a row, which are used during copulation. These spines can cause wounds to the female's reproductive tract, a phenomenon known as traumatic insemination.

Morphological variations, such as differences in elytral coloration and genitalia structure, are used to differentiate species within the genus. For instance, some species exhibit entirely black elytra, while others have distinct colour patterns. Detailed examination of these traits, including the morphology of the aedeagus and internal sac spines, is essential for accurate species identification.

== Life cycle ==
The insect displays a univoltine breeding pattern with one generation of offspring per year. This includes an egg, larvae, pupa and an adult stage of life. The females lay the eggs on the underside of leaves coated with a protective layer they secrete. Eggs are laid anytime in the warmer months to protect against freezing. These insects can be susceptible to parasites during the pupal stages of development. Once infected the insects chances of the insect reaching adulthood decreases considerably. The larva and adult stages can be destructive to foliage by feeding heavily on viburnum species.

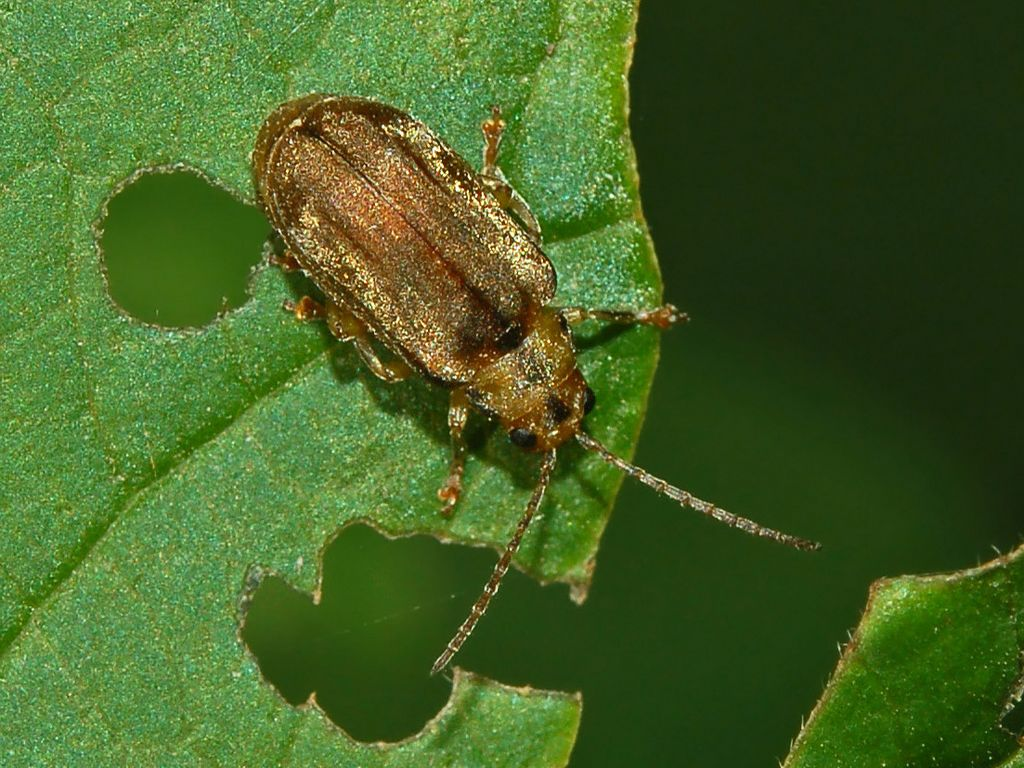
Female Pyrrhalta viburni feeding

== Threats to agriculture ==
A number of Pyrrhalta are considered pests. The species Pyrrhalta viburni has received attention as a Eurasian beetle introduced to North America with the potential to do significant damage to native and cultivated viburnum plants.
