= Viburnum carolinianum =

Scientific classification
- Kingdom: Plantae
- Clade: Tracheophytes
- Clade: Angiosperms
- Clade: Eudicots
- Clade: Asterids
- Order: Dipsacales
- Family: Adoxaceae
- Genus: Viburnum
- Species: V. carolinianum

Binomial name
- Viburnum carolinianum Ashe

Species of flowering shrub

Viburnum carolinianum, the Carolina arrowwood, is a species of deciduous flowering shrub in the family Viburnaceae. They are found in the southern Appalachians as well as southern parts of the Ridge and Valley and Appalachian Plateau regions. Their typical habitats are moist to dry forests, rock outcrops, and streambanks. They bear white flowers in spring that ripen to gray-blue drupes in late summer.
