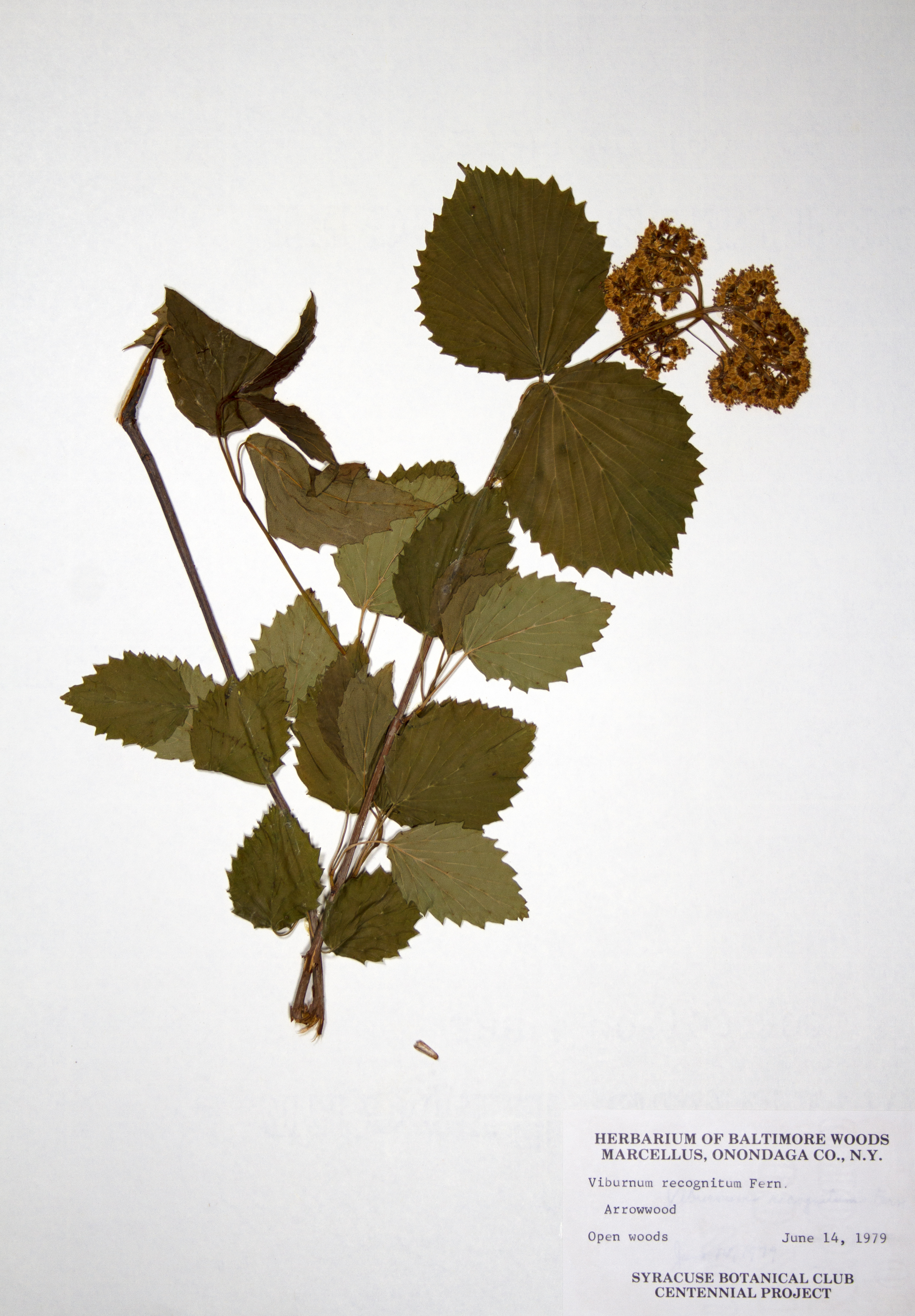
- Herbarium specimen

Conservation status
- Apparently Secure (NatureServe)

Scientific classification
- Kingdom: Plantae
- Clade: Tracheophytes
- Clade: Angiosperms
- Clade: Eudicots
- Clade: Asterids
- Order: Dipsacales
- Family: Adoxaceae
- Genus: Viburnum
- Species: V. recognitum

Binomial name
- Viburnum recognitum Fernald

Synonyms
- Viburnum ashei Bush; Viburnum dentatum var. lucidum Aiton

= Viburnum recognitum =

Species of flowering plant

Viburnum recognitum, variously called the northern arrowwood, southern arrowwood, and smooth arrow-wood, is a species of flowering plant in the family Viburnaceae. It is native to eastern Canada, and the central and eastern United States. A shrub or small shrubby tree, they are typically found in wetter habitats such as stream banks, bottomlands, swamps, and mesic woodlands. It is closely related to, and may be a subtaxon of, Viburnum dentatum, the southern arrowwood or roughish arrowwood.

The plant is considered by NatureServe to be critically imperiled in Missouri and Arkansas and imperiled in the Canadian province of Quebec, with an overall status of "apparently secure".
