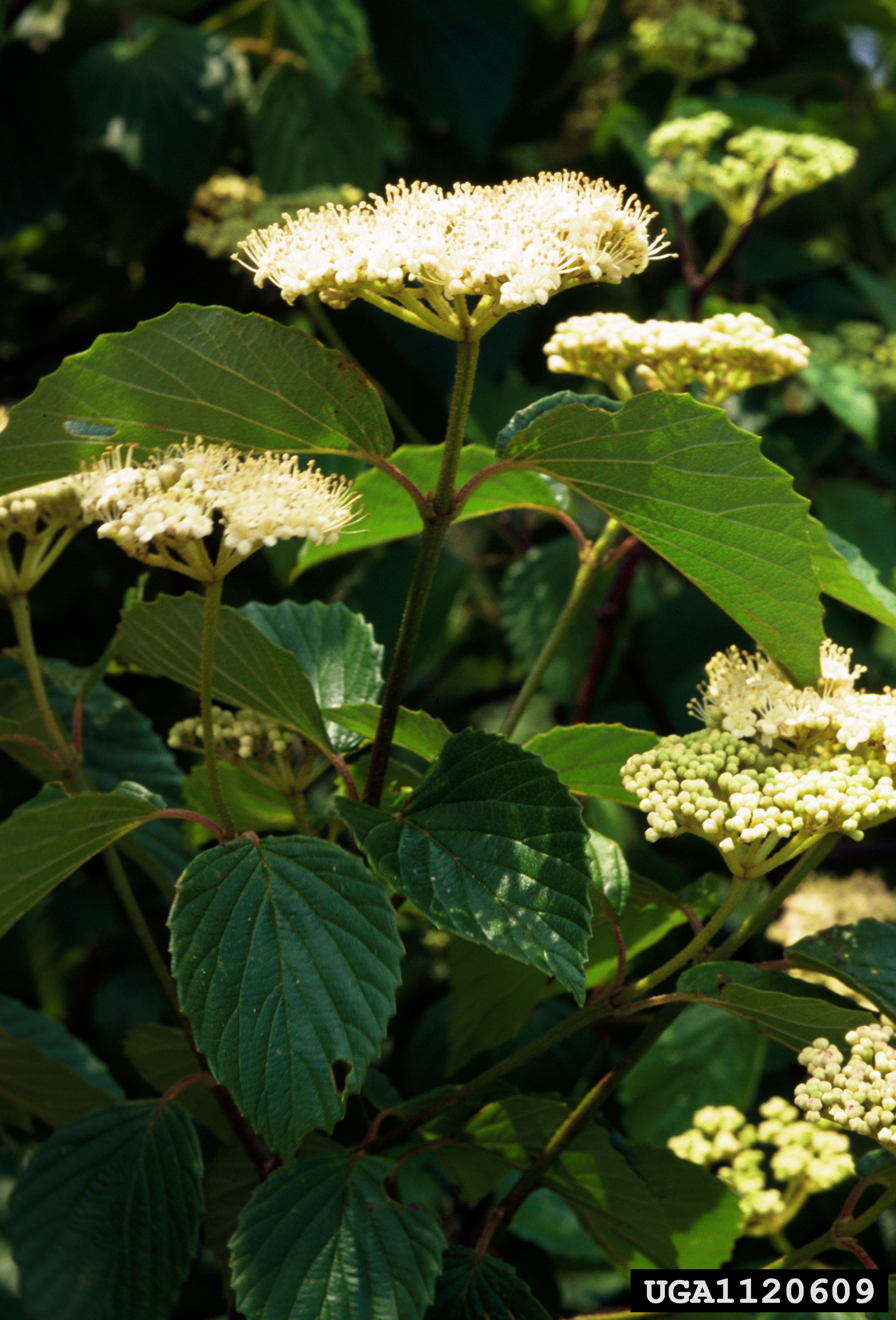

Conservation status
- Secure (NatureServe)

Scientific classification
- Kingdom: Plantae
- Clade: Tracheophytes
- Clade: Angiosperms
- Clade: Eudicots
- Clade: Asterids
- Order: Dipsacales
- Family: Adoxaceae
- Genus: Viburnum
- Species: V. dentatum

Binomial name
- Viburnum dentatum L.
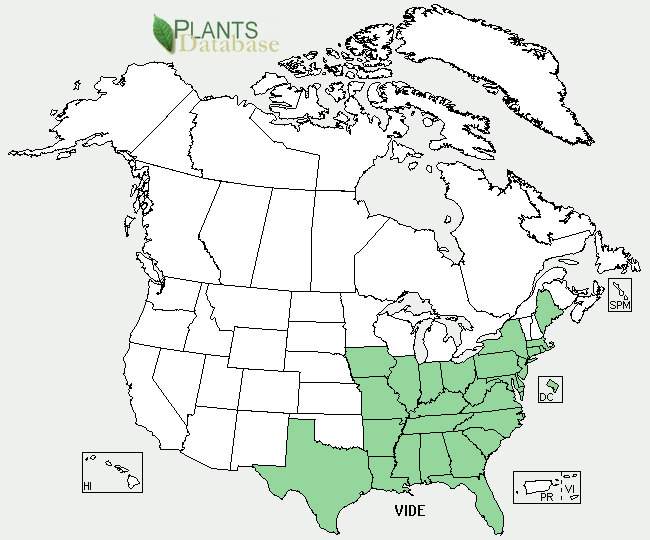
- Natural range in the United States (Canadian range not shown)

= Viburnum dentatum =

Species of shrub

Viburnum dentatum, southern arrowwood or arrowwood viburnum or roughish arrowwood, is a small shrub, native to the eastern United States and Canada from Maine south to northern Florida and eastern Texas.

Like most Viburnum, it has opposite, simple leaves and fruit in berry-like drupes. Foliage turns yellow to red in late fall. Localized variations of the species are common over its entire geographic range. Common differences include leaf size and shape and placement of pubescence on leaf undersides and petioles.

V. dentatum occurs in habitat types such as upland mixed woodlands, mesic pine-oak woods, hardwood hammocks, and floodplains.

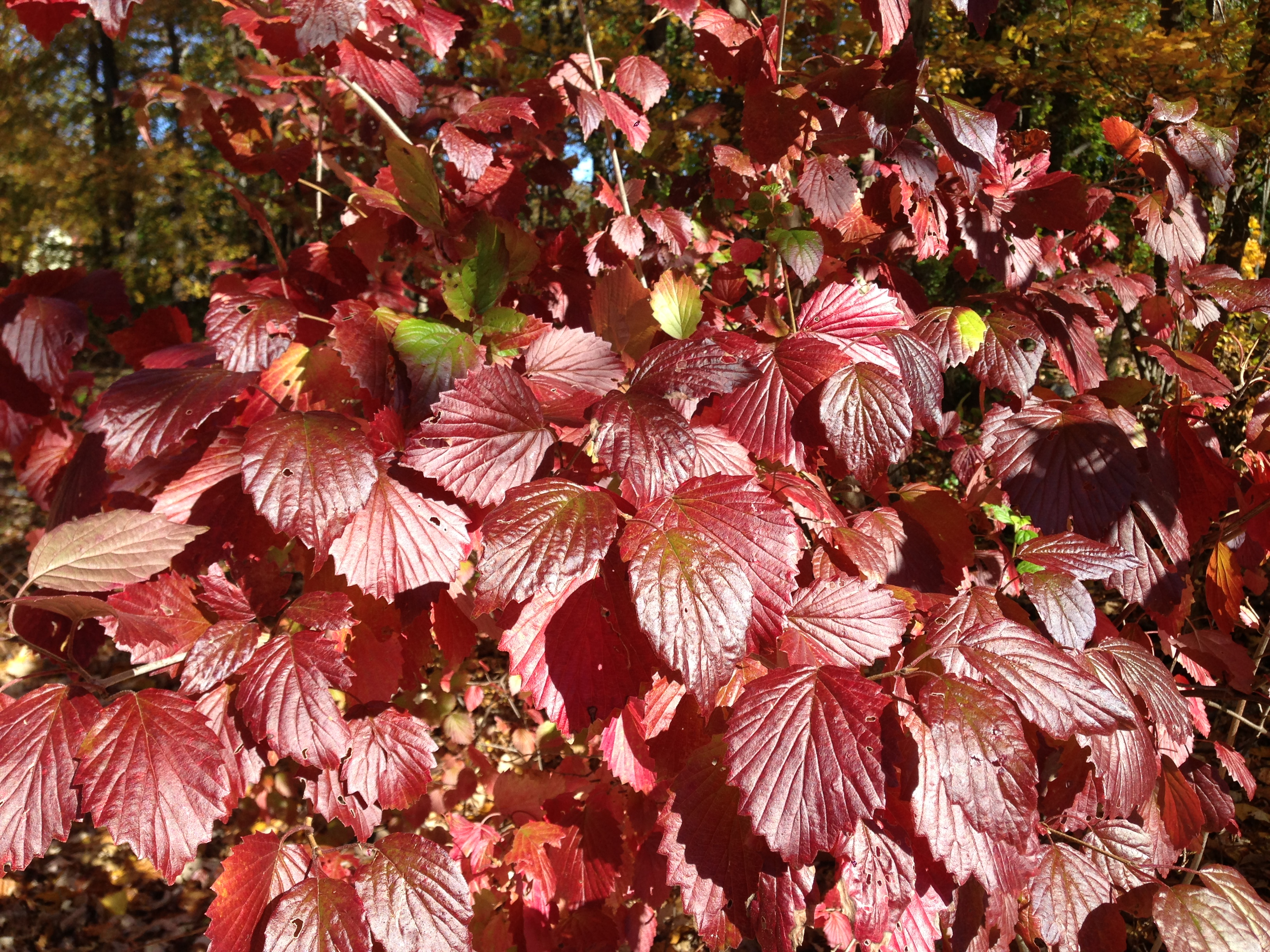
Leaves in autumn

Some moth larvae feed on V. dentatum. Known such species include the unsated sallow (or arrowwood sallow; Metaxaglaea inulta) and Phyllonorycter viburnella. It is also consumed by the viburnum leaf beetle (Pyrrhalta viburni), an invasive species from Eurasia. The fruits are a food source for songbirds. Berries contain 41.3% fat.

The fruits appear blue. The major pigments are cyanidin 3-glucoside, cyanidin 3-sambubioside, and cyanidin 3-vicianoside, but the total mixture is very complex.

Native Americans used the young stems to make arrow shafts.

== Varieties ==
- Viburnum dentatum var. deamii (Rehder) Fernald
- Viburnum dentatum var. dentatum
- Viburnum dentatum var. lucidum Fernald – currently considered a separate species; Viburnum recognitum, the northern arrowwood, or smooth arrowwood
- Viburnum dentatum var. venosum (Britton) Gleason
