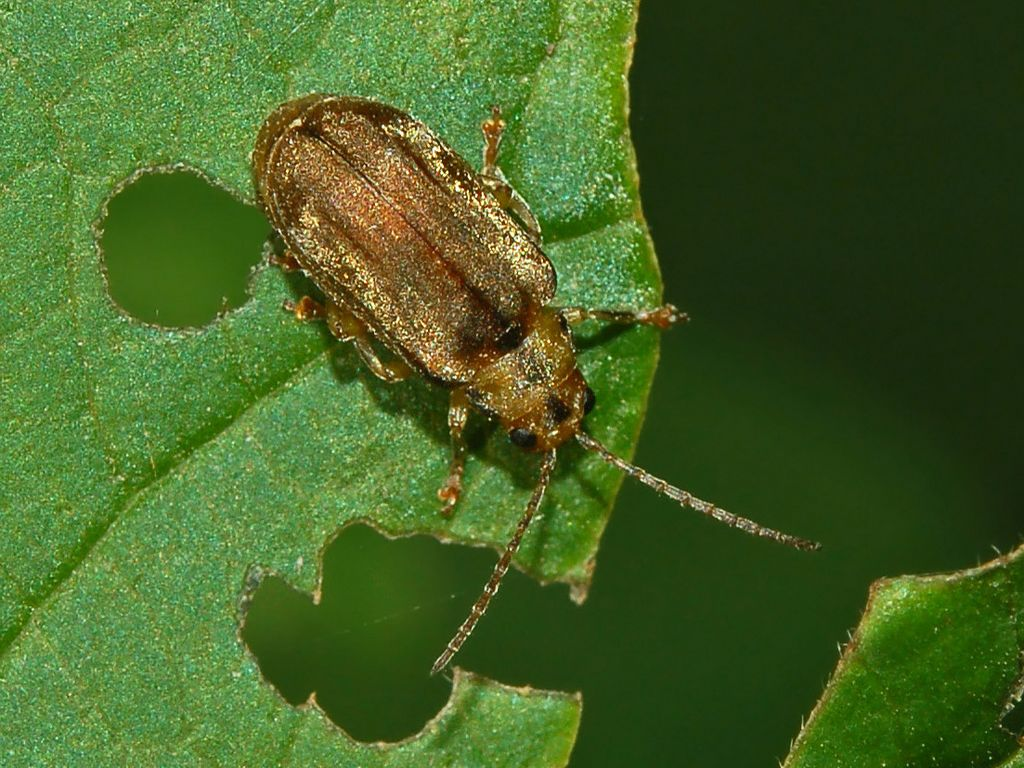
- Dorsal view
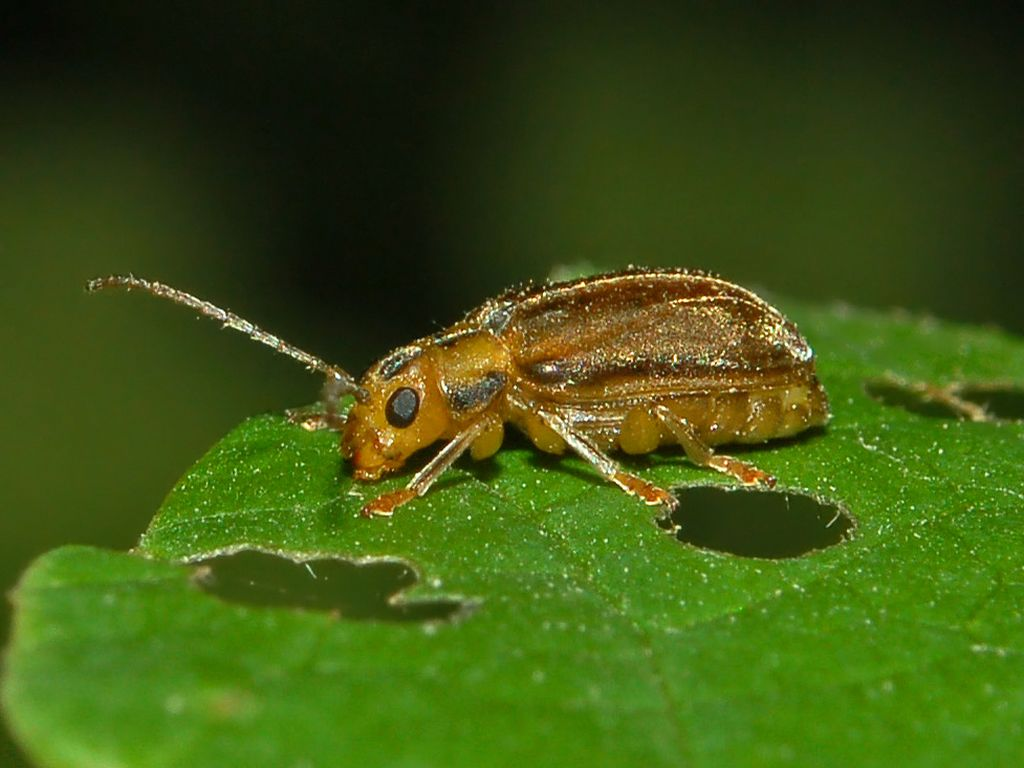
- Lateral view

Scientific classification
- Kingdom: Animalia
- Phylum: Arthropoda
- Clade: Pancrustacea
- Class: Insecta
- Order: Coleoptera
- Suborder: Polyphaga
- Infraorder: Cucujiformia
- Family: Chrysomelidae
- Subfamily: Galerucinae
- Tribe: Galerucini
- Genus: Pyrrhalta
- Species: P. viburni

Binomial name
- Pyrrhalta viburni (Paykull, 1799)

Synonyms
- Galeruca viburni Paykull, 1799

= Viburnum leaf beetle =

Species of leaf beetle

Pyrrhalta viburni is a species of leaf beetle native to Europe and Asia, commonly known as the viburnum leaf beetle. It was first detected in North America in 1947 in Ontario, Canada. However, specimens had been collected in Annapolis Royal, Nova Scotia in 1924. In 1996 it was discovered in a park in New York, where native plantings of arrowwood (Viburnum dentatum complex) were found to be heavily damaged by larval feeding. The UK-based Royal Horticultural Society stated that its members reported Pyrrhalta viburni as the "number one pest species" in 2010.

The spined soldier bug, Podisus maculiventris is used and developed as a biological control agent against the beetle.

== Description ==
Adult viburnum leaf beetles range from 4.5-6.5 mm in size, while mature larvae are roughly between 10 and 11 mm. It has a brown head, thorax and elytra with dense golden-grey hair on its dorsal surface.

== Life cycle ==
Viburnum leaf beetles go through one new generation of offspring per year. Eggs are laid throughout the summer and into October. Female beetles burrow into the underside viburnum terminal twigs and create 'spaces' in pith tissue. Then they lay eggs in clusters of 5-6 and cover them with frass. Eggs overwinter in these cavities where they are protected from water loss and predation. Females prefer to place their eggs near where other females have in previous years The eggs hatch by mid-May, after hatching, the larvae feed and grow successively bigger through three instars. Ultimately, they pupate in the soil and emerge as adults in late June or early July.

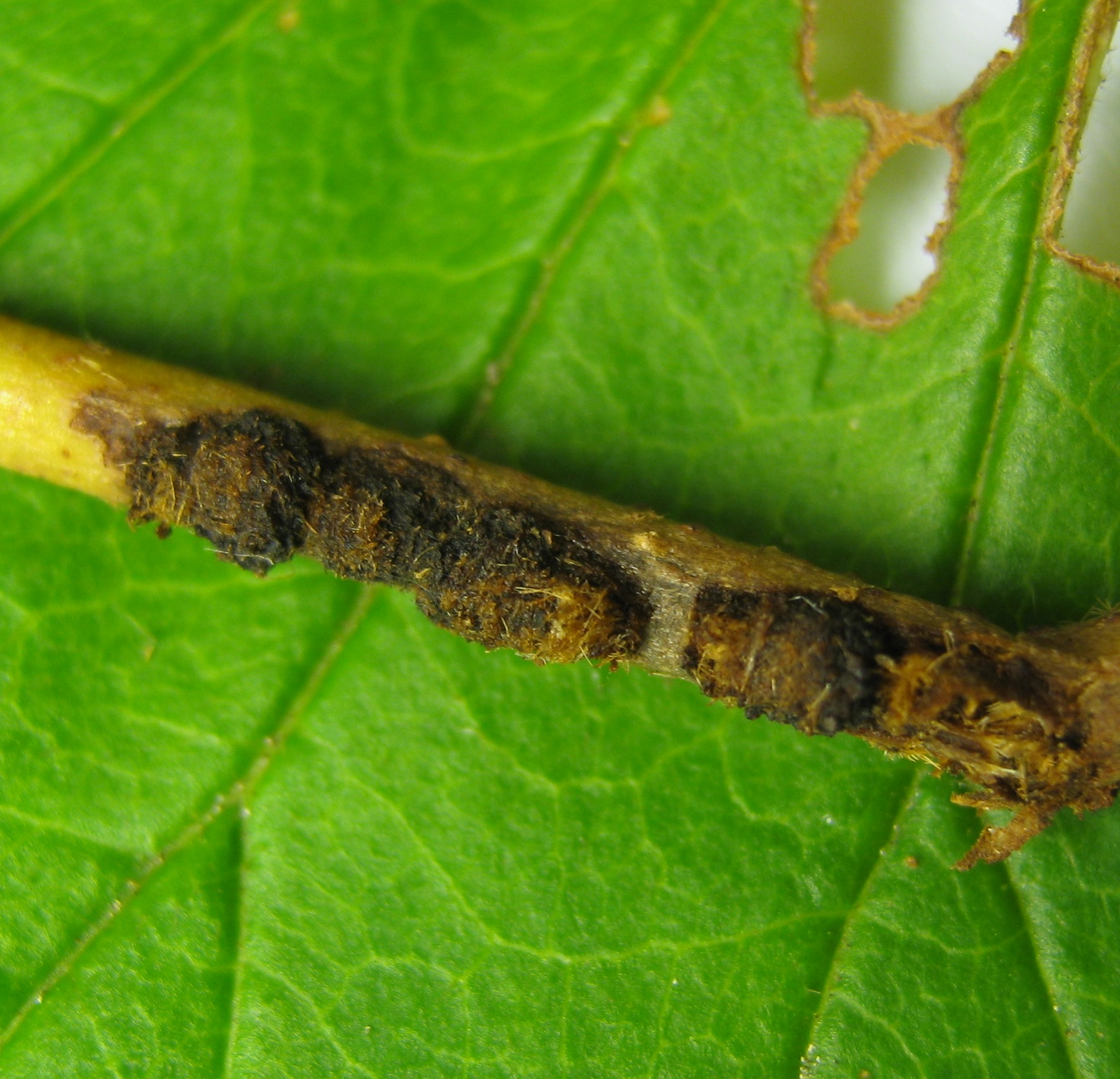
Egg cases

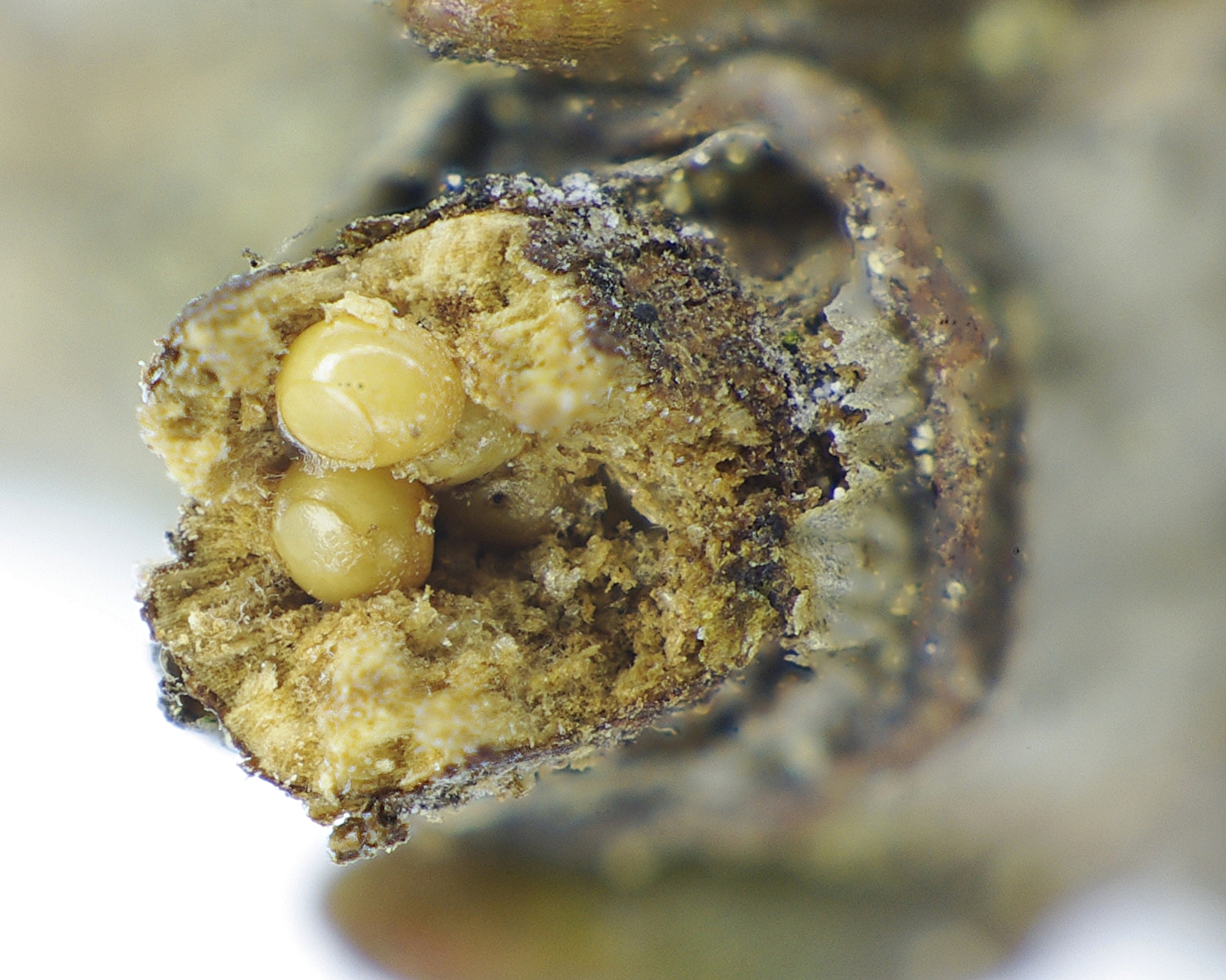
Eggs

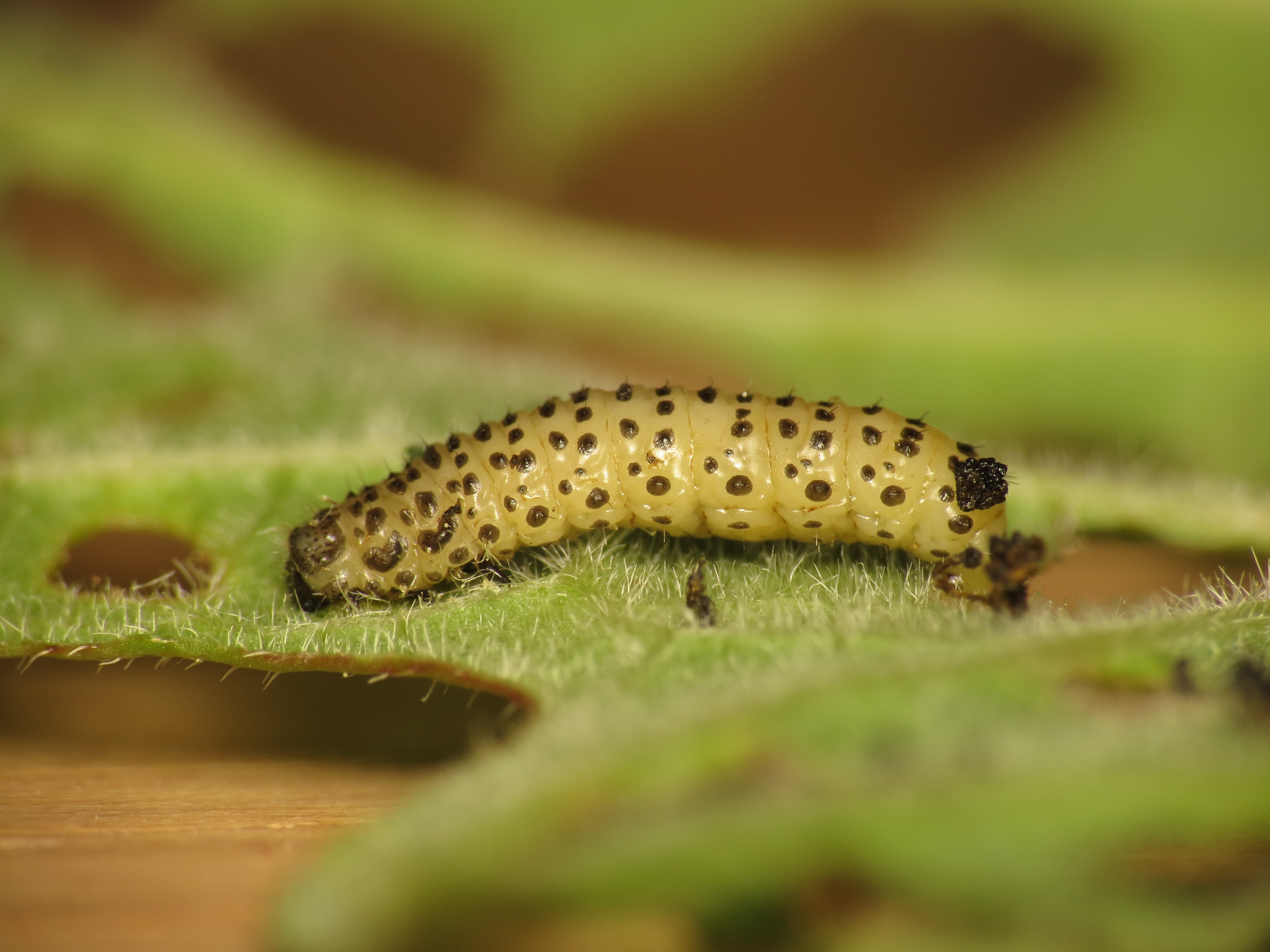
Larva

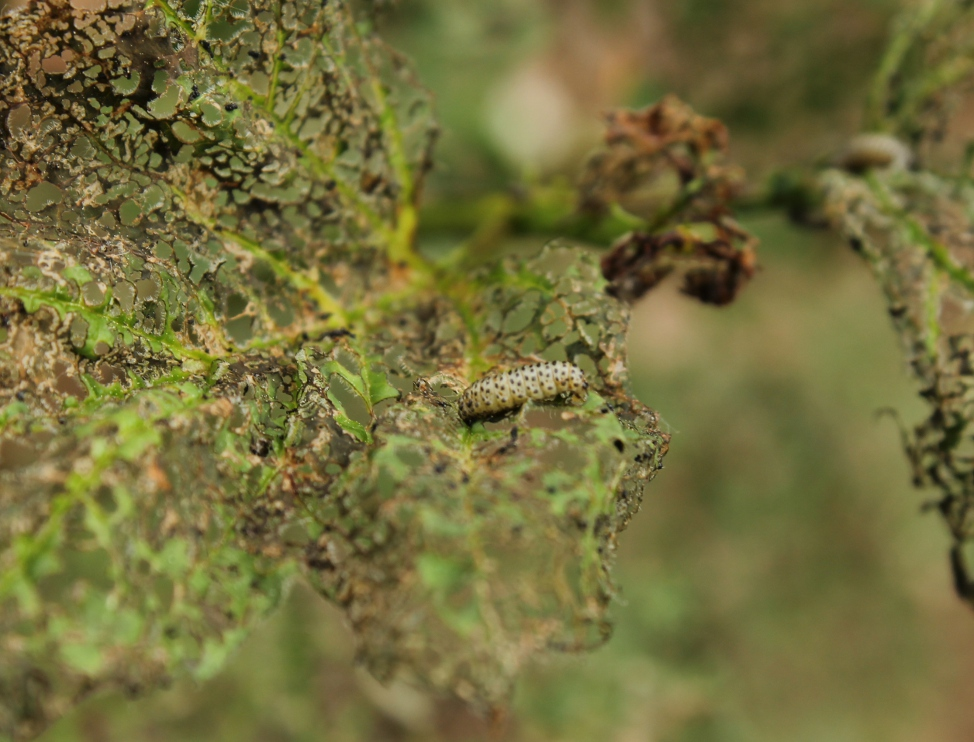
Leaf damage

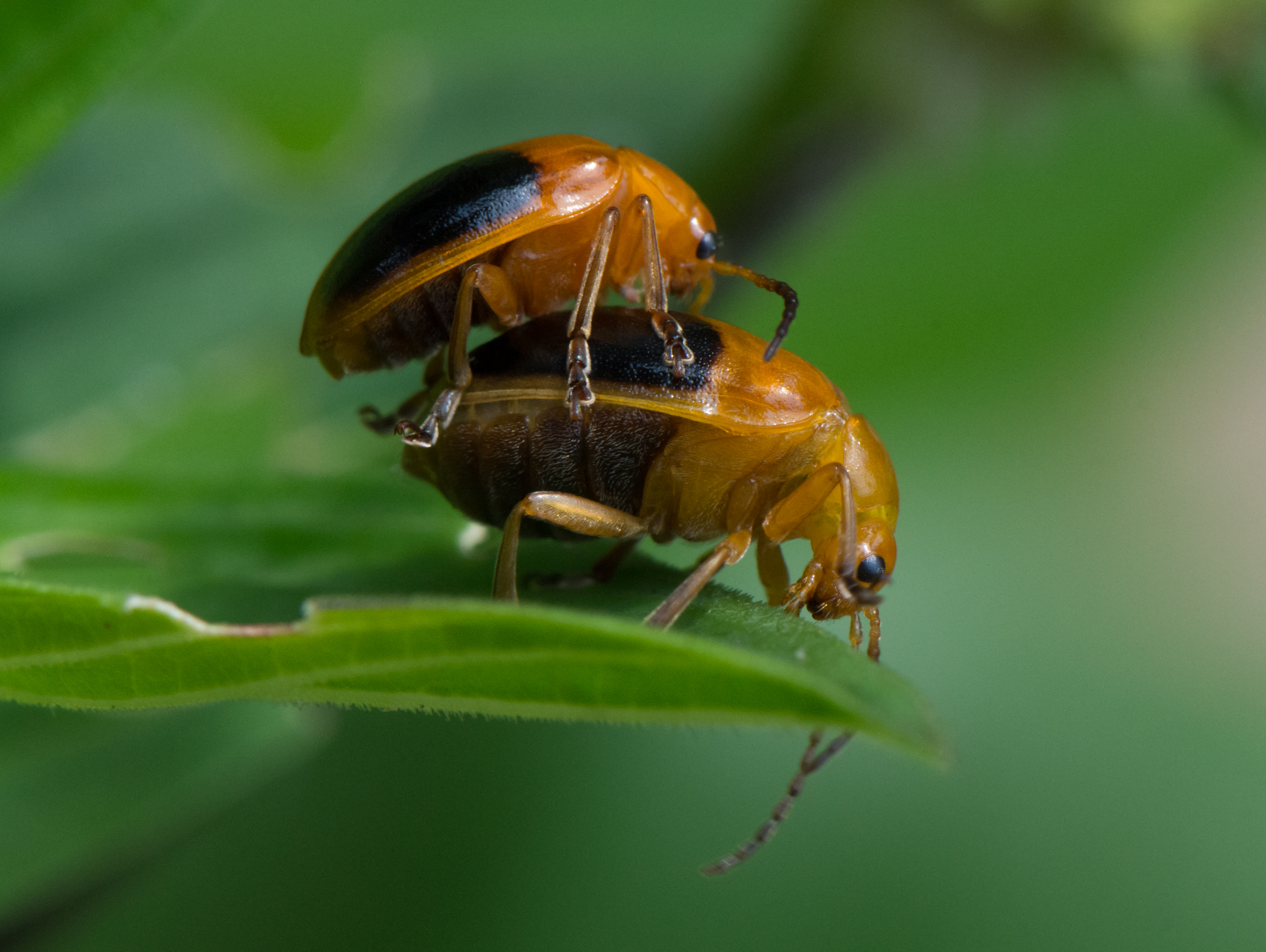
Mating

== Host Plants ==
Both the larvae and the adults consume the leaves of Viburnum species, but at different times of the year, the larvae during the spring, and the adults during the summer. Plants may end up being completely defoliated due to their feeding activities, sometimes resulting in their death. Although, certain species appear to be more preferable to the beetles than others.
