= List of Apiaceae genera =

This is a list of genera belonging to the family Apiaceae. It contains all the genera listed by Plants of the World Online (PoWO) as of December 2022. A few extra genus names are included that PoWO regards as synonyms. Unless otherwise indicated, the placement of genera into sub-taxa is based on the taxonomy used by the Germplasm Resources Information Network (GRIN). "Not assigned" means either that the genus is unplaced in GRIN or that it is not listed by GRIN.

== Not assigned to a subfamily (Apiaceae incertae sedis) ==
In a 2021 molecular phylogenetic study, the Platysace clade and the genera Klotzschia and Hermas fell outside the four subfamilies. It has been suggested that they could be placed in subfamilies of their own.

- Brachyscias J. M. Hart & Henwood
- Grafia Rchb.
- Hermas L.
- Kelussia Mozaff.
- Klotzschia Cham.
- Platysace Bunge
- Polyzygus Dalzell
- Ptychotis W. D. J. Koch

== Subfamily unknown ==
Genera accepted by Plants of the World Online which are not placed by GRIN

- Actinanthus Ehrenb.
- Agasyllis Spreng.
- Angoseseli Chiov.
- Asciadium Griseb.
- Austropeucedanum Mathias & Constance
- Caropodium Stapf & Wettst.
- Karnataka P. K. Mukh. & Constance
- Kenopleurum Candargy
- Lomatocarum Fisch. & C.A.Mey.
- Normantha P.J.D.Winter & B.-E.van Wyk
- Opoidia Lindl.
- Palimbia Besser ex DC.
- Paraselinum H. Wolff
- Pedinopetalum Urb. & H. Wolff
- Physotrichia Hiern
- Pseudoselinum C. Norman
- Registaniella Rech.f.
- Rhizomatophora Pimenov
- Rhopalosciadium Rech.f.
- Rhysopterus J.M.Coult. & Rose
- Schoenoselinum Jim.Mejías & P.Vargas
- Siculosciadium C.Brullo, Brullo, S.R.Downie & Giusso
- Sivadasania N.Mohanan & Pimenov
- Spiroceratium H.Wolff
- Stewartiella Nasir
- Tamamschjania Pimenov & Kljuykov
- Thamnosciadium Hartvig
- Tricholaser Gilli
- Tschulaktavia Bajtenov ex Pimenov & Kljuykov
- †Umbelliferospermum Berry, 1929
- Vinogradovia Bani, D.A.German & M.A.Koch
- Xatardia Meisn. & Zeyh.

== Subfamily Apioideae ==
=== Not assigned to a tribe ===
- Acronema Falc. ex Edgew.
- Azilia Hedge & Lamond
- Bilacunaria Pimenov & V.N.Tikhom
- Bonannia Guss.
- Cachrys L.
- Cenolophium W.D.J.Koch
- Conioselinum Hoffm.
- Conium L.
- Dactylaea Fedde ex H. Wolff
- Dethawia Endl.
- Diplolophium Turcz.
- Diplotaenia Boiss.
- Ergocarpon C. C. Towns.
- Ferulago W.D.J.Koch
- Hansenia Turcz.
- Harrysmithia H.Wolff
- Heptaptera Margot & Reut.
- Hymenolaena DC.
- Keraymonia Farille
- Krubera Hoffm.
- Kuramosciadium Pimenov et al.
- Levisticum Hill
- Ligusticum L.
- Lithosciadium Turcz.
- Magydaris W.D.J.Koch ex DC.
- Meeboldia H.Wolff
- Meum Mill.
- Mutellina Wolf
- Neogaya Meisn.
- Opopanax W.D.J.Koch
- Oreocomopsis Pimenov & Kljuykov
- Pachypleurum Ledeb.
- Paulita Soják
- Petroedmondia Tamamsch.
- Physospermopsis H.Wolff
- Pleurospermopsis C.Norman
- Prangos Lindl.
- Pternopetalum Franch.
- Pterygopleurum Kitag.
- Rivasmartinezia Fern.Prieto & Cires
- Rohmooa Farille & Lachard
- Rupiphila Pimenov & Lavrova
- Sclerochorton Boiss.
- Seselopsis Schischk.
- Shomalia Lyskov
- Silaum Mill.
- Sinocarum H.Wolff ex R.H.Shan & F.T.Pu
- Sinolimprichtia H.Wolff
- Smyrniopsis Boiss.
- Sphaenolobium Pimenov
- Stefanoffia H.Wolff
- Synclinostyles Farille & Lachard
- Tilingia Regel
- Tongoloa H.Wolff
- Trochiscanthes W.D.J.Koch
- Vvedenskya Korovin, synonym of Conioselinum in GRIN

=== Tribe Aciphylleae ===
- Aciphylla Forst
- Anisotome Hook
- Gingidia Dawson
- Lignocarpa Dawson
- Scandia Dawson

=== Tribe Annesorhizeae ===
- Annesorhiza Cham. & Schltdl.
- Astydamia DC.
- Chamarea Eckl. & Zeyh.
- Ezosciadium B.L.Burtt
- Itasina Raf.
- Molopospermum W.D.J.Koch

=== Tribe Apieae ===
- Ammi L.
- Anethum L.
- Apium L.
- Apodicarpum Makino
- Billburttia Magee & B.-E.van Wyk
- Deverra DC.
- Foeniculum Mill.
- Naufraga Constance & Cannon
- Petroselinum Hill
- Pseudoridolfia Reduron et al.
- Ridolfia Moris
- Rutheopsis A. Hansen & G. Kunkel (synonym Canaria Jim.Mejías & P.Vargas)
- Sclerosciadium W.D.J.Koch ex DC.
- Stoibrax Raf.
- Visnaga Mill., synonym of Ammi in GRIN

=== Tribe Bupleureae ===
- Bupleurum L.
- Hohenackeria Fisch. & C.A.Mey.

=== Tribe Careae ===
- Aegokeras Raf.
- Aegopodium L.
- Carum L.
- Chamaesciadium C.A.Mey.
- Falcaria Fabr.
- Fuernrohria K.Koch
- Gongylosciadium Rech.f.
- Grammosciadium DC.
- Hladnikia Rchb.
- Kundmannia Scop.
- Oliveria Vent.
- Rhabdosciadium Boiss.
- Selinopsis Coss. & Durieu ex Batt. & Trab.

=== Tribe Chamaesieae ===
- Chamaesium H.Wolff

=== Tribe Choritaenieae ===
- Choritaenia Benth.

=== Tribe Coriandreae ===
- Bifora Hoffm.
- Coriandrum L.
- Sclerotiaria Korovin

=== Tribe Echinophoreae ===
- Anisosciadium DC.
- Dicyclophora Boiss.
- Echinophora L.
- Mediasia Pimenov
- Nirarathamnos Balf.f.
- Pycnocycla Lindl.

=== Tribe Erigenieae ===
- Erigenia Nutt.

=== Tribe Heteromorpheae ===
- Andriana B.-E.van Wyk
- Anginon Raf.
- Anisopoda Baker
- Cannaboides B.-E.van Wyk
- Dracosciadium Hilliard & B.L.Burtt
- Glia Sond.
- Heteromorpha Cham. & Schltdl.
- Oreofraga M.F.Watson & E.L.Barclay, nom. inval.
- Polemannia Eckl. & Zeyh.
- Pseudocannaboides B.-E.van Wyk
- Pseudocarum C. Norman
- Tana B.-E.van Wyk

=== Tribe Komarovieae ===
- Calyptrosciadium Rech.f. & Kuber
- Changium H.Wolff
- Chuanminshen M.L.Sheh & R.H.Shan
- Cyclorhiza M.L.Sheh & R.H.Shan
- Komaroviopsis Doweld, replacement name for Komarovia in PoWO
- Mastigosciadium Rech.f. & Kuber
- Parasilaus Leute
- Pterocyclus Klotzsch
- Sphaerosciadium Pimenov & Kljuykov
- Zhobia A.Sultan, N.Khan, Kljuykov & Lyskov

=== Tribe Lichtensteinieae ===
- Lichtensteinia Cham. & Schltdl.

=== Tribe Marlothielleae ===
- Marlothiella H.Wolff

=== Tribe Oenantheae ===
- Berula W.D.J.Koch
- × Beruladium A.C.Leslie (Berula × Helosciadium)
- Caropsis (Rouy & E. G. Camus) Rauschert
- Cicuta L.
- Cryptotaenia DC.
- Cynosciadium DC.
- Daucosma Engelm. & A.Gray
- Harperella Rose
- Helosciadium W. D. J. Koch
- Lereschia Boiss.
- Lilaeopsis Greene
- Limnosciadium Mathias & Constance
- Neogoezia Hemsl.
- Oenanthe L.
- Oxypolis Raf.
- Perideridia Rchb.
- Ptilimnium Raf.
- Sium L.
- Tiedemannia DC.
- Trepocarpus Nutt. ex DC.
- Trocdaris Raf.

=== Tribe Pimpinelleae ===
- Aphanopleura Boiss.
- Arafoe Pimenov & Lavrova
- Demavendia Pimenov
- Frommia H.Wolff
- Haussknechtia Boiss.
- Nothosmyrnium Miq.
- Opsicarpium Mozaff.
- Parapimpinella Fern.Prieto, Sanna & Arjona
- Phellolophium Baker
- Pimpinella L.
- Psammogeton Edgew.
- Similisinocarum Cauwet & Farille
- Spuriopimpinella (H.Boissieu) Kitag.
- Zeravschania Korovin

=== Tribe Pleurospermeae ===
- Aulacospermum Ledeb.
- Eleutherospermum K.Koch
- Eremodaucus Bunge
- Haplosciadium Hochst.
- Hymenidium Lindl.
- Kamelinia F.O.Khass. & I.I.Malzev
- Korshinskia Lipsky
- Physospermum Cusson
- Pleurospermum Hoffm.
- Pseudotrachydium Kljuykov & Pimenov
- Trachydium Lindl.

=== Tribe Pyramidoptereae ===
- Adenosciadium H. Wolff
- Ammoides Adans.
- Astomaea Rchb.
- Berberocarum Zakharova & Pimenov
- Bunium L.
- Crithmum L.
- Cyclospermum Lag.
- Elaeosticta Fenzl
- Elwendia Boiss.
- Froriepia K.Koch
- Galagania Lipsky
- Gongylotaxis Pimenov & Kljuykov
- Hellenocarum H. Wolff
- Horstrissea Greuter et al.
- Hyalolaena Bunge
- Lagoecia L.
- Lipskya (Koso-Pol.) Nevski
- Microsciadium Boiss.
- Modesciadium P.Vargas & Jim.Mejías
- Mogoltavia Korovin
- Neomuretia Kljuykov, Degtjareva & Zakharova
- Notiosciadium Speg.
- Oedibasis Koso-Pol.
- Oreoschimperella Rauschert
- Ormopterum Schischk.
- Postiella Kljuykov
- Pyramidoptera Boiss.
- Scaligeria DC.
- Schulzia Spreng.
- Schrenkia Fisch. & C.A.Mey.
- Schtschurowskia Regel & Schmalh.
- Sison L.
- Tamamschjanella Pimenov & Kljuykov
- Trachyspermum Link

=== Tribe Scandiceae ===
- Artedia L.
- Cephalopodum Korovin
- Glaucosciadium B.L.Burtt & P.H.Davis

==== Tribe Scandiceae subtribe Daucinae ====
- Ammodaucus Coss. & Durieu
- Cuminum L.
- Daucus L.
- Ekimia H.Duman & M.F.Watson
- Laser Borkh. ex G.Gaertn. et al.
- Laserocarpum Spalik & Wojew.
- Laserpitium L.
- Orlaya Hoffm.
- Portenschlagiella Tutin
- Siler Mill.
- Silphiodaucus (Koso-Pol.) Spalik, Wojew., Banasiak, Piwczyński & Reduron
- Thapsia L.

==== Tribe Scandiceae subtribe Ferulinae ====
- Autumnalia Pimenov
- Fergania Pimenov
- Ferula L.
- Kafirnigania Kamelin & Kinzik.
- Ladyginia Lipsky
- Leutea Pimenov

==== Tribe Scandiceae subtribe Scandicinae ====
- × Anthrichaerophyllum P.Fourn. (Anthriscus × Chaerophyllum)
- Anthriscus Pers.
- Athamanta L.
- Chaerophyllopsis H.Boissieu
- Chaerophyllum L.
- Conopodium W.D.J.Koch
- Geocaryum Coss.
- Kozlovia Lipsky
- Krasnovia Popov ex Schischk. (may be included in Kozlovia)
- Myrrhis Mill.
- Neoconopodium (Koso-Pol.) Pimenov & Kljuykov (may be included in Kozlovia)
- Osmorhiza Raf.
- Scandix L.
- Sphallerocarpus Besser ex DC.
- Todaroa Parl.

==== Tribe Scandiceae subtribe Torilidinae ====
- Astrodaucus Drude
- Caucalis L.
- Chaetosciadium Boiss.
- Lisaea Boiss.
- Szovitsia Fisch. & C.A.Mey.
- Torilis Adans.
- Turgenia Hoffm.
- Turgeniopsis Boiss., synonym of Glochidotheca in GRIN
- Yabea Koso-Pol.

=== Tribe Selineae ===
- Aethusa L.
- Aletes J.M.Coult. & Rose
- Ammoselinum Torr. & A.Gray
- Angelica L.
- Apiastrum Nutt. ex Torr. & A.Gray
- Arcuatopterus M.L.Sheh & R.H.Shan
- Arracacia Bancr.
- Carlesia Dunn
- Chymsydia Albov
- Cnidiocarpa Pimenov
- Cnidium Cusson
- Coaxana J.M.Coult. & Rose
- Cortia DC.
- Cortiella C. Norman
- Cotopaxia Mathias & Constance
- Coulterophytum B.L.Rob.
- Cyathoselinum Benth.
- Cymopterus Raf.
- Dahliaphyllum Constance & Breedlove
- Dichoropetalum Fenzl
- Dimorphosciadium Pimenov
- Donnellsmithia J.M.Coult. & Rose
- Dystaenia Kitag.
- Enantiophylla J.M.Coult. & Rose
- Endressia J. Gay
- Eurytaenia Torr. & A.Gray
- Exoacantha Labill.
- Ferulopsis Kitag.
- Glehnia F.Schmidt ex Miq.
- Haloselinum Pimenov
- Harbouria J.M.Coult. & Rose
- Johrenia DC.
- Kadenia Lavrova & V.N.Tikhom.
- Kailashia Pimenov & Kljuykov
- Karatavia Pimenov & Lavrova
- Kedarnatha P.K.Mukh. & Constance
- Kitagawia Pimenov
- Ledebouriella H.Wolff
- Libanotis Haller ex Zinn
- Ligusticopsis Leute
- Lomatium Raf.
- Lomatocarpa Pimenov
- Magadania Pimenov & Lavrova
- Mathiasella Constance & C.L.Hitchc.
- Melanosciadium H.Boissieu
- Musineon Raf.
- Myrrhidendron J.M.Coult. & Rose
- Neonelsonia J.M.Coult. & Rose
- Neoparrya Mathias
- Niphogeton Schltdl.
- Oligocladus Chodat & Wilczek
- Oreocome Edgew.
- Oreonana Jeps.
- Oreoxis Raf.
- Ostericum Hoffm.
- Ottoa Kunth
- Paraligusticum V.N.Tikhom.
- Perissocoeleum Mathias & Constance
- Peucedanum L.
- Phlojodicarpus Turcz. ex Ledeb.
- Pilopleura Schischk.
- Podistera S.Watson
- Polytaenia DC.
- Prionosciadium S.Watson
- Pseudopeucedanum C.K.Liu & X.J.He
- Rhodosciadium S.Watson
- Sajanella Soják
- Saposhnikovia Schischk.
- Scrithacola Alava
- Selinum L.
- Seseli L.
- Shoshonea Evert & Constance
- Spermolepis Raf.
- Stenocoelium Ledeb.
- Stenotaenia Boiss.
- Taenidia (Torr. & A.Gray) Drude
- Taeniopetalum Vis.
- Tauschia Schltdl.
- Thaspium Nutt.
- Thecocarpus Boiss.
- Trinia Hoffm.
- Vesper R.L.Hartm. & G.L.Nesom
- Vicatia DC.
- Villarrealia G.L.Nesom
- Xanthogalum Avé-Lall.
- Xyloselinum Pimenov & Kljuykov
- Yildirimlia Doğru-Koca
- Zizia W.D.J.Koch

=== Tribe Smyrnieae ===
- Lecokia DC.
- Smyrnium L.

=== Tribe Tordylieae ===
- Afroligusticum C.Norman
- Afrosciadium P.J.D.Winter
- Capnophyllum Gaertn.
- Cymbocarpum DC. ex C.A.Mey.
- Cynorhiza Eckl. & Zeyh.
- Dasispermum Neck. ex Raf.
- Ducrosia Boiss.
- Kalakia Alava
- Lefebvrea A.Rich.
- Nanobubon Magee
- Notobubon B.-E.van Wyk
- Scaraboides Magee & B.-E.van Wyk
- Stenosemis E.Mey. ex Sond.

==== Tribe Tordylieae subtribe Tordyliinae ====
- Heracleum L.
- Kandaharia Alava
- Lalldhwojia Farille
- Leiotulus Ehrenb.
- Ormosciadium Boiss.
- Pastinaca L.
- Pastinacopsis Golosk.
- Pinda P. K. Mukh. & Constance
- Semenovia Regel & Herder
- Symphyoloma C. A.Mey.
- Tetrataenium (DC.) Manden.
- Tordyliopsis DC.
- Tordylium L.
- Trigonosciadium Boiss.
- Vanasushava P.K.Mukh. & Constance
- Zosima Hoffm.

== Subfamily Azorelloideae ==
- Asteriscium Cham. & Schltdl.
- Azorella Lam.
- Bolax Comm. ex Juss.
- Bowlesia Ruiz & Pav.
- Dichosciadium Domin
- Dickinsia Franch.
- Diplaspis Hook. f.
- Diposis DC.
- Domeykoa Phil.
- Drusa DC.
- Eremocharis Phil.
- Gymnophyton Clos
- Homalocarpus Hook. & Arn.
- Oschatzia Walp.
- Pozoa Lag.
- Spananthe Jacq.

== Subfamily Mackinlayoideae ==
- Actinotus Labill.
- Apiopetalum Baill.
- Centella L.
- Chlaenosciadium C. Norman
- Homalosciadium Domin
- Mackinlaya F. Muell.
- Micropleura Lag.
- Pentapeltis (Endl.) Bunge
- Schoenolaena Bunge
- Xanthosia Rudge

== Subfamily Saniculoideae ==
The NCBI Taxonomy Browser lists the tribes Saniculeae and Steganotaenieae in a separate subfamily, Saniculoideae. A 2021 molecular phylogenetic study supported the monophyly of the subfamily.

- Phlyctidocarpa Cannon & W.L.Theob. may be placed in an expanded subfamily Saniculoideae.

=== Tribe Saniculeae ===
- Actinolema Fenzl
- Alepidea F.Delaroche
- Arctopus L.
- Astrantia L.
- Eryngium Tourn. ex L.
- Petagnaea Caruel
- Sanicula L.

=== Tribe Steganotaenieae ===
- Polemanniopsis B.L.Burtt
- Steganotaenia Hochst.
