= Sillaphyton =

Scientific classification
- Kingdom: Plantae
- Clade: Tracheophytes
- Clade: Angiosperms
- Clade: Eudicots
- Clade: Asterids
- Order: Apiales
- Family: Apiaceae
- Subfamily: Apioideae
- Tribe: Selineae
- Genus: Sillaphyton; Pimenov
- Species: S. podagraria

Binomial name
- Sillaphyton podagraria (H.Boissieu) Pimenov

Synonyms
- Peucedanum podagraria H.Boissieu

Genus of flowering plants

Sillaphyton is a monotypic genus of flowering plants belonging to the family Apiaceae. Its only species is Sillaphyton podagraria, native to Korea.
