= Oreocomoides =

Scientific classification
- Kingdom: Plantae
- Clade: Tracheophytes
- Clade: Angiosperms
- Clade: Eudicots
- Clade: Asterids
- Order: Apiales
- Family: Apiaceae
- Subfamily: Apioideae
- Tribe: Scandiceae
- Genus: Oreocomoides; Kljuykov
- Species: O. stelliphora

Binomial name
- Oreocomoides stelliphora (Cauwet & Farille) Kljuykov

Synonyms
- Oreocome stelliphora Cauwet & Farille (1985) (basionym); Oreocomopsis stelliphora (Cauwet & Farille) Pimenov & Kljuykov; Selinum stelliphorum (Cauwet & Farille) Karthik. & Moorthy

Genus of flowering plants

Oreocomoides is a genus of flowering plants in the family Apiaceae. It includes a single species, Oreocomoides stelliphora, a perennial native to subalpine areas of the west-central and central Himalayas.
