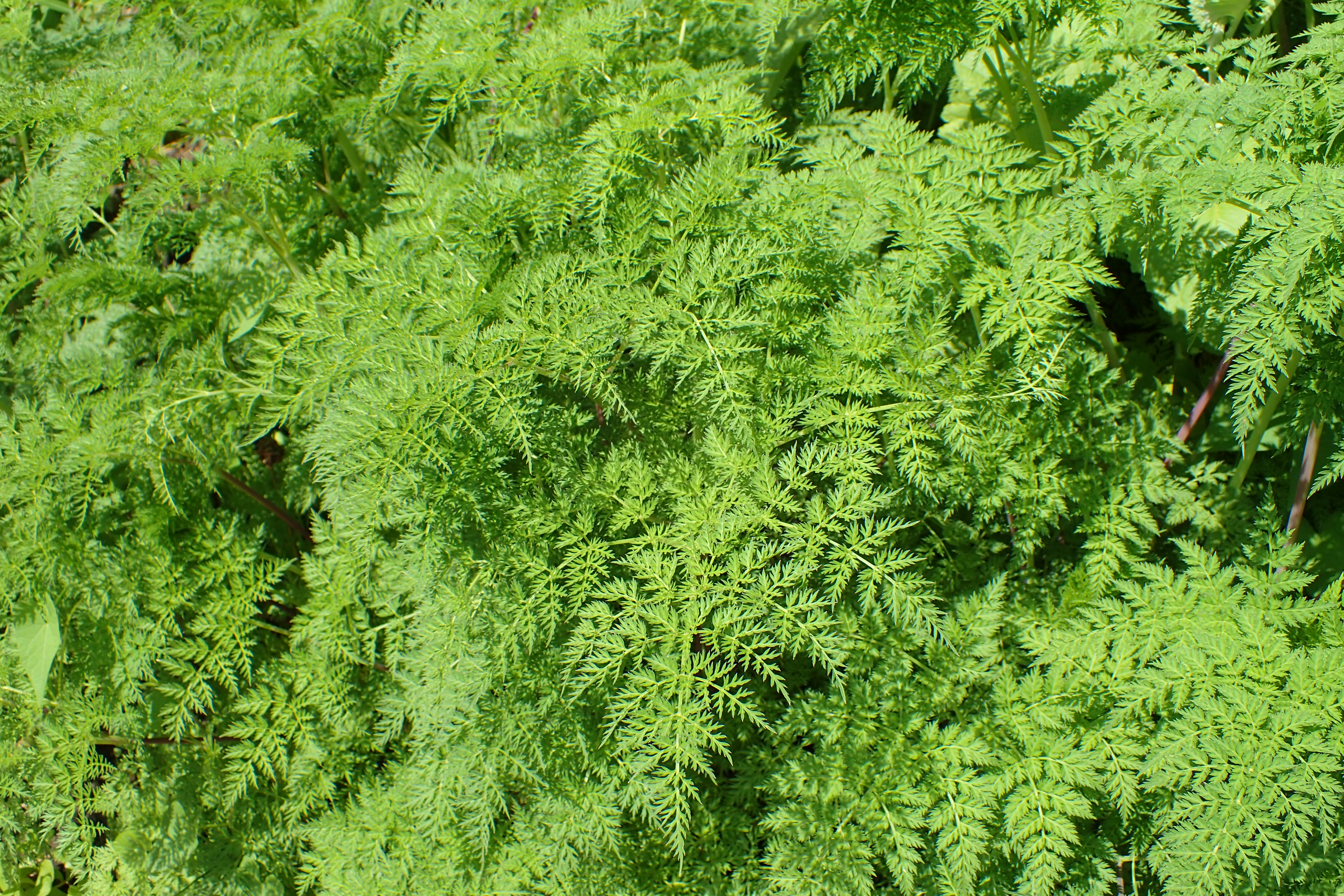
- Cortia wallichiana in the Botanischer Garten, Berlin

Scientific classification
- Kingdom: Plantae
- Clade: Tracheophytes
- Clade: Angiosperms
- Clade: Eudicots
- Clade: Asterids
- Order: Apiales
- Family: Apiaceae
- Subfamily: Apioideae
- Tribe: Selineae
- Genus: Cortia; DC.

= Cortia =

Genus of flowering plants

Cortia is a genus of flowering plants belonging to the family Apiaceae.

Its native range is Himalaya to Tibet.

Species:

- Cortia candollei (DC.) Leute
- Cortia depressa (D.Don) C.Norman
- Cortia lhasana (H.T.Chang & R.H.Shan) Pimenov & Kljuykov
- Cortia staintoniana Farille & S.B.Malla
