= Ekimia =

Scientific classification
- Kingdom: Plantae
- Clade: Tracheophytes
- Clade: Angiosperms
- Clade: Eudicots
- Clade: Asterids
- Order: Apiales
- Family: Apiaceae
- Subfamily: Apioideae
- Tribe: Scandiceae
- Subtribe: Daucinae
- Genus: Ekimia; H.Duman & M.F.Watson

Species
- 4; see text

Genus of flowering plants

Ekimia is a genus of flowering plants in the family Apiaceae. It includes four species native to Turkey, Lebanon, and Syria in western Asia.

== Species ==
Four species are accepted.

- Ekimia bornmuelleri (Hub.-Mor. & Reese) H.Duman & M.F.Watson – southwestern Turkey
- Ekimia glauca (Post) Banasiak, Baczyński & Spalik – Syria and southern Turkey
- Ekimia ozcan-secmenii Şenol & Eroğlu – Turkey
- Ekimia petrophila (Boiss. & Heldr.) Baczyński, Banasiak & Spalik – southern Turkey
