= Pycnocycla =

Scientific classification
- Kingdom: Plantae
- Clade: Tracheophytes
- Clade: Angiosperms
- Clade: Eudicots
- Clade: Asterids
- Order: Apiales
- Family: Apiaceae
- Subfamily: Apioideae
- Tribe: Echinophoreae
- Genus: Pycnocycla; Lindl.

Genus of plants

Pycnocycla is a genus of flowering plants belonging to the family Apiaceae.

Its native range is Western Tropical Africa to India.

Species:

- Pycnocycla acanthorhipsis Rech.f., Aellen & Esfand.
- Pycnocycla aucheriana Decne. ex Boiss.
- Pycnocycla bashagardiana Mozaff.
- Pycnocycla cephalantha Rech.f. & Riedl
- Pycnocycla cespitosa Boiss. & Hausskn.
- Pycnocycla flabellifolia (Boiss.) Boiss.
- Pycnocycla glauca Lindl.
- Pycnocycla ledermannii H.Wolff
- Pycnocycla musiformis Hedge & Lamond
- Pycnocycla nodiflora Decne. ex Boiss.
- Pycnocycla prostrata Hedge & Lamond
- Pycnocycla saxatilis Danin, Hedge & Lamond
- Pycnocycla sheilae Chaudhary
- Pycnocycla spinosa Decne.
- Pycnocycla tomentosa Decne.
