= Autumnalia =

Scientific classification
- Kingdom: Plantae
- Clade: Tracheophytes
- Clade: Angiosperms
- Clade: Eudicots
- Clade: Asterids
- Order: Apiales
- Family: Apiaceae
- Subfamily: Apioideae
- Tribe: Scandiceae
- Subtribe: Ferulinae
- Genus: Autumnalia; Pimenov

Species
- See text.

Genus of plants

Autumnalia is a genus of flowering plants in the family Apiaceae. It is endemic to Uzbekistan.

== Species ==
As of December 2022, Plants of the World Online accepted two species:

- Autumnalia botschantzevii Pimenov
- Autumnalia innopinata Pimenov
