= Cnidiocarpa =

Scientific classification
- Kingdom: Plantae
- Clade: Tracheophytes
- Clade: Angiosperms
- Clade: Eudicots
- Clade: Asterids
- Order: Apiales
- Family: Apiaceae
- Subfamily: Apioideae
- Tribe: Selineae
- Genus: Cnidiocarpa; Pimenov

Species
- Cnidiocarpa alaica Pimenov; Cnidiocarpa grossheimii (Manden.) Pimenov

Genus of flowering plants

Cnidiocarpa is a genus of flowering plant in the family Apiaceae, native to the Caucasus and Central Asia. It has two species.
