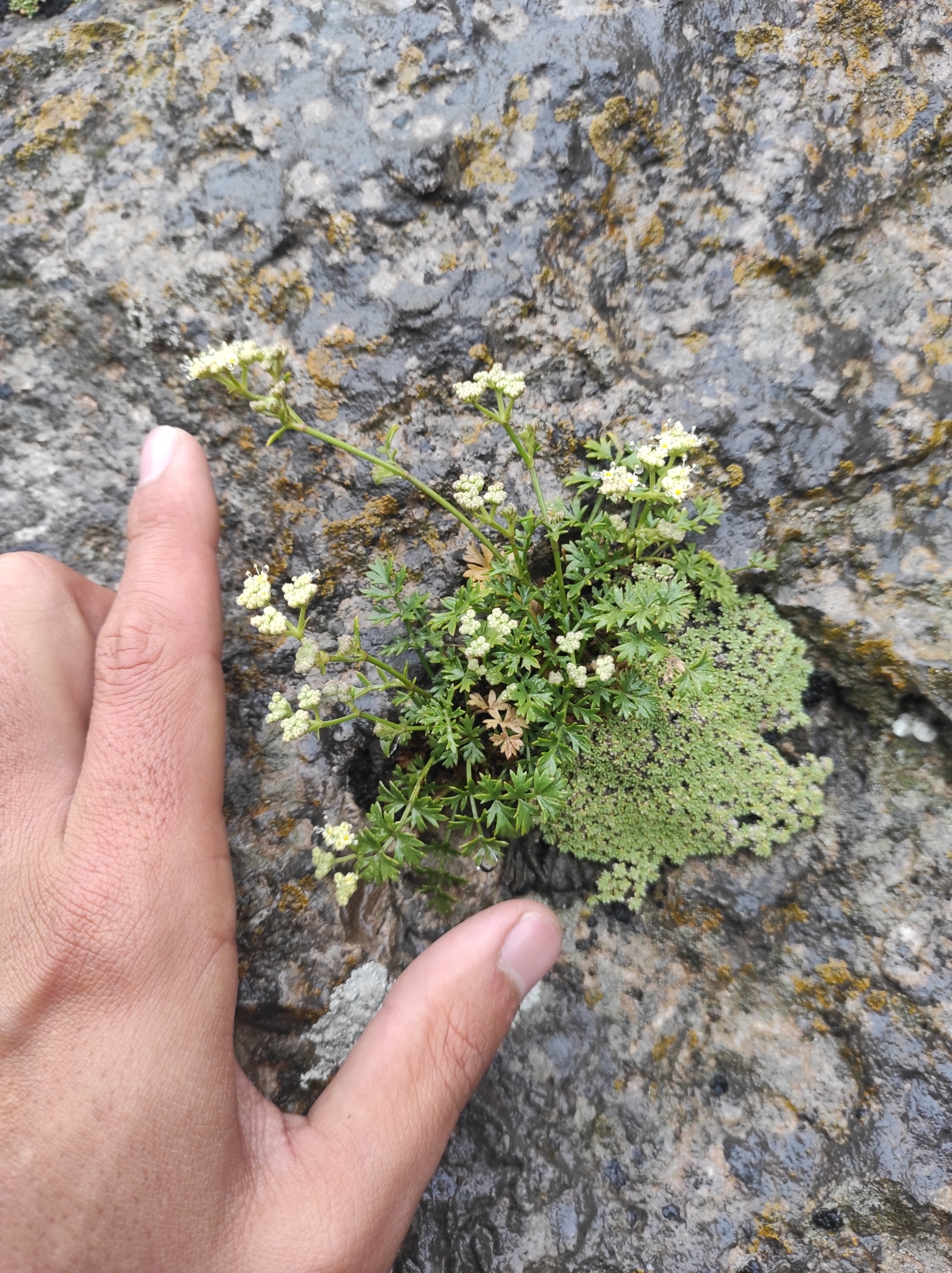
- Shomalia olivieri

Scientific classification
- Kingdom: Plantae
- Clade: Tracheophytes
- Clade: Angiosperms
- Clade: Eudicots
- Clade: Asterids
- Order: Apiales
- Family: Apiaceae
- Subfamily: Apioideae
- Genus: Shomalia; Lyskov

Species
- Shomalia ghafooriana (Akhani) Lyskov; Shomalia olivieri (Boiss.) Lyskov

= Shomalia =

Genus of flowering plants

Shomalia is a genus of flowering plants in the family Apiaceae. It includes two species endemic to Iran.

- Shomalia ghafooriana (Akhani) Lyskov
- Shomalia olivieri (Boiss.) Lyskov
