= Lithosciadium =

Scientific classification
- Kingdom: Plantae
- Clade: Tracheophytes
- Clade: Angiosperms
- Clade: Eudicots
- Clade: Asterids
- Order: Apiales
- Family: Apiaceae
- Subfamily: Apioideae
- Genus: Lithosciadium; Turcz.

Genus of plants

Lithosciadium is a genus of flowering plants belonging to the family Apiaceae.

Its native range extends from Siberia to Mongolia.

Species include:

- Lithosciadium kamelinii (V.M.Vinogr.) Pimenov ex Gubanov
- Lithosciadium multicaule Turcz.
