= Trepocarpus =

Scientific classification
- Kingdom: Plantae
- Clade: Tracheophytes
- Clade: Angiosperms
- Clade: Eudicots
- Clade: Asterids
- Order: Apiales
- Family: Apiaceae
- Subfamily: Apioideae
- Tribe: Oenantheae
- Genus: Trepocarpus; Nutt. ex DC.

Genus of flowering plants

Trepocarpus is a genus of flowering plants belonging to the family Apiaceae.

Its native range is Central and Southeastern USA.

Species:

- Trepocarpus aethusae Nutt. ex DC.
