= Trachydium =

Scientific classification
- Kingdom: Plantae
- Clade: Tracheophytes
- Clade: Angiosperms
- Clade: Eudicots
- Clade: Asterids
- Order: Apiales
- Family: Apiaceae
- Subfamily: Apioideae
- Tribe: Pleurospermeae
- Genus: Trachydium; Lindl.

Genus of flowering plants

Trachydium is a genus of flowering plants belonging to the family Apiaceae.

Its native range is Afghanistan to Southern Central China and Indo-China.

Species:

- Trachydium cambodgianum (H.Boissieu) M.Hiroe
- Trachydium involucellatum R.H.Shan & F.T.Pu
