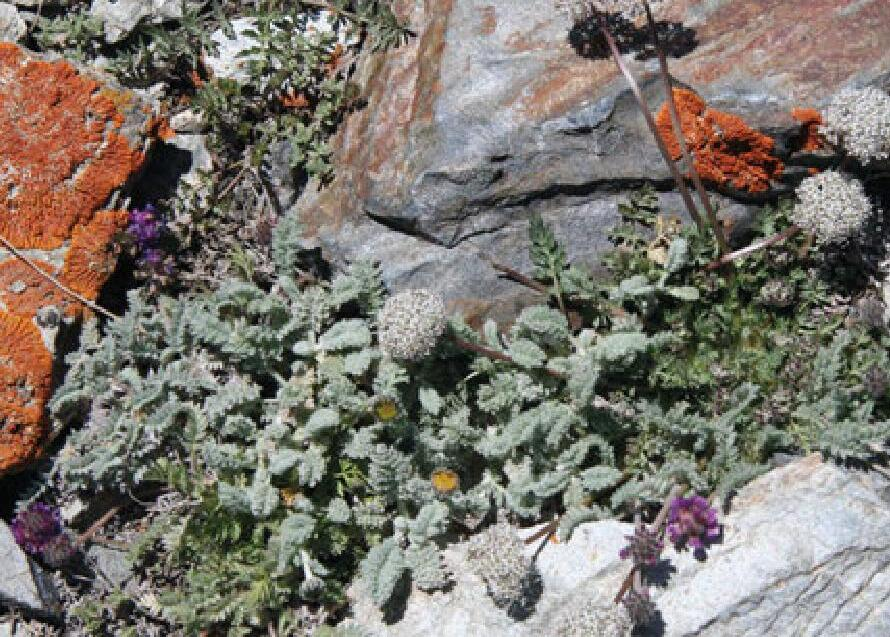
- Lomatocarpa albomarginata

Scientific classification
- Kingdom: Plantae
- Clade: Tracheophytes
- Clade: Angiosperms
- Clade: Eudicots
- Clade: Asterids
- Order: Apiales
- Family: Apiaceae
- Subfamily: Apioideae
- Genus: Lomatocarpa; Pimenov

= Lomatocarpa =

Genus of plants

Lomatocarpa is a genus of flowering plants belonging to the family Apiaceae.

Its native range is Afghanistan to Central Asia and Pakistan.

Species:

- Lomatocarpa albomarginata (Schrenk) Pimenov & Lavrova
- Lomatocarpa multivittata Pimenov & Kljuykov
- Lomatocarpa steineri (Podlech) Pimenov
