= Seselopsis =

Scientific classification
- Kingdom: Plantae
- Clade: Tracheophytes
- Clade: Angiosperms
- Clade: Eudicots
- Clade: Asterids
- Order: Apiales
- Family: Apiaceae
- Subfamily: Apioideae
- Genus: Seselopsis; Schischk.

Genus of plants

Seselopsis is a genus of flowering plants belonging to the family Apiaceae.

Its native range is Central Asia to Xinjiang.

Species:

- Seselopsis pusilla Pimenov & Lavrova
- Seselopsis tianschanica Schischk.
