= Pyramidoptera =

Scientific classification
- Kingdom: Plantae
- Clade: Tracheophytes
- Clade: Angiosperms
- Clade: Eudicots
- Clade: Asterids
- Order: Apiales
- Family: Apiaceae
- Subfamily: Apioideae
- Tribe: Pyramidoptereae
- Genus: Pyramidoptera; Boiss.
- Species: P. cabulica

Binomial name
- Pyramidoptera cabulica Boiss.

Genus of plants

Pyramidoptera is a genus of flowering plants belonging to the family Apiaceae. Its only species is Pyramidoptera cabulica. Its native range is Afghanistan.
