= Changium =

Scientific classification
- Kingdom: Plantae
- Clade: Tracheophytes
- Clade: Angiosperms
- Clade: Eudicots
- Clade: Asterids
- Order: Apiales
- Family: Apiaceae
- Subfamily: Apioideae
- Tribe: Komarovieae
- Genus: Changium; H.Wolff
- Species: C. smyrnioides

Binomial name
- Changium smyrnioides H.Wolff

Genus of flowering plants

Changium smyrnioides is a species of flowering plant in the Apiaceae, of the monotypic genus Changium. It is endemic to the Yangtze basin of China.
