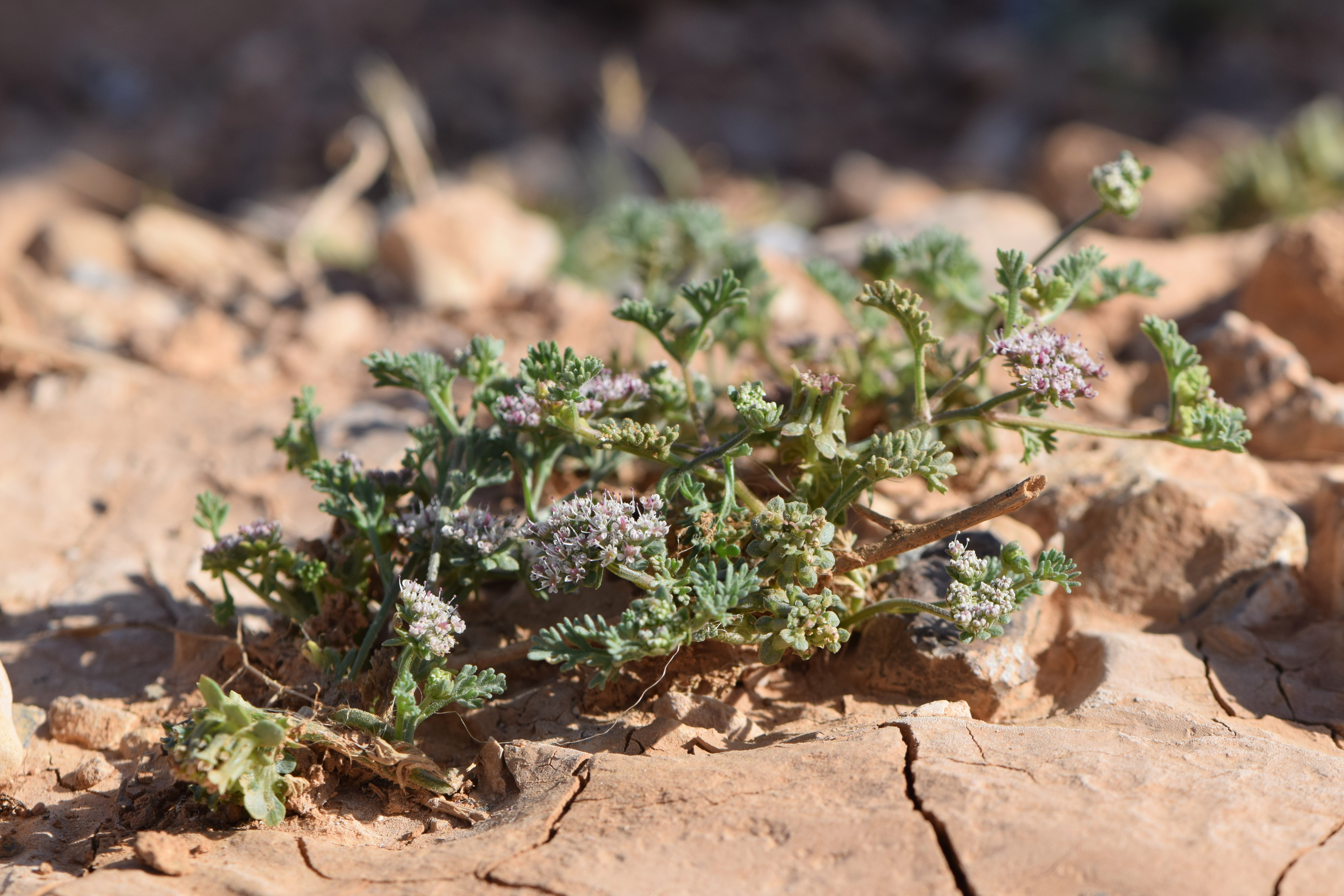
- Anisosciadium isosciadium

Scientific classification
- Kingdom: Plantae
- Clade: Tracheophytes
- Clade: Angiosperms
- Clade: Eudicots
- Clade: Asterids
- Order: Apiales
- Family: Apiaceae
- Subfamily: Apioideae
- Tribe: Echinophoreae
- Genus: Anisosciadium; DC.

Species
- Anisosciadium isosciadium; Anisosciadium lanatum; Anisosciadium orientale; Anisosciadium tenuifolium

= Anisosciadium =

Genus of flowering plants

Anisosciadium is a genus of flowering plant in the family Apiaceae, with 3 species. It is endemic to Southwest Asia.
