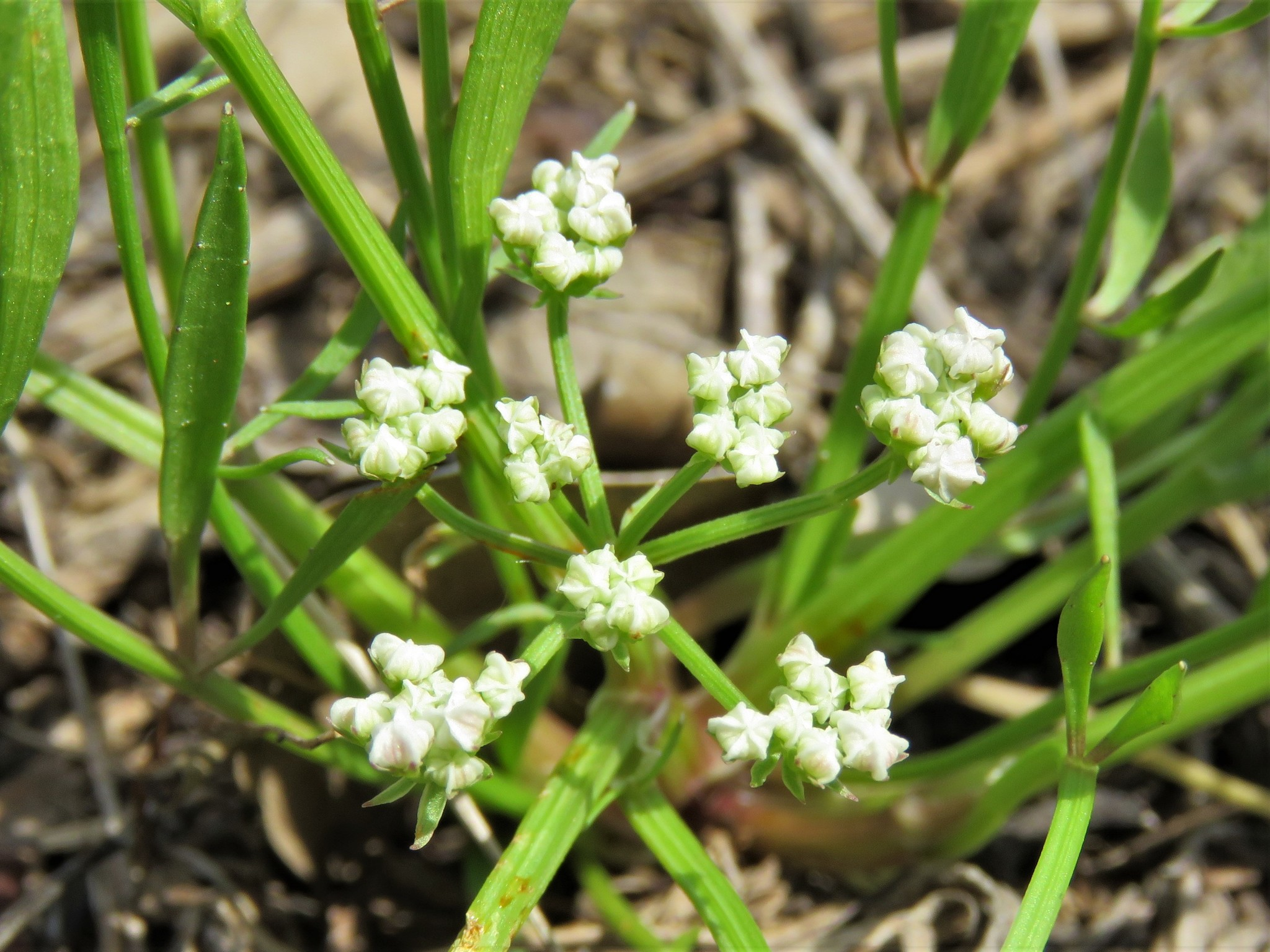
- Limnosciadium pumilum

Scientific classification
- Kingdom: Plantae
- Clade: Tracheophytes
- Clade: Angiosperms
- Clade: Eudicots
- Clade: Asterids
- Order: Apiales
- Family: Apiaceae
- Subfamily: Apioideae
- Tribe: Oenantheae
- Genus: Limnosciadium; Mathias & Constance

= Limnosciadium =

Genus of plants

Limnosciadium is a genus of flowering plants belonging to the family Apiaceae.

Its native range is Central USA to Alabama.

Species:

- Limnosciadium pinnatum (DC.) Mathias & Constance
- Limnosciadium pumilum (Engelm. & A.Gray) Mathias & Constance
