= Pseudoridolfia =

Scientific classification
- Kingdom: Plantae
- Clade: Tracheophytes
- Clade: Angiosperms
- Clade: Eudicots
- Clade: Asterids
- Order: Apiales
- Family: Apiaceae
- Subfamily: Apioideae
- Tribe: Apieae
- Genus: Pseudoridolfia; Reduron, Mathez & S.R.Downie

Genus of plants

Pseudoridolfia is a genus of flowering plants belonging to the family Apiaceae.

Its native range is Morocco.

Species:

- Pseudoridolfia fennanei Reduron, Mathez & S.R.Downie
