= Oreocomopsis =

Scientific classification
- Kingdom: Plantae
- Clade: Tracheophytes
- Clade: Angiosperms
- Clade: Eudicots
- Clade: Asterids
- Order: Apiales
- Family: Apiaceae
- Subfamily: Apioideae
- Genus: Oreocomopsis; Pimenov & Kljuykov

Species
- 3; see text

Genus of flowering plants

Oreocomopsis is a genus of flowering plants in the family Apiaceae. It includes three species native to south-central China (Sichuan and Yunnan) and Tibet.

- Oreocomopsis aromatica (W.W.Sm.) Pimenov & Kljuykov – eastern Tibet, southwestern Sichuan, and northwestern Yunnan
- Oreocomopsis dochenensis (W.W.Sm.) Pimenov & Kljuykov – southern Tibet
- Oreocomopsis longiinvolucellata (C.Y.Wu & F.T.Pu) Kljuykov – western Yunnan
