= Chamaesium =

Scientific classification
- Kingdom: Plantae
- Clade: Tracheophytes
- Clade: Angiosperms
- Clade: Eudicots
- Clade: Asterids
- Order: Apiales
- Family: Apiaceae
- Subfamily: Apioideae
- Tribe: Chamaesieae; J.Zhoud & F.D.Pu
- Genus: Chamaesium; H.Wolff (1925)

Species
- 10; see text

Synonyms
- Dolpojestella Farille & Lachard (2002)

Genus of flowering plants

Chamaesium is a genus of flowering plant in the family Apiaceae. It contains ten species native to the Himalayas and central China.

== Species ==
10 species are accepted.

- Chamaesium delavayi (Franch.) R.H.Shan & S.L.Liou
- Chamaesium jiulongense X.L.Guo & X.J.He
- Chamaesium mallaeanum Farille & S.B.Malla
- Chamaesium novem-jugum (C.B.Clarke) C.Norman
- Chamaesium paradoxum H.Wolff
- Chamaesium shrestaeanum Farille & S.B.Malla
- Chamaesium spatuliferum (W.W.Sm.) C.Norman
- Chamaesium thalictrifolium H.Wolff
- Chamaesium viridiflorum (Franch.) H.Wolff ex R.H.Shan
- Chamaesium wolffianum Fedde ex H.Wolff
