= Opsicarpium =

Scientific classification
- Kingdom: Plantae
- Clade: Tracheophytes
- Clade: Angiosperms
- Clade: Eudicots
- Clade: Asterids
- Order: Apiales
- Family: Apiaceae
- Subfamily: Apioideae
- Tribe: Pimpinelleae
- Genus: Opsicarpium; Mozaff.
- Species: O. insignis

Binomial name
- Opsicarpium insignis Mozaff.

Genus of plants

Opsicarpium is a genus of flowering plants belonging to the family Apiaceae. It has only one species, Opsicarpium insignis. Its native range is Iran.
