= Neomuretia =

Scientific classification
- Kingdom: Plantae
- Clade: Tracheophytes
- Clade: Angiosperms
- Clade: Eudicots
- Clade: Asterids
- Order: Apiales
- Family: Apiaceae
- Subfamily: Apioideae
- Tribe: Pyramidoptereae
- Genus: Neomuretia; Kljuykov, Degtjareva & Zakharova

Species
- Neomuretia amplifolia (Boiss. & Hausskn.) Kljuykov, Degtjareva & Zakharova; Neomuretia pisidica (Kit Tan) Kljuykov, Degtjareva & Zakharova

Genus of flowering plants

Neomuretia is a genus of flowering plants in the family Apiaceae. It includes two species native to Western Asia, ranging from Turkey to Iraq and Iran.

- Neomuretia amplifolia (Boiss. & Hausskn.) Kljuykov, Degtjareva & Zakharova – northern and northeastern Iraq and northwestern Iran
- Neomuretia pisidica (Kit Tan) Kljuykov, Degtjareva & Zakharova – Turkey
