= Grammosciadium =

Scientific classification
- Kingdom: Plantae
- Clade: Tracheophytes
- Clade: Angiosperms
- Clade: Eudicots
- Clade: Asterids
- Order: Apiales
- Family: Apiaceae
- Subfamily: Apioideae
- Tribe: Careae
- Genus: Grammosciadium; DC.

Genus of plants

Grammosciadium is a genus of flowering plants belonging to the family Apiaceae.

Its native range is Turkey to Iran.

Species:

- Grammosciadium cornutum (Nábelek) C.C.Towns.
- Grammosciadium daucoides DC.
- Grammosciadium macrodon Boiss.
- Grammosciadium scabridum Boiss.
