= Tana bojeriana =

Scientific classification
- Kingdom: Plantae
- Clade: Tracheophytes
- Clade: Angiosperms
- Clade: Eudicots
- Clade: Asterids
- Order: Apiales
- Family: Apiaceae
- Subfamily: Apioideae
- Tribe: Heteromorpheae
- Genus: Tana; B.-E.van Wyk
- Species: T. bojeriana

Binomial name
- Tana bojeriana (Baker) B.-E.van Wyk

Synonyms
- Heteromorpha bojeriana (Baker) Humbert; Peucedanum bojerianum Baker

Genus of plants

Tana bojeriana is a species of flowering plant in the family Apiaceae, endemic to Madagascar. It is the only species in the monotypic genus Tana. The genus was first described in 1999, and the species was first described by John Gilbert Baker in 1890 as Peucedanum bojerianum.
