= Similisinocarum =

Scientific classification
- Kingdom: Plantae
- Clade: Tracheophytes
- Clade: Angiosperms
- Clade: Eudicots
- Clade: Asterids
- Order: Apiales
- Family: Apiaceae
- Subfamily: Apioideae
- Tribe: Pimpinelleae
- Genus: Similisinocarum; Cauwet & Farille

Species
- Similisinocarum normanianum Cauwet & Farille; Similisinocarum pimpinellisimulacrum Farille & S.B.Malla

Genus of flowering plants

Similisinocarum is a genus of flowering plants in the family Apiaceae. It includes two species native to Nepal, Sikkim, and Tibet.

- Similisinocarum normanianum Cauwet & Farille – Nepal, Sikkim, and southern Tibet
- Similisinocarum pimpinellisimulacrum Farille & S.B.Malla – Nepal and southern Tibet
