= Andriana (plant) =

Scientific classification
- Kingdom: Plantae
- Clade: Tracheophytes
- Clade: Angiosperms
- Clade: Eudicots
- Clade: Asterids
- Order: Apiales
- Family: Apiaceae
- Subfamily: Apioideae
- Tribe: Heteromorpheae
- Genus: Andriana; B.-E.van Wyk

Species
- See text.

Genus of plants

Andriana is a genus of flowering plant in the family Apiaceae, endemic to Madagascar. The genus was first described in 1999.

== Species ==
As of December 2022, Plants of the World Online accepted the following species:

- Andriana coursii (Humbert) B.-E.van Wyk
- Andriana marojejyensis (Humbert) B.-E.van Wyk
- Andriana tsaratananensis (Humbert) B.-E.van Wyk
