= Rhizomatophora =

Scientific classification
- Kingdom: Plantae
- Clade: Tracheophytes
- Clade: Angiosperms
- Clade: Eudicots
- Clade: Asterids
- Order: Apiales
- Family: Apiaceae
- Subfamily: Apioideae
- Tribe: Selineae
- Genus: Rhizomatophora; Pimenov
- Species: R. aegopodioides

Binomial name
- Rhizomatophora aegopodioides (Boiss.) Pimenov

Synonyms
- Aegopodium involucratum Orph. ex Boiss.; Peucedanum aegopodioides (Boiss.) Vandas; Peucedanum aegopoides Formánek; Peucedanum serbicum Petrov; Physospermum aegopodioides Boiss. (1872) (basionym)

Genus of flowering plants

Rhizomatophora is a genus of flowering plants in the family Apiaceae. It contains a single species, Rhizomatophora aegopodioides, a perennial native to southern Italy, the Balkan Peninsula, northern Turkey, and the western Caucasus.
