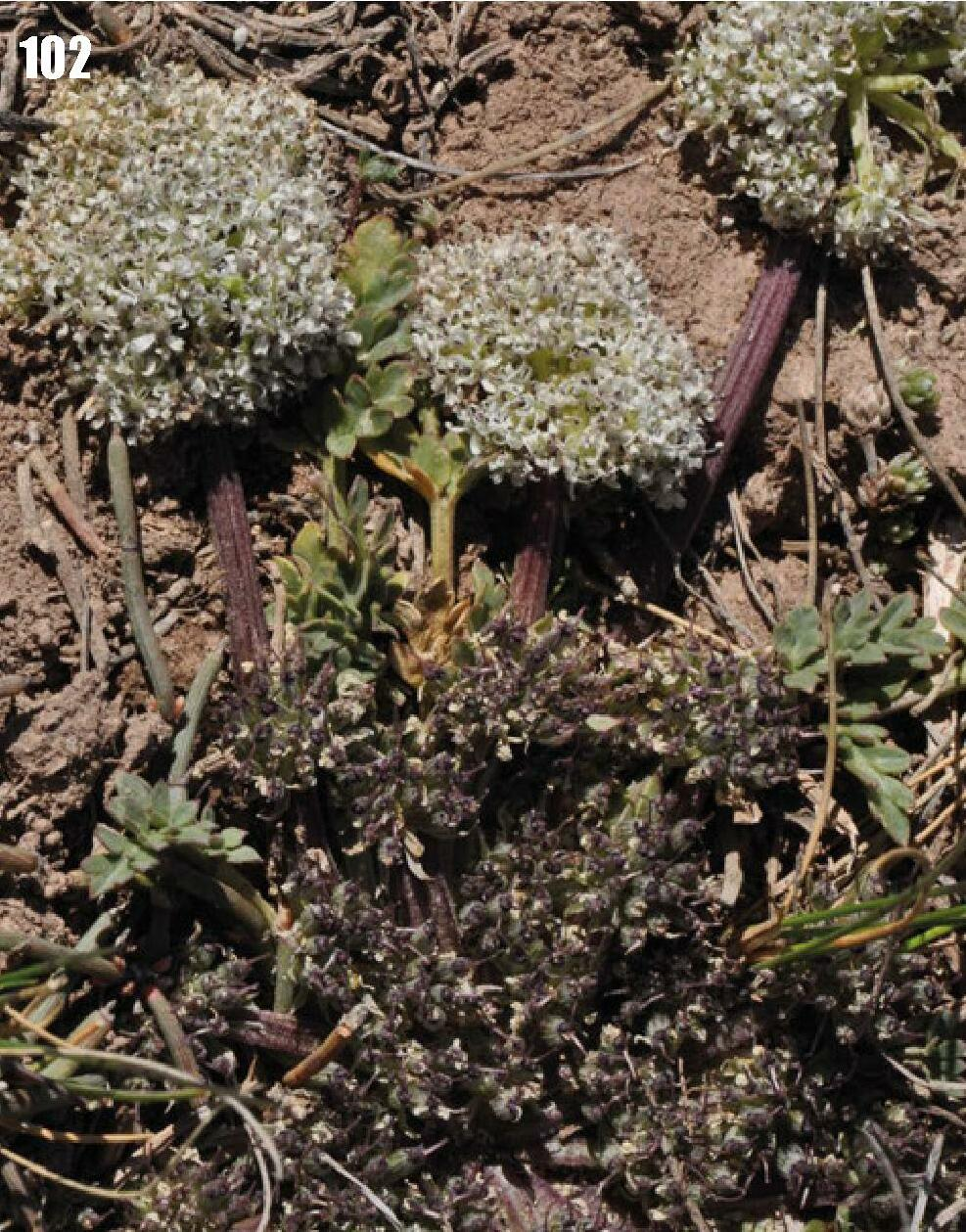
- Dimorphosciadium gayoides

Scientific classification
- Kingdom: Plantae
- Clade: Tracheophytes
- Clade: Angiosperms
- Clade: Eudicots
- Clade: Asterids
- Order: Apiales
- Family: Apiaceae
- Subfamily: Apioideae
- Tribe: Selineae
- Genus: Dimorphosciadium; Pimenov

= Dimorphosciadium =

Genus of plants

Dimorphosciadium is a genus of flowering plants belonging to the family Apiaceae.

Its native range is Central Asia to Xinjiang.

Species:

- Dimorphosciadium gayoides (Regel & Schmalh.) Pimenov
- Dimorphosciadium shenii Pimenov & Kljuykov
