= Sphaenolobium =

Scientific classification
- Kingdom: Plantae
- Clade: Tracheophytes
- Clade: Angiosperms
- Clade: Eudicots
- Clade: Asterids
- Order: Apiales
- Family: Apiaceae
- Subfamily: Apioideae
- Genus: Sphaenolobium; Pimenov

Genus of plants

Sphaenolobium is a genus of flowering plants belonging to the family Apiaceae.

Its native range is Central Asia.

Species:

- Sphaenolobium korovinii Pimenov & Kljuykov
- Sphaenolobium tenuisectum (Korovin) Pimenov
- Sphaenolobium tianschanicum (Korovin) Pimenov
