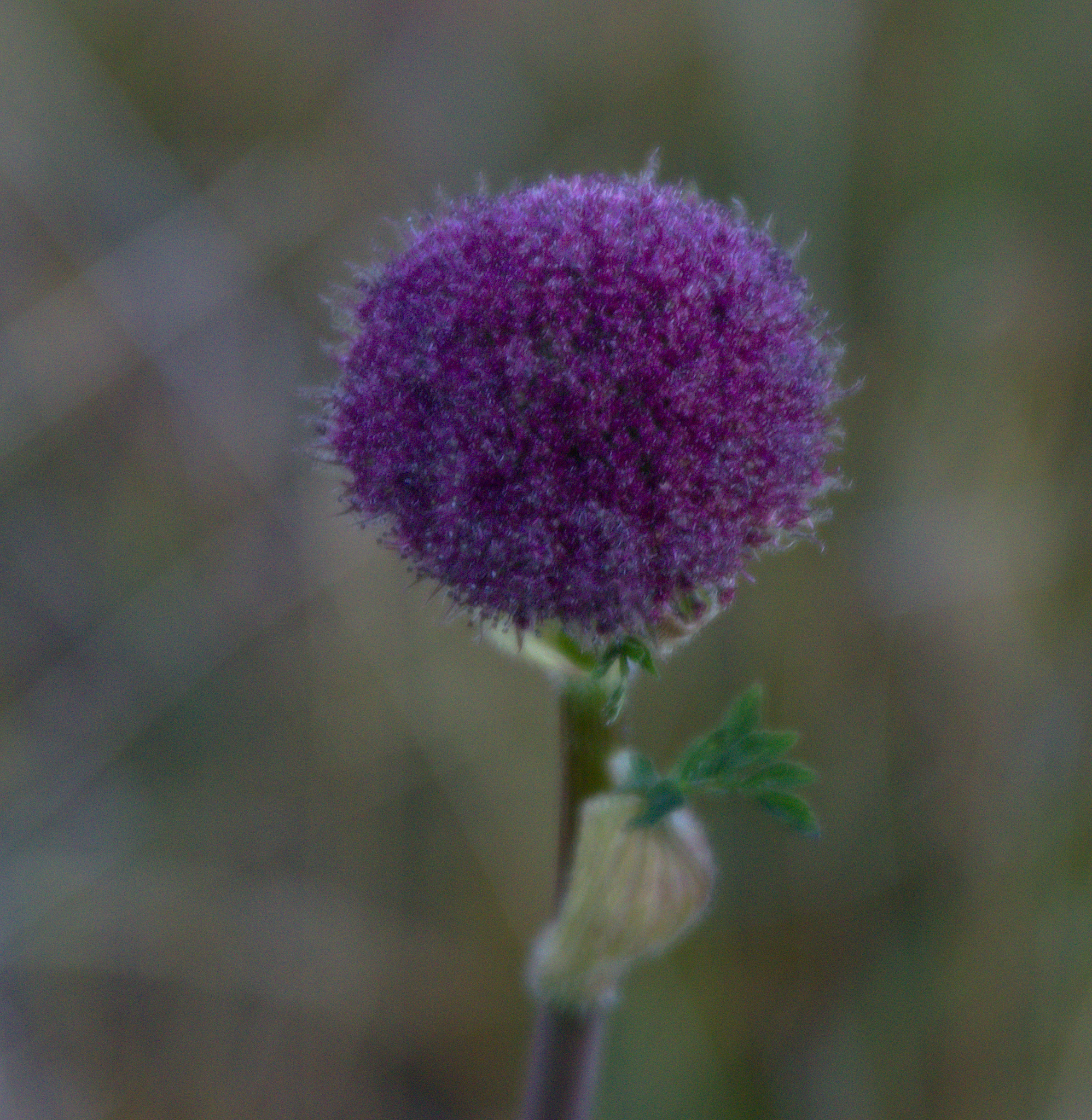
- Sajanella monstrosa

Scientific classification
- Kingdom: Plantae
- Clade: Tracheophytes
- Clade: Angiosperms
- Clade: Eudicots
- Clade: Asterids
- Order: Apiales
- Family: Apiaceae
- Subfamily: Apioideae
- Tribe: Selineae
- Genus: Sajanella; Soják
- Species: S. monstrosa

Binomial name
- Sajanella monstrosa (Stephan ex Schult.) Soják

Synonyms
- Genus: Sajania Pimenov, nom. illeg.; Species: Athamanta monstrosa Stephan ex Schult.; Sajania monstrosa (Stephan ex Schult.) Pimenov; Schulzia monstrosa (Stephan ex Schult.) M.Hiroe; Seseli monstrosum (Stephan ex Schult.) Koso-Pol.; Athamanta compacta Ledeb.; Ligusticum athamanthicum Adams ex DC.; Schulzia compacta Ledeb.

= Sajanella =

Monotypic genus of plants

Sajanella is a monotypic genus of flowering plants belonging to the family Apiaceae. Its only species is Sajanella monstrosa, native from Central Asia to Siberia and Mongolia.
