= Selinopsis =

Scientific classification
- Kingdom: Plantae
- Clade: Tracheophytes
- Clade: Angiosperms
- Clade: Eudicots
- Clade: Asterids
- Order: Apiales
- Family: Apiaceae
- Subfamily: Apioideae
- Tribe: Careae
- Genus: Selinopsis; Coss. & Durieu ex Batt.

Genus of plants

Selinopsis is a genus of flowering plants belonging to the family Apiaceae.

Its native range is Northwestern Africa.

Species:

- Selinopsis foetida Coss. & Durieu ex Batt.
- Selinopsis montana Coss. & Durieu ex Batt.
