= Pseudocarum =

Scientific classification
- Kingdom: Plantae
- Clade: Tracheophytes
- Clade: Angiosperms
- Clade: Eudicots
- Clade: Asterids
- Order: Apiales
- Family: Apiaceae
- Subfamily: Apioideae
- Tribe: Heteromorpheae
- Genus: Pseudocarum; C.Norman

Genus of plants

Pseudocarum is a genus of flowering plants belonging to the family Apiaceae.

Its native range is Ethiopia to Eastern Tropical Africa, Madagascar.

Species:

- Pseudocarum eminii (Engl.) H.Wolff
- Pseudocarum laxiflorum (Baker) B.-E.van Wyk
