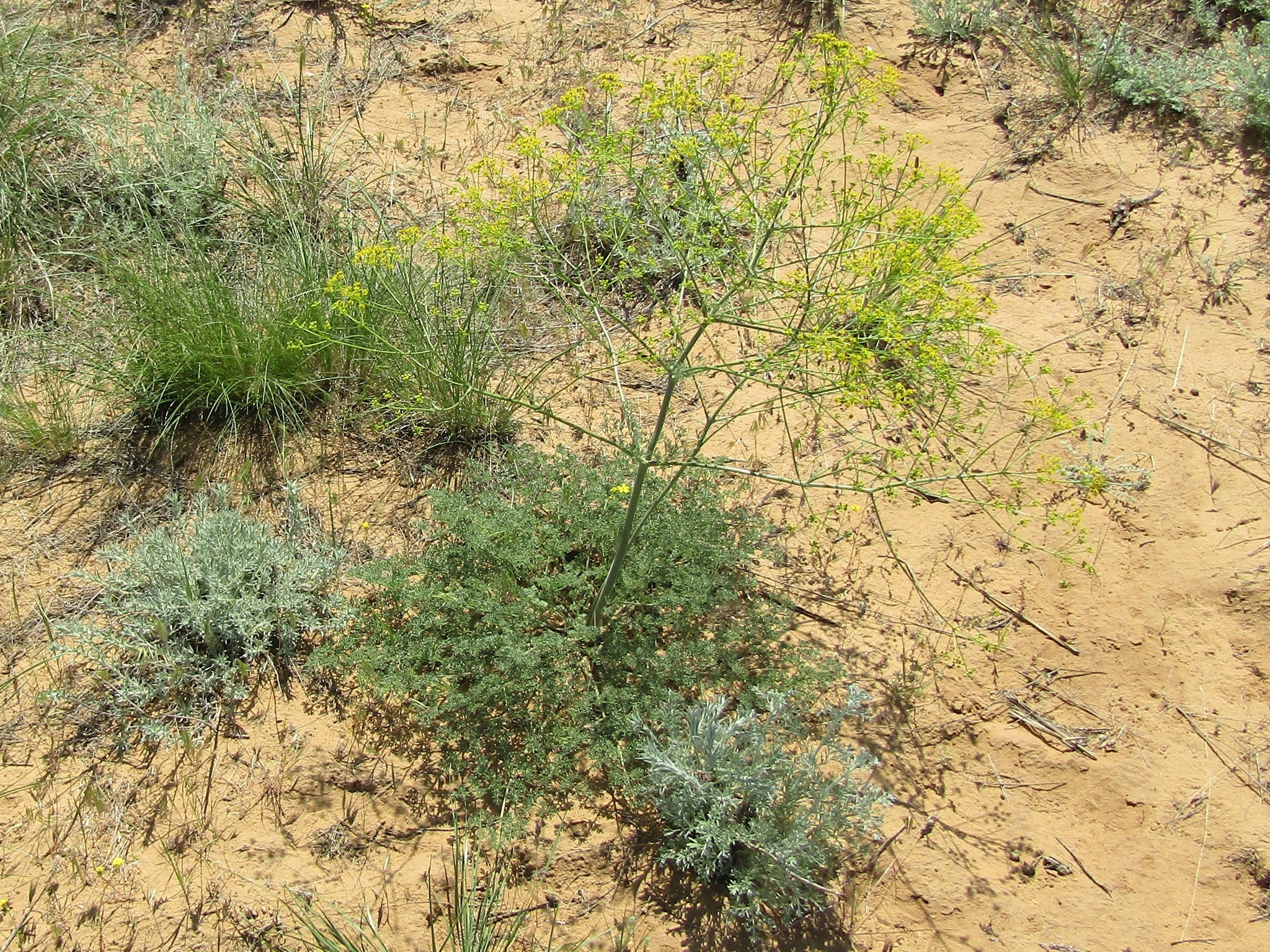
- Elaeosticta lutea

Scientific classification
- Kingdom: Plantae
- Clade: Tracheophytes
- Clade: Angiosperms
- Clade: Eudicots
- Clade: Asterids
- Order: Apiales
- Family: Apiaceae
- Subfamily: Apioideae
- Tribe: Pyramidoptereae
- Genus: Elaeosticta; Fenzl

Synonyms
- Muretia Boiss.

= Elaeosticta =

Genus of plants

Elaeosticta is a genus of flowering plants belonging to the family Apiaceae.

Its native range is Ukraine to Central Asia and Western Himalaya.

Species:

- Elaeosticta alaica (Lipsky) Kljuykov, Pimenov & V.N.Tikhom.
- Elaeosticta allioides (Regel & Schmalh.) Kljuykov, Pimenov & V.N.Tikhom.
- Elaeosticta aurea (Boiss.) Menemen
- Elaeosticta bucharica (Korovin) Kljuykov, Pimenov & V.N.Tikhom.
- Elaeosticta chitralica (M.Hiroe) Kljuykov, Pimenov & V.N.Tikhom.
- Elaeosticta conica Korovin
- Elaeosticta ferganensis (Lipsky) Kljuykov, Pimenov & V.N.Tikhom.
- Elaeosticta glaucescens (DC.) Boiss.
- Elaeosticta hirtula (Regel & Schmalh.) Kljuykov, Pimenov & V.N.Tikhom.
- Elaeosticta knorringiana (Korovin) Korovin
- Elaeosticta korovinii (Bobrov) Kljuykov, Pimenov & V.N.Tikhom.
- Elaeosticta lutea (M.Bieb. ex Hoffm.) Kljuykov, Pimenov & V.N.Tikhom.
- Elaeosticta meifolia Fenzl
- Elaeosticta nodosa (Boiss.) Boiss.
- Elaeosticta paniculata (Korovin) Kljuykov & Pimenov
- Elaeosticta platyphylla (Korovin) Kljuykov, Pimenov & V.N.Tikhom.
- Elaeosticta polycarpa (Korovin) Kljuykov, Pimenov & V.N.Tikhom.
- Elaeosticta ramosissima Kljuykov
- Elaeosticta samarkandica (Korovin) Kljuykov, Pimenov & V.N.Tikhom.
- Elaeosticta seravschanica Kljuykov & Pimenov
- Elaeosticta transcaspica (Korovin) Kljuykov, Pimenov & V.N.Tikhom.
- Elaeosticta transitoria (Korovin) Kljuykov, Pimenov & V.N.Tikhom.
- Elaeosticta tschimganica (Korovin) Kljuykov, Pimenov & V.N.Tikhom.
- Elaeosticta ugamica (Korovin) Korovin
- Elaeosticta vvedenskyi (Kamelin) Kljuykov, Pimenov & V.N.Tikhom.
