= Thecocarpus =

Scientific classification
- Kingdom: Plantae
- Clade: Tracheophytes
- Clade: Angiosperms
- Clade: Eudicots
- Clade: Asterids
- Order: Apiales
- Family: Apiaceae
- Subfamily: Apioideae
- Tribe: Selineae
- Genus: Thecocarpus; Boiss.

Genus of flowering plants

Thecocarpus is a genus of flowering plants belonging to the family Apiaceae.

Its native range is Southern Turkey to Iran.

Species:

- Thecocarpus carvifolius (Boiss. & Balansa) Hedge & Lamond
- Thecocarpus meifolius Boiss.
