= Rohmooa =

Scientific classification
- Kingdom: Plantae
- Clade: Tracheophytes
- Clade: Angiosperms
- Clade: Eudicots
- Clade: Asterids
- Order: Apiales
- Family: Apiaceae
- Subfamily: Apioideae
- Genus: Rohmooa; Farille & Lachard
- Species: R. kirmzii

Binomial name
- Rohmooa kirmzii Farille & Lachard

Genus of flowering plant

Rohmooa is a genus of flowering plant in the family Apiaceae. Its only species is Rohmooa kirmzii, endemic to Nepal. The genus and species were first described in 2002.
