= Chaerophyllopsis =

Scientific classification
- Kingdom: Plantae
- Clade: Tracheophytes
- Clade: Angiosperms
- Clade: Eudicots
- Clade: Asterids
- Order: Apiales
- Family: Apiaceae
- Subfamily: Apioideae
- Tribe: Scandiceae
- Subtribe: Scandicinae
- Genus: Chaerophyllopsis; H.Boissieu
- Species: C. huai

Binomial name
- Chaerophyllopsis huai H. Boissieu

Genus of flowering plants

Chaerophyllopsis huai is a species of flowering plant in the family Apiaceae, the only member of the genus Chaerophyllopsis. It is endemic to China.
