= Pseudocannaboides =

Scientific classification
- Kingdom: Plantae
- Clade: Tracheophytes
- Clade: Angiosperms
- Clade: Eudicots
- Clade: Asterids
- Order: Apiales
- Family: Apiaceae
- Subfamily: Apioideae
- Tribe: Heteromorpheae
- Genus: Pseudocannaboides; B.-E.van Wyk

Genus of plants

Pseudocannaboides is a genus of flowering plants belonging to the family Apiaceae.

Its native range is Madagascar.

Species:

- Pseudocannaboides andringitrensis (Humbert) B.-E.van Wyk
