= Enantiophylla =

Scientific classification
- Kingdom: Plantae
- Clade: Tracheophytes
- Clade: Angiosperms
- Clade: Eudicots
- Clade: Asterids
- Order: Apiales
- Family: Apiaceae
- Subfamily: Apioideae
- Tribe: Selineae
- Genus: Enantiophylla; J.M.Coult. & Rose
- Species: E. heydeana

Binomial name
- Enantiophylla heydeana J.M.Coult. & Rose

Genus of plants

Enantiophylla is a genus of flowering plants belonging to the family Apiaceae. It has one species, Enantiophylla heydeana, native to Mexico and Central America.
