= Gongylosciadium =

Scientific classification
- Kingdom: Plantae
- Clade: Tracheophytes
- Clade: Angiosperms
- Clade: Eudicots
- Clade: Asterids
- Order: Apiales
- Family: Apiaceae
- Subfamily: Apioideae
- Tribe: Careae
- Genus: Gongylosciadium; Rech.f.

Genus of plants

Gongylosciadium is a genus of flowering plants belonging to the family Apiaceae.

It is native to regions ranging from Turkey to Iran.

Species:

- Gongylosciadium falcarioides (Bornm. & H.Wolff) Rech.f.
