= Hellenocarum =

Scientific classification
- Kingdom: Plantae
- Clade: Tracheophytes
- Clade: Angiosperms
- Clade: Eudicots
- Clade: Asterids
- Order: Apiales
- Family: Apiaceae
- Subfamily: Apioideae
- Tribe: Pyramidoptereae
- Genus: Hellenocarum; H.Wolff

Genus of plants

Hellenocarum is a genus of flowering plants belonging to the family Apiaceae.

Its native range is Southeastern Europe to Turkey, Cyprus.

Species:

- Hellenocarum depressum (Hartvig & Kit Tan) Kljuykov & Zakharova
- Hellenocarum multiflorum (Sm.) H.Wolff
- Hellenocarum strictum (Griseb.) Hand
