= Microsciadium =

Scientific classification
- Kingdom: Plantae
- Clade: Tracheophytes
- Clade: Angiosperms
- Clade: Eudicots
- Clade: Asterids
- Order: Apiales
- Family: Apiaceae
- Subfamily: Apioideae
- Tribe: Pyramidoptereae
- Genus: Microsciadium; Boiss.
- Species: M. minutum

Binomial name
- Microsciadium minutum (d'Urv.) Briq.

Synonyms
- Azorella minuta (d'Urv.) M.Hiroe; Carum minutum (d'Urv.) Koso-Pol.; Cuminum minutum d'Urv.; Microsciadium tenuifolium Boiss., nom. superfl.

Genus of plants

Microsciadium is a monotypic genus of flowering plants in the family Apiaceae. Its sole species is Microsciadium minutum, native to the eastern Aegean Islands and Turkey. The genus was first described by Pierre Edmond Boissier in 1844. The species was first described in 1822 as Cuminum minutum.
