= Dicyclophora =

Scientific classification
- Kingdom: Plantae
- Clade: Tracheophytes
- Clade: Angiosperms
- Clade: Eudicots
- Clade: Asterids
- Order: Apiales
- Family: Apiaceae
- Subfamily: Apioideae
- Tribe: Echinophoreae
- Genus: Dicyclophora; Boiss.

Genus of plants

Dicyclophora is a genus of flowering plants belonging to the family Apiaceae.

Its native range is Iran.

== Species ==
- Dicyclophora persica Boiss.
