= Sinocarum =

Scientific classification
- Kingdom: Plantae
- Clade: Tracheophytes
- Clade: Angiosperms
- Clade: Eudicots
- Clade: Asterids
- Order: Apiales
- Family: Apiaceae
- Subfamily: Apioideae
- Genus: Sinocarum; H.Wolff ex R.H.Shan & F.T.Pu

Genus of plants

Sinocarum is a genus of flowering plants belonging to the family Apiaceae.

Its native range is Himalaya to Southern Central China and Myanmar.

Species:

- Sinocarum acronemifolium (C.B.Clarke) P.K.Mukh. & Constance
- Sinocarum bellum (C.B.Clarke) Pimenov & Kljuykov
- Sinocarum clarkeanum P.K.Mukh. & Constance
- Sinocarum coloratum (Diels) H.Wolff ex F.T.Pu
- Sinocarum cruciatum (Franch.) H.Wolff ex F.T.Pu
- Sinocarum digitatum (Kljuykov) Pimenov & Kljuykov
- Sinocarum dolichopodum (Diels) H.Wolff ex F.T.Pu
- Sinocarum filicinum H.Wolff
- Sinocarum latifoliolatum Pimenov & Kljuykov
- Sinocarum longii M.F.Watson
- Sinocarum meeboldioides Pimenov & Kljuykov
- Sinocarum normanianum (Cauwet & Farille) Farille
- Sinocarum pityophilum (Diels) H.Wolff ex F.T.Pu, M.F.Watson & Holmes-Sm.
- Sinocarum pulchellum C.Norman ex M.F.Watson
- Sinocarum sikkimense (P.K.Mukh.) P.K.Mukh. & Constance
- Sinocarum staintonianum P.K.Mukh. ex Farille & Lachard
- Sinocarum vaginatum H.Wolff
- Sinocarum wolffianum (Fedde ex H.Wolff) P.K.Mukh. & Constance
- Sinocarum woodii M.F.Watson
