= Mogoltavia =

Scientific classification
- Kingdom: Plantae
- Clade: Tracheophytes
- Clade: Angiosperms
- Clade: Eudicots
- Clade: Asterids
- Order: Apiales
- Family: Apiaceae
- Subfamily: Apioideae
- Tribe: Pyramidoptereae
- Genus: Mogoltavia; Korovin

Genus of plants

Mogoltavia is a genus of flowering plants belonging to the family Apiaceae.

Its native range is Central Asia.

Species:

- Mogoltavia narynensis Pimenov & Kljuykov
- Mogoltavia sewerzowii (Regel) Korovin
