= Symphyoloma =

Scientific classification
- Kingdom: Plantae
- Clade: Tracheophytes
- Clade: Angiosperms
- Clade: Eudicots
- Clade: Asterids
- Order: Apiales
- Family: Apiaceae
- Subfamily: Apioideae
- Tribe: Tordylieae
- Subtribe: Tordyliinae
- Genus: Symphyoloma; C.A.Mey.
- Species: S. graveolens

Binomial name
- Symphyoloma graveolens C.A.Mey.

Genus of flowering plants

Symphyoloma is a genus of flowering plants belonging to the family Apiaceae. Its only species is Symphyoloma graveolens. Its native range is the Caucasus.
