= Vanasushava =

Scientific classification
- Kingdom: Plantae
- Clade: Tracheophytes
- Clade: Angiosperms
- Clade: Eudicots
- Clade: Asterids
- Order: Apiales
- Family: Apiaceae
- Subfamily: Apioideae
- Tribe: Tordylieae
- Subtribe: Tordyliinae
- Genus: Vanasushava; P.K.Mukh. & Constance
- Species: V. pedata

Binomial name
- Vanasushava pedata (Wight) P.K.Mukh. & Constance

Genus of flowering plants

Vanasushava is a monotypic genus of flowering plants belonging to the family Apiaceae. Its only species is Vanasushava pedata. Its native range is Southwestern India.
