= Cannaboides =

Scientific classification
- Kingdom: Plantae
- Clade: Embryophytes
- Clade: Tracheophytes
- Clade: Spermatophytes
- Clade: Angiosperms
- Clade: Eudicots
- Clade: Asterids
- Order: Apiales
- Family: Apiaceae
- Subfamily: Apioideae
- Tribe: Heteromorpheae
- Genus: Cannaboides; B.-E.van Wyk

Genus of flowering plants

Cannaboides is a genus of flowering plants belonging to the family Apiaceae.

Its native range is Madagascar.

Species:

- Cannaboides andohahelensis (Humbert) B.-E.van Wyk
- Cannaboides betsileensis (Humbert) B.-E.van Wyk
