= Demavendia =

Scientific classification
- Kingdom: Plantae
- Clade: Tracheophytes
- Clade: Angiosperms
- Clade: Eudicots
- Clade: Asterids
- Order: Apiales
- Family: Apiaceae
- Subfamily: Apioideae
- Tribe: Pimpinelleae
- Genus: Demavendia; Pimenov
- Species: D. pastinacifolia

Binomial name
- Demavendia pastinacifolia (Boiss. & Hausskn.) Pimenov

Genus of flowering plants

Demavendia is a monotypic genus of flowering plants belonging to the family Apiaceae. The sole species is Demavendia pastinacifolia.

Its native range is Western and Central Asia.
