= Hymenidium =

Scientific classification
- Kingdom: Plantae
- Clade: Tracheophytes
- Clade: Angiosperms
- Clade: Eudicots
- Clade: Asterids
- Order: Apiales
- Family: Apiaceae
- Subfamily: Apioideae
- Tribe: Pleurospermeae
- Genus: Hymenidium; Lindl.

Genus of plants

Hymenidium is a genus of flowering plants belonging to the family Apiaceae.

Its native range is Central Asia to China and Himalaya.

Species:

- Hymenidium album (C.B.Clarke ex H.Wolff) Pimenov & Kljuykov
- Hymenidium amabile (Craib & W.W.Sm.) Pimenov & Kljuykov
- Hymenidium apiolens (C.B.Clarke) Pimenov & Kljuykov
- Hymenidium astrantioideum (H.Boissieu) Pimenov & Kljuykov
- Hymenidium benthamii (DC.) Pimenov & Kljuykov
- Hymenidium bicolor (Franch.) Pimenov & Kljuykov
- Hymenidium brunonis (DC.) Lindl.
- Hymenidium chloroleucum (Diels) Pimenov & Kljuykov
- Hymenidium corydalifolium (Aitch. & Hemsl.) Pimenov & Kljuykov
- Hymenidium cristatum (H.Boissieu) Pimenov & Kljuykov
- Hymenidium davidii (Franch.) Pimenov & Kljuykov
- Hymenidium decurrens (Franch.) Pimenov & Kljuykov
- Hymenidium delavayi (Franch.) Pimenov & Kljuykov
- Hymenidium densiflorum Lindl.
- Hymenidium dentatum (DC.) Pimenov & Kljuykov
- Hymenidium foetens (Franch.) Pimenov & Kljuykov
- Hymenidium giraldii (Diels) Pimenov & Kljuykov
- Hymenidium hedinii (Diels) Pimenov & Kljuykov
- Hymenidium heracleifolium (Franch. ex H.Boissieu) Pimenov & Kljuykov
- Hymenidium heterosciadium (H.Wolff) Pimenov & Kljuykov
- Hymenidium hookeri (C.B.Clarke) Pimenov & Kljuykov
- Hymenidium huzhihaoi Pimenov & Kljuykov
- Hymenidium ladyginii Pimenov & Kljuykov
- Hymenidium lhasanum Pimenov & Kljuykov
- Hymenidium lindleyanum (Klotzsch) Pimenov & Kljuykov
- Hymenidium linearilobum (W.W.Sm.) Pimenov & Kljuykov
- Hymenidium macrochlaenum (K.T.Fu & Y.C.Ho) Pimenov & Kljuykov
- Hymenidium mieheanum Pimenov & Kljuykov
- Hymenidium nubigenum (H.Wolff) Pimenov & Kljuykov
- Hymenidium pachycaule Pimenov & Kljuykov
- Hymenidium pilosum (C.B.Clarke ex H.Wolff) Pimenov & Kljuykov
- Hymenidium pulszkyi (Kanitz) Pimenov & Kljuykov
- Hymenidium stellatum (D.Don) Pimenov & Kljuykov
- Hymenidium szechenyi (Kanitz) Pimenov & Kljuykov
- Hymenidium tsekuense (R.H.Shan) Pimenov & Kljuykov
- Hymenidium virgatum Pimenov & Kljuykov
- Hymenidium wilsonii (H.Boissieu) Pimenov & Kljuykov
- Hymenidium wrightianum (H.Boissieu) Pimenov & Kljuykov
- Hymenidium yunnanense (Franch.) Pimenov & Kljuykov
