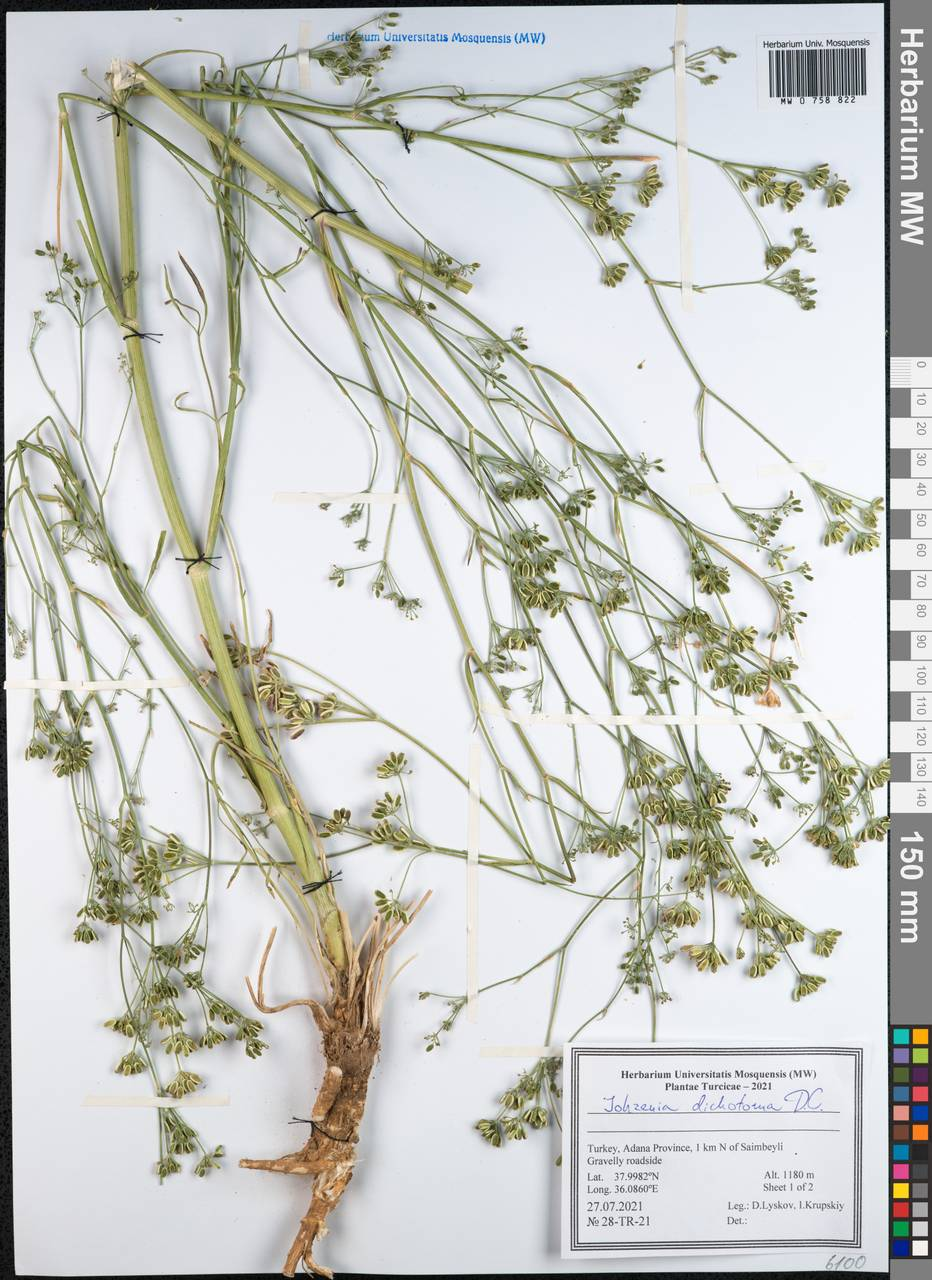

Scientific classification
- Kingdom: Plantae
- Clade: Tracheophytes
- Clade: Angiosperms
- Clade: Eudicots
- Clade: Asterids
- Order: Apiales
- Family: Apiaceae
- Subfamily: Apioideae
- Tribe: Selineae
- Genus: Johrenia; DC.

Synonyms
- Caroselinum Griseb.

= Johrenia =

Genus of plants

Johrenia is a genus of herbaceous plants of the family Apiaceae.

== Taxonomy ==
The genus was described by Augustin Pyramus de Candolle in 1829. The type species is Johrenia dichotoma.

== Species ==
Below is a list of species of the genus Johrenia accepted by Plants of the World Online as of December 2022.

- Johrenia anatolica (Pimenov & Kljuykov) Menemen
- Johrenia dichotoma DC.
- Johrenia distans (Griseb.) Halácsy
- Johrenia polyscias Bornm.
- Johrenia selinoides Boiss. & Balansa
- Johrenia tortuosa (Fisch. & C.A.Mey.) D.F.Chamb.
