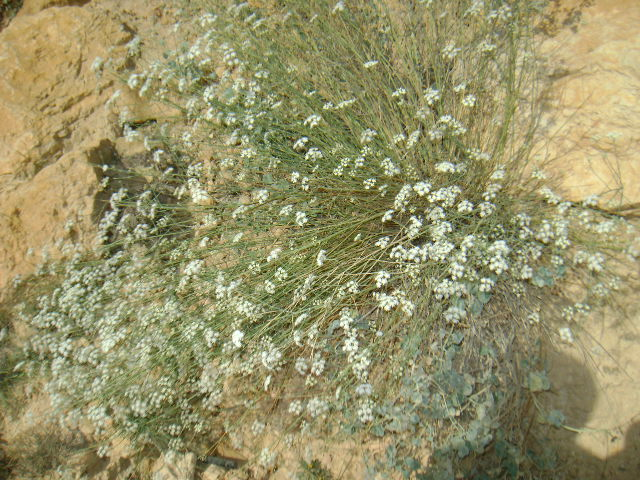
- Deverra tortusa

Scientific classification
- Kingdom: Plantae
- Clade: Tracheophytes
- Clade: Angiosperms
- Clade: Eudicots
- Clade: Asterids
- Order: Apiales
- Family: Apiaceae
- Subfamily: Apioideae
- Tribe: Apieae
- Genus: Deverra; DC.

Species
- See text.

Synonyms
- Hymenophora Viv. ex Coss.; Pithuranthos DC., orth. var.; Pituranthos Viv.

= Deverra (plant) =

Genus of plants

Deverra is a genus of flowering plant in the family Apiaceae, native from northern Africa to the Arabian Peninsula and Iraq, and to south tropical and southern Africa. The genus was first described by Augustin de Candolle in 1829.

== Species ==
As of December 2022, Plants of the World Online accepted the following species:

- Deverra aphylla (Cham. & Schltdl.) DC.
- Deverra battandieri (Maire) Podlech
- Deverra burchellii (DC.) Eckl. & Zeyh.
- Deverra denudata (Viv.) Pfisterer & Podlech
- Deverra juncea Ball
- Deverra rapaletsa Magee & Zietsman
- Deverra reboudii Coss. & Durieu
- Deverra scoparia Coss. & Durieu
- Deverra tortuosa (Desf.) DC.
- Deverra triradiata Hochst. ex Boiss.
