= Melanosciadium =

Scientific classification
- Kingdom: Plantae
- Clade: Tracheophytes
- Clade: Angiosperms
- Clade: Eudicots
- Clade: Asterids
- Order: Apiales
- Family: Apiaceae
- Subfamily: Apioideae
- Tribe: Selineae
- Genus: Melanosciadium; H.Boissieu

Species
- 3; see text

Genus of flowering plants

Melanosciadium is a genus of flowering plants in the family Apiaceae. It includes three species native to south-central China.

- Melanosciadium bipinnatum (R.H.Shan & F.T.Pu) Pimenov & Kljuykov
- Melanosciadium genuflexum Pimenov & Kljuykov
- Melanosciadium pimpinelloideum H.Boissieu
