= Sclerosciadium =

Scientific classification
- Kingdom: Plantae
- Clade: Tracheophytes
- Clade: Angiosperms
- Clade: Eudicots
- Clade: Asterids
- Order: Apiales
- Family: Apiaceae
- Subfamily: Apioideae
- Tribe: Apieae
- Genus: Sclerosciadium; W.D.J.Koch ex DC.
- Species: S. nodiflorum

Binomial name
- Sclerosciadium nodiflorum (Schousb.) Ball

Synonyms
- Capnophyllum nodiflorum (Schousb.) Drude ex Engl.; Oenanthe nodiflora Schousb.; Sclerosciadium humile W.D.J.Koch ex DC., nom. superfl.

Genus of plants

Sclerosciadium is a monotypic genus of flowering plant in the family Apiaceae. Its sole species is Sclerosciadium nodiflorum, native to Morocco and Western Sahara. The species was first described in 1800 as Oenanthe nodiflora.
