= Eurytaenia =

Scientific classification
- Kingdom: Plantae
- Clade: Tracheophytes
- Clade: Angiosperms
- Clade: Eudicots
- Clade: Asterids
- Order: Apiales
- Family: Apiaceae
- Subfamily: Apioideae
- Tribe: Selineae
- Genus: Eurytaenia; Torr. & A.Gray

Genus of plants

Eurytaenia is a genus of flowering plants belonging to the family Apiaceae.

Its native range is Oklahoma to Texas.

Species:

- Eurytaenia hinckleyi Mathias & Constance
- Eurytaenia texana Torr. & A.Gray
