= Sphaerosciadium =

Scientific classification
- Kingdom: Plantae
- Clade: Tracheophytes
- Clade: Angiosperms
- Clade: Eudicots
- Clade: Asterids
- Order: Apiales
- Family: Apiaceae
- Subfamily: Apioideae
- Tribe: Komarovieae
- Genus: Sphaerosciadium; Pimenov & Kljuykov

Genus of flowering plants

Sphaerosciadium is a genus of flowering plants belonging to the family Apiaceae.

The species of this genus are found in Uzbekistan.

Species:

- Sphaerosciadium denaense (Schischk.) Pimenov & Kljuykov
