= Phellolophium =

Scientific classification
- Kingdom: Plantae
- Clade: Tracheophytes
- Clade: Angiosperms
- Clade: Eudicots
- Clade: Asterids
- Order: Apiales
- Family: Apiaceae
- Subfamily: Apioideae
- Tribe: Pimpinelleae
- Genus: Phellolophium; Baker
- Species: P. madagascariense

Binomial name
- Phellolophium madagascariense Baker

Genus of plants

Phellolophium is a genus of flowering plants belonging to the family Apiaceae. It has only one species, Phellolophium madagascariense. Its native range is Madagascar.
