= Arcuatopterus =

Scientific classification
- Kingdom: Plantae
- Clade: Tracheophytes
- Clade: Angiosperms
- Clade: Eudicots
- Clade: Asterids
- Order: Apiales
- Family: Apiaceae
- Tribe: Selineae
- Genus: Arcuatopterus; M.L.Sheh & R.H.Shan

Species
- Arcuatopterus harae (Pimenov) Pimenov & Ostr.; Arcuatopterus linearifolius M.I.Sheh & R.H.Shan; Arcuatopterus ramosissimus (DC.) Pimenov & Ostr.; Arcuatopterus sikkimensis (C.B.Clarke) Pimenov & Ostr.; Arcuatopterus thalictrioideus M.I.Sheh & R.H.Shan

Genus of flowering plants

Arcuatopterus is a genus of flowering plant in the Apiaceae, with five species. It is native from the Himalayas to south-central China.
