= Pleurospermopsis =

Scientific classification
- Kingdom: Plantae
- Clade: Tracheophytes
- Clade: Angiosperms
- Clade: Eudicots
- Clade: Asterids
- Order: Apiales
- Family: Apiaceae
- Subfamily: Apioideae
- Genus: Pleurospermopsis; C.Norman

Genus of plants

Pleurospermopsis is a genus of flowering plants belonging to the family Apiaceae.

Its native range is Himalaya to Southern Central China.

Species:

- Pleurospermopsis bicolor (Franch.) Jing Zhou & Jin Wei
- Pleurospermopsis sikkimensis (C.B.Clarke) C.Norman
