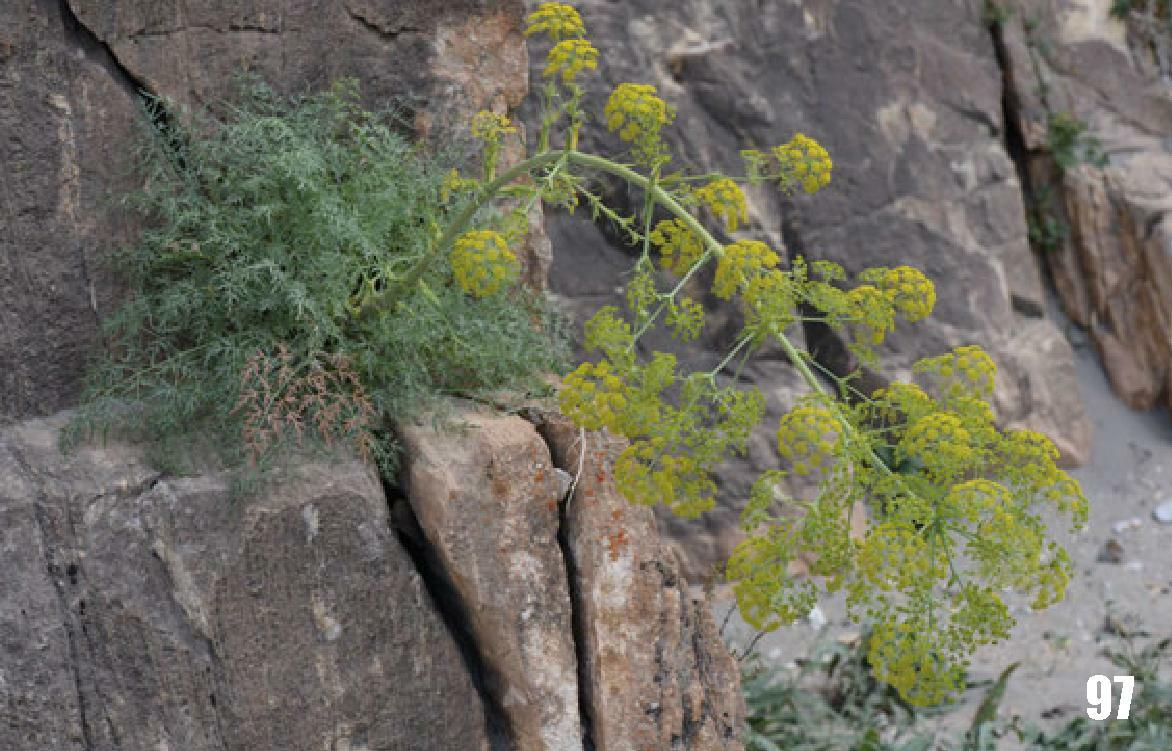
- Cephalopodum badachshanicum

Scientific classification
- Kingdom: Plantae
- Clade: Tracheophytes
- Clade: Angiosperms
- Clade: Eudicots
- Clade: Asterids
- Order: Apiales
- Family: Apiaceae
- Subfamily: Apioideae
- Tribe: Scandiceae
- Genus: Cephalopodum; Korovin

Species
- See text.

= Cephalopodum =

Genus of flowering plants

Cephalopodum is a genus of flowering plant in the family Apiaceae. It is native to the Afghanistan, Tadzhikistan and Uzbekistan.

== Species ==
As of December 2022, Plants of the World Online accepted three species:

- Cephalopodum afghanicum (Rech.f. & Riedl) Pimenov & Kljuykov
- Cephalopodum badachshanicum Korovin
- Cephalopodum hissaricum Pimenov
