= Bilacunaria =

Scientific classification
- Kingdom: Plantae
- Clade: Tracheophytes
- Clade: Angiosperms
- Clade: Eudicots
- Clade: Asterids
- Order: Apiales
- Family: Apiaceae
- Subfamily: Apioideae
- Genus: Bilacunaria; Pimenov & V.N.Tikhom.

Species
- Bilacunaria aksekiensis A.Duran & B.Doğan; Bilacunaria anatolica A.Duran; Bilacunaria boissieri (Reut. & Hausskn. ex Boiss.) Pimenov & V.N.Tikhom.; Bilacunaria caspica (DC.) Pimenov & V.N.Tikhom.; Bilacunaria microcarpos (M.Bieb.) Pimenov & V.N.Tikhom.; Bilacunaria scabra (Fenzl) Pimenov & V.N.Tikhom.

Genus of flowering plants

Bilacunaria is a genus of flowering plant in the family Apiaceae, with six species. It is native from the east Caucasus to West Asia.
