= Xanthogalum =

Scientific classification
- Kingdom: Plantae
- Clade: Tracheophytes
- Clade: Angiosperms
- Clade: Eudicots
- Clade: Asterids
- Order: Apiales
- Family: Apiaceae
- Tribe: Selineae
- Genus: Xanthogalum; Avé-Lall.

Species
- See text.

Genus of flowering plants

Xanthogalum is a genus of flowering plants in the family Apiaceae. Its species are native to Iran, the Caucasus and Turkey.

== Species ==
As of November 2022, Plants of the World Online accepted the following species:

- Xanthogalum purpurascens Avé-Lall.
- Xanthogalum sachokianum Karyagin
- Xanthogalum tatianae (Bordz.) Schischk.
