= Ormopterum =

Scientific classification
- Kingdom: Plantae
- Clade: Tracheophytes
- Clade: Angiosperms
- Clade: Eudicots
- Clade: Asterids
- Order: Apiales
- Family: Apiaceae
- Subfamily: Apioideae
- Tribe: Pyramidoptereae
- Genus: Ormopterum; Schischk.

Genus of plants

Ormopterum is a genus of flowering plants belonging to the family Apiaceae.

Its native range is Turkemenistan to Pakistan.

Species:

- Ormopterum tuberosum Nasir
- Ormopterum turcomanicum (Korovin) Schischk.
