= Oligocladus patagonicus =

Scientific classification
- Kingdom: Plantae
- Clade: Tracheophytes
- Clade: Angiosperms
- Clade: Eudicots
- Clade: Asterids
- Order: Apiales
- Family: Apiaceae
- Subfamily: Apioideae
- Tribe: Selineae
- Genus: Oligocladus; Chodat & Wilczek
- Species: O. patagonicus

Binomial name
- Oligocladus patagonicus (Speg.) Pérez-Mor.

Synonyms
- Aulosolena patagonica (Speg.) Koso-Pol.; Sanicula patagonica Speg.; Oligocladus andinus Chodat & Wilczek

Species of plant

Oligocladus patagonicus is a species of flowering plant in the family Apiaceae, native to west and central Argentina. It was first described in 1902 as Sanicula patagonica. It is the only species in the genus Oligocladus.
