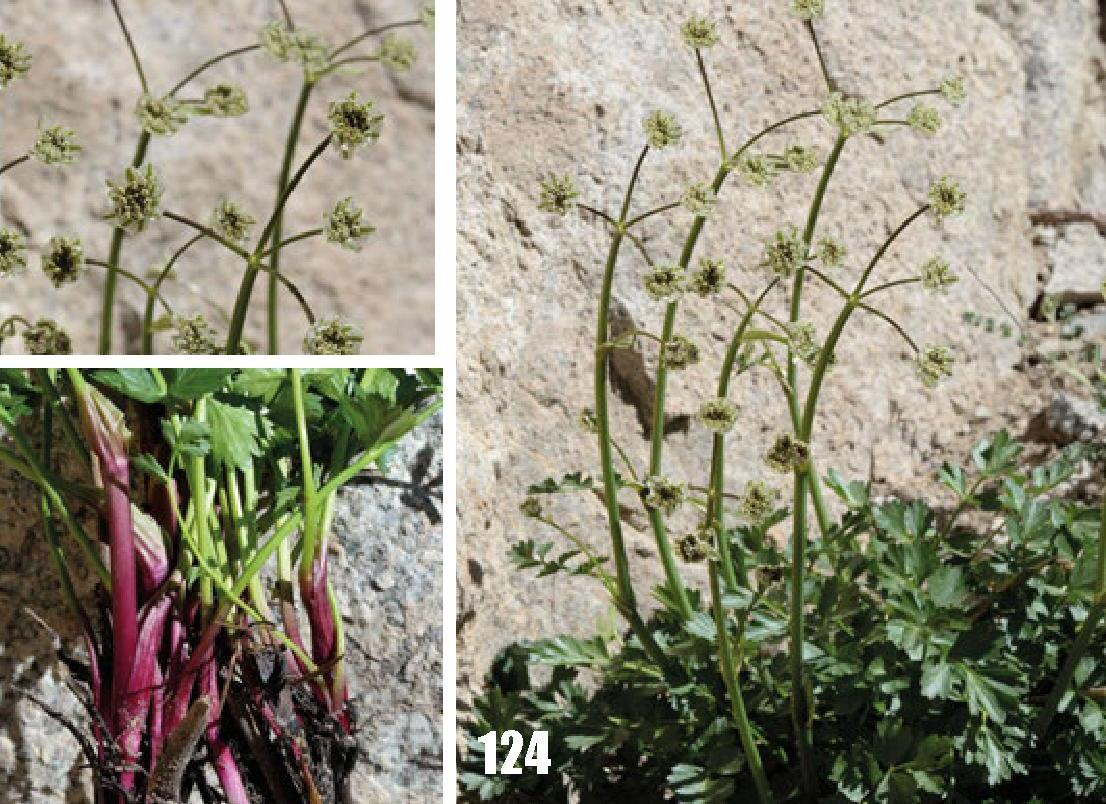
- Hymenolaena badachschanica

Scientific classification
- Kingdom: Plantae
- Clade: Tracheophytes
- Clade: Angiosperms
- Clade: Eudicots
- Clade: Asterids
- Order: Apiales
- Family: Apiaceae
- Subfamily: Apioideae
- Genus: Hymenolaena; DC.

= Hymenolaena =

Genus of plants

Hymenolaena is a genus of flowering plants belonging to the family Apiaceae.

Its native range is Afghanistan to Central Asia and Western Himalaya.

Species:

- Hymenolaena badachschanica Pissjauk.
- Hymenolaena candollei DC.
- Hymenolaena polyphylla Rech.f.
