= Arafoe =

- Arafoe aromatica

Scientific classification
- Kingdom: Plantae
- Clade: Tracheophytes
- Clade: Angiosperms
- Clade: Eudicots
- Clade: Asterids
- Order: Apiales
- Family: Apiaceae
- Subfamily: Apioideae
- Tribe: Pimpinelleae
- Genus: Arafoe; Pimenov & Lavrova
- Species: A. aromatica

Binomial name
- Arafoe aromatica Pimenov & Lavrova

Genus of flowering plants

Arafoe is a genus of flowering plants belonging to the family Apiaceae. The only species is Arafoe aromatica.

Its native range is Transcaucasus.
