= Chuanminshen =

Scientific classification
- Kingdom: Plantae
- Clade: Tracheophytes
- Clade: Angiosperms
- Clade: Eudicots
- Clade: Asterids
- Order: Apiales
- Family: Apiaceae
- Subfamily: Apioideae
- Tribe: Komarovieae
- Genus: Chuanminshen; M.L.Sheh & R.H.Shan
- Species: C. violaceus

Binomial name
- Chuanminshen violaceus M.L.Sheh & R.H.Shan

Genus of flowering plants

Chuanminshen violaceus is a species of flowering plant in the Apiaceae, of the monotypic genus Chuanminshen. It is endemic to China.
