= Tongoloa =

Scientific classification
- Kingdom: Plantae
- Clade: Tracheophytes
- Clade: Angiosperms
- Clade: Eudicots
- Clade: Asterids
- Order: Apiales
- Family: Apiaceae
- Subfamily: Apioideae
- Genus: Tongoloa; H.Wolff

Genus of flowering plants

Tongoloa is a genus of flowering plants belonging to the family Apiaceae.

Its native range is Himalaya to China.

Species:

- Tongoloa dunnii (H.Boissieu) H.Wolff
- Tongoloa elata H.Wolff
