= Trocdaris =

Scientific classification
- Kingdom: Plantae
- Clade: Tracheophytes
- Clade: Angiosperms
- Clade: Eudicots
- Clade: Asterids
- Order: Apiales
- Family: Apiaceae
- Subfamily: Apioideae
- Tribe: Oenantheae
- Genus: Trocdaris; Raf.
- Species: T. verticillata

Binomial name
- Trocdaris verticillata (L.) Raf.

Genus of flowering plants

Trocdaris is a genus of flowering plants belonging to the family Apiaceae. It has only one species, Trocdaris verticillata. Its native range is Western and Southwestern Europe and Morocco.
