= Perissocoeleum =

Scientific classification
- Kingdom: Plantae
- Clade: Tracheophytes
- Clade: Angiosperms
- Clade: Eudicots
- Clade: Asterids
- Order: Apiales
- Family: Apiaceae
- Subfamily: Apioideae
- Tribe: Selineae
- Genus: Perissocoeleum; Mathias & Constance

Genus of plants

Perissocoeleum is a genus of flowering plants belonging to the family Apiaceae.

Its native range is Colombia to Venezuela.

Species:

- Perissocoeleum barclayae Mathias & Constance
- Perissocoeleum crinoideum (Mathias & Constance) Mathias & Constance
- Perissocoeleum phylloideum (Mathias & Constance) Mathias & Constance
- Perissocoeleum purdiei Mathias & Constance
