= Cyathoselinum =

Scientific classification
- Kingdom: Plantae
- Clade: Tracheophytes
- Clade: Angiosperms
- Clade: Eudicots
- Clade: Asterids
- Order: Apiales
- Family: Apiaceae
- Subfamily: Apioideae
- Tribe: Selineae
- Genus: Cyathoselinum; Benth.
- Species: C. tomentosum

Binomial name
- Cyathoselinum tomentosum (Vis.) Benth. & Hook.f. ex Arcang.

Genus of flowering plants

Cyathoselinum is a genus of flowering plants belonging to the family Apiaceae. Its sole species is Cyathoselinum tomentosum. Its native range is Southeastern Europe.
