= Paraligusticum =

Scientific classification
- Kingdom: Plantae
- Clade: Tracheophytes
- Clade: Angiosperms
- Clade: Eudicots
- Clade: Asterids
- Order: Apiales
- Family: Apiaceae
- Subfamily: Apioideae
- Genus: Paraligusticum; V.N.Tikhom.
- Species: P. discolor

Binomial name
- Paraligusticum discolor (Ledeb.) V.N.Tikhom.

Genus of plants

Paraligusticum is a genus of flowering plants belonging to the family Apiaceae. It has only one species, Paraligusticum discolor. Its native range is Central Asia to Mongolia.
