= Schoenoselinum =

Scientific classification
- Kingdom: Plantae
- Clade: Tracheophytes
- Clade: Angiosperms
- Clade: Eudicots
- Clade: Asterids
- Order: Apiales
- Family: Apiaceae
- Subfamily: Apioideae
- Tribe: Apieae
- Genus: Schoenoselinum; Jim.Mejías & P.Vargas
- Species: S. foeniculoides

Binomial name
- Schoenoselinum foeniculoides (Maire & Wilczek) Jim.Mejías & P.Vargas

Synonyms
- Anethum foeniculoides Maire & Wilczek (1936)

Genus of flowering plants

Schoenoselinum is a genus of flowering plants in the family Apiaceae. It includes a single species, Schoenoselinum foeniculoides, an annual native to Morocco, Western Sahara, and northern Mauritania, where it grows in deserts and dry shrublands.
