= Karatavia =

Scientific classification
- Kingdom: Plantae
- Clade: Tracheophytes
- Clade: Angiosperms
- Clade: Eudicots
- Clade: Asterids
- Order: Apiales
- Family: Apiaceae
- Subfamily: Apioideae
- Tribe: Selineae
- Genus: Karatavia; Pimenov & Lavrova
- Species: K. kultiassovii

Binomial name
- Karatavia kultiassovii (Korovin) Pimenov & Lavrova

Synonyms
- Selinum kultiassovii Korovin; Sphaenolobium kultiassovii (Korovin) Pimenov

Genus of plants

Karatavia is a genus of flowering plants belonging to the family Apiaceae. It has only one species, Karatavia kultiassovii, native to Kazakhstan.
