= Yildirimlia =

Scientific classification
- Kingdom: Plantae
- Clade: Tracheophytes
- Clade: Angiosperms
- Clade: Eudicots
- Clade: Asterids
- Order: Apiales
- Family: Apiaceae
- Subfamily: Apioideae
- Tribe: Selineae
- Genus: Yildirimlia; Doğru-Koca
- Species: Y. gracillima

Binomial name
- Yildirimlia gracillima (Leute) Doğru-Koca

Synonyms
- Froriepia gracillima Leute

Monotypic genus of flowering plant

Yildirimlia is a monotypic genus of flowering plant in the family Apiaceae. Its only species is Yildirimlia gracillima, native to Turkey. The genus was established in 2020, for the species originally described as Froriepia gracillima.
