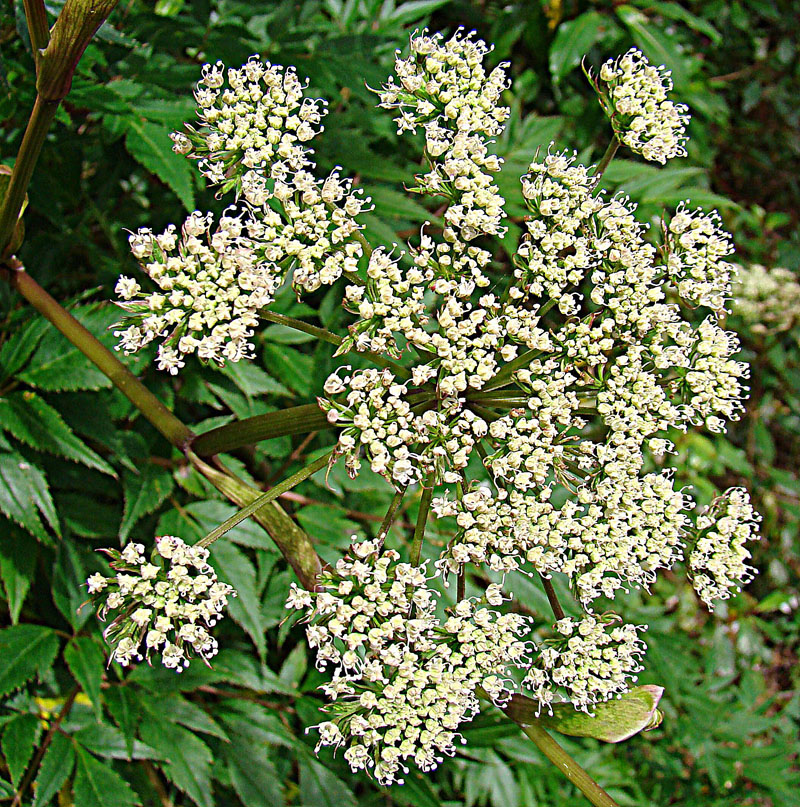
- Myrrhidendron maxonii

Scientific classification
- Kingdom: Plantae
- Clade: Tracheophytes
- Clade: Angiosperms
- Clade: Eudicots
- Clade: Asterids
- Order: Apiales
- Family: Apiaceae
- Subfamily: Apioideae
- Tribe: Selineae
- Genus: Myrrhidendron; J.M.Coult. & Rose

= Myrrhidendron =

Genus of plants

Myrrhidendron is a genus of flowering plants belonging to the family Apiaceae.

Its native range is southeastern Mexico to Ecuador.

== Species ==
Species:

- Myrrhidendron chirripoense Suess.
- Myrrhidendron donnellsmithii J.M.Coult. & Rose
- Myrrhidendron glaucescens (Benth.) J.M.Coult. & Rose
- Myrrhidendron maxonii J.M.Coult. & Rose
- Myrrhidendron pennellii J.M.Coult. & Rose
