= Normantha =

Scientific classification
- Kingdom: Plantae
- Clade: Tracheophytes
- Clade: Angiosperms
- Clade: Eudicots
- Clade: Asterids
- Order: Apiales
- Family: Apiaceae
- Subfamily: Apioideae
- Tribe: Heteromorpheae
- Genus: Normantha; P.J.D.Winter & B.-E.van Wyk
- Species: N. filiformis

Binomial name
- Normantha filiformis P.J.D.Winter

Genus of flowering plants

Normantha is a genus of flowering plants in the family Apiaceae. It includes a single species, Normantha filiformis, a perennial or subshrub native to Angola, Zambia, and southwestern Tanzania.
