= Synclinostyles =

Scientific classification
- Kingdom: Plantae
- Clade: Tracheophytes
- Clade: Angiosperms
- Clade: Eudicots
- Clade: Asterids
- Order: Apiales
- Family: Apiaceae
- Subfamily: Apioideae
- Genus: Synclinostyles; Farille & Lachard

Genus of flowering plants

Synclinostyles is a genus of flowering plants belonging to the family Apiaceae.

Its native range is Himalaya.

Species:

- Synclinostyles denisjordanii Farille & Lachard
- Synclinostyles exadversum Farille & Lachard
