= Pseudotrachydium =

Scientific classification
- Kingdom: Plantae
- Clade: Tracheophytes
- Clade: Angiosperms
- Clade: Eudicots
- Clade: Asterids
- Order: Apiales
- Family: Apiaceae
- Subfamily: Apioideae
- Tribe: Pleurospermeae
- Genus: Pseudotrachydium (Kljuykov, Pimenov & V.N.Tikhom.) Pimenov & Kljuykov

Genus of plants

Pseudotrachydium is a genus of flowering plants belonging to the family Apiaceae.

Its native range is Turkey to Central Asia and Pakistan.

Species:

- Pseudotrachydium depressum (Boiss.) Pimenov & Kljuykov
- Pseudotrachydium dichotomum (Korovin) Pimenov & Kljuykov
- Pseudotrachydium kotschyi (Boiss.) Pimenov & Kljuykov
- Pseudotrachydium pauciradiatum (Boiss. & Hohen.) Pimenov & Kljuykov
- Pseudotrachydium vesiculosoalatum (Rech.f.) Pimenov & Kljuykov
