= Kailashia =

Scientific classification
- Kingdom: Plantae
- Clade: Tracheophytes
- Clade: Angiosperms
- Clade: Eudicots
- Clade: Asterids
- Order: Apiales
- Family: Apiaceae
- Subfamily: Apioideae
- Tribe: Selineae
- Genus: Kailashia; Pimenov & Kljuykov

Genus of plants

Kailashia is a genus of flowering plants belonging to the family Apiaceae.

Its native range is Tibet to Western Himalaya.

Species:

- Kailashia robusta Pimenov & Kljuykov
- Kailashia xizangensis (H.T.Chang & R.H.Shan) Pimenov & Kljuykov
