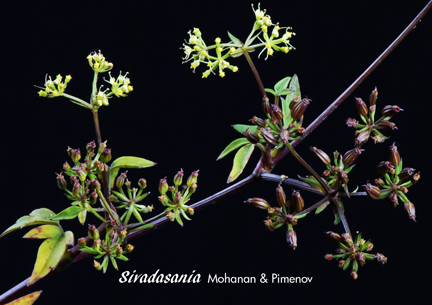

Scientific classification
- Kingdom: Plantae
- Clade: Tracheophytes
- Clade: Angiosperms
- Clade: Eudicots
- Clade: Asterids
- Order: Apiales
- Family: Apiaceae
- Subfamily: Apioideae
- Genus: Sivadasania; N.Mohanan & Pimenov
- Species: S. josephiana

Binomial name
- Sivadasania josephiana (Wadhwa & H.J.Chowdhery) N.Mohanan & Pimenov

Synonyms
- Peucedanum josephianum Wadhwa & H.J.Chowdhery

= Sivadasania =

Genus of flowering plants

Sivadasania is a genus of flowering plants in the family Apiaceae. It includes a single species, Sivadasania josephiana, which is native to southwestern India.
