= Frommia =

Scientific classification
- Kingdom: Plantae
- Clade: Tracheophytes
- Clade: Angiosperms
- Clade: Eudicots
- Clade: Asterids
- Order: Apiales
- Family: Apiaceae
- Subfamily: Apioideae
- Tribe: Pimpinelleae
- Genus: Frommia; H.Wolff
- Species: F. ceratophylloides

Binomial name
- Frommia ceratophylloides H.Wolff

Genus of flowering plants

Frommia is a genus of flowering plants belonging to the family Apiaceae. It has only one species, Frommia ceratophylloides. Its native range is Southern Tanzania to Northeastern Zambia.
