= Lisaea (plant) =

Scientific classification
- Kingdom: Plantae
- Clade: Tracheophytes
- Clade: Angiosperms
- Clade: Eudicots
- Clade: Asterids
- Order: Apiales
- Family: Apiaceae
- Subfamily: Apioideae
- Tribe: Scandiceae
- Subtribe: Torilidinae
- Genus: Lisaea; Boiss.

Species
- See text.

Genus of plants

Lisaea is a genus of flowering plant in the family Apiaceae, native to from the eastern Mediterranean to the western Himalayas. The genus was first described by Pierre Edmond Boissier in 1844.

== Species ==
As of December 2022, Plants of the World Online accepted the following species:

- Lisaea heterocarpa (DC.) Boiss.
- Lisaea papyracea Boiss.
- Lisaea strigosa (Banks & Sol.) Eig
