= Semenovia brunonis =

Scientific classification
- Kingdom: Plantae
- Clade: Tracheophytes
- Clade: Angiosperms
- Clade: Eudicots
- Clade: Asterids
- Order: Apiales
- Family: Apiaceae
- Subfamily: Apioideae
- Tribe: Tordylieae
- Subtribe: Tordyliinae
- Genus: Semenovia
- Species: S. brunonis

Binomial name
- Semenovia brunonis (DC.) X.L.Guo, Q.Y.Xiao & X.J.He

Species of flowering plants

Semenovia brunonis is a species of flowering plants belonging to the genus Semenovia. It was previously placed in its own monotypic genus Tordyliopsis. However, a molecular phylogenetic study shows that it is embedded in the genus Semenovia. In the taxonomic revision to create monophyletic genus, it was transferred to Semenovia. Its native range is Himalaya to Tibet.
