= Cynosciadium =

Scientific classification
- Kingdom: Plantae
- Clade: Tracheophytes
- Clade: Angiosperms
- Clade: Eudicots
- Clade: Asterids
- Order: Apiales
- Family: Apiaceae
- Subfamily: Apioideae
- Tribe: Oenantheae
- Genus: Cynosciadium; DC.

Genus of flowering plants

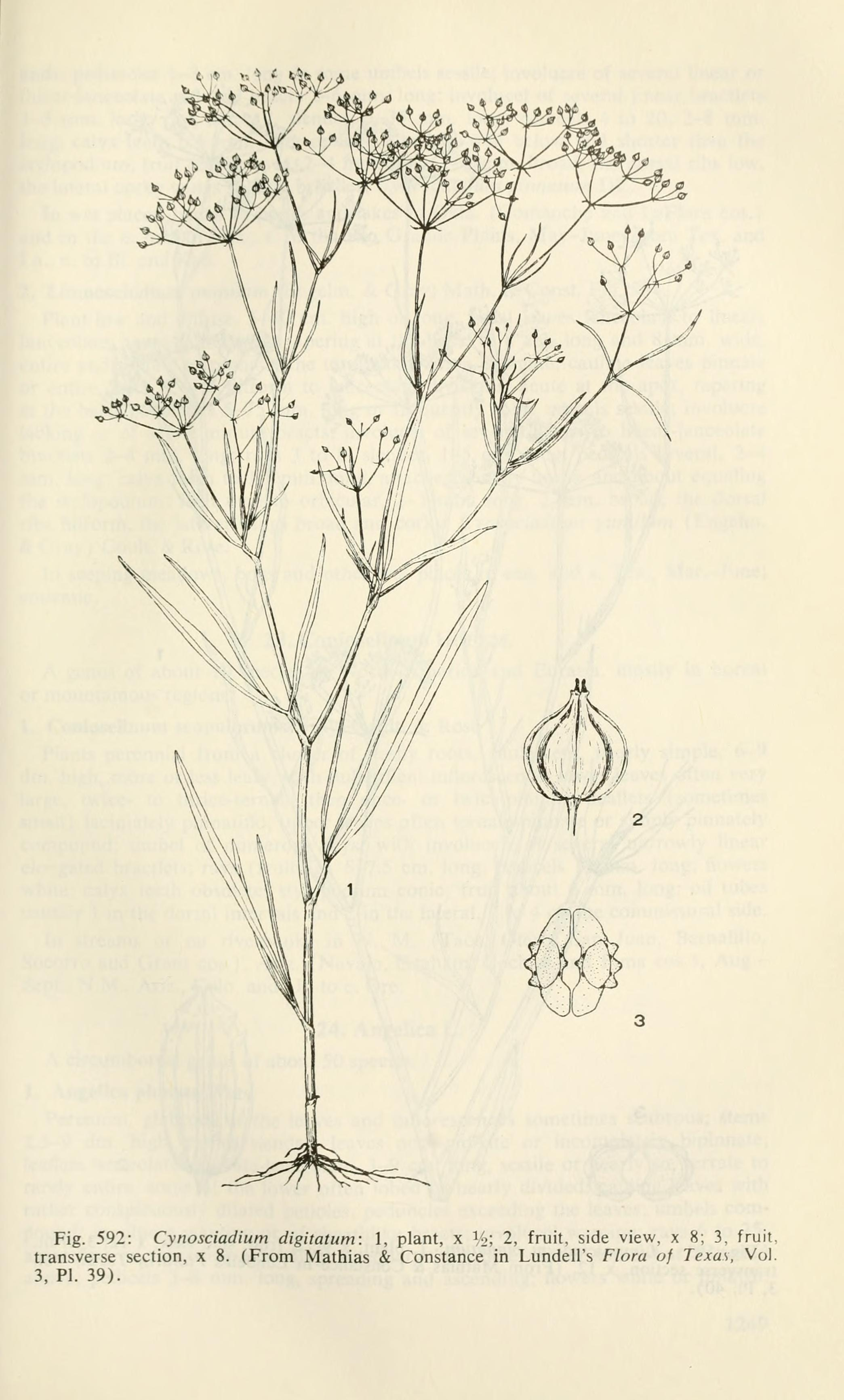
Cynosciadium digitatum, botanical sketch

Cynosciadium is a genus of flowering plants belonging to the family Apiaceae.

Its native range is Southern Central and Southeastern USA.

Species:

- Cynosciadium digitatum DC.
