= Dactylaea =

Scientific classification
- Kingdom: Plantae
- Clade: Tracheophytes
- Clade: Angiosperms
- Clade: Eudicots
- Clade: Asterids
- Order: Apiales
- Family: Apiaceae
- Genus: Dactylaea; Fedde ex H.Wolff

Genus of flowering plants

Dactylaea is a genus of flowering plants belonging to the family Apiaceae.

Its native range is Tibet to Southern Central China.

Species:

- Dactylaea schizopetala (Franch.) Farille
- Dactylaea wolffiana Fedde ex H.Wolff
