= Ormosciadium =

Scientific classification
- Kingdom: Plantae
- Clade: Tracheophytes
- Clade: Angiosperms
- Clade: Eudicots
- Clade: Asterids
- Order: Apiales
- Family: Apiaceae
- Genus: Ormosciadium; Boiss.

Genus of plants

Ormosciadium is a genus of flowering plants belonging to the family Apiaceae.

Its native range is Western Asia.

== Species ==
Species:

- Ormosciadium aucheri Boiss.
