= Tamamschjania =

Scientific classification
- Kingdom: Plantae
- Clade: Tracheophytes
- Clade: Angiosperms
- Clade: Eudicots
- Clade: Asterids
- Order: Apiales
- Family: Apiaceae
- Genus: Tamamschjania; Pimenov & Kljuykov

Genus of flowering plants

Tamamschjania is a genus of flowering plants belonging to the family Apiaceae.

Its native range is Turkey to Caucasus.

Species:

- Tamamschjania lazica (Boiss. & Balansa) Pimenov & Kljuykov
