= Paraselinum =

Scientific classification
- Kingdom: Plantae
- Clade: Tracheophytes
- Clade: Angiosperms
- Clade: Eudicots
- Clade: Asterids
- Order: Apiales
- Family: Apiaceae
- Genus: Paraselinum; H.Wolff

Genus of plants

Paraselinum is a genus of flowering plants belonging to the family Apiaceae.

Its native range is Peru to Bolivia.

Species:

- Paraselinum weberbaueri H.Wolff
