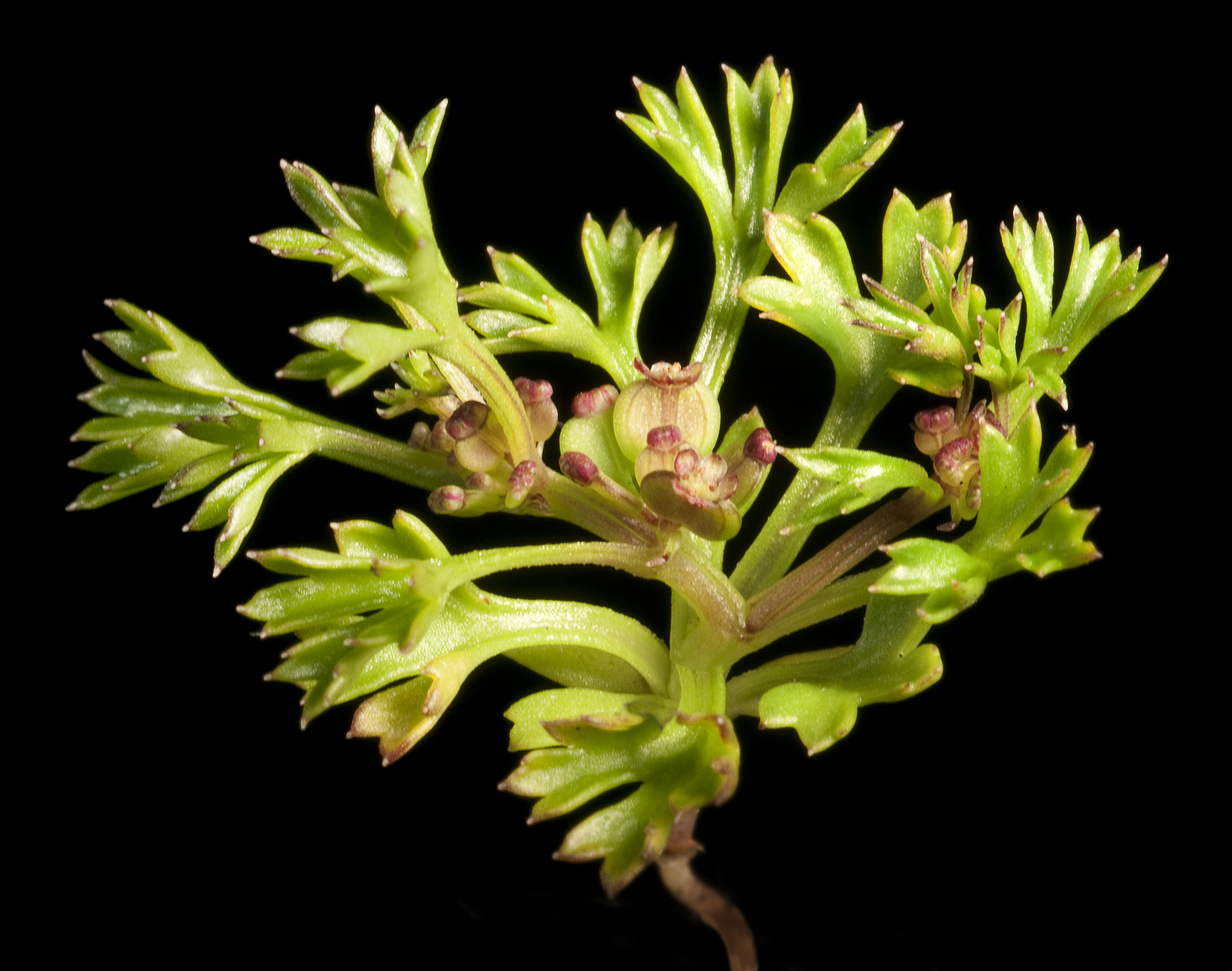
- Homalosciadium homalocarpum

Scientific classification
- Kingdom: Plantae
- Clade: Tracheophytes
- Clade: Angiosperms
- Clade: Eudicots
- Clade: Asterids
- Order: Apiales
- Family: Apiaceae
- Genus: Homalosciadium; Domin

= Homalosciadium =

Genus of plants

Homalosciadium is a genus of flowering plants belonging to the family Apiaceae.

Its native range is Southwestern Australia.

Species:

- Homalosciadium homalocarpum (F.Muell.) H.Eichler
