= Xyloselinum =

Scientific classification
- Kingdom: Plantae
- Clade: Tracheophytes
- Clade: Angiosperms
- Clade: Eudicots
- Clade: Asterids
- Order: Apiales
- Family: Apiaceae
- Genus: Xyloselinum; Pimenov & Kljuykov

Genus of flowering plants

Xyloselinum is a genus of flowering plants in the family Apiaceae.

Its native range is Indo-China.

Species:

- Xyloselinum laoticum Pimenov & Aver.
- Xyloselinum leonidii Pimenov & Kljuykov
- Xyloselinum vietnamense Pimenov & Kljuykov
