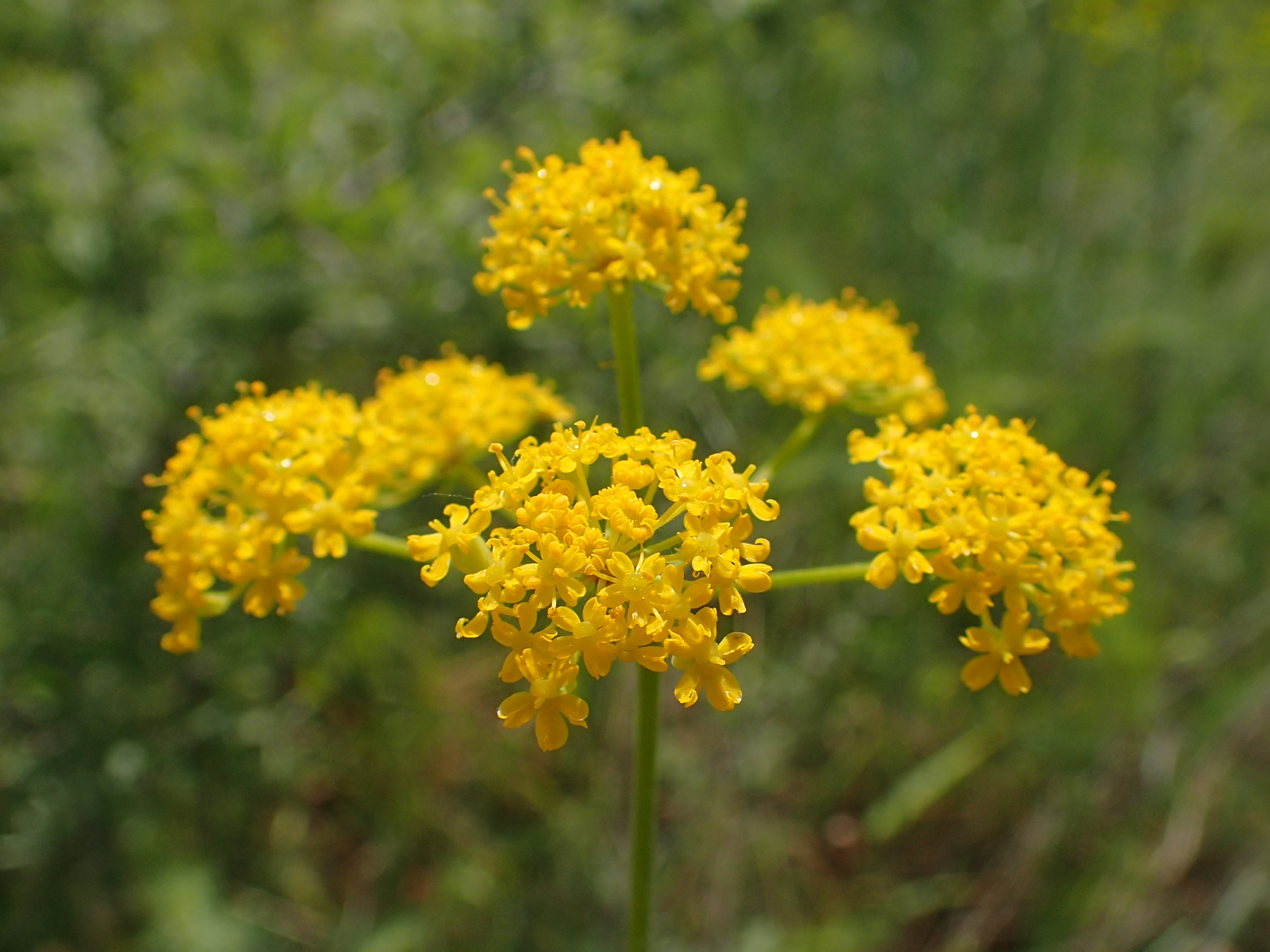
- Leiotulus aureus in plagia near Cherso, Greece

Scientific classification
- Kingdom: Plantae
- Clade: Tracheophytes
- Clade: Angiosperms
- Clade: Eudicots
- Clade: Asterids
- Order: Apiales
- Family: Apiaceae
- Genus: Leiotulus; Ehrenb.

= Leiotulus =

Genus of plants

Leiotulus is a genus of flowering plants belonging to the family Apiaceae.

Its native range is Southern and Eastern Mediterranean to Iran.

Species:

- Leiotulus alexandrinus Ehrenb.
- Leiotulus aureus (Sm.) Pimenov & Ostr.
- Leiotulus dasyanthus (K.Koch) Pimenov & Ostr.
- Leiotulus involucratus (Boiss. & Spruner) Pimenov & Ostr.
- Leiotulus isfahanicus (Alava) Pimenov & Ostr.
- Leiotulus kotschyi (Boiss.) Pimenov & Ostr.
- Leiotulus nydeggeri Yild. & Dinç
- Leiotulus pastinacifolius (Boiss. & Balansa) Pimenov & Ostr.
- Leiotulus porphyrodiscus (Stapf & Wettst.) Pimenov & Ostr.
- Leiotulus secacul (Mill.) Pimenov & Ostr.
