= Dethawia =

Scientific classification
- Kingdom: Plantae
- Clade: Tracheophytes
- Clade: Angiosperms
- Clade: Eudicots
- Clade: Asterids
- Order: Apiales
- Family: Apiaceae
- Genus: Dethawia; Endl.

Genus of plants

Dethawia is a genus of flowering plants belonging to the family Apiaceae.

Its native range is Pyrenees.

Species:

- Dethawia splendens (Lapeyr.) Kerguélen
