= Ergocarpon =

Scientific classification
- Kingdom: Plantae
- Clade: Tracheophytes
- Clade: Angiosperms
- Clade: Eudicots
- Clade: Asterids
- Order: Apiales
- Family: Apiaceae
- Genus: Ergocarpon; C.C.Towns.

Genus of plants

Ergocarpon is a genus of flowering plants belonging to the family Apiaceae.

Its native range is northern Iraq to northwestern Iran.

Species:

- Ergocarpon cryptanthum (Rech.f.) C.C.Towns.
