= Opoidia =

Scientific classification
- Kingdom: Plantae
- Clade: Tracheophytes
- Clade: Angiosperms
- Clade: Eudicots
- Clade: Asterids
- Order: Apiales
- Family: Apiaceae
- Genus: Opoidia; Lindl.
- Species: O. galbanifera

Binomial name
- Opoidia galbanifera Lindl.

Genus of flowering plants

Opoidia is a genus of flowering plants in the family Apiaceae. It includes a single species, Opoidia galbanifera, a perennial endemic to northeastern Iran.
