= Rhopalosciadium =

Scientific classification
- Kingdom: Plantae
- Clade: Tracheophytes
- Clade: Angiosperms
- Clade: Eudicots
- Clade: Asterids
- Order: Apiales
- Family: Apiaceae
- Genus: Rhopalosciadium; Rech.f.

Genus of flowering plants

Rhopalosciadium is a genus of flowering plants belonging to the family Apiaceae.

Its native range is Iran.

Species:

- Rhopalosciadium stereocalyx Rech.f.
