= Kalakia =

Scientific classification
- Kingdom: Plantae
- Clade: Tracheophytes
- Clade: Angiosperms
- Clade: Eudicots
- Clade: Asterids
- Order: Apiales
- Family: Apiaceae
- Genus: Kalakia; Alava
- Species: K. marginata

Binomial name
- Kalakia marginata (Boiss.) Alava

Forms
- Kalakia marginata f. leiocarpa (Bornm. & Gauba) Alava; Kalakia marginata f. marginata

Synonyms
- Cymbocarpum marginatum Boiss.

Genus of flowering plants

Kalakia is a genus of flowering plants in the family Apiaceae. It includes a single species, Kalakia marginata, an annual endemic to Iran.

Two forms are accepted:

- Kalakia marginata f. leiocarpa (Bornm. & Gauba) Alava (synonyms Ducrosia stenocarpa f. leiocarpa Bornm. & Gauba & Kalakia stenocarpa f. leiocarpa (Bornm. & Gauba) Alava)
- Kalakia marginata f. marginata (synonyms Ducrosia stenocarpa Bornm. & Gauba, D. stenocarpa f. hebecarpa Bornm. & Gauba, Kalakia stenocarpa (Bornm. & Gauba) Alava, & K. stenocarpa f. hebecarpa (Bornm. & Gauba) Alava)
