= Villarrealia =

Scientific classification
- Kingdom: Plantae
- Clade: Tracheophytes
- Clade: Angiosperms
- Clade: Eudicots
- Clade: Asterids
- Order: Apiales
- Family: Apiaceae
- Genus: Villarrealia; G.L.Nesom

Genus of flowering plants

Villarrealia is a genus of flowering plants belonging to the family Apiaceae.

Its native range is Mexico.

Species:

- Villarrealia calcicola (Mathias & Constance) G.L.Nesom
