= Tschulaktavia =

Scientific classification
- Kingdom: Plantae
- Clade: Tracheophytes
- Clade: Angiosperms
- Clade: Eudicots
- Clade: Asterids
- Order: Apiales
- Family: Apiaceae
- Genus: Tschulaktavia; Bajtenov ex Pimenov & Kljuykov

Genus of flowering plants

Tschulaktavia is a genus of flowering plants belonging to the family Apiaceae.

Its native range is Central Asia.

Species:

- Tschulaktavia saxatilis (Bajtenov) Bajtenov ex Pimenov & Kljuykov
