= Pastinacopsis =

Scientific classification
- Kingdom: Plantae
- Clade: Tracheophytes
- Clade: Angiosperms
- Clade: Eudicots
- Clade: Asterids
- Order: Apiales
- Family: Apiaceae
- Genus: Pastinacopsis; Golosk.

Genus of plants

Pastinacopsis is a genus of flowering plants belonging to the family Apiaceae.

Its native range is Central Asia to Xinjiang.

Species:

- Pastinacopsis glacialis Golosk.
