= Sclerochorton =

Scientific classification
- Kingdom: Plantae
- Clade: Tracheophytes
- Clade: Angiosperms
- Clade: Eudicots
- Clade: Asterids
- Order: Apiales
- Family: Apiaceae
- Genus: Sclerochorton; Boiss.
- Species: S. haussknechtii

Binomial name
- Sclerochorton haussknechtii Boiss.

Genus of plants

Sclerochorton is a monotypic genus of flowering plants belonging to the family Apiaceae. The only species is Sclerochorton haussknechtii.

Its native range is Iraq to Western Iran.
