= Scrithacola =

Scientific classification
- Kingdom: Plantae
- Clade: Tracheophytes
- Clade: Angiosperms
- Clade: Eudicots
- Clade: Asterids
- Order: Apiales
- Family: Apiaceae
- Genus: Scrithacola; Alava
- Species: S. kurramensis

Binomial name
- Scrithacola kurramensis (Kitam.) Alava

Genus of plants

Scrithacola is a monotypic genus of flowering plants belonging to the family Apiaceae. The only species is Scrithacola kurramensis.

Its native range is Afghanistan to Pakistan.
