= Tricholaser =

Scientific classification
- Kingdom: Plantae
- Clade: Tracheophytes
- Clade: Angiosperms
- Clade: Eudicots
- Clade: Asterids
- Order: Apiales
- Family: Apiaceae
- Genus: Tricholaser; Gilli

Genus of flowering plants

Tricholaser is a genus of flowering plants belonging to the family Apiaceae.

Its native range is Afghanistan to Western Himalaya.

Species:

- Tricholaser cachemiricum (C.B.Clarke) Alava
- Tricholaser ovatilobum (Dunn & R.S.Williams) Alava
