= Vinogradovia =

Scientific classification
- Kingdom: Plantae
- Clade: Tracheophytes
- Clade: Angiosperms
- Clade: Eudicots
- Clade: Asterids
- Order: Apiales
- Family: Apiaceae
- Genus: Vinogradovia; Bani, D.A.German & M.A.Koch

Genus of flowering plants

Vinogradovia is a genus of flowering plants belonging to the family Apiaceae.

Its native range is Turkey.

Species:

- Vinogradovia conferta (Hub.-Mor. & Lamond) Bani, D.A.German & M.A.Koch
