= Leutea =

Scientific classification
- Kingdom: Plantae
- Clade: Tracheophytes
- Clade: Angiosperms
- Clade: Eudicots
- Clade: Asterids
- Order: Apiales
- Family: Apiaceae
- Genus: Leutea; Pimenov (1987)

Species
- 10; see text

Genus of flowering plants

Leutea is a genus of flowering plants in the carrot family, Apiaceae. It includes ten species native to Iraq, Iran, and Turkmenistan.

The genus was described by Michael Georgievich Pimenov in 1987.

== Species ==
Ten species are accepted.

- Leutea avicennae Mozaff. – Iran
- Leutea gracillima Pimenov – northern Iran
- Leutea kurdistanica Mozaff. – Iran
- Leutea nematoloba (Rech.f.) Pimenov – northern Iran
- Leutea petiolaris (DC.) Pimenov – Iran
- Leutea polyscias (Boiss.) Pimenov – northern Iran
- Leutea rechingeri (Leute) Pimenov – northern Iraq
- Leutea sclerophylla (Boiss. & Hausskn.) V.M.Vinogr. – Iran
- Leutea translucens (Rech.f.) Akhani & Salimian – northern Iran
- Leutea turcomanica (Schischk.) V.M.Vinogr. – southern Turkmenistan
