= Taeniopetalum =

Scientific classification
- Kingdom: Plantae
- Clade: Tracheophytes
- Clade: Angiosperms
- Clade: Eudicots
- Clade: Asterids
- Order: Apiales
- Family: Apiaceae
- Genus: Taeniopetalum; Vis.

Genus of flowering plants

Taeniopetalum is a genus of flowering plants belonging to the family Apiaceae.

Its native range is Eastern Central and Southeastern Europe to Turkey.

Species:

- Taeniopetalum arenarium (Waldst. & Kit.) V.N.Tikhom.
- Taeniopetalum obtusifolium (Sm.) Pimenov
