= Pseudoselinum =

Scientific classification
- Kingdom: Plantae
- Clade: Tracheophytes
- Clade: Angiosperms
- Clade: Eudicots
- Clade: Asterids
- Order: Apiales
- Family: Apiaceae
- Genus: Pseudoselinum; C.Norman
- Species: P. angolense

Binomial name
- Pseudoselinum angolense (C.Norman) C.Norman

Synonyms
- Selinum angolense C.Norman

Genus of plants

Pseudoselinum is a monotypic genus of flowering plants belonging to the family Apiaceae. Its only species is Pseudoselinum angolense, native to Angola.
