= Physotrichia =

Scientific classification
- Kingdom: Plantae
- Clade: Tracheophytes
- Clade: Angiosperms
- Clade: Eudicots
- Clade: Asterids
- Order: Apiales
- Family: Apiaceae
- Genus: Physotrichia; Hiern

Synonyms
- Spuriodaucus C.Norman

Genus of plants

Physotrichia is a genus of flowering plants belonging to the family Apiaceae.

Its native range is Tanzania to Southern Tropical Africa.

Species:

- Physotrichia atropurpurea (C.Norman) Cannon
- Physotrichia heracleoides H.Wolff
- Physotrichia longiradiatum H.Wolff
- Physotrichia muriculata (Welw. ex Hiern) S.Droop & C.C.Towns.
- Physotrichia verdickii C.Norman
- Physotrichia welwitschii Hiern
