= Thamnosciadium =

Scientific classification
- Kingdom: Plantae
- Clade: Tracheophytes
- Clade: Angiosperms
- Clade: Eudicots
- Clade: Asterids
- Order: Apiales
- Family: Apiaceae
- Genus: Thamnosciadium; Hartvig

Genus of flowering plants

Thamnosciadium is a genus of flowering plants belonging to the family Apiaceae.

Its native range is Greece and is usually found in dry and subalpine (higher slopes) meadows, and stony slopes. A previous name for Thamnosciadum was "Beta nana, Carum graecum, Origanum scabrum and Seseli stylare", which was discovered by Botanist Theodor von Heldrich in the nineteenth century. The genus is currently being used for testing in essential oils for fragrance levels research.

Species:

- Thamnosciadium junceum (Sm.) Hartvig
