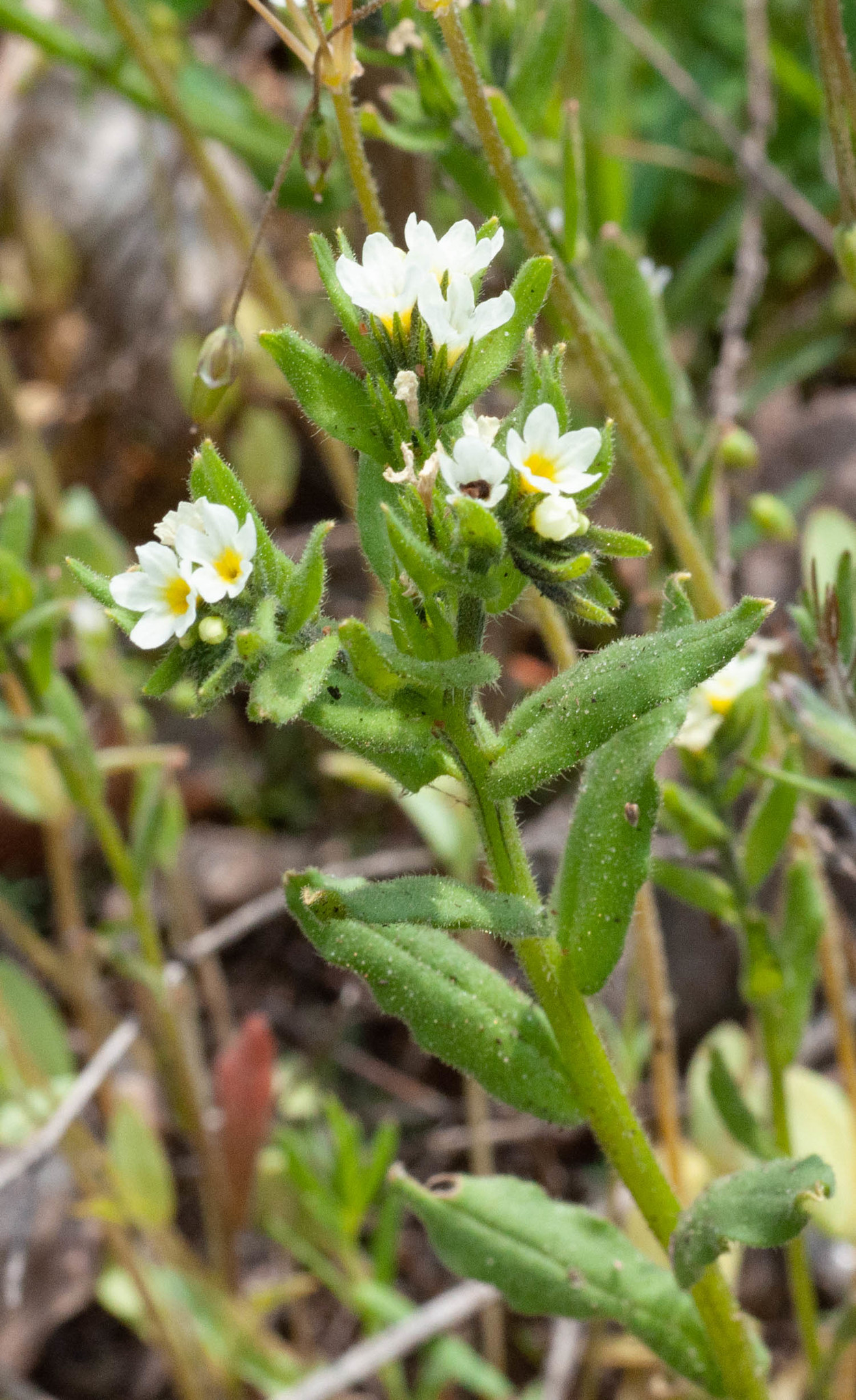
- On Khortytsia island

Scientific classification
- Kingdom: Plantae
- Clade: Tracheophytes
- Clade: Angiosperms
- Clade: Eudicots
- Clade: Asterids
- Order: Boraginales
- Family: Boraginaceae
- Genus: Buglossoides
- Species: B. czernjajevii

Binomial name
- Buglossoides czernjajevii (Klokov & Des.-Shost.) Czerep.

Synonyms
- Lithospermum czernjajevii Klokov & Des.-Shost.

= Buglossoides czernjajevii =

Species of flowering plant

Buglossoides czernjajevii is a species of flowering plant in the family Boraginaceae, native to Moldova and Ukraine. A rare plant known from only ten locations, it is found on forest edges, in glades, and on grassy slopes.
