= Zhobia =

Scientific classification
- Kingdom: Plantae
- Clade: Tracheophytes
- Clade: Angiosperms
- Clade: Eudicots
- Clade: Asterids
- Order: Apiales
- Family: Apiaceae
- Subfamily: Apioideae
- Tribe: Komarovieae
- Genus: Zhobia; A.Sultan, N.Khan, Kljuykov & Lyskov
- Species: Z. glabra

Binomial name
- Zhobia glabra A.Sultan, N.Khan, Kljuykov & Lyskov

Genus of flowering plants

Zhobia is a genus of flowering plants in the family Apiaceae. It includes a single species, Zhobia glabra, a perennial herb endemic to Pakistan. The species is known only from Zhob District of northern Baluchistan, where it grows on rocky slopes at approximately 2000 meters elevation with Sophora mollis and species of Eremostachys, Ephedra, Pistacia, Caragana, Cotoneaster, and grasses.

The genus and species were first described in 2024. The authors placed the genus in tribe Komarovieae on phylogenetic and morphological evidence. It is closely related to Parasilaus, and differs in leaf lobe shape (linear to linear-lanceolate vs. obovate), number of bracts (few linear bracts vs. absent bracts), corolla color (white vs. yellow), compression of fruits (dorsally compressed vs. laterally compressed), number of vallecular secretory ducts (1–2 vs. 3–4), presence of secondary ribs (present vs. absent), and the shape of the endosperm from the commissural side (broad and shallow grooved vs. broad and deep-grooved).
