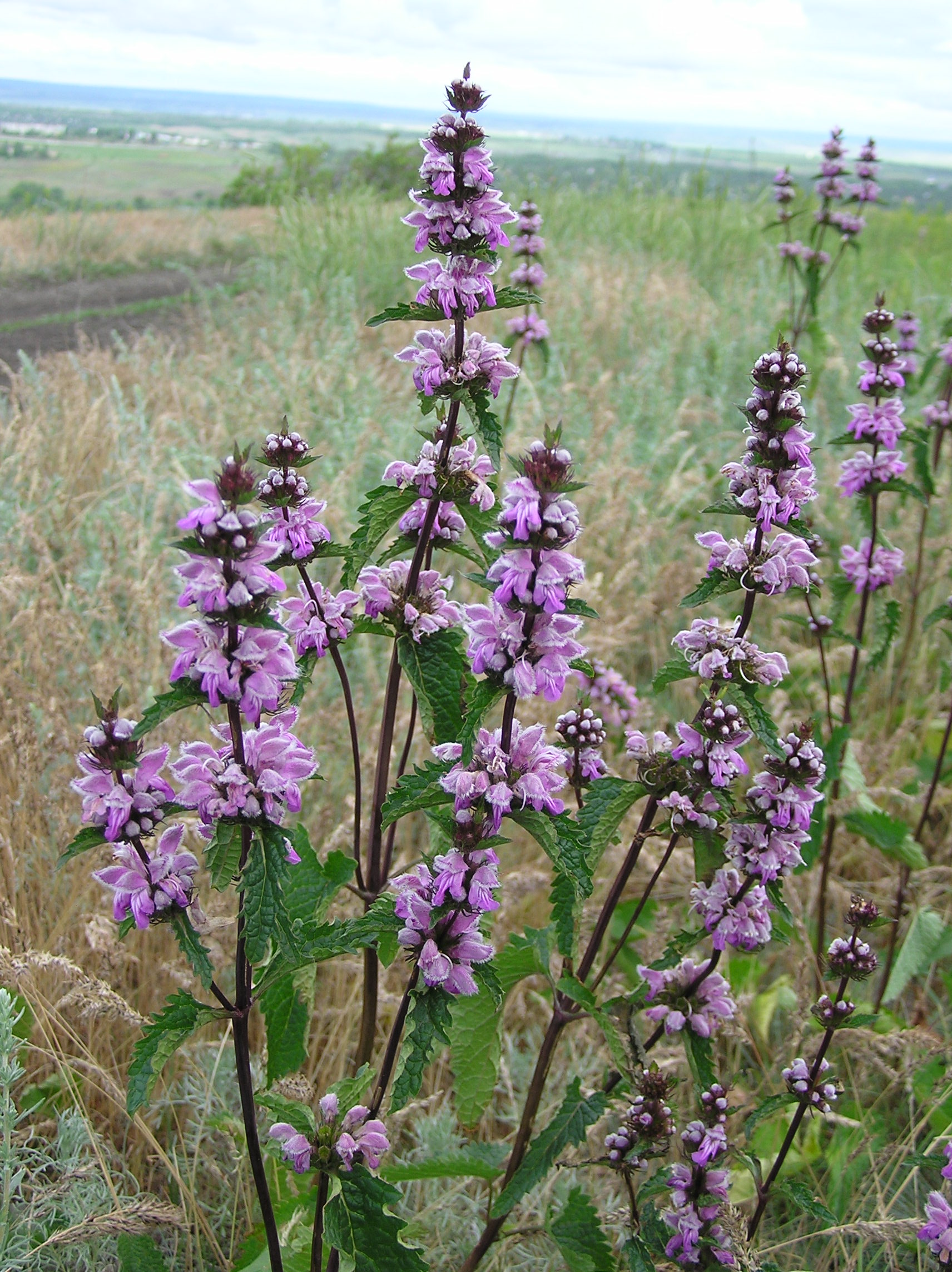

Scientific classification
- Kingdom: Plantae
- Clade: Tracheophytes
- Clade: Angiosperms
- Clade: Eudicots
- Clade: Asterids
- Order: Lamiales
- Family: Lamiaceae
- Genus: Phlomoides
- Species: P. tuberosa

Binomial name
- Phlomoides tuberosa (L.) Moench

Synonyms
- Synonymy: Orlowia rossica Gueldenst. ex Georgi; Phlomidopsis tuberosa (L.) Link; Phlomis desertorum P.A. Smirn.; Phlomis glandulifera Klokov; Phlomis hypanica Des.-Shost.; Phlomis jailicola Klokov; Phlomis maeotica Des.-Shost.; Phlomis piskunovii Klokov; Phlomis scythica Klokov & Des.-Shost.; Phlomis stepposa Klokov; Phlomis tuberosa L.; Phlomis tuberosa var. discolor K.Koch; Phlomitis tuberosa (L.) Rchb. ex T.Nees; Phlomoides desertorum (P.A. Smirn.) Mavrodiev & Sukhor.; Trambis tuberosa (L.) Raf.

= Phlomoides tuberosa =

Species of flowering plant

Phlomoides tuberosa (syn. Phlomis tuberosa), the sage-leaf mullein, is a perennial herbaceous flowering plant in the family Lamiaceae, native to China, Kazakhstan, Kyrgyzstan, Mongolia, Russia, south west Asia and Europe. Enlarged, tuberous roots give rise to erect stems to 150 cm bearing purple-red flowers.

== Chemistry ==
Phytochemical analyses of Phlomoides tuberosa leaves have found flavonoids apigenin, apigenin-7-O-glucuronide, luteolin, luteolin-7-O-glucoside, luteolin-7-О-glucuronide, orientin, isoorientin, phenylpropanoids acteoside (verbascoside), forsythoside B, decaffeoyl-acteoside, leucosceptoside A, marthynoside, neolignanes, iridoids sesamoside, 5-desoxy-sesamoside, shanzhiside methyl ester, lamalbide, 8-O-acetyl-shanzhiside, phloyoside I, chlorotuberoside, sterols, triterpenes oleanolic acid, ursolic acid. Dried leaves of plants collected in Buryatia yielded 0.02% of essential oil with a weak aroma with dominant phytol, linalool, eugenol and caryophyllene oxide. The seed has yielded 11.8% of oil, including 3.3% gadoleic acid and some fatty acids containing the unusual allene group, 25.1% laballenic acid and 2.9% phlomic acid. The roots shown the presence of oligosaccharides raffinose, stachyose, verbascose, flavonoids luteolin, linarin, quercitrin, phenylpropanoids acteoside, isoacteoside (isoverbascoside), forsythoside B, chlorogenic acid, decaffeoyl-acteosyde, iridoids shazhiside methyl ester, 8-O-acetyl-shanzhiside methyl ester, 8-O-acetyl-shanzhigenin methyl ester, floyoside I, phlotuberosides I and II, phlorigidoside C, diterpenes (abietanes, labdanes).

== Cultivation ==
This plant is grown in full sun, but may tolerate some shade. The cultivar 'Amazone' has won the Royal Horticultural Society's Award of Garden Merit.

== Uses ==
The Kalmyks are said to have eaten the cooked root, calling the plant bodmon sok. Another source for Mongolia has the plant used as a folk restorative medicine against intoxication, tuberculosis, pulmonary and cardiovascular diseases and rheumatoid arthritis. Buryat lamas used some part of the plant to treat diarrhoea, eye and lung disease and as a sedative.

== Gallery ==
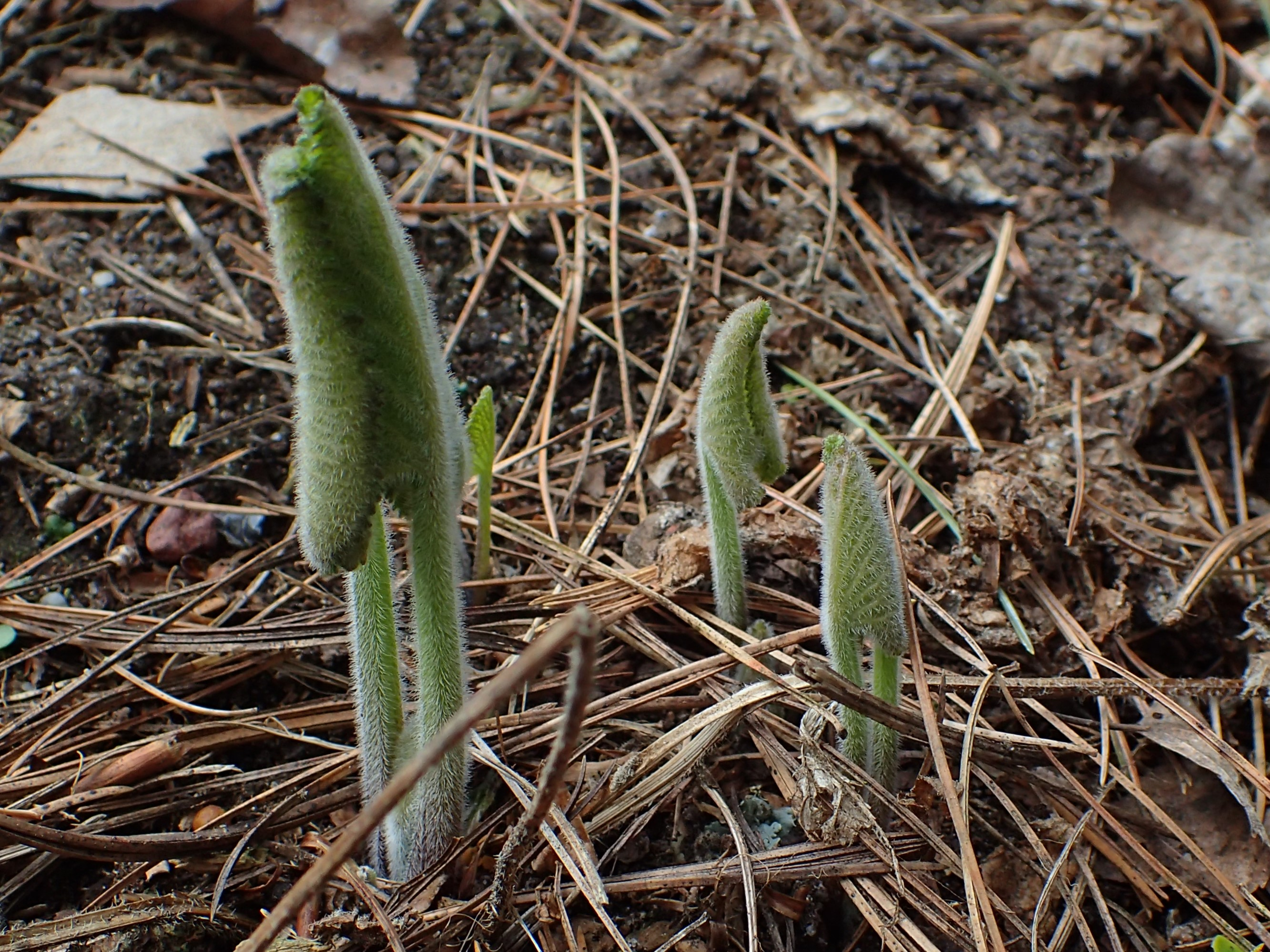
Densely pubescent Spring shoots emerging from the soil among remains of previous season's growth

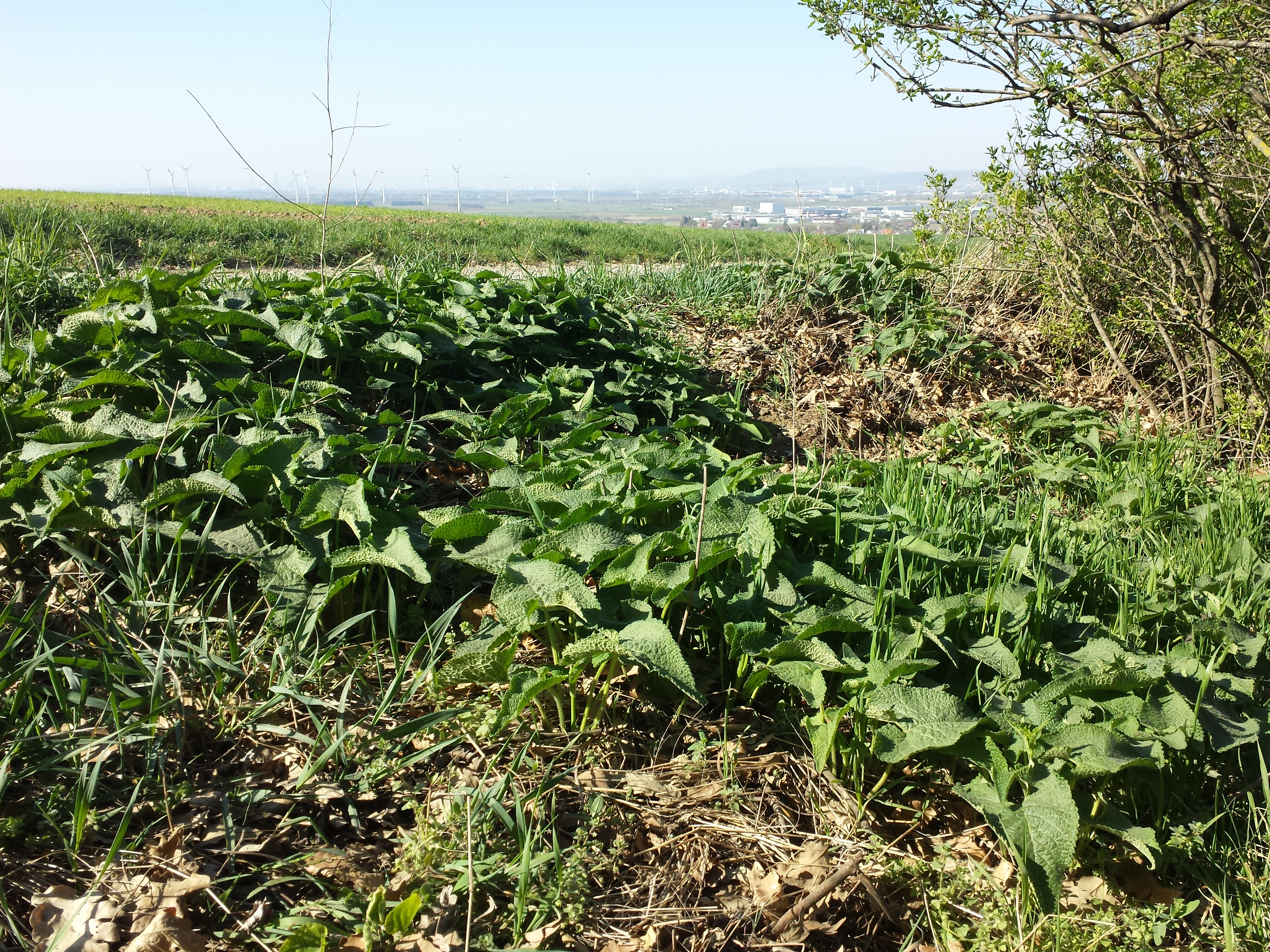
Basal rosettes of a stand of plants in Spring, forest margin, Austria

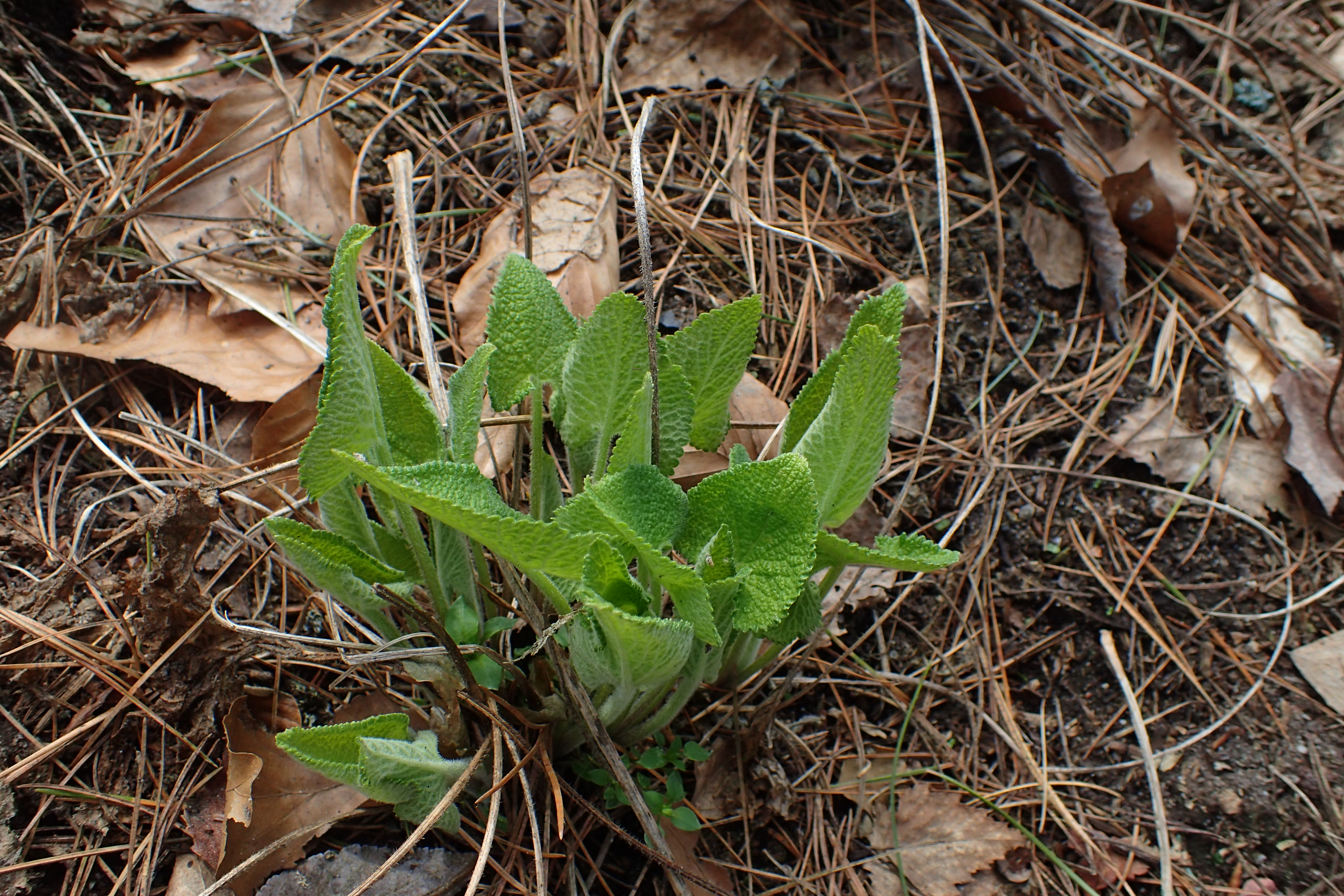
Single, basal rosette of Spring foliage

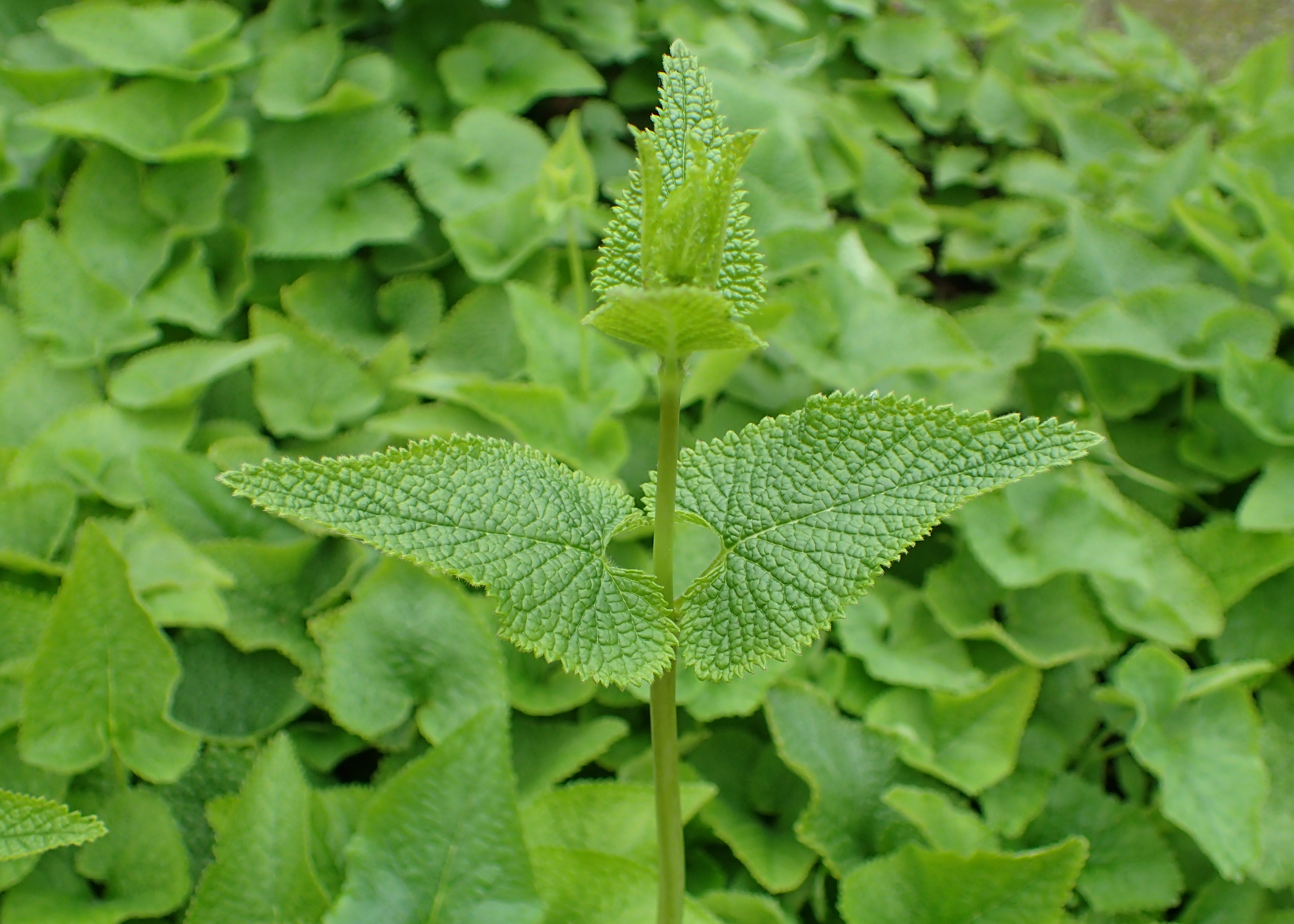
Elongating flowering stem before development of inflorescence

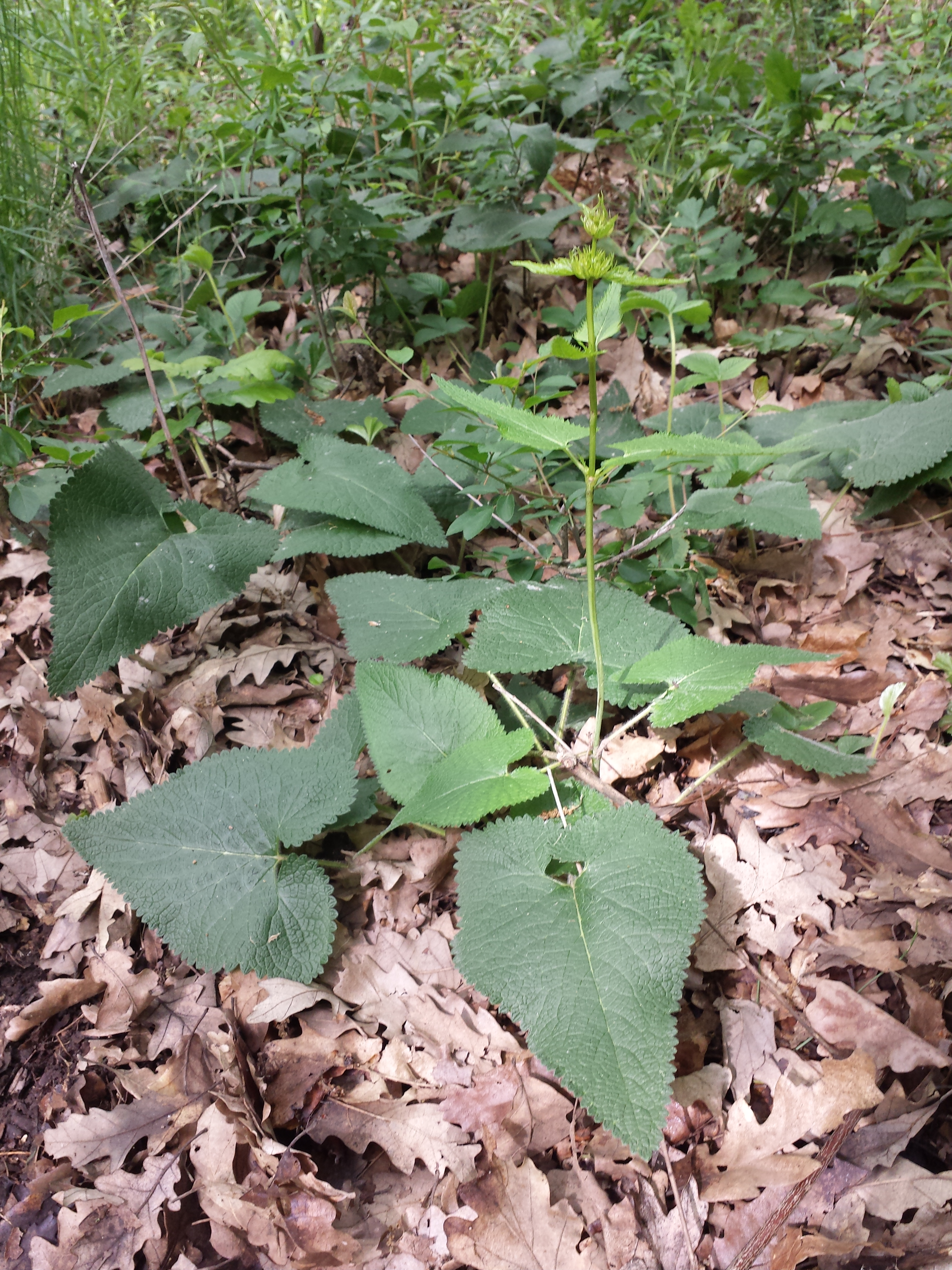
Flowering stem arising from basal rosette of foliage showing inflorescence at early stage of development

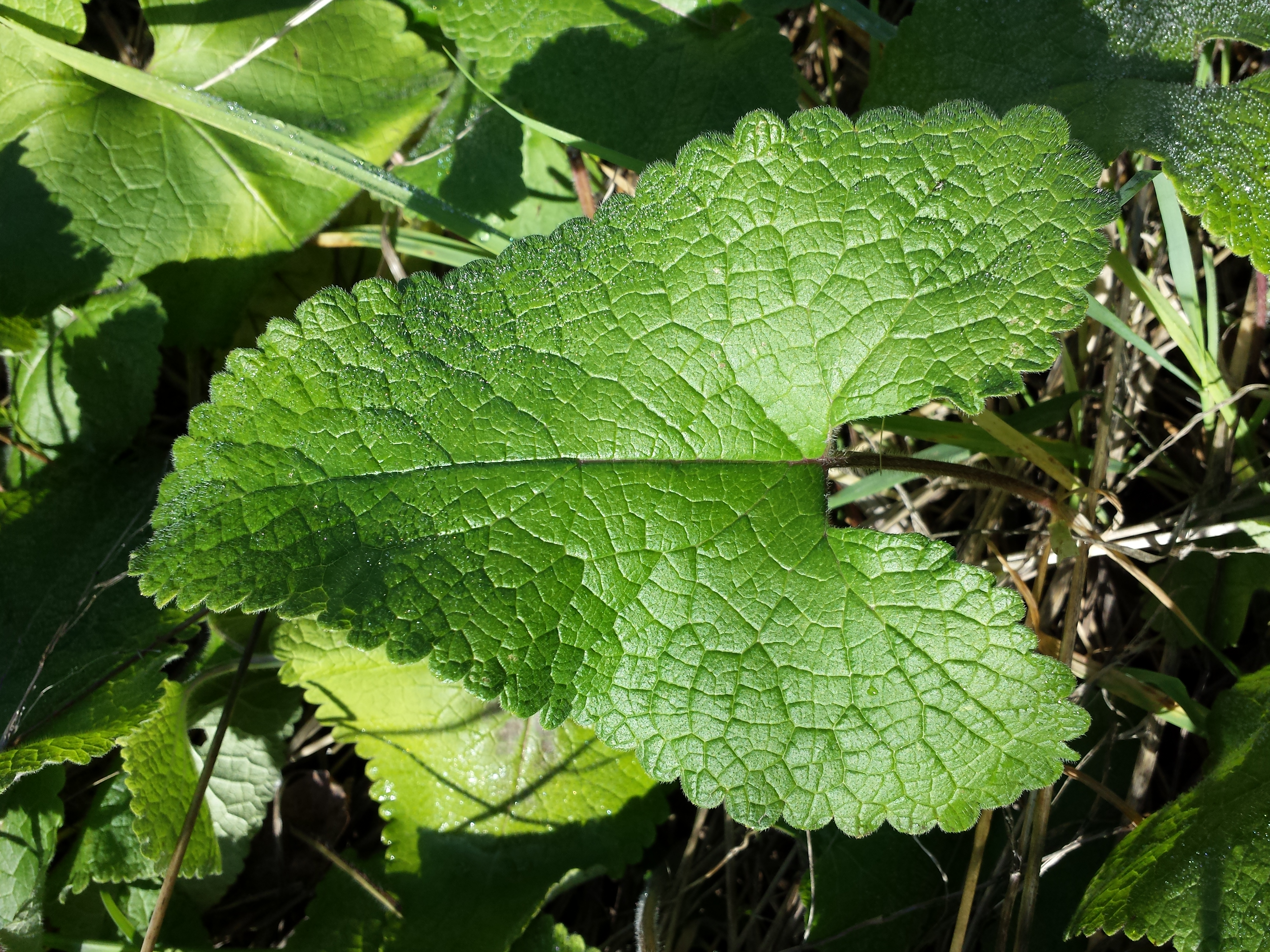
Detail of single cordate basal leaf

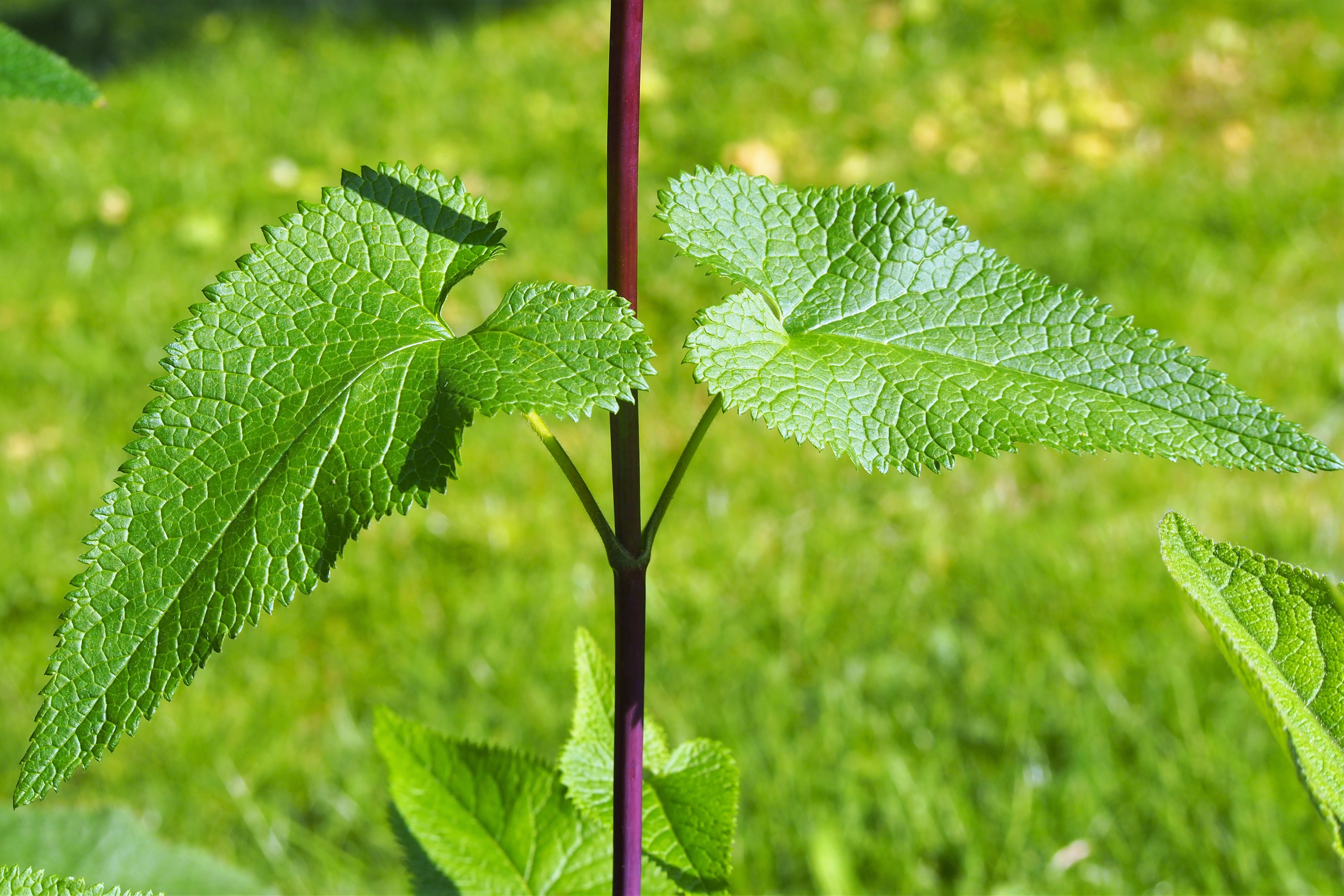
Paired, opposite, cauline leaves at a stem node

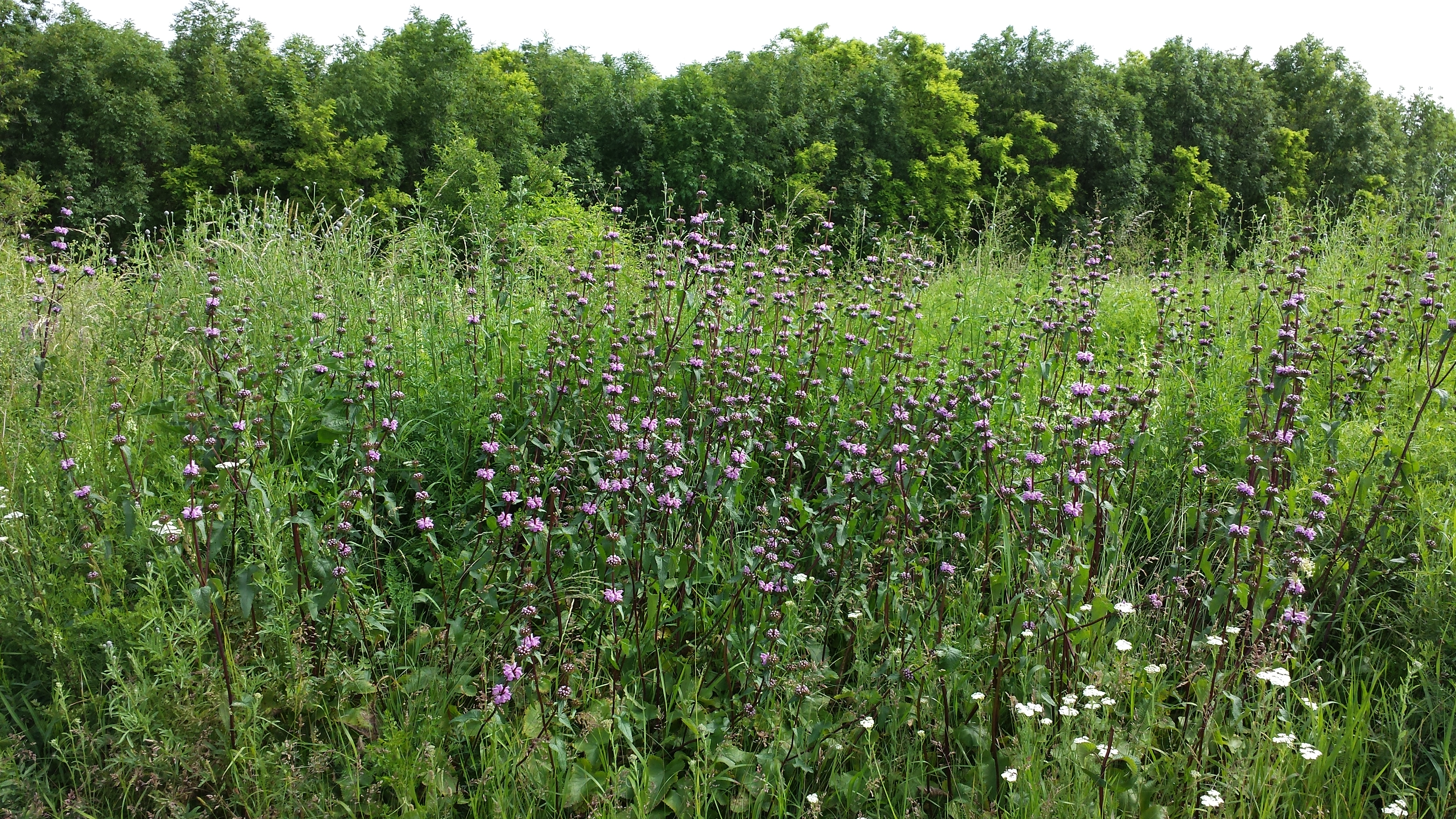
Stand of flowering plants in a tall-herb meadow, lower Austria

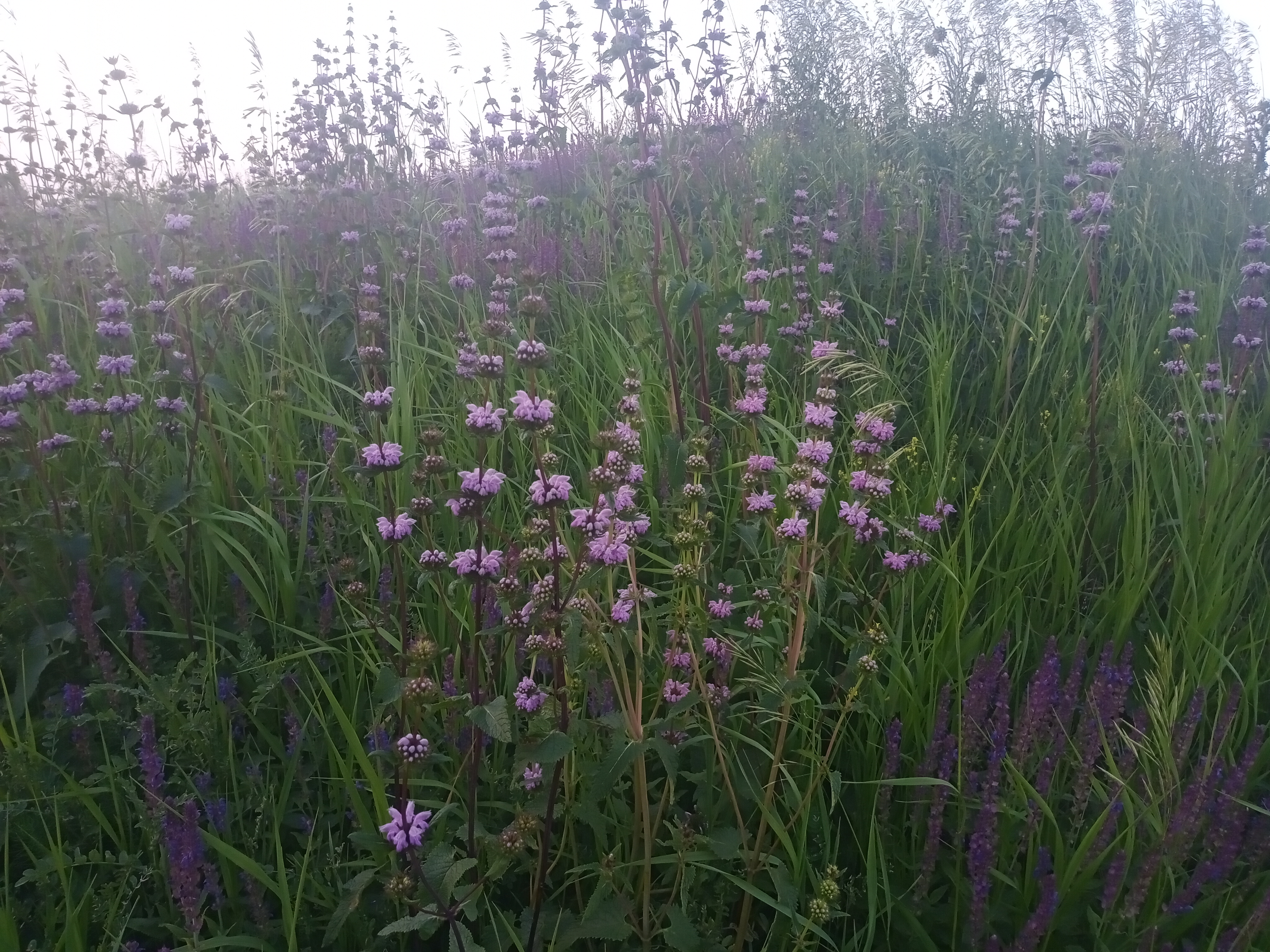
Stand of plants in flower in a tall-herb meadow, Ukraine

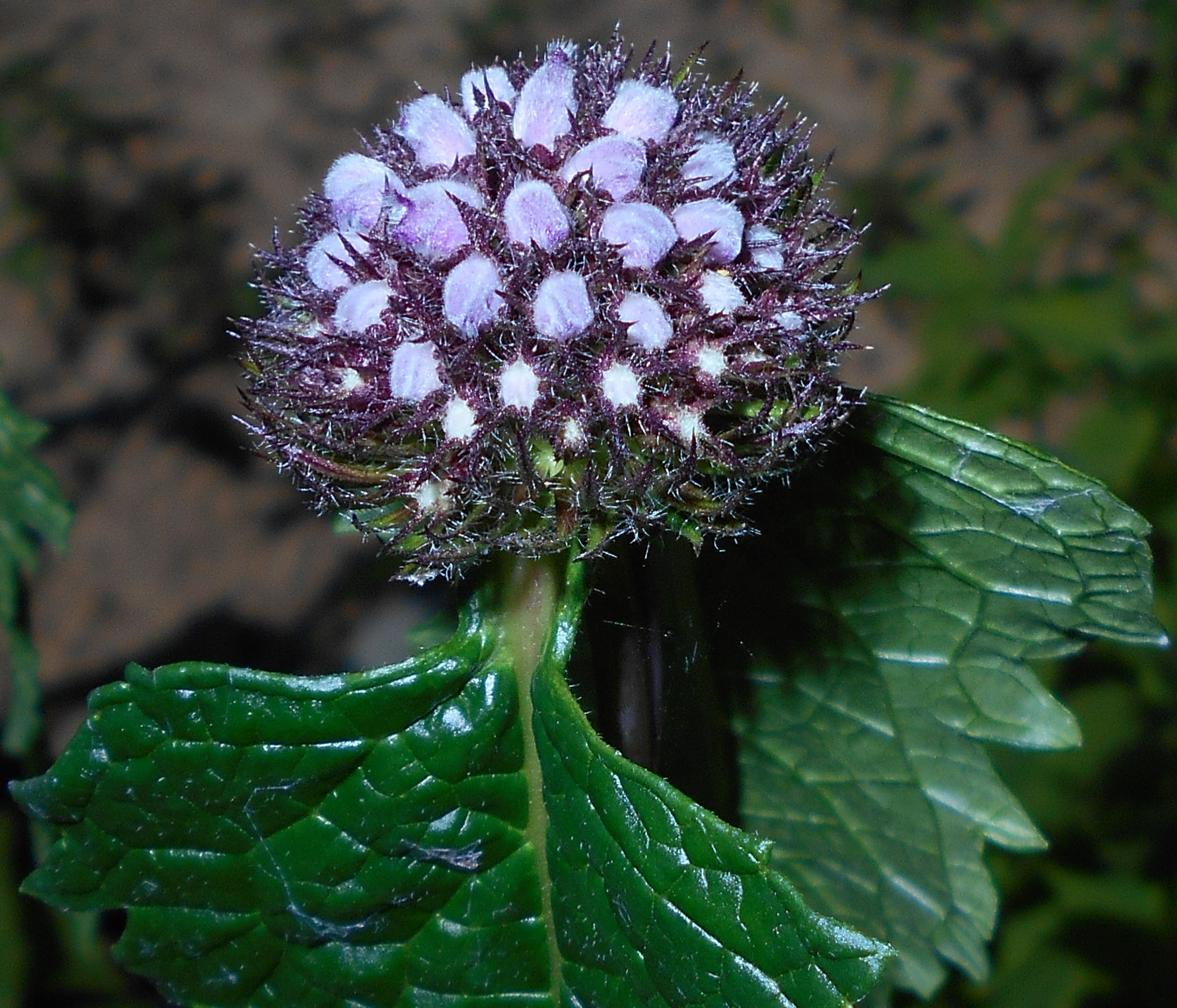
Detail of inflorescence in bud

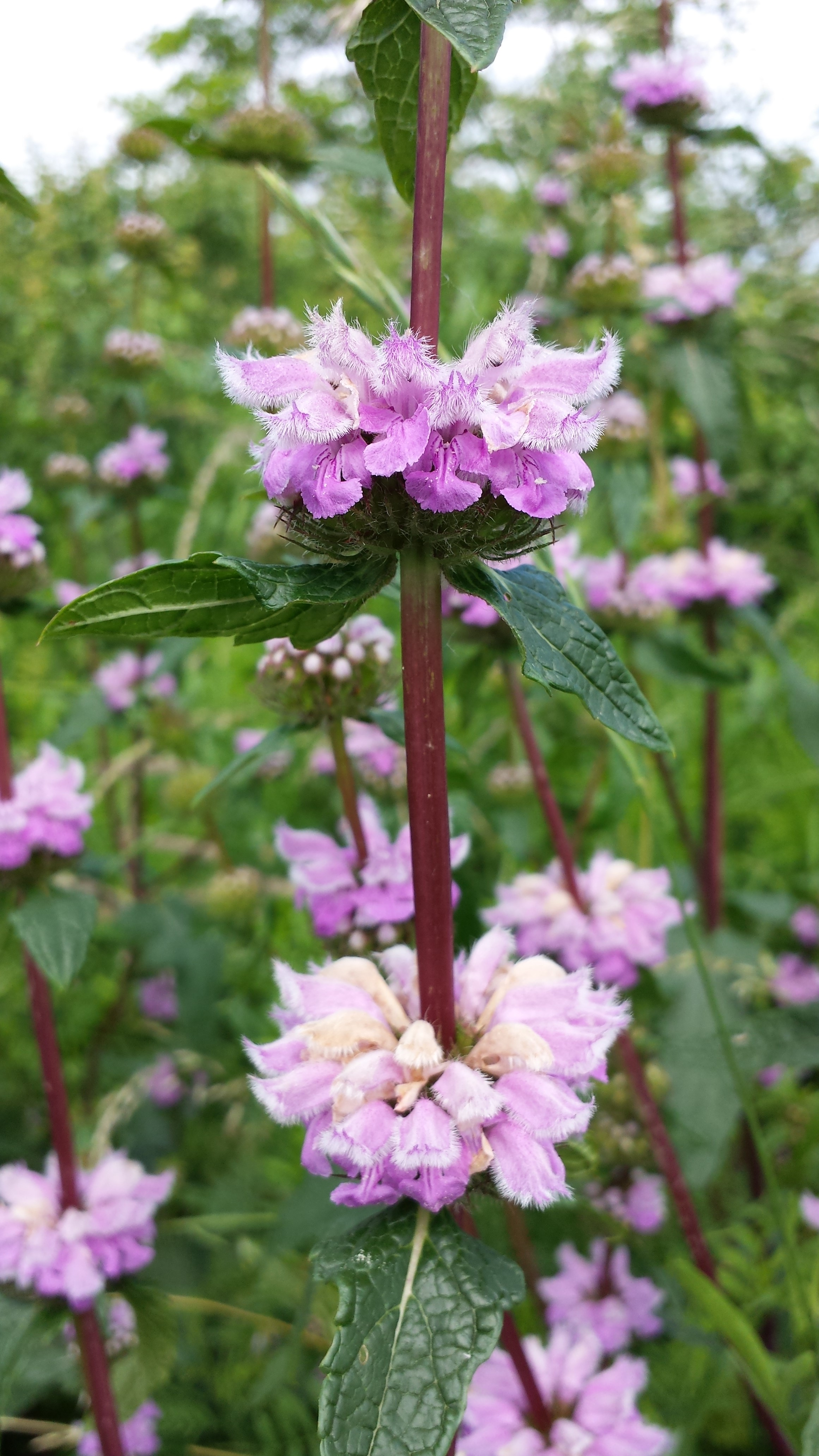
Detail of inflorescence

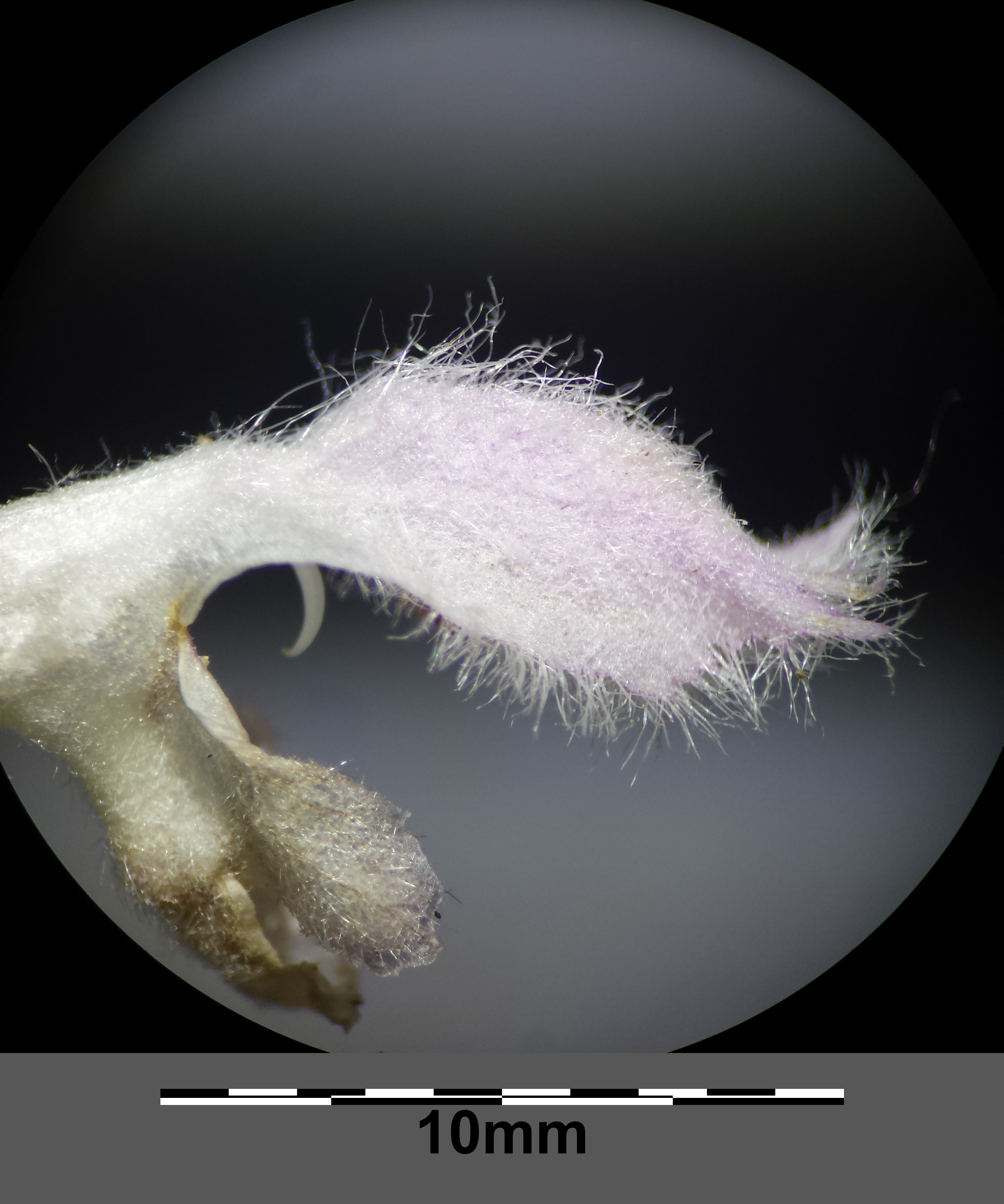
Single flower, showing ciliate upper lip of corolla

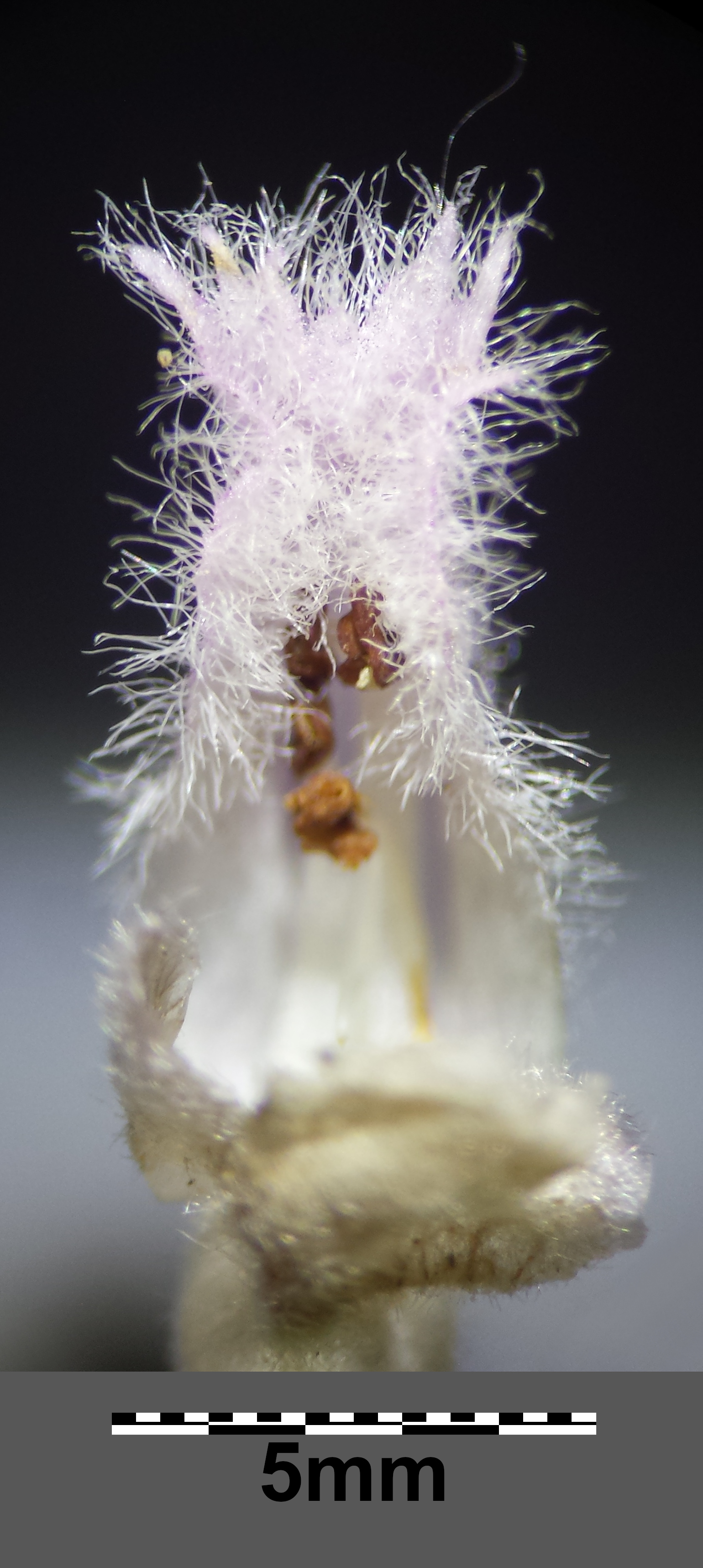
Ciliate upper lip of corolla viewed from beneath to show stamens

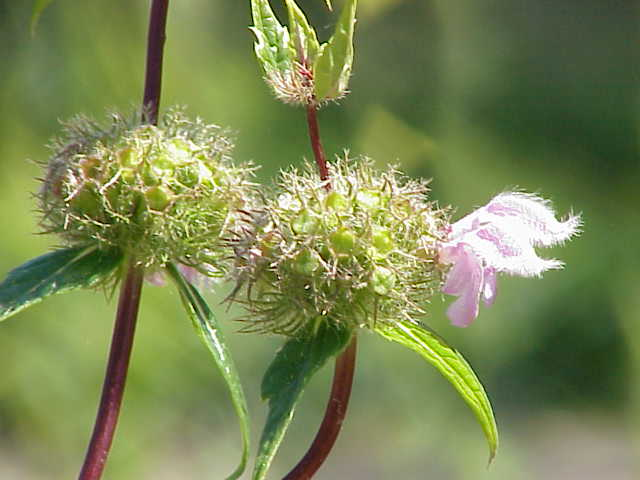
Detail of unripe infructescence

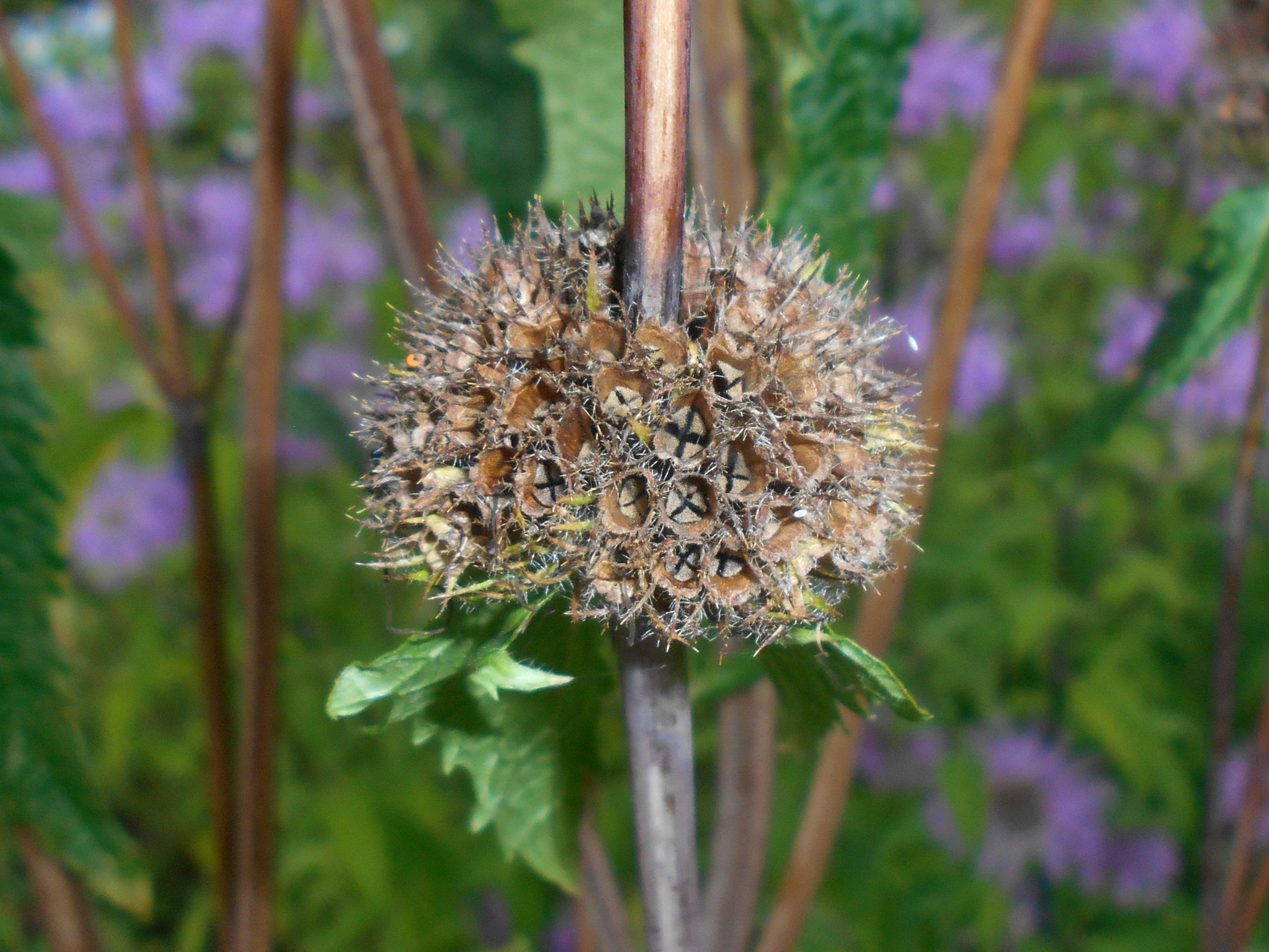
Detail of ripe infructescence showing the four nutlets in each fruiting calyx

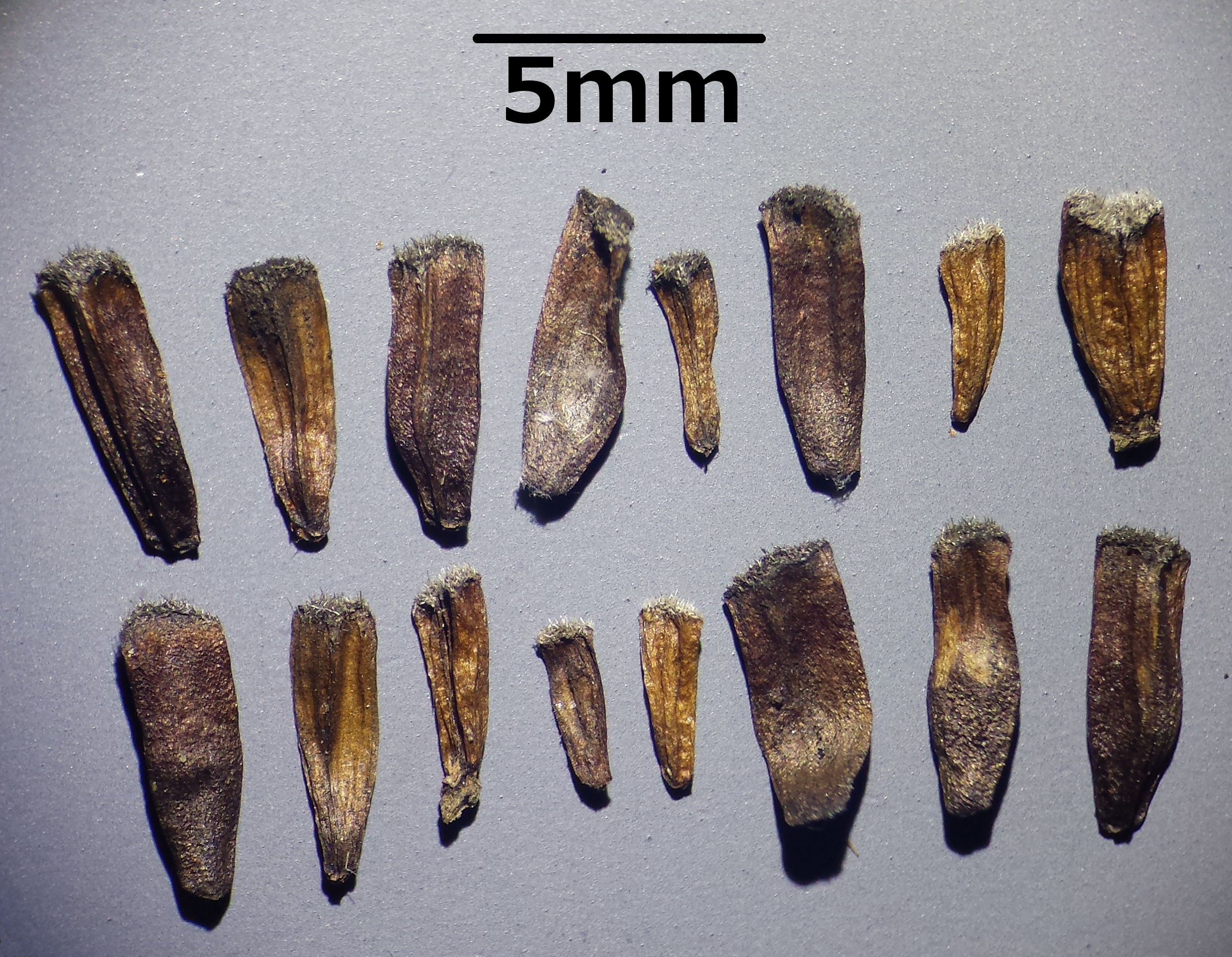
Array of ripe fruits (nutlets) separated from their fruiting calyces

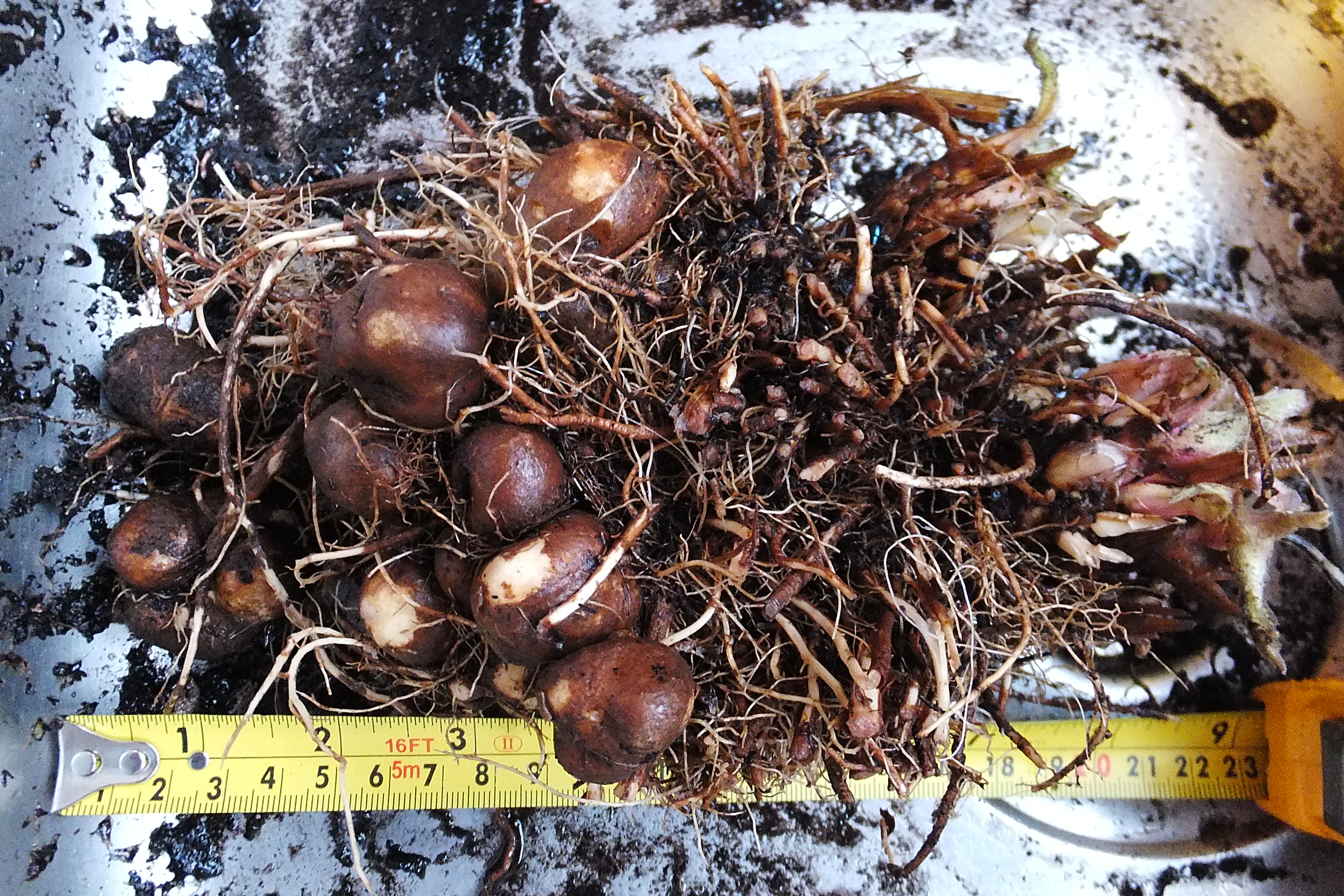
Edible tuberous roots: Kalmyk: bodmon sok
