= Forsythoside B =

Chemical compound

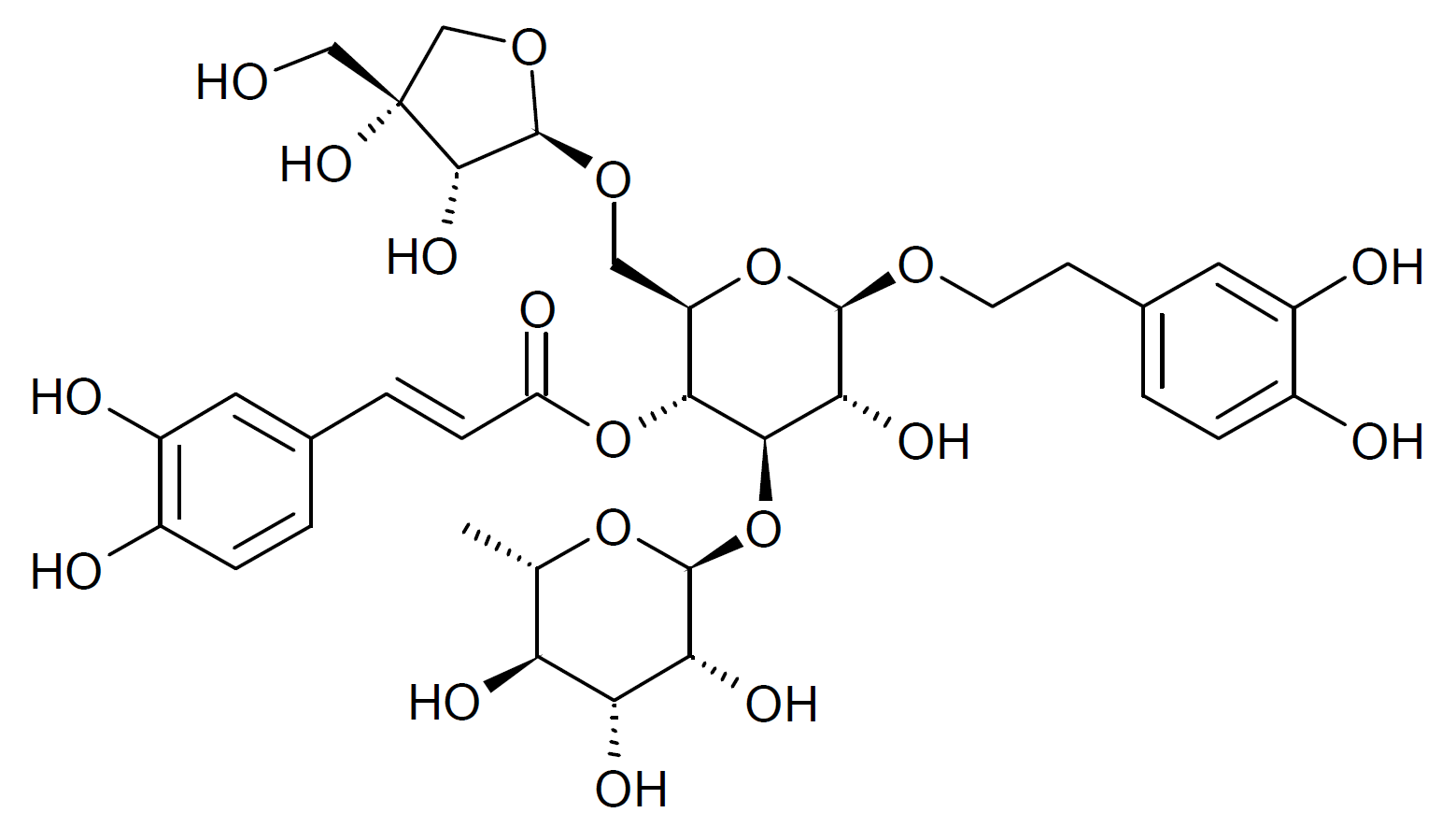

Identifiers
- IUPAC name: [(2R,3R,4R,5R,6R)-2-[[(2R,3R,4R)-3,4-dihydroxy-4-(hydroxymethyl)oxolan-2-yl]oxymethyl]-6-[2-(3,4-dihydroxyphenyl)ethoxy]-5-hydroxy-4-[(2S,3R,4R,5R,6S)-3,4,5-trihydroxy-6-methyloxan-2-yl]oxyoxan-3-yl] (E)-3-(3,4-dihydroxyphenyl)prop-2-enoate
- CAS Number: 81525-13-5
- PubChem CID: 23928102
- ChemSpider: 22912890
- CompTox Dashboard (EPA): DTXSID101317304

Chemical and physical data
- Formula: C_{34}H_{44}O_{19}
- Molar mass: 756.707 g·mol^{−1}
- 3D model (JSmol): Interactive image
- SMILES: C[C@H]1[C@@H]([C@H]([C@H]([C@@H](O1)O[C@@H]2[C@H]([C@@H](O[C@@H]([C@H]2OC(=O)/C=C/C3=CC(=C(C=C3)O)O)CO[C@H]4[C@@H]([C@](CO4)(CO)O)O)OCCC5=CC(=C(C=C5)O)O)O)O)O)O
- InChI: InChI=1S/C34H44O19/c1-15-24(41)25(42)26(43)32(50-15)53-29-27(44)31(47-9-8-17-3-6-19(37)21(39)11-17)51-22(12-48-33-30(45)34(46,13-35)14-49-33)28(29)52-23(40)7-4-16-2-5-18(36)20(38)10-16/h2-7,10-11,15,22,24-33,35-39,41-46H,8-9,12-14H2,1H3/b7-4+/t15-,22+,24-,25+,26+,27+,28+,29+,30-,31+,32-,33+,34+/m0/s1; Key:JMBINOWGIHWPJI-UNSOMVRXSA-N

Forsythoside B is a natural product from the phenylpropanoid/polyphenolic glycoside group, which is found in a number of plant species in the mint order such as Marrubium alysson, Phlomis armeniaca, Scutellaria salviifolia, Phlomoides tuberosa, Phlomoides rotata, Pedicularis longiflora and Teucrium chamaedrys, several of which are used in Chinese traditional medicine in preparations such as Shuanghuanglian (双黄连). It acts as an inhibitor of inflammatory mediators such as TNF-alpha, IL-6, IκB and NF-κB, as well as the temperature sensitive channel TRPV3, but also activates the RhoA/ROCK signaling pathway which can cause hypersensitivity reactions when it is injected intravenously.

== See also ==
- Xiyanping
