= Phlomoides hamosa =

Scientific classification
- Kingdom: Plantae
- Clade: Tracheophytes
- Clade: Angiosperms
- Clade: Eudicots
- Clade: Asterids
- Order: Lamiales
- Family: Lamiaceae
- Genus: Phlomoides
- Species: P. hamosa

Binomial name
- Phlomoides hamosa (Benth.) Mathiesen

Synonyms
- Synonymy: Notochaete hamosa Benth.

Species of flowering plant

Phlomoides hamosa is a perennial flowering plant in the family Lamiaceae native to Bhutan, India, Myanmar, Nepal and Yunnan in China. Reaches 2.5 metres in height and has reddish or yellow flowers. Favours the margins of subtropical evergreen forests and valleys at altitudes between 1,200 and 2,500 metres.

== Medicinal uses ==
In Nepal, the plant (which has the Nepali common names Kuro and Golo kuro) is used in the traditional medicine of the country, the juice of the leaves being used to treat snakebite and indigestion.

== Chemistry ==
Three new nortriterpenoids, notohamosin A (1), B (2) and C (3), having a novel skeleton, as well as eight previously known compounds were isolated from an ethanol extract of the whole plant by a Chinese research team in the year 2003.
