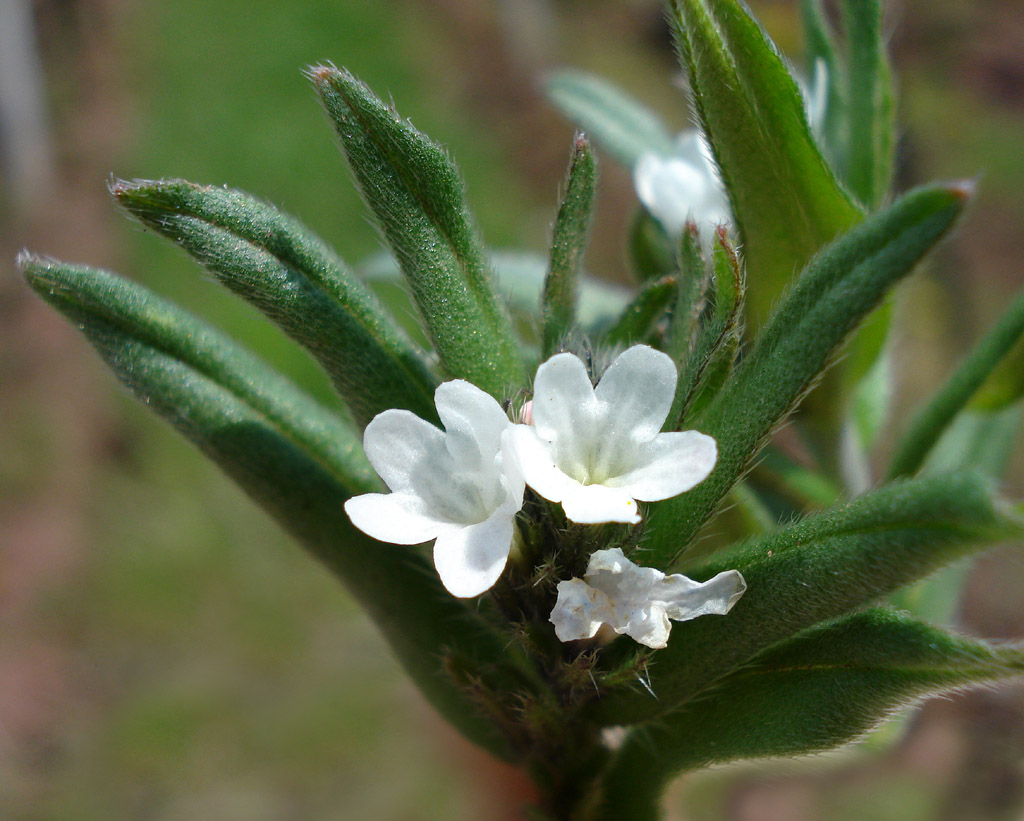
- Buglossoides arvensis

Scientific classification
- Kingdom: Plantae
- Clade: Tracheophytes
- Clade: Angiosperms
- Clade: Eudicots
- Clade: Asterids
- Order: Boraginales
- Family: Boraginaceae
- Subfamily: Boraginoideae
- Genus: Buglossoides; Moench (1794)

Type species
- Buglossoides tenuiflora (L.f.) I.M.Johnst.

Species
- 6; see text

= Buglossoides =

Genus of flowering plants

Buglossoides is a genus consisting of 15 species of annual or perennial herbs, native to Europe and Asia. They grow naturally in habitats ranging from sunny scrub to rocky slopes and woodland areas. These plants are covered in fine bristles or hairs. The stems are upright or sprawling, branched or unbranched, with simple oval to lance-shaped leaves. The small funnel-shaped flowers have flaring lobes and are usually blue or white. Perennial species that are rhizomatous can become invasive and difficult where conditions are suitable.

== Cultivation ==
They are suitable for wild and woodland gardens. Grow this plant in moist well-drained soil that is neutral to alkaline. Propagate from seed, cuttings or by division.

== Species ==
Six species are accepted.

- Buglossoides arvensis (L.) I.M.Johnst.
- Buglossoides czernjajevii (Klokov & Des.-Shost.) Czerep.
- Buglossoides incrassata (Guss.) I.M.Johnst.
- Buglossoides minima (Moris) R.Fern.
- Buglossoides rochelii (Friv.) Stoyanov, Mátis & Sennikov
- Buglossoides tenuiflora (L.f.) I.M.Johnst.

=== Formerly placed here ===
- Aegonychon calabrum (Ten.) ined. (as Buglossoides calabra (Ten.) I.M.Johnst.)
- Aegonychon purpurocaeruleum (L.) Holub (as Buglossoides purpurocaerulea (L.) I.M.Johnst.)
- Aegonychon zollingeri (DC.) Holub (as Buglossoides zollingeri (DC.) I.M.Johnst)

== See also ==
- Lithospermum
