= Phlomoides eremostachydioides =

Scientific classification
- Kingdom: Plantae
- Clade: Tracheophytes
- Clade: Angiosperms
- Clade: Eudicots
- Clade: Asterids
- Order: Lamiales
- Family: Lamiaceae
- Subfamily: Lamioideae
- Genus: Phlomoides
- Species: P. eremostachydioides

Binomial name
- Phlomoides eremostachydioides (Popov) Y.Zhao & C.L.Xiang (2023)

Synonyms
- Neustruevia karatavica Juz. (1954); Pseudomarrubium eremostachydioides Popov (1940)

Genus of flowering plants

Phlomoides eremostachydioides is a species of flowering plant in the mint family, Lamiaceae. It is a subshrub endemic to the Karatau Mountains of Kazakhstan in central Asia.

The species was first described as Pseudomarrubium eremostachydioides by Mikhail Grigorevich Popov in 1940, and placed in the monotypic genus Pseudomarrubium. A phylogenetic analysis published in 2023 concluded that the species belonged in genus Phlomoides.
