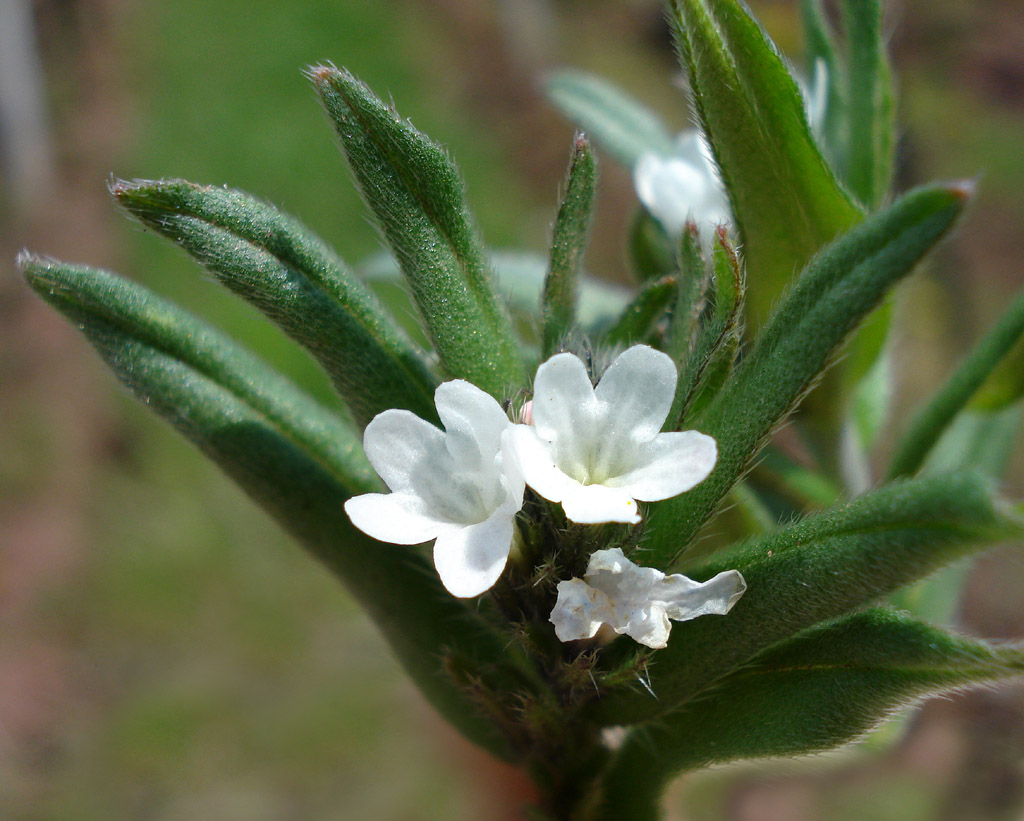

Scientific classification
- Kingdom: Plantae
- Clade: Tracheophytes
- Clade: Angiosperms
- Clade: Eudicots
- Clade: Asterids
- Order: Boraginales
- Family: Boraginaceae
- Genus: Buglossoides
- Species: B. arvensis

Binomial name
- Buglossoides arvensis (L.) I.M.Johnst. (1954)

Synonyms
- Aegonychon arvense (L.) Gray (1821 publ. 1822); Lithospermum arvense L. (1753); Margarospermum arvense (L.) Decne. (1840); Rhytispermum arvense (L.) Link (1829)

= Buglossoides arvensis =

Species of flowering plant in the borage family

Buglossoides arvensis (syn. Lithospermum arvense), known as field gromwell, corn gromwell, bastard alkanet, and stone seed, is a flowering plant of the family Boraginaceae. It is native to Europe and Asia, as far north as Korea, Japan and Russia, and as far south as Afghanistan and northern Pakistan. It is known in other places as an introduced species, including much of North America and Australia.

== Subspecies ==
Three subspecies are accepted.

- Buglossoides arvensis subsp. arvensis
- Buglossoides arvensis subsp. occidentalis Franco
- Buglossoides arvensis subsp. sibthorpiana (Griseb.) R.Fern.

== Uses ==
=== Oil ===
The European Union has granted the refined oil of the seed of Buglossoides arvensis novel food status and some farmers are growing it commercially in the United Kingdom as a plant-variety patented (PVP) and trademarked cultivar (Ahiflower®). The seed oil contains high levels (63–72%) of omega-3 ALA (c18:3), omega-3 SDA (c18:4), and omega-6 GLA (c18:3) and has GRAS (generally regarded as safe) review status from the US Food and Drug Administration, Canadian ingredient master file (IMF) registration and novel food status, and GMP+ Feed Support Product status in the EU for livestock and companion animals (including for defatted expeller press cake meal). The seed oil also has TGA Australia Complementary Medicines approval status, ANVISA/MAPA Brazil human and animal alimentary use approval, and limited food use approvals in Korea and Japan.

Refined Buglossoides oil has peer-reviewed published human clinical evidence from controlled dietary intervention trials showing up to 400% more efficient omega-3 EPA (c20:5) accrual in circulating cells vs flaxseed oil and has been shown to significantly upregulate the cytokine interleukin-10 (IL-10) in lipopolysaccharide (LPS) stimulated macrophages by +40% vs. control. IL-10 is recognized as one of the immune modulatory signaling cytokines that moderates the inflammatory response after intensive exercise or immune challenge. Further, refined Buglossoides oil has been shown to form omega-3 DHA (C22:6) endogenously with comparable efficiency as pure marine DHA in mammals and maintain DHA levels similarly in the brain and liver. It has also been shown in recent peer-reviewed research to promote live probiotic survival into the small intestine in the TIMS-1 simulated gut and contribute beneficially to anti-neuroinflammation response in vitro and synergistically to improved executive function and cognitive flexibility in healthy adults. Based on its fatty acid composition, refined Buglossoides oil naturally provides the body a more diverse array of anti-inflammatory omega-3 and omega-6 (via GLA) substrates than derive from preformed EPA/DHA sources. These include SDA, ETA (C20:4n-3), GLA, and DGLA (C20:3n-6).

=== Archaeological record ===
Seeds of Buglossoides have been reported in Ukrainian archeological sites dating back as far as 4000 BC where they were stored in clay pots, however the purpose and usage of the seeds has not been determined. In modern European arable agriculture, Buglossoides often appears as a weed species with poor competitive and non-invasive characteristics.
