= Phlomoides sagittata =

Scientific classification
- Kingdom: Plantae
- Clade: Tracheophytes
- Clade: Angiosperms
- Clade: Eudicots
- Clade: Asterids
- Order: Lamiales
- Family: Lamiaceae
- Subfamily: Lamioideae
- Genus: Phlomoides
- Species: P. sagittata

Binomial name
- Phlomoides sagittata (Regel) C.L.Xiang & Y.Zhao (2023)

Synonyms
- Ballota sagittata (Regel) Regel (1886); Metastachydium sagittatum (Regel) C.Y.Wu & H.W.Li (1977); Metastachys sagittata (Regel) Knorring (1954); Phlomis sagittata Regel (1879)

Genus of flowering plants

Phlomoides sagittata is a species of flowering plant in the family Lamiaceae. It is a perennial native to Kyrgyzstan (Terskey Ala-too range) and Xinjiang in central Asia.

It is a perennial rhizomatous herb, growing 20 to 70 cm tall. It flowers from May to June and fruits in July and August. It typically grows in river valleys, meadows, or on grassy slopes between 1000 and 1400 meters elevation.

The species was first described as Phlomis sagittata by Eduard August von Regel in 1879. Regel later placed it in genus Ballota and it was subsequently placed in the monotypic genera Metastachys and later Metastachydium. A phylogenetic analysis published in 2023 concluded that the species belonged in genus Phlomoides, and was sister to a clade containing P. adylovii, P. mongolica, P. tuberosa, P. puberula, and P. hybrida.
