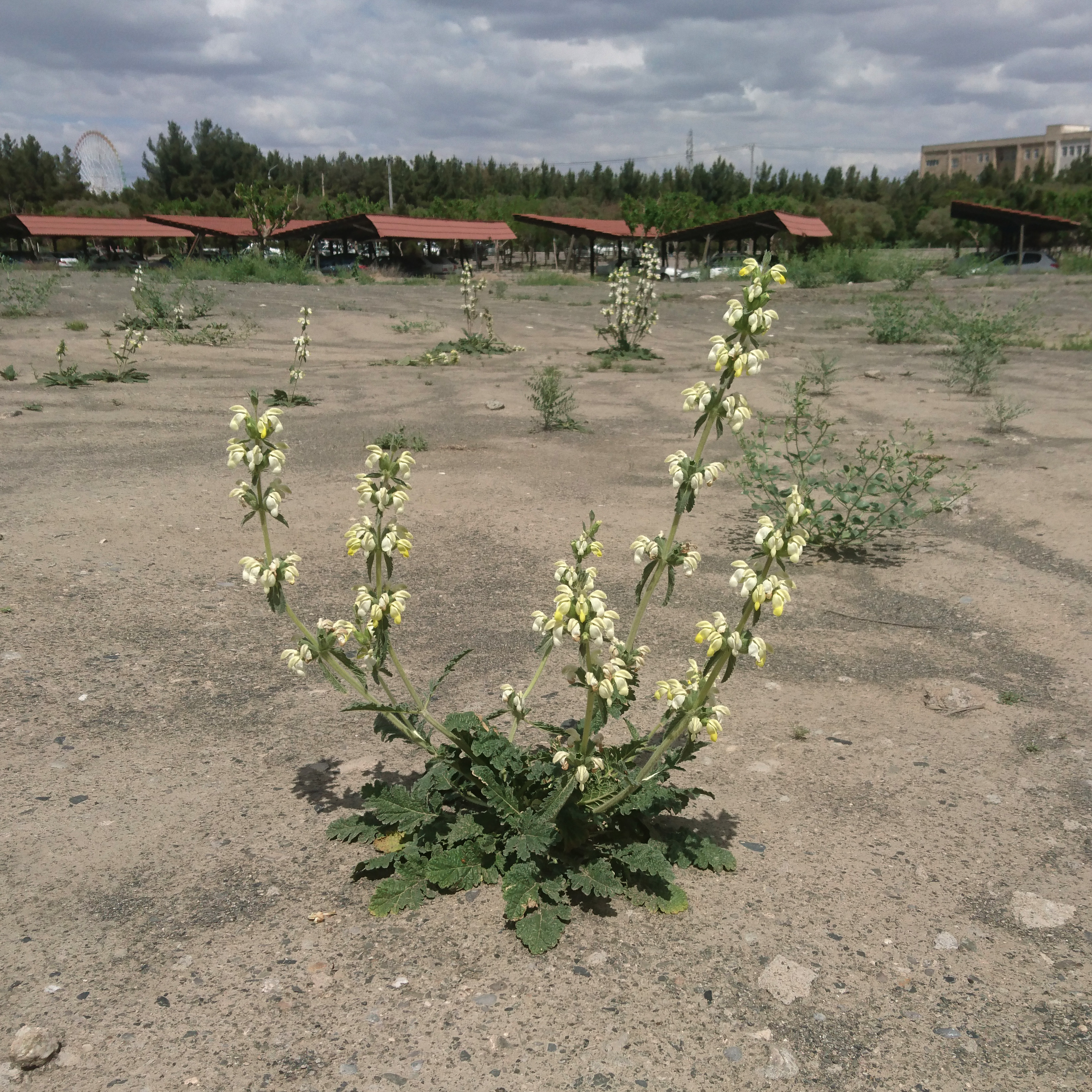

Scientific classification
- Kingdom: Plantae
- Clade: Tracheophytes
- Clade: Angiosperms
- Clade: Eudicots
- Clade: Asterids
- Order: Lamiales
- Family: Lamiaceae
- Genus: Phlomoides
- Species: P. labiosa

Binomial name
- Phlomoides labiosa (Bunge) Adylov, Kamelin & Makhm.

= Phlomoides labiosa =

Species of flowering plant

Phlomoides labiosa is a perennial plant from the Phlomoides genus and Lamiaceae family that grows primarily in the temperate biome. It is native to Iran, Afghanistan, Pakistan, Turkmenistan, Kazakhstan, Kyrgyzstan, Tajikistan, and Uzbekistan.

== Gallery ==
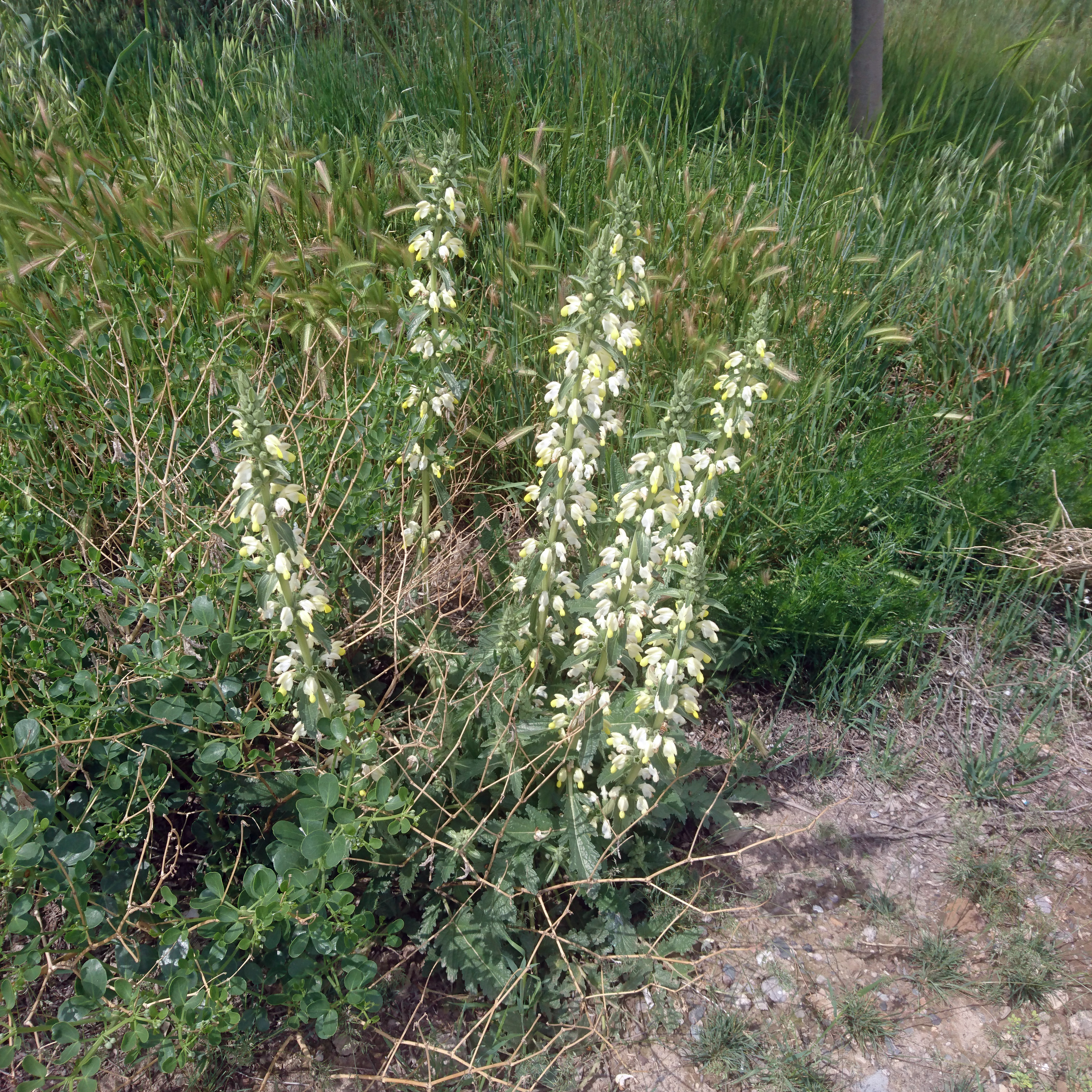

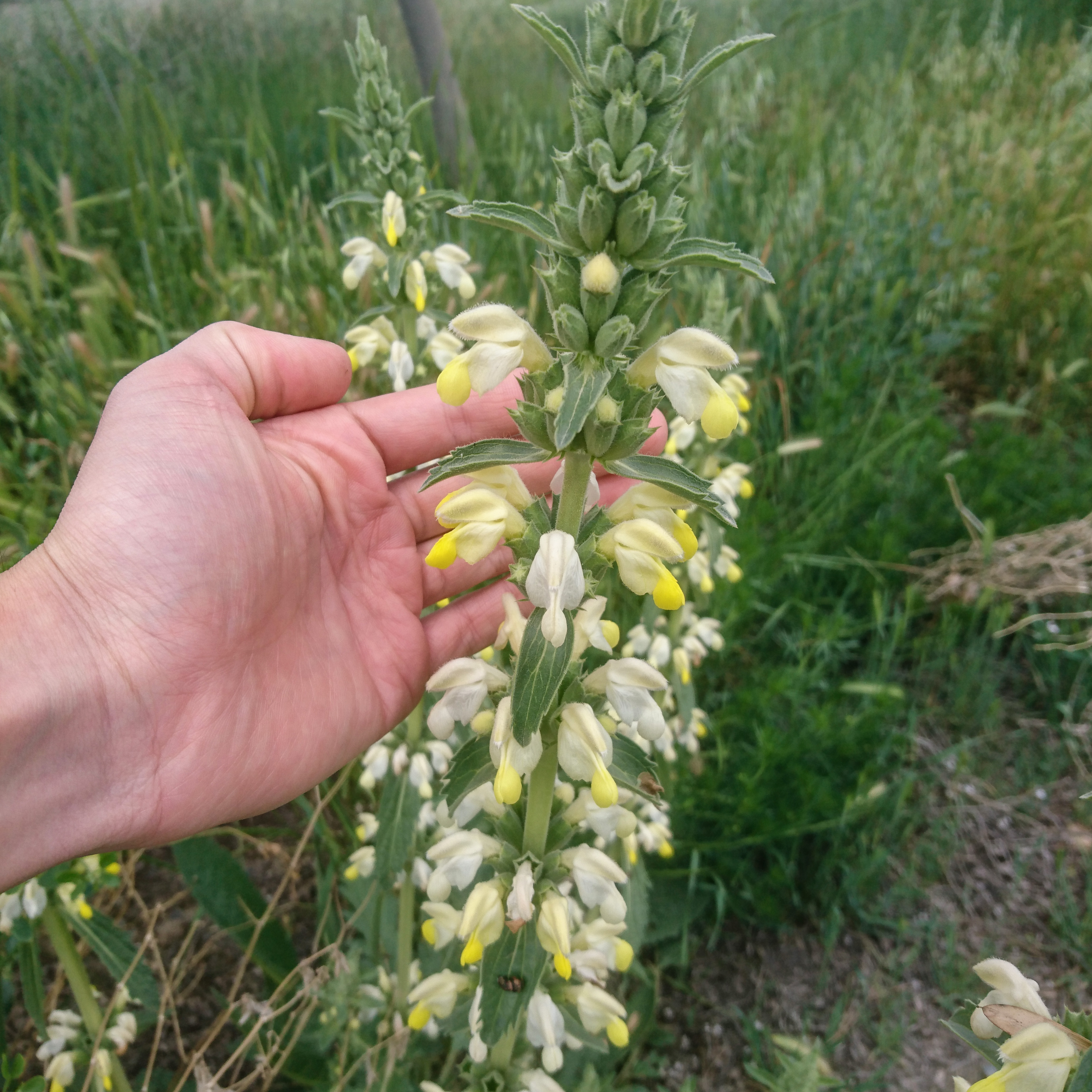

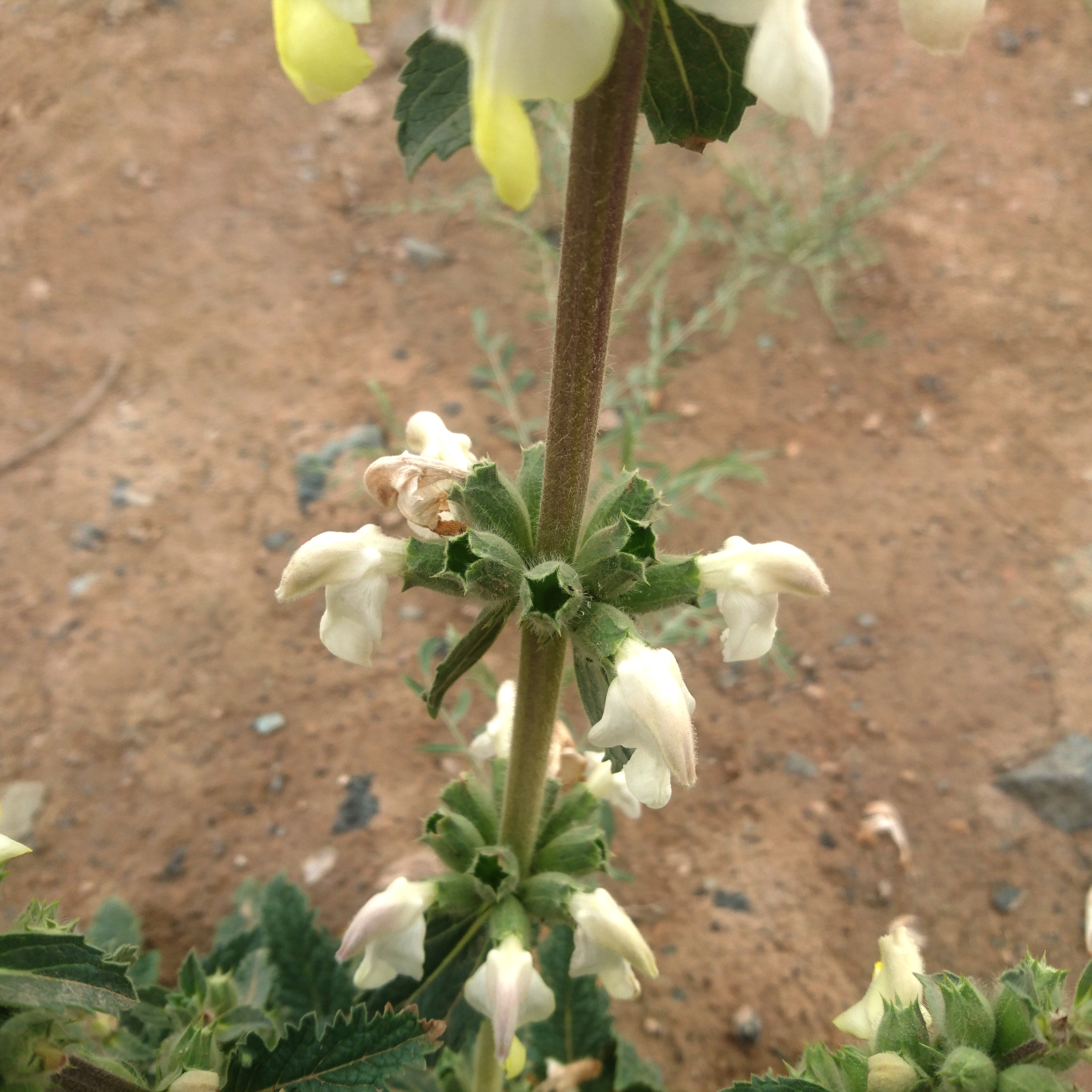

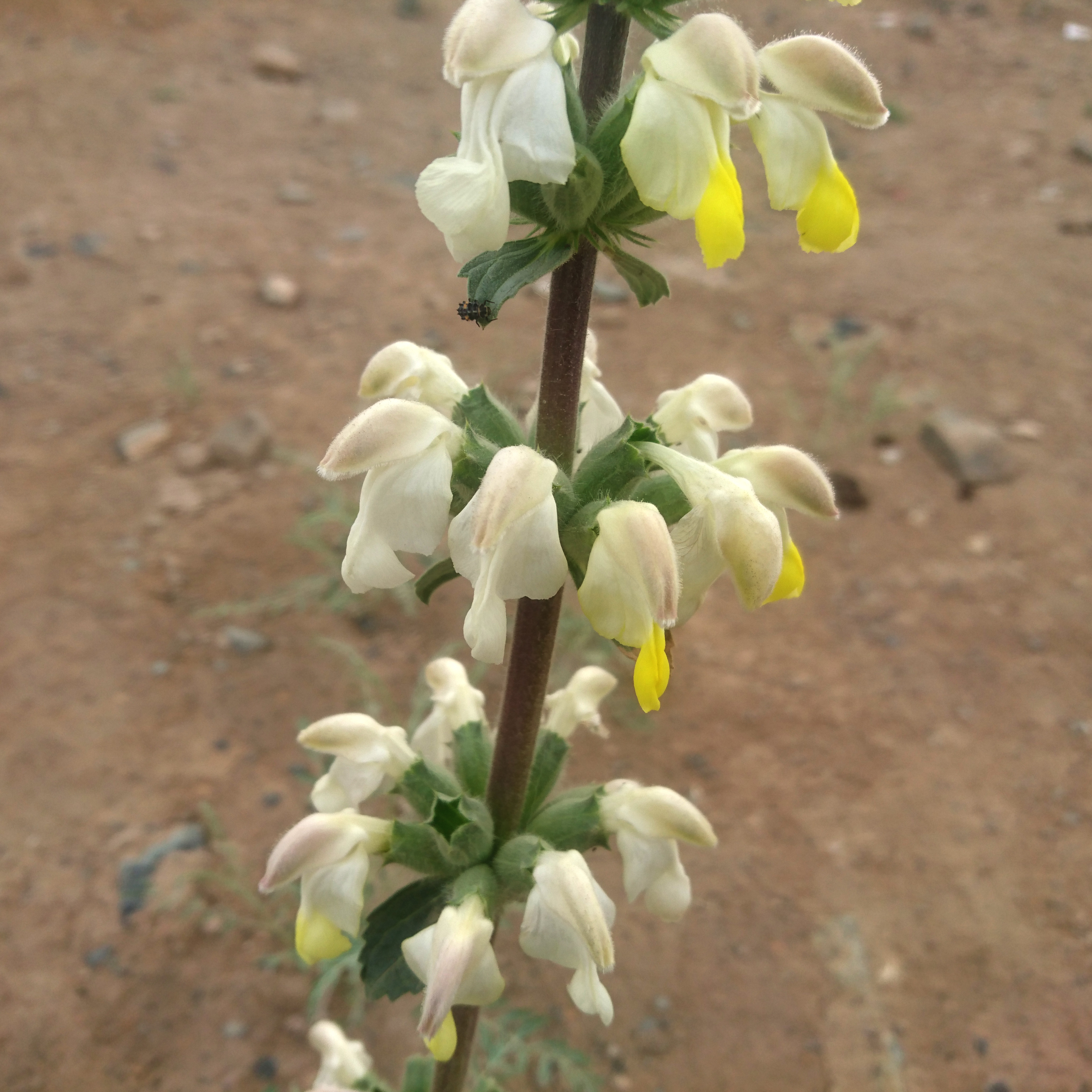

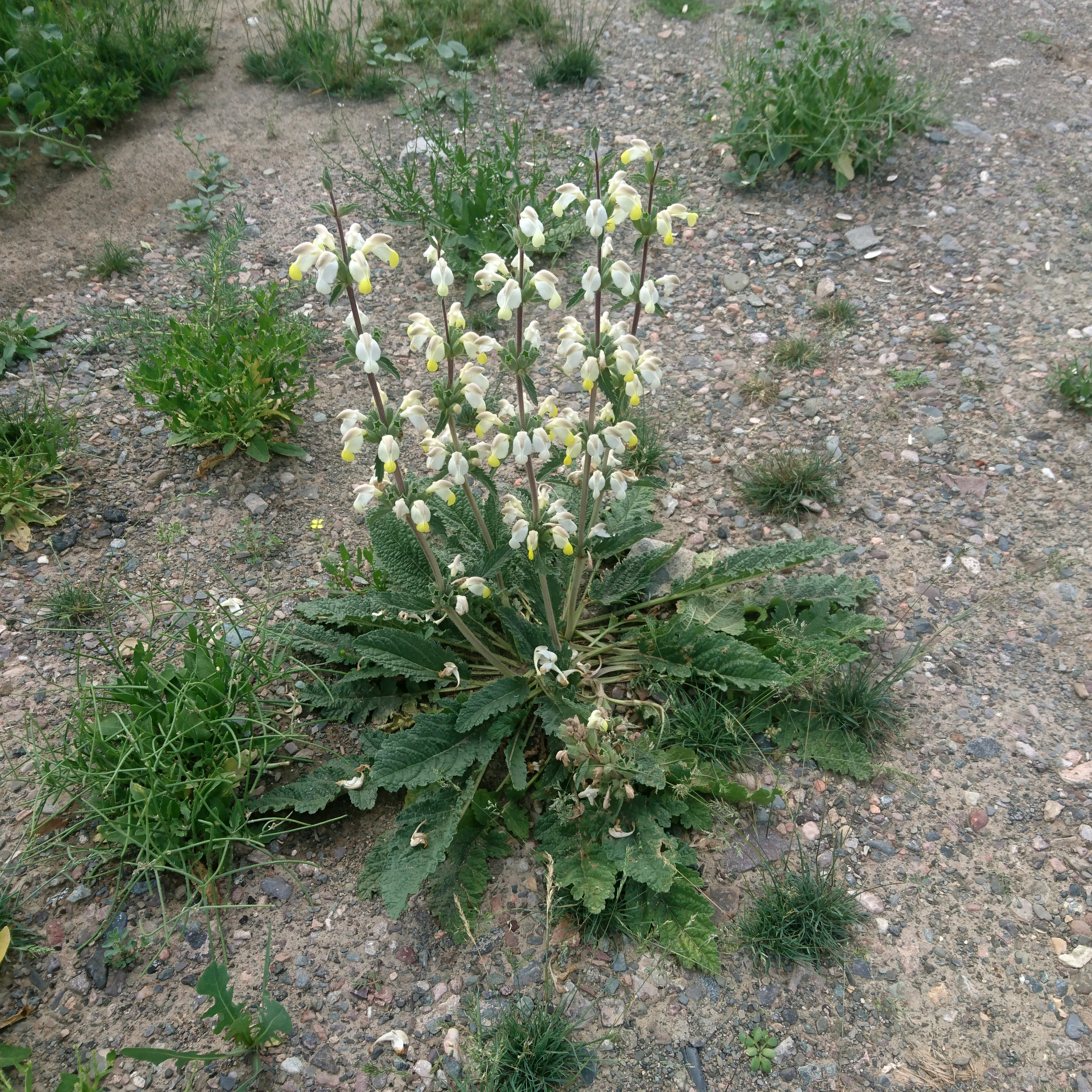

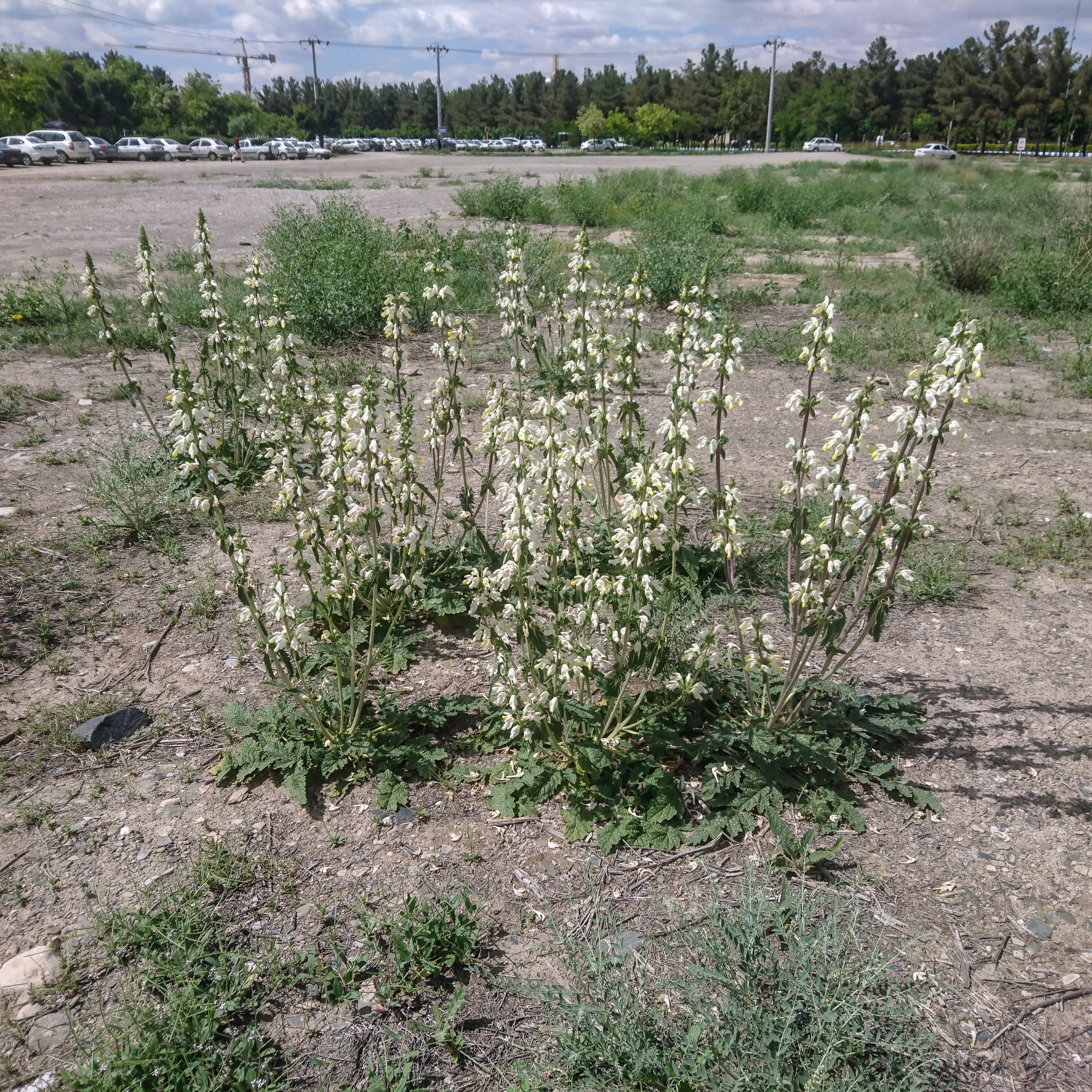

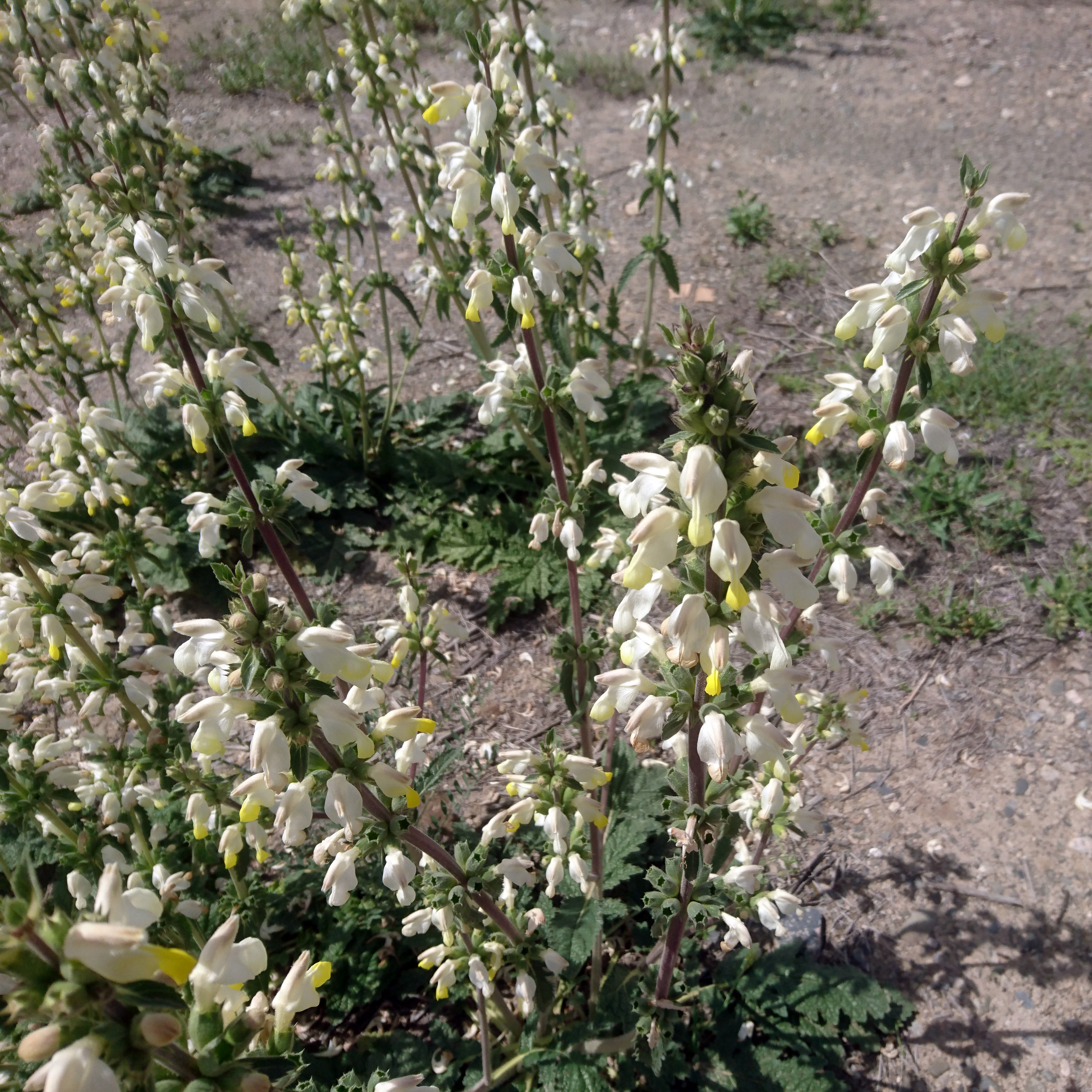

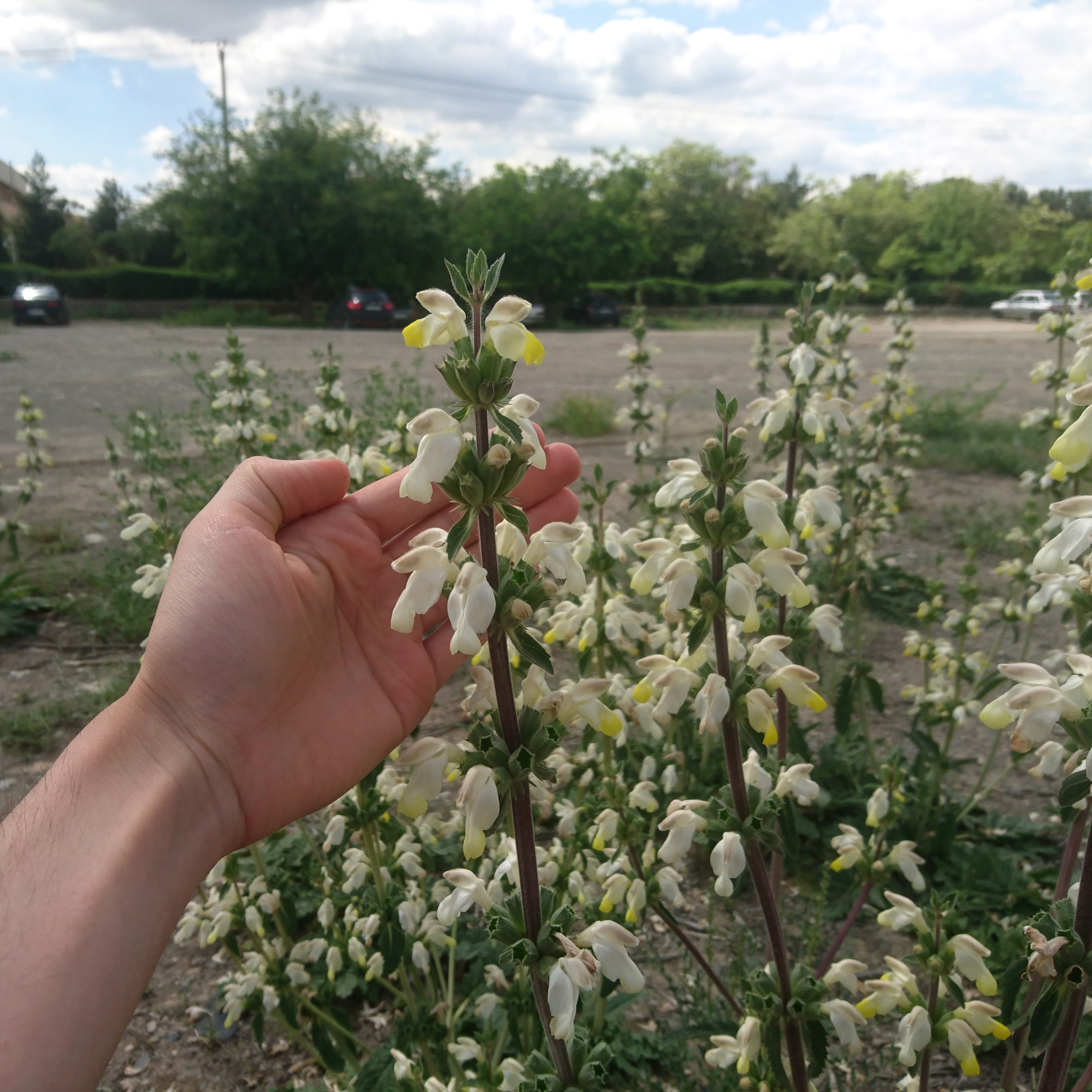
