= Nathaliella =

Scientific classification
- Kingdom: Plantae
- Clade: Tracheophytes
- Clade: Angiosperms
- Clade: Eudicots
- Clade: Asterids
- Order: Lamiales
- Family: Scrophulariaceae
- Genus: Nathaliella; B.Fedtsch.
- Species: N. alaica

Binomial name
- Nathaliella alaica B.Fedtsch.

Synonyms
- Oreosolen alaicus (B.Fedtsch.) Pavlov

Species of flowering plant

Nathaliella is a monotypic genus of flowering plants belonging to the family Scrophulariaceae. The only species is Nathaliella alaica. It is also within Tribe Scrophularieae.

It is native to Kyrgyzstan, Uzbekistan and Xinjiang (in China). It is found on sunny, stone filled slopes, at elevations of 1,500–1,600 metres (4,900–5,200 ft) above sea level.

== Description ==
It has thick roots. The caudex (plant stem) is covered in the remains of old leaves and white bristly hairs. It has a petiole (leaf stalk) that is about as twice as long as the leaf blade. The leaf blade is broadly ovate, lanceolate or ovoid in shape. They are about 1-1.5 cm wide and 0.5–1 cm long, with an entire (or smooth) margin. It flowers in China in June. The flowers are sessile (without stalk) or pedicellate (stalk of a flower), which is short. The Calyx is 4–5 mm long, with 5 deeply lobes. The corolla is about 1.5 cm long, and purple-red, or pink-violet. The limb is indistinctly 2 lipped. The tube is narrowly cylindrical. The throat is slightly dilated. It has 4 stamens, which are attached at the base of corolla tube. The filaments (stamen stalks) are filiform (thread-like) and glabrous (smooth). The anthers are divergent. In August, (in China) it produces a fruit or seed capsule, which is ovoid, and glabrous. It is about 5–10 mm long and 3–4 mm wide. Inside are numerous seeds.

== Taxonomy ==
The genus name of Nathaliella is in honour of Nathalie A. Desjatova-Shostenko (1889–1969), a Russian-French botanist noted for identifying at least 70 species of plants, many in the genus Thymus. The Latin specific epithet of alaica refers to coming from the Alai Mountains between Kyrgyzstan and Tajikistan.

Both species and genus were first described and published in Bot. Zhurn. S.S.S.R. Vol.17 on page 327 in 1932.

== Culture ==
In 2011, a postage stamp series was issued in Uzbekistan with a set of illustrations of flowers, including Nathaliella alaica B. Fedtsch.
