= Parasilaus =

Scientific classification
- Kingdom: Plantae
- Clade: Tracheophytes
- Clade: Angiosperms
- Clade: Eudicots
- Clade: Asterids
- Order: Apiales
- Family: Apiaceae
- Subfamily: Apioideae
- Tribe: Komarovieae
- Genus: Parasilaus; Leute

Genus of plants

Parasilaus is a genus of flowering plants belonging to the family Apiaceae.

Its native range is Central Asia to Afghanistan.

Species:

- Parasilaus afghanicus (Gilli) Leute
- Parasilaus asiaticus (Korovin) Pimenov
