= Michail Klokov =

Ukrainian-Soviet botanist (1896–1981)

Mikhail Vasilevich Klokov (1896–1981) (Михаи́л Васи́льевич Кло́ков in Ukrainian) was a Ukrainian-Soviet botanist. He was one of the main authors and editors of Flora of the Ukrainian SSR (from the 3rd to the 12th volumes) and the first edition of The Plant Identifier of the Ukrainian SSR. Klokov described 547 new species for science, of which 389 belong to Ukraine which consist of 99 genera and 30 families. With Andrei Ivanovich Barbarich (Barbaricz) he issued the exsiccata Herbarium florae reipublicae sovieticae socialisticae Ucrainicae ab Instituto Botanico Academiae Sciences RSS Ukrainicae editum (1961).

The standard author abbreviation Klokov is used to indicate this person as the author when citing a botanical name.
