= Nathalie A. Desjatova-Shostenko =

French botanist (1889-1968)

- Наталія Олексіївна Десятова-Шостенко
- Born: 26 December 1889; Vovchansk
- Died: 23 November 1968 (aged 78)
- Scientific career
- Fields: botany
- Workplaces: Askania-Nova; Ukrainian Institute of Applied Botany

Nathalie A. Desjatova-Shostenko (Ukrainian:Наталія Олексіївна Десятова-Шостенко, Russian: Наталья Алексеевна Десятова-Шостенко), later Nathalie A. Roussine, (1889–1968) was a French botanist noted for identifying at least 70 species of plants, many in the genus Thymus.

Between 1925 and 1930, Natalie Shostenko was a director of Botany Department at Askania-Nova, after 1930 she then directed the Department of Geography at the Ukrainian Institute of Applied Botany. In 1944 she emigrated to France, due to return of the Soviet regime to Ukraine.

In 1932, botanist B.Fedtsch. published Nathaliella, a monotypic genus of flowering plants from Central Asia, belonging to the family Scrophulariaceae in her honour.
