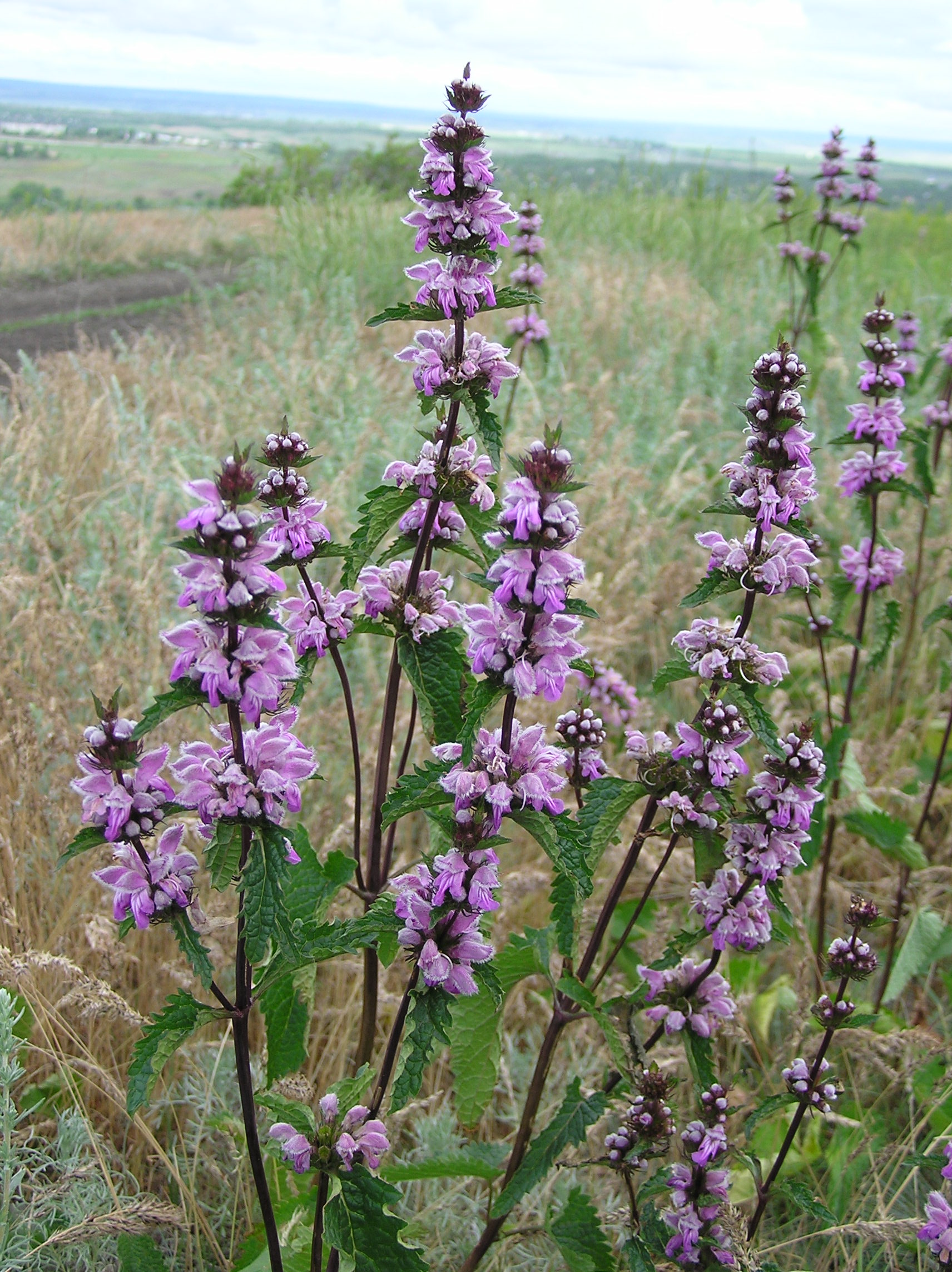
- Phlomoides tuberosa

Scientific classification
- Kingdom: Plantae
- Clade: Embryophytes
- Clade: Tracheophytes
- Clade: Angiosperms
- Clade: Eudicots
- Clade: Asterids
- Order: Lamiales
- Family: Lamiaceae
- Subfamily: Lamioideae
- Genus: Phlomoides; Moench (1794)

Species
- 175, see text

Synonyms
- Clueria Raf. (1837); Eremostachys Bunge (1830); Lamiophlomis Kudô (1929); Metastachydium Airy Shaw ex C.Y.Wu & H.W.Li (1977); Metastachys Knorring (1954), nom. illeg.; Neustruevia Juz. (1954); Notochaete Benth. (1830); Orlowia Gueldenst. ex Georgi (1800); Paraeremostachys Adylov, Kamelin & Makhm. (1986); Phlomidopsis Link (1829), nom. superfl.; Phlomitis Rchb. ex T.Nees (1843), nom. superfl.; Pseuderemostachys Popov (1940 publ. 1941); Pseudomarrubium Popov (1940); Trambis Raf. (1837)

= Phlomoides =

Genus of flowering plants in the sage family

Phlomoides, also called Jerusalem sage and Lampwick plant, is a genus of over 130 species of flowering plants in the family Lamiaceae, native from the eastern Mediterranean Basin through Eastern Europe, western and central Asia, and the Indian subcontinent to China, Korea, and the Russian Far East. Phlomoides now comprises many species formerly in the genus Phlomis, and the former genera Eremostachys, Lamiophlomis, Notochaete, and Pseuderemostachys.

== Species ==
176 species are accepted.

- Phlomoides acaulis (Beck ex Rech.f.) Salmaki
- Phlomoides adenantha (Jaub. & Spach) Kamelin & Makhm.
- Phlomoides admirabilis (Czern.) Kamelin & Makhm.
- Phlomoides adylovii Lazkov
- Phlomoides affinis (Schrenk) Salmaki
- Phlomoides agraria (Bunge) Adylov, Kamelin & Makhm.
- Phlomoides ajdarovae Lazkov
- Phlomoides alaica (Knorring) Adylov, Kamelin & Makhm.
- Phlomoides alberti (Regel) Adylov, Kamelin & Makhm.
- Phlomoides alpina (Pall.) Adylov, Kamelin & Makhm.
- Phlomoides ambigua (Popov ex Pazij & Vved.) Adylov, Kamelin & Makhm.
- Phlomoides ammophila (Rech.f.) Salmaki
- Phlomoides andersii (Rech.f.) Kamelin & Makhm.
- Phlomoides anisochila Pazij & Vved.) Salmaki
- Phlomoides aralensis (Bunge) Salmaki
- Phlomoides arctifolia (Popov) Adylov, Kamelin & Makhm.
- Phlomoides ariana (Hedge) Kamelin & Makhm.
- Phlomoides atropurpurea (Dunn) Kamelin & Makhm.
- Phlomoides azerbaijanica (Rech.f.) Kamelin & Makhm.
- Phlomoides baburii (Adylov) Adylov
- Phlomoides badakshanica (Hedge) Salmaki
- Phlomoides baissunensis (Popov) Adylov, Kamelin & Makhm.
- Phlomoides baldschuanica (Regel) Adylov, Kamelin & Makhm.
- Phlomoides bamianica (Rech.f.) Kamelin & Makhm.
- Phlomoides beckeri (Regel) Adylov, Kamelin & Makhm.
- Phlomoides betonicoides (Diels) Kamelin & Makhm.
- Phlomoides binaludensis Salmaki & Joharchi
- Phlomoides boissieriana (Regel) Adylov, Kamelin & Makhm.
- Phlomoides boraldaica A.L.Ebel
- Phlomoides botschantzevii (Adylov) Adylov
- Phlomoides brachystegia (Bunge) Adylov, Kamelin & Makhm.
- Phlomoides bracteosa (Royle ex Benth.) Kamelin & Makhm.
- Phlomoides breviflora (Benth.) Kamelin & Makhm.
- Phlomoides burmanica (Mukerjee) Kamelin & Makhm.
- Phlomoides calophyta (Hedge) Salmaki & Almasi
- Phlomoides canescens (Regel) Adylov, Kamelin & Makhm.
- Phlomoides chinghoensis (C.Y.Wu) Kamelin & Makhm.
- Phlomoides codonantha Sennikov
- Phlomoides codonocalyx Kamelin & Makhm.
- Phlomoides congesta (C.Y.Wu) Kamelin & Makhm.
- Phlomoides cordifolia (Regel) Adylov, Kamelin & Makhm.
- Phlomoides cuneata (C.Y.Wu) C.L.Xiang & H.Peng
- Phlomoides czuiliensis (Golosk.) Adylov, Kamelin & Makhm.
- Phlomoides dentosa (Franch.) Kamelin & Makhm.
- Phlomoides deserticola Sennikov
- Phlomoides ebracteolata (Popov) Adylov, Kamelin & Makhm.
- Phlomoides edelbergii (Rech.f.) Salmaki
- Phlomoides eremostachydioides (Popov) Y.Zhao & C.L.Xiang
- Phlomoides eriocalyx (Regel) Adylov, Kamelin & Makhm.
- Phlomoides ferganensis (Popov) Adylov, Kamelin & Makhm.
- Phlomoides fetisowii (Regel) Adylov, Kamelin & Makhm.
- Phlomoides fimbriata (C.Y.Wu) Kamelin & Makhm.
- Phlomoides forrestii (Diels) Kamelin & Makhm.
- Phlomoides franchetiana (Diels) Kamelin & Makhm.
- Phlomoides freitagii (Rech.f.) Kamelin & Makhm.
- Phlomoides fulgens (Bunge) Adylov, Kamelin & Makhm.
- Phlomoides ghorana (Rech.f.) Salmaki
- Phlomoides glabra (Boiss. ex Benth.) Kamelin & Makhm.
- Phlomoides glanduligera (Popov) Salmaki
- Phlomoides goloskokovii Lazkov
- Phlomoides gymnocalyx (Schrenk) Adylov, Kamelin & Makhm.
- Phlomoides gymnoclada (Rech.f. & Köie) Kamelin & Makhm.
- Phlomoides gypsacea (Popov) Adylov, Kamelin & Makhm.
- Phlomoides hajastanica (Sosn. ex Grossh.) Kamelin & Makhm.
- Phlomoides hamosa (Benth.) Mathiesen
- Phlomoides hissarica (Regel) Adylov, Kamelin & Makhm.
- Phlomoides hybrida (Zelen.) Kamelin & Makhm.
- Phlomoides hyoscyamoides (Boiss. & Buhse) Kamelin & Makhm.
- Phlomoides hypoviridis Lazkov
- Phlomoides iliensis (Regel) Adylov, Kamelin & Makhm.
- Phlomoides inaequalisepala (C.Y.Wu) Kamelin & Makhm.
- Phlomoides integior (Pazij & Vved.) Adylov, Kamelin & Makhm.
- Phlomoides isochila (Pazij & Vved.) Salmaki
- Phlomoides jeholensis (Nakai & Kitag.) Kamelin & Makhm.
- Phlomoides kansuensis (C.Y.Wu) Kamelin & Makhm.
- Phlomoides karatavica (Pavlov) Lazkov & Sennikov
- Phlomoides kaufmanniana (Regel) Adylov, Kamelin & Makhm.
- Phlomoides kirghisorum Adylov, Kamelin & Makhm.
- Phlomoides koraiensis (Nakai) Kamelin & Makhm. – Korean Jerusalem sage
- Phlomoides korovinii (Popov) Adylov, Kamelin & Makhm.
- Phlomoides kurpsaica Lazkov
- Phlomoides labiosa (Bunge) Adylov, Kamelin & Makhm.
- Phlomoides labiosiformis (Popov) Adylov, Kamelin & Makhm.
- Phlomoides labiosissima (Pazij & Vved.) Adylov, Kamelin & Makhm.
- Phlomoides laciniata (L.) Kamelin & Makhm.
- Phlomoides laevigata (Bunge) Kamelin & Makhm.
- Phlomoides lanata (Jamzad) Salmaki
- Phlomoides lehmanniana (Bunge) Adylov, Kamelin & Makhm.
- Phlomoides leiocalyx (Pazij & Vved.) Adylov, Kamelin & Makhm.
- Phlomoides liangwangshanensis Y.Zhao, H.L.Zheng & C.L.Xiang
- Phlomoides likiangensis (C.Y.Wu) Kamelin & Makhm.
- Phlomoides lindbergii (Rech.f.) Salmaki
- Phlomoides loasifolia (Benth.) Kamelin & Makhm.
- Phlomoides longiaristata (C.Y.Wu & H.W.Li) Salmaki
- Phlomoides longicalyx (C.Y.Wu) Kamelin & Makhm.
- Phlomoides longidentata Pendry
- Phlomoides macrophylla (Benth.) Kamelin & Makhm. – Maximowicz's Jerusalem sage
- Phlomoides maximowiczii (Regel) Kamelin & Makhm.
- Phlomoides mazzettii Lazkov
- Phlomoides medicinalis (Diels) Kamelin & Makhm.
- Phlomoides megalantha (Diels) Kamelin & Makhm.
- Phlomoides melanantha (Diels) Kamelin & Makhm.
- Phlomoides michaelis Adylov, Kamelin & Makhm.
- Phlomoides milingensis (C.Y.Wu & H.W.Li) Kamelin & Makhm.
- Phlomoides milkoi Lazkov
- Phlomoides minutigalea Salmaki
- Phlomoides mogianica (Popov) Salmaki
- Phlomoides molucelloides (Bunge) Salmaki
- Phlomoides mongolica (Turcz.) Kamelin & A.L.Budantzev
- Phlomoides muliensis (C.Y.Wu) Kamelin & Makhm.
- Phlomoides multifurcata Salmaki
- Phlomoides nuda (Regel) Adylov, Kamelin & Makhm.
- Phlomoides oreophila Kar. & Kir.) Adylov, Kamelin & Makhm.
- Phlomoides ornata (C.Y.Wu) Kamelin & Makhm.
- Phlomoides ostrowskiana (Regel) Adylov, Kamelin & Makhm.
- Phlomoides pacifica Kamelin & Shlotg.
- Phlomoides paniculata (Regel) Salmaki
- Phlomoides paohsingensis (C.Y.Wu) Kamelin & Makhm.
- Phlomoides paropamisica (Rech.f.) Kamelin & Makhm.
- Phlomoides pectinata (Popov) Adylov, Kamelin & Makhm.
- Phlomoides pedunculata (Y.Z.Sun) Kamelin & Makhm.
- Phlomoides persimilis (Aitch. & Hemsl.) Salmaki
- Phlomoides popovii (Gontsch.) Adylov, Kamelin & Makhm.
- Phlomoides pratensis (Kar. & Kir.) Adylov, Kamelin & Makhm.
- Phlomoides pseudokorovinii Lazkov
- Phlomoides puberula (Krylov & Serg.) Adylov, Kamelin & Makhm.
- Phlomoides pulchra (Popov) Adylov, Kamelin & Makhm.
- Phlomoides pulvinaris (Jaub. & Spach) Kamelin & Makhm.
- Phlomoides pygmaea (C.Y.Wu) Kamelin & Makhm.
- Phlomoides rastagalensis (Hedge) Kamelin & Makhm.
- Phlomoides regeliana (Aitch. & Hemsl.) Adylov, Kamelin & Makhm.
- Phlomoides rotala (Schrenk ex Fisch., C.A.Mey. & Avé-Lall.) Salmaki
- Phlomoides rotata (Benth. ex Hook.f.) Mathiesen
- Phlomoides ruptilis (C.Y.Wu) Kamelin & Makhm.
- Phlomoides sagittata (Regel) C.L.Xiang & Y.Zhao
- Phlomoides salangensis (Rech.f.) Kamelin & Makhm.
- Phlomoides sanglechensis (Rech.f.) Kamelin & Makhm.
- Phlomoides sarawschanica (Regel) Adylov, Kamelin & Makhm.
- Phlomoides schugnanica (Popov) Adylov, Kamelin & Makhm.
- Phlomoides septentrionalis (Popov) Adylov, Kamelin & Makhm.
- Phlomoides setifera (Bureau & Franch.) Kamelin & Makhm.
- Phlomoides sewerzovii (Herder) Mathiesen
- Phlomoides similis (Czern.) Kamelin & Makhm.
- Phlomoides sogdiana (Pazij & Vved.) Salmaki
- Phlomoides speciosa (Rupr.) Adylov, Kamelin & Makhm.
- Phlomoides spectabilis (Falc. ex Benth.) Kamelin & Makhm.
- Phlomoides stellata Lazkov
- Phlomoides stenocalycina (Rech.f.) Kamelin & Makhm.
- Phlomoides stocksii (Boiss.) Kamelin & Makhm.
- Phlomoides strigosa (C.Y.Wu) Kamelin & Makhm.
- Phlomoides subspicata (Popov) Adylov, Kamelin & Makhm.
- Phlomoides superba (Royle ex Benth.) Kamelin & Makhm.
- Phlomoides szechuanensis (C.Y.Wu) Kamelin & Makhm.
- Phlomoides tadshikistanica (B.Fedtsch.) Adylov, Kamelin & Makhm.
- Phlomoides tatsienensis (Bureau & Franch.) Kamelin & Makhm.
- Phlomoides thyrsiflora (Benth.) Salmaki
- Phlomoides tianschanica (Popov) Adylov, Kamelin & Makhm.
- Phlomoides tibetica (C.Marquand & Airy Shaw) Kamelin & Makhm.
- Phlomoides tournefortii (Jaub. & Spach) Kamelin & Makhm.
- Phlomoides transjordanica (Eig) Salmaki & Almasi
- Phlomoides transoxana (Bunge) Salmaki
- Phlomoides tschimganica (Vved.) Adylov, Kamelin & Makhm.
- Phlomoides tuberosa (L.) Moench
- Phlomoides tuvinica (A.Schroet.) Kamelin, Adylov & Makhm.
- Phlomoides umbrosa (Turcz.) Kamelin & Makhm. – shady Jerusalem sage
- Phlomoides uniceps (C.Y.Wu) Kamelin & Makhm.
- Phlomoides uniflora (Regel) Adylov, Kamelin & Makhm.
- Phlomoides uralensis Salmaki
- Phlomoides urodonta (Popov) Adylov, Kamelin & Makhm.
- Phlomoides vavilovii (Popov) Adylov, Kamelin & Makhm.
- Phlomoides vicaryi (Benth. ex Hook.f.) Kamelin & Makhm.
- Phlomoides vulnerans (Rech.f. & Köie) Kamelin & Makhm.
- Phlomoides woroschilovii (Makarov) Prob.
- Phlomoides younghusbandii (Mukerjee) Kamelin & Makhm.
- Phlomoides zenaidae (Popov) Adylov, Kamelin & Makhm.
- Phlomoides bomiensis C.L.Xiang & Y.Zhao
