= List of Apiaceae of South Africa =

List of flowering plants in the family Apiaceae recorded from South Africa

Apiaceae or Umbelliferae is a family of mostly aromatic flowering plants (anthophytes) in the order Apiales. Apiaceae is named after the type genus Apium and commonly known as the celery, carrot or parsley family, or simply as umbellifers. It is the 16th-largest family of flowering plants, with more than 3,700 species in 434 genera It includes a significant number of phototoxic species, and a smaller number of highly poisonous species.

23,420 species of vascular plant have been recorded in South Africa, making it the sixth most species-rich country in the world and the most species-rich country on the African continent. Of these, 153 species are considered to be threatened. Nine biomes have been described in South Africa: Fynbos, Succulent Karoo, desert, Nama Karoo, grassland, savanna, Albany thickets, the Indian Ocean coastal belt, and forests.

The 2018 South African National Biodiversity Institute's National Biodiversity Assessment plant checklist lists 35,130 taxa in the phyla Anthocerotophyta (hornworts (6)), Anthophyta (flowering plants (33534)), Bryophyta (mosses (685)), Cycadophyta (cycads (42)), Lycopodiophyta (Lycophytes(45)), Marchantiophyta (liverworts (376)), Pinophyta (conifers (33)), and Pteridophyta (cryptogams (408)).

65 genera are represented in the literature. Listed taxa include species, subspecies, varieties, and forms as recorded, some of which have subsequently been allocated to other taxa as synonyms, in which cases the accepted taxon is appended to the listing. Multiple entries under alternative names reflect taxonomic revision over time.

== Aethusa ==
Genus Aethusa:

- Aethusa leptophylla (Pers.) Spreng. accepted as Cyclospermum leptophyllum (Pers.) Sprague ex Britton & P.Wilson

== Afroligusticum ==
Genus Afroligusticum:

- Afroligusticum thodei (T.H.Arnold) P.J.D.Winter, indig
- Afroligusticum wilmsianum (H.Wolff) P.J.D.Winter, endemic

== Afrosciadium ==
Genus Afrosciadium:

- Afrosciadium afrum (Meisn.) P.J.D.Winter, indigenous
- Afrosciadium magalismontanum (Sond.) P.J.D.Winter, indigenous
- Afrosciadium natalense (Sond.) P.J.D.Winter, endemic
- Afrosciadium platycarpum (Sond.) P.J.D.Winter, endemic

== Agrocharis ==
Genus Agrocharis:

- Agrocharis melanantha Hochst. indigenous

== Alepidea ==
Genus Alepidea:

- Alepidea acutidens Weim. indigenous
  - Alepidea acutidens Weim. var. acutidens, endemic
  - Alepidea acutidens Weim. var. dispar Weim. endemic
- Alepidea amatymbica Eckl. & Zeyh. indigenous
  - Alepidea amatymbica Eckl. & Zeyh. var. amatymbica endemic
  - Alepidea amatymbica Eckl. & Zeyh. var. aquatica (Kuntze) Weim. endemic
  - Alepidea amatymbica Eckl. & Zeyh. var. cordata Sond. accepted as Alepidea cordifolia B.-E.van Wyk
  - Alepidea amatymbica Eckl. & Zeyh. var. microbracteata Weim. endemic
- Alepidea angustifolia Schltr. & H.Wolff, accepted as Alepidea peduncularis Steud. ex A.Rich.
- Alepidea attenuata Weim. indigenous
- Alepidea basinuda Pott, indigenous
  - Alepidea basinuda Pott var. basinuda, indigenous
  - Alepidea basinuda Pott var. subnuda Weim. endemic
- Alepidea capensis (P.J.Bergius) R.A.Dyer, indigenous
  - Alepidea capensis (P.J.Bergius) R.A.Dyer var. capensis, endemic
  - Alepidea capensis (P.J.Bergius) R.A.Dyer var. tenella (Schltr. & H.Wolff) Weim. endemic
- Alepidea cirsiifolia Schltr. & H.Wolff, endemic
- Alepidea comosa Dummer, accepted as Alepidea peduncularis Steud. ex A.Rich.
- Alepidea cordifolia B.-E.van Wyk, indigenous
- Alepidea delicatula Weim. endemic
- Alepidea duplidens Weim. endemic
- Alepidea galpinii Dummer, indigenous
- Alepidea gracilis Dummer, accepted as Alepidea peduncularis Steud. ex A.Rich.
- Alepidea insculpta Hilliard & B.L.Burtt, endemic
- Alepidea jenkinsii Pott, accepted as Alepidea peduncularis Steud. ex A.Rich.
- Alepidea longeciliata Schinz ex Dummer, endemic
- Alepidea longifolia E.Mey. ex Dummer subsp. lancifolia Weim. accepted as Alepidea peduncularis Steud. ex A.Rich.
  - Alepidea longifolia E.Mey. ex Dummer subsp. swynertonii (Dummer) Weim. accepted as Alepidea peduncularis Steud. ex A.Rich.
  - Alepidea longifolia E.Mey. ex Dummer var. angusta Dummer accepted as Alepidea peduncularis Steud. ex A.Rich.
  - Alepidea longifolia E.Mey. ex Dummer var. longifolia accepted as Alepidea peduncularis Steud. ex A.Rich.
- Alepidea macowani Dummer, endemic
- Alepidea multisecta B.L.Burtt, endemic
- Alepidea natalensis J.M.Wood & M.S.Evans, indigenous
- Alepidea peduncularis Steud. ex A.Rich. indigenous
- Alepidea pilifera Weim. indigenous
- Alepidea pusilla Weim. indigenous
- Alepidea reticulata Weim. indigenous
- Alepidea serrata Eckl. & Zeyh. indigenous
  - Alepidea serrata Eckl. & Zeyh. var. cathcartensis (Kuntze) Weim. endemic
  - Alepidea serrata Eckl. & Zeyh. var. serrata endemic
- Alepidea setifera N.E.Br. indigenous
- Alepidea stellata Weim. indigenous
- Alepidea thodei Dummer, indigenous
- Alepidea woodii Oliv. indigenous
- Alepidea wyliei Dummer, accepted as Alepidea peduncularis Steud. ex A.Rich.

== Ammi ==
Genus Ammi:

- Ammi majus L. not indigenous
  - Ammi majus L. var. glaucifolium (L.) Godr. not indigenous, invasive

== Anginon ==
Genus Anginon:

- Anginon difforme (L.) B.L.Burtt, endemic
- Anginon fruticosum I.Allison & B.-E.van Wyk, endemic
- Anginon intermedium I.Allison & B.-E.van Wyk, endemic
- Anginon jaarsveldii B.L.Burtt, endemic
- Anginon paniculatum (Thunb.) B.L.Burtt, endemic
- Anginon pumilum I.Allison & B.-E.van Wyk, endemic
- Anginon rugosum (Thunb.) Raf. endemic
- Anginon swellendamensis (Eckl. & Zeyh.) B.L.Burtt, endemic
- Anginon tenuior I.Allison & B.-E.van Wyk, endemic
- Anginon ternatum I.Allison & B.-E.van Wyk, endemic
- Anginon uitenhagense (Eckl. & Zeyh.) B.L.Burtt, accepted as Anginon rugosum (Thunb.) Raf.
- Anginon verticillatum (Sond.) B.L.Burtt, indigenous

== Annesorhiza ==
Genus Annesorhiza:

- Annesorhiza altiscapa Schltr. endemic
- Annesorhiza articulata Magee, endemic
- Annesorhiza asparagoides B.-E.van Wyk, endemic
- Annesorhiza bracteosa Magee, endemic
- Annesorhiza burttii B.-E.van Wyk, endemic
- Annesorhiza calcicola Magee & J.C.Manning, endemic
- Annesorhiza elata Eckl. & Zeyh. accepted as Annesorhiza grandiflora (Thunb.) M.Hiroe
- Annesorhiza elsiae Vessio, Tilney & B.-E.van Wyk, endemic
- Annesorhiza fibrosa B.-E.van Wyk, endemic
- Annesorhiza filicaulis Eckl. & Zeyh. endemic
- Annesorhiza flagellifolia Burtt Davy, endemic
- Annesorhiza grandiflora (Thunb.) M.Hiroe, endemic
- Annesorhiza hirsuta Eckl. & Zeyh. accepted as Annesorhiza grandiflora (Thunb.) M.Hiroe
- Annesorhiza lateriflora (Eckl. & Zeyh.) B.-E.van Wyk, endemic
- Annesorhiza laticostata Magee, endemic
- Annesorhiza latifolia Adamson, endemic
- Annesorhiza macrocarpa Eckl. & Zeyh. endemic
- Annesorhiza marlothii H.Wolff, accepted as Annesorhiza lateriflora (Eckl. & Zeyh.) B.-E.van Wyk
- Annesorhiza nuda (Aiton) B.L.Burtt, endemic
- Annesorhiza radiata Magee, endemic
- Annesorhiza refracta Magee, endemic
- Annesorhiza schlechteri H.Wolff, endemic
- Annesorhiza thunbergii B.L.Burtt, endemic
- Annesorhiza triternata (Eckl. & Zeyh.) Vessio, Tilney & B.-E.van Wyk, endemic
- Annesorhiza villosa (Thunb.) Sond. accepted as Annesorhiza grandiflora (Thunb.) M.Hiroe
- Annesorhiza wilmsii H.Wolff, indigenous

== Anthriscus ==
Genus Anthriscus:

- Anthriscus sylvestris (L.) Hoffm. var. sylvestris, not indigenous

== Apium ==
Genus Apium:

- Apium ammi Urb. var. leptophyllum (Pers.) Chodat & Wilczek, accepted as Cyclospermum leptophyllum (Pers.) Sprague ex Britton & P.Wilson
- Apium decumbens Eckl. & Zeyh. indigenous
- Apium graveolens L. not indigenous, invasive
- Apium integrifolium Hayata, accepted as Apium graveolens L.
- Apium inundatum (L.) Rchb.f. accepted as Helosciadium inundatum (L.) W.D.J.Koch, not indigenous
- Apium leptophyllum (Pers.) F.Muell. ex Benth. accepted as Cyclospermum leptophyllum (Pers.) Sprague ex Britton & P.Wilson

== Arctopus ==
Genus Arctopus:

- Arctopus dregei Sond. endemic
- Arctopus echinatus L. endemic
- Arctopus monacanthus Carmich. ex Sond. endemic

== Berula ==
Genus Berula:

- Berula erecta (Huds.) Coville subsp. thunbergii (DC.) B.L.Burtt, accepted as Berula thunbergii (DC.) H.Wolff, indigenous
- Berula repanda (Hiern) Spalik & S.R.Downie, indigenous
- Berula thunbergii (DC.) H.Wolff, indigenous

== Bupleurum ==
Genus Bupleurum:

- Bupleurum capitatum (L.f.) Thunb. accepted as Hermas capitata L.f.
- Bupleurum ciliatum (L.f.) Thunb. accepted as Hermas ciliata L.f.
- Bupleurum giganteum (L.f.) Thunb. accepted as Hermas gigantea L.f.
- Bupleurum mundii Cham. & Schltdl. indigenous
- Bupleurum quinquedentatum (L.f.) Thunb. accepted as Hermas quinquedentata L.f.
- Bupleurum rotundifolium L. not indigenous
- Bupleurum villosum L. accepted as Hermas villosa (L.) Thunb.

== Buprestis ==
Genus Buprestis:

- Buprestis gigantea (L.f.) Spreng. accepted as Hermas gigantea L.f.

== Capnophyllum ==
Genus Capnophyllum:

- Capnophyllum africanum (L.) Gaertn. endemic
  - Capnophyllum africanum (L.) Gaertn. var. leiocarpon Sond. accepted as Capnophyllum leiocarpon (Sond.) J.C.Manning & Goldblatt
- Capnophyllum leiocarpon (Sond.) J.C.Manning & Goldblatt, endemic
- Capnophyllum lutzeyeri Magee & B.-E.van Wyk, indigenous
- Capnophyllum macrocarpum Magee & B.-E.van Wyk, indigenous

== Carum ==
Genus Carum:

- Carum graveolens (L.) Koso-Pol. accepted as Apium graveolens L.

== Caucalis ==
Genus Caucalis:

- Caucalis platycarpos L. not indigenous

== Celeri ==
Genus Celeri:

- Celeri graveolens (L.) Britton, accepted as Apium graveolens L.

== Centella ==
Genus Centella:

- Centella affinis (Eckl. & Zeyh.) Adamson, indigenous
  - Centella affinis (Eckl. & Zeyh.) Adamson var. affinis, endemic
  - Centella affinis (Eckl. & Zeyh.) Adamson var. oblonga Adamson, endemic
- Centella annua M.T.R.Schub. & B.-E.van Wyk, endemic
- Centella asiatica (L.) Urb. indigenous
- Centella brachycarpa M.T.R.Schub. & B.-E.van Wyk, endemic
- Centella caespitosa Adamson, endemic
- Centella calcaria M.T.R.Schub. & B.-E.van Wyk, indigenous
- Centella calliodus (Cham. & Schltdl.) Drude, indigenous
- Centella capensis (L.) Domin, endemic
  - Centella capensis (L.) Domin var. micrantha Adamson, accepted asCentella annua M.T.R.Schub. & B.-E.van Wyk
- Centella cochlearia (Domin) Adamson, indigenous
- Centella comptonii Adamson, indigenous
- Centella coriacea Nannf. endemic
- Centella cryptocarpa M.T.R.Schub. & B.-E.van Wyk, indigenous
- Centella debilis (Eckl. & Zeyh.) Drude, endemic
- Centella dentata Adamson, endemic
- Centella didymocarpa Adamson, endemic
- Centella difformis (Eckl. & Zeyh.) Adamson, endemic
- Centella dolichocarpa M.T.R.Schub. & B.-E.van Wyk, endemic
- Centella dregeana (Sond.) Domin, accepted as Centella tridentata (L.f.) Drude ex Domin var. dregeana (Sond.) M.T.R.Schub. & B.-E.van Wyk
- Centella eriantha (Rich.) Drude, indigenous
  - Centella eriantha (Rich.) Drude var. eriantha, endemic
  - Centella eriantha (Rich.) Drude var. orientalis Adamson, endemic
  - Centella eriantha (Rich.) Drude var. rotundifolia Adamson, endemic
- Centella flexuosa (Eckl. & Zeyh.) Drude, endemic
- Centella fourcadei Adamson, endemic
- Centella fusca (Eckl. & Zeyh.) Adamson, endemic
- Centella glabrata L. indigenous
  - Centella glabrata L. var. bracteata Adamson, endemic
  - Centella glabrata L. var. glabrata, endemic
  - Centella glabrata L. var. natalensis Adamson, indigenous
- Centella glauca M.T.R.Schub. & B.-E.van Wyk, endemic
- Centella graminifolia Adamson, indigenous
- Centella gymnocarpa M.T.R.Schub. & B.-E.van Wyk, endemic
- Centella hermanniifolia (Eckl. & Zeyh.) Domin, accepted as Centella tridentata (L.f.) Drude ex Domin
  - Centella hermanniifolia (Eckl. & Zeyh.) Domin var. littoralis (Eckl. & Zeyh.) Domin, accepted as Centella tridentata (L.f.) Drude ex Domin var. litoralis (Eckl. & Zeyh.) M.T.R.Schub. & B.-E.van Wyk
- Centella laevis Adamson, endemic
- Centella lanata Compton, endemic
- Centella lasiophylla Adamson, endemic
- Centella linifolia (L.f.) Drude, indigenous
  - Centella linifolia (L.f.) Drude var. depressa Adamson, endemic
  - Centella linifolia (L.f.) Drude var. linifolia, endemic
- Centella longifolia (Adamson) M.T.R.Schub. & B.-E.van Wyk, endemic
- Centella macrocarpa (Rich.) Adamson, indigenous
  - Centella macrocarpa (Rich.) Adamson var. macrocarpa, endemic
  - Centella macrocarpa (Rich.) Adamson var. saxatilis Adamson, endemic
- Centella macrodus (Spreng.) B.L.Burtt, endemic
- Centella montana (Cham. & Schltdl.) Domin, endemic
  - Centella montana (Cham. & Schltdl.) Domin var. longifolia Adamson, accepted as Centella longifolia (Adamson) M.T.R.Schub. & B.-E.van Wyk
- Centella pilosa M.T.R.Schub. & B.-E.van Wyk, endemic
- Centella pottebergensis Adamson, endemic
- Centella recticarpa Adamson, endemic
- Centella restioides Adamson, endemic
- Centella rupestris (Eckl. & Zeyh.) Adamson, endemic
- Centella scabra Adamson, endemic
- Centella sessilis Adamson, endemic
- Centella stenophylla Adamson, endemic
- Centella stipitata Adamson, endemic
- Centella ternata M.T.R.Schub. & B.-E.van Wyk, endemic
- Centella thesioides M.T.R.Schub. & B.-E.van Wyk, endemic
- Centella tridentata (L.f.) Drude ex Domin, indigenous
  - Centella tridentata (L.f.) Drude ex Domin var. dregeana (Sond.) M.T.R.Schub. & B.-E.van Wyk, endemic
  - Centella tridentata (L.f.) Drude ex Domin var. hermanniifolia (Eckl. & Zeyh.) M.T.R.Schub. & B.-E.van Eyk, endemic
  - Centella tridentata (L.f.) Drude ex Domin var. litoralis (Eckl. & Zeyh.) M.T.R.Schub. & B.-E.van Wyk, endemic
  - Centella tridentata (L.f.) Drude ex Domin var. tridentata, endemic
- Centella triloba (Thunb.) Drude, endemic
- Centella umbellata M.T.R.Schub. & B.-E.van Wyk, endemic
- Centella villosa L. indigenous
  - Centella villosa L. var. latifolia (Eckl. & Zeyh.) Adamson, endemic
  - Centella villosa L. var. villosa, endemic
- Centella virgata (L.f.) Drude, indigenous
  - Centella virgata (L.f.) Drude var. congesta Adamson, endemic
  - Centella virgata (L.f.) Drude var. gracilescens Domin, endemic
  - Centella virgata (L.f.) Drude var. virgata, endemic

== Chamarea ==
Genus Chamarea:

- Chamarea capensis (Thunb.) Eckl. & Zeyh. endemic
- Chamarea esterhuyseniae B.L.Burtt. endemic
- Chamarea gracillima (H.Wolff) B.L.Burtt, endemic
- Chamarea longipedicellata B.L.Burtt, indigenous
- Chamarea snijmaniae B.L.Burtt, endemic

== Choritaenia ==
Genus Choritaenia:

- Choritaenia capensis Benth. endemic

== Conium ==
Genus Conium:

- Conium chaerophylloides (Thunb.) Sond. indigenous
- Conium fontanum Hilliard & B.L.Burtt, indigenous
  - Conium fontanum Hilliard & B.L.Burtt var. alticola Hilliard & B.L.Burtt, indigenous
  - Conium fontanum Hilliard & B.L.Burtt var. fontanum, indigenous
  - Conium fontanum Hilliard & B.L.Burtt var. silvaticum Hilliard & B.L.Burtt, endemic
- Conium hilliburttorum Magee & Clark, endemic
- Conium maculatum L. not indigenous
- Conium sp. 4 accepted as Conium hilliburttorum, Magee & Clark
- Conium sphaerocarpum Hilliard & B.L.Burtt, endemic

== Coriandrum ==
Genus Coriandrum:

- Coriandrum sativum L. not indigenous

== Cyclospermum ==
Genus Cyclospermum:

- Cyclospermum leptophyllum (Pers.) Sprague, accepted as Cyclospermum leptophyllum (Pers.) Sprague ex Britton & P.Wilson
- Cyclospermum leptophyllum (Pers.) Sprague ex Britton & P.Wilson, not indigenous

== Cynorhiza ==
Genus Cynorhiza:

- Cynorhiza bolusii Magee & B.-E.van Wyk, indigenous
- Cynorhiza meifolia (Eckl. & Zeyh.) Magee, endemic
- Cynorhiza montana Eckl. & Zeyh. accepted as Cynorhiza typica Eckl. & Zeyh.
- Cynorhiza olifantiana Koso-Pol. accepted as Cynorhiza typica Eckl. & Zeyh.
- Cynorhiza sulcata Eckl. & Zeyh. accepted as Cynorhiza typica Eckl. & Zeyh.
- Cynorhiza typica Eckl. & Zeyh. endemic

== Dasispermum ==
Genus Dasispermum:

- Dasispermum capense (Lam.) Magee & B.-E.van Wyk, endemic
- Dasispermum grandicarpum Magee & B.-E.van Wyk, indigenous
- Dasispermum hispidum (Thunb.) Magee & B.-E.van Wyk, endemic
- Dasispermum humile (Meisn.) Magee & B.-E.van Wyk, endemic
- Dasispermum perennans Magee & B.-E.van Wyk. indigenous
- Dasispermum suffruticosum (P.J.Bergius) B.L.Burtt, endemic
- Dasispermum tenue (Sond.) Magee & B.-E.van Wyk, endemic

== Daucus ==
Genus Daucus:

- Daucus carota L. not indigenous

== Deverra ==
Genus Deverra:

- Deverra burchellii (DC.) Eckl. & Zeyh. indigenous
- Deverra denudata (Viv.) Pfisterer & Podlech, indigenous
  - Deverra denudata (Viv.) Pfisterer & Podlech subsp. aphylla (Cham. & Schltdl.) Pfisterer & Podlech, indigenous

== Diplolophium ==
Genus Diplolophium:

- Diplolophium buchananii (Benth. ex Oliv.) C.Norman subsp. swynnertonii (Baker f.) Cannon, accepted as Diplolophium swynnertonii (Baker f.) C.Norman, indigenous
- Diplolophium swynnertonii (Baker f.) C.Norman, indigenous

== Dracosciadium ==
Genus Dracosciadium:

- Dracosciadium italae Hilliard & B.L.Burtt, endemic
- Dracosciadium saniculifolium Hilliard & B.L.Burtt, endemic

== Ezosciadium ==
Genus Ezosciadium:

- Ezosciadium capense (Eckl. & Zeyh.) B.L.Burtt, endemic

== Ferula ==
Genus Ferula:

- Ferula stricta Spreng. accepted as Nanobubon strictum (Spreng.) Magee

== Foeniculum ==
Genus Foeniculum:

- Foeniculum vulgare Mill. var. vulgare, not indigenous

== Glia ==
Genus Glia:

- Glia decidua B.-E.van Wyk, indigenous
- Glia pilulosa B.-E.van Wyk, indigenous
- Glia prolifera (Burm.f.) B.L.Burtt, endemic

== Helodium ==
Genus Helodium:

- Helodium inundatum (L.) Dumort. accepted as Helosciadium inundatum (L.) W.D.J.Koch

== Helosciadium ==
Genus Helosciadium:

- Helosciadium graveolens (L.) Rojas, accepted as Apium graveolens L.
- Helosciadium inundatum (L.) W.D.J.Koch, not indigenous
- Helosciadium leptophyllum (Pers.) DC. accepted as Cyclospermum leptophyllum (Pers.) Sprague ex Britton & P.Wilson

== Hermas ==
Genus Hermas:

- Hermas capitata L.f. endemic
  - Hermas capitata L.f. var. minima (Eckl. & Zeyh.) Sond. accepted as Hermas capitata L.f.
- Hermas ciliata L.f. endemic
- Hermas depauperata L. accepted as Hermas villosa (L.) Thunb.
- Hermas gigantea L.f. endemic
- Hermas intermedia C.Norman, endemic
- Hermas lanata (Hill) Magee, indigenous
- Hermas minima Eckl. & Zeyh. accepted as Hermas capitata L.f.
- Hermas pillansii C.Norman, accepted as Hermas lanata (Hill) Magee, endemic
- Hermas proterantha B.J.de Villiers, indigenous
- Hermas quercifolia Eckl. & Zeyh. indigenous
- Hermas quinquedentata L.f. endemic
- Hermas uitenhagensis Eckl. & Zeyh. accepted as Hermas ciliata L.f. indigenous
- Hermas villosa (L.) Thunb. indigenous
  - Hermas villosa (L.) Thunb. var. depauperata DC. accepted as Hermas villosa (L.) Thunb.

== Heteromorpha ==
Genus Heteromorpha:

- Heteromorpha arborescens (Spreng.) Cham. & Schltdl. indigenous
  - Heteromorpha arborescens (Spreng.) Cham. & Schltdl. var. abyssinica (Hochst. ex A.Rich.) H.Wolff, indigenous
  - Heteromorpha arborescens (Spreng.) Cham. & Schltdl. var. arborescens endemic
  - Heteromorpha arborescens (Spreng.) Cham. & Schltdl. var. collina (Eckl. & Zeyh.) Sond. endemic
  - Heteromorpha arborescens (Spreng.) Cham. & Schltdl. var. frutescens P.J.D.Winter, indigenous
- Heteromorpha involucrata Conrath, indigenous
- Heteromorpha pubescens Burtt Davy, endemic
- Heteromorpha stenophylla Welw. ex Schinz var. transvaalensis (Schltr. & H.Wolff) P.J.D.Winter, indigenous
- Heteromorpha transvaalensis Schltr. & H.Wolff, accepted as Heteromorpha stenophylla Welw. ex Schinz var. transvaalensis (Schltr. & H.Wolff) P.J.D.Winter
- Heteromorpha trifoliata (H.L.Wendl.) Eckl. & Zeyh. accepted as Heteromorpha arborescens (Spreng.) Cham. & Schltdl. var. abyssinica (Hochst. ex A.Rich.) H.Wolff

== Ifdregea ==
Genus Ifdregea:

- Ifdregea collina (Eckl. & Zeyh.) Steud. accepted as Notobubon collinum (Eckl. & Zeyh.) Magee, indigenous

== Itasina ==
Genus Itasina:

- Itasina filifolia (Thunb.) Raf. endemic

== Lefebvrea ==
Genus Lefebvrea:

- Lefebvrea grantii (Hiern) S.Droop, indigenous

== Lichtensteinia ==
Genus Lichtensteinia:

- Lichtensteinia crassijuga E.Mey. ex Sond. indigenous
- Lichtensteinia globosa B.-E.van Wyk & Tilney, endemic
- Lichtensteinia interrupta (Thunb.) Sond. endemic
- Lichtensteinia kolbeana Bolus, accepted as Lichtensteinia interrupta, (Thunb.) Sond.
- Lichtensteinia lacera Cham. & Schltdl. endemic
- Lichtensteinia latifolia Eckl. & Zeyh. endemic
- Lichtensteinia obscura (Spreng.) Koso-Pol. endemic
- Lichtensteinia trifida Cham. & Schltdl. indigenous
  - Lichtensteinia trifida Cham. & Schltdl. var. palmata (DC.) Sond. endemic
  - Lichtensteinia trifida Cham. & Schltdl. var. pinnatifida Sond. endemic
  - Lichtensteinia trifida Cham. & Schltdl. var. trifida, endemic

== Meum ==
Genus Meum:

- Meum inundatum (L.) Spreng. accepted as Helosciadium inundatum (L.) W.D.J.Koch

== Nanobubon ==
Genus Nanobubon:

- Nanobubon capillaceum (Thunb.) Magee, endemic
- Nanobubon hypogaeum Magee, endemic
- Nanobubon strictum (Spreng.) Magee, endemic
- Notobubon capense (Eckl. & Zeyh.) Magee, indigenous
- Notobubon collinum (Eckl. & Zeyh.) Magee, endemic
- Notobubon ferulaceum (Thunb.) Magee, endemic
- Notobubon galbaniopse (H.Wolff) Magee, endemic
- Notobubon galbanum (L.) Magee, endemic
- Notobubon gummiferum (L.) Magee, endemic
- Notobubon laevigatum (Aiton) Magee, indigenous
- Notobubon montanum (Eckl. & Zeyh.) Magee, endemic
- Notobubon pearsonii (Adamson) Magee, endemic
- Notobubon pungens (Sond.) Magee, endemic
- Notobubon sonderi (M.Hiroe) Magee, endemic
- Notobubon striatum (Thunb.) Magee, endemic
- Notobubon tenuifolium (Thunb.) Magee, endemic

== Oreoselinum ==
Genus Oreoselinum:

- Oreoselinum capense Eckl. & Zeyh. accepted as Notobubon capense (Eckl. & Zeyh.) Magee

== Pastinaca ==
Genus Pastinaca:

- Pastinaca sativa L. not indigenous

== Perfoliata ==
Genus Perfoliata:

- Perfoliata capitata (L.f.) Kuntze, Hermas capitata L.f.
- Perfoliata ciliata (L.f.) Kuntze, accepted as Hermas ciliata L.f.
- Perfoliata gigantea (L.f.) Kuntze, accepted as Hermas gigantea L.f.
- Perfoliata quinquedentata (L.f.) Kuntze, accepted as Hermas quinquedentata L.f.
- Perfoliata villosa (L.) Kuntze, accepted as Hermas villosa (L.) Thunb.

== Petroselinum ==
Genus Petroselinum:

- Petroselinum crispum (Mill.) A.W.Hill, not indigenous

== Peucedanum ==
Genus Peucedanum:

- Peucedanum afrum (Meisn.) E.Phillips, accepted as Afrosciadium afrum (Meisn.) P.J.D.Winter, indigenous
- Peucedanum camdebooense B.L.Burtt, accepted as Notobubon laevigatum (Aiton) Magee, endemic
- Peucedanum capense (Thunb.) Sond. var. capense, accepted as Notobubon laevigatum (Aiton) Magee, indigenous
  - Peucedanum capense (Thunb.) Sond. var. lanceolatum Sond. accepted as Notobubon laevigatum (Aiton) Magee, indigenous
- Peucedanum capillaceum Thunb. accepted as Nanobubon capillaceum (Thunb.) Magee
  - Peucedanum capillaceum Thunb. var. rigidum Sond. accepted as Nanobubon capillaceum (Thunb.) Magee, endemic
- Peucedanum collinum (Eckl. & Zeyh.) D.Dietr. accepted as Notobubon collinum (Eckl. & Zeyh.) Magee, indigenous
- Peucedanum dregeanum D.Dietr. accepted as Notobubon montanum (Eckl. & Zeyh.) Magee, endemic
- Peucedanum ecklonis Walp. accepted as Nanobubon capillaceum (Thunb.) Magee
- Peucedanum ferulaceum (Thunb.) Eckl. & Zeyh. var. ferulaceum, accepted as Notobubon ferulaceum (Thunb.) Magee, endemic
- Peucedanum ferulaceum (Thunb.) Eckl. & Zeyh. var. stadense (Eckl. & Zeyh.) Sond. accepted as Notobubon ferulaceum (Thunb.) Magee, endemic
- Peucedanum galbaniopse H.Wolff, accepted as Notobubon galbaniopse (H.Wolff) Magee
- Peucedanum gummiferum (L.) Wijnands, accepted as Notobubon gummiferum (L.) Magee, endemic
- Peucedanum hypoleucum (Meisn.) Drude, accepted as Notobubon tenuifolium (Thunb.) Magee
- Peucedanum kamiesbergense B.L.Burtt, accepted as Notobubon capense (Eckl. & Zeyh.) Magee, endemic
- Peucedanum lateriflorum (Eckl. & Zeyh.) Sond. accepted as Annesorhiza lateriflora (Eckl. & Zeyh.) B.-E.van Wyk
- Peucedanum magalismontanum Sond. accepted as Afrosciadium magalismontanum (Sond.) P.J.D.Winter, indigenous
- Peucedanum millefolium Sond. accepted as Cynorhiza meifolia (Eckl. & Zeyh.) Magee, endemic
- Peucedanum multiradiatum Drude, accepted as Notobubon capense (Eckl. & Zeyh.) Magee
- Peucedanum natalense (Sond.) Engl. accepted as Afrosciadium natalense (Sond.) P.J.D.Winter, endemic
- Peucedanum olifantianum (Koso-Pol.) M.Hiroe, accepted as Cynorhiza typica Eckl. & Zeyh. indigenous
- Peucedanum pearsonii Adamson accepted as Notobubon pearsonii (Adamson) Magee, endemic
- Peucedanum platycarpum E.Mey. ex Sond. accepted as Afrosciadium platycarpum (Sond.) P.J.D.Winter, endemic
- Peucedanum polyactinum B.L.Burtt, accepted as Notobubon capense (Eckl. & Zeyh.) Magee
- Peucedanum pungens E.Mey. ex Sond. accepted as Notobubon pungens (Sond.) Magee, endemic
- Peucedanum rigidum Eckl. & Zeyh. accepted as Nanobubon capillaceum (Thunb.) Magee
- Peucedanum sieberianum Sond. accepted as Nanobubon strictum (Spreng.) Magee
- Peucedanum sonderi (M.Hiroe) B.L.Burtt, accepted as Notobubon sonderi (M.Hiroe) Magee
- Peucedanum striatum (Thunb.) Sond. accepted as Notobubon striatum (Thunb.) Magee, endemic
- Peucedanum strictum (Spreng.) B.L.Burtt, accepted as Nanobubon strictum (Spreng.) Magee, endemic
- Peucedanum sulcatum Eckl. & Zeyh. ex Sond. accepted as Cynorhiza typica Eckl. & Zeyh. endemic
- Peucedanum tenuifolium Thunb. accepted as Notobubon tenuifolium (Thunb.) Magee, endemic
- Peucedanum thodei T.H.Arnold, accepted as Afroligusticum thodei (T.H.Arnold) P.J.D.Winter, indigenous
- Peucedanum triternatum Eckl. & Zeyh. accepted as Annesorhiza triternata (Eckl. & Zeyh.) Vessio, Tilney & B.-E.van Wyk, endemic
- Peucedanum typicum (Eckl. & Zeyh.) B.L.Burtt, accepted as Cynorhiza typica Eckl. & Zeyh. endemic
- Peucedanum upingtoniae (Schinz) Drude, accepted as Lefebvrea grantii (Hiern) S.Droop, indigenous
- Peucedanum wilmsianum H.Wolff, accepted as Afroligusticum wilmsianum (H.Wolff) P.J.D.Winter, endemic
- Peucedanum zeyheri Steud. accepted as Nanobubon capillaceum (Thunb.) Magee

== Pimpinella ==
Genus Pimpinella:

- Pimpinella afra (Eckl. & Zeyh.) D.Dietr. indigenous
- Pimpinella hydrophila H.Wolff, endemic
- Pimpinella krookii H.Wolff, endemic
- Pimpinella leptophylla Pers. accepted as Cyclospermum leptophyllum (Pers.) Sprague ex Britton & P.Wilson
- Pimpinella reenensis Rech.f. accepted as Pimpinella stadensis (Eckl. & Zeyh.) D.Dietr.
- Pimpinella schlechteri H.Wolff, endemic
- Pimpinella stadensis (Eckl. & Zeyh.) D.Dietr. indigenous
- Pimpinella transvaalensis H.Wolff, indigenous

== Polemannia ==
Genus Polemannia:

- Polemannia grossulariifolia Eckl. & Zeyh. endemic
- Polemannia montana Schltr. & H.Wolff, indigenous
- Polemannia simplicior Hilliard & B.L.Burtt, indigenous

== Polemanniopsis ==
Genus Polemanniopsis:

- Polemanniopsis marlothii (H.Wolff) B.L.Burtt, endemic

== Ptychotis ==
Genus Ptychotis:

- Ptychotis carvifolia Sond. accepted as Carum carvifolium Benth. & Hook.f.

== Sanicula ==
Genus Sanicula:

- Sanicula elata Buch.-Ham. ex D.Don, indigenous

== Scaraboides ==
Genus Scaraboides:

- Scaraboides manningii Magee & B.-E.van Wyk, endemic

== Seseli ==
Genus Seseli:

- Seseli graveolens (L.) Scop. accepted as Apium graveolens L.
- Seseli striatum Thunb. accepted as Notobubon striatum (Thunb.) Magee, indigenous

== Sison ==
Genus Sison:

- Sison inundatum L. accepted as Helosciadium inundatum (L.) W.D.J.Koch

== Sium ==
Genus Sium:

- Sium apium Roth, accepted as Apium graveolens L.
- Sium graveolens (L.) Vest, accepted as Apium graveolens L.
- Sium inundatum (L.) Lam. accepted as Helosciadium inundatum (L.) W.D.J.Koch
- Sium repandum Hiern, accepted as Berula repanda (Hiern) Spalik & S.R.Downie, indigenous
- Sium thunbergii DC. accepted as Berula thunbergii (DC.) H.Wolff

== Sonderina ==
Genus Sonderina:

- Sonderina caruifolia (Sond.) H.Wolff, accepted as Dasispermum hispidum (Thunb.) Magee & B.-E.van Wyk, endemic
- Sonderina hispida (Thunb.) H.Wolff, accepted as Dasispermum hispidum (Thunb.) Magee & B.-E.van Wyk, endemic
- Sonderina humilis (Meisn.) H.Wolff accepted as Dasispermum humile (Meisn.) Magee & B.-E.van Wyk, endemic
- Sonderina streyi Merxm. accepted as Anginon streyi (Merxm.) I.Allison & B.-E.van Wyk
- Sonderina tenuis (Sond.) H.Wolff, accepted as Dasispermum tenue (Sond.) Magee & B.-E.van Wyk, endemic

== Steganotaenia ==
Genus Steganotaenia:

- Steganotaenia araliacea Hochst. indigenous
  - Steganotaenia araliacea Hochst. var. araliacea, indigenous

== Stenosemis ==
Genus Stenosemis:

- Stenosemis angustifolia E.Mey. ex Sond. endemic
- Stenosemis caffra (Eckl. & Zeyh.) Sond. endemic

== Stoibrax ==
Genus Stoibrax:

- Stoibrax capense (Lam.) B.L.Burtt, accepted as Dasispermum capense (Lam.) Magee & B.-E.van Wyk, endemic

== Torilis ==
Genus Torilis:

- Torilis arvensis (Huds.) Link, not indigenous
- Torilis nodosa (L.) Gaertn. not indigenous

== Turgenia ==
Genus Turgenia:

- Turgenia latifolia (L.) Hoffm. not indigenous, invasive
