= List of Apiales of South Africa =

List of flowering plants in the order Apiales recorded from South Africa

The Apiales are an order of flowering plants. The families are those recognized in the APG III system. This is typical of the newer classifications, though there is some slight variation and in particular, the Torriceliaceae may be divided. Under this definition, well-known members include carrots, celery, and parsley. The order Apiales is placed within the asterid group of eudicots as circumscribed by the APG III system. Within the asterids, Apiales belongs to an unranked group called the campanulids, and within the campanulids, it belongs to a clade known in phylogenetic nomenclature as Apiidae. In 2010, a subclade of Apiidae named Dipsapiidae was defined to consist of the three orders: Apiales, Paracryphiales, and Dipsacales.

The anthophytes are a grouping of plant taxa bearing flower-like reproductive structures. They were formerly thought to be a clade comprising plants bearing flower-like structures. The group contained the angiosperms - the extant flowering plants, such as roses and grasses - as well as the Gnetales and the extinct Bennettitales.

23,420 species of vascular plant have been recorded in South Africa, making it the sixth most species-rich country in the world and the most species-rich country on the African continent. Of these, 153 species are considered to be threatened. Nine biomes have been described in South Africa: Fynbos, Succulent Karoo, desert, Nama Karoo, grassland, savanna, Albany thickets, the Indian Ocean coastal belt, and forests.

The 2018 South African National Biodiversity Institute's National Biodiversity Assessment plant checklist lists 35,130 taxa in the phyla Anthocerotophyta (hornworts (6)), Anthophyta (flowering plants (33534)), Bryophyta (mosses (685)), Cycadophyta (cycads (42)), Lycopodiophyta (Lycophytes(45)), Marchantiophyta (liverworts (376)), Pinophyta (conifers (33)), and Pteridophyta (cryptogams (408)).

Three families are represented in the literature. Listed taxa include species, subspecies, varieties, and forms as recorded, some of which have subsequently been allocated to other taxa as synonyms, in which cases the accepted taxon is appended to the listing. Multiple entries under alternative names reflect taxonomic revision over time.

== Apiaceae ==
Family: Apiaceae, 65 genera have been recorded. Not all are necessarily currently accepted.

- Genus Aethusa:
- Genus Afroligusticum:
- Genus Afrosciadium:
- Genus Agrocharis:
- Genus Alepidea:
- Genus Ammi:
- Genus Anginon:
- Genus Annesorhiza:
- Genus Anthriscus:
- Genus Apium:
- Genus Arctopus:
- Genus Berula:
- Genus Bupleurum:
- Genus Buprestis:
- Genus Capnophyllum:
- Genus Carum:
- Genus Caucalis:
- Genus Celeri:
- Genus Centella:
- Genus Chamarea:
- Genus Choritaenia:
- Genus Conium:
- Genus Coriandrum:
- Genus Cyclospermum:
- Genus Cynorhiza:
- Genus Dasispermum:
- Genus Daucus:
- Genus Deverra:
- Genus Diplolophium:
- Genus Dracosciadium:
- Genus Ezosciadium:
- Genus Ferula:
- Genus Foeniculum:
- Genus Glia:
- Genus Helodium:
- Genus Helosciadium:
- Genus Hermas:
- Genus Heteromorpha:
- Genus Ifdregea:
- Genus Itasina:
- Genus Lefebvrea:
- Genus Lichtensteinia:
- Genus Meum:
- Genus Nanobubon:
- Genus Oreoselinum:
- Genus Pastinaca:
- Genus Perfoliata:
- Genus Petroselinum:
- Genus Peucedanum:
- Genus Pimpinella:
- Genus Polemannia:
- Genus Polemanniopsis:
- Genus Ptychotis:
- Genus Sanicula:
- Genus Scaraboides:
- Genus Seseli:
- Genus Sison:
- Genus Sium:
- Genus Sonderina:
- Genus Steganotaenia:
- Genus Stenosemis:
- Genus Stoibrax:
- Genus Torilis:
- Genus Turgenia:

== Araliaceae ==
Family: Araliaceae,

=== Aralia ===
Genus Aralia:

- Aralia spinosa L. not indigenous, cultivated

=== Cussonia ===
Genus Cussonia:

- Cussonia arenicola Strey, indigenous
- Cussonia gamtoosensis Strey, endemic
- Cussonia natalensis Sond. indigenous
- Cussonia nicholsonii Strey, endemic
- Cussonia paniculata Eckl. & Zeyh. indigenous
  - Cussonia paniculata Eckl. & Zeyh. subsp. paniculata, endemic
  - Cussonia paniculata Eckl. & Zeyh. subsp. sinuata (Reyneke & Kok) De Winter, indigenous
- Cussonia sphaerocephala Strey, indigenous
- Cussonia spicata Thunb. indigenous
- Cussonia thyrsiflora Thunb. endemic
- Cussonia transvaalensis Reyneke, endemic
- Cussonia zuluensis Strey, indigenous

=== Dizygotheca ===
Genus Dizygotheca:

- Dizygotheca elegantissima (Veitch ex Mast.) R.Vig. & Guill. accepted as Plerandra elegantissima (Veitch ex Mast.) Lowry & Frodin, not indigenous

=== Hedera ===
Genus Hedera:

- Hedera canariensis Willd. not indigenous, cultivated
- Hedera helix L. not indigenous, invasive

=== Heptapleurum ===
Genus Heptapleurum:

- Heptapleurum actinophyllum (Endl.) Harms, not indigenous, invasive
- Heptapleurum arboricola (Hayata) Merr. not indigenous, invasive

=== Neocussonia ===
Genus Neocussonia:

- Neocussonia umbellifera (Sond.) Baill. indigenous

=== Plerandra ===
Genus Plerandra:

- Plerandra elegantissima (Veitch ex Mast.) Lowry & Frodin, not indigenous, invasive

=== Seemannaralia ===
Genus Seemannaralia:

- Seemannaralia gerrardii (Seem.) Harms, endemic

=== Trichoneura ===
Genus Trichoneura:

- Trichoneura bonariensis Lam. indigenous
- Hydrocotyle inundata (L.) Sm. accepted as Helosciadium inundatum (L.) W.D.J.Koch
- Hydrocotyle schlechteri H.Wolff, endemic
- Hydrocotyle sibthorpioides Lam. indigenous
- Hydrocotyle verticillata Thunb. indigenous

== Pittosporaceae ==
Family: Pittosporaceae,

=== Billardiera ===
Genus Billardiera:

- Billardiera heterophylla Lindl. not indigenous, invasive

=== Hymenosporum ===
Genus Hymenosporum:

- Hymenosporum flavum (Hook.) R.Br. ex F.Muell. not indigenous

=== Pittosporum ===
Genus Pittosporum:

- Pittosporum crassifolium Banks & Sol. ex A.Cunn. not indigenous, invasive
- Pittosporum undulatum Vent. not indigenous, invasive
- Pittosporum viridiflorum Sims, indigenous
