= False carrot =

False carrot is a common name for several plants and may refer to:

- Turgenia
- Yabea
