= Heteromorpha =

Heteromorpha is the scientific name of two genera of organisms and may refer to:

- Heteromorpha (moth), a genus of moths in the family Eupterotidae
- Heteromorpha (plant), a genus of plants in the family Apiaceae
