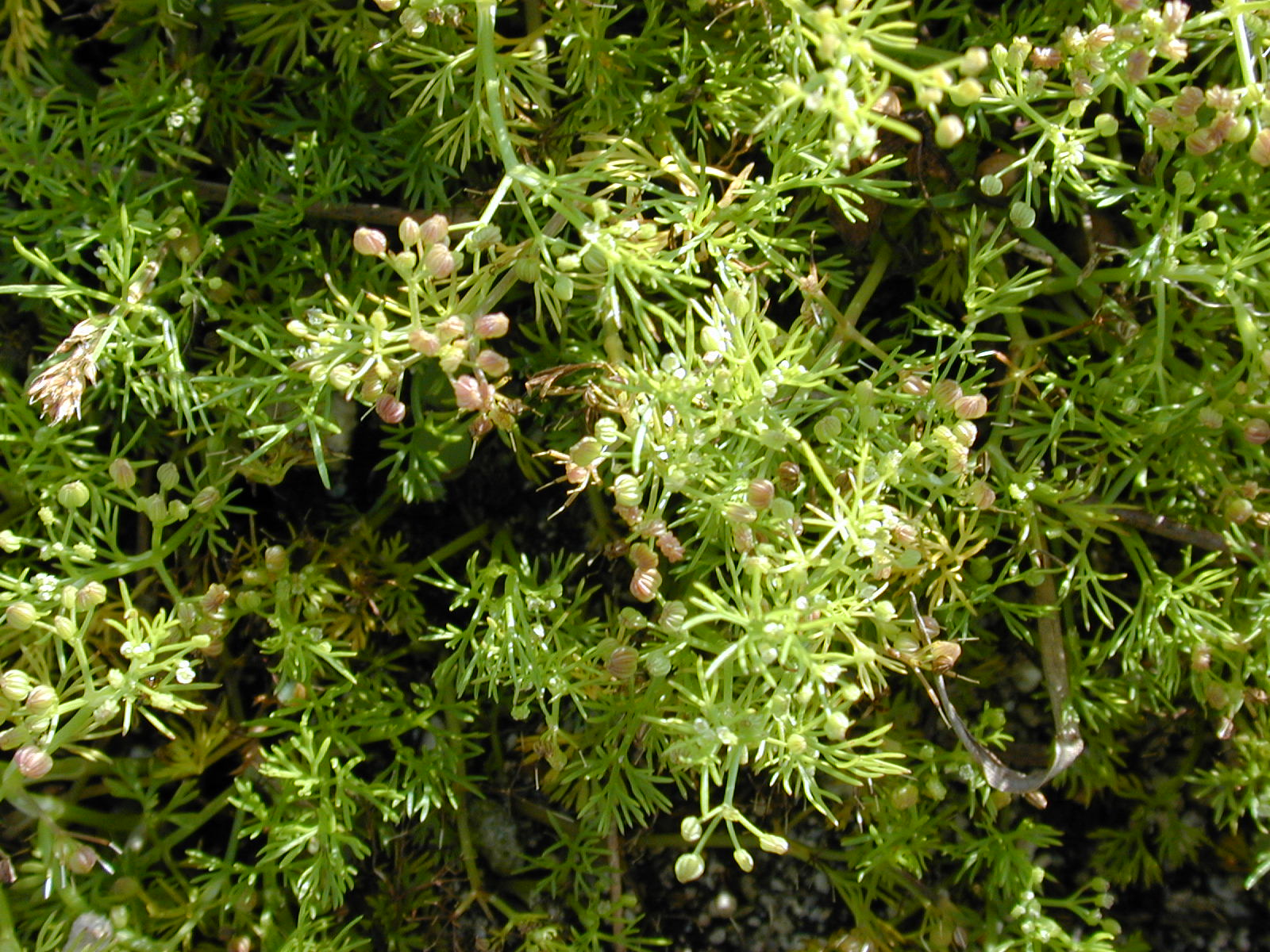

Scientific classification
- Kingdom: Plantae
- Clade: Tracheophytes
- Clade: Angiosperms
- Clade: Eudicots
- Clade: Asterids
- Order: Apiales
- Family: Apiaceae
- Genus: Cyclospermum
- Species: C. leptophyllum

Binomial name
- Cyclospermum leptophyllum (Pers.) Sprague ex Britton & P. Wils.

Synonyms
- Apium leptophyllum Apium tenuifolium Cyclospermum ammi

= Cyclospermum leptophyllum =

Species of flowering plant

Cyclospermum leptophyllum (also, Ciclospermum l.) is a species of plant in the family Apiaceae known by the common names marsh parsley, slender celery and fir-leaved celery. This is a plant found worldwide at warm temperate to tropical latitudes and is considered a noxious weed in many areas. It is a taprooted branching herb reaching just over half a meter in height at maximum. It has threadlike green leaves a few centimeters long and small umbels of spherical flowers. Host plant for Eastern Black Swallowtail butterflies.

The 1889 book 'The Useful Native Plants of Australia’ records that a common name included "Wild Parsley" and that "It is worthy of note that this plant (in common with others of the genus) is sometimes acrid and injurious when grown in damp soils. It is, doubtless, capable of much improvement by careful cultivation. This plant is not endemic to Australia."
