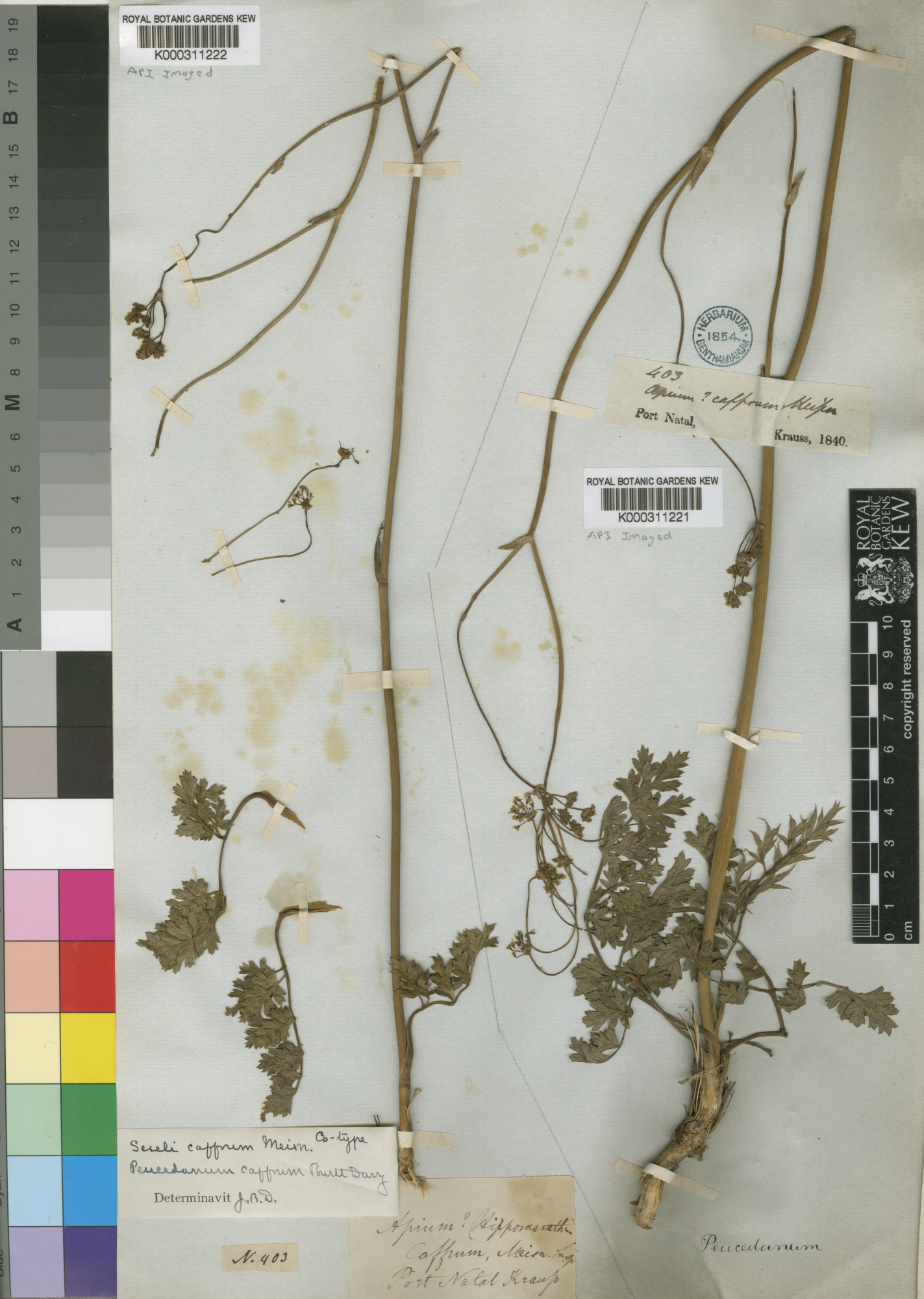

Scientific classification
- Kingdom: Plantae
- Clade: Tracheophytes
- Clade: Angiosperms
- Clade: Eudicots
- Clade: Asterids
- Order: Apiales
- Family: Apiaceae
- Genus: Afrosciadium
- Species: A. afrum

Binomial name
- Afrosciadium afrum (Meisn.) P.J.D.Winter (2008)

Synonyms
- Annesorhiza afra (Meisn.) Benth. & Hook.f. ex B.D.Jacks.; Peucedanum afrum (Meisn.) E.Phillips; Peucedanum connatum E.Mey. ex Sond.; Peucedanum meisnerianum MacOwan ex Engl.; Seseli afrum Meisn.; Afrosciadium caffrum

= Afrosciadium afrum =

Species of flowering plant

Afrosciadium afrum is a member of the carrot family, Apiaceae. It is a perennial tuberous herb native to subtropical regions of South Africa and Lesotho.

== Taxonomy ==
Afrosciadium afrum has previously been known under various synonyms before the genus Afrosciadium was established in 2008. The etymology of the original species name caffrum is related to kaffir, an ethnic slur used towards black people in Africa. At the July 2024 International Botanical Congress, a vote was held with the result that "caffrum" related names will be emended to afrum related ones, with the implementation of this happening at the end of July 2024.
