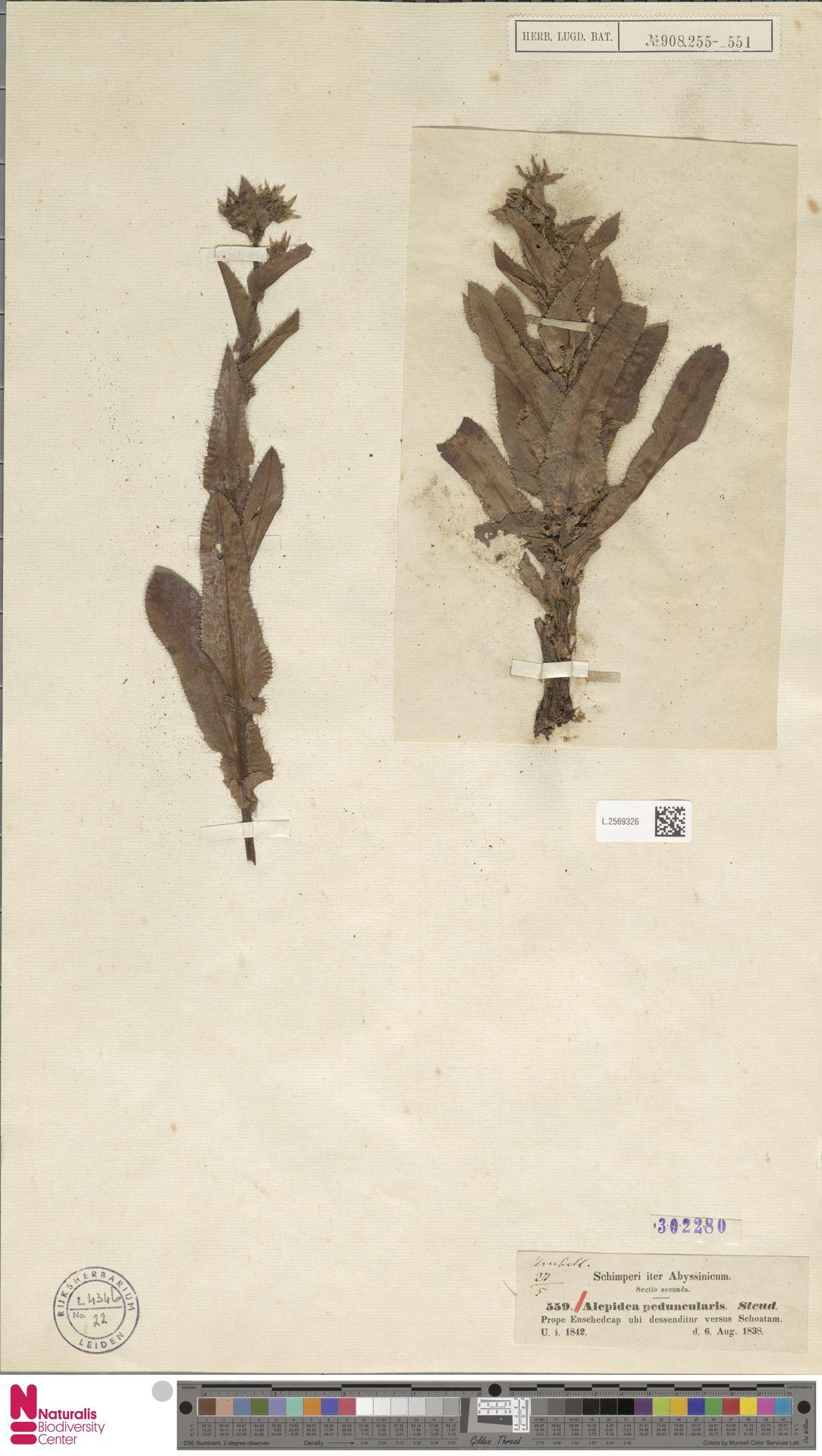
- Herbarium sheet of the type specimen of Alepidea peduncularis

Scientific classification
- Kingdom: Plantae
- Clade: Tracheophytes
- Clade: Angiosperms
- Clade: Eudicots
- Clade: Asterids
- Order: Apiales
- Family: Apiaceae
- Genus: Alepidea
- Species: A. peduncularis

Binomial name
- Alepidea peduncularis A.Rich.

= Alepidea peduncularis =

Species of flowering plant

Alepidea peduncularis is an edible perennial herb native to the montane grasslands of East and South Africa.

== Growth ==
The plant bears a flowering stalk about 70 cm in height, and a basal rosette of leaves with distinctively fringed margins. The leaves are edible, and the roots are used in medicine.
