= Anginon streyi =

Conservation status
- Least Concern (IUCN 3.1)

Scientific classification
- Kingdom: Plantae
- Clade: Tracheophytes
- Clade: Angiosperms
- Clade: Eudicots
- Clade: Asterids
- Order: Apiales
- Family: Apiaceae
- Genus: Anginon
- Species: A. streyi

Binomial name
- Anginon streyi (Merxm.) I.Allison & B.-E.van Wyk

Synonyms
- Carum streyi (Merxm.) M.Hiroe; Sonderina streyi Merxm.

Species of flowering plant

Anginon streyi is a species of flowering plant in the family Apiaceae. It is endemic to Namibia. Its natural habitat is subtropical or tropical dry shrubland.
