= Capnophyllum =

Scientific classification
- Kingdom: Plantae
- Clade: Tracheophytes
- Clade: Angiosperms
- Clade: Eudicots
- Clade: Asterids
- Order: Apiales
- Family: Apiaceae
- Subfamily: Apioideae
- Tribe: Tordylieae
- Genus: Capnophyllum; Gaertn.

Species
- See text

Synonyms
- Abioton Raf.; Actinocladus E.Mey.

Genus of flowering plants

Capnophyllum is a genus of flowering plant in the Apiaceae. It contains four species. They are endemic to southern Africa, particularly near the Cape of Good Hope.

== Species ==
- Capnophyllum africanum (L.) Gaertn.
- Capnophyllum leiocarpon (Sond.) J.C.Manning & Goldblatt
- Capnophyllum lutzeyeri Magee & B.-E.van Wyk
- Capnophyllum macrocarpum Magee & B.-E.van Wyk
