= Ezosciadium =

Scientific classification
- Kingdom: Plantae
- Clade: Tracheophytes
- Clade: Angiosperms
- Clade: Eudicots
- Clade: Asterids
- Order: Apiales
- Family: Apiaceae
- Subfamily: Apioideae
- Tribe: Annesorhizeae
- Genus: Ezosciadium; B.L.Burtt
- Species: E. capense

Binomial name
- Ezosciadium capense (Eckl. & Zeyh.) B.L.Burtt

Genus of flowering plants

Ezosciadium is a genus of flowering plants belonging to the family Apiaceae. It contains a single species, Ezosciadium capense.

Its native range is South African Republic.
