= Stenosemis =

Scientific classification
- Kingdom: Plantae
- Clade: Tracheophytes
- Clade: Angiosperms
- Clade: Eudicots
- Clade: Asterids
- Order: Apiales
- Family: Apiaceae
- Subfamily: Apioideae
- Tribe: Tordylieae
- Genus: Stenosemis; E.Mey. ex Sond.

Genus of plants

Stenosemis is a genus of flowering plants belonging to the family Apiaceae.

Its native range is Southern Africa.

== Species ==
Species:

- Stenosemis angustifolia E.Mey. ex Sond.
- Stenosemis caffra (Eckl. & Zeyh.) Sond.
