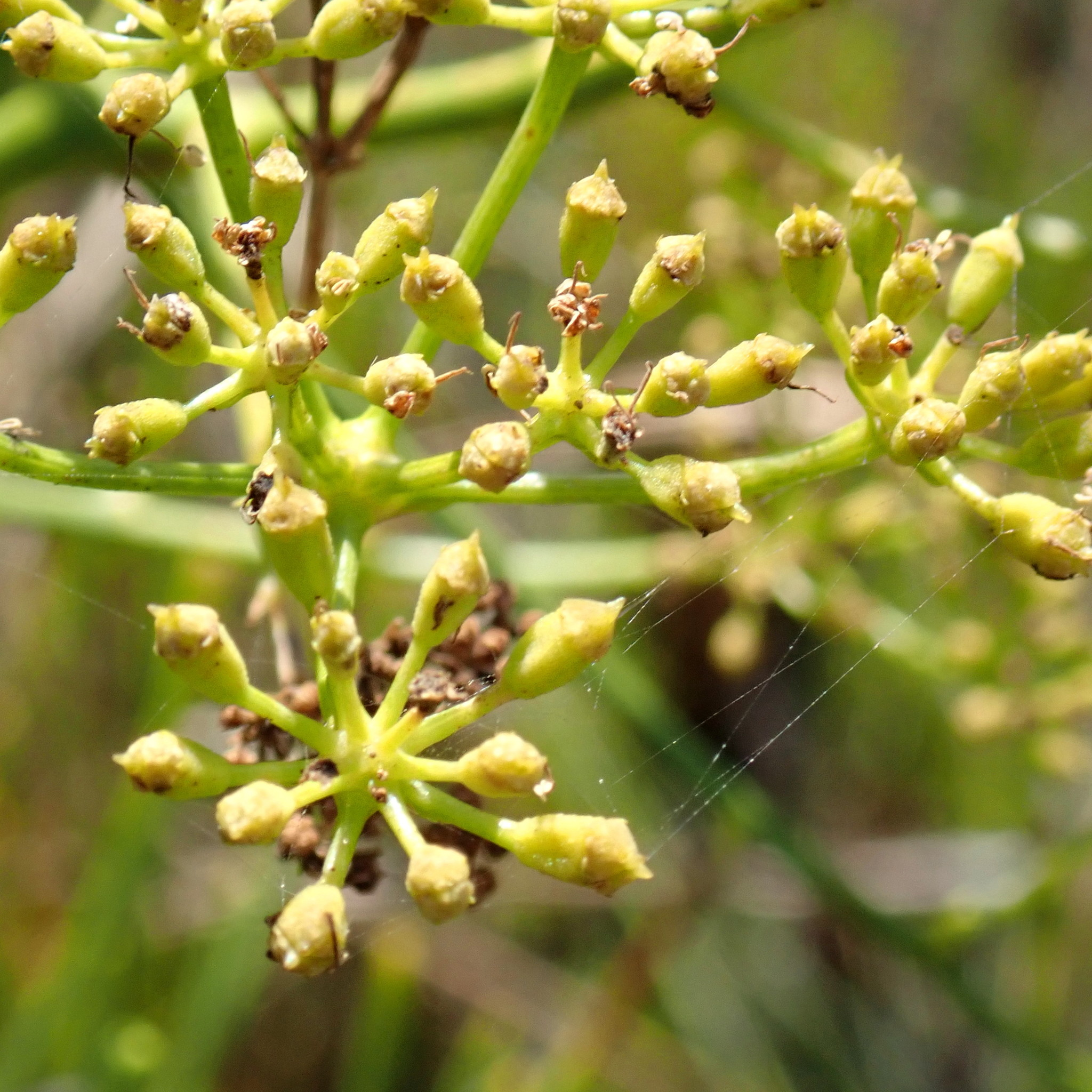
- Anginon difforme

Scientific classification
- Kingdom: Plantae
- Clade: Tracheophytes
- Clade: Angiosperms
- Clade: Eudicots
- Clade: Asterids
- Order: Apiales
- Family: Apiaceae
- Subfamily: Apioideae
- Tribe: Heteromorpheae
- Genus: Anginon; Raf.

Species
- See text.

Synonyms
- Lepiselinum C.Presl; Lepisma E.Mey., not validly publ.; Rhyticarpus Sond.

= Anginon =

Genus of flowering plants

Anginon is a genus of flowering plant in the family Apiaceae. It is endemic to southern Africa.

== Species ==
As of December 2022, Plants of the World Online accepted the following species:

- Anginon difforme (L.) B.L.Burtt
- Anginon fruticosum I.Allison & B.-E.van Wyk
- Anginon intermedium I.Allison & B.-E.van Wyk
- Anginon jaarsveldii B.L.Burtt
- Anginon paniculatum (Thunb.) B.L.Burtt
- Anginon pumilum I.Allison & B.-E.van Wyk
- Anginon rugosum (Thunb.) Raf.
- Anginon streyi (Merxm.) I.Allison & B.-E.van Wyk
- Anginon swellendamense (Eckl. & Zeyh.) B.L.Burtt
- Anginon tenuius I.Allison & B.-E.van Wyk
- Anginon ternatum I.Allison & B.-E.van Wyk
- Anginon verticillatum (Sond.) B.L.Burtt
