= Ptychotis =

Scientific classification
- Kingdom: Plantae
- Clade: Embryophytes
- Clade: Tracheophytes
- Clade: Spermatophytes
- Clade: Angiosperms
- Clade: Eudicots
- Clade: Asterids
- Order: Apiales
- Family: Apiaceae
- Genus: Ptychotis; W.D.J.Koch

Genus of plants

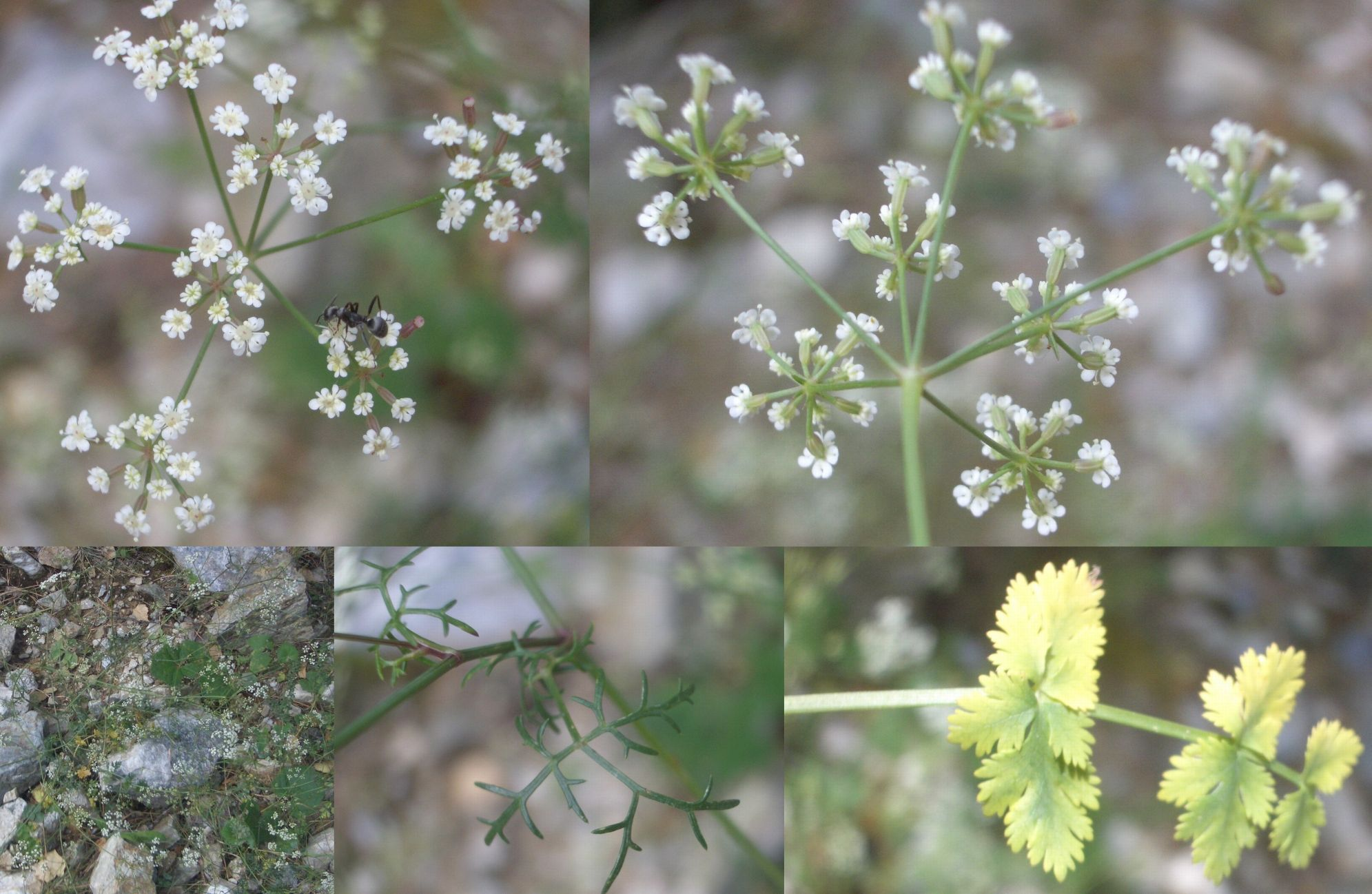
Ptychotis saxifraga - Apiaceae - multiple views

Ptychotis is a genus of flowering plants belonging to the family Apiaceae.

Its native range is Southwestern and Southern Central Europe.

Species:

- Ptychotis sardoa Pignatti & Metlesics
- Ptychotis saxifraga (L.) Loret & Barrandon
