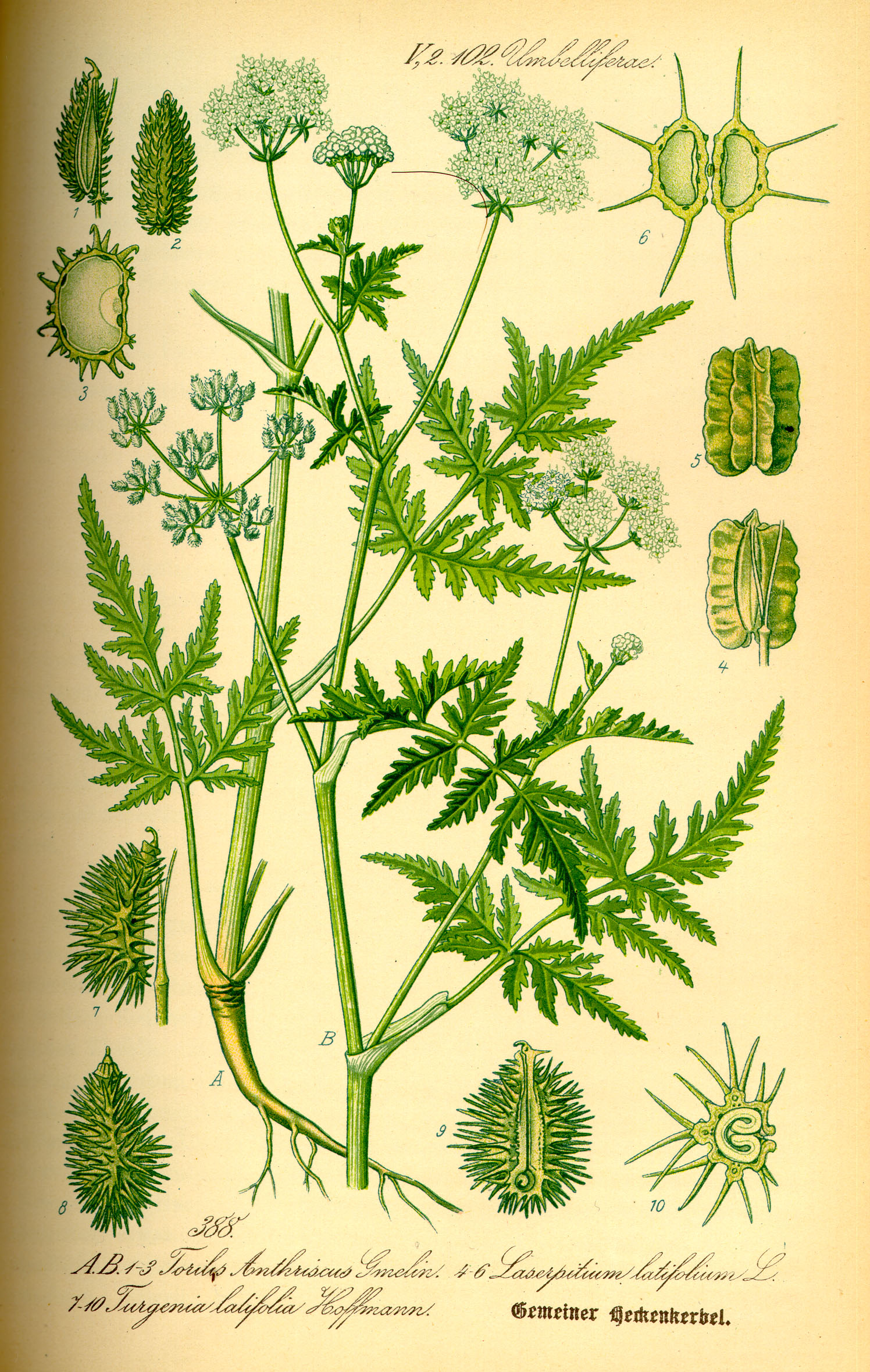
- Turgenia latifolia

Scientific classification
- Kingdom: Plantae
- Clade: Tracheophytes
- Clade: Angiosperms
- Clade: Eudicots
- Clade: Asterids
- Order: Apiales
- Family: Apiaceae
- Subfamily: Apioideae
- Tribe: Scandiceae
- Subtribe: Torilidinae
- Genus: Turgenia; Hoffm.

Species
- Turgenia brachyacantha Boiss.; Turgenia foeniculacea Fenzl; Turgenia heterocarpa DC.; Turgenia latifolia Hoffm.; Turgenia lisaeoides C.C.Towns.; Turgenia multiflora DC.; Turgenia tuberculata Boiss.

= Turgenia =

Genus of flowering plants

Turgenia is a genus of flowering plants in the family Apiaceae, containing up to seven species. The genus resembles Caucalis. False carrot is a common name for plants in this genus.

Varieties of Turgenia can be found in areas of Africa, Europe, temperate and tropical regions of Asia, and North America.

The genus name of Turgenia is in honour of Alexander Turgenev (1784–1845), a Russian statesman and historian. It was first described and published in Gen. Pl. Umbell. on page 59 in 1814.
