= Stoibrax =

Scientific classification
- Kingdom: Plantae
- Clade: Tracheophytes
- Clade: Angiosperms
- Clade: Eudicots
- Clade: Asterids
- Order: Apiales
- Family: Apiaceae
- Subfamily: Apioideae
- Tribe: Apieae
- Genus: Stoibrax; Raf.

Genus of plants

Stoibrax is a genus of flowering plants belonging to the family Apiaceae.

Its native range is Spain, Northern Africa.

== Species ==
Species:

- Stoibrax dichotomum (L.) Raf.
- Stoibrax hanotei (Braun-Blanq. & Maire) B.L.Burtt
- Stoibrax pomelianum (Maire) B.L.Burtt
