= Chamarea =

Scientific classification
- Kingdom: Plantae
- Clade: Tracheophytes
- Clade: Angiosperms
- Clade: Eudicots
- Clade: Asterids
- Order: Apiales
- Family: Apiaceae
- Subfamily: Apioideae
- Tribe: Annesorhizeae
- Genus: Chamarea; Eckl. & Zeyh.

Species
- Chamarea capensis; Chamarea esterhuyseniae; Chamarea gracillima; Chamarea longipedicellata; Chamarea snijmaniae

Synonyms
- Schlechterosciadium H.Wolff; Trachysciadium (DC.) Eckl. & Zeyh.

Genus of flowering plants

Chamarea is a genus of flowering plant in the Apiaceae, with 5 species. It is found in southern Africa.
