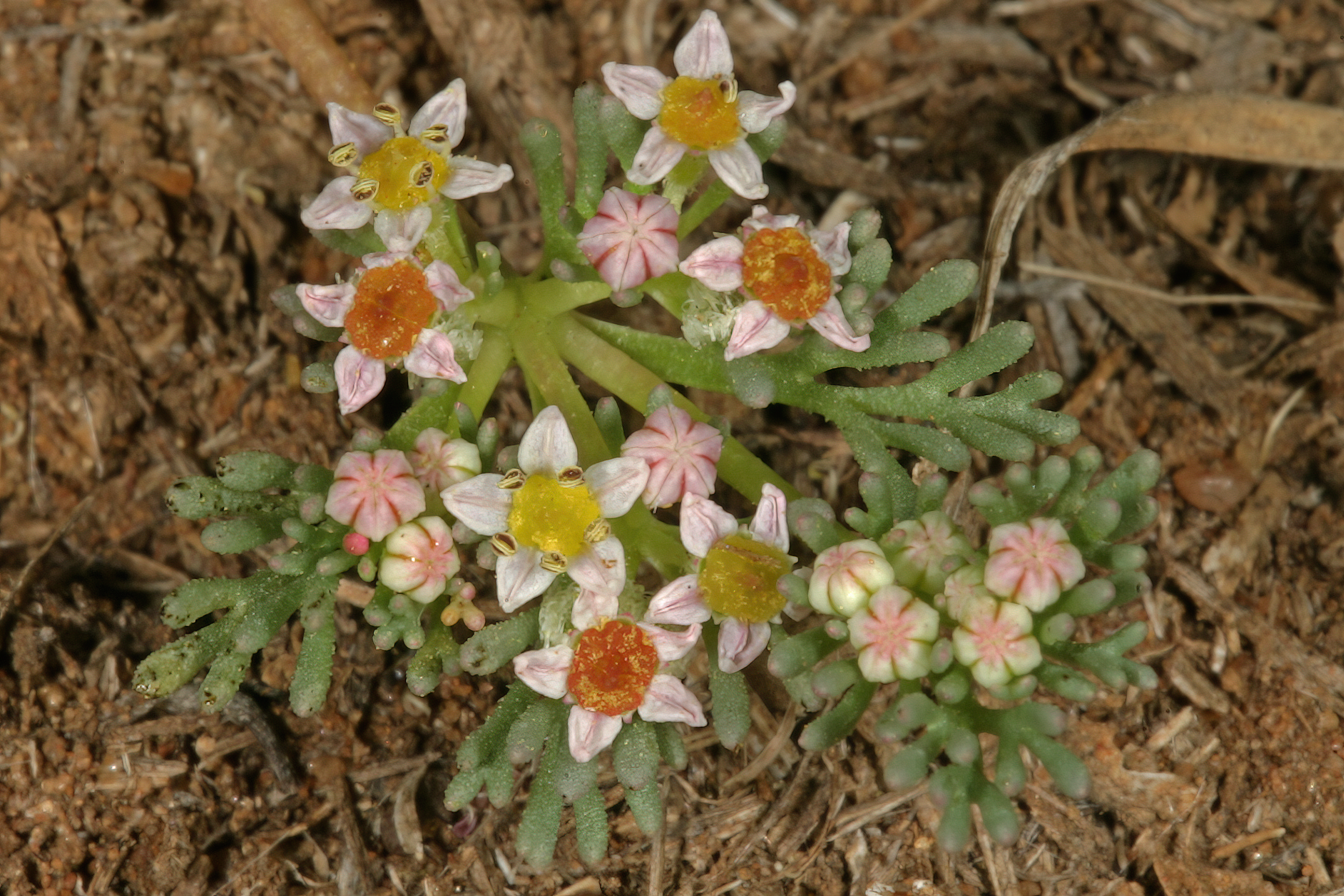
- Choritaenia capensis

Scientific classification
- Kingdom: Plantae
- Clade: Tracheophytes
- Clade: Angiosperms
- Clade: Eudicots
- Clade: Asterids
- Order: Apiales
- Family: Apiaceae
- Subfamily: Apioideae
- Tribe: Choritaenieae; Magee, C.I.Calviño, Mei Liu, S.R.Downie, Tilney & B.-E.van Wyk
- Genus: Choritaenia; Benth.
- Species: C. capensis

Binomial name
- Choritaenia capensis (Sond.) Burtt Davy

= Choritaenia =

Genus of flowering plants

Choritaenia capensis is a species of flowering plant in the Apiaceae, of the monotypic genus Choritaenia. It is endemic to central parts of southern Africa. Individuals are usually reported from disturbed areas, such as roadsides, flood plains, and dry dams. It flowers in the spring and early summer. It is distinct for containing several morphological features that are not seen in any of the other genera of the family Apiaceae. Its fruits have a dense vestiture and hygroscopic carpophore that may be an adaptation that allows the plant to respond rapidly to the earliest spring rains.
