= Dracosciadium =

Scientific classification
- Kingdom: Plantae
- Clade: Tracheophytes
- Clade: Angiosperms
- Clade: Eudicots
- Clade: Asterids
- Order: Apiales
- Family: Apiaceae
- Subfamily: Apioideae
- Tribe: Heteromorpheae
- Genus: Dracosciadium; Hilliard & B.L.Burtt

Genus of plants

Dracosciadium is a genus of flowering plants belonging to the family Apiaceae.

Its native range is KwaZulu-Natal.

Species:

- Dracosciadium italae Hilliard & B.L.Burtt
- Dracosciadium saniculifolium Hilliard & B.L.Burtt
