= Nanobubon =

Scientific classification
- Kingdom: Plantae
- Clade: Tracheophytes
- Clade: Angiosperms
- Clade: Eudicots
- Clade: Asterids
- Order: Apiales
- Family: Apiaceae
- Subfamily: Apioideae
- Tribe: Tordylieae
- Genus: Nanobubon; Magee

Genus of plants

Nanobubon is a genus of flowering plants belonging to the family Apiaceae.

Its native range is South Africa.

== Species ==
Species:

- Nanobubon capillaceum (Thunb.) Magee
- Nanobubon hypogaeum Magee
- Nanobubon strictum (Spreng. ex Schult.) Magee
