= Annesorhiza =

Scientific classification
- Kingdom: Plantae
- Clade: Tracheophytes
- Clade: Angiosperms
- Clade: Eudicots
- Clade: Asterids
- Order: Apiales
- Family: Apiaceae
- Subfamily: Apioideae
- Tribe: Annesorhizeae
- Genus: Annesorhiza; Cham. & Schltdl.

Species
- including: Annesorhiza abyssinica; Annesorhiza altiscapa; Annesorhiza caffra; Annesorhiza capensis; Annesorhiza grandiflora; Annesorhiza macrocarpa; Annesorhiza nuda; Annesorhiza schlechteri; Annesorhiza thunbergia

Genus of flowering plants

Annesorhiza is a genus of flowering plant in the Apiaceae, with about 12 to 15 species. It is endemic to southern Africa. Various species of the genus are noted for their content of aroma compounds and have a traditional culinary usage. Some species are notable for their content of allylbenzene derivatives such as nothoapiole.
