= Diplolophium =

Scientific classification
- Kingdom: Plantae
- Clade: Tracheophytes
- Clade: Angiosperms
- Clade: Eudicots
- Clade: Asterids
- Order: Apiales
- Family: Apiaceae
- Subfamily: Apioideae
- Genus: Diplolophium; Turcz.

Genus of plants

Diplolophium is a genus of flowering plants belonging to the family Apiaceae.

Its native range is Tropical Africa.

Species:

- Diplolophium africanum Turcz.
- Diplolophium boranense Bidgood & Vollesen
- Diplolophium buchananii (Benth. ex Oliv.) C.Norman
- Diplolophium diplolophioides (H.Wolff) Jacq.-Fél.
- Diplolophium somaliense Verdc.
- Diplolophium swynnertonii (Baker f.) C.Norman
- Diplolophium zambesianum Hiern
