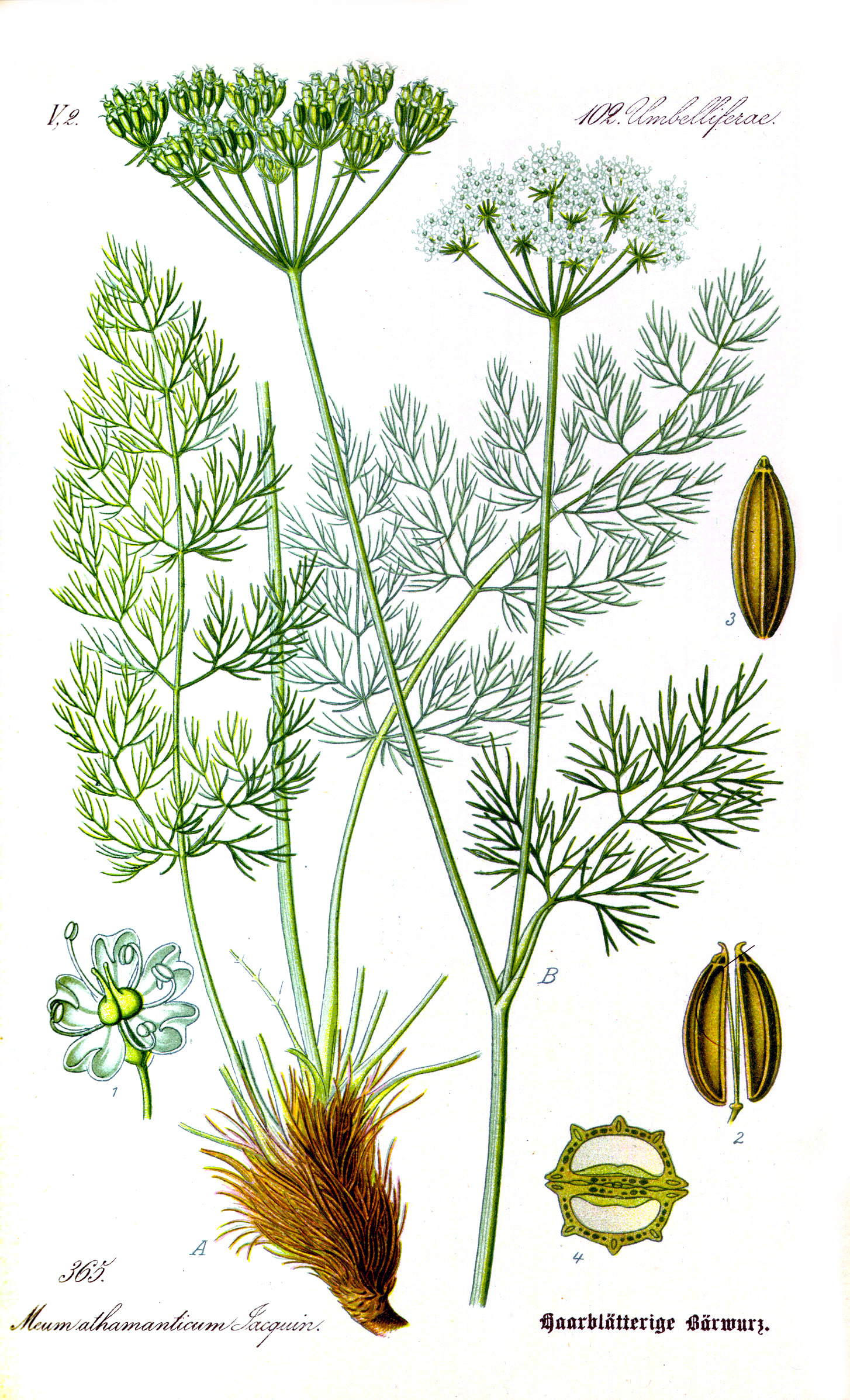

Scientific classification
- Kingdom: Plantae
- Clade: Tracheophytes
- Clade: Angiosperms
- Clade: Eudicots
- Clade: Asterids
- Order: Apiales
- Family: Apiaceae
- Subfamily: Apioideae
- Genus: Meum; Mill.
- Species: M. athamanticum

Binomial name
- Meum athamanticum Jacq.

= Meum =

Species of flowering plant

Meum is a monotypic genus in the family Apiaceae. Its only species is Meum athamanticum, a glabrous, highly aromatic (aroma compound), perennial plant. Common names in the UK include baldmoney, meu or meum, and spignel (also spikenel and spiknel).

It is a plant of grassland, often on limestone, in mountain districts of Western Europe and Central Europe, its range extending as far south as the Sierra Nevada (Spain) of Andalucia, and central Bulgaria in the Balkans. It is not a very common plant in the UK, being found in only a few localities in N. England and N. Wales although a little more plentiful in Scotland – where it is found as far north as Sutherland.

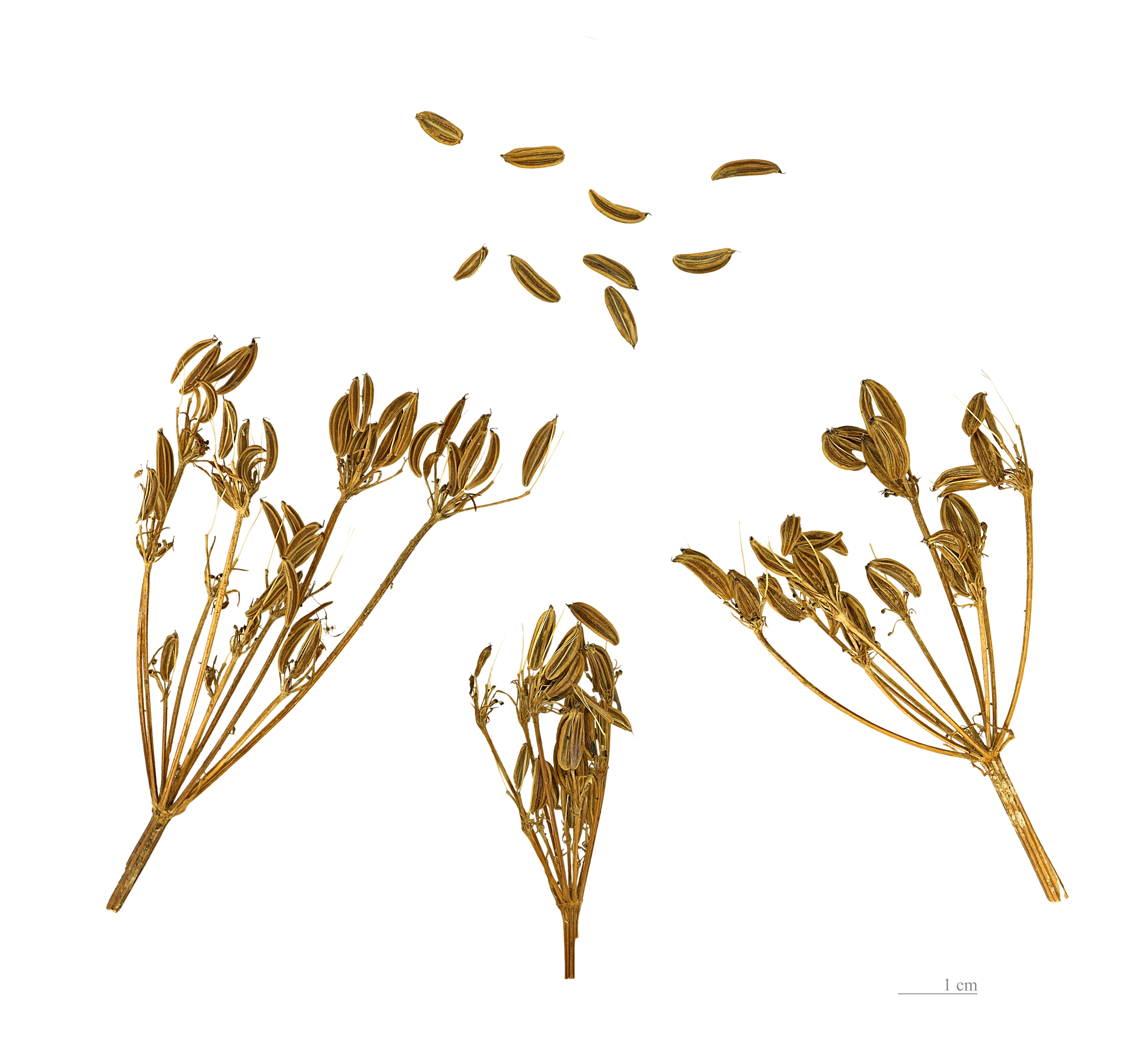
Fruits and seeds

Meum has been cultivated in Scotland, where the roots were eaten as a root vegetable. The delicate, feathery foliage has been used as a condiment and in the preparation of a wide variety of home remedies as a diuretic, to control menstruation and uterine complaints and to treat catarrh, hysteria and stomach ailments. The scent of the roots of Meum has much in common with those of two other edible/medicinal umbellifers: Levisticum officinale and Angelica archangelica, while the aromatic flavour of Meum leaves is somewhat like Melilot (which owes its aroma of new-mown hay to coumarin) and is communicated to milk and butter when cows feed on the foliage in spring. The curious name Baldmoney is said to be derived from the name of the god Baldr (Scandinavian mythology) – to whom the plant was dedicated. In German it is known as Bärwurz [bear wort], feminine gender (die) for the plant and masculine gender (der) for a variety of Bavarian schnapps which is flavoured with its extract.
