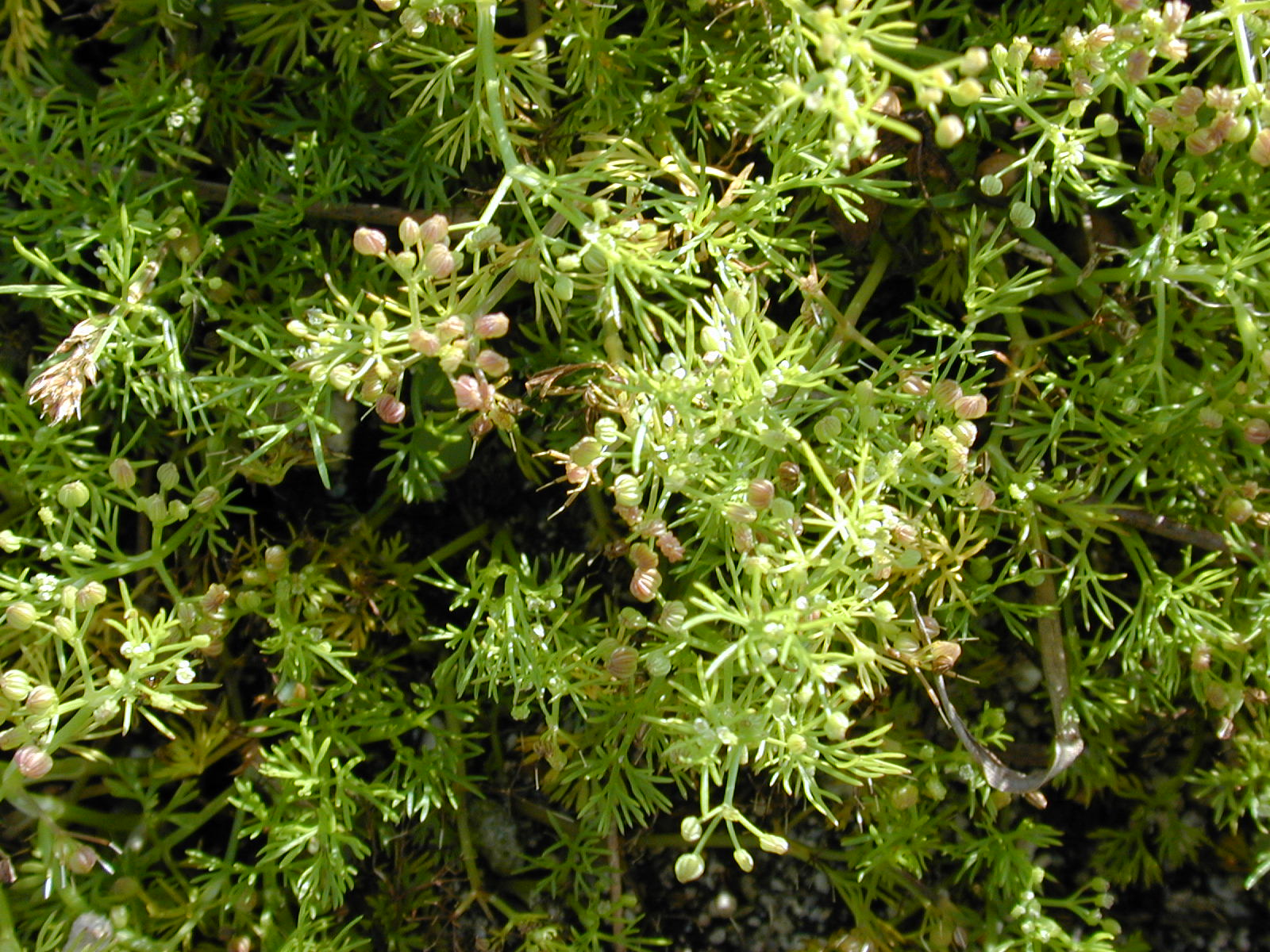
- Cyclospermum leptophyllum

Scientific classification
- Kingdom: Plantae
- Clade: Tracheophytes
- Clade: Angiosperms
- Clade: Eudicots
- Clade: Asterids
- Order: Apiales
- Family: Apiaceae
- Subfamily: Apioideae
- Tribe: Pyramidoptereae
- Genus: Cyclospermum; Lag.

Species
- 3, see text

= Cyclospermum =

Genus of flowering plants

Cyclospermum (also, Ciclospermum) is a small genus of plants in the family Apiaceae. There are three species, including the well-known weed Cyclospermum leptophyllum, the marsh parsley or fir-leafed celery.
