= Scaraboides =

Scientific classification
- Kingdom: Plantae
- Clade: Tracheophytes
- Clade: Angiosperms
- Clade: Eudicots
- Clade: Asterids
- Order: Apiales
- Family: Apiaceae
- Subfamily: Apioideae
- Tribe: Tordylieae
- Genus: Scaraboides; Magee & B.-E.van Wyk
- Species: S. manningii

Binomial name
- Scaraboides manningii Magee & B.-E.van Wyk

Genus of plants

Scaraboides is a monotypic genus of flowering plants belonging to the family Apiaceae. Its only species is Scaraboides manningii. Its native range is the Cape Provinces of South Africa.
