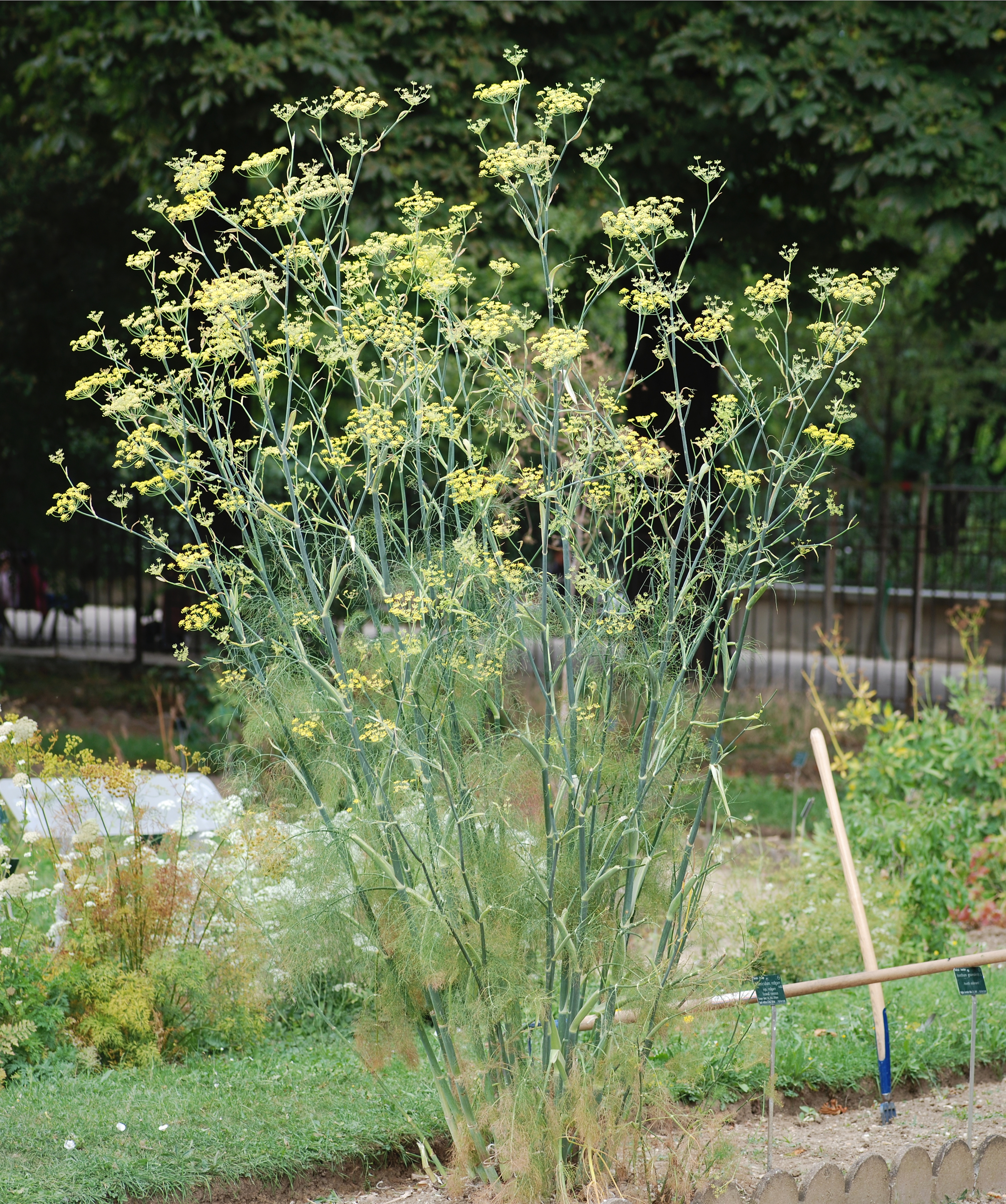
- Foeniculum vulgare in flower

Scientific classification
- Kingdom: Plantae
- Clade: Embryophytes
- Clade: Tracheophytes
- Clade: Spermatophytes
- Clade: Angiosperms
- Clade: Eudicots
- Clade: Asterids
- Order: Apiales
- Family: Apiaceae
- Subfamily: Apioideae
- Tribe: Apieae
- Genus: Foeniculum; Mill.

Type species
- Foeniculum vulgare Mill.

= Foeniculum =

Genus of flowering plants

Foeniculum is a genus of flowering plants in the carrot family. It includes the commonly cultivated fennel, Foeniculum vulgare.

Species:

- Foeniculum vulgare Mill. - Mediterranean, cultivated and naturalized in many regions
- Foeniculum scoparium Quézel - North Africa
- Foeniculum subinodorum Maire, Weiller & Wilczek - North Africa
- Foeniculum piperitum (Ucria) C.Presl - Mediterranean, Macaronesia
- Foeniculum sanguineum Triano & A.Pujadas - Morocco, Spain
