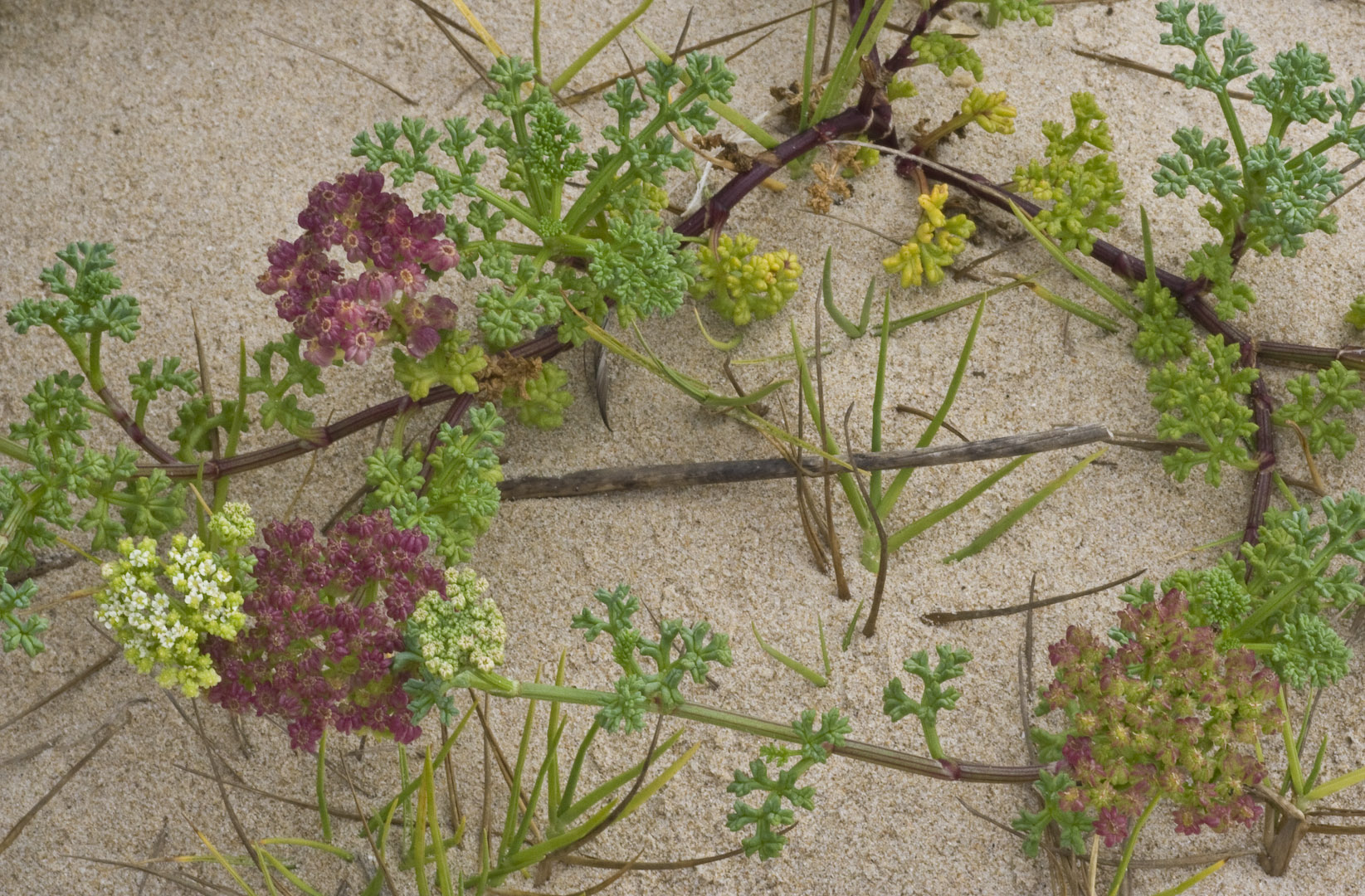
- Dasispermum suffruticosum

Scientific classification
- Kingdom: Plantae
- Clade: Embryophytes
- Clade: Tracheophytes
- Clade: Angiosperms
- Clade: Eudicots
- Clade: Asterids
- Order: Apiales
- Family: Apiaceae
- Subfamily: Apioideae
- Tribe: Tordylieae
- Genus: Dasispermum; Neck. ex Raf.

Species
- See text

Synonyms
- Heteroptilis E.Mey. ex Meisn.; Phymatis E.Mey.; Sonderina H.Wolff

= Dasispermum =

Genus of flowering plants

Dasispermum are a genus of flowering plants in the family Apiaceae, native to coastal area of southern South Africa. Short-lived perennial or annuals, they are low-lying, often sprawling herbs with succulent or semi-succulent leaves, adapted to the dry, salty conditions of the littoral areas where they grow.

== Species ==
Currently accepted species include:

- Dasispermum capense (Lam.) Magee & B.-E.van Wyk
- Dasispermum grandicarpum Magee & B.-E.van Wyk
- Dasispermum hispidum (Thunb.) Magee & B.-E.van Wyk
- Dasispermum humile (Meisn.) Magee & B.-E.van Wyk
- Dasispermum perennans Magee & B.-E.van Wyk
- Dasispermum suffruticosum (P.J.Bergius) B.L.Burtt
- Dasispermum tenue (Sond.) Magee & B.-E.van Wyk
