= Cynorhiza =

Scientific classification
- Kingdom: Plantae
- Clade: Tracheophytes
- Clade: Angiosperms
- Clade: Eudicots
- Clade: Asterids
- Order: Apiales
- Family: Apiaceae
- Subfamily: Apioideae
- Tribe: Tordylieae
- Genus: Cynorhiza; Eckl. & Zeyh.

Genus of flowering plants

Cynorhiza is a genus of flowering plants belonging to the family Apiaceae.

Its native range is Southern Africa.

Species:

- Cynorhiza bolusii Magee & B.-E.van Wyk
- Cynorhiza meifolia (Eckl. & Zeyh.) Magee
- Cynorhiza typica Eckl. & Zeyh.
