= Polemanniopsis =

Scientific classification
- Kingdom: Plantae
- Clade: Tracheophytes
- Clade: Angiosperms
- Clade: Eudicots
- Clade: Asterids
- Order: Apiales
- Family: Apiaceae
- Subfamily: Apioideae
- Tribe: Steganotaenieae
- Genus: Polemanniopsis; B.L.Burtt

Genus of flowering plant

Polemanniopsis is a genus of flowering plants belonging to the family Apiaceae.

It is native to the Cape Provinces and Namibia in South Africa.

The genus name of Polemanniopsis is in honour of Peter Heinrich Polemann (1779 – 1839), a German chemist and apothecary who supported plant collectors in Schleswig-Holstein, who went to Cape Town, South Africa. It was first described and published in Notes Roy. Bot. Gard. Edinburgh Vol.45 on page 498 (written in 1988, published in 1989.

== Known species ==
According to Kew:

- Polemanniopsis marlothii (H.Wolff) B.L.Burtt
- Polemanniopsis namibensis B.-E.van Wyk, A.Burke & Mannh.
