= Polemannia =

Scientific classification
- Kingdom: Plantae
- Clade: Tracheophytes
- Clade: Angiosperms
- Clade: Eudicots
- Clade: Asterids
- Order: Apiales
- Family: Apiaceae
- Subfamily: Apioideae
- Tribe: Heteromorpheae
- Genus: Polemannia; Eckl. & Zeyh.

Genus of flowering plant

Polemannia is a genus of flowering plants belonging to the family Apiaceae.

It is native to South Africa (the Cape Provinces, the Free State and KwaZulu-Natal) and Lesotho.

The genus name of Polemannia is in honour of Peter Heinrich Polemann (1779 – 1839), a German chemist and apothecary who supported plant collectors in Schleswig-Holstein, who went to Cape Town, South Africa. It was first described and published in Enum. Pl. Afric. Austral. on page 347 in 1837.

== Known species ==
According to Kew:

- Polemannia grossulariifolia Eckl. & Zeyh.
- Polemannia montana Schltr. & H.Wolff
- Polemannia simplicior Hilliard & B.L.Burtt
