= Itasina =

Scientific classification
- Kingdom: Plantae
- Clade: Tracheophytes
- Clade: Angiosperms
- Clade: Eudicots
- Clade: Asterids
- Order: Apiales
- Family: Apiaceae
- Subfamily: Apioideae
- Tribe: Annesorhizeae
- Genus: Itasina; Raf.
- Species: I. filifolia

Binomial name
- Itasina filifolia (Thunb.) Raf.

Genus of plants

Itasina is a genus of flowering plants belonging to the family Apiaceae. It contains a single species, Itasina filifolia.

Its native range is South African Republic.
