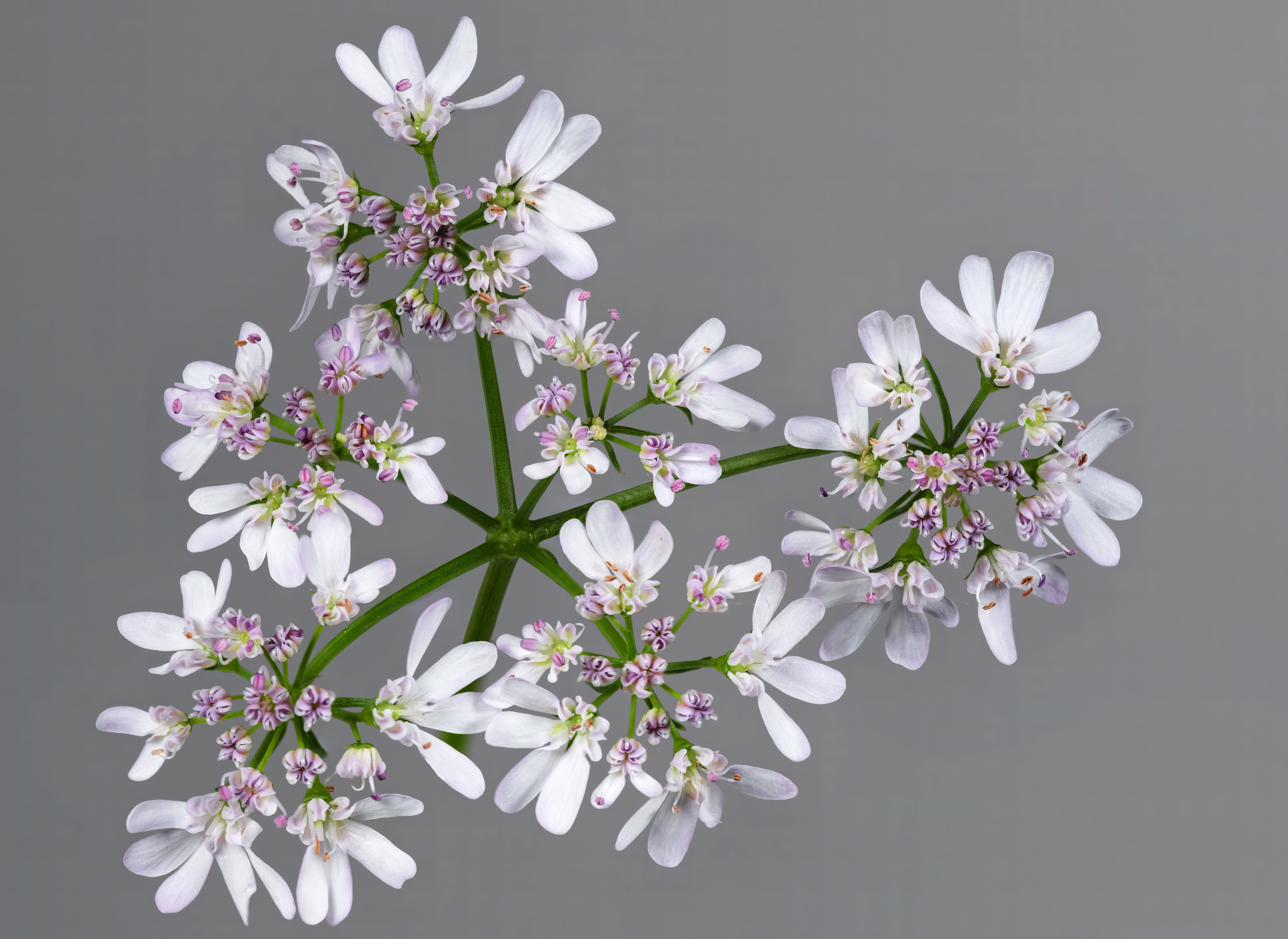
- Coriandrum sativum blossoms

Scientific classification
- Kingdom: Plantae
- Clade: Embryophytes
- Clade: Tracheophytes
- Clade: Angiosperms
- Clade: Eudicots
- Clade: Asterids
- Order: Apiales
- Family: Apiaceae
- Subfamily: Apioideae
- Tribe: Coriandreae
- Genus: Coriandrum; L.

Species
- Coriandrum sativum L.; Coriandrum tordylium (Fenzl) Bornm.

= Coriandrum =

Genus of flowering plants

Coriandrum is a genus of herbs in the family Apiaceae containing the cultivated species Coriandrum sativum (coriander) and the wild species Coriandrum tordylium. The leaves and seeds of Coriandrum sativum are used in cooking. The leaves are often referred to as cilantro in North America. It is the namesake of the Tribe Coriandreae.
