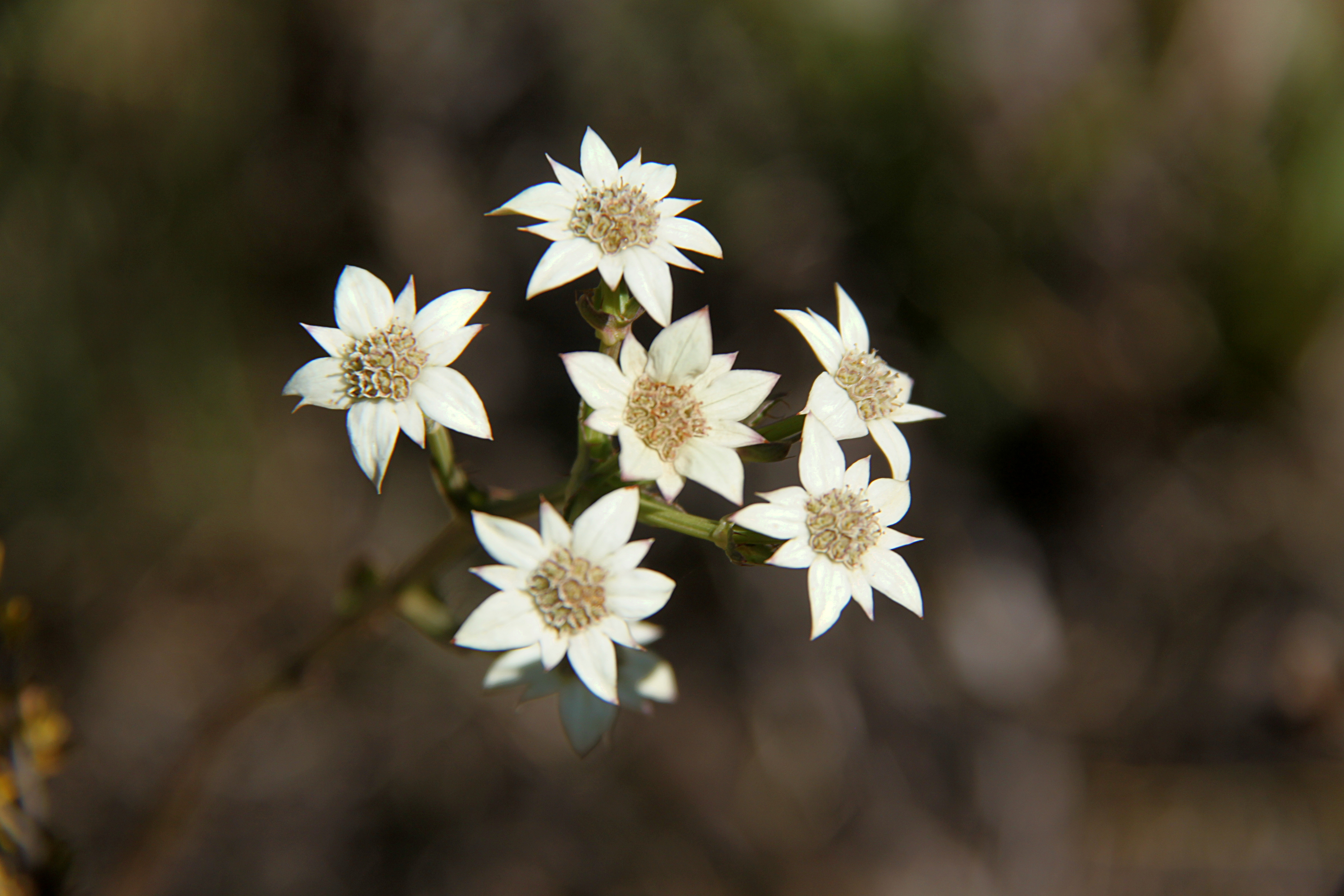
- Flowerheads from above of Alepidea masaica, photographed along the Chogoria route, Mount Kenya, at approximately 3000 m altitude

Scientific classification
- Kingdom: Plantae
- Clade: Tracheophytes
- Clade: Angiosperms
- Clade: Eudicots
- Clade: Asterids
- Order: Apiales
- Family: Apiaceae
- Subfamily: Apioideae
- Tribe: Saniculeae
- Genus: Alepidea; F.Delaroche

Species
- See text.

= Alepidea =

Genus of flowering plants

Alepidea is a genus of about 30 species in the family Apiaceae, all of which are endemic to Africa. They occur mainly in southern Africa, but can be found as far north as Ethiopia.

== Species ==
As of December 2022, Plants of the World Online accepted the following species:

- Alepidea acutidens Weim.
- Alepidea amatymbica Eckl. & Zeyh.
- Alepidea angustifolia Schltr. & H.Wolff
- Alepidea attenuata Weim.
- Alepidea calocephala Schltr. & H.Wolff
- Alepidea capensis (P.J.Bergius) R.A.Dyer
- Alepidea cirsiifolia Schltr. & H.Wolff
- Alepidea comosa Dümmer
- Alepidea concinna Dümmer
- Alepidea cordifolia B.-E.van Wyk
- Alepidea delicatula Weim.
- Alepidea duplidens Weim.
- Alepidea galpinii Dümmer
- Alepidea inflexa S.-L.Hutch. & Magee
- Alepidea insculpta Hilliard & B.L.Burtt
- Alepidea jenkinsii R.Pott
- Alepidea longeciliata Schinz ex Dümmer
- Alepidea longipetiolata Schltr. & H.Wolff
- Alepidea macowanii Dümmer
- Alepidea multisecta B.L.Burtt
- Alepidea natalensis J.M.Wood & M.S.Evans
- Alepidea peduncularis Steud. ex A.Rich.
- Alepidea pilifera Weim.
- Alepidea pusilla Weim.
- Alepidea schlechteri H.Wolff
- Alepidea serrata Eckl. & Zeyh.
- Alepidea setifera N.E.Br.
- Alepidea stellata Weim.
- Alepidea thodei Dümmer
- Alepidea woodii Oliv.
- Alepidea wyliei Dümmer
