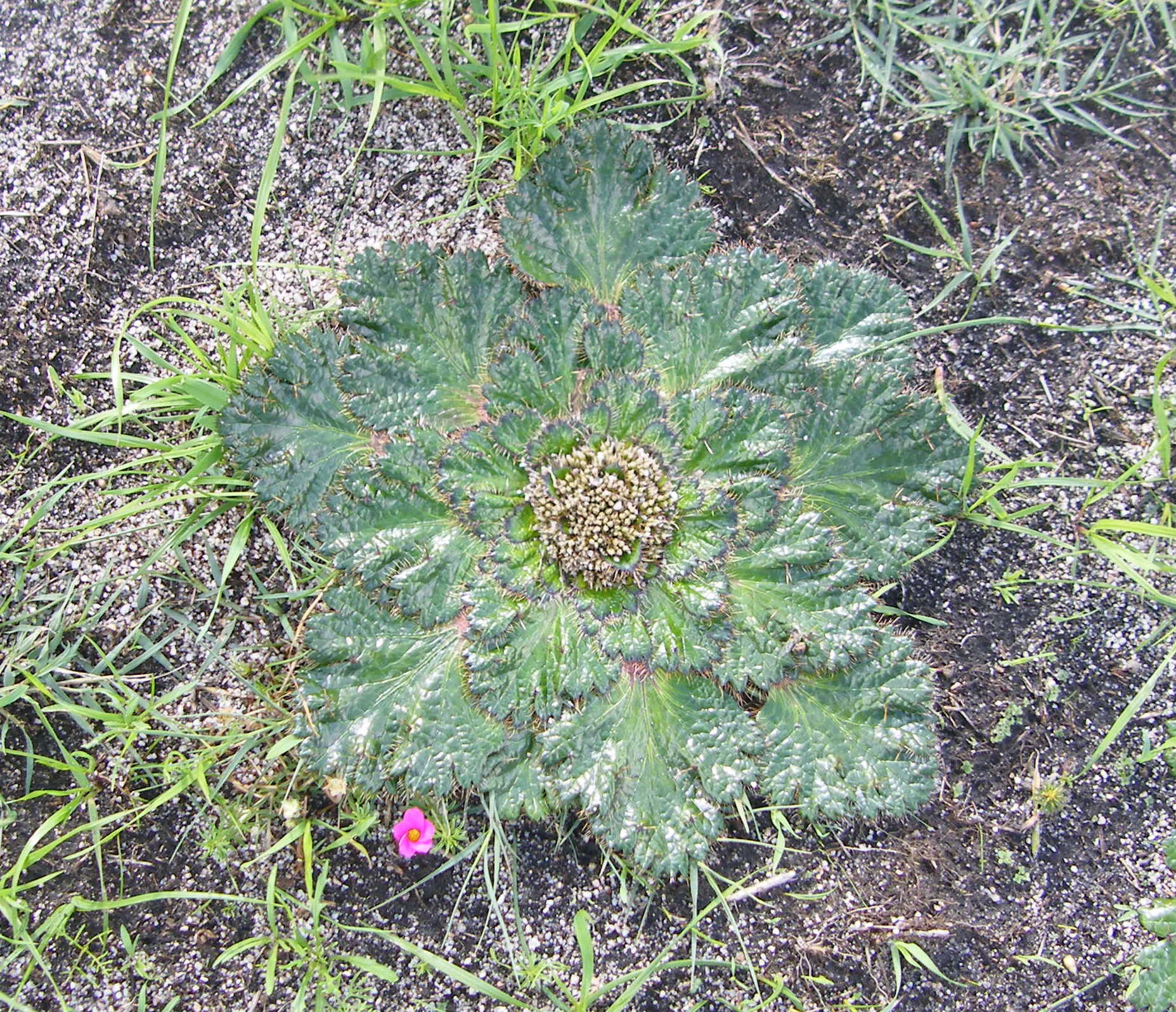
- Arctopus echinatus, female plant in flower

Scientific classification
- Kingdom: Plantae
- Clade: Tracheophytes
- Clade: Angiosperms
- Clade: Eudicots
- Clade: Asterids
- Order: Apiales
- Family: Apiaceae
- Subfamily: Apioideae
- Tribe: Saniculeae
- Genus: Arctopus; L.

Species
- Arctopus dregei Sond.; Arctopus echinatus L.; Arctopus monacanthus Carmich. ex Sond.

= Arctopus =

Genus of flowering plants

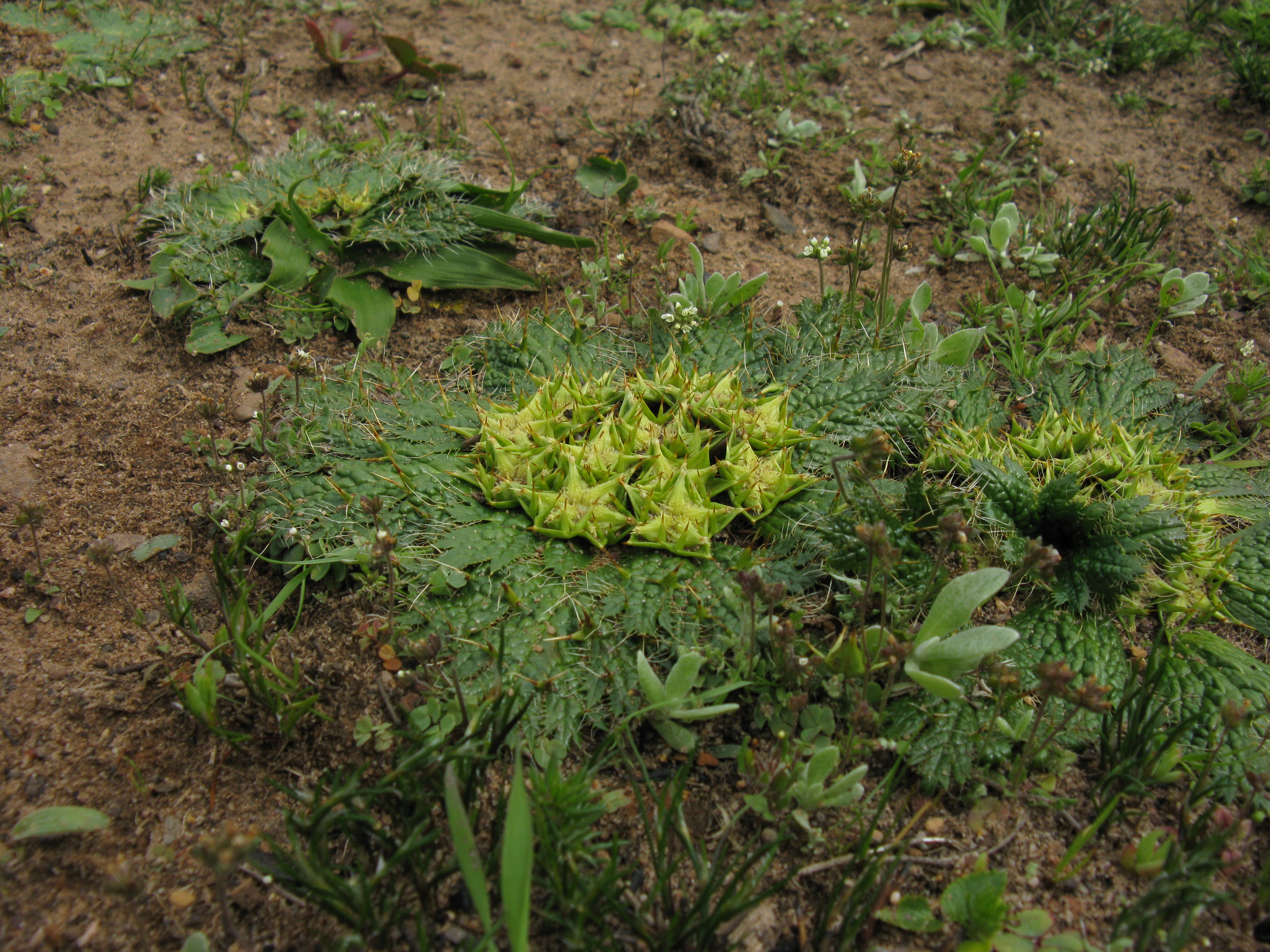
Arctopus echinatus, male plant in flower.

Arctopus is a genus of flowering plants in the Apiaceae, with three species. The genus is endemic to Southern Africa. The genus name means "bears foot" (from ἄρκτος árktos "bear" and πούς pous "foot") in reference to the curious growth habit, resembling a large footprint, if not to the fact that the leaves are fringed with formidable prickles that punish bare feet and grazing.

The species were used in Khoisan medicine and adopted by the early settlers who gave them the Afrikaans name of sieketroos (= "sickness-comfort" i.e. "sickness remedy")

The species are atypical of the Apiaceae in that the leaves grow flat on the ground, and that the plants are dioecious, with the male and female flowers borne on separate plants.

== Gallery ==
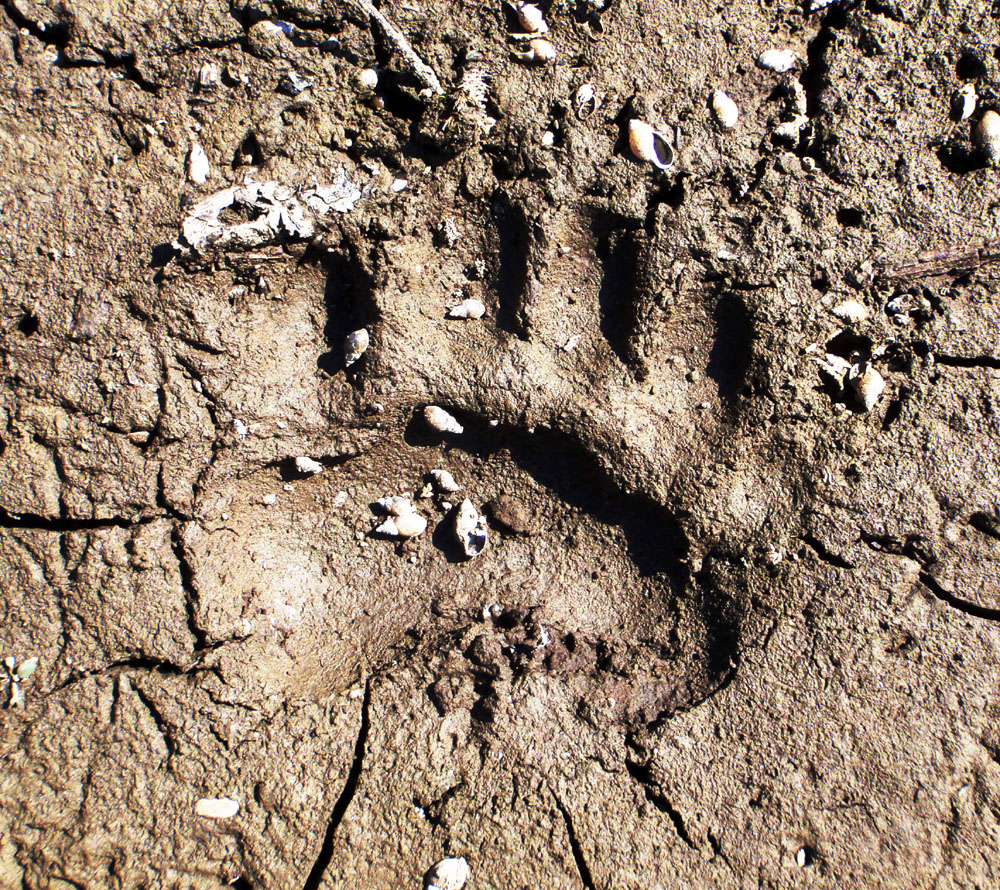
Paw print of a bear, showing similarity to curious outline of Arctopus foliage - whence genus name
