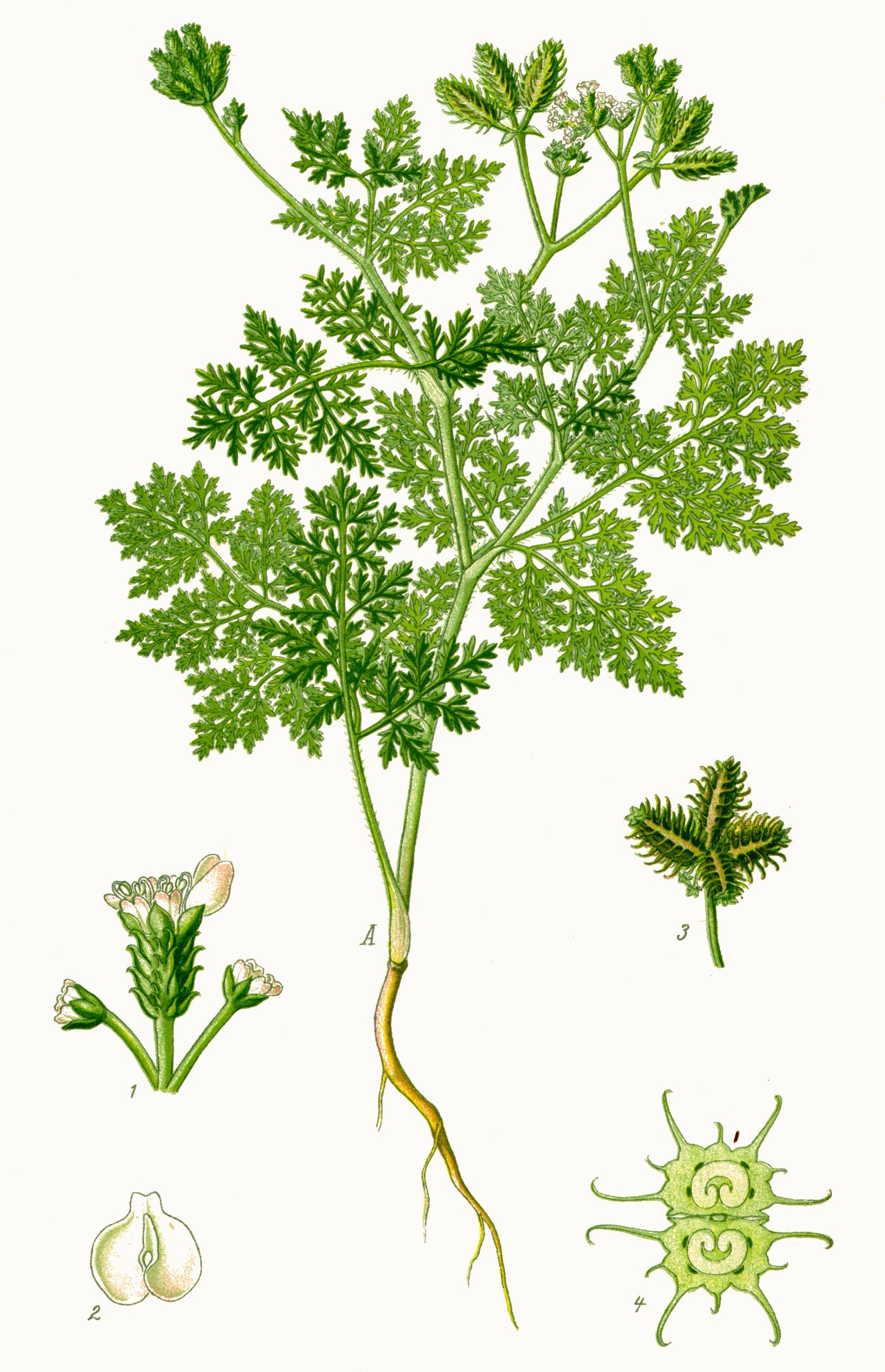
- Botanical illustration

Scientific classification
- Kingdom: Plantae
- Clade: Tracheophytes
- Clade: Angiosperms
- Clade: Eudicots
- Clade: Asterids
- Order: Apiales
- Family: Apiaceae
- Subfamily: Apioideae
- Tribe: Scandiceae
- Subtribe: Torilidinae
- Genus: Caucalis; L.
- Species: C. platycarpos

Binomial name
- Caucalis platycarpos L.

Synonyms
- List: Ageomoron royenii (L.) Raf.; Caucalis lappula Grande; Caucalis latifolia Lam. 1779 not (L.) L. 1768; Caucalis linearifolia Req. ex DC.; Caucalis queraltii Sennen; Caucalis royenii (L.) Crantz; Caucalis tenuifolia Salisb.; Conium royenii L.; Daucus caucalis E.H.L.Krause; Daucus lappula Weber; Daucus platycarpos Scop.; Daucus royenii (L.) Baill.; Orlaya platycarpos (L.) W.D.J.Koch

= Caucalis =

Genus of plants

Caucalis platycarpos is a species of flowering plant in the family Apiaceae, the only member of the genus Caucalis. Common names are carrot bur parsley, small bur-parsley, and burr parsley. It is native to Europe, North Africa, and the Middle East as far east as Iran.

== Description ==
Caucalis platycarpos is an annual up to 40 centimetres (16 in) tall with trailing stems. Leaves are highly divided into many small leaflets. Flowers are produced in an umbel of 2 to 5 flowers, each with white or pink petals. The fruit is an oblong capsule with many hooked spines on the surface.

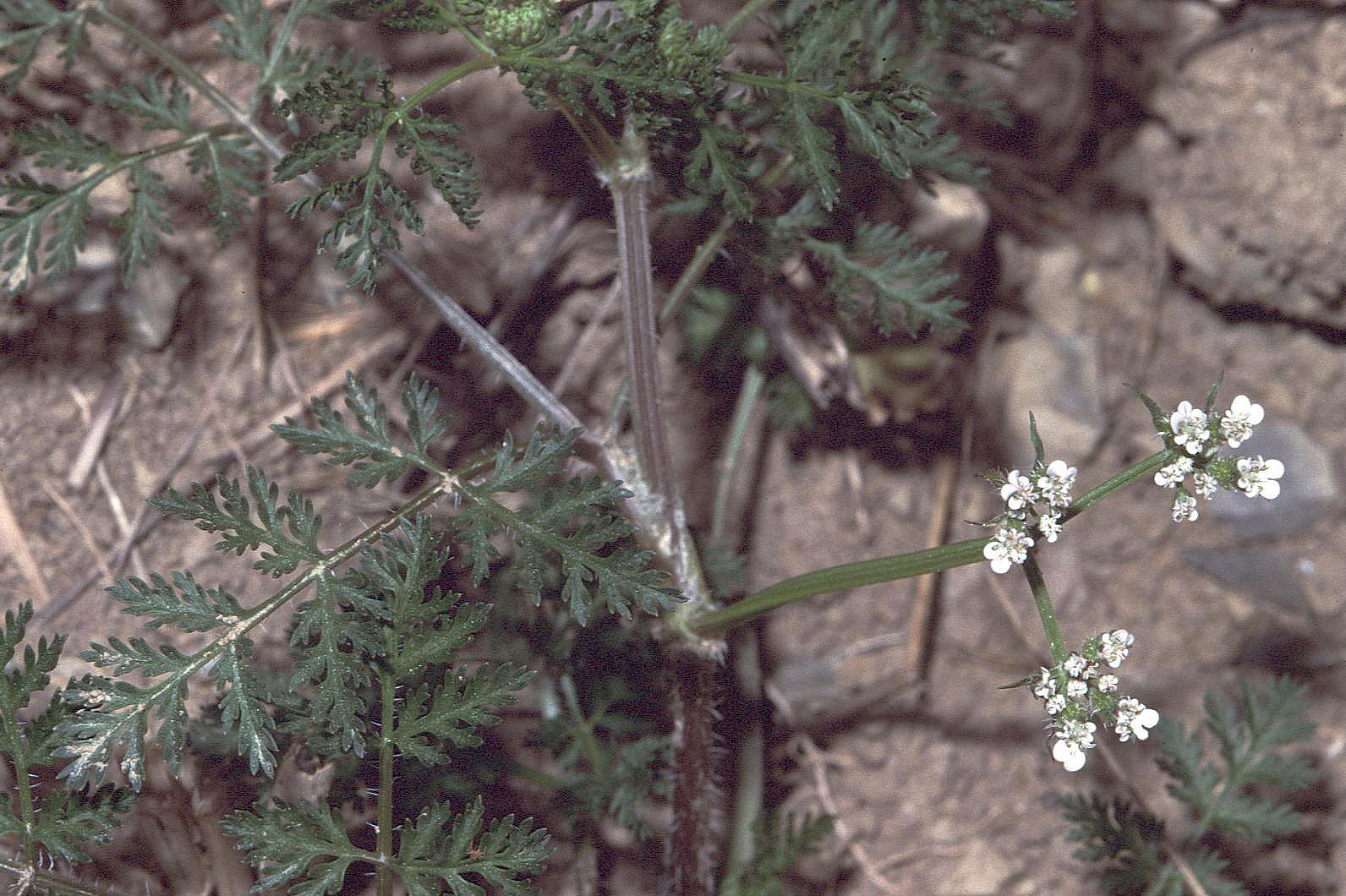
Foliage

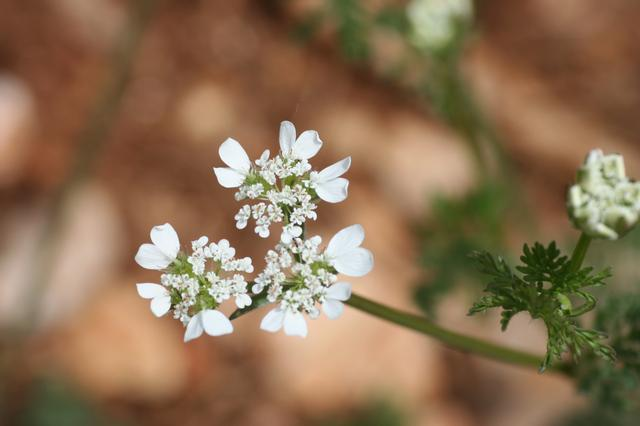
Flowers close-up

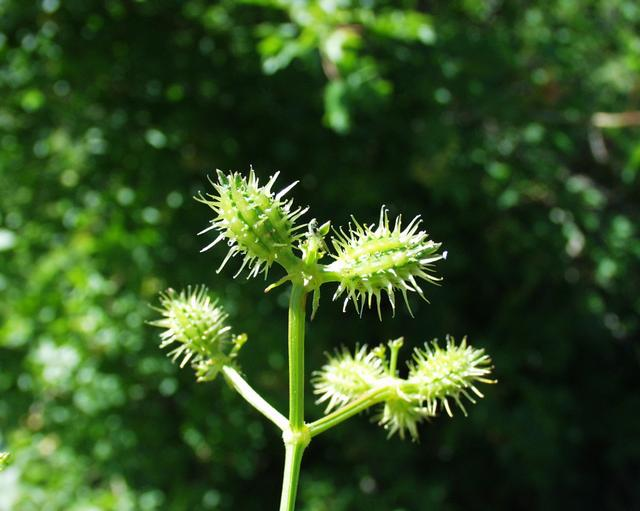
Fruit close-up

== Distribution and habitat ==
It is distributed in southwest Asia, North Africa and most of central and Southern Europe; almost all of the Iberian Peninsula.

It is found in crop fields, fallows and nitrophilous grasslands. Preferably in basic substrates at an altitude of 100-1000 (1600) meters. Flowering occurs in March-June (July) and fruiting in May-August.
