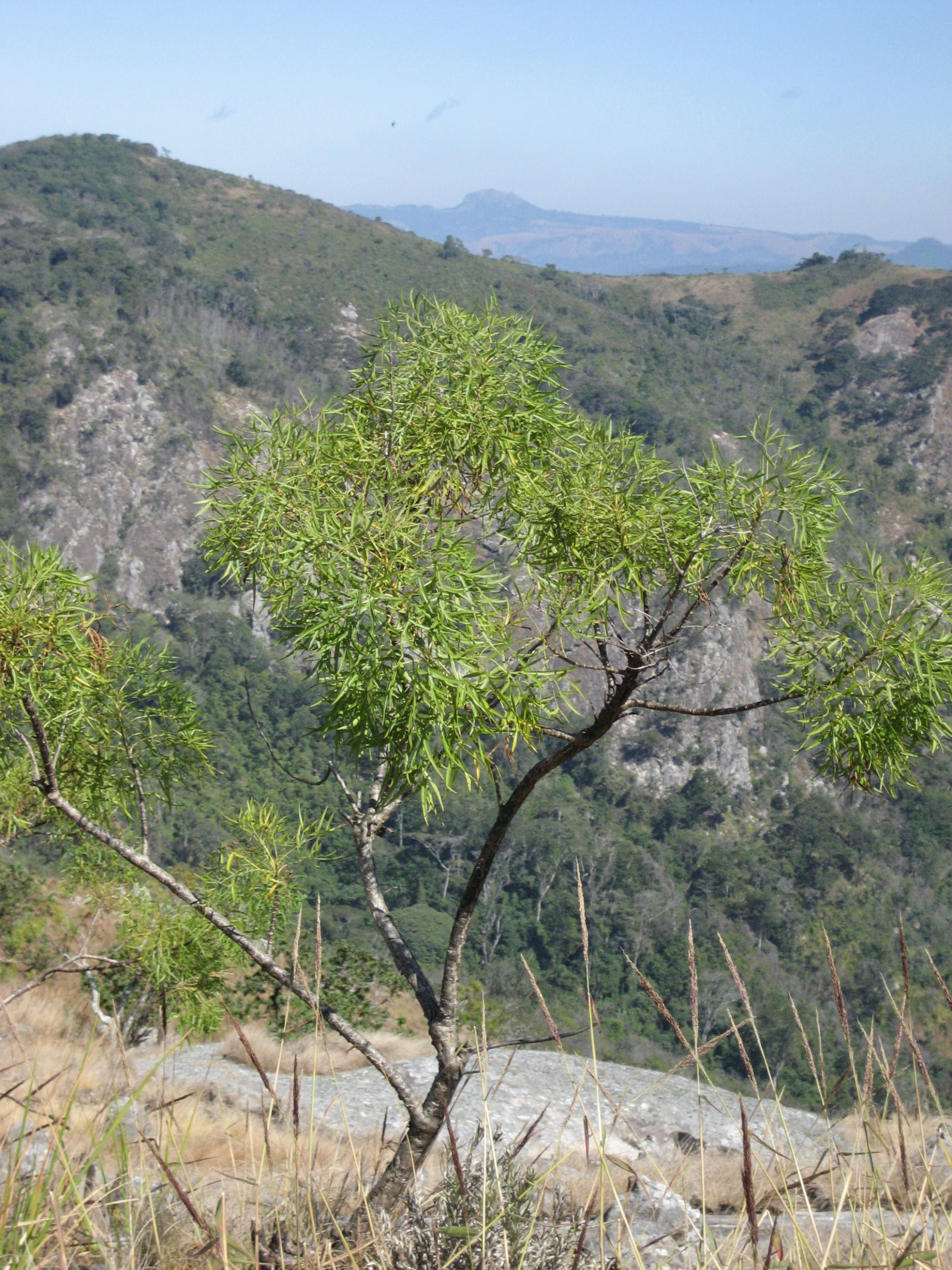
- Heteromorpha arborescens

Scientific classification
- Kingdom: Plantae
- Clade: Tracheophytes
- Clade: Angiosperms
- Clade: Eudicots
- Clade: Asterids
- Order: Apiales
- Family: Apiaceae
- Tribe: Heteromorpheae
- Genus: Heteromorpha; Cham. & Schltdl., nom. cons.

Synonyms
- Aframmi C.Norman; Franchetella Kuntze

= Heteromorpha (plant) =

Genus of flowering plants

Heteromorpha is a genus of plants within the family Apiaceae. Its species are native to southern and tropical Africa and the southwestern Arabian Peninsula.

== Species ==
As of December 2022, Plants of the World Online accepted the following species:

- Heteromorpha arborescens (Spreng.) Cham. & Schltdl.
- Heteromorpha gossweileri (C.Norman) C.Norman
- Heteromorpha involucrata Conrath
- Heteromorpha montana (P.J.D.Winter) J.E.Burrows
- Heteromorpha occidentalis P.J.D.Winter
- Heteromorpha papillosa C.C.Towns.
- Heteromorpha pubescens Burtt Davy
- Heteromorpha stenophylla Welw. ex Schinz
