= Moon carrot =

Moon carrot is the common name for two members of the genus Seseli:

- S. gummiferum the "sticky moon carrot" native to Eastern Europe, the Aegean and Crimea.
- S. libanotis native to northern and central Eurasia, and parts of North Africa.
