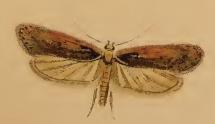

Scientific classification
- Domain: Eukaryota
- Kingdom: Animalia
- Phylum: Arthropoda
- Class: Insecta
- Order: Lepidoptera
- Family: Depressariidae
- Genus: Depressaria
- Species: D. libanotidella

Binomial name
- Depressaria libanotidella Schlager, 1849

Synonyms
- Depressaria libanotidella var. laserpitii Nickerl, 1864; Schistodepressaria bantiella Rocci, 1934; Schistodepressaria nigrella Rocci, 1934

= Depressaria libanotidella =

Species of moth

Depressaria libanotidella is a moth of the family Depressariidae. It is found in most of Europe, except Great Britain, Ireland, the Benelux, Portugal, Norway, Poland, most of the Balkan Peninsula and most of the Baltic region.

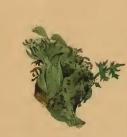
Apical leaves of Seseli libanotis drawn together by larva

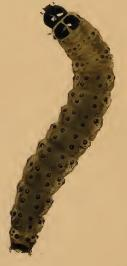
Larva

The wingspan is 22–29 mm. Adults are on wing in June.

The larvae feed on Seseli libanotis and Laserpitium prutenicum.
