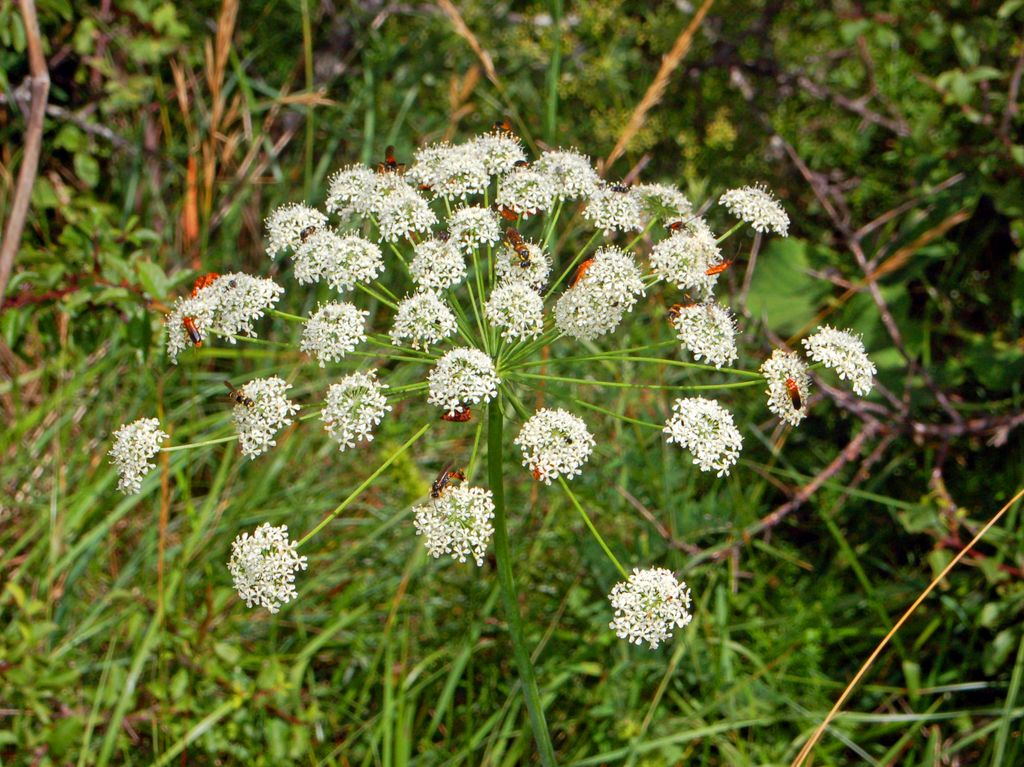
- Laserpitium latifolium

Scientific classification
- Kingdom: Plantae
- Clade: Tracheophytes
- Clade: Angiosperms
- Clade: Eudicots
- Clade: Asterids
- Order: Apiales
- Family: Apiaceae
- Subfamily: Apioideae
- Tribe: Scandiceae
- Subtribe: Daucinae
- Genus: Laserpitium; L.

Synonyms
- Alsaton Raf.; Aspitium Neck. ex Steud.; Bradlaeia Neck.; Lacellia Bubani

= Laserpitium =

Genus of flowering plants

Laserpitium is a genus of flowering plants in the family Apiaceae. It includes eight species native to Europe and Morocco.

== Species ==
Eight species are accepted.

- Laserpitium emilianum Emb.
- Laserpitium gallicum L.
- Laserpitium halleri Crantz
- Laserpitium krapfii Crantz
- Laserpitium latifolium L. – broad-leaved sermountain
- Laserpitium longiradium Boiss.
- Laserpitium nitidum Zanted.
- Laserpitium peucedanoides L.

=== Formerly placed here ===
- Laserocarpum pseudomeum (Orph., Heldr. & Sartori ex Boiss.) Spalik, Wojew., Constantin. & S.R.Downie (as Laserpitium pseudomeum Orph., Heldr. & Sartori ex Boiss.)
- Siler montanum Crantz (as Laserpitium siler L.)
- Silphiodaucus prutenicus (L.) Spalik, Wojew., Banasiak, Piwczyński & Reduron (as Laserpitium prutenicum L.)
- Thapsia nestleri (Soy.-Will.) Wojew., Banasiak, Reduron & Spalik (as Laserpitium nestleri Soy.-Will.)
