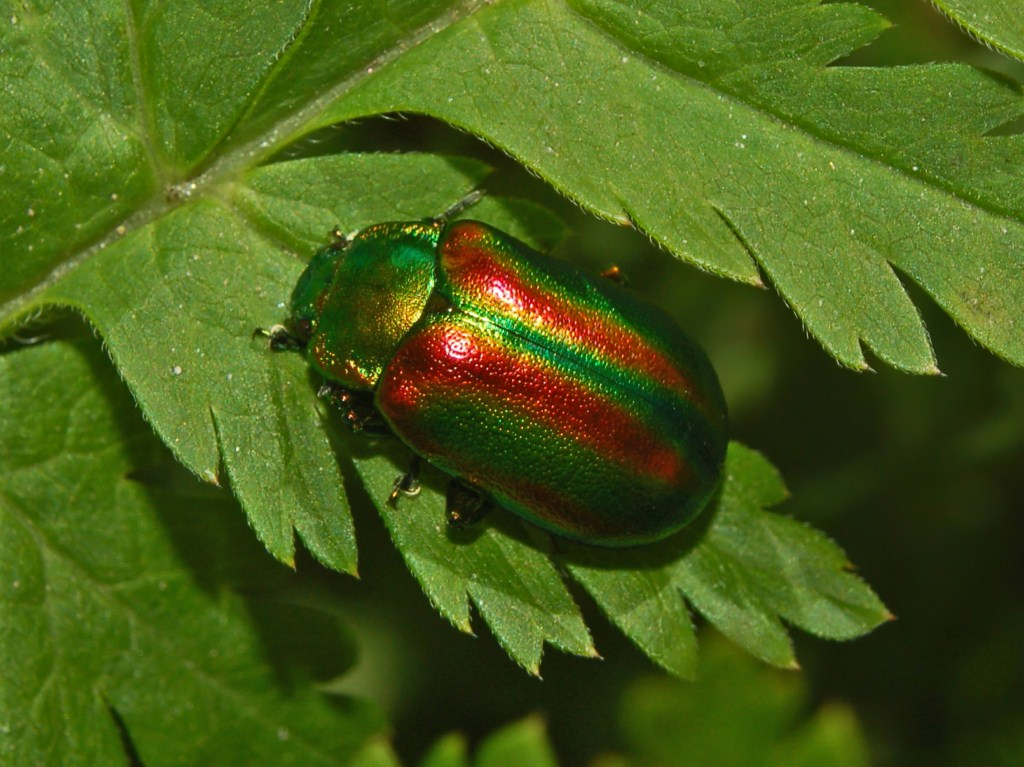
- Oreina speciosa excellens – male

Scientific classification
- Kingdom: Animalia
- Phylum: Arthropoda
- Class: Insecta
- Order: Coleoptera
- Suborder: Polyphaga
- Infraorder: Cucujiformia
- Family: Chrysomelidae
- Genus: Oreina
- Species: O. speciosa

Binomial name
- Oreina speciosa (Linnaeus, 1767)

Synonyms
- Chrysochloa vittigera Suffrian, 1851; Chrysomela speciosa Linnaeus, 1767; Chrysochloa gloriosa (Fabricius, 1781)

= Oreina speciosa =

Species of beetle

Oreina speciosa is a species of broad-shouldered leaf beetles of the family Chrysomelidae, subfamily Chrysomelinae.

This alpine leaf beetle lives in the Pyrenees, Massif Central, Jura, Vosges, Alps, Apennines and Balkans.

The adults are 9–13 millimetres (0.35–0.51 in) long. The colours of the elytra of this beetle are very variable, with varieties completely blue, purple, black or else bright metallic green crossed by longitudinal blue or red (or both) stripes.

It can be found on various Apiaceae species, mainly of the genus Laserpitium, Heracleum, Chaerophyllum, Peucedanum and Angelica. The activity period is June–August.

== Subspecies ==
- O. speciosa bosniaca Apfelbeck, 1912
- O. speciosa excellens Weise, 1907
- O. speciosa ganglbaueri Jakob, 1953
- O. speciosa huberi Bechyné, 1958
- O. speciosa lugdunensis Weise, 1907
- O. speciosa pretiosa Suffrian, 1851
- O. speciosa pseudoliturata G. Müller, 1916
- O. speciosa speciosa (Linnaeus, 1767)
