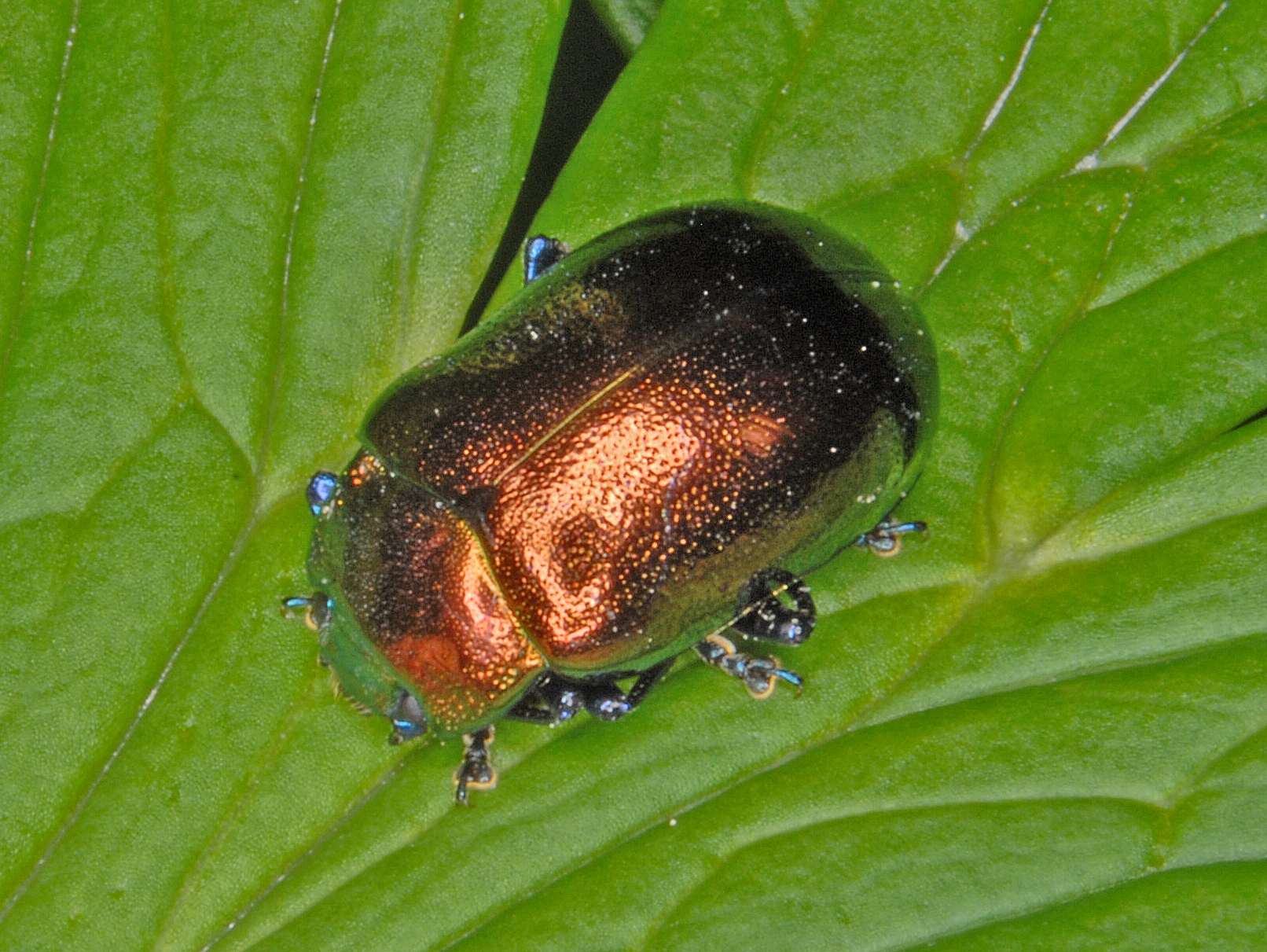
- Oreina bifrons decora ab. aerosa. Female

Scientific classification
- Kingdom: Animalia
- Phylum: Arthropoda
- Class: Insecta
- Order: Coleoptera
- Suborder: Polyphaga
- Infraorder: Cucujiformia
- Family: Chrysomelidae
- Genus: Oreina
- Species: O. bifrons

Binomial name
- Oreina bifrons (Fabricius, 1792)

Synonyms
- Chrysomela bifrons Fabricius, 1792

= Oreina bifrons =

Species of beetle

Oreina bifrons is a species of broad-shouldered leaf beetles belonging to the family Chrysomelidae, subfamily Chrysomelinae.

== Subspecies ==
Subspecies include:

- Oreina bifrons bifrons (Fabricius, 1792)
- Oreina bifrons cadorensis Bechyné, 1958
- Oreina bifrons decora (Richter, 1820)
- Oreina bifrons gadmena Bechyné, 1958
- Oreina bifrons heterocera (Reitter, 1917)
- Oreina bifrons monticola (Duftschmid, 1825)

== Description ==
Oreina bifrons can reach a length of 9–10 millimetres (0.35–0.39 in). These beetles are characterised by colour polymorphism.

== Distribution ==
This species can be found in Europe, in the Alps, Sudetes, Carpathians and Balkans.

== Biology ==
These beetles are viviparous. Larvae mainly feed on Chaerophyllum hirsutum.
