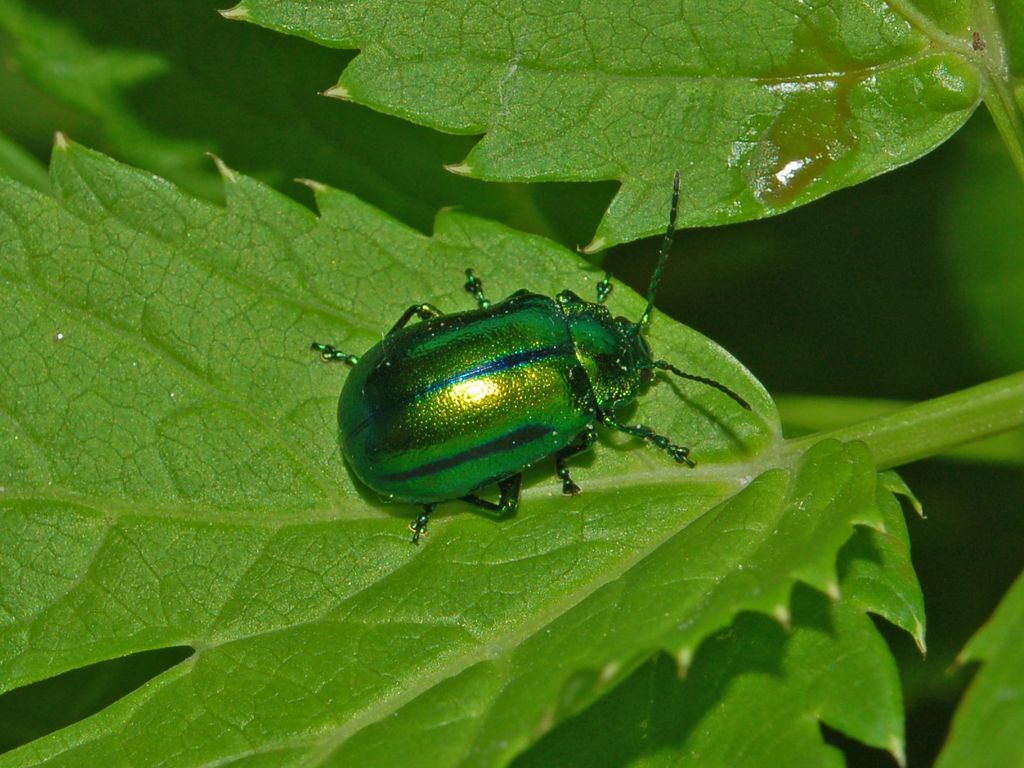
- Oreina gloriosa

Scientific classification
- Kingdom: Animalia
- Phylum: Arthropoda
- Clade: Pancrustacea
- Class: Insecta
- Order: Coleoptera
- Suborder: Polyphaga
- Infraorder: Cucujiformia
- Family: Chrysomelidae
- Subfamily: Chrysomelinae
- Tribe: Chrysomelini
- Genus: Oreina; Chevrolat in Dejean, 1836

Synonyms
- Orina Agassiz, 1846

= Oreina =

Genus of beetles

Oreina is a genus of broad-shouldered leaf beetles belonging to the family Chrysomelidae, subfamily Chrysomelinae.

== Species ==
The genus contains the following species, in seven subgenera:

- Subgenus Allorina Weise, 1902
  - Oreina auricollis Stierlin, 1887
  - Oreina caerulea (Olivier, 1790)
  - Oreina canavesei Bontems, 1984
  - Oreina collucens (Daniel, 1903)
- Subgenus Chrysochloa Hope, 1840
  - Oreina cacaliae (Schrank, 1785)
  - Oreina elongata (Suffrian, 1851)
  - Oreina fairmairiana (Gozis, 1882)
  - Oreina genei (Suffrian, 1851)
  - Oreina redikortzevi (Jakobson, 1924)
  - Oreina speciosissima (Scopoli, 1763)
- Subgenus Frigidorina Kühnelt, 1985
  - Oreina frigida Weise, 1883
- Subgenus Intricatorina Kühnelt, 1985
  - Oreina intricata (Germar, 1824)
- Subgenus Oreina Chevrolat in Dejean, 1836 (sensu stricto)
  - Oreina alpestris (Schummel, 1844)
  - Oreina bifrons (Fabricius, 1792)
  - Oreina ganglbaueri (Jakob, 1953)
  - Oreina gloriosa (Fabricius, 1781)
  - Oreina liturata (Scopoli, 1763)
  - Oreina speciosa (Linnaeus, 1767)
  - Oreina sulcata (Gebler, 1823)
  - Oreina viridis (Duftschmid, 1825)
- Subgenus Protorina Weise, 1894
  - Oreina ludovicae (Mulsant, 1854)
  - Oreina melancholica (Heer, 1845)
  - Oreina peirolerii (Bassi, 1834)
  - Oreina plagiata (Suffrian, 1861)
  - Oreina retenta Weise, 1894
  - Oreina schipkana (Jakob, 1953)
  - Oreina sibylla (Binaghi, 1938)
- Subgenus Virgulatorina Kühnelt, 1985
  - Oreina virgulata (Germar, 1824)
