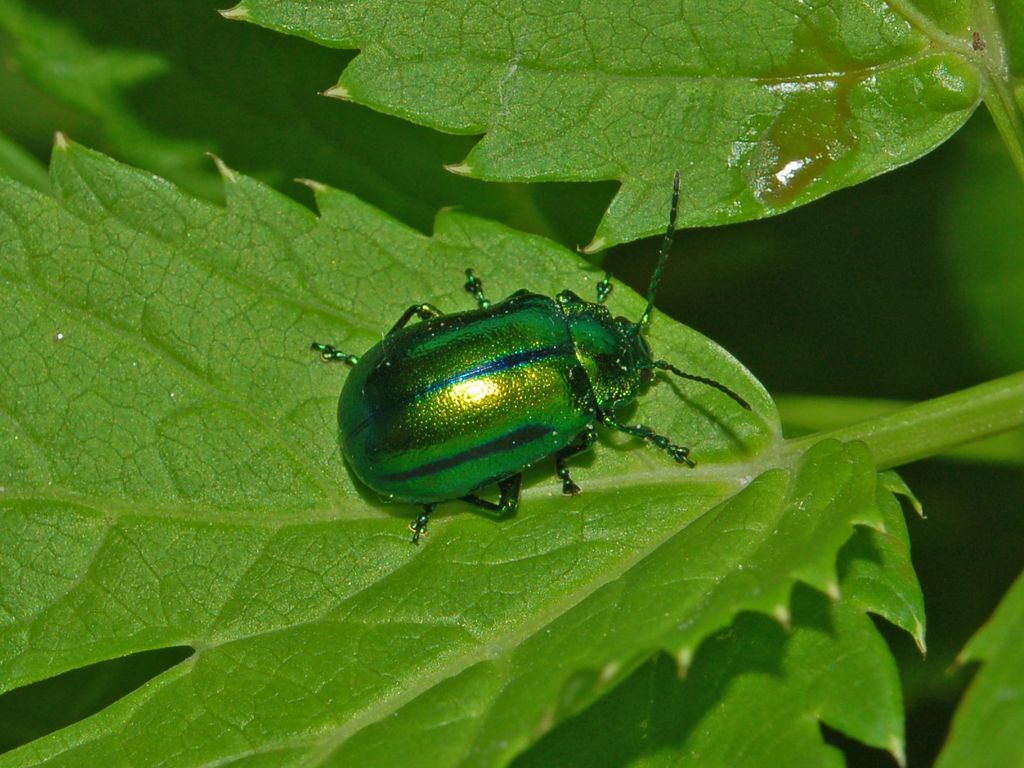

Scientific classification
- Kingdom: Animalia
- Phylum: Arthropoda
- Class: Insecta
- Order: Coleoptera
- Suborder: Polyphaga
- Infraorder: Cucujiformia
- Family: Chrysomelidae
- Genus: Oreina
- Species: O. gloriosa

Binomial name
- Oreina gloriosa (Fabricius, 1781)

Synonyms
- Oreina vittigera (Suffrian, 1851)

= Oreina gloriosa =

Species of beetle

Oreina gloriosa is a species of broad-shouldered leaf beetles of the family Chrysomelidae, subfamily Chrysomelinae.

This alpine leaf beetle is found in France, Italy, Germany, Switzerland and Austria.

The only food plant for both adults and larvae is the Masterwort (Peucedanum ostruthium in the family Apiaceae). The adults are 8–10 millimetres (0.31–0.39 in) long. Elytra are bright metallic green crossed by longitudinal blue stripes, or metallic blue.
