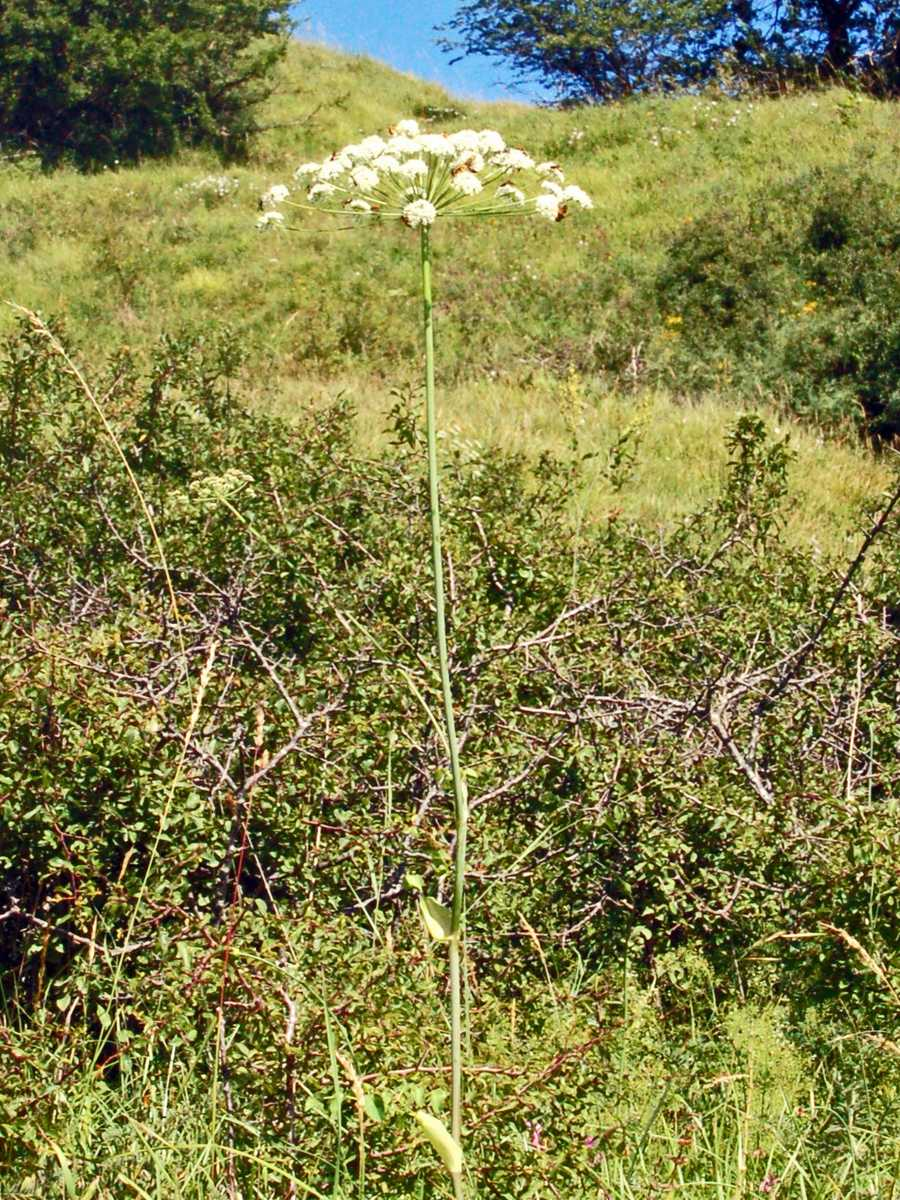

Scientific classification
- Kingdom: Plantae
- Clade: Tracheophytes
- Clade: Angiosperms
- Clade: Eudicots
- Clade: Asterids
- Order: Apiales
- Family: Apiaceae
- Genus: Laserpitium
- Species: L. latifolium

Binomial name
- Laserpitium latifolium L.

= Laserpitium latifolium =

Species of flowering plant

Laserpitium latifolium, common name broad-leaved sermountain, is an herbaceous perennial plant in the genus Laserpitium of the family Apiaceae.

== Description ==
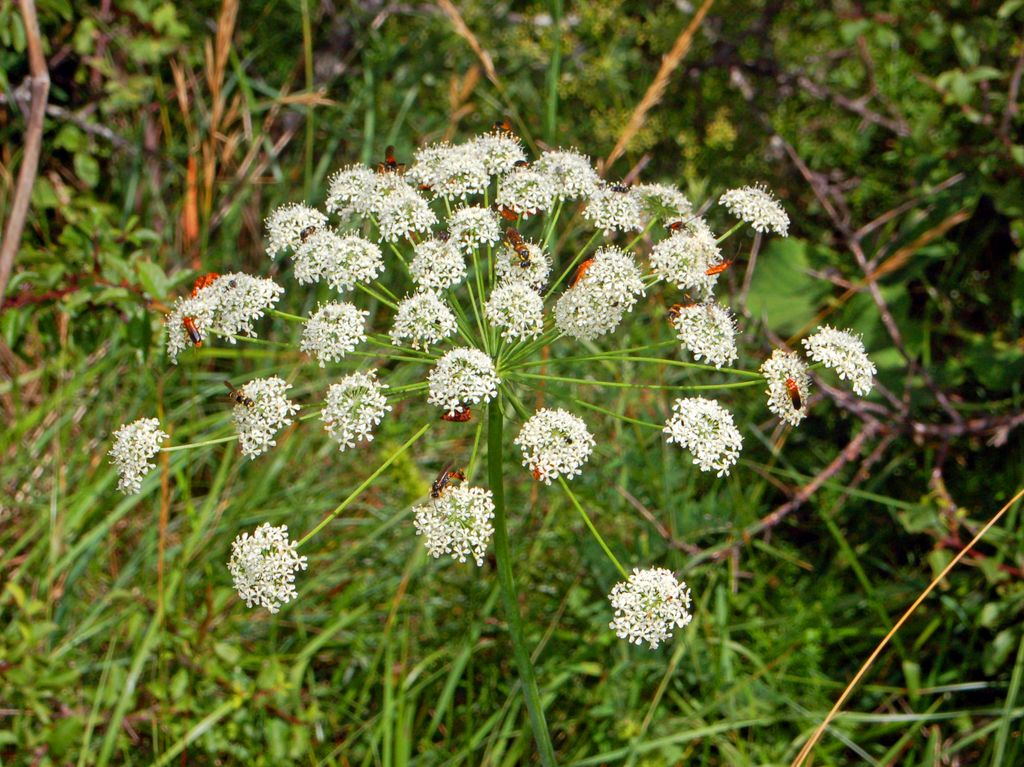
Close-up of flowers of Laserpitium latifolium

Laserpitium latifolium reaches an average height of 50 to 150 centimetres (20 to 59 in). The inflorescence has a diameter of 10 to 15 centimetres (3.9 to 5.9 in). The stem is greenish-gray, round, erect, and lightly grooved, and it is branched at the top. The leaves are quite large, biternate, and petiolated, with a prominent central rib. The leaflets are ovate or heart-shaped and toothed. The leaves are 3 to 10 centimetres (1.2 to 3.9 in) long and 2 to 6 centimetres (0.79 to 2.36 in) wide. The flowers are white, clustered in umbrels of 25 to 40 rays. The diameter of the umbels reaches 20 to 30 centimetres (7.9 to 11.8 in). The flowering season is from May to August. Fruits are oblong and flattened, 5 to 10 millimetres (0.20 to 0.39 in) long.

== Distribution ==
It is widespread in most of Europe except Albania, Great Britain, Greece, Ireland, the Netherlands, and Portugal. It has been introduced in Belgium.

== Habitat ==
It grows in mountain dry forests, on grassy slopes, on the sunny edges of woods, or in meadows. It prefers calcareous soils and a nutrient-rich substrate, at an elevation of 400 to 2,100 metres (1,300 to 6,900 ft).

== Gallery ==
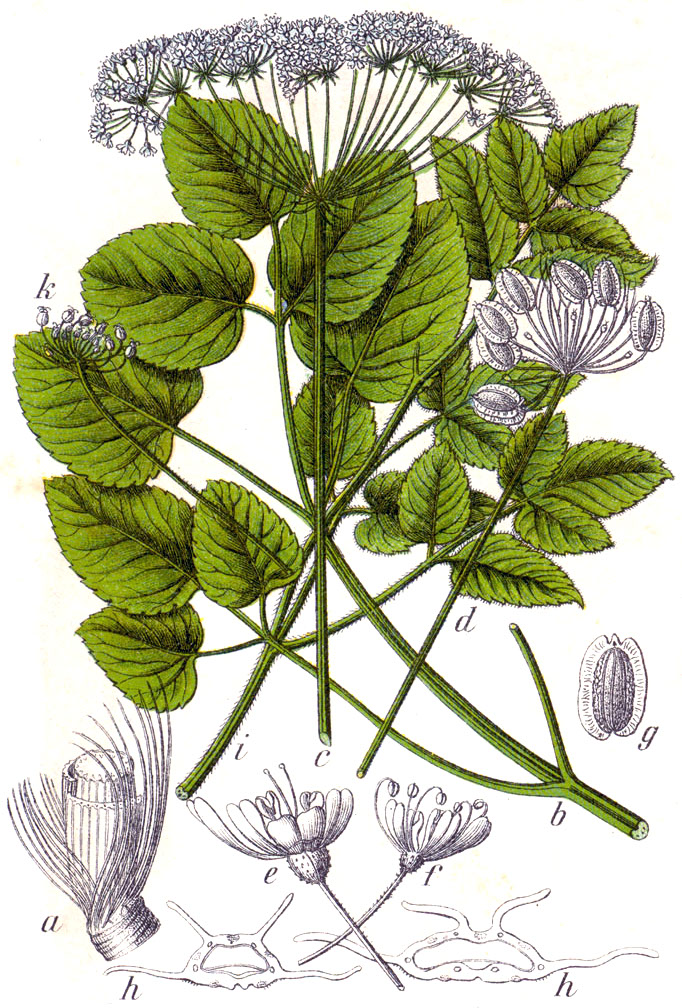
Laserpitium latifolium; figure from Deutschlands Flora in Abbildungen

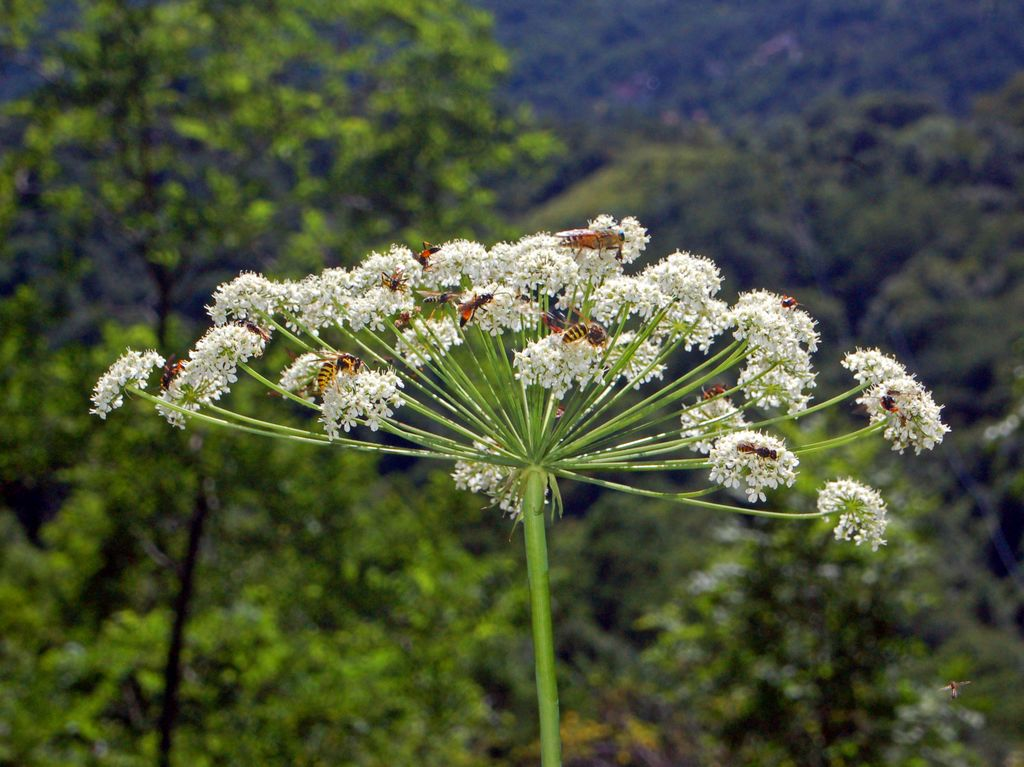
Close-up of flowers of Laserpitium latifolium

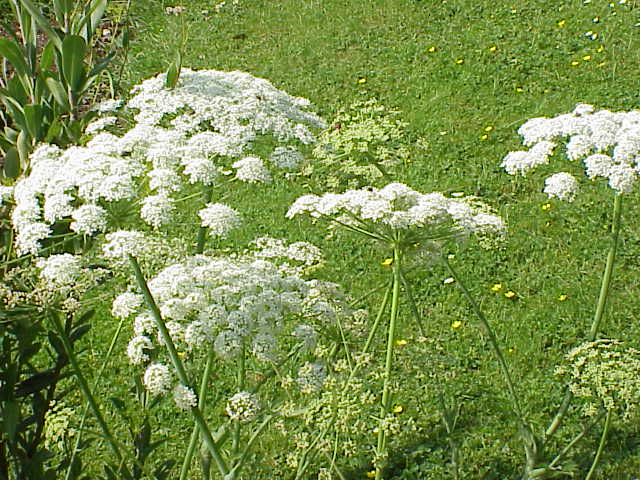
Flowers of Laserpitium latifolium

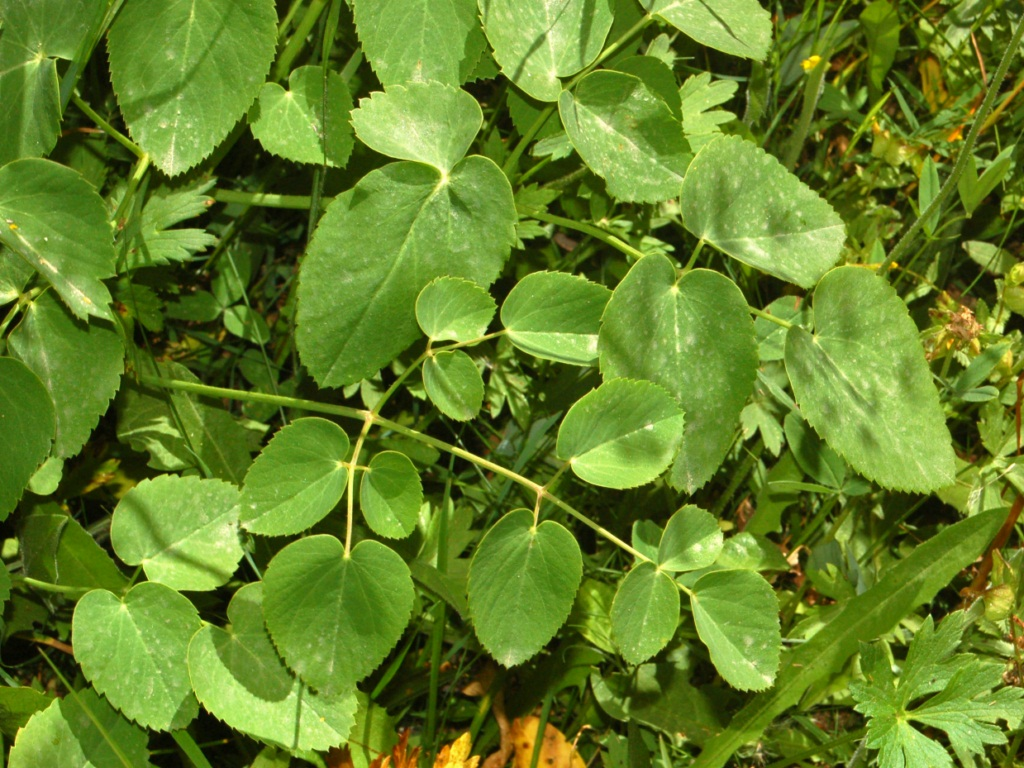
Leaves of Laserpitium latifolium
