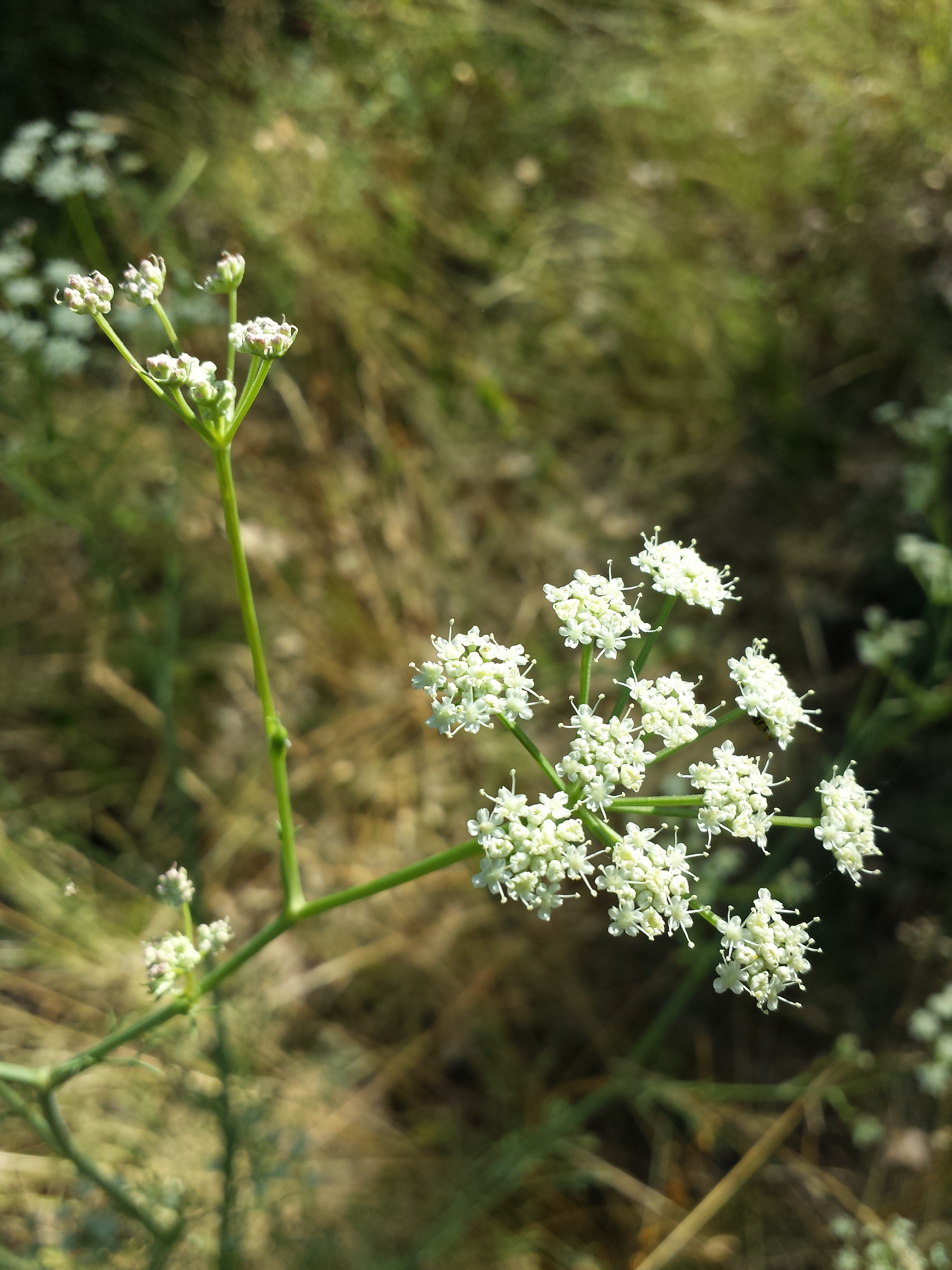

Scientific classification
- Kingdom: Plantae
- Clade: Embryophytes
- Clade: Tracheophytes
- Clade: Spermatophytes
- Clade: Angiosperms
- Clade: Eudicots
- Clade: Asterids
- Order: Apiales
- Family: Apiaceae
- Genus: Seseli
- Species: S. campestre

Binomial name
- Seseli campestre Besser

Synonyms
- Seseli rubellum Post

= Seseli campestre =

Species of flowering plant

Seseli campestre is a species of flowering herbaceous plant in the genus Seseli. It is a member of the carrot family, Apiaceae. It is native to Eastern Europe, portions of Southeastern Europe, Anatolia, and parts of Syria.

== Description ==
The plant can grow to up 1 m (39 in), with grooved, glabrous stems with numerous branches, ranging in color from green to slightly purple. The flowers form 7–10 radiating inflorescences ranging from 5–20 mm (0.2–0.8 in), with 10–14 umbels of white or lightly purple petals. As with the Apiaceae family at large, the fruits are schizocarpic. The fruits are ovoid, with ridges on the dorsal side, 2.8–3.2 mm (0.11–0.13 in) by 1.6–1.8 mm (0.06–0.07 in) in size, and turn light-brown as the seeds develop.

== Ecology ==
Seseli campestre is a perennial. It is native in Romania, Bulgaria, Crimea, Ukraine, central and south European Russia, European and Anatolian Turkey, Lebanon, Syria, and North Caucasus. It grows on black soils, steppes, and slopes, in chalky places, but rarely grows in fields. In Turkey it grows on dry hillsides and between altitudes of sea level to 500 m (1,600 ft) in Northwest and South Anatolia. It has been observed as a host for the fungus Puccinia libanotidis, moon carrot rust, though the fungus more commonly infects its namesake, Seseli libanotis, the moon carrot.

== Uses ==
Several essential oils can be extracted from S. campestre. One study identified 97 compounds in the fruit and 102 compounds from the aerial parts of the plant, and a second study identified 30 compounds from the aerial parts. which α-pinene, β-pinene, and (E)-sesquilavandulol take up the largest proportions of the analyzed oils. Of these, (E)-sesquilavandulol is uncommon among Seseli, being found principally in S. campestre and S. globiferum. Investigations of the essential oils S. campestre, as with other members of Seseli, suggest significant antioxidant, as well as potential anti-inflammatory and analgesic, effects.
