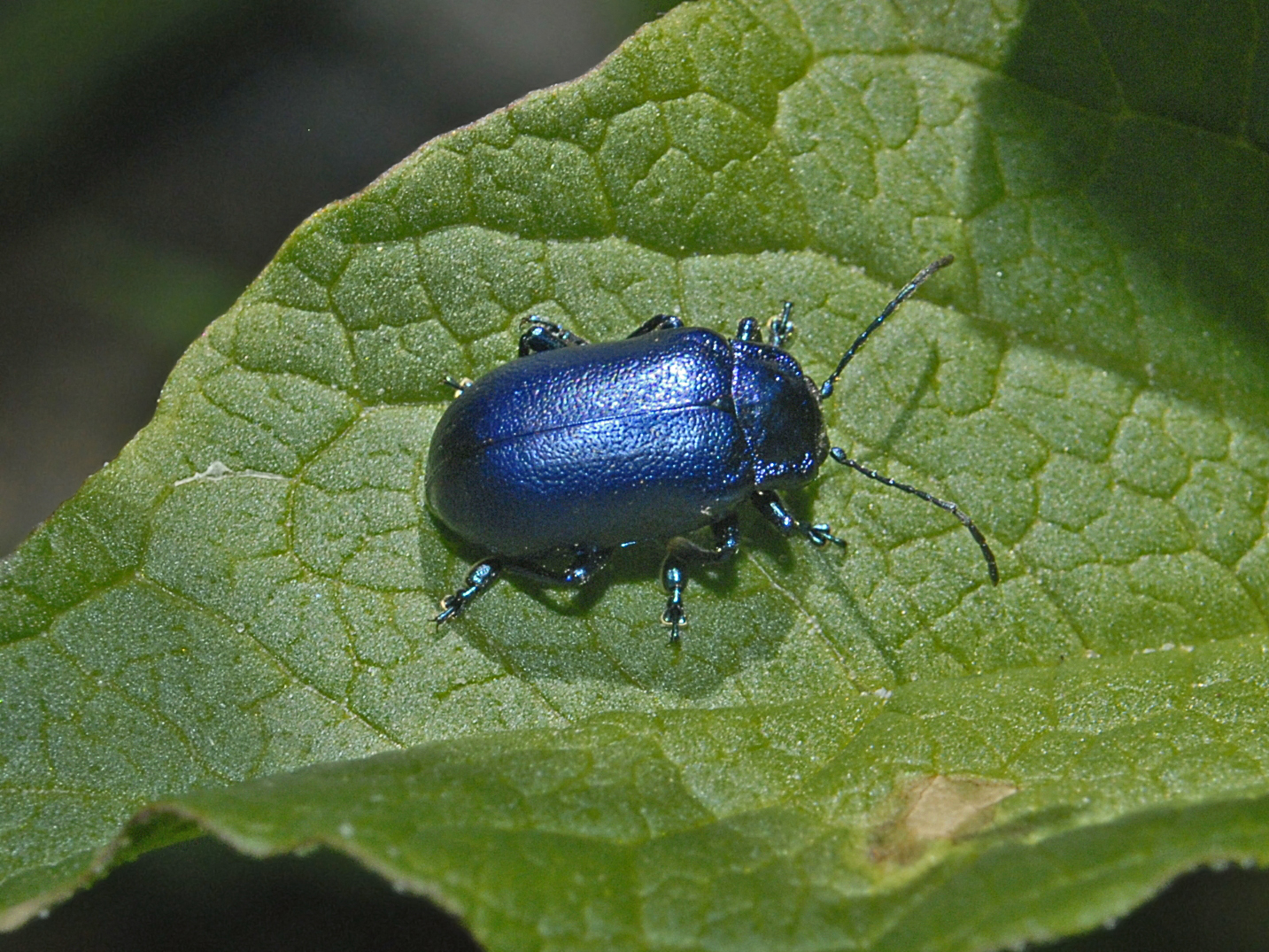

Scientific classification
- Kingdom: Animalia
- Phylum: Arthropoda
- Clade: Pancrustacea
- Class: Insecta
- Order: Coleoptera
- Suborder: Polyphaga
- Infraorder: Cucujiformia
- Family: Chrysomelidae
- Genus: Oreina
- Species: O. cacaliae

Binomial name
- Oreina cacaliae (Schrank, 1785)

Synonyms
- Chrysochloa cacaliae (Schrank) Auctorum; Chrysochloa coerulea Olivier, 1790 nec De Villers, 1789; Chrysochloa sumptuosa Redtenbacher, 1849; Chrysomela cacaliae Schrank, 1785

= Oreina cacaliae =

Species of beetle

Oreina cacaliae is a species of broad-shouldered leaf beetles belonging to the family Chrysomelidae, subfamily Chrysomelinae.

== Subspecies ==
- Oreina cacaliae albanica (Müller G., 1948)
- Oreina cacaliae barii (Schatzmayr, 1943)
- Oreina cacaliae bohemica (Weise, 1889)
- Oreina cacaliae cacaliae (Schrank, 1785)
- Oreina cacaliae dinarica (Apfelbeck, 1912)
- Oreina cacaliae magistrettii (Schatzmayr, 1941)
- Oreina cacaliae marani (Fassati, 1961)
- Oreina cacaliae senecionis (Schummel, 1843)
- Oreina cacaliae senilis (K. Daniel, 1903)
- Oreina cacaliae tristis (Fabricius, 1792)

== Description ==
Oreina cacaliae can reach a length of 9–10 millimetres (0.35–0.39 in). Elytra are bright metallic bluish or greenish, with darker longitudinal stripes. The main host plants are Adenostyles alliariae and Petasites paradoxus.

== Distribution ==
This broad-shouldered leaf beetle can be found in Europe (Alps, Sudetes, Carpathian Mountains).

== Habitat ==
Oreina cacaliae prefers middle and high mountain areas, at an elevation up to 2,000 metres (6,600 ft) above sea level.
