= Silphiodaucus =

Scientific classification
- Kingdom: Plantae
- Clade: Tracheophytes
- Clade: Angiosperms
- Clade: Eudicots
- Clade: Asterids
- Order: Apiales
- Family: Apiaceae
- Genus: Silphiodaucus (Koso-Pol.) Spalik, Wojew., Banasiak, Piwczynski & Reduron

Genus of flowering plants

Silphiodaucus is a genus of flowering plants belonging to the family Apiaceae.

Its native range is Europe to Caucasus.

Species:

- Silphiodaucus hispidus (M.Bieb.) Spalik, Wojew., Banasiak, Piwczynski & Reduron
- Silphiodaucus prutenicus (L.) Spalik, Wojew., Banasiak, Piwczynski & Reduron
