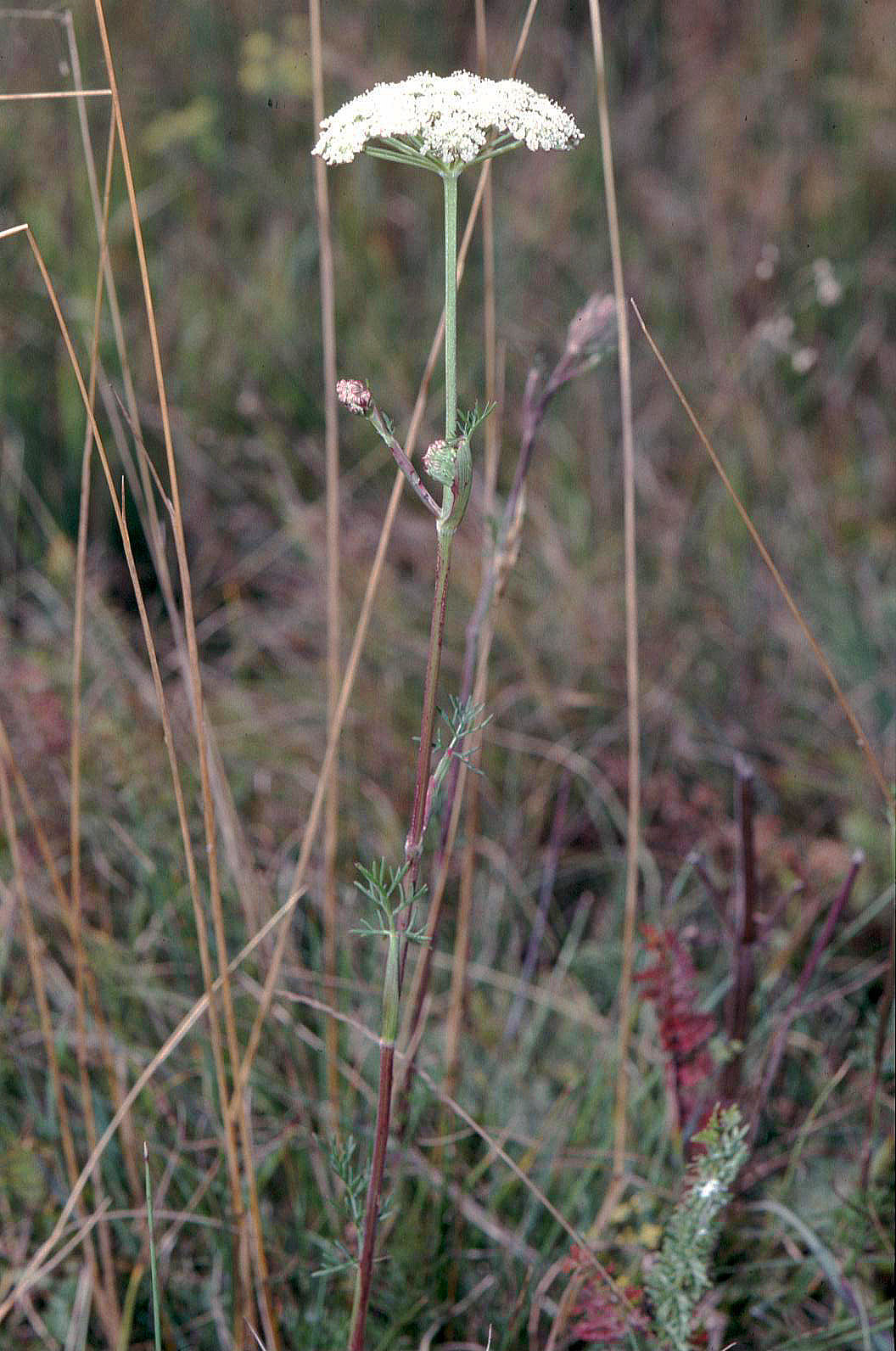

Scientific classification
- Kingdom: Plantae
- Clade: Tracheophytes
- Clade: Angiosperms
- Clade: Eudicots
- Clade: Asterids
- Order: Apiales
- Family: Apiaceae
- Genus: Seseli
- Species: S. annuum

Binomial name
- Seseli annuum L.

= Seseli annuum =

Species of flowering plant

Seseli annuum is a species of flowering plant belonging to the family Apiaceae.

Its native range is Europe.
