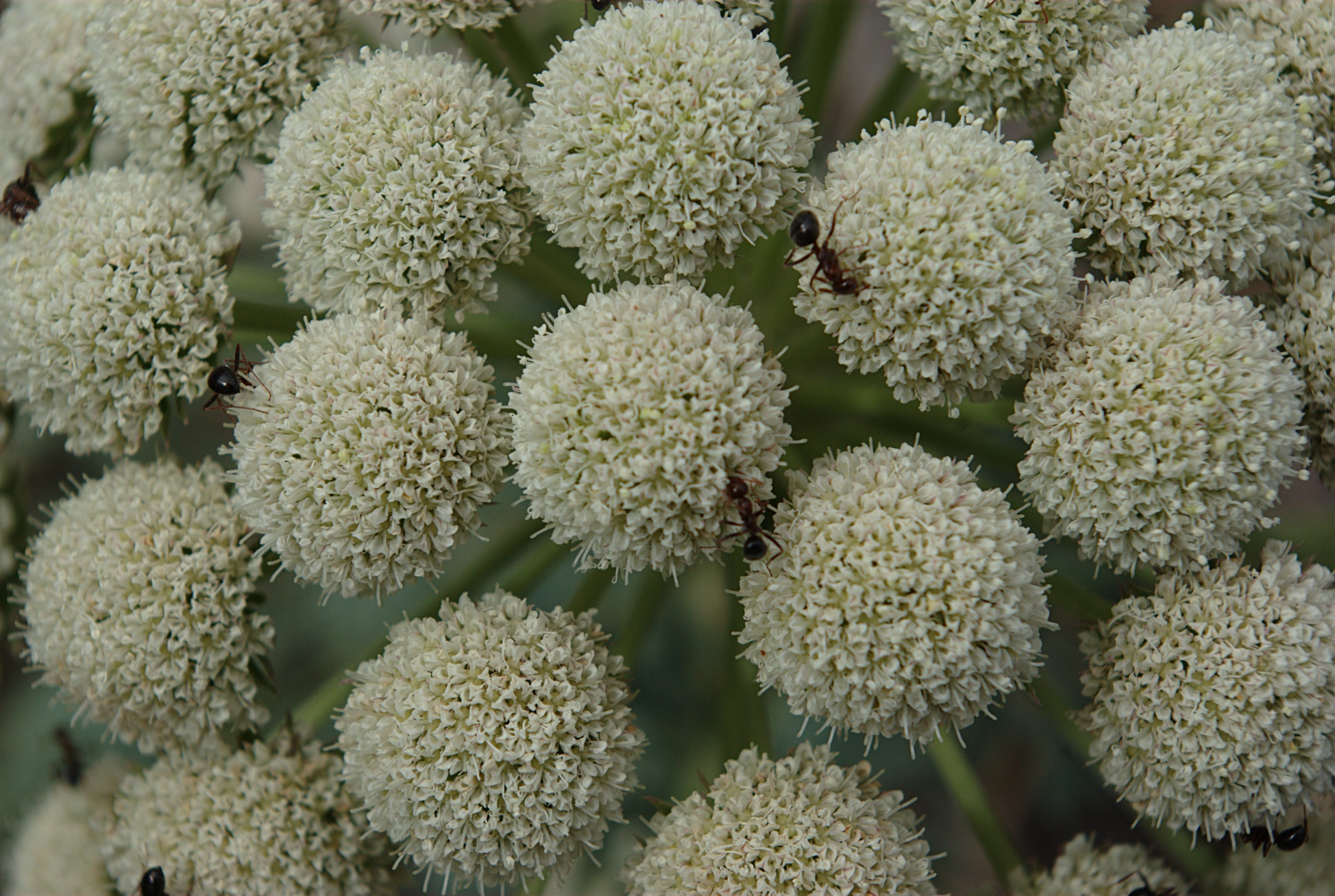
- Seseli gummiferum

Scientific classification
- Kingdom: Plantae
- Clade: Tracheophytes
- Clade: Angiosperms
- Clade: Eudicots
- Clade: Asterids
- Order: Apiales
- Family: Apiaceae
- Subfamily: Apioideae
- Tribe: Selineae
- Genus: Seseli; L.

Species
- See text.

Synonyms
- Bakeros Raf.; Balinotella Soják; Cremastosciadium Rech.f.; Dela Adans.; Elaeopleurum Korovin; Eriocycla Lindl.; Galbanophora Neck.; Gasparinia Bertol.; Hippaton Raf.; Hippomarathrum G.Gaertn., B.Mey. & Scherb.; Leiotelis Raf.; Libanotis Haller ex Zinn; Lomatopodium Fisch. & C.A.Mey.; Marathrum Link; Oreotelia Raf.; Petrosciadium Edgew.; Pseudammi H.Wolff; Scaphespermum Edgew.; Seselinia Beck; Sphenocarpus Korovin

= Seseli =

Genus of plants

Seseli is a genus of herbaceous perennial plants in the family Apiaceae. They are sometimes woody at base with a conic taproot. Leaf blades are 1–3-pinnate or pinnately decompound. Umbels are compound, with bracts few or absent. Petals are white or yellow, and the fruit ovoid or ellipsoid.

There are about 140 species in the genus.

== Species ==
As of December 2022, Plants of the World Online accepted the following 145 species:

- Seseli abolinii (Korovin) Schischk.
- Seseli acaulis (R.H.Shan & M.L.Sheh) V.M.Vinogr.
- Seseli aemulans Popov
- Seseli afghanicum (Podlech) Pimenov
- Seseli alaicum Pimenov
- Seseli albescens (Franch.) Pimenov & Kljuykov
- Seseli alboalatum (Haines) Pimenov & Kljuykov
- Seseli alexeenkoi Lipsky
- Seseli andronakii Woronow ex Schischk.
- Seseli annuum L.
- Seseli arenarium M.Bieb.
- Seseli aroanicum Hartvig
- Seseli asperulum (Trautv.) Schischk.
- Seseli atlanticum Boiss.
- Seseli austriacum (Beck) Wohlf.
- Seseli besserianum Stoyanov & Ostr.
- Seseli betpakdalense Bajtenov
- Seseli bocconei Guss.
- Seseli buchtormense (Fisch. ex Hornem.) W.D.J.Koch
- Seseli bulgaricum P.W.Ball
- Seseli calycinum (Korovin) Pimenov & Sdobnina
- Seseli campestre Besser
- Seseli cantabricum Lange
- Seseli condensatum (L.) Rchb.f.
- Seseli coreanum H.Wolff
- Seseli coronatum Ledeb.
- Seseli corymbosum Boiss. & Heldr.
- Seseli crithmifolium (Juss. ex DC.) Boiss.
- Seseli cuneifolium M.Bieb.
- Seseli degenii Urum.
- Seseli delavayi Franch.
- Seseli denudatum Boiss.
- Seseli dichotomum Pall. ex M.Bieb.
- Seseli diffusum (Roxb. ex Sm.) G.Hend. & Hume
- Seseli djianeae Gamisans
- Seseli eriocarpum (Schrenk) B.Fedtsch.
- Seseli eriocephalum (Pall. ex Spreng.) Schischk.
- Seseli eryngioides (Korovin) Pimenov & V.N.Tikhom.
- Seseli farrenyi Molero & J.Pujadas
- Seseli fasciculatum (Korovin) Korovin ex Schischk.
- Seseli foliosum (Sommier & Levier) Manden.
- Seseli galioides Lazkov
- Seseli galloprovinciale Reduron
- Seseli ghafoorianum (Akhani) Pimenov & Kljuykov
- Seseli giganteum Lipsky
- Seseli glabratum Willd. ex Schult.
- Seseli globiferum Vis.
- Seseli gouanii W.D.J.Koch
- Seseli gracile Waldst. & Kit.
- Seseli grandivittatum (Sommier & Levier) Schischk.
- Seseli grubovii V.M.Vinogr. & Sanchir
- Seseli gummiferum Pall. ex Sm.
- Seseli halkensis C.Catt., Kit Tan & Biel
- Seseli hartvigii Parolly & Nordt
- Seseli heterophyllum Janka
- Seseli hippomarathrum Jacq.
- Seseli iliense (Regel & Schmalh.) Lipsky
- Seseli × inaequale N.Terracc.
- Seseli incanum (Stephan ex Willd.) B.Fedtsch.
- Seseli incisodentatum K.T.Fu
- Seseli intramongolicum Ma
- Seseli intricatum Boiss.
- Seseli jinanense (L.C.Xu & M.D.Xu) Pimenov
- Seseli jomuticum Schischk.
- Seseli junatovii V.M.Vinogr.
- Seseli karateginum Lipsky
- Seseli kaschgaricum Pimenov & Kljuykov
- Seseli kiabii (Akhani) Akhani
- Seseli korovinii Schischk.
- Seseli korshinskyi (Schischk.) Pimenov
- Seseli krylovii (V.N.Tikhom.) Pimenov & Sdobnina
- Seseli lancifolium (K.T.Fu) Pimenov
- Seseli lanzhouense (K.T.Fu ex R.H.Shan & M.L.Sheh) V.M.Vinogr.
- Seseli laticalycinum (R.H.Shan & M.L.Sheh) Pimenov
- Seseli lehmannianum Boiss.
- Seseli lehmannii Degen
- Seseli leptocladum Woronow
- Seseli leucospermum Waldst. & Kit.
- Seseli libanotis (L.) W.D.J.Koch
- Seseli longifolium L.
- Seseli luteolum Pimenov
- Seseli mairei H.Wolff
- Seseli malyi A.Kern.
- Seseli marashica E.Doğan & H.Duman
- Seseli marginatum (Korovin) Pimenov & Sdobnina
- Seseli merkuloviczii (Korovin) Pimenov & Sdobnina
- Seseli mironovii (Korovin) Pimenov & Sdobnina
- Seseli montanum L.
- Seseli mucronatum (Schrenk) Pimenov & Sdobnina
- Seseli nemorosum (Korovin) Pimenov
- Seseli nevskii (Korovin) Pimenov & Sdobnina
- Seseli nortonii Fedde ex H.Wolff
- Seseli nudum (Lindl.) Pimenov & Kljuykov
- Seseli olivieri Boiss.
- Seseli osseum Crantz
- Seseli pallasii Besser
- Seseli parnassicum Boiss. & Heldr.
- Seseli peixotoanum Samp.
- Seseli pelliotii (H.Boissieu) Pimenov & Kljuykov
- Seseli petraeum M.Bieb.
- Seseli petrosciadium Pimenov & Kljuykov
- Seseli peucedanoides (M.Bieb.) Koso-Pol.
- Seseli polyphyllum Ten.
- Seseli ponticum Lipsky
- Seseli praecox (Gamisans) Gamisans
- Seseli purpureovaginatum R.H.Shan & M.L.Sheh
- Seseli resinosum Freyn & Sint.
- Seseli rhodopeum Velen.
- Seseli rigidum Waldst. & Kit.
- Seseli rimosum Pimenov
- Seseli roylei (Lindl.) Pimenov & Kljuykov
- Seseli rupicola Woronow
- Seseli sandbergiae Fedde ex H.Wolff
- Seseli schrenkianum (C.A.Mey. ex Schischk.) Pimenov & Sdobnina
- Seseli sclerophyllum Korovin
- Seseli scopulorum C.C.Towns.
- Seseli seravschanicum Pimenov & Sdobnina
- Seseli serpentina B.L.Burtt ex H.Duman & E.Doğan
- Seseli seseloides (Fisch. & C.A.Mey. ex Ledeb.) M.Hiroe
- Seseli sessiliflorum Schrenk
- Seseli setifera (Korovin ex Pavlov) M.Hiroe
- Seseli sibiricum (L.) Garcke
- Seseli sibthorpii Gren. & Godr.
- Seseli squarrulosum R.H.Shan & M.L.Sheh
- Seseli staintonii (Riedl & Kuber) Pimenov & Kljuykov
- Seseli staurophyllum Rech.f.
- Seseli stewartii (M.Hiroe) Pimenov & Kljuykov
- Seseli strictum Ledeb.
- Seseli talassicum (Korovin) Pimenov & Sdobnina
- Seseli tenellum Pimenov
- Seseli tenuisectum Regel & Schmalh.
- Seseli thomsonii (C.B.Clarke) Pimenov & Kljuykov
- Seseli togasii (M.Hiroe) Pimenov & Kljuykov
- Seseli tommasinii Rchb.f.
- Seseli tortuosum L.
- Seseli tragioides Pimenov
- Seseli transcaucasicum (Schischk.) Pimenov & Sdobnina
- Seseli turbinatum Korovin
- Seseli ugoense Koidz.
- Seseli unicaule (Korovin) Pimenov
- Seseli valentinae Popov
- Seseli vandasii Hayek
- Seseli veitchii (H.Boissieu) Pimenov
- Seseli wannienchun (K.T.Fu) Pimenov
- Seseli yunnanense Franch.
- Seseli kurdistanicum Lyskov & Fırat,
