= Laserocarpum =

Scientific classification
- Kingdom: Plantae
- Clade: Tracheophytes
- Clade: Angiosperms
- Clade: Eudicots
- Clade: Asterids
- Order: Apiales
- Family: Apiaceae
- Genus: Laserocarpum; Spalik & Wojew.
- Species: L. pseudomeum

Binomial name
- Laserocarpum pseudomeum (Orph., Heldr. & Sartori ex Boiss.) Spalik, Wojew., Constantin. & S.R.Downie

Synonyms
- Laserpitium pseudomeum Orph., Heldr. & Sartori ex Boiss.

Genus of flowering plants

Laserocarpum is a genus of flowering plants in the family Apiaceae. It includes a single species, Laserocarpum pseudomeum, a perennial endemic to central and southern Greece.
