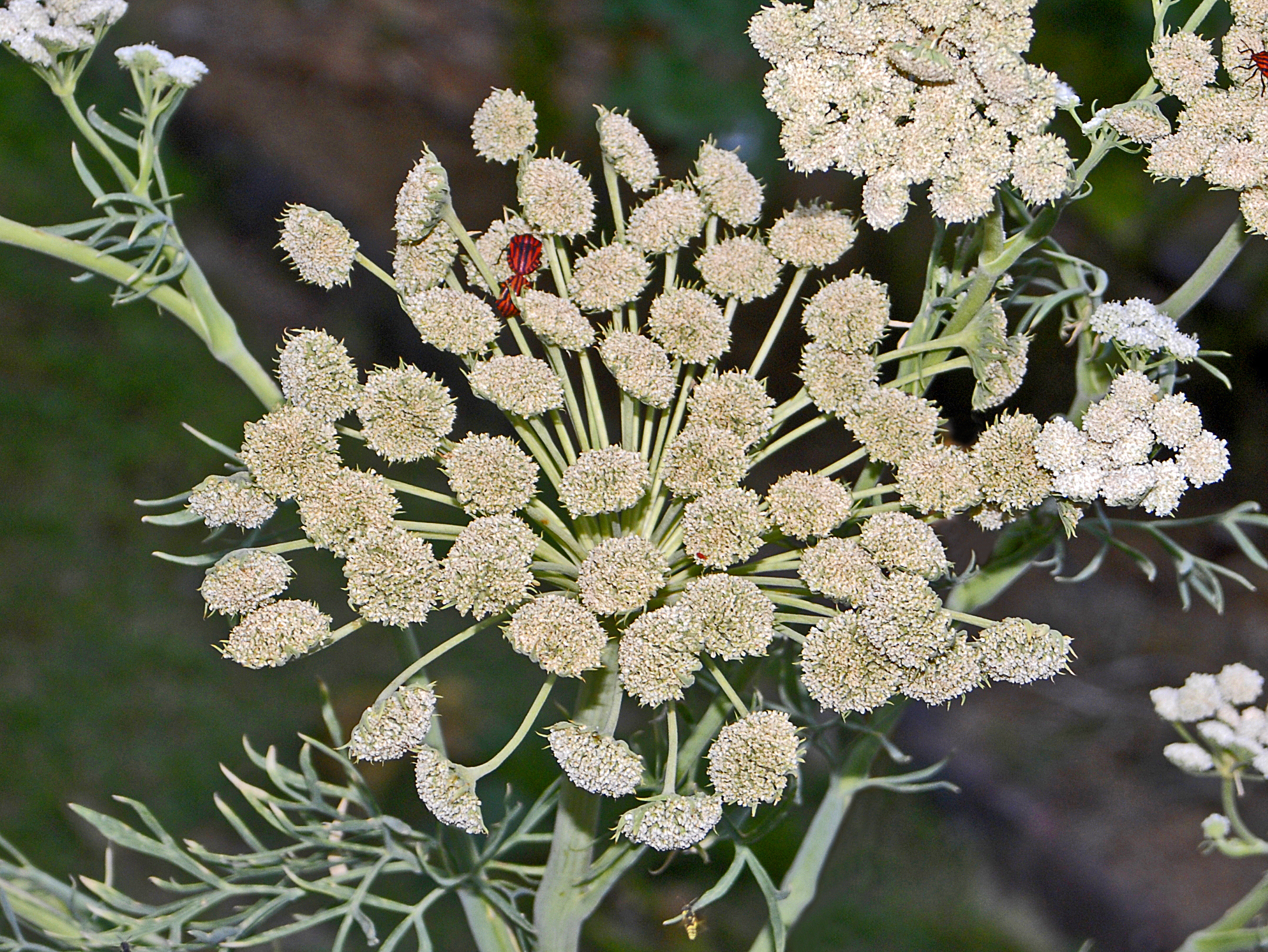
- At the Orto Botanico di Brera, Milano

Scientific classification
- Kingdom: Plantae
- Clade: Tracheophytes
- Clade: Angiosperms
- Clade: Eudicots
- Clade: Asterids
- Order: Apiales
- Family: Apiaceae
- Genus: Seseli
- Species: S. gummiferum

Binomial name
- Seseli gummiferum Pall. ex Sm.

= Seseli gummiferum =

Species of herbaceous perennial plant

Seseli gummiferum, the sticky moon carrot, is a species of herbaceous perennial plant belonging to tribe Selineae of the family Apiaceae.

== Description ==
Seseli gummiferum can reach a height of about 1.4 metres (4 ft 7 in). It has a thick, branching stem with a basal rosette of greyish—green leaves and five-inch umbels of white flowers, sometimes with a pink tinge. This plant flowers from July to September.

== Distribution ==
Seseli gummiferum occurs in Eastern Europe, the Aegean and Crimea.

== Habitat ==
It grows in rocky mountainous areas, on limestone cliffs at elevations up to 1,000 metres (3,300 ft).

== Gallery ==
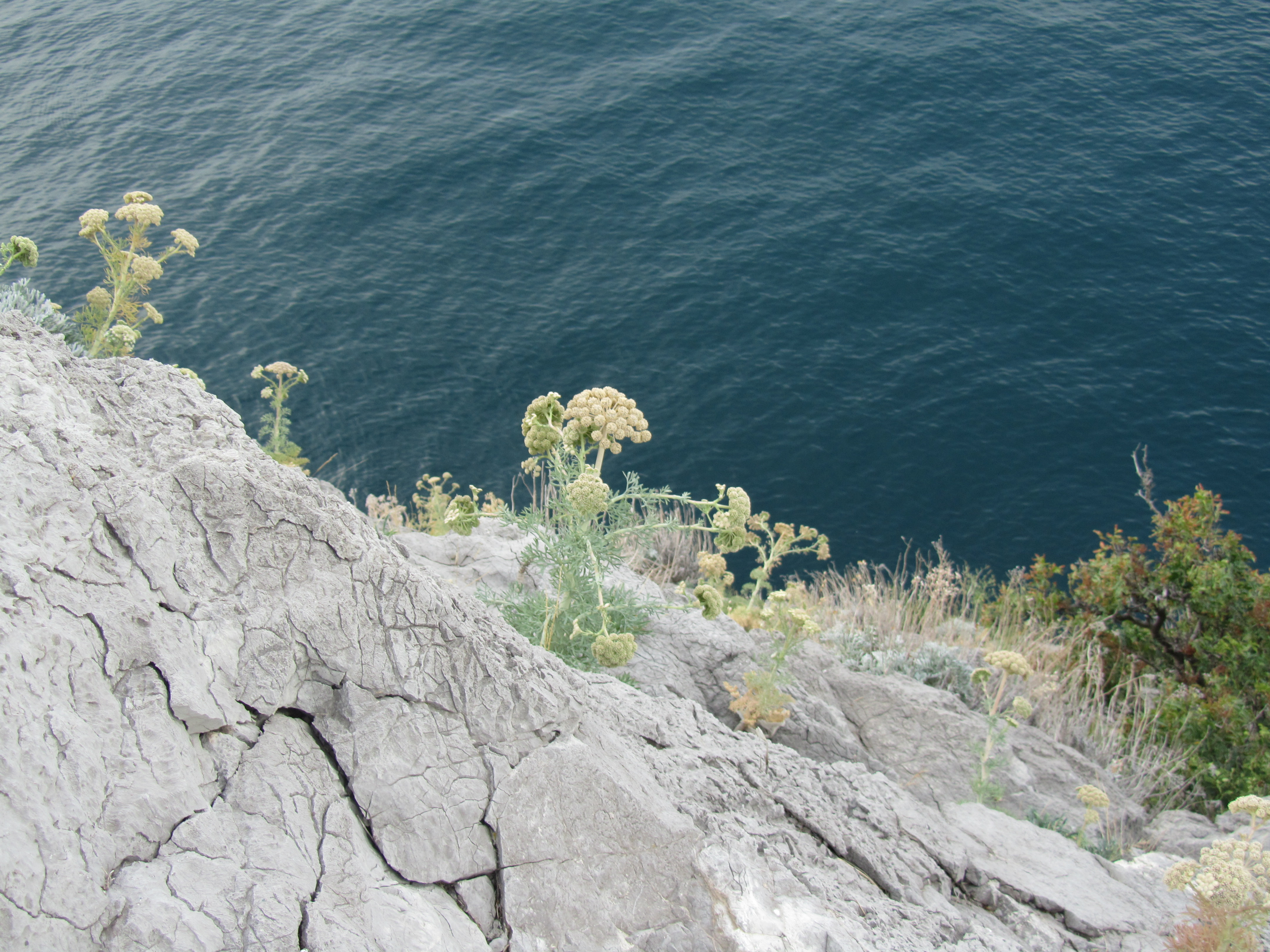
Wild plants flowering on the limestone cliffs of Diva rock, Simeiz,
southwestern Crimea

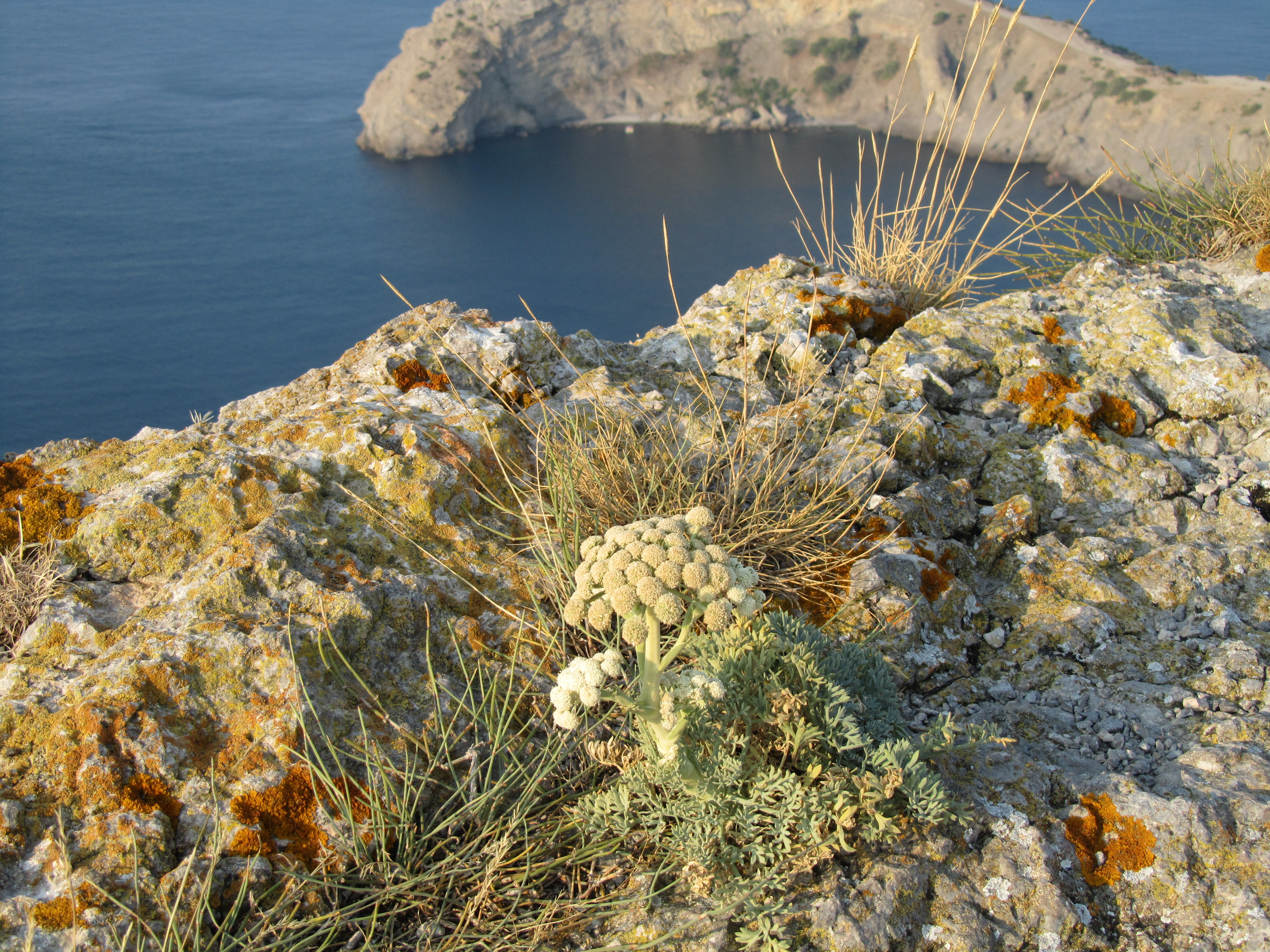
Mid-shot of wild specimen flowering on the summit of Koba-Koi, Novyi Svit, southeastern Crimea.
