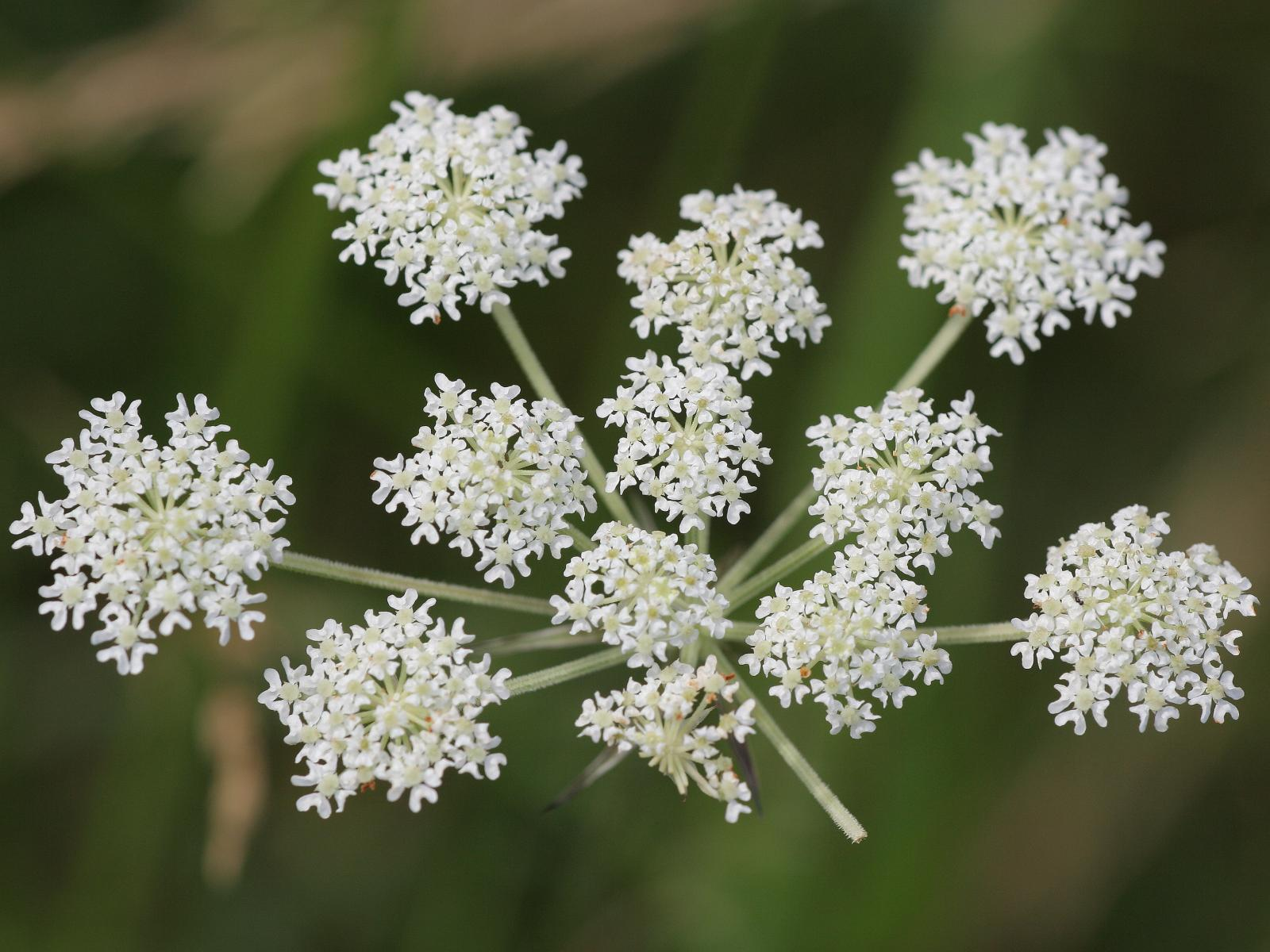

Scientific classification
- Kingdom: Plantae
- Clade: Tracheophytes
- Clade: Angiosperms
- Clade: Eudicots
- Clade: Asterids
- Order: Apiales
- Family: Apiaceae
- Genus: Silphiodaucus
- Species: S. prutenicus

Binomial name
- Silphiodaucus prutenicus (L.) Spalik, Wojew., Banasiak, Piwczynski & Reduron

= Silphiodaucus prutenicus =

Species of flowering plant

Silphiodaucus prutenicus is a species of flowering plant belonging to the family Apiaceae.

Its native range is Central, Eastern and Southern Europe.

Synonym:

- Laserpitium prutenicum L.
