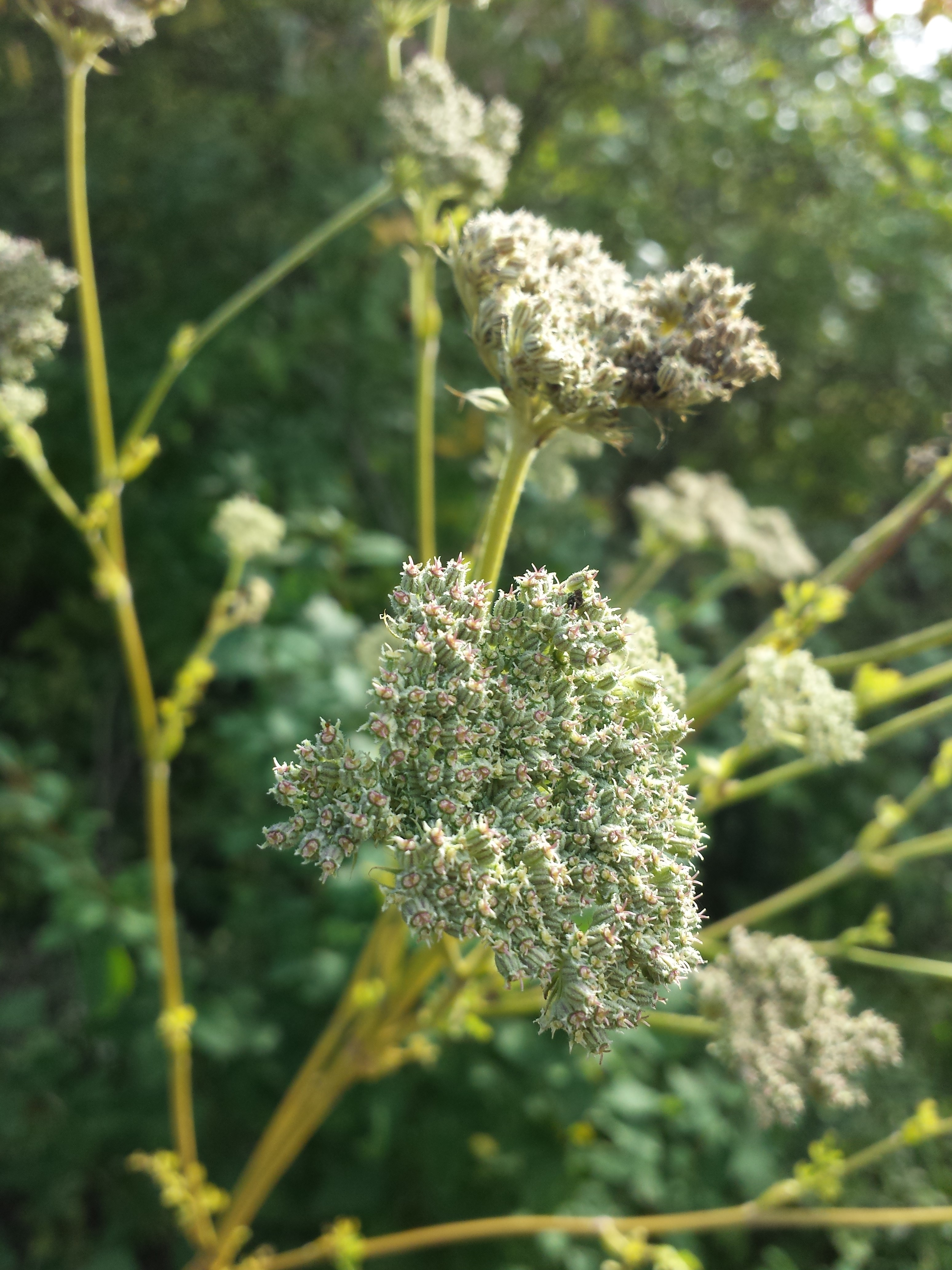

Scientific classification
- Kingdom: Plantae
- Clade: Tracheophytes
- Clade: Angiosperms
- Clade: Eudicots
- Clade: Asterids
- Order: Apiales
- Family: Apiaceae
- Genus: Seseli
- Species: S. libanotis

Binomial name
- Seseli libanotis (L.) W.D.J. Koch

Synonyms
- Athamanta libanotis L.; Libanotis pyrenaica (L.) Bourg; L. montana Crantz

= Seseli libanotis =

Species of plant

Seseli libanotis, also known by the common names moon carrot, mountain stone-parsley, or säfferot, is a species of herb in the genus Seseli of the carrot family, Apiaceae. It is native to Eurasia, throughout which it is widespread.

== Description ==
Seseli libanotis grows 40–120 centimetres (16–47 in) high, with erect, branching stems. The leaves follow an alternating pattern, with lower leaves stalked and upper leaves stalkless. The undersides of leaflets are bluish green. The flowers grow to under 5 millimetres (0.20 in) wide and are white, sometimes slightly reddish. The flowers follow an actinomorphic or slightly irregular zygomorphic pattern and form umbels consisting of as many as sixty flowers, with many umbels forming smaller umbels of their own. The fruit is a flat, two-sectioned, egg-shaped schizocarp that is brown in color and slightly hairy in texture, and usually grows to 2.5–4 centimetres (0.98–1.57 in) long. Three subspecies have been identified: S. l. intermedium, S. l. libanotis, and S. l. sibiricum.

== Ecology ==
Seseli libanotis is usually a biennial, though sometimes grows as a monocarpic perennial. It flowers during July and August. Favoring a temperate environment, its natural distribution ranges throughout much of northern and central Eurasia and parts of North Africa, from England and Scandinavia to Siberia, and is prevalent in the Carpathian Mountains. It prefers rocky terrain, grassy slopes, or shrubbed areas, with dry, well-drained soil. In Britain, it is found entirely within SSSIs, growing on chalky terrain in the Chiltern Hills and South Downs. The plant has also been introduced to Maryland in the United States. S. libanotis has been identified as invasive. It has not been evaluated by the IUCN, though it is rare in Britain and classified there as Near Threatened.

Seseli libanotis serves, along with S. campestre, as the host species for the parasitic Puccinia libanotidis, or moon carrot rust, a species of the rust genus Puccinia. P. libanotidis was long thought extinct from Britain, having not been recorded since 1946, but it was rediscovered in 2009 through a study by Kew Gardens.

== Uses ==
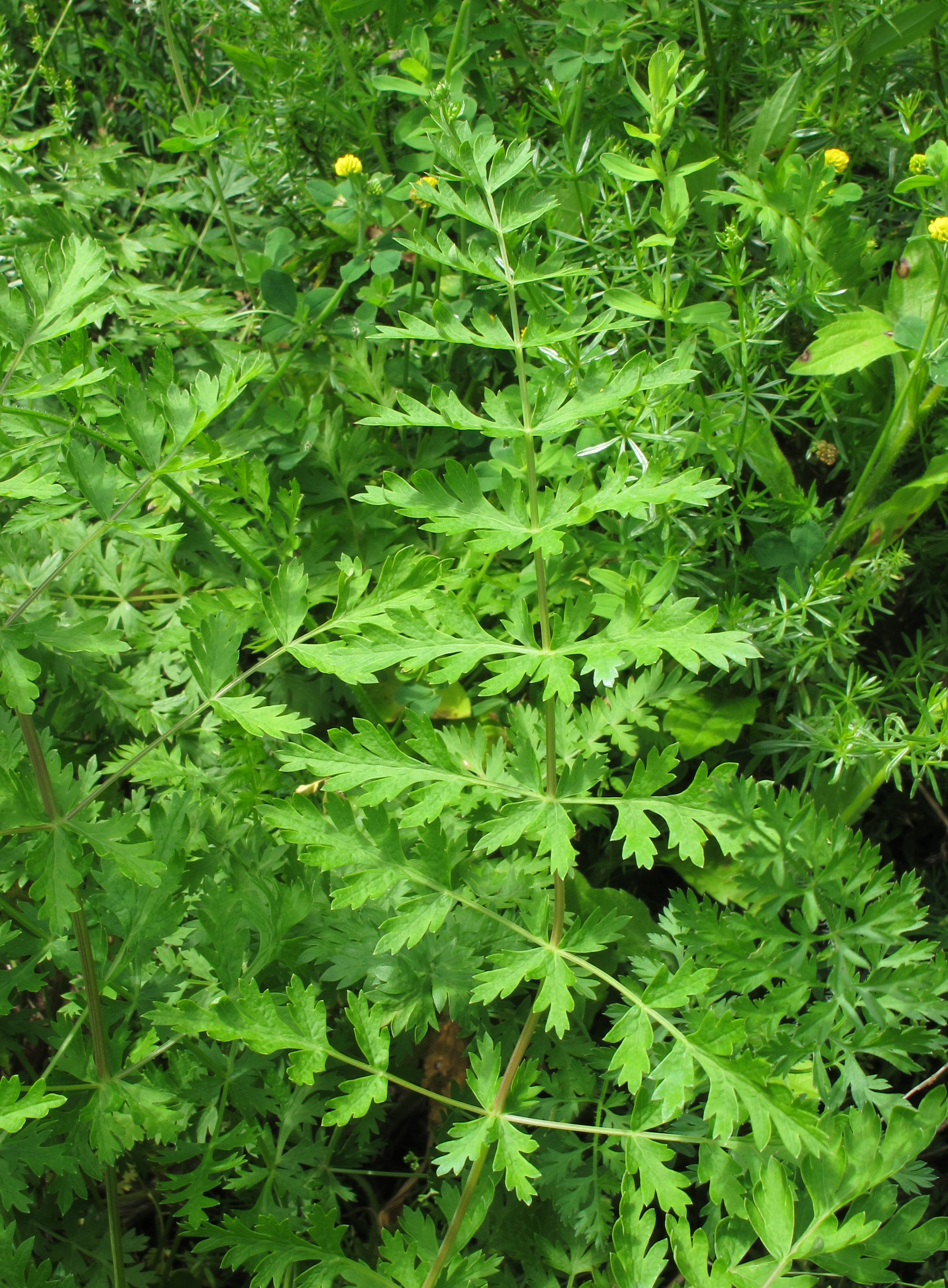
Leaf of Seseli libanotis

The leaves and root are edible. The leaves are used in Eastern Turkey in salads. S. libanotis is useful in honey production and has also been used in folk medicine. Several studies suggest that S. libanotis and other members of Seseli have natural antimicrobial and antioxidant properties.
