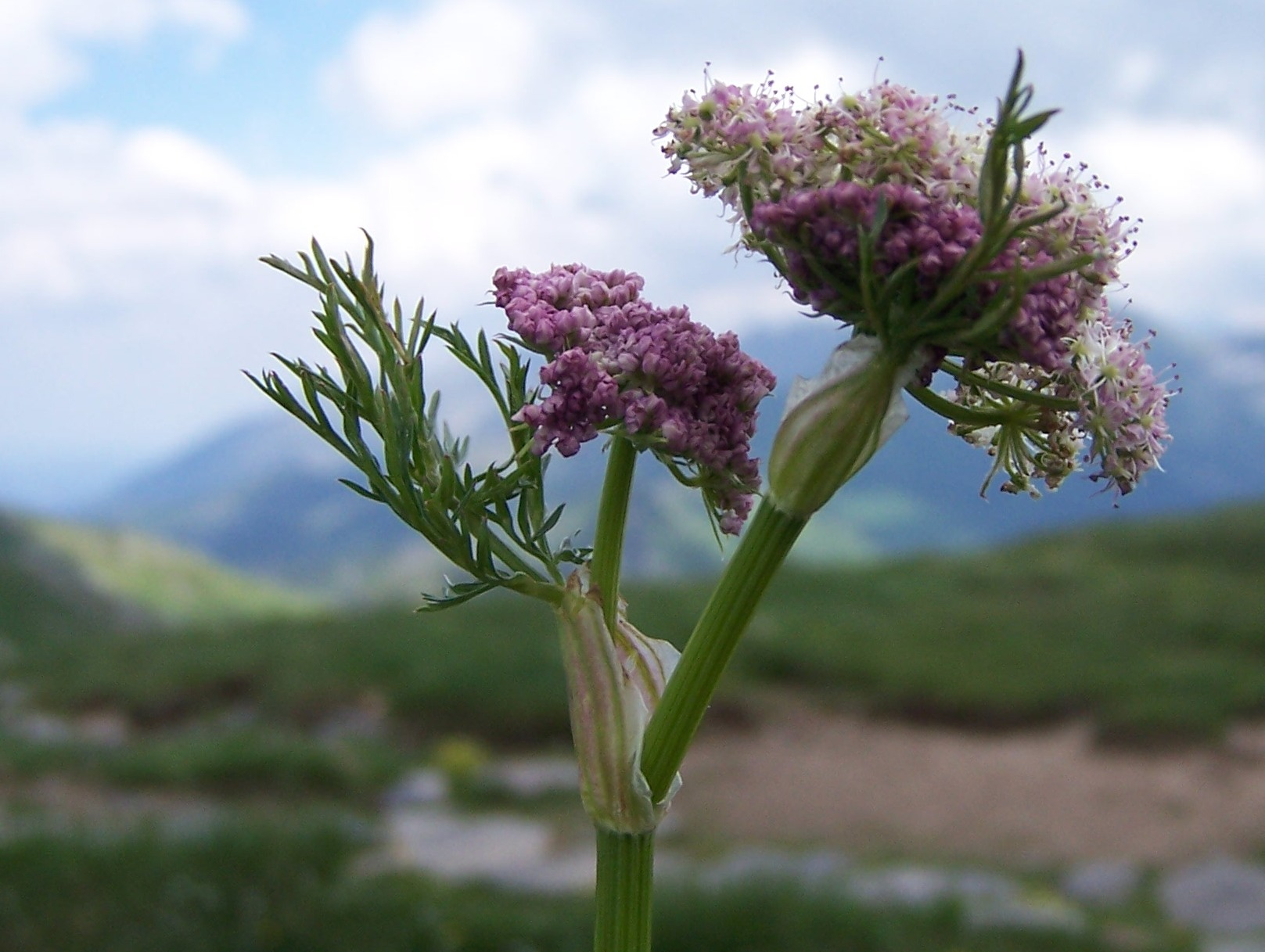
- Mutelina purpurea

Scientific classification
- Kingdom: Plantae
- Clade: Tracheophytes
- Clade: Angiosperms
- Clade: Eudicots
- Clade: Asterids
- Order: Apiales
- Family: Apiaceae
- Subfamily: Apioideae
- Genus: Mutellina; Wolf

= Mutellina =

Genus of plants

Mutellina is a genus of flowering plants belonging to the family Apiaceae.

Its native range is Europe.

Species:

- Mutellina caucasica (Sommier & Levier) T.V.Lavrova
- Mutellina corsica (J.Gay) Reduron, Charpin & Pimenov
- Mutellina purpurea (Poir.) Reduron, Charpin & Pimenov
