= Mutellina purpurea =

Scientific classification
- Kingdom: Plantae
- Clade: Tracheophytes
- Clade: Angiosperms
- Clade: Eudicots
- Clade: Asterids
- Order: Apiales
- Family: Apiaceae
- Genus: Mutellina
- Species: M. purpurea

Binomial name
- Mutellina purpurea (Poir.) Reduron, Charpin & Pimenov

Species of flowering plant

Mutellina purpurea is a species of flowering plant in the family Apiaceae native to Europe.
