= Harbouria =

Conservation status
- Vulnerable (NatureServe)

Scientific classification
- Kingdom: Plantae
- Clade: Tracheophytes
- Clade: Angiosperms
- Clade: Eudicots
- Clade: Asterids
- Order: Apiales
- Family: Apiaceae
- Subfamily: Apioideae
- Tribe: Selineae
- Genus: Harbouria; J.M.Coult. & Rose
- Species: H. trachypleura

Binomial name
- Harbouria trachypleura (A.Gray) J.M.Coult. & Rose

Synonyms
- Cicuta trachypleura (A.Gray) S.Watson; Thaspium trachypleurum A.Gray

Genus of flowering plant

Harbouria is a monotypic genus of flowering plants belonging to the family Apiaceae. It contains just one species, Harbouria trachypleura (A.Gray) J.M.Coult. & Rose, native to the states of Colorado, New Mexico and Wyoming.

The genus name of Harbouria is in honour of Jared Patterson Harbour (1831–1917), an American plant collector in the Rocky Mountains of North America. The Latin specific epithet of trachypleura is derived from two Greek words; τραχύς (trakhús) meaning 'rough' and πλευρά (pleurá), πλευρόν (pleurón) meaning 'rib, side'. It was first described in 1888.
