= Kamelinia =

Scientific classification
- Kingdom: Plantae
- Clade: Tracheophytes
- Clade: Angiosperms
- Clade: Eudicots
- Clade: Asterids
- Order: Apiales
- Family: Apiaceae
- Subfamily: Apioideae
- Tribe: Pleurospermeae
- Genus: Kamelinia; F.O.Khass. & I.I.Malzev
- Species: K. tianschanica

Binomial name
- Kamelinia tianschanica F.O.Khass. & I.I.Malzev

Genus of plants

Kamelinia is a monotypic genus of flowering plants belonging to the family Apiaceae. It contains only one species, Kamelinia tianschanica.

It is native to Kazakhstan in Central Asia.

The genus name of Kamelinia is in honour of Rudolf Vladimirovich Kamelin (1938–2016), a Russian botanist at the university in Saint Petersburg and was interested in plant systematics and distribution. The Latin specific epithet of tianschanica refers to coming from Tian Shan mountain range in Central Asia.

Both genus and species were first described and published in Uzbeksk. Biol. Zhurn. 1992 (Vol.2) on pages 50-51 in 1992.
