= Stefanoffia =

Scientific classification
- Kingdom: Plantae
- Clade: Tracheophytes
- Clade: Angiosperms
- Clade: Eudicots
- Clade: Asterids
- Order: Apiales
- Family: Apiaceae
- Subfamily: Apioideae
- Genus: Stefanoffia; H.Wolff

Genus of flowering plant

Stefanoffia is a genus of flowering plants belonging to the family Apiaceae.

It is native to Bulgaria and Greece in southeastern Europe and in Turkey.

The genus name of Stefanoffia is in honour of Boris Stefanoff (1894–1979), a Bulgarian botanist and curator at the herbarium of Sofia University. It was first described and published in Notizbl. Bot. Gart. Berlin-Dahlem Vol.9 on page 282 in 1925.

Known species, according to Kew:

- Stefanoffia daucoides (Boiss.) H.Wolff
- Stefanoffia insoluta Kljuykov
