= Harrysmithia =

Scientific classification
- Kingdom: Plantae
- Clade: Tracheophytes
- Clade: Angiosperms
- Clade: Eudicots
- Clade: Asterids
- Order: Apiales
- Family: Apiaceae
- Subfamily: Apioideae
- Genus: Harrysmithia; H.Wolff

Genus of plants

Harrysmithia is a genus of flowering plants belonging to the family Apiaceae.

It is native to Tibet and southern central China.

The genus name of Harrysmithia is in honour of Karl August Harald Smith (1889–1971), Swedish and American botanist and curator at the botanical museum in Uppsala. It was first described and published in Acta Horti Gothob. Vol.2 on page 310 in 1926.

Known species, according to Kew:

- Harrysmithia franchetii (M.Hiroe) M.L.Sheh
- Harrysmithia heterophylla H.Wolff
