= Oreofraga =

Conservation status
- Vulnerable (IUCN 3.1)

Scientific classification
- Kingdom: Plantae
- Clade: Tracheophytes
- Clade: Angiosperms
- Clade: Eudicots
- Clade: Asterids
- Order: Apiales
- Family: Apiaceae
- Subfamily: Apioideae
- Tribe: Heteromorpheae
- Clade: Malagasy clade
- Genus: Oreofraga; M.F.Watson & E.L.Barclay
- Species: O. morrisiana

Binomial name
- Oreofraga morrisiana M.F.Watson & E.L.Barclay

Genus of flowering plants

Oreofraga morrisiana is a species of flowering plant in the family Apiaceae, and the only species in the genus Oreofraga. It is found only on Socotra, Yemen. Its natural habitat is rocky areas.
