= Cortiella =

Scientific classification
- Kingdom: Plantae
- Clade: Tracheophytes
- Clade: Angiosperms
- Clade: Eudicots
- Clade: Asterids
- Order: Apiales
- Family: Apiaceae
- Subfamily: Apioideae
- Tribe: Selineae
- Genus: Cortiella; C.Norman

Genus of flowering plants

Cortiella is a genus of flowering plants belonging to the family Apiaceae.

Its native range is Tibet, Himalaya.

Species:

- Cortiella caespitosa R.H.Shan & M.L.Sheh
- Cortiella cortioides (C.Norman) M.F.Watson
- Cortiella hookeri (C.B.Clarke) C.Norman
- Cortiella lamondiana Fullarton & M.F.Watson
