= Billburttia =

Scientific classification
- Kingdom: Plantae
- Clade: Tracheophytes
- Clade: Angiosperms
- Clade: Eudicots
- Clade: Asterids
- Order: Apiales
- Family: Apiaceae
- Subfamily: Apioideae
- Tribe: Apieae
- Genus: Billburttia; Magee & B.-E.van Wyk

Genus of flowering plants

Billburttia is a genus of flowering plants belonging to the family Apiaceae.

Its native range is Madagascar.

Species:

- Billburttia capensoides Sales & Hedge
- Billburttia vaginoides Sales & Hedge
